= 2022–23 Texas Southern Tigers basketball team =

American college basketball season

2022–23 Texas Southern Tigers basketball
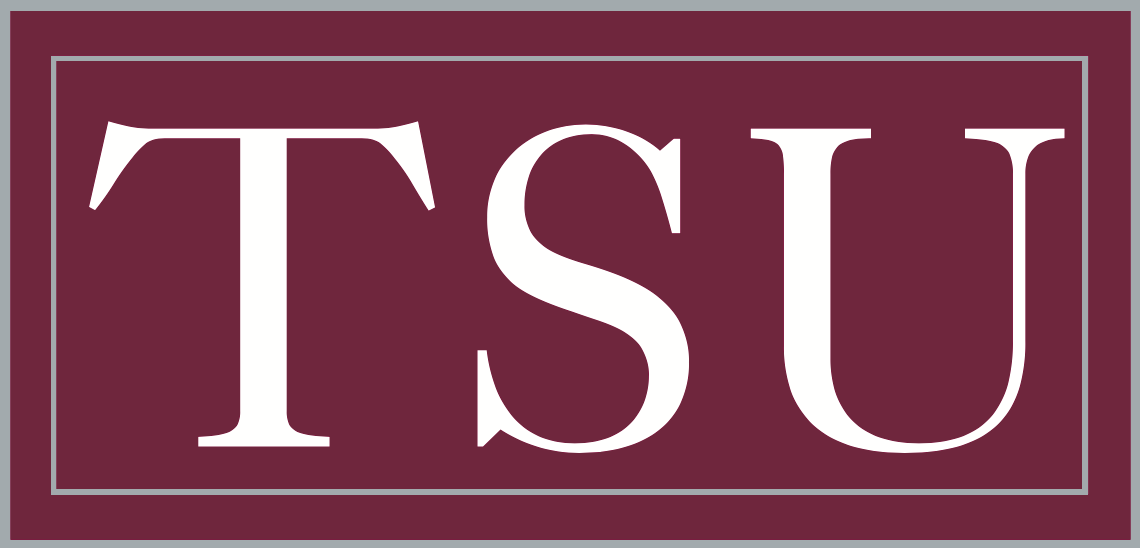

SWAC tournament champions

NCAA tournament, First Four
- Conference: Southwestern Athletic Conference
- Record: 14–21 (7–11 SWAC)
- Head coach: Johnny Jones (5th season)
- Assistant coaches: Shyrone Chatman; Josh White; Brandon Chambers
- Home arena: Health and Physical Education Arena

2022–23 SWAC men's basketball standings
	Conf.				Overall
Team	W		L	PCT	W		L	PCT
Alcorn State	15	–	3	.833	18	–	14	.563
Grambling State	15	–	3	.833	24	–	9	.727
Jackson State	12	–	6	.667	14	–	19	.424
Southern	11	–	7	.611	15	–	17	.469
Alabama A&M	10	–	8	.556	15	–	18	.455
Prairie View A&M	9	–	9	.500	13	–	19	.406
Bethune–Cookman	8	–	10	.444	12	–	20	.375
Texas Southern †	7	–	11	.389	14	–	21	.400
Alabama State	6	–	12	.333	8	–	23	.258
Arkansas–Pine Bluff	6	–	12	.333	10	–	21	.323
Florida A&M	5	–	13	.278	7	–	22	.241
Mississippi Valley State	4	–	14	.222	5	–	27	.156
† 2023 SWAC tournament winner

The 2022–23 Texas Southern Tigers basketball team represented Texas Southern University in the 2022–23 NCAA Division I men's basketball season. The Tigers, led by fifth-year head coach Johnny Jones, played their home games at the Health and Physical Education Arena in Houston, Texas as members of the Southwestern Athletic Conference (SWAC).

They finished the season 14–20, 7–11, in SWAC play, to finish in eighth place. They defeated top-seeded Alcorn State, fifth-seeded Alabama A&M and second-seeded Grambling State to become champions of the SWAC tournament for a third straight year. They received the SWAC's automatic bid to the NCAA tournament where they lost to Fairleigh Dickinson in the First Four.

With a record of 14–20, Texas Southern entered the NCAA tournament with one of the worst regular-season records ever, with a winning percentage of 41.18%. They also had the most losses by an automatic bid in the history of the tournament.

== Previous season ==
The Tigers finished the 2021–22 season 19–13, 13–5 in SWAC play, to finish in second place. As the No. 2 seed, they defeated No. 7 seed Jackson State, Grambling State and top-seeded Alcorn State to win the SWAC tournament and receive the conference's automatic bid into the NCAA tournament. They were given the No. 16 seed in the Midwest Region, where they defeated Texas A&M–Corpus Christi in the First Four, before falling to top-seeded and eventual national champion Kansas in the first round.

== Roster ==
2022–23 Texas Southern Tigers men's basketball team
Players
Coaches

Pos.	#	Name	Height	Weight	Year	Previous school	Hometown
G	0	Isaiah Marin	6 ft 5 in (1.96 m)	190 lb (86 kg)	Jr	Indian Hills Community College	Phoenix, AZ
F	2	Davon Barnes	6 ft 5 in (1.96 m)	215 lb (98 kg)	So	Collierville High School	Memphis, TN
G	3	PJ Henry	5 ft 10 in (1.78 m)	175 lb (79 kg)	Sr	Hartford	Houston, TX
G/F	4	Chris Craig	6 ft 3 in (1.91 m)	178 lb (81 kg)	Jr	Texas–Tyler	Denton, TX
F	5	Joirdon Nicholas	6 ft 9 in (2.06 m)	220 lb (100 kg)	GS	Stephen F. Austin	Houston, TX
G	11	Jordan Gilliam	6 ft 6 in (1.98 m)	175 lb (79 kg)	GS	UC Riverside	Houston, TX
G/F	12	Zytarious Mortle	6 ft 2 in (1.88 m)	199 lb (90 kg)	Fr	Sunrise Christian	Alexandria, LA
G	14	Kolby Granger	6 ft 5 in (1.96 m)	180 lb (82 kg)	RS Fr	Ridge Point High School	Missouri City, TX
G	20	Kehlin Farooq	6 ft 5 in (1.96 m)	180 lb (82 kg)	RS So	Hampton	Houston, TX
F	23	Shaqir O'Neal	6 ft 7 in (2.01 m)	185 lb (84 kg)	RS So	Union Grove High School	Los Angeles, CA
F	24	John III Walker	6 ft 9 in (2.06 m)	200 lb (91 kg)	GS	Texas A&M	Houston, TX
F	25	Grayson Carter	6 ft 10 in (2.08 m)	225 lb (102 kg)	RS Sr	UT Arlington	Dallas, TX

Head coach

- Johnny Jones (LSU)

Assistant coach(es)

- Shyrone Chatman (Memphis)
- Josh White (North Texas)
- Brandon Chambers (VCU)

Legend

- (C) Team captain
- (S) Suspended
- (I) Ineligible
- (W) Walk-on
- Injured
- Current redshirt

Roster
Last update: January 29, 2023

== Schedule and results ==
Date time, TV	Rank^{#}	Opponent^{#}	Result	Record	High points	High rebounds	High assists	Site (attendance) city, state
Non-conference regular season
November 7, 2022*; 9:00 p.m., WCC		at San Francisco	L 77–90	0–1	21 – Henry	4 – Gilliam	2 – Barnes	War Memorial Gymnasium (1,730); San Francisco, CA
November 10, 2022*; 7:00 p.m., ESPN+		at No. 25 Texas Tech	L 54–78	0–2	12 – Mortle	12 – Walker III	2 – tied	United Supermarkets Arena (13,835); Lubbock, TX
November 13, 2022*; 2:00 p.m., ESPN+		Arizona State; Pac-12/SWAC Legacy Series	W 67–66 ^{OT}	1–2	22 – Henry	9 – Nicholas	4 – Henry	H&PE Arena (3,184); Houston, TX
November 15, 2022*; 7:00 p.m., YouTube		Oral Roberts; Cougar Classic	L 64–82	1–3	19 – Barnes	10 – Carter	5 – Henry	H&PE Arena (2,109); Houston, TX
November 16, 2022*; 7:00 p.m., ESPN+		at No. 3 Houston; Cougar Classic	L 48–83	1–4	15 – Mortle	7 – Barnes	1 – tied	Fertitta Center (7,322); Houston, TX
November 18, 2022*; 7:00 p.m., ESPN+		at No. 13 Auburn	L 56–72	1–5	13 – Nicholas	13 – Nicholas	2 – tied	Neville Arena (9,121); Auburn, AL
November 20, 2022*; 2:00 p.m., ESPN+		at Samford	L 63–78	1–6	30 – Barnes	7 – Nicholas	3 – Barnes	Pete Hanna Center (2,333); Homewood, AL
November 28, 2022*; 7:30 p.m., ESPN+		at No. 9 Kansas	L 55–87	1–7	22 – Barnes	6 – Mortle	3 – Nicholas	Allen Fieldhouse (16,300); Lawrence, KS
December 11, 2022*; 3:00 p.m., YouTube		North American	W 95–47	2–7	20 – Farooq	12 – Nicholas	6 – Marin	H&PE Arena (210); Houston, TX
December 17, 2022*; 8:30 p.m., ESPN+		vs. North Carolina A&T; HBCU Challenge	L 66–67 ^{OT}	2–8	21 – Nicholas	18 – Nicholas	5 – Henry	MGM Grand Garden Arena; Las Vegas, NV
December 18, 2022*; 3:30 p.m., ESPNU		vs. Hampton; Chris Paul's HBCU Challenge	W 82–77	3–8	19 – Farooq	8 – Farooq	4 – Granger	MGM Grand Garden Arena (2,029); Las Vegas, NV
December 22, 2022*; 7:00 p.m., ESPN+		at Wichita State	L 56–65	3–9	16 – Barnes	12 – Nicholas	4 – Barnes	Charles Koch Arena (6,468); Wichita, KS
December 29, 2022*; 7:00 p.m., YouTube		Huston–Tillotson	W 92–54	4–9	28 – Nicholas	15 – Nicholas	3 – tied	H&PE Arena (170); Houston, TX
SWAC regular season
January 2, 2023; 7:30 p.m., YouTube		Southern	L 76–77 ^{OT}	4–10 (0–1)	34 – Mortle	9 – Nicholas	3 – tied	H&PE Arena (2,741); Houston, TX
January 4, 2023; 7:30 p.m., YouTube		Grambling State	L 72–85	4–11 (0–2)	20 – Mortle	6 – Marin	4 – Marin	H&PE Arena (2,219); Houston, TX
January 7, 2023; 3:30 p.m., HBCU Go		at Arkansas–Pine Bluff	L 66–70	4–12 (0–3)	22 – Barnes	12 – Farooq	3 – tied	H. O. Clemmons Arena (1,341); Pine Bluff, AR
January 9, 2023; 7:30 p.m.		at Mississippi Valley State	L 67–71	4–13 (0–4)	18 – Barnes	6 – tied	3 – Farooq	Harrison HPER Complex (1,908); Itta Bena, MS
January 14, 2023; 5:00 p.m., YouTube		Alcorn State	L 74–79 ^{OT}	4–14 (0–5)	20 – Barnes	9 – Craig	4 – Barnes	H&PE Arena (1,840); Houston, TX
January 16, 2023; 7:30 p.m., HBCU Go		Jackson State	W 84–82	5–14 (1–5)	28 – Walker III	5 – Mortle	8 – Barnes	H&PE Arena (3,152); Houston, TX
January 21, 2023; 7:00 p.m.		at Alabama A&M	W 70–59	6–14 (2–5)	17 – Barnes	12 – Nicholas	3 – Mortle	Alabama A&M Events Center (1,954); Huntsville, AL
January 23, 2023; 7:30 p.m.		at Alabama State	W 71–65	7–14 (3–5)	21 – Farooq	9 – Farooq	2 – Walker III	Dunn–Oliver Acadome (1,022); Montgomery, AL
January 28, 2023; 8:00 p.m., YouTube		Prairie View A&M	L 74–89 ^{2OT}	7–15 (3–6)	19 – Barnes	9 – Walker III	3 – Henry	H&PE Arena (7,371); Houston, TX
February 4, 2023; 5:00 p.m., YouTube		Florida A&M	L 69–76	7–16 (3–7)	26 – Walker III	11 – Nicholas	3 – tied	H&PE Arena (3,892); Houston, TX
February 6, 2023; 7:30 p.m., ESPNU		Bethune–Cookman	W 69–62	8–16 (4–7)	21 – Walker III	10 – Nicholas	6 – Henry	H&PE Arena (2,912); Houston, TX
February 11, 2023; 5:30 p.m.		at Grambling State	L 46–65	8–17 (4–8)	10 – Henry	8 – Granger	2 – tied	Fredrick C. Hobdy Assembly Center (1,642); Grambling, LA
February 13, 2023; 7:30 p.m., HBCU Go		at Southern	W 79–68	9–17 (5–8)	29 – Granger	16 – Nicholas	5 – Henry	F. G. Clark Center (4,458); Baton Rouge, LA
February 18, 2023; 5:00 p.m., YouTube		Mississippi Valley State	W 80–62	10–17 (6–8)	19 – Henry	8 – Nicholas	6 – Farooq	H&PE Arena (1,133); Houston, TX
February 20, 2023; 7:30 p.m., YouTube		Arkansas–Pine Bluff	W 64–59	11–17 (7–8)	19 – Walker III	9 – Granger	3 – Henry	H&PE Arena (2,031); Houston, TX
February 25, 2023; 5:00 p.m., HBCU Go		at Jackson State	L 69–71	11–18 (7–9)	16 – Nicholas	14 – Nicholas	3 – Walker III	Williams Assembly Center (2,121); Jackson, MS
February 27, 2023; 7:30 p.m.		at Alcorn State	L 81–89	11–19 (7–10)	41 – Henry	9 – Walker III	4 – Barnes	Davey Whitney Complex (956); Lorman, MS
March 4, 2023; 3:00 p.m., HBCU Go		at Prairie View A&M	L 74–78	11–20 (7–11)	19 – Henry	12 – Nicholas	3 – tied	William Nicks Building (3,282); Prairie View, TX
SWAC tournament
March 8, 2023; 8:30 p.m., ESPN+	(8)	vs. (1) Alcorn State; Quarterfinals	W 66–62	12–20	19 – Barnes	10 – Nicholas	3 – tied	Bartow Arena (807); Birmingham, AL
March 10, 2023; 2:00 p.m., ESPN+	(8)	vs. (5) Alabama A&M; Semifinals	W 74–61	13–20	26 – Henry	10 – Barnes	4 – Granger	Bartow Arena (645); Birmingham, AL
March 11, 2023; 4:30 p.m., ESPNU	(8)	vs. (2) Grambling State; Championship	W 61–58	14–20	19 – Henry	8 – Barnes	4 – Walker III	Bartow Arena (1,478); Birmingham, AL
NCAA tournament
March 15, 2023*; 5:40 p.m., TruTV	(16 E)	vs. (16 E) Fairleigh Dickinson; First Four	L 61–84	14–21	22 – Walker III	8 – Nicholas	3 – tied	UD Arena (12,431); Dayton, OH
*Non-conference game. ^{#}Rankings from AP poll. (#) Tournament seedings in parentheses. E=East. All times are in Central.
