= 2022–23 Air Force Falcons men's basketball team =

American college basketball season

2022–23 Air Force Falcons men's basketball
- Conference: Mountain West Conference
- Record: 14–18 (5–13 MW)
- Head coach: Joe Scott (7th overall, 3rd straight season)
- Assistant coaches: David Metzendorf; Jared Czech; Lt. Col. Matt McCraw; Maj. Marc Holum
- Home arena: Clune Arena

2022–23 Mountain West Conference men's basketball standings
	Conf.				Overall
Team	W		L	PCT	W		L	PCT
No. 18 San Diego State †	15	–	3	.833	32	–	7	.821
Boise State	13	–	5	.722	24	–	10	.706
Utah State	13	–	5	.722	26	–	9	.743
Nevada	12	–	6	.667	22	–	11	.667
San Jose State	10	–	8	.556	21	–	14	.600
New Mexico	8	–	10	.444	22	–	12	.647
UNLV	7	–	11	.389	19	–	13	.594
Colorado State	6	–	12	.333	15	–	18	.455
Fresno State	6	–	12	.333	11	–	20	.355
Air Force	5	–	13	.278	14	–	18	.438
Wyoming	4	–	14	.222	9	–	22	.290
† Conference tournament winner Rankings from AP poll

The 2022–23 Air Force Falcons men's basketball team represented the United States Air Force Academy during the 2022–23 NCAA Division I men's basketball season. The Falcons were led by head coach Joe Scott in his 3rd season (7th overall) with the program and played their home games at Clune Arena in Colorado Springs, Colorado. They participated as members of the Mountain West Conference for the 24th season.

The Falcons finished the season 14–18, 5–13 in Mountain West play, finishing in tenth place. They lost to UNLV in the first round of the Mountain West conference tournament.

== Previous season ==
The Falcons finished the 2021–22 season 11–18, 4–13 in Mountain West play, to finish in tenth place.

The Falcons faced 7-seed Utah State in the first round of the Mountain West tournament, where they were defeated 56–83 to end their season.

== Offseason ==
=== Departures ===
Name	Number	Pos.	Height	Weight	Year	Hometown	Reason for departure
Joseph Octave	0	G	6' 4"	200	Sophomore	Gardena, CA	Elected to transfer to Holy Cross
A.J. Moore	10	G	6' 2"	191	Senior	San Antonio, TX	Graduated
Christian Depollar	12	G	6' 5"	202	Junior	Montgomery County, MD	No longer on team roster
Abe Kinrade	15	F	6' 7"	200	Senior	Maquoketa, IA	Graduated
CJ Haut	31	F	6' 8"	200	Junior	Monroe, WI	No longer on team roster
Simon Banks	32	F	6' 1"	185	Junior	Indianapolis, IN	No longer on team roster
Derek Dickenscheidt	33	G/F	6' 6"	190	Sophomore	Katy, TX	No longer on team roster
Kyle Brown	34	G	6' 2"	185	Sophomore	La Cañada, CA	No longer on team roster

== Roster ==
2022–23 Air Force Falcons men's basketball team
Players
Coaches

Pos.	#	Name	Height	Weight	Year	Previous school	Hometown
G	3	Jake Heidbreder	6 ft 5 in (1.96 m)	180 lb (82 kg)	So	Floyd Central HS	Floyds Knob, IN
G	4	Carter Murphy	6 ft 4 in (1.93 m)	190 lb (86 kg)	Sr	Arcadia HS	Phoenix, AZ
G	5	Ethan Taylor	6 ft 5 in (1.96 m)	190 lb (86 kg)	So	Memorial HS	Houston, TX
G	11	Byron Brown	6 ft 4 in (1.93 m)	205 lb (93 kg)	So	Sahuarita HS	Sahuarita, AZ
F	13	Chase Beasley	6 ft 7 in (2.01 m)	185 lb (84 kg)	So	St. Stephens & St. Agnes	Fort Washington, MD
F	24	Kaleb Lichau	6 ft 7 in (2.01 m)	205 lb (93 kg)	So	Peninsula HS	Gig Harbor, WA
F	22	Nikc Jackson	6 ft 8 in (2.03 m)	195 lb (88 kg)	Sr	Rancho Solano HS	Scottsdale, AZ
G	23	Jake Murphy	6 ft 4 in (1.93 m)	200 lb (91 kg)	So	Phoenix Prep	Phoenix, AZ
G	24	Jeffrey Mills	6 ft 4 in (1.93 m)	195 lb (88 kg)	So	Flower Mound HS	Flower Mound, TX
G	30	Camden Vander Zwaag	6 ft 4 in (1.93 m)	200 lb (91 kg)	Sr	Johnston HS	Johnston, IA
C	35	Lucas Moerman	6 ft 10 in (2.08 m)	205 lb (93 kg)	So	Doherty GS	Colorado Springs, CO

Head coach

- Joe Scott (Princeton)

Assistant coach(es)

- David Metzendorf (Ithaca)
- Jared Czech (Manhattanville)
- Lt. Col. Matt McCraw (Air Force)
- Maj. Marc Holum (Air Force)
- Zack Curran (Virginia Tech)
- Jon Jordan

Legend

- (C) Team captain
- (S) Suspended
- (I) Ineligible
- (W) Walk-on
- Injured
- Current redshirt

Roster
Last update: March 9, 2025

== Schedule and results ==
Date time, TV	Rank^{#}	Opponent^{#}	Result	Record	High points	High rebounds	High assists	Site (attendance) city, state
Non-conference regular season
November 7, 2022; 5:00 p.m., ESPN3		at Bowling Green	L 58–62	0–1	14 – Vander Zwaag	8 – Moerman	4 – Taylor	Stroh Center (1,389); Bowling Green, OH
November 11, 2022; 3:00 p.m., MW Network		Delaware	W 75–71	1–1	26 – Heidbreder	7 – Heidbreder	5 – Vander Zwaag	Clune Arena (1,625); Colorado Springs, CO
November 14, 2022; 7:00 p.m., MW Network		Texas A&M–Commerce	L 69–73 ^{OT}	1–2	16 – Heidbreder	10 – Petraitis	4 – Mills	Clune Arena (1,131); Colorado Springs, CO
November 17, 2022; 7:00 p.m., MW Network		Portland	L 51–64	1–3	14 – Taylor	10 – Jackson	3 – Taylor	Clune Arena (1,276); Colorado Springs, CO
November 21, 2022; 7:00 p.m., Altitude2		South Carolina Upstate; Collegiate Hoops Roadshow	W 83–56	2–3	20 – Vander Zwaag	12 – Green	6 – Green	Clune Arena (1,022); Colorado Springs, CO
November 23, 2022; 4:00 p.m., MW Network		Mississippi Valley State; Collegiate Hoops Roadshow	W 64–51	3–3	22 – Vander Zwaag	5 – Green	6 – Taylor	Clune Arena (1,490); Colorado Springs, CO
November 27, 2022; 1:00 p.m., Altitude		Montana	W 59–56	4–3	16 – Heidbreder	6 – Taylor	4 – 2 tied	Clune Arena (1,196); Colorado Springs, CO
November 30, 2022; 7:00 p.m., Altitude		Arkansas–Pine Bluff	W 81–53	5–3	16 – Taylor	7 – 2 tied	9 – Mills	Clune Arena (1,176); Colorado Springs, CO
December 3, 2022; 2:00 p.m., ESPN+		at Portland State	L 64–68	5–4	22 – Petraitis	8 – Petraitas	4 – 2 tied	Viking Pavilion (1,055); Portland, OR
December 6, 2022; 3:00 p.m., MW Network		South Dakota	W 79–58	6–4	27 – Heidbreder	8 – Petraitas	6 – Taylor	Clune Arena (855); Colorado Springs, CO
December 9, 2022; 7:00 p.m., MW Network		Arkansas State	W 80–55	7–4	16 – Heidbreder	5 – Taylor	7 – Taylor	Clune Arena (1,119); Colorado Springs, CO
December 18, 2022; 1:30 p.m., Altitude		Tarleton State	W 81–67	8–4	20 – Petraitis	10 – Petraitis	4 – Taylor	Clune Arena (1,038); Colorado Springs, CO
December 20, 2022; 6:00 p.m., ESPN+		at Northern Colorado	W 67–65	9–4	17 – Heidbreder	7 – 2 tied	3 – Mills	Bank of Colorado Arena (1,601); Greeley, CO
Mountain West regular season
December 28, 2022; 9:00 p.m., FS1		at San Diego State	L 55–71	9–5 (0–1)	10 – Mills	4 – 2 tied	5 – Petraitis	Viejas Arena (12,414); San Diego, CA
December 31, 2022; 12:00 p.m., Altitude2		Nevada	L 69–75	9–6 (0–2)	22 – Heidbreder	5 – Becker	3 – Tied	Clune Arena (1,704); Colorado Springs, CO
January 3, 2023; 7:00 p.m., CBSSN		Utah State	L 65–77	9–7 (0–3)	19 – Heidbreder	4 – Tied	5 – Tied	Clune Arena (1,461); Colorado Springs, CO
January 10, 2023; 7:00 p.m., Evoca		at Colorado State	W 85–74 ^{OT}	10–7 (1–3)	26 – McCreary	13 – Petraitis	4 – 2 tied	Moby Arena (4,003); Fort Collins, CO
January 14, 2023; 5:00 p.m., MW Network		at Fresno State	W 51–48	11–7 (2–3)	15 – Taylor	8 – Petraitis	5 – Taylor	Save Mart Center (5,864); Fresno, CA
January 17, 2023; 7:00 p.m., Altitude2		Wyoming	W 82–74	12–7 (3–3)	23 – Becker	9 – Petraitis	5 – Petraitis	Clune Arena (1,257); Colorado Springs, CO
January 21, 2023; 8:00 p.m., CBSSN		San Diego State	L 60–70	12–8 (3–4)	17 – Heidbreder	6 – Heidbreder	5 – Petraitis	Clune Arena (1,489); Colorado Springs, CO
January 24, 2023; 8:00 p.m.		at San Jose State	L 52–82	12–9 (3–5)	11 – Vander Zwaag	4 – Becker	3 – Petraitis	Provident Credit Union Event Center (3,371); San Jose, CA
January 27, 2023; 8:30 p.m., CBSSN		at No. 25 New Mexico	L 73–81	12–10 (3–6)	19 – Petraitis	11 – Petraitis	5 – Taylor	The Pit (15,143); Albuquerque, NM
January 31, 2023; 7:00 p.m., Altitude		Boise State	L 52–59	12–11 (3–7)	20 – Petraitis	10 – Becker	5 – Mills	Clune Arena (843); Colorado Springs, CO
February 3, 2023; 9:00 p.m., CBSSN		at Nevada	L 52–72	12–12 (3–8)	18 – Heidbreder	6 – Becker	3 – 2 tied	Lawlor Events Center (10,186); Reno, NV
February 7, 2023; 7:00 p.m., Altitude2		Colorado State	L 53–69	12–13 (3–9)	13 – 2 tied	5 – Petraitis	5 – Petraitis	Clune Arena (1,068); Colorado Springs, CO
February 10, 2023; 7:00 p.m., FS1		New Mexico	W 89–77	13–13 (4–9)	26 – Heidbreder	7 – Mills	4 – Petraitis	Clune Arena (1,899); Colorado Springs, CO
February 14, 2023; 7:00 p.m., MW Network		at Utah State	L 65–80	13–14 (4–10)	16 – Heidbreder	9 – Petraitis	5 – Taylor	Smith Spectrum (6,935); Logan, UT
February 17, 2023; 8:00 p.m., FS1		at Wyoming	W 75–69	14–14 (5–10)	22 – Heidbreder	10 – Petraitis	4 – Petraitis	Arena-Auditorium (4,719); Laramie, WY
February 21, 2023; 7:00 p.m., Altitude		Fresno State	L 69–74	14–15 (5–11)	17 – Heidbreder	5 – Heidbreder	7 – Heidbreder	Clune Arena (847); Colorado Springs, CO
February 24, 2023; 7:30 p.m., CBSSN		at UNLV	L 53–54	14–16 (5–12)	16 – 2 tied	10 – Petraitis	6 – Becker	Thomas & Mack Center (5,831); Paradise, NV
March 4, 2023; 2:00 p.m., Altitude		San Jose State	L 61–63	14–17 (5–13)	17 – Murphy	10 – Petraitis	3 – 3 tied	Clune Arena (1,611); Colorado Springs, CO
Mountain West tournament
March 8, 2023; 1:30 p.m., Stadium	(10)	vs. (7) UNLV; First round	L 70–78 ^{OT}	14–18	24 – Heidbreder	10 – Petraitis	5 – Murphy	Thomas & Mack Center (–); Paradise, NV
*Non-conference game. ^{#}Rankings from AP poll. (#) Tournament seedings in parentheses. All times are in Mountain.
