= 2022–23 Arkansas–Pine Bluff Golden Lions men's basketball team =

American college basketball season

2022–23 Arkansas–Pine Bluff Golden Lions men's basketball
- Conference: Southwestern Athletic Conference
- Record: 10–21 (6–12 SWAC)
- Head coach: Solomon Bozeman (2nd season)
- Assistant coaches: Cameron Henderson; Bryan Sherrer
- Home arena: H.O. Clemmons Arena

2022–23 SWAC men's basketball standings
	Conf.				Overall
Team	W		L	PCT	W		L	PCT
Alcorn State	15	–	3	.833	18	–	14	.563
Grambling State	15	–	3	.833	24	–	9	.727
Jackson State	12	–	6	.667	14	–	19	.424
Southern	11	–	7	.611	15	–	17	.469
Alabama A&M	10	–	8	.556	15	–	18	.455
Prairie View A&M	9	–	9	.500	13	–	19	.406
Bethune–Cookman	8	–	10	.444	12	–	20	.375
Texas Southern †	7	–	11	.389	14	–	21	.400
Alabama State	6	–	12	.333	8	–	23	.258
Arkansas–Pine Bluff	6	–	12	.333	10	–	21	.323
Florida A&M	5	–	13	.278	7	–	22	.241
Mississippi Valley State	4	–	14	.222	5	–	27	.156
† 2023 SWAC tournament winner

The 2022–23 Arkansas–Pine Bluff Golden Lions men's basketball team represented the University of Arkansas at Pine Bluff in the 2022–23 NCAA Division I men's basketball season. The Golden Lions, led by second-year head coach Solomon Bozeman, played their home games at the H.O. Clemmons Arena in Pine Bluff, Arkansas as members of the Southwestern Athletic Conference.

== Previous season ==
The Golden Lions finished the 2021–22 season 7–24, 5–13 in SWAC play to finish in second-to-last place. In turn, they failed to qualify for the SWAC tournament.

== Roster ==
2022–23 Arkansas–Pine Bluff Golden Lions men's basketball team
Players
Coaches

Pos.	#	Name	Height	Weight	Year	Hometown
G	0	Trejon Ware	5 ft 9 in (1.75 m)	160 lb (73 kg)	So	Pearland, Texas
G	1	Kylen Milton	6 ft 4 in (1.93 m)	192 lb (87 kg)	So	Conway, Arkansas
G	2	Zach Reinhart	6 ft 6 in (1.98 m)	195 lb (88 kg)	Fr	Orlando, Florida
G	3	Kuron Coleman	6 ft 4 in (1.93 m)	180 lb (82 kg)	Fr	Newport News, Virginia
G	4	Orion Virden	6 ft 1 in (1.85 m)	195 lb (88 kg)	Jr	Pine Bluff, Arkansas
F	5	Rafael Martinez	6 ft 8 in (2.03 m)	215 lb (98 kg)	Fr	Geneva, Switzerland
G	11	Rashad Williams	6 ft 2 in (1.88 m)	185 lb (84 kg)	Sr	Detroit, Michigan
G/F	12	Samuel Da Cruz	6 ft 9 in (2.06 m)	205 lb (93 kg)	Fr	Minas, Brazil
F	13	Chris Greene	6 ft 8 in (2.03 m)	225 lb (102 kg)	GS	Newport News, Virginia
G	14	Brahm Harris	6 ft 6 in (1.98 m)	215 lb (98 kg)	Sr	Maumelle, Arkansas
G	21	Shaun Doss Jr.	6 ft 5 in (1.96 m)	185 lb (84 kg)	GS	Marion, Arkansas
F	22	Robert Lewis	6 ft 9 in (2.06 m)	210 lb (95 kg)	Fr	St. Louis, Missouri
G/F	24	AC Curry	6 ft 5 in (1.96 m)	190 lb (86 kg)	Jr	Denver, Colorado
F	32	Caleb Stokes	6 ft 8 in (2.03 m)	275 lb (125 kg)	Jr	Little Rock, Arkansas
F	45	Ismael Plet	6 ft 8 in (2.03 m)	230 lb (104 kg)	So	Amsterdam, Netherlands

Head coach

- Solomon Bozeman (Little Rock)

Assistant coach(es)

- Cameron Henderson (Montana State)
- Bryan Sherrer (South Alabama)

Legend

- (C) Team captain
- (S) Suspended
- (I) Ineligible
- (W) Walk-on
- Injured
- Current redshirt

Roster
Last update: December 29, 2022

== Schedule and results ==
Date time, TV	Rank^{#}	Opponent^{#}	Result	Record	High points	High rebounds	High assists	Site (attendance) city, state
Non-conference regular season
November 7, 2022*; 7:00 pm, Big 12 Now		at No. 14 TCU	L 72–73	0–1	25 – Doss Jr.	8 – Plet	10 – Milton	Schollmaier Arena (5,483); Fort Worth, TX
November 9, 2022*; 7:00 pm		Champion Christian	W 87–55	1–1	18 – Doss Jr.	12 – Plet	6 – Milton	H.O. Clemmons Arena (1,734); Pine Bluff, AR
November 11, 2022*; 7:00 pm, ESPN+		at Oklahoma	L 58–66	1–2	17 – Doss Jr.	10 – Plet	3 – Greene	Lloyd Noble Center (4,908); Norman, OK
November 13, 2022*; 2:00 pm, SECN		at Mississippi State	L 47–80	1–3	15 – Doss Jr.	6 – 2 Tied	2 – 3 Tied	Humphrey Coliseum (5,664); Starkville, MS
November 16, 2022*; 11:00 am		at Kent State	L 68–94	1–4	29 – Doss Jr.	4 – 3 Tied	3 – 2 Tied	MAC Center (381); Kent, OH
November 18, 2022*; 6:00 pm, ESPN+		at Cleveland State	L 58–67	1–5	16 – Doss Jr.	12 – Plet	3 – 2 Tied	Wolstein Center (2,073); Cleveland, OH
November 20, 2022*; 2:30 pm, BTN		at Nebraska	L 58–82	1–6	17 – Reinhart	4 – Plet	5 – Milton	Pinnacle Bank Arena (13,262); Lincoln, NE
November 22, 2022*; 7:00 pm		Crowley's Ridge	W 70–56	2–6	22 – Greene	7 – 2 Tied	8 – Milton	H.O. Clemmons Arena (1,248); Pine Bluff, AR
November 30, 2022*; 8:00 pm, Altitude 2		at Air Force	L 53–81	2–7	21 – Doss Jr.	6 – Curry	2 – Milton	Clune Arena (1,176); Colorado Springs, CO
December 3, 2022*; 2:00 pm		Arkansas Baptist	W 59–41	3–7	25 – Greene	12 – Doss Jr.	3 – Doss Jr.	H.O. Clemmons Arena (1,736); Pine Bluff, AR
December 10, 2022*; 12:00 pm, LHN		at No. 2 Texas; Jimmy Blacklock Classic	L 43–88	3–8	14 – Greene	8 – Harris	2 – 2 Tied	Moody Center (10,673); Austin, TX
December 14, 2022*; 7:00 pm, BTN		at Minnesota	L 56–72	3–9	19 – Milton	9 – Curry	9 – Milton	Williams Arena (8,127); Minneapolis, MN
December 17, 2022*; 1:00 pm		Ecclesia	W 104–50	4–9	24 – Doss Jr.	10 – 4 Tied	10 – Milton	H.O. Clemmons Arena (1,142); Pine Bluff, AR
SWAC regular season
January 2, 2023; 7:00 pm, YouTube		at Alabama A&M	L 59–66	4–10 (0–1)	12 – Harris	8 – 2 Tied	6 – Milton	Alabama A&M Events Center (817); Huntsville, AL
January 4, 2023; 7:30 pm		at Alabama State	L 66–80	4–11 (0–2)	19 – Milton	7 – 3 Tied	4 – Doss Jr.	Dunn–Oliver Acadome (417); Montgomery, AL
January 7, 2023; 3:00 pm, HBCU Go		Texas Southern	W 70–66	5–11 (1–2)	22 – Doss Jr.	10 – Doss Jr.	4 – 2 Tied	H.O. Clemmons Arena (1,341); Pine Bluff, AR
January 9, 2023; 5:30 pm, UAPB Sports Network		Prairie View A&M	W 63–55	6–11 (2–2)	22 – Milton	8 – Plet	5 – Milton	H.O. Clemmons Arena (1,532); Pine Bluff, AR
January 14, 2023; 4:00 pm, Facebook Live		at Florida A&M	W 67–54	7–11 (3–2)	20 – Milton	8 – Doss Jr.	6 – Ware	Al Lawson Center (1,587); Tallahassee, FL
January 16, 2023; 6:30 pm, Cateye Network		at Bethune–Cookman	W 77–71	8–11 (4–2)	20 – Harris	12 – Plet	5 – Doss Jr.	Moore Gymnasium (613); Daytona Beach, FL
January 21, 2023; 5:30 pm, UAPB Sports Network		Southern	W 62–55	9–11 (5–2)	23 – Doss Jr.	11 – Curry	5 – Milton	H.O. Clemmons Arena (1,351); Pine Bluff, AR
January 23, 2023; 7:30 pm, UAPB Sports Network		Grambling State	L 70–77	9–12 (5–3)	30 – Doss Jr.	6 – Doss Jr.	6 – Ware	H.O. Clemmons Arena (1,724); Pine Bluff, AR
January 28, 2023; 5:30 pm, UAPB Sports Network		Mississippi Valley State	W 88–72	10–12 (6–3)	23 – Milton	7 – Ware	6 – 2 Tied	H.O. Clemmons Arena (2,395); Pine Bluff, AR
February 4, 2023; 4:00 pm		at Alcorn State	L 67–70	10–13 (6–4)	18 – Curry	6 – Ware	5 – Milton	Davey Whitney Complex; Lorman, MS
February 6, 2023; 7:30 pm		at Jackson State	L 84–88 ^{2OT}	10–14 (6–5)	32 – Doss Jr.	7 – 2 Tied	2 – 2 Tied	Williams Assembly Center (1,134); Jackson, MS
February 11, 2023; 3:00 pm, HBCU Go		Alabama State	L 71–74	10–15 (6–6)	17 – Milton	7 – Greene	5 – Tied	H.O. Clemmons Arena (2,631); Pine Bluff, AR
February 13, 2023; 5:30 pm, UAPB Sports Network		Alabama A&M	L 72–75	10–16 (6–7)	31 – Greene	9 – Harris	7 – Ware	H.O. Clemmons Arena (1,621); Pine Bluff, AR
February 18, 2023; 5:30 pm		at Prairie View A&M	L 71–82	10–17 (6–8)	15 – Doss Jr.	6 – Doss Jr.	4 – Doss Jr.	William Nicks Building (1,138); Prairie View, TX
February 20, 2023; 7:30 pm		at Texas Southern	L 59–64	10–18 (6–9)	23 – Greene	7 – Harris	4 – Milton	H&PE Arena (2,031); Houston, TX
February 25, 2023; 6:00 pm		at Mississippi Valley State	L 74–78	10–19 (6–10)	25 – Greene	9 – Doss Jr.	1 – Tied	Harrison HPER Complex (1,205); Itta Bena, MS
March 2, 2023; 8:00 pm, HBCU Go		Jackson State	L 63–67	10–20 (6–11)	21 – Milton	12 – Lewis	6 – Milton	H.O. Clemmons Arena (2,875); Pine Bluff, AR
March 4, 2023; 5:30 pm, UAPB Sports Network		Alcorn State	L 58–63	10–21 (6–12)	15 – Doss Jr.	12 – Lewis	7 – Ware	H.O. Clemmons Arena (1,754); Pine Bluff, AR
*Non-conference game. ^{#}Rankings from AP Poll. (#) Tournament seedings in parentheses. All times are in Central.
