= 2022–23 Jackson State Tigers basketball team =

American college basketball season

2022–23 Jackson State Tigers basketball
- Conference: Southwestern Athletic Conference
- Record: 14–19 (12–6 SWAC)
- Head coach: Mo Williams (1st season)
- Associate head coach: Trey Johnson
- Assistant coaches: Tyler Adams; Keith Williams
- Home arena: Williams Assembly Center

2022–23 SWAC men's basketball standings
	Conf.				Overall
Team	W		L	PCT	W		L	PCT
Alcorn State	15	–	3	.833	18	–	14	.563
Grambling State	15	–	3	.833	24	–	9	.727
Jackson State	12	–	6	.667	14	–	19	.424
Southern	11	–	7	.611	15	–	17	.469
Alabama A&M	10	–	8	.556	15	–	18	.455
Prairie View A&M	9	–	9	.500	13	–	19	.406
Bethune–Cookman	8	–	10	.444	12	–	20	.375
Texas Southern †	7	–	11	.389	14	–	21	.400
Alabama State	6	–	12	.333	8	–	23	.258
Arkansas–Pine Bluff	6	–	12	.333	10	–	21	.323
Florida A&M	5	–	13	.278	7	–	22	.241
Mississippi Valley State	4	–	14	.222	5	–	27	.156
† 2023 SWAC tournament winner

The 2022–23 Jackson State Tigers basketball team represented Jackson State University in the 2022–23 NCAA Division I men's basketball season. The Tigers, led by first-year head coach Mo Williams, played their home games at the Williams Assembly Center in Jackson, Mississippi, as members of the Southwestern Athletic Conference.

== Previous season ==
The Tigers finished the 2021–22 season 11–19, 9–9 in SWAC play to finish tied for sixth place. As the No. 7 seed, they were defeated by No. 2 seed Texas Southern in the quarterfinals of the SWAC tournament.

On March 4, head coach Wayne Brent announced that he'd retire following the 2021–22 season, ending his nine-year tenure with the team. On March 14, former NBA player and former Alabama State head coach Mo Williams was announced as the team's next head coach.

== Roster ==
2022–23 Jackson State Tigers men's basketball team
Players
Coaches

Pos.	#	Name	Height	Weight	Year	Hometown
G	0	Gabe Watson	6 ft 2 in (1.88 m)	190 lb (86 kg)	Sr	Ridgeland, Mississippi
F	1	Zeke Cook	6 ft 6 in (1.98 m)	220 lb (100 kg)	So	Starkville, Mississippi
G	2	Ken Evans Jr.	6 ft 5 in (1.96 m)	200 lb (91 kg)	RS So	Jackson, Mississippi
G/F	3	Trace Young	6 ft 8 in (2.03 m)	193 lb (88 kg)	RS Sr	Owensboro, Kentucky
G	4	Coltie Young	6 ft 3 in (1.91 m)	201 lb (91 kg)	So	Starkville, Mississippi
G	5	Keiveon Hunt	5 ft 11 in (1.8 m)	176 lb (80 kg)	Fr	Jackson, Mississippi
G	10	Chase Adams	5 ft 8 in (1.73 m)	144 lb (65 kg)	Jr	Chicago, Illinois
G	11	Keionte Cornelius	5 ft 10 in (1.78 m)	172 lb (78 kg)	So	Spring, Texas
F	13	Romelle Mansel	6 ft 9 in (2.06 m)	195 lb (88 kg)	Jr	Los Angeles, California
F	15	Avaughn Johnson	6 ft 5 in (1.96 m)	195 lb (88 kg)	Fr	Jackson, Mississippi
G	24	Jalani Bell	6 ft 0 in (1.83 m)	185 lb (84 kg)	So	Jackson, Mississippi
F	30	David McDaniel	6 ft 9 in (2.06 m)	210 lb (95 kg)	So	Alpharetta, Georgia
F	31	Jamarcus Jones	6 ft 5 in (1.96 m)	203 lb (92 kg)	Sr	Sardis, Mississippi
C	32	Treyon Johnson	6 ft 11 in (2.11 m)	285 lb (129 kg)	Jr	Chicago, Illinois
G/F	45	Jayme Mitchell	6 ft 5 in (1.96 m)	185 lb (84 kg)	So	Jackson, Mississippi

Head coach

- Mo Williams (Alabama)

Assistant coach(es)

- Trey Johnson (Jackson State)
- Tyler Adams (Georgetown)
- Keith Williams (Arkansas–Pine Bluff)

Legend

- (C) Team captain
- (S) Suspended
- (I) Ineligible
- (W) Walk-on
- Injured
- Current redshirt

Roster
Last update: November 10, 2022

== Schedule and results ==
Date time, TV	Rank^{#}	Opponent^{#}	Result	Record	Site (attendance) city, state
Exhibition
October 28, 2022*; 6:00 pm		Tuskegee	W 76–69	–	Williams Assembly Center; Jackson, MS
Non-conference regular season
November 7, 2022*; 7:00 pm, ESPN+		at Abilene Christian	L 56–65	0–1	Moody Coliseum (2,489); Abilene, TX
November 12, 2022*; 2:00 pm, ESPN+		at Tulsa	L 79–85	0–2	Reynolds Center (6,859); Tulsa, OK
November 20, 2022*; 6:30 pm, ESPN+		at Little Rock; Hoosier Tip-Off Classic	L 91–94	0–3	Jack Stephens Center (2,685); Little Rock, AR
November 23, 2022*; 7:30 pm, BTN		at Michigan	L 68–78	0–4	Crisler Center (10,244); Ann Arbor, MI
November 25, 2022*; 11:30 am, BTN		at No. 11 Indiana; Hoosier Tip-Off Classic	L 51–90	0–5	Simon Skjodt Assembly Hall (13,135); Bloomington, IN
November 29, 2022*; 6:00 pm, ESPN+		at Miami (OH); Hoosier Tip-Off Classic	L 78–95	0–6	Millett Hall (1,388); Oxford, OH
December 3, 2022*; 2:00 pm, ESPN+		at SMU	W 69–68	1–6	Moody Coliseum (3,632); University Park, TX
December 6, 2022*; 7:00 pm, ESPN+		at No. 24 TCU	L 51–78	1–7	Schollmaier Arena (5,097); Fort Worth, TX
December 11, 2022*; 1:00 pm, ESPN+		at Akron	L 72–85	1–8	James A. Rhodes Arena (1,385); Akron, OH
December 14, 2022*; 6:00 pm, SECN+		at No. 17 Mississippi State	L 59–69	1–9	Mississippi Coliseum (3,206); Jackson, MS
December 17, 2022*; 3:00 pm		vs. Texas Tech	L 52–102	1–10	Delmar Fieldhouse (1,424); Houston, TX
December 20, 2022*; 6:00 pm, SECN		at No. 9 Alabama	L 64–84	1–11	Coleman Coliseum (8,803); Tuscaloosa, AL
December 22, 2022*; 6:30 pm, ESPN+		at Stephen F. Austin	L 69–80	1–12	William R. Johnson Coliseum (1,841); Nacogdoches, TX
SWAC regular season
January 2, 2023; 7:00 pm		at Alcorn State	W 67–66	2–12 (1–0)	Davey Whitney Complex (4,721); Lorman, MS
January 7, 2023; 5:30 pm		Alabama State	W 61–58	3–12 (2–0)	Williams Assembly Center (2,734); Jackson, MS
January 9, 2023; 7:30 pm		Alabama A&M	W 72–64	4–12 (3–0)	Williams Assembly Center; Jackson, MS
January 14, 2023; 5:30 pm		at Prairie View A&M	L 50–59	4–13 (3–1)	William Nicks Building (970); Prairie View, TX
January 16, 2023; 8:00 pm		at Texas Southern	L 82–84	4–14 (3–2)	H&PE Arena (3,152); Houston, TX
January 21, 2023; 3:30 pm		Bethune–Cookman	W 70–66	5–14 (4–2)	Williams Assembly Center (1,790); Jackson, MS
January 23, 2023; 7:30 pm		Florida A&M	W 59–58	6–14 (5–2)	Williams Assembly Center; Jackson, MS
January 28, 2023; 3:30 pm		at Grambling State	L 66–78	6–15 (5–3)	Fredrick C. Hobdy Assembly Center (1,943); Grambling, LA
January 30, 2023; 7:00 pm, ESPNU		at Southern	L 62–73	6–16 (5–4)	F. G. Clark Center (7,489); Baton Rouge, LA
February 4, 2023; 5:30 pm		Mississippi Valley State	L 78–82	6–17 (5–5)	Williams Assembly Center; Jackson, MS
February 6, 2023; 7:30 pm		Arkansas–Pine Bluff	W 88–84 ^{2OT}	7–17 (6–5)	Williams Assembly Center (1,134); Jackson, MS
February 11, 2023; 5:30 pm		at Florida A&M	W 69–58	8–17 (7–5)	Al Lawson Center (1,777); Tallahassee, FL
February 13, 2023; 7:00 pm		at Bethune–Cookman	W 91–64	9–17 (8–5)	Moore Gymnasium (961); Daytona Beach, FL
February 18, 2023; 3:00 pm		Alcorn State	L 60–75	9–18 (8–6)	Williams Assembly Center (1,325); Jackson, MS
February 25, 2023; 5:30 pm		Texas Southern	W 71–69	10–18 (9–6)	Williams Assembly Center (2,121); Jackson, MS
February 27, 2023; 7:30 pm		Prairie View A&M	W 61–57	11–18 (10–6)	Williams Assembly Center (1,571); Jackson, MS
March 2, 2023; 8:00 pm		at Arkansas–Pine Bluff	W 67–63	12–18 (11–6)	H.O. Clemmons Arena (2,875); Pine Bluff, AR
March 4, 2023; 6:00 pm		at Mississippi Valley State	W 68–60	13–18 (12–6)	Harrison HPER Complex (1,497); Itta Bena, MS
SWAC tournament
March 9, 2022; 2:00 pm, ESPN+	(3)	vs. (6) Prairie View A&M; Quarterfinals	W 62–60 ^{OT}	14–18	Bartow Arena (684); Birmingham, AL
March 10, 2022; 8:30 pm, ESPN+	(3)	vs. (2) Grambling State; Semifinals	L 69–78	14–19	Bartow Arena (1,792); Birmingham, AL
*Non-conference game. ^{#}Rankings from AP Poll. (#) Tournament seedings in parentheses. All times are in Central.
