= 2022–23 Mississippi Valley State Delta Devils basketball team =

American college basketball season

2022–23 Mississippi Valley State Delta Devils basketball
- Conference: Southwestern Athletic Conference
- Record: 5–27 (4–14 SWAC)
- Head coach: George Ivory (1st season)
- Assistant coaches: Alan Perry; Derrick Fears; Trasity Totten
- Home arena: Harrison HPER Complex

2022–23 SWAC men's basketball standings
	Conf.				Overall
Team	W		L	PCT	W		L	PCT
Alcorn State	15	–	3	.833	18	–	14	.563
Grambling State	15	–	3	.833	24	–	9	.727
Jackson State	12	–	6	.667	14	–	19	.424
Southern	11	–	7	.611	15	–	17	.469
Alabama A&M	10	–	8	.556	15	–	18	.455
Prairie View A&M	9	–	9	.500	13	–	19	.406
Bethune–Cookman	8	–	10	.444	12	–	20	.375
Texas Southern †	7	–	11	.389	14	–	21	.400
Alabama State	6	–	12	.333	8	–	23	.258
Arkansas–Pine Bluff	6	–	12	.333	10	–	21	.323
Florida A&M	5	–	13	.278	7	–	22	.241
Mississippi Valley State	4	–	14	.222	5	–	27	.156
† 2023 SWAC tournament winner

The 2022–23 Mississippi Valley State Delta Devils basketball team represented Mississippi Valley State University (MSVU) during the 2022–23 NCAA Division I men's basketball season. The Delta Devils were led by first-year head coach George Ivory. They played their home games at the Harrison HPER Complex in Itta Bena, Mississippi as members of the Southwestern Athletic Conference (SWAC).

The Delta Devils finished the season 5–27, 4–14 in SWAC play, to finish in last place. They failed to qualify for the SWAC tournament, as only the top eight teams make it.

== Previous season ==
The Delta Devils finished the 2021–22 season 2–26, 2–16 in SWAC play, to finish 12th in the conference. They failed to qualify for the SWAC tournament.

With three games remaining in the season, head coach Lindsey Hunter was suspended. The school named former Arkansas–Pine Bluff head coach and MVSU player George Ivory the interim coach. On March 11, 2022, Hunter resigned as head coach. On March 14, the school named interim coach George Ivory as the team's new head coach.

== Roster ==
2022–23 Mississippi Valley State Delta Devils men's basketball team
Players
Coaches

Pos.	#	Name	Height	Weight	Year	Hometown
G	0	Rayquan Brown	6 ft 6 in (1.98 m)	190 lb (86 kg)	Jr	Atlanta, GA
G/F	1	Tyronn Mosley	6 ft 6 in (1.98 m)	210 lb (95 kg)	Jr	Chicago, IL
G/F	2	Arecko Gipson	6 ft 7 in (2.01 m)	210 lb (95 kg)	Jr	Memphis, TN
G	3	Kadar Waller	6 ft 0 in (1.83 m)	170 lb (77 kg)	So	Bakersfield, CA
F	5	Walter Hamilton	6 ft 8 in (2.03 m)	220 lb (100 kg)	Jr	Potts Camp, MS
G	10	Danny Washington	6 ft 0 in (1.83 m)	175 lb (79 kg)	Jr	Greenville, MS
G	11	Terry Collins	6 ft 3 in (1.91 m)	175 lb (79 kg)	Sr	Kenner, LA
G	12	Amani Harris	6 ft 2 in (1.88 m)	170 lb (77 kg)	Jr	Inglewood, CA
G/F	13	Charles Jones	6 ft 5 in (1.96 m)	205 lb (93 kg)	GS	Detroit, MI
G	14	George III Ivory	6 ft 2 in (1.88 m)	170 lb (77 kg)	So	Jackson, MS
F	15	Alvin Stredic	6 ft 8 in (2.03 m)	220 lb (100 kg)	Jr	Bay City, TX
C	20	Quoiren Waldon	6 ft 9 in (2.06 m)	220 lb (100 kg)	So	Atlanta, GA
C	21	Ronald Williams	6 ft 8 in (2.03 m)	215 lb (98 kg)	Sr	Killeen, TX
F/C	22	Michael Barber	6 ft 8 in (2.03 m)	225 lb (102 kg)	GS	Jackson, MS
F	24	Ernest Minton	6 ft 5 in (1.96 m)	190 lb (86 kg)	Jr	Indianola, MS
G	33	Jordan Johnson	6 ft 4 in (1.93 m)	195 lb (88 kg)	Sr	Memphis, TN
C	35	Daniel Umoh	6 ft 9 in (2.06 m)	245 lb (111 kg)	So	Lagos, Nigeria

Head coach

- George Ivory (Mississippi Valley State)

Assistant coach(es)

- Alan Perry
- Derrick Fears
- Trasity Totten (Arkansas–Pine Bluff)

Legend

- (C) Team captain
- (S) Suspended
- (I) Ineligible
- (W) Walk-on
- Injured
- Current redshirt

Roster
Last update: February 23, 2022

== Schedule and results ==
Date time, TV	Rank^{#}	Opponent^{#}	Result	Record	Site (attendance) city, state
Non-conference regular season
November 7, 2022*; 11:00 a.m., Big 12 Now		at No. 5 Baylor	L 53–117	0–1	Ferrell Center (10,284); Waco, TX
November 11, 2022*; 11:00pm, Spectrum Sports		at Hawaii; Outrigger Rainbow Classic	L 54–72	0–2	Stan Sheriff Center (5,067); Honolulu, HI
November 13, 2022*; 6:30 p.m.		vs. Yale; Outrigger Rainbow Classic	L 51–80	0–3	Stan Sheriff Center; Honolulu, HI
November 14, 2022*; 8:30 p.m.		vs. Eastern Washington; Outrigger Rainbow Classic	L 52–60	0–4	Stan Sheriff Center; Honolulu, HI
November 18, 2022*; 7:00 p.m.		North Alabama	W 76–68	1–4	Harrison HPER Complex (1,109); Itta Bena, MS
November 20, 2022*; 6:30 p.m., SECN+		at Missouri; Collegiate Hoops Roadshow	L 62–83	1–5	Mizzou Arena (7,052); Columbia, MO
November 23, 2022*; 5:00 p.m., MW Network		at Air Force; Collegiate Hoops Roadshow	L 51–64	1–6	Clune Arena (1,490); Colorado Springs, CO
November 26, 2022*; 2:00 p.m., MW Network		at Colorado State	L 45–88	1–7	Moby Arena (3,884); Fort Collins, CO
December 1, 2022*; 7:00 p.m., ESPN+		at Arkansas State	L 38–58	1–8	First National Bank Arena (2,274); Jonesboro, AR
December 3, 2022*; 1:00 p.m., SECN		at Mississippi State	L 52–82	1–9	Humphrey Coliseum (6,343); Starkville, MS
December 13, 2022*; 7:00 p.m., ESPN+		at Wichita State	L 48–71	1–10	Charles Koch Arena (7,056); Wichita, KS
December 16, 2022*; 7:00pm, ESPN+		at Tulsa	L 51–66	1–11	Reynolds Center (3,004); Tulsa, OK
December 18, 2022*; 4:00 p.m., Big 12 Now		at No. 21 TCU	L 43–88	1–12	Schollmaier Arena (5,201); Fort Worth, TX
December 21, 2022*; 7:00 p.m., ESPN+		at Tulane	L 63–84	1–13	Devlin Fieldhouse; New Orleans, LA
SWAC regular season
January 2, 2023; 7:00 p.m.		at Alabama State	L 61–70	1–14 (0–1)	Dunn–Oliver Acadome (438); Montgomery, AL
January 4, 2023; 7:00 p.m.		at Alabama A&M	L 68–75	1–15 (0–2)	Alabama A&M Events Center (2,275); Huntsville, AL
January 7, 2023; 6:00 p.m.		Prairie View A&M	L 60–67	1–16 (0–3)	Harrison HPER Complex (2,701); Itta Bena, MS
January 9, 2023; 7:30 p.m.		Texas Southern	W 71–67	2–16 (1–3)	Harrison HPER Complex (1,908); Itta Bena, MS
January 14, 2023; 6:00 p.m.		at Bethune–Cookman	L 71–77	2–17 (1–4)	Moore Gymnasium (724); Daytona Beach, FL
January 16, 2023; 7:30 p.m.		at Florida A&M	L 59–60	2–18 (1–5)	Al Lawson Center (1,435); Tallahassee, FL
January 21, 2023; 6:00 p.m.		Grambling State	L 61–65	2–19 (1–6)	Harrison HPER Complex (2,109); Itta Bena, MS
January 23, 2023; 7:30 p.m.		Southern	L 70–84	2–20 (1–7)	Harrison HPER Complex (1,409); Itta Bena, MS
January 28, 2023; 6:00 p.m.		at Arkansas–Pine Bluff	L 72–88	2–21 (1–8)	H.O. Clemmons Arena (2,395); Pine Bluff, AR
February 4, 2023; 6:00 p.m.		at Jackson State	W 82–78	3–21 (2–8)	Williams Assembly Center; Jackson, MS
February 6, 2023; 8:00 p.m.		at Alcorn State	L 70–81	3–22 (2–9)	Davey Whitney Complex (3,900); Lorman, MS
February 11, 2023; 6:00 p.m.		Alabama A&M	L 68–70 ^{2OT}	3–23 (2–10)	Harrison HPER Complex (976); Itta Bena, MS
February 13, 2023; 5:00 p.m.		Alabama State	W 76–70	4–23 (3–10)	Harrison HPER Complex (1,024); Itta Bena, MS
February 18, 2023; 6:00 p.m.		at Texas Southern	L 62–80	4–24 (3–11)	H&PE Arena (1,133); Houston, TX
February 20, 2023; 8:00 p.m.		at Prairie View A&M	L 65–67	4–25 (3–12)	William Nicks Building (1,071); Prairie View, TX
February 25, 2023; 6:00 p.m.		Arkansas–Pine Bluff	W 78–74	5–25 (4–12)	Harrison HPER Complex (1,205); Itta Bena, MS
March 2, 2023; 7:30 p.m.		Alcorn State	L 60–70	5–26 (4–13)	Harrison HPER Complex (1,309); Itta Bena, MS
March 4, 2023; 7:30 p.m.		Jackson State	L 60–68	5–27 (4–14)	Harrison HPER Complex (1,497); Itta Bena, MS
*Non-conference game. ^{#}Rankings from AP poll. (#) Tournament seedings in parentheses. All times are in Central.
