= 2022–23 Bethune–Cookman Wildcats men's basketball team =

American college basketball season

2022–23 Bethune–Cookman Wildcats men's basketball
- Conference: Southwestern Athletic Conference
- Record: 12–20 (8–10 SWAC)
- Head coach: Reggie Theus (2nd season)
- Associate head coach: Chris Pompey
- Assistant coaches: Billy Garrett; Richard Grant
- Home arena: Moore Gymnasium

2022–23 SWAC men's basketball standings
	Conf.				Overall
Team	W		L	PCT	W		L	PCT
Alcorn State	15	–	3	.833	18	–	14	.563
Grambling State	15	–	3	.833	24	–	9	.727
Jackson State	12	–	6	.667	14	–	19	.424
Southern	11	–	7	.611	15	–	17	.469
Alabama A&M	10	–	8	.556	15	–	18	.455
Prairie View A&M	9	–	9	.500	13	–	19	.406
Bethune–Cookman	8	–	10	.444	12	–	20	.375
Texas Southern †	7	–	11	.389	14	–	21	.400
Alabama State	6	–	12	.333	8	–	23	.258
Arkansas–Pine Bluff	6	–	12	.333	10	–	21	.323
Florida A&M	5	–	13	.278	7	–	22	.241
Mississippi Valley State	4	–	14	.222	5	–	27	.156
† 2023 SWAC tournament winner

The 2022–23 Bethune–Cookman Wildcats men's basketball team represented Bethune–Cookman University in the 2022–23 NCAA Division I men's basketball season. The Wildcats, led by second-year head coach Reggie Theus, played their home games at Moore Gymnasium in Daytona Beach, Florida as members of the Southwestern Athletic Conference (SWAC).

== Previous season ==
The Wildcats finished the 2021–22 season 9–21, 7–11 in SWAC play, to finish in tenth place. They failed to qualify for the SWAC tournament.

== Roster ==
2022–23 Bethune–Cookman Wildcats men's basketball team
Players
Coaches

Pos.	#	Name	Height	Weight	Year	Hometown
G	0	Jayson Mathews	5 ft 10 in (1.78 m)	150 lb (68 kg)	Fr	Sacramento, CA
G	1	Zion Harmon	6 ft 0 in (1.83 m)	165 lb (75 kg)	Fr	Temple Hills, MD
G	2	Lukas Gudavicius	6 ft 10 in (2.08 m)	225 lb (102 kg)	Fr	Vilnius, Lithuania
G	3	Marcus Garrett	6 ft 2 in (1.88 m)	185 lb (84 kg)	RS Sr	Chicago, IL
F	4	Kuon Kuon	6 ft 9 in (2.06 m)	185 lb (84 kg)	Fr	Omaha, NE
G	5	Damani McEntire	6 ft 4 in (1.93 m)	205 lb (93 kg)	Jr	Indianapolis, IN
G	10	Dhashon Dyson	6 ft 1 in (1.85 m)	170 lb (77 kg)	Jr	Chicago, IL
G	11	Donovann Toatley	5 ft 10 in (1.78 m)	175 lb (79 kg)	Jr	Largo, MD
G/F	12	Kevin Davis	6 ft 6 in (1.98 m)	195 lb (88 kg)	RS Sr	Portsmouth, VA
G	15	Simeon Womack	6 ft 2 in (1.88 m)	170 lb (77 kg)	Fr	Jacksonville, FL
G	21	Trayvon Barbary	6 ft 4 in (1.93 m)	175 lb (79 kg)	Fr	DeLand, FL
C	22	Dylan Robertson	6 ft 10 in (2.08 m)	205 lb (93 kg)	Sr	Tuscaloosa, AL
F	23	Derrick Jr. Carter-Hollinger	6 ft 6 in (1.98 m)	200 lb (91 kg)	Jr	San Diego, CA
G	30	Joe French	6 ft 5 in (1.96 m)	170 lb (77 kg)	Jr	Orlando, FL
C	32	Elijah Hulsewe	7 ft 0 in (2.13 m)	260 lb (118 kg)	Fr	Orlando, FL
C	33	James Jr. Henderson	6 ft 9 in (2.06 m)	230 lb (104 kg)	Fr	Miami, FL

Head coach

- Reggie Theus (UNLV)

Assistant coach(es)

- Chris Pompey (Pittsburgh)
- Billy Garrett (DePaul)
- Richard Grant (Bridgeport)

Legend

- (C) Team captain
- (S) Suspended
- (I) Ineligible
- (W) Walk-on
- Injured
- Current redshirt

Roster
Last update: December 12, 2022

== Schedule and results ==
Date time, TV	Rank^{#}	Opponent^{#}	Result	Record	High points	High rebounds	High assists	Site (attendance) city, state
Non-conference regular season
November 7, 2022*; 7:00 p.m., ESPNU		at Iowa	L 58–89	0–1	15 – Harmon	6 – 2 tied	7 – Harmon	Carver–Hawkeye Arena (9,545); Iowa City, IA
November 10, 2022*; 8:30 p.m., BTN		at No. 13 Indiana	L 49–101	0–2	11 – French	3 – 3 tied	4 – Garrett	Simon Skjodt Assembly Hall (17,222); Bloomington, IN
November 14, 2022*; 7:00 p.m., Cateye Network		Florida National	W 71–57	1–2	19 – 2 tied	10 – Robertson	5 – Harmon	Moore Gymnasium (351); Daytona Beach, FL
November 16, 2022*; 8:00 p.m., Cateye Network		Trinity Baptist	W 83–46	2–2	15 – Harmon	10 – Garrett	10 – Garrett	Moore Gymnasium (451); Daytona Beach, FL
November 21, 2022*; 7:00 p.m., ESPN+		at Charleston Southern	L 63–78	2–3	16 – French	7 – Garrett	2 – 2 tied	Buccaneer Field House (126); North Charleston, SC
November 26, 2022*; 4:00 p.m.		vs. Idaho State; Central Arkansas Classic	W 68–66 ^{OT}	3–3	16 – Davis	7 – Robertson	5 – Harmon	Farris Center (97); Conway, AR
November 27, 2022*; 2:00 p.m.		vs. Northwestern State; Central Arkansas Classic	L 66–69	3–4	16 – Harmon	10 – Davis	4 – McEntire	Farris Center (215); Conway, AR
December 1, 2022*; 8:00 p.m., Cateye Network		Chicago State	W 86–73	4–4	21 – 2 tied	8 – Davis	4 – McEntire	Moore Gymnasium (631); Daytona Beach, FL
December 10, 2022*; 2:00 p.m., ESPN+		at North Florida	L 48–88	4–5	10 – Robertson	6 – 2 tied	3 – McEntire	UNF Arena (1,409); Jacksonville, FL
December 16, 2022*; 7:30 p.m., ESPN+		at Incarnate Word	L 65–77	4–6	17 – Harmon	10 – Carter-Hollinger Jr.	3 – 2 tied	McDermott Center (195); San Antonio, TX
December 18, 2022*; 4:00 p.m.		at UTSA	L 69–90	4–7	27 – French	5 – 4 tied	4 – Harmon	Convocation Center (774); San Antonio, TX
December 22, 2022*; 2:00 p.m., Cateye Network		North Florida	L 85–87	4–8	27 – Garrett	6 – Davis	4 – McEntire	Moore Gymnasium (105); Daytona Beach, FL
December 29, 2022*; 8:30 p.m., FS1		at Illinois	L 52–85	4–9	13 – Davis	9 – McEntire	3 – Harmon	State Farm Center (15,544); Champaign, IL
SWAC regular season
January 2, 2023; 7:30 p.m.		at Florida A&M	W 67–59	5–9 (1–0)	14 – 3 tied	8 – McEntire	2 – 4 tied	Al Lawson Center (3,287); Tallahassee, FL
January 7, 2023; 6:30 p.m.		at Grambling State	L 70–76	5–10 (1–1)	20 – Garrett	6 – 2 tied	3 – Harmon	Fredrick C. Hobdy Assembly Center (1,300); Grambling, LA
January 9, 2023; 9:00 p.m.		at Southern	L 75–102	5–11 (1–2)	36 – Harmon	6 – 2 tied	3 – McEntire	F. G. Clark Center (3,932); Baton Rouge, LA
January 14, 2023; 4:00 p.m., Cateye Network		Mississippi Valley State	W 77–71	6–11 (2–2)	31 – French	10 – Garrett	5 – Garrett	Moore Gymnasium (724); Daytona Beach, FL
January 16, 2023; 7:30 p.m., Cateye Network		Arkansas–Pine Bluff	L 71–77	6–12 (2–3)	21 – Garrett	14 – Davis	4 – Harmon	Moore Gymnasium (613); Daytona Beach, FL
January 21, 2023; 4:00 p.m.		at Jackson State	L 66–70	6–13 (2–4)	20 – Harmon	9 – Davis	6 – Garrett	Williams Assembly Center (1,790); Jackson, MS
January 23, 2023; 8:00 p.m.		at Alcorn State	L 68–76	6–14 (2–5)	22 – Harmon	14 – Davis	4 – Harmon	Davey Whitney Complex (3,100); Lorman, MS
January 28, 2023; 4:00 p.m., Cateye Network		Alabama State	W 64–62	7–14 (3–5)	19 – Garrett	11 – Davis	3 – Garrett	Moore Gymnasium (669); Daytona Beach, FL
January 30, 2023; 7:30 p.m., Cateye Network		Alabama A&M	W 88–77	8–14 (4–5)	23 – Dyson	8 – Garrett	6 – Garrett	Moore Gymnasium (631); Daytona Beach, FL
February 4, 2023; 4:00 p.m.		at Prairie View A&M	W 60–58	9–14 (5–5)	14 – Harmon	11 – Garrett	2 – tied	William Nicks Building; Prairie View, TX
February 6, 2023; 9:00 p.m., ESPNU		at Texas Southern	L 62–69	9–15 (5–6)	20 – Garrett	9 – Garrett	2 – tied	H&PE Arena (2,912); Houston, TX
February 11, 2023; 4:00 p.m., Cateye Network		Alcorn State	L 74–76	9–16 (5–7)	18 – Davis	8 – Garrett	9 – Harmon	Moore Gymnasium (956); Daytona Beach, FL
February 13, 2023; 7:30 p.m., Cateye Network		Jackson State	L 64–91	9–17 (5–8)	21 – Garrett	10 – Garrett	2 – tied	Moore Gymnasium (961); Daytona Beach, FL
February 18, 2023; 8:00 p.m.		at Alabama A&M	L 56–90	9–18 (5–9)	16 – French	5 – Henderson Jr.	4 – Harmon	Alabama A&M Events Center (2,500); Huntsville, AL
February 20, 2023; 7:30 p.m.		at Alabama State	W 70–65	10–18 (6–9)	20 – Dyson	10 – Davis	5 – Garrett	Dunn–Oliver Acadome (677); Montgomery, AL
February 25, 2023; 4:00 p.m., Cateye Network		Southern	W 60–53	11–18 (7–9)	19 – Harmon	7 – Garrett	4 – Garrett	Moore Gymnasium (961); Daytona Beach, FL
February 27, 2023; 7:30 p.m., Cateye Network		Grambling State	L 54–66	11–19 (7–10)	17 – Davis	9 – Davis	3 – Dyson	Moore Gymnasium (934); Daytona Beach, FL
March 4, 2023; 4:00 p.m., Cateye Network		Florida A&M	W 91–70	12–19 (8–10)	29 – Harmon	10 – Davis	4 – Garrett	Moore Gymnasium (961); Daytona Beach, FL
SWAC tournament
March 8, 2023; 2:00 p.m., ESPN+	(7)	vs. (2) Grambling State; Quarterfinals	L 72–87	12–20	21 – Davis	6 – tied	5 – tied	Bartow Arena (478); Birmingham, AL
*Non-conference game. ^{#}Rankings from AP poll. (#) Tournament seedings in parentheses. All times are in Eastern.
