= 2022–23 Florida A&M Rattlers basketball team =

American college basketball season

2022–23 Florida A&M Rattlers basketball
- Conference: Southwestern Athletic Conference
- Record: 7–22 (5–13 SWAC)
- Head coach: Robert McCullum (6th season)
- Assistant coaches: Willie Powers III; Isaac Brown; Craig Brown
- Home arena: Al Lawson Center

2022–23 SWAC men's basketball standings
	Conf.				Overall
Team	W		L	PCT	W		L	PCT
Alcorn State	15	–	3	.833	18	–	14	.563
Grambling State	15	–	3	.833	24	–	9	.727
Jackson State	12	–	6	.667	14	–	19	.424
Southern	11	–	7	.611	15	–	17	.469
Alabama A&M	10	–	8	.556	15	–	18	.455
Prairie View A&M	9	–	9	.500	13	–	19	.406
Bethune–Cookman	8	–	10	.444	12	–	20	.375
Texas Southern †	7	–	11	.389	14	–	21	.400
Alabama State	6	–	12	.333	8	–	23	.258
Arkansas–Pine Bluff	6	–	12	.333	10	–	21	.323
Florida A&M	5	–	13	.278	7	–	22	.241
Mississippi Valley State	4	–	14	.222	5	–	27	.156
† 2023 SWAC tournament winner

The 2022–23 Florida A&M Rattlers basketball team represented Florida A&M University in the 2022–23 NCAA Division I men's basketball season. The Rattlers, led by sixth-year head coach Robert McCullum, played their home games at the Al Lawson Center in Tallahassee, Florida as members of the Southwestern Athletic Conference (SWAC).

The Rattlers finished the season 7–22, 5–13 in SWAC play, to finish in eleventh place. They failed to qualify for the SWAC tournament, as only the top eight teams make it.

== Previous season ==
The Rattlers finished the 2021–22 season 13–17, 11–7 in SWAC play, to finish in fourth place. As the No. 4 seed, they were defeated by No. 5 seed Alabama A&M in the quarterfinals of the SWAC tournament.

== Roster ==
2022–23 Florida A&M Rattlers men's basketball team
Players
Coaches

Pos.	#	Name	Height	Weight	Year	Hometown
G	0	Dimingus Stevens	6 ft 6 in (1.98 m)	180 lb (82 kg)	Jr	Washington, D.C.
G	1	Byron Smith	6 ft 2 in (1.88 m)	185 lb (84 kg)	Jr	Palatka, FL
G	2	Jordan Chatman	6 ft 5 in (1.96 m)	208 lb (94 kg)	So	Birmingham, AL
F	3	Peyton Williams	6 ft 7 in (2.01 m)	205 lb (93 kg)	RS So	Tampa, FL
G	4	Hantz Louis-Jeune	6 ft 6 in (1.98 m)	180 lb (82 kg)	Jr	Lake Worth Beach, FL
F	5	Jaylen Bates	6 ft 7 in (2.01 m)	215 lb (98 kg)	Jr	Atlanta, GA
F	10	Chase Barrs	6 ft 9 in (2.06 m)	210 lb (95 kg)	Sr	Tampa, FL
G	13	Miles Hall	6 ft 3 in (1.91 m)	170 lb (77 kg)	Fr	Windermere, FL
F	14	Tarig Eisa	6 ft 8 in (2.03 m)	210 lb (95 kg)	Jr	Toronto, ON
G	15	Noah Meren	6 ft 5 in (1.96 m)	200 lb (91 kg)	GS	Providence, RI
F	20	Matthew Webster	6 ft 8 in (2.03 m)	205 lb (93 kg)	Fr	Dade City, FL
F	22	Saiyd Burnside	6 ft 9 in (2.06 m)	210 lb (95 kg)	RS Fr	Greenville, SC
G	23	Jordan Tillmon	6 ft 2 in (1.88 m)	180 lb (82 kg)	Jr	Pine Bluff, AR
C	24	Wylie III Howard	6 ft 11 in (2.11 m)	250 lb (113 kg)	RS Sr	Lauderhill, FL
G	30	Chris Peterson	6 ft 2 in (1.88 m)	185 lb (84 kg)	Jr	Gifford, FL
G	32	Austin Ezell	6 ft 1 in (1.85 m)	180 lb (82 kg)	RS Fr	Carmel, IN
G	34	Richard Mathews	6 ft 3 in (1.91 m)	180 lb (82 kg)	So	Estero, FL
C	40	Legend Stamps	6 ft 9 in (2.06 m)	220 lb (100 kg)	Sr	Rancho Cucamonga, CA
F	55	Alex Andrews	6 ft 7 in (2.01 m)	200 lb (91 kg)	RS So	Ocoee, FL

Head coach

- Robert McCullum (Birmingham–Southern)

Assistant coach(es)

- Willie Powers III (Georgia Southern)
- Isaac Brown (Florida A&M)
- Craig Brown (Florida)

Legend

- (C) Team captain
- (S) Suspended
- (I) Ineligible
- (W) Walk-on
- Injured
- Current redshirt

Roster
Last update: December 27, 2022

== Schedule and results ==
Date time, TV	Rank^{#}	Opponent^{#}	Result	Record	High points	High rebounds	High assists	Site (attendance) city, state
Non-conference regular season
November 7, 2022*; 10:00 p.m., P12N		at No. 21 Oregon; SWAC/Pac-12 Legacy Series	L 45–80	0–1	8 – 2 tied	5 – 2 tied	2 – 2 tied	Matthew Knight Arena (5,897); Eugene, OR
November 9, 2022*; 10:30 p.m., WCC Network		at Portland	L 54–91	0–2	16 – Tillmon	6 – Eisa	2 – 2 tied	Chiles Center (1,107); Portland, OR
November 11, 2022*; 9:00 p.m., P12N		at Oregon State	L 43–60	0–3	12 – Tillmon	10 – Barrs	4 – Smith	Gill Coliseum (4,778); Corvallis, OR
November 15, 2022*; 7:00 p.m., ACCNX/ESPN+		at Miami (FL)	L 61–87	0–4	12 – 2 tied	7 – 2 tied	3 – 2 tied	Watsco Center (4,339); Coral Gables, FL
November 21, 2022*; 7:00 p.m., Facebook Live		Albany State	W 70–65 ^{OT}	1–4	18 – Chatman	13 – Bates	4 – Louis-Jeune	Al Lawson Center (1,236); Tallahassee, FL
November 30, 2022*; 8:00 p.m., SECN+/ESPN+		at Florida	L 62–102	1–5	20 – Smith	7 – Louis-Jeune	2 – 4 tied	O'Connell Center (6,515); Gainesville, FL
December 2, 2022*; 7:00 p.m., SECN+/ESPN+		at Georgia	L 46–68	1–6	12 – Chatman	6 – Barrs	2 – 4 tied	Stegeman Coliseum (6,673); Athens, GA
December 13, 2022*; 7:00 p.m., Facebook Live		Edward Waters	W 58–47	2–6	13 – Bates	12 – Bates	4 – Tillmon	Al Lawson Center (153); Tallahassee, FL
December 17, 2022*; 2:00 p.m., ACCN/ESPN+		at Louisville	L 55–61	2–7	17 – Tillmon	7 – Bates	2 – 2 tied	KFC Yum! Center (11,736); Louisville, KY
December 21, 2022*; 7:00 p.m., SECN		at No. 19 Kentucky	L 68–88	2–8	21 – Bates	5 – Bates	3 – 2 tied	Rupp Arena (20,266); Lexington, KY
December 29, 2022*; 5:00 p.m., BTN		at No. 1 Purdue	L 49–82	2–9	8 – tied	6 – Tillmon	2 – tied	Mackey Arena (14,876); West Lafayette, IN
SWAC regular season
January 2, 2023; 7:30 p.m., Facebook Live		Bethune–Cookman	L 59–67	2–10 (0–1)	19 – Tillmon	14 – Bates	3 – Louis-Jeune	Al Lawson Center (3,287); Tallahassee, FL
January 7, 2023; 6:30 p.m.		at Southern	L 66–84	2–11 (0–2)	23 – Stevens	4 – Meren	4 – tied	F. G. Clark Center (3,157); Baton Rouge, LA
January 9, 2023; 8:00 p.m.		at Grambling State	L 57–62	2–12 (0–3)	13 – Stevens	9 – Bates	5 – Chatman	Fredrick C. Hobdy Assembly Center (1,362); Grambling, LA
January 14, 2023; 4:00 p.m., Facebook Live		Arkansas–Pine Bluff	L 54–67	2–13 (0–4)	15 – Chatman	8 – Bates	4 – Tillmon	Al Lawson Center (1,587); Tallahassee, FL
January 16, 2023; 7:30 p.m., Facebook Live		Mississippi Valley State	W 60–59	3–13 (1–4)	24 – Stevens	9 – Bates	3 – Meren	Al Lawson Center (1,435); Tallahassee, FL
January 21, 2023; 5:00 p.m.		at Alcorn State	L 47–57	3–14 (1–5)	14 – Bates	11 – Bates	2 – Tillmon	Davey Whitney Complex (3,356); Lorman, MS
January 23, 2023; 8:30 p.m.		at Jackson State	L 58–59	3–15 (1–6)	13 – Tillmon	6 – Eisa	4 – Tillmon	Williams Assembly Center; Jackson, MS
January 28, 2023; 4:00 p.m., Facebook Live		Alabama A&M	L 56–61	3–16 (1–7)	15 – Meren	6 – Tillmon	5 – Tillmon	Al Lawson Center (1,724); Tallahassee, FL
January 30, 2023; 8:00 p.m., HBCU Go		Alabama State	W 69–58	4–16 (2–7)	15 – 3 tied	8 – Bates	4 – Tillmon	Al Lawson Center (2,128); Tallahassee, FL
February 4, 2023; 6:00 p.m., YouTube		at Texas Southern	W 76–69	5–16 (3–7)	20 – Meren	10 – Meren	3 – 2 tied	H&PE Arena (3,892); Houston, TX
February 6, 2023; 8:30 p.m.		at Prairie View A&M	L 45–75	5–17 (3–8)	14 – Meren	9 – Bates	4 – Meren	William Nicks Building (1,890); Prairie View, TX
February 11, 2023; 4:00 p.m., Facebook Live		Jackson State	L 58–69	5–18 (3–9)	15 – Smith	12 – Bates	2 – 2 tied	Al Lawson Center (1,777); Tallahassee, FL
February 13, 2023; 7:30 p.m., Facebook Live		Alcorn State	L 64–67	5–19 (3–10)	15 – Bates	7 – 2 tied	4 – 2 tied	Al Lawson Center (1,443); Tallahassee, FL
February 18, 2023; 6:30 p.m.		at Alabama State	W 60–54	6–19 (4–10)	16 – Smith	11 – Bates	4 – Tillmon	Dunn–Oliver Acadome; Montgomery, AL
February 20, 2023; 9:00 p.m., ESPNU		at Alabama A&M	W 77–71	7–19 (5–10)	22 – Tillmon	10 – Bates	3 – Meren	Alabama A&M Events Center (3,277); Huntsville, AL
February 25, 2023; 4:00 p.m., Facebook Live		Grambling State	L 55–69	7–20 (5–11)	11 – 2 tied	9 – Chatman	2 – 2 tied	Al Lawson Center (900); Tallahassee, FL
February 27, 2023; 7:30 p.m., Facebook Live		Southern	L 58–60	7–21 (5–12)	16 – Stevens	8 – Meren	4 – Tillmon	Al Lawson Center (1,898); Tallahassee, FL
March 4, 2023; 4:00 p.m.		at Bethune–Cookman	L 70–91	7–22 (5–13)	20 – Meren	7 – Eisa	2 – Smith	Moore Gymnasium (961); Daytona Beach, FL
*Non-conference game. ^{#}Rankings from AP poll. (#) Tournament seedings in parentheses. All times are in Eastern.
