= 2022–23 Alabama A&M Bulldogs basketball team =

American college basketball season

2022–23 Alabama A&M Bulldogs basketball
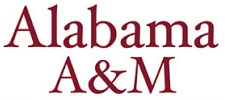
- Conference: Southwestern Athletic Conference
- Record: 15–18 (10–8 SWAC)
- Head coach: Otis Hughley Jr. (1st season)
- Associate head coach: Cal Cochran
- Assistant coaches: Rodney Broughton Jr.; Brandon Houston
- Home arena: Alabama A&M Events Center

2022–23 SWAC men's basketball standings
	Conf.				Overall
Team	W		L	PCT	W		L	PCT
Alcorn State	15	–	3	.833	18	–	14	.563
Grambling State	15	–	3	.833	24	–	9	.727
Jackson State	12	–	6	.667	14	–	19	.424
Southern	11	–	7	.611	15	–	17	.469
Alabama A&M	10	–	8	.556	15	–	18	.455
Prairie View A&M	9	–	9	.500	13	–	19	.406
Bethune–Cookman	8	–	10	.444	12	–	20	.375
Texas Southern †	7	–	11	.389	14	–	21	.400
Alabama State	6	–	12	.333	8	–	23	.258
Arkansas–Pine Bluff	6	–	12	.333	10	–	21	.323
Florida A&M	5	–	13	.278	7	–	22	.241
Mississippi Valley State	4	–	14	.222	5	–	27	.156
† 2023 SWAC tournament winner

The 2022–23 Alabama A&M Bulldogs basketball team represented Alabama A&M University in the 2022–23 NCAA Division I men's basketball season. The Bulldogs, led by first-year head coach Otis Hughley Jr., played their home games at the newly opened Alabama A&M Events Center in Huntsville, Alabama as members of the Southwestern Athletic Conference.

== Previous season ==
The Bulldogs finished the 2021–22 season 12–18, 10–8 in SWAC play to finish in fifth place. In the SWAC tournament, they defeated Florida A&M, before falling to Alcorn State in the semifinals. On March 22, Alabama A&M announced that they were parting ways with head coach Dylan Howard after five season as the head coach. On April 18, the school announced that Otis Hughley Jr. would be named the next head coach of the Bulldogs.

== Roster ==
2022–23 Alabama A&M Bulldogs men's basketball team
Players
Coaches

Pos.	#	Name	Height	Weight	Year	Hometown
G/F	0	Jayland Randall	6 ft 5 in (1.96 m)	175 lb (79 kg)	Fr	Detroit, Michigan
G	1	Messiah Thompson	5 ft 8 in (1.73 m)	170 lb (77 kg)	Jr	Atlanta, Georgia
G/F	2	Omari Peek	6 ft 6 in (1.98 m)	220 lb (100 kg)	Jr	Cincinnati, Ohio
G	3	Cameron Tucker	6 ft 1 in (1.85 m)	170 lb (77 kg)	Sr	Birmingham, Alabama
G	4	Caleb Blackwell	6 ft 0 in (1.83 m)	185 lb (84 kg)	Fr	Buford, Georgia
G	10	Garrett Hicks	6 ft 0 in (1.83 m)	170 lb (77 kg)	Sr	Madison, Alabama
F	11	Austin Harvell	6 ft 6 in (1.98 m)	215 lb (98 kg)	So	Athens, Alabama
G/F	12	Brandon Powell	6 ft 3 in (1.91 m)	205 lb (93 kg)	GS	Huntsville, Alabama
F	13	Xavier Brewer	6 ft 9 in (2.06 m)	215 lb (98 kg)	GS	Atlanta, Georgia
G/F	15	Dailin Smith	6 ft 6 in (1.98 m)	185 lb (84 kg)	Jr	Colorado Springs, Colorado
G/F	22	Lorenzo Downey	6 ft 5 in (1.96 m)	215 lb (98 kg)	So	Dartmouth, Nova Scotia
F	23	Darius Osborne	6 ft 8 in (2.03 m)	195 lb (88 kg)	Jr	Louisville, Kentucky
G	24	Eric Lee	6 ft 4 in (1.93 m)	195 lb (88 kg)	RS So	Tampa, Florida
C	30	William Tavares de Brito	6 ft 10 in (2.08 m)	250 lb (113 kg)	So	Praia, Cabo Verde
C	33	Olisa Blaise Akonobi	7 ft 0 in (2.13 m)	235 lb (107 kg)	GS	Abuja, Nigeria
C	34/20	EJ Williams	6 ft 10 in (2.08 m)	275 lb (125 kg)	Sr	Cincinnati, Ohio

Head coach

- Otis Hughley Jr. (West Alabama)

Assistant coach(es)

- Cal Cochran (Chattanooga)
- Rodney Broughton Jr. (South Alabama)
- Brandon Houston (Alabama A&M)

Legend

- (C) Team captain
- (S) Suspended
- (I) Ineligible
- (W) Walk-on
- Injured
- Current redshirt

Roster
Last update: January 14, 2023

== Schedule and results ==
Date time, TV	Rank^{#}	Opponent^{#}	Result	Record	High points	High rebounds	High assists	Site (attendance) city, state
Exhibition
November 3, 2022*; 7:00 pm		Oakwood	W 95–79	–	22 – Hicks	9 – Harvell	5 – Hicks	Elmore Gymnasium (3,124); Normal, AL
Non-conference regular season
November 10, 2022*; 7:00 pm		North Alabama	L 76–84	0–1	18 – Hicks	8 – Powell	5 – Williams	Elmore Gymnasium (1,405); Normal, AL
November 14, 2022*; 8:00 pm, ESPN+		at Tennessee State	L 76–87	0–2	23 – Smith	5 – Tucker	4 – Tucker	Gentry Complex (5,619); Nashville, TN
November 17, 2022*; 7:00 pm		Samford	L 64–84	0–3	14 – Hicks	7 – Blaise Akonobi	3 – 3 Tied	Elmore Gymnasium (1,800); Normal, AL
November 19, 2022*; 6:00 pm		vs. Norfolk State; ATL Has Something to Say HBCU Challenge	L 83–89	0–4	18 – Thompson	6 – Blaise Akonobi	4 – Tucker	Forbes Arena; Atlanta, GA
November 23, 2022*; 7:00 pm		Louisiana Tech	L 75–80	0–5	22 – Hicks	4 – 2 Tied	6 – Thompson	Alabama A&M Events Center (1,123); Huntsville, AL
November 25, 2022*; 6:00 pm		UT Southern	W 90–79	1–5	26 – Thompson	11 – Powell	5 – Hicks	Alabama A&M Events Center (1,470); Huntsville, AL
November 28, 2022*; 7:00 pm		Fisk	W 71–55	2–5	14 – Harvell	4 – Blaise Akonobi	3 – Thompson	Alabama A&M Events Center (1,560); Huntsville, AL
December 9, 2022*; 7:00 pm		Lipscomb	W 63–59	3–5	20 – Hicks	7 – 2 Tied	3 – Tucker	Elmore Gymnasium (952); Normal, AL
December 12, 2022*; 6:00 pm		South Alabama	L 71–78	3–6	23 – Peek	8 – Blaise Akonobi	4 – Tucker	Alabama A&M Events Center (451); Huntsville, AL
December 15, 2022*; 7:00 pm		Rust	W 97–75	4–6	16 – 2 Tied	6 – 2 Tied	7 – Thompson	Alabama A&M Events Center (231); Huntsville, AL
December 17, 2022*; 3:00 pm, BTN		at No. 18 Illinois	L 47–68	4–7	13 – Hicks	12 – Blaise Akonobi	2 – Smith	State Farm Center (13,813); Champaign, IL
December 22, 2022*; 3:00 pm, ESPN+		at Vanderbilt	L 62–70	4–8	15 – Thompson	11 – Blaise Akonobi	6 – Thompson	Memorial Gymnasium (5,010); Nashville, TN
December 29, 2022*; 2:00 pm, BTN		at Ohio State	L 59–90	4–9	11 – Hicks	6 – Hicks	4 – 2 Tied	Value City Arena (14,521); Columbus, OH
SWAC regular season
January 2, 2023; 7:00 pm		Arkansas–Pine Bluff	W 66–59	5–9 (1–0)	19 – Hicks	7 – 2 Tied	6 – Thompson	Alabama A&M Events Center (817); Huntsville, AL
January 4, 2023; 7:00 pm		Mississippi Valley State	W 75–68	6–9 (2–0)	23 – Hicks	7 – Blaise Akonobi	9 – Tucker	Alabama A&M Events Center (2,275); Huntsville, AL
January 7, 2023; 4:00 pm		at Alcorn State	L 76–89	6–10 (2–1)	15 – Smith	4 – 2 Tied	5 – Tucker	Davey Whitney Complex (1,150); Lorman, MS
January 9, 2023; 7:30 pm		at Jackson State	L 64–72	6–11 (2–2)	17 – Thompson	7 – Williams	3 – Thompson	Williams Assembly Center; Jackson, MS
January 16, 2023; 3:30 pm		vs. Alabama State; Bridge Builder Classic	L 61–69	6–12 (2–3)	15 – Hicks	6 – Hicks	2 – Hicks	Mitchell Center; Mobile, AL
January 21, 2023; 5:00 pm		Texas Southern	L 59–70	6–13 (2–4)	11 – Peek	5 – Hicks	2 – Tucker	Alabama A&M Events Center (1,954); Huntsville, AL
January 23, 2023; 7:00 pm, HBCU Go		Prairie View A&M	W 67–59	7–13 (3–4)	13 – Blaise Akonobi	11 – Blaise Akonobi	4 – Thompson	Alabama A&M Events Center (2,787); Huntsville, AL
January 28, 2023; 3:00 pm		at Florida A&M	W 61–56	8–13 (4–4)	17 – Blaise Akonobi	6 – Blaise Akonobi	4 – Thompson	Al Lawson Center (1,724); Tallahassee, FL
January 30, 2023; 6:30 pm		at Bethune–Cookman	L 77–88	8–14 (4–5)	22 – Hicks	10 – Blaise Akonobi	3 – Tucker	Moore Gymnasium (631); Daytona Beach, FL
February 4, 2023; 5:00 pm		Southern	W 82–61	9–14 (5–5)	20 – Thompson	5 – Lee	5 – Hicks	Alabama A&M Events Center (3,313); Huntsville, AL
February 6, 2023; 7:00 pm		Grambling State	L 60–66	9–15 (5–6)	17 – Tucker	4 – Tied	5 – Tucker	Alabama A&M Events Center (872); Huntsville, AL
February 11, 2023; 7:00 pm		at Mississippi Valley State	W 70–68 ^{2OT}	10–15 (6–6)	20 – Smith	5 – Tied	3 – Thompson	Harrison HPER Complex (976); Itta Bena, MS
February 13, 2023; 7:00 pm		at Arkansas–Pine Bluff	W 75–72	11–15 (7–6)	24 – Thompson	6 – Tied	5 – Tied	H.O. Clemmons Arena (1,621); Pine Bluff, AR
February 18, 2023; 5:00 pm		Bethune–Cookman	W 90–56	12–15 (8–6)	14 – Tucker	7 – Williams	6 – Thompson	Alabama A&M Events Center (2,500); Huntsville, AL
February 20, 2023; 7:00 pm		Florida A&M	L 71–77	12–16 (8–7)	13 – Blaise Akonobi	10 – Blaise Akonobi	4 – Thompson	Alabama A&M Events Center (3,277); Huntsville, AL
February 25, 2023; 4:00 pm		at Alabama State	W 55–50	13–16 (9–7)	17 – Thompson	7 – Hicks	3 – Williams	Dunn–Oliver Acadome (1,207); Montgomery, AL
March 2, 2023; 7:00 pm		at Grambling State	L 48–60	13–17 (9–8)	16 – Blaise Akonobi	6 – Blaise Akonobi	2 – Downey	Fredrick C. Hobdy Assembly Center (1,232); Grambling, LA
March 4, 2023; 5:30 pm		at Southern	W 68–65	14–17 (10–8)	16 – Tied	8 – Blaise Akonobi	4 – Tied	F. G. Clark Center (5,522); Baton Rouge, LA
SWAC tournament
March 9, 2023; 8:30 pm, ESPN+	(5)	vs. (4) Southern; Quarterfinals	W 77–63	15–17	27 – Thompson	9 – Blaise Akonobi	3 – Thompson	Bartow Arena (1,067); Birmingham, AL
March 10, 2023; 2:00 pm, ESPN+	(5)	vs. (8) Texas Southern; Semifinals	L 61–74	15–18	15 – Downey	8 – Harvell	3 – Tied	Bartow Arena (645); Birmingham, AL
*Non-conference game. ^{#}Rankings from AP Poll. (#) Tournament seedings in parentheses. All times are in Central.
