= 2022–23 UNLV Runnin' Rebels basketball team =

Sports team

2022–23 UNLV Runnin' Rebels basketball

SoCal Challenge Surf Division Champions
- Conference: Mountain West Conference
- Record: 19–13 (7–11 MW)
- Head coach: Kevin Kruger (2nd season)
- Assistant coaches: Barret Peery; John Cooper; Jamaal Williams
- Home arena: Thomas & Mack Center

2022–23 Mountain West Conference men's basketball standings
	Conf.				Overall
Team	W		L	PCT	W		L	PCT
No. 18 San Diego State †	15	–	3	.833	32	–	7	.821
Boise State	13	–	5	.722	24	–	10	.706
Utah State	13	–	5	.722	26	–	9	.743
Nevada	12	–	6	.667	22	–	11	.667
San Jose State	10	–	8	.556	21	–	14	.600
New Mexico	8	–	10	.444	22	–	12	.647
UNLV	7	–	11	.389	19	–	13	.594
Colorado State	6	–	12	.333	15	–	18	.455
Fresno State	6	–	12	.333	11	–	20	.355
Air Force	5	–	13	.278	14	–	18	.438
Wyoming	4	–	14	.222	9	–	22	.290
† Conference tournament winner Rankings from AP poll

The 2022–23 UNLV Runnin' Rebels basketball team represented the University of Nevada, Las Vegas during the 2022–23 NCAA Division I men's basketball season. The Runnin' Rebels were led by second-year head coach Kevin Kruger and played their home games for the 40th season at the Thomas & Mack Center in Paradise, Nevada. They participated as members of the Mountain West Conference for the 24th season. They finished the season 18–12, 7–11 in MWC play to finish in seventh place. In the MWC tournament, they defeated Air Force in the first round before losing to Boise State in the quarterfinals. They failed to receive an invite to a postseason tournament.

== Previous season ==
The Runnin' Rebels finished the 2021–22 season 18–14, 10–8 in Mountain West play to finish in 5th place.

They were defeated by Wyoming in the first round of the Mountain West tournament to end the season.

Following the departure of coach T.J. Otzelberger to Iowa State, the roster saw a significant amount of turnover from the 2020-21 season. Only 3 players - Bryce Hamilton, Reece Brown and Trey Hurlburt - returned from the prior season.

== Offseason ==
=== Departures ===
Name	Number	Pos.	Height	Weight	Year	Hometown	Reason for departure
Michael Nuga	1	G	6'2"	180	GS Senior	Toronto, ON	Completed college eligibility
Donovan Williams	3	G	6'6"	190	Junior	Houston, TX	Declared for 2022 NBA draft
Bryce Hamilton	13	G	6'4"	205	Senior	Pasadena, CA	Declared for 2022 NBA draft
Royce Hamm Jr.	14	F	6'9"	225	GS Senior	Houston, TX	Completed college eligibility
Reece Brown	15	F	6'9"	200	RS Sophomore	Albany, NY	Entered transfer portal
Josh Baker	22	G	6'4"	175	Junior	Tempe, AZ	Entered transfer portal
Trey Hurlburt	24	G	5'11''	175	Senior	Las Vegas, NV	Graduated
James Hampshire	30	C	7'1"	240	GS Senior	Flagstaff, AZ	Graduated
Marvin Coleman	31	G	6'3"	200	Senior	Las Vegas, NV	Graduated

=== Incoming transfers ===
Name	Number	Pos.	Height	Weight	Year	Hometown	Previous School
Elijah Parquet	1	G	6'4"	195	GS Senior	Beaumont, TX	Transferred from Colorado. Will be eligible to play immediately since Parquet graduated from Colorado.
Shane Nowell	3	G	6'6''	215	Sophomore	Seattle, WA	Transferred from Arizona. Nowell will be eligible to play immediately under the one-time transfer rule.
Isaiah Cottrell	13	F	6'10''	245	RS Sophomore	Las Vegas, NV	Transferred from West Virginia. Cottrell will be eligible to play immediately under the one-time transfer rule.
Luis Rodriguez	15	G	6'6"	210	Senior	Los Angeles, CA	Transferred from Ole Miss. Rodriguez will be eligible to play immediately under the one-time transfer rule.
Karl Jones	22	F	6'10''	250	Junior	Chicago, IL	Transferred from Los Angeles Southwest College. Jones will be eligible to play immediately under the one-time transfer rule.
Jackie Johnson III	24	G	5'11"	185	Sophomore	Wichita, KS	Transferred from Duquesne. Johnson III will be eligible to play immediately under the one-time transfer rule.
Cameron Burist	34	G	6'3''	185	Senior	Las Vegas, NV	Transferred from Mesa Community College. Burist will be eligible to play immediately under the one-time transfer rule.
Elijah Harkless	55	G	6’3”	195	GS Senior	San Bernardino, CA	Transferred from Oklahoma. Will be eligible to play immediately since Harkless graduated from Oklahoma.

=== 2022 recruiting class ===
College recruiting information
Name	Hometown	School	Height	Weight	Commit date
Keyshawn Hall; SG	Cleveland, OH	Denver Prep	6 ft 7 in (2.01 m)	250 lb (110 kg)	Feb 6, 2022
Keyshawn Hall; SG	Recruit ratings: Scout: Rivals: 247Sports: ESPN: (NR)				
Overall recruit ranking:
Note: In many cases, Scout, Rivals, 247Sports, On3, and ESPN may conflict in their listings of height and weight.; In these cases, the average was taken. ESPN grades are on a 100-point scale.; Sources: "2022 UNLV Basketball Commitments". Rivals.; "2022 Team Ranking". Rivals.

== Roster ==
2022–23 UNLV Runnin' Rebels men's basketball team
Players
Coaches

Pos.	#	Name	Height	Weight	Year	Previous school	Hometown
F	0	Victor Iwuakor	6 ft 7 in (2.01 m)	225 lb (102 kg)	Sr	Oklahoma	Abuja, Nigeria
G	1	Elijah Parquet	6 ft 4 in (1.93 m)	195 lb (88 kg)	GS	Colorado	Beaumont, TX
G	2	Justin Webster	6 ft 3 in (1.91 m)	185 lb (84 kg)	Sr	Hawaii	Dallas, TX
G	3	Shane Nowell	6 ft 6 in (1.98 m)	215 lb (98 kg)	So	Arizona	Seattle, WA
G	5	Jordan McCabe	6 ft 0 in (1.83 m)	190 lb (86 kg)	GS	West Virginia	Kaukauna, WI
G	10	Keshon Gilbert	6 ft 4 in (1.93 m)	190 lb (86 kg)	So	Vashon HS	Las Vegas, NV
C	12	David Muoka	6 ft 10 in (2.08 m)	235 lb (107 kg)	Sr	Lamar	Hong Kong
F	13	Isaiah Cottrell	6 ft 10 in (2.08 m)	245 lb (111 kg)	RS So	West Virginia	Las Vegas, NV
G	14	Keyshawn Hall	6 ft 7 in (2.01 m)	250 lb (113 kg)	Fr	Denver Prep	Cleveland, OH
G	15	Luis Rodriguez	6 ft 6 in (1.98 m)	210 lb (95 kg)	Sr	Ole Miss	Los Angeles, CA
F	22	Karl Jones	6 ft 10 in (2.08 m)	250 lb (113 kg)	Jr	LA Southwest College	Chicago, IL
G	24	Jackie Johnson III	5 ft 11 in (1.8 m)	185 lb (84 kg)	So	Duquesne	Wichita, KS
G	34	Cameron Burist	6 ft 3 in (1.91 m)	185 lb (84 kg)	Sr	Mesa CC	Las Vegas, NV
G	55	Elijah Harkless	6 ft 3 in (1.91 m)	195 lb (88 kg)	GS	Oklahoma	San Bernardino, CA

Head coach

- Kevin Kruger (UNLV)

Assistant coach(es)

- Barret Peery (Southern Utah)
- John Cooper (Wichita State)
- Jamaal Williams (Washington)

Legend

- (C) Team captain
- (S) Suspended
- (I) Ineligible
- (W) Walk-on
- Injured
- Current redshirt

Roster

== Schedule and results ==
Date time, TV	Rank^{#}	Opponent^{#}	Result	Record	High points	High rebounds	High assists	Site (attendance) city, state
Non-conference regular season
Nov. 7, 2022*; 7:15 p.m., MW Network/SSSEN		Southern	W 66–56	1–0	13 – Gilbert	7 – Rodriguez	3 – Tied	Thomas & Mack Center (5,039); Paradise, NV
Nov. 12, 2022*; 3:00 p.m., MW Network/SSSEN		Incarnate Word	W 88–63	2–0	23 – Gilbert	9 – Iwuakor	5 – Rodriguez	Thomas & Mack Center (4,931); Paradise, NV
Nov. 15, 2022*; 8:00 p.m., CBSSN		No. 21 Dayton	W 60–52	3–0	24 – Harkless	9 – Muoka	3 – Tied	Thomas & Mack Center (5,732); Paradise, NV
Nov. 18, 2022*; 7:00 p.m., MW Network/SSSEN		High Point; SoCal Challenge campus-site game	W 78–68	4–0	15 – Harkless	10 – Rodriguez	8 – Gilbert	Thomas & Mack Center (4,589); Paradise, NV
Nov. 21, 2022*; 10:00 p.m., CBSSN		vs. Southern Illinois; SoCal Challenge Semifinals	W 56–49	5–0	18 – Gilbert	6 – Iwuakor	2 – Rodriguez	The Pavilion at JSerra; San Juan Capistrano, CA
Nov. 23, 2022*; 7:30 p.m., CBSSN		vs. Minnesota; SoCal Challenge Championship	W 71–62	6–0	17 – Gilbert	9 – Rodriguez	4 – Gilbert	The Pavilion at JSerra; San Juan Capistrano, CA
Nov. 26, 2022*; 7:30 p.m., MW Network		Life Pacific	W 126–54	7–0	20 – Jones	12 – Jones	8 – McCabe	Thomas & Mack Center (4,549); Paradise, NV
Dec. 3, 2022*; 7:00 p.m., WCC Network		at San Diego	W 95–78	8–0	19 – Rodriguez	8 – Muoka	7 – Gilbert	Jenny Craig Pavilion (1,274); San Diego, CA
Dec. 7, 2022*; 7:00 p.m., YouTube		vs. Hawaii	W 77–62	9–0	18 – Rodriguez	9 – Muoka	4 – Gilbert	Dollar Loan Center (4,207); Henderson, NV
Dec. 10, 2022*; 1:30 p.m., FS1		vs. Washington State; Las Vegas Clash	W 74–70	10–0	25 – Gilbert	5 – Gilbert	4 – Rodriguez	MGM Grand Garden Arena (-); Paradise, NV
Dec. 17, 2022*; 2:00 p.m., MW Network/SSSEN		San Francisco	L 73–75	10–1	21 – Harkless	7 – Tied	6 – Gilbert	Thomas & Mack Center (6,446); Paradise, NV
Dec. 22, 2022*; 7:00 p.m., MW Network/SSSEN		Southern Miss	W 74–63	11–1	19 – Harkless	10 – Gilbert	6 – Harkless	Thomas & Mack Center (6,093); Paradise, NV
Mountain West regular season
Dec. 28, 2022; 7:00 p.m., MW Network		at San José State	L 72–75 ^{OT}	11–2 (0–1)	20 – Harkless	8 – Rodriguez	3 – Tied	Provident Credit Union Event Center (2,234); San Jose, CA
Dec. 31, 2022; 1:00 p.m., CBS		San Diego State	L 67–76	11–3 (0–2)	24 – Rodriguez	6 – Tied	8 – Harkless	Thomas & Mack Center (7,249); Paradise, NV
Jan. 7, 2023; 6:30 p.m., CBSSN		at No. 21 New Mexico	W 84–77	12–3 (1–2)	25 – Harkless	7 – Muoka	5 – Tied	The Pit (15,424); Albuquerque, NM
Jan. 11, 2023; 8:00 p.m., CBSSN		Boise State	L 66–84	12–4 (1–3)	14 – Gilbert	7 – Tied	4 – Gilbert	Thomas & Mack Center (5,102); Paradise, NV
Jan. 14, 2023; 4:00 p.m., CBSSN		Colorado State	L 81–82 ^{OT}	12–5 (1–4)	33 – Harkless	9 – Tied	4 – Gilbert	Thomas & Mack Center (5,802); Paradise, NV
Jan. 17, 2023; 6:00 p.m., MW Network		at Utah State	L 71–75	12–6 (1–5)	19 – Hall	6 – Rodriguez	5 – Gilbert	Smith Spectrum (7,611); Logan, UT
Jan. 21, 2023; 3:00 p.m., CBSSN		at Fresno State	L 63–76	12–7 (1–6)	15 – Harkless	7 – Harkless	4 – Harkless	Save Mart Center (5,950); Fresno, CA
Jan. 24, 2023; 8:00 p.m., CBSSN		Wyoming	W 86–72	13–7 (2–6)	28 – Harkless	8 – Tied	4 – McCabe	Thomas & Mack Center (4,539); Paradise, NV
Jan. 28, 2023; 7:00 p.m., CBSSN		Nevada; Battle for Nevada	W 68–62	14–7 (3–6)	18 – Harkless	9 – Harkless	5 – Harkless	Thomas & Mack Center (8,734); Paradise, NV
Jan. 31, 2023; 6:00 p.m.		at Colorado State	W 83–71	15–7 (4–6)	17 – Harkless	6 – Rodriguez	5 – Harkless	Moby Arena (4,657); Fort Collins, CO
Feb. 3, 2023; 8:00 p.m., FS1		Fresno State	L 79–82	15–8 (4–7)	27 – Harkless	7 – Iwuakor	4 – Harkless	Thomas & Mack Center (5,762); Paradise, NV
Feb. 8, 2023; 7:30 p.m., FS1		at Wyoming	W 69–59	16–8 (5–7)	33 – Harkless	8 – Harkless	3 – Gilbert	Arena-Auditorium (3,717); Laramie, WY
Feb. 11, 2023; 1:00 p.m., FOX		at No. 25 San Diego State	L 71–82	16–9 (5–8)	24 – Harkless	4 – Rodriguez	3 – Tied	Viejas Arena (12,414); San Diego, CA
Feb. 14, 2023; 7:00 p.m., MW Network/SSSEN		San José State	L 66–75	16–10 (5–9)	19 – Harkless	7 – Tied	3 – Gilbert	Thomas & Mack Center (4,783); Paradise, NV
Feb. 19, 2023; 6:00 p.m., FS1		at Boise State	L 69–73	16–11 (5–10)	14 – Tied	6 – Iwuakor	3 – Tied	ExtraMile Arena (11,004); Boise, ID
Feb. 24, 2023; 6:30 p.m., CBSSN		Air Force	W 54–53	17–11 (6–10)	23 – Harkless	7 – Harkless	3 – McCabe	Thomas & Mack Center (5,831); Paradise, NV
Mar. 1, 2023; 8:00 p.m., CBSSN		Utah State	L 66–91	17–12 (6–11)	20 – Harkless	9 – Nowell	2 – Tied	Thomas & Mack Center (5,747); Paradise, NV
Mar. 4, 2023; 2:00 p.m.		at Nevada; Battle for Nevada	W 69–67 ^{OT}	18–12 (7–11)	24 – Harkless	13 – Tied	4 – Harkless	Lawlor Events Center (11,327); Reno, NV
Mountain West tournament
March 8, 2023; 1:30 pm, Stadium	(7)	vs. (10) Air Force; First round	W 78–70 ^{OT}	19–12	35 – Harkless	11 – Rodriguez	4 – 2 tied	Thomas & Mack Center; Paradise, NV
March 9, 2023; 6:00 pm, CBSSN	(7)	vs. (2) Boise State; Quarterfinals	L 76–87 ^{OT}	19–13	18 – 2 Tied	8 – Muoka	7 – Harkless	Thomas & Mack Center; Paradise, NV
*Non-conference game. ^{#}Rankings from AP Poll. (#) Tournament seedings in parentheses. All times are in Pacific Time.
