= 2023 SWAC men's basketball tournament =

American collegiate tournament

- Classification: Division I
- Season: 2022–23
- Teams: 8
- Site: Bartow Arena; Birmingham, Alabama
- Champions: Texas Southern (11th title)
- Winning coach: Johnny Jones (3rd title)
- Television: ESPN+, ESPNU

The 2023 SWAC Men's Basketball Tournament was the postseason men's basketball tournament for the 2022–23 season in the Southwestern Athletic Conference (SWAC). The tournament was held from March 8–11, 2023. The tournament winner, Texas Southern, for the third straight season, received an automatic invitation to the 2023 NCAA Division I Men's Basketball Tournament, the latter becoming just the third 20-loss team to make the tournament. The tournament was sponsored by Cricket Wireless.

2022–23 SWAC men's basketball standings
	Conf.				Overall
Team	W		L	PCT	W		L	PCT
Alcorn State	15	–	3	.833	18	–	14	.563
Grambling State	15	–	3	.833	24	–	9	.727
Jackson State	12	–	6	.667	14	–	19	.424
Southern	11	–	7	.611	15	–	17	.469
Alabama A&M	10	–	8	.556	15	–	18	.455
Prairie View A&M	9	–	9	.500	13	–	19	.406
Bethune–Cookman	8	–	10	.444	12	–	20	.375
Texas Southern †	7	–	11	.389	14	–	21	.400
Alabama State	6	–	12	.333	8	–	23	.258
Arkansas–Pine Bluff	6	–	12	.333	10	–	21	.323
Florida A&M	5	–	13	.278	7	–	22	.241
Mississippi Valley State	4	–	14	.222	5	–	27	.156
† 2023 SWAC tournament winner

== Seeds ==
Teams were seeded by record within the conference, with a tie–breaker system that seeded teams with identical conference records. Only the top eight teams in the conference qualified for the tournament.

Seed	School	Conference	Tiebreaker
1	Alcorn State	15–3	1–0 vs Grambling State
2	Grambling State	15–3	0–1 vs Alcorn State
3	Jackson State	12–6	
4	Southern	11–7	
5	Alabama A&M	10–8	
6	Prairie View A&M	9–9	
7	Bethune–Cookman	8–10	
8	Texas Southern	7–11	
DNQ	Alabama State	6–12	2–0 vs AR-Pine Bluff
DNQ	Arkansas–Pine Bluff	6–12	0–2 vs Alabama State
DNQ	Florida A&M	5–13	
DNQ	Mississippi Valley State	4–14	

== Schedule ==
Game	Time*	Matchup^{#}	Score	Television
Quarterfinals – Wednesday, March 8, 2023
1	2:00 p.m.	No. 2 Grambling State vs. No. 7 Bethune–Cookman	87–72	ESPN+
2	8:30 p.m.	No. 1 Alcorn State vs. No. 8 Texas Southern	62–66	ESPN+
Quarterfinals – Thursday, March 9, 2023
3	2:00 p.m.	No. 3 Jackson State vs. No. 6 Prairie View A&M	62–60^{OT}	ESPN+
4	8:30 p.m.	No. 4 Southern vs. No. 5 Alabama A&M	63–77	ESPN+
Semifinals – Friday, March 10, 2023
5	2:00 p.m.	No. 5 Alabama A&M vs. No. 8 Texas Southern	61–74	ESPN+
6	8:30 p.m.	No. 2 Grambling State vs. No. 3 Jackson State	78–69	ESPN+
Championship – Saturday, March 11, 2023
7	4:30 p.m.	No. 8 Texas Southern vs. No. 2 Grambling State	61–58	ESPNU
*Game times in CST. #-Rankings denote tournament seeding.

== Bracket ==
Quarterfinals; March 8–9
1	Alcorn State	62
8	Texas Southern	66
4	Southern	63
5	Alabama A&M	77
2	Grambling State	87
7	Bethune-Cookman	72
3	Jackson State	62*
6	Prairie View A&M	60

Semifinals; March 10
8	Texas Southern	74
5	Alabama A&M	61
2	Grambling State	78
3	Jackson State	69

Championship; March 11
8	Texas Southern	61
2	Grambling State	58

* Denotes overtime period
