= 2022–23 Southern Jaguars basketball team =

American college basketball season

2022–23 Southern Jaguars basketball
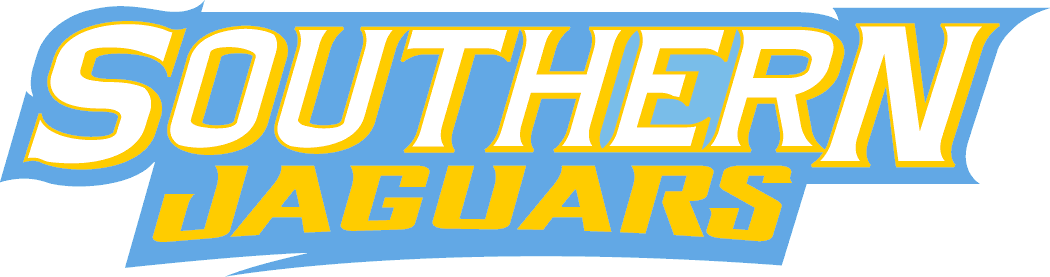
- Conference: Southwestern Athletic Conference
- Record: 15–17 (11–7 SWAC)
- Head coach: Sean Woods (5th season)
- Assistant coaches: Ryan Price; Dylan Howard; Jethro Hillman
- Home arena: F. G. Clark Center

2022–23 SWAC men's basketball standings
	Conf.				Overall
Team	W		L	PCT	W		L	PCT
Alcorn State	15	–	3	.833	18	–	14	.563
Grambling State	15	–	3	.833	24	–	9	.727
Jackson State	12	–	6	.667	14	–	19	.424
Southern	11	–	7	.611	15	–	17	.469
Alabama A&M	10	–	8	.556	15	–	18	.455
Prairie View A&M	9	–	9	.500	13	–	19	.406
Bethune–Cookman	8	–	10	.444	12	–	20	.375
Texas Southern †	7	–	11	.389	14	–	21	.400
Alabama State	6	–	12	.333	8	–	23	.258
Arkansas–Pine Bluff	6	–	12	.333	10	–	21	.323
Florida A&M	5	–	13	.278	7	–	22	.241
Mississippi Valley State	4	–	14	.222	5	–	27	.156
† 2023 SWAC tournament winner

The 2022–23 Southern Jaguars basketball team represented Southern University in the 2022–23 NCAA Division I men's basketball season. The Jaguars, led by fifth-year head coach Sean Woods, played their home games at the F. G. Clark Center in Baton Rouge, Louisiana as members of the Southwestern Athletic Conference.

== Previous season ==
The Jaguars finished the 2021–22 season 17–14, 12–6 in SWAC play to finish third place. As the No. 3 seed, they lost to No. 6 seed Grambling State. They did not receive a bid to any post season tournaments, ending their season with a 17–14 record.

== Roster ==
2022–23 Southern Jaguars men's basketball team
Players
Coaches

Pos.	#	Name	Height	Weight	Year	Hometown
F	0	Terrell Williams, Jr	6 ft 6 in (1.98 m)	200 lb (91 kg)	RS Jr	Arlington, Texas
F	1	JaRonn Wilkens	6 ft 9 in (2.06 m)	190 lb (86 kg)	Jr	Biloxi, Mississippi
F	2	J'Quan Ewing	6 ft 9 in (2.06 m)	195 lb (88 kg)	Fr	Clarksville, Tennessee
G	3	P.J. Byrd	6 ft 1 in (1.85 m)	175 lb (79 kg)	Sr	Houston, Texas
G	4	Isaiah Rollins	6 ft 3 in (1.91 m)	185 lb (84 kg)	Sr	Opelousas, Louisiana
F	5	Jariyon Wilkens	6 ft 7 in (2.01 m)	185 lb (84 kg)	Jr	Biloxi, Mississippi
G	11	DeSean Woods	6 ft 0 in (1.83 m)	165 lb (75 kg)	Jr	Lexington, Kentucky
F	12	Jalen Reynolds	6 ft 6 in (1.98 m)	245 lb (111 kg)	RS Jr	Darien, Georgia
G	13	Dre'Shawn Allen	6 ft 1 in (1.85 m)	170 lb (77 kg)	Sr	Auburn Hills, Michigan
G	14	Kris Gardner	6 ft 1 in (1.85 m)	170 lb (77 kg)	Sr	Albany, Georgia
G	20	Gavin Harris	6 ft 2 in (1.88 m)	155 lb (70 kg)	RS So	Gonzales, Louisiana
F	21	Festus Ndumanya	6 ft 7 in (2.01 m)	225 lb (102 kg)	RS Jr	Anambra, Nigeria
G	22	Brion Whitley	6 ft 4 in (1.93 m)	200 lb (91 kg)	RS Sr	Sarasota, Florida
G	23	Bryson Etienne	6 ft 3 in (1.91 m)	190 lb (86 kg)	RS Sr	Houston, Texas
F	33	Gavin Flowers	6 ft 7 in (2.01 m)	200 lb (91 kg)	So	East Orange, New Jersey
G/F	35	Tyrone Lyons	6 ft 7 in (2.01 m)	190 lb (86 kg)	RS Sr	North Amityville, New York

Head coach

- Sean Woods (Kentucky)

Assistant coach(es)

- Ryan Price (Henderson State)
- Dylan Howard (UAB)
- Jethro Hillman (Miami (FL))

Legend

- (C) Team captain
- (S) Suspended
- (I) Ineligible
- (W) Walk-on
- Injured
- Current redshirt

Roster
Last update: November 8, 2022

== Schedule and results ==
Date time, TV	Rank^{#}	Opponent^{#}	Result	Record	High points	High rebounds	High assists	Site (attendance) city, state
Exhibition
November 3, 2022*; 6:30 pm		Tougaloo	W 91–44	–	16 – Etienne	7 – Ndumanya	5 – Byrd	F. G. Clark Center (568); Baton Rouge, LA
Non-conference regular season
November 7, 2022*; 9:15 pm, MWN		at UNLV	L 56–66	0–1	25 – Etienne	7 – Reynolds	6 – Byrd	Thomas & Mack Center (5,039); Paradise, NV
November 11, 2022*; 9:00 pm, P12N		at No. 17 Arizona; Pac-12/SWAC Legacy Series	L 78–95	0–2	17 – Etienne	5 – Tied	4 – Etienne	McKale Center (13,485); Tucson, AZ
November 16, 2022*; 7:30 pm, WCC Network		at Saint Mary's	L 54–72	0–3	15 – Whitley	4 – Tied	4 – Byrd	University Credit Union Pavilion (2,643); Moraga, CA
November 18, 2022*; 8:00 pm, P12N		at California; Emerald Coast Classic Campus site game	W 74–66	1–3	18 – Whitley	4 – Tied	9 – Byrd	Haas Pavilion (1,364); Berkeley, CA
November 25, 2022*; 11:00 am, FloHoops		vs. Loyola (MD); Emerald Coast Classic second round	W 76–58	2–3	18 – Byrd	5 – Byrd	4 – Byrd	The Arena at NFSC (125); Niceville, FL
November 26, 2022*; 12:30 pm, FloHoops		vs. Omaha; Emerald Coast Classic championship round	L 78–88	2–4	23 – Whitley	5 – Tied	7 – Byrd	The Arena at NFSC (150); Niceville, FL
November 28, 2022*; 6:30 pm, Jaguar Sports Network		Champion Christian	W 112–52	3–4	16 – Ewing	8 – Wilkens	5 – Woods	F. G. Clark Center (2,126); Baton Rouge, LA
December 2, 2022*; 6:00 pm, ESPN+		at Louisiana Tech	L 59–74	3–5	16 – Whitley	9 – Lyons	3 – Tied	Thomas Assembly Center (2,649); Ruston, LA
December 10, 2022*; 4:00 pm, Jaguar Sports Network		LSU–Alexandria	W 98–76	4–5	27 – Whitley	10 – Williams Jr.	7 – Byrd	F. G. Clark Center (1,155); Baton Rouge, LA
December 13, 2023*; 6:00 pm, FS1		at Xavier	L 59–79	4–6	17 – Whitley	5 – Byrd	7 – Byrd	Cintas Center (10,029); Cincinnati, OH
December 16, 2022*; 7:00 pm, ESPN+		at Youngstown State	L 81–85	4–7	16 – Tied	6 – Lyons	12 – Byrd	Beeghly Center (2,544); Youngstown, OH
December 18, 2022*; 3:30 pm, CBSSN		at UAB	L 66–92	4–8	12 – Williams Jr.	6 – Whitley	3 – Byrd	Bartow Arena (3,631); Birmingham, AL
December 21, 2022*; 7:00 pm, ESPN+		at Southeastern Louisiana	L 62–80	4–9	14 – Etienne	4 – Lyons	7 – Etienne	University Center (515); Hammond, LA
SWAC regular season
January 2, 2023; 8:00 pm, Jaguar Sports Network		at Texas Southern	W 77–76 ^{OT}	5–9 (1–0)	18 – Etienne	8 – Whitley	9 – Byrd	H&PE Arena (2,741); Houston, TX
January 4, 2023; 8:00 pm, Jaguar Sports Network		at Prairie View A&M	W 66–62	6–9 (2–0)	17 – Williams Jr.	8 – Williams Jr.	6 – Byrd	William Nicks Building (570); Prairie View, TX
January 7, 2023; 5:30 pm, Jaguar Sports Network		Florida A&M	W 84–66	7–9 (3–0)	19 – Lyons	5 – Reynolds	14 – Byrd	F. G. Clark Center (3,157); Baton Rouge, LA
January 9, 2023; 8:00 pm, Jaguar Sports Network		Bethune–Cookman	W 102–75	8–9 (4–0)	24 – Rollins	8 – Lyons	7 – Etienne	F. G. Clark Center (3,932); Baton Rouge, LA
January 14, 2023; 5:30 pm, Jaguar Sports Network		Grambling State	W 81–73	9–9 (5–0)	32 – Whitley	9 – Lyons	8 – Byrd	F. G. Clark Center (6,327); Baton Rouge, LA
January 21, 2023; 7:30 pm, Jaguar Sports Network		at Arkansas–Pine Bluff	L 55–62	9–10 (5–1)	12 – Woods	6 – Lyons	5 – Bryrd	H. O. Clemmons Arena (1,351); Pine Bluff, AR
January 23, 2023; 8:00 pm, Jaguar Sports Network		at Mississippi Valley State	W 84–70	10–10 (6–1)	18 – Whitley	10 – Ndumanya	3 – Williams Jr.	Harrison HPER Complex (1,409); Itta Bena, MS
January 28, 2023; 5:30 pm, Jaguar Sports Network		Alcorn State	W 80–68	11–10 (7–1)	27 – Whitley	7 – Ndumanya	6 – Byrd	Davey Whitney Complex (5,978); Lorman, MS
January 30, 2023; 8:00 pm, ESPNU		Jackson State	W 73–62	12–10 (8–1)	18 – Etienne	7 – Ndumanya	8 – Byrd	Williams Assembly Center (7,489); Jackson, MS
February 4, 2023; 4:00 pm, HBCUGo		at Alabama A&M	L 61–82	12–11 (8–2)	16 – Etienne	4 – Byrd	4 – Byrd	Alabama A&M Events Center (3,313); Normal, AL
February 6, 2023; 8:00 pm, HBCUGo		at Alabama State	L 66–71	12–12 (8–3)	17 – Reynolds	8 – Whitley	3 – Etienne	Dunn–Oliver Acadome (1,242); Montgomery, AL
February 11, 2023; 5:30 pm, Jaguar Sports Network		Prairie View A&M	W 79–65	13–12 (9–3)	18 – Whitley	10 – Williams Jr.	4 – Byrd	F. G. Clark Center (5,199); Baton Rouge, LA
February 13, 2023; 8:30 pm, HBCUGo		Texas Southern	L 68–79	13–13 (9–4)	11 – Etienne	8 – Williams Jr.	5 – Woods	F. G. Clark Center (4,458); Baton Rouge, LA
February 18, 2023; 3:00 pm, ESPN2/TNT/NBA TV		vs. Grambling State; NBA HBCU Classic	L 64–69 ^{OT}	13–14 (9–5)	13 – Whitley	9 – Ndumanya	6 – Byrd	Jon M. Huntsman Center (6,246); Salt Lake City, UT
February 25, 2023; 3:30 pm, HBCUGo		at Bethune-Cookman University	L 53–60	13–15 (9–6)	16 – Byrd	10 – Williams Jr.	3 – Byrd	Moore Gymnasium (961); Daytona Beach, FL
February 27, 2023; 3:30 pm, Facebook		at Florida A&M	W 60–58	14–15 (10–6)	18 – Byrd	8 – Williams	3 – Byrd	Al Lawson Center; Tallahassee, FL
March 2, 2023; 8:00 pm, Jaguar Sports Network		Alabama State	W 66–52	15–15 (11–6)	16 – Etienne	7 – Tied	7 – Byrd	F. G. Clark Center (4,389); Baton Rouge, LA
March 4, 2023; 5:30 pm, Jaguar Sports Network		Alabama A&M	L 65–68	15–16 (11–7)	17 – Whitley	7 – Etienne	8 – Byrd	F. G. Clark Center (5,522); Baton Rouge, LA
SWAC tournament
March 9, 2022; 8:30 pm, ESPN+	(4)	vs. (5) Alabama A&M; Quarterfinals	L 63–77	15–17	18 – Whitley	5 – Tied	3 – Woods	Bartow Arena (1,067); Birmingham, AL
*Non-conference game. ^{#}Rankings from AP Poll. (#) Tournament seedings in parentheses. All times are in Central.
