= 2022–23 Grambling State Tigers men's basketball team =

American college basketball season

2022–23 Grambling State Tigers men's basketball

SWAC regular-season co-champions
- Conference: Southwestern Athletic Conference
- Record: 24–9 (15–3 SWAC)
- Head coach: Donte Jackson (6th season)
- Assistant coaches: Kyle Jones; Eshaunte Jones; Devarus Walker
- Home arena: Fredrick C. Hobdy Assembly Center

2022–23 SWAC men's basketball standings
	Conf.				Overall
Team	W		L	PCT	W		L	PCT
Alcorn State	15	–	3	.833	18	–	14	.563
Grambling State	15	–	3	.833	24	–	9	.727
Jackson State	12	–	6	.667	14	–	19	.424
Southern	11	–	7	.611	15	–	17	.469
Alabama A&M	10	–	8	.556	15	–	18	.455
Prairie View A&M	9	–	9	.500	13	–	19	.406
Bethune–Cookman	8	–	10	.444	12	–	20	.375
Texas Southern †	7	–	11	.389	14	–	21	.400
Alabama State	6	–	12	.333	8	–	23	.258
Arkansas–Pine Bluff	6	–	12	.333	10	–	21	.323
Florida A&M	5	–	13	.278	7	–	22	.241
Mississippi Valley State	4	–	14	.222	5	–	27	.156
† 2023 SWAC tournament winner

The 2022–23 Grambling State Tigers men's basketball team represented Grambling State University in the 2022–23 NCAA Division I men's basketball season. The Tigers, led by sixth-year head coach Donte Jackson, played their home games at the Fredrick C. Hobdy Assembly Center in Grambling, Louisiana as members of the Southwestern Athletic Conference (SWAC).

== Previous season ==
The Tigers finished the 2021–22 season 12–20, 9–9 in SWAC play, to finish in a tie for sixth place. In the SWAC tournament, they defeated Southern in the quarterfinals before losing to second-seeded Texas Southern in the semifinals.

== Roster ==
2022–23 Grambling State Tigers men's basketball team
Players
Coaches

Pos.	#	Name	Height	Weight	Year	Hometown
G	00	Virshon Cotton	6 ft 2 in (1.88 m)	170 lb (77 kg)	GS	Milwaukee, WI
G	1	Cameron Christon	6 ft 6 in (1.98 m)	190 lb (86 kg)	GS	Allen, TX
G	2	Zahad Munford	6 ft 3 in (1.91 m)	170 lb (77 kg)	Sr	Dallas, TX
G	3	Justin Warren	6 ft 0 in (1.83 m)	165 lb (75 kg)	So	Chicago, IL
F	4	Carte'are Gordon	6 ft 9 in (2.06 m)	235 lb (107 kg)	RS Jr	St. Louis, MO
G	5	Tra'Michael Moton	6 ft 1 in (1.85 m)	170 lb (77 kg)	Sr	Shreveport, LA
G	10	Shawndarius Cowart	6 ft 3 in (1.91 m)	180 lb (82 kg)	Sr	Pensacola, FL
G/F	11	Jourdan Smith	6 ft 7 in (2.01 m)	180 lb (82 kg)	Jr	New Orleans, LA
F	12	Jonathan Aku	6 ft 11 in (2.11 m)	255 lb (116 kg)	Jr	Kaduna, Nigeria
F	22	Joshua Phillips	6 ft 9 in (2.06 m)	240 lb (109 kg)	Jr	Pasadena, CA
G	23	Quintin Murrell	6 ft 4 in (1.93 m)	175 lb (79 kg)	So	Milwaukee, WI
G	24	Terrence Lewis	6 ft 6 in (1.98 m)	205 lb (93 kg)	GS	Milwaukee, WI
F	25	William Reynolds	6 ft 4 in (1.93 m)	180 lb (82 kg)	RS Fr	Washington D.C.
G	30	Payton Parrish	6 ft 0 in (1.83 m)	180 lb (82 kg)	So	Milwaukee, WI
F	32	Malik Lamin	6 ft 11 in (2.11 m)	235 lb (107 kg)	RS So	Champlin, MN

Head coach

- Donte Jackson (Central State)

Assistant coach(es)

- Kyle Jones (Arkansas–Pine Bluff)
- Eshaunte Jones (Northern Kentucky)
- Devarus Walker (William Carey)

Legend

- (C) Team captain
- (S) Suspended
- (I) Ineligible
- (W) Walk-on
- Injured
- Current redshirt

Roster
Last update: December 19, 2022

== Schedule and results ==
Date time, TV	Rank^{#}	Opponent^{#}	Result	Record	High points	High rebounds	High assists	Site (attendance) city, state
Non-conference regular season
November 7, 2022*; 7:00 p.m.		UNT Dallas	W 82–57	1–0	18 – Gordon	14 – Gordon	3 – Cowart	Fredrick C. Hobdy Assembly Center (1,719); Grambling, LA
November 11, 2022*; 7:05 p.m., ESPN+		Colorado	W 83–74	2–0	19 – Cowart	7 – Cowart	6 – Cowart	Fredrick C. Hobdy Assembly Center (837); Grambling, LA
November 19, 2022*; ESPN+		at Grand Canyon	L 48–81	2–1	15 – Gordon	6 – Christon	3 – 2 tied	GCU Arena (7,166); Phoenix, AZ
November 22, 2022*; 7:00 p.m., P12N		at Arizona State	L 49–80	2–2	9 – Christon	7 – 3 tied	2 – Cowart	Desert Financial Arena (6,263); Tempe, AZ
November 25, 2022*; 7:30 p.m., CUSA.tv		at UTSA; 210 San Antonio Shootout	W 75–55	3–2	18 – Gordon	9 – Gordon	5 – Moton	Convocation Center (848); San Antonio, TX
November 27, 2022*; 5:00 p.m.		vs. Incarnate Word; 210 San Antonio Shootout	L 61–63	3–3	20 – Christon	10 – Gordon	4 – Gordon	Convocation Center (201); San Antonio, TX
November 28, 2022*; 3:00 p.m.		vs. Dartmouth; 210 San Antonio Shootout	W 73–49	4–3	15 – Christon	11 – Gordon	3 – Cowart	Convocation Center (196); San Antonio, TX
December 3, 2022*; 3:00 p.m.		Incarnate Word	W 72–39	5–3	18 – Cowart	8 – Gordon	5 – Munford	Fredrick C. Hobdy Assembly Center (343); Grambling, LA
December 9, 2022*; 6:00 p.m., SECN		at Vanderbilt	W 64–62	6–3	12 – Gordon	5 – 2 tied	5 – Cowart	Memorial Gymnasium (5,236); Nashville, TN
December 17, 2022*; 4:00 p.m., ACCRSN		at No. 24 Virginia Tech	L 48–74	6–4	12 – Gordon	7 – Cowart	2 – 4 tied	Cassell Coliseum (7,587); Blacksburg, VA
December 19, 2022*; 7:00 p.m., ESPN+		at Liberty	L 56–75	6–5	13 – 2 tied	9 – Smith	4 – Cowart	Liberty Arena (2,379); Lynchburg, VA
December 23, 2022*; 8:00 p.m., BTN		at No. 17 Wisconsin	Canceled due to weather					Kohl Center; Madison, WI
December 29, 2022*; 7:00 p.m.		North American	W 101–42	7–5	19 – Cowart	9 – Christon	5 – Cowart	Fredrick C. Hobdy Assembly Center (190); Grambling, LA
SWAC regular season
January 2, 2023; 7:00 p.m.		at Prairie View A&M	L 60–61	7–6 (0–1)	21 – Christian	6 – tied	4 – cowart	William Nicks Building (946); Prairie View, TX
January 4, 2023; 7:00 p.m.		at Texas Southern	W 85–72	8–6 (1–1)	25 – Christian	9 – Christian	5 – Cowart	H&PE Arena (2,219); Houston, TX
January 7, 2023; 5:30 p.m.		Bethune–Cookman	W 76–70	9–6 (2–1)	20 – Cowart	9 – Gordon	5 – Moton	Fredrick C. Hobdy Assembly Center (1,300); Grambling, LA
January 9, 2023; 7:00 p.m.		Florida A&M	W 62–57	10–6 (3–1)	18 – Cowart	12 – Gordon	3 – tied	Fredrick C. Hobdy Assembly Center (1,362); Grambling, LA
January 14, 2023; 3:00 p.m., HBCUgo		at Southern	L 73–81	10–7 (3–2)	25 – Christon	14 – Cowart	10 – Cowart	F. G. Clark Center (6,327); Baton Rouge, LA
January 21, 2023; 7:00 p.m.		at Mississippi Valley State	W 65–61	11–7 (4–2)	13 – Aku	6 – Aku	3 – Cotton	Harrison HPER Complex (2,109); Itta Bena, MS
January 23, 2023; 7:00 p.m.		at Arkansas–Pine Bluff	W 77–70	12–7 (5–2)	24 – Smith	6 – Aku	8 – Cotton	K. L. Johnson Complex (17,246); Pine Bluff, AR
January 28, 2023; 3:00 p.m., HBCUgo		Jackson State	W 78–66	13–7 (6–2)	17 – Christon	10 – Smith	6 – Cowart	Fredrick C. Hobdy Assembly Center (1,943); Grambling, LA
January 30, 2023; 7:00 p.m.		Alcorn State	L 60–63	13–8 (6–3)	12 – 2 tied	6 – Christon	4 – Cowart	Fredrick C. Hobdy Assembly Center (1,407); Grambling, LA
February 4, 2023; 3:00 p.m., HBCUgo		at Alabama State	W 73–60	14–8 (7–3)	22 – Cotton	11 – Gordon	3 – Christon	Dunn–Oliver Acadome (1,345); Montgomery, AL
February 6, 2023; 7:00 p.m.		at Alabama A&M	W 66–60	15–8 (8–3)	16 – 2 tied	12 – Christon	3 – Gordon	Elmore Gymnasium (872); Normal, AL
February 11, 2023; 5:30 p.m.		Texas Southern	W 65–46	16–8 (9–3)	20 – Cotton	8 – 2 tied	2 – 3 tied	Fredrick C. Hobdy Assembly Center (1,642); Grambling, LA
February 13, 2023; 7:00 p.m.		Prairie View A&M	W 68–64	17–8 (10–3)	18 – Gordon	8 – Gordon	3 – 2 tied	Fredrick C. Hobdy Assembly Center (1,441); Grambling, LA
February 18, 2023; 3:00 p.m., ESPN2/TNT/NBA TV		vs. Southern; NBA HBCU Classic	W 69–64 ^{OT}	18–8 (11–3)	18 – Cowart	9 – Smith	6 – Moton	Jon M. Huntsman Center (6,246); Salt Lake City, UT
February 25, 2023; 5:30 p.m.		at Florida A&M	W 69–55	19–8 (12–3)	17 – Gordon	10 – Smith	4 – Moton	Al Lawson Center (900); Tallahassee, FL
February 27, 2023; 7:00 p.m.		at Bethune–Cookman	W 66–54	20–8 (13–3)	22 – Gordon	8 – Gordon	3 – Moton	Moore Gymnasium; Daytona Beach, FL
March 2, 2023; 7:00 p.m.		Alabama A&M	W 60–48	21–8 (14–3)	14 – tied	8 – Smith	5 – Christon	Fredrick C. Hobdy Assembly Center (1,232); Grambling, LA
March 4, 2023; 5:30 p.m.		Alabama State	W 69–49	22–8 (15–3)	18 – Moton	7 – 2 tied	3 – 2 tied	Fredrick C. Hobdy Assembly Center (1,496); Grambling, LA
SWAC tournament
March 8, 2023; 2:00 p.m., ESPN+	(2)	vs. (7) Bethune-Cookman; Quarterfinals	W 87–72	23–8	23 – Smith	8 – Smith	9 – Cowart	Bartow Arena (478); Birmingham, AL
March 10, 2023; 8:30 p.m., ESPN+	(2)	vs. (3) Jackson State; Semifinals	W 78–69	24–8	18 – 2 tied	8 – Smith	4 – Moton	Bartow Arena (1,792); Birmingham, AL
March 11, 2023; 4:30 p.m., ESPNU	(2)	vs. (8) Texas Southern; Championship	L 58–61	24–9	12 – Munford	10 – Aku	2 – tied	Bartow Arena (1,478); Birmingham, AL
*Non-conference game. ^{#}Rankings from AP poll. (#) Tournament seedings in parentheses. All times are in Central.
