= 2022–23 Prairie View A&M Panthers basketball team =

American college basketball season

2022–23 Prairie View A&M Panthers basketball
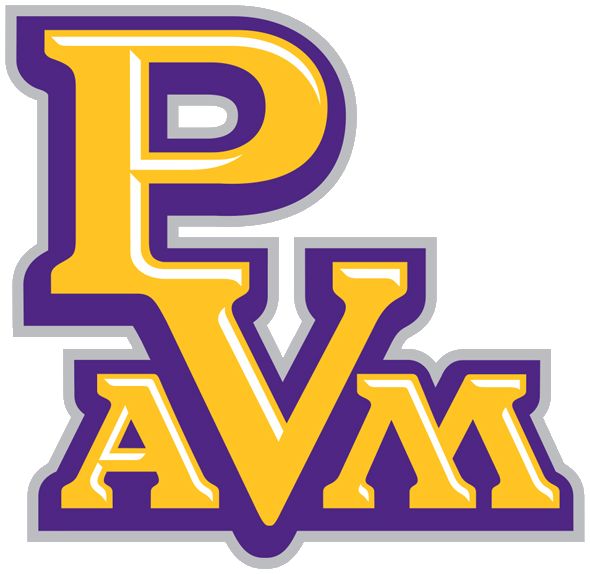
- Conference: Southwestern Athletic Conference
- Record: 13–19 (9–9 SWAC)
- Head coach: Byron Smith (7th season)
- Assistant coaches: Spencer Robertson; James Stafford; Johnnie Williams
- Home arena: William Nicks Building

2022–23 SWAC men's basketball standings
	Conf.				Overall
Team	W		L	PCT	W		L	PCT
Alcorn State	15	–	3	.833	18	–	14	.563
Grambling State	15	–	3	.833	24	–	9	.727
Jackson State	12	–	6	.667	14	–	19	.424
Southern	11	–	7	.611	15	–	17	.469
Alabama A&M	10	–	8	.556	15	–	18	.455
Prairie View A&M	9	–	9	.500	13	–	19	.406
Bethune–Cookman	8	–	10	.444	12	–	20	.375
Texas Southern †	7	–	11	.389	14	–	21	.400
Alabama State	6	–	12	.333	8	–	23	.258
Arkansas–Pine Bluff	6	–	12	.333	10	–	21	.323
Florida A&M	5	–	13	.278	7	–	22	.241
Mississippi Valley State	4	–	14	.222	5	–	27	.156
† 2023 SWAC tournament winner

The 2022–23 Prairie View A&M Panthers basketball team represented Prairie View A&M University in the 2022–23 NCAA Division I men's basketball season. The Panthers, led by seventh-year head coach Byron Smith, played their home games at the William Nicks Building in Prairie View, Texas as members of the Southwestern Athletic Conference (SWAC).

== Previous season ==
The Panthers finished the 2021–22 season 8–19, 8–10 in SWAC play, to finish in a tie for eighth place. In the SWAC tournament, they lost in the first round to Alcorn State.

== Roster ==
2022–23 Prairie View A&M Panthers men's basketball team
Players
Coaches

Pos.	#	Name	Height	Weight	Year	Hometown
F	0	Yahuza Rasas	6 ft 7 in (2.01 m)	200 lb (91 kg)	GS	St. Louis, MO
G	1	Aquarn Butler	5 ft 10 in (1.78 m)	170 lb (77 kg)	Jr	Brooklyn, NY
F	2	Braden Bell	6 ft 7 in (2.01 m)	190 lb (86 kg)	GS	Rowlett, TX
PG	3	Trajan Wesley	5 ft 9 in (1.75 m)	165 lb (75 kg)	GS	Navasota, TX
G	4	Will Douglas	6 ft 5 in (1.96 m)	195 lb (88 kg)	GS	Memphis, TN
G	5	Kortrijk Miles	6 ft 5 in (1.96 m)	170 lb (77 kg)	GS	Dallas, TX
G	10	Jeremiah Gambrell	6 ft 3 in (1.91 m)	180 lb (82 kg)	RS Sr	Houston, TX
G	11	Hegel Augustin	6 ft 3 in (1.91 m)	205 lb (93 kg)	GS	Queens, NY
G	13	Kyle Harding	6 ft 3 in (1.91 m)	185 lb (84 kg)	GS	Long Island, NY
G	15	Kevin McGaskey	6 ft 0 in (1.83 m)	170 lb (77 kg)	Jr	Missouri City, TX
F/C	21	Nikkei Rutty	6 ft 8 in (2.03 m)	235 lb (107 kg)	GS	New Rochelle, NY
PF	23	Brian Myles	6 ft 7 in (2.01 m)	200 lb (91 kg)	So	Shreveport, LA
PG	32	Patrick Neal	6 ft 3 in (1.91 m)	200 lb (91 kg)	RS Fr	Houston, TX
F	33	McKinley Harris	6 ft 5 in (1.96 m)	177 lb (80 kg)	Jr	Alief, TX
G	44	Tekorian Smith	6 ft 5 in (1.96 m)	185 lb (84 kg)	GS	Memphis, TN
G	55	Ricky "Doc" Nelson	6 ft 1 in (1.85 m)	170 lb (77 kg)	GS	Houston, TX

Head coach

- Byron Smith (Houston)

Assistant coach(es)

- Spencer Robertson (Wichita State)
- James Stafford (Siena Heights)
- Johnnie Williams (Morehead State)

Legend

- (C) Team captain
- (S) Suspended
- (I) Ineligible
- (W) Walk-on
- Injured
- Current redshirt

Roster
Last update: January 15, 2023

== Schedule and results ==
Date time, TV	Rank^{#}	Opponent^{#}	Result	Record	High points	High rebounds	High assists	Site (attendance) city, state
Non-conference regular season
November 7, 2022*; 12:00 p.m.		Kansas Christian	W 94–79	1–0	16 – 2 tied	7 – Rasas	3 – 2 tied	William Nicks Building (175); Prairie View, TX
November 9, 2022*; 6:00 p.m.		North American	W 95–68	1–1	23 – Augustin	6 – 2 tied	3 – Nelson	William Nicks Building (734); Prairie View, TX
November 15, 2022*; 6:00 p.m., ESPN+		Washington State; Pac-12/SWAC Legacy Series	W 70–59	3–0	26 – Douglas	7 – 2 tied	6 – Nelson	William Nicks Building (863); Prairie View, TX
November 20, 2022*; 2:00 p.m., ESPN+		at UT Martin	L 79–80	3–1	22 – Douglas	7 – Rasas	6 – 2 tied	Skyhawk Arena (1,037); Martin, TN
November 22, 2022*; 7:00 p.m., CUSA.tv		at UTSA	L 75–82	3–2	19 – Douglas	6 – Rutty	3 – Smith	Convocation Center (1,081); San Antonio, TX
November 25, 2022*; 7:00 p.m., ESPN+		at Arkansas State	W 67–59	4–2	18 – Douglas	9 – Douglas	4 – Wesley	First National Bank Arena (2,495); Jonesboro, AR
November 27, 2022*; 2:00 p.m., ESPN+		at Oklahoma State	L 53–78	4–3	16 – Gambrell	6 – Douglas	2 – 2 tied	Gallagher-Iba Arena (5,683); Stillwater, OK
November 30, 2022*; 7:00 p.m., CUSA.tv		at Rice	L 62–70	4–4	19 – Smith	8 – Miles	3 – Gambrell	Tudor Fieldhouse (1,141); Houston, TX
December 11, 2022*; 1:00 p.m., BTN		at Northwestern	L 51–61	4–5	16 – Gambrell	12 – Augustin	4 – Smith	Welsh–Ryan Arena (3,861); Evanston, IL
December 13, 2022*; 7:00 p.m., ESPN+		at UIC	L 61–70	4–6	20 – Augustin	11 – Augustin	2 – 3 tied	Credit Union 1 Arena (1,081); Chicago, IL
December 17, 2022*; 11:50 a.m., HBCU Go		vs. Montana; Coaches vs. Racism	L 76–81	4–7	21 – 2 tied	5 – Rutty	6 – Nelson	Delmar Fieldhouse (1,243); Houston, TX
December 20, 2022*; 8:00 p.m., MW Network		at New Mexico	L 63–94	4–8	17 – Douglas	5 – Smith	2 – 2 tied	The Pit (9,425); Albuquerque, NM
December 30, 2022*; 6:00 p.m., ESPN+		at Texas A&M	L 66–86	4–9	15 – Douglas	6 – Augustin	4 – Harding	Reed Arena (7,124); College Station, TX
SWAC regular season
January 2, 2023; 7:30 p.m.		Grambling State	W 61–60	5–9 (1–0)	15 – 2 tied	11 – Rasas	6 – Gambrell	William Nicks Building (946); Prairie View, TX
January 4, 2023; 7:30 p.m.		Southern	L 62–66	5–10 (1–1)	25 – Douglas	11 – Rutty	3 – Douglas	William Nicks Building (570); Prairie View, TX
January 7, 2023; 6:00 p.m.		at Mississippi Valley State	W 67–60	6–10 (2–1)	22 – Gambrell	8 – Gambrell	4 – Neal	Harrison HPER Complex (2,701); Itta Bena, MS
January 9, 2023; 5:30 p.m.		at Arkansas–Pine Bluff	L 55–63	6–11 (2–2)	14 – Douglas	8 – Myles	2 – 4 tied	H.O. Clemmons Arena (1,532); Pine Bluff, AR
January 14, 2023; 5:30 p.m.		Jackson State	W 59–50	7–11 (3–2)	18 – 2 tied	17 – Rasas	3 – Myles	William Nicks Building (970); Prairie View, TX
January 16, 2023; 8:00 p.m., ESPNU/ESPN+		Alcorn State	L 68–77 ^{OT}	7–12 (3–3)	21 – Rasas	8 – Rasas	3 – Douglas	William Nicks Building (1,206); Prairie View, TX
January 21, 2023; 5:30 p.m.		at Alabama State	L 55–56 ^{OT}	7–13 (3–4)	21 – Augustin	10 – Augustin	2 – Douglas	Dunn–Oliver Acadome (748); Montgomery, AL
January 23, 2023; 7:30 p.m.		at Alabama A&M	L 59–67	7–14 (3–5)	24 – Smith	5 – Myles	3 – Nelson	Alabama A&M Events Center (2,787); Huntsville, AL
January 28, 2023; 5:00 p.m.		at Texas Southern	W 89–74 ^{2OT}	8–14 (4–5)	21 – Augustin	7 – Augustin	2 – Nelson	H&PE Arena (7,371); Houston, TX
February 4, 2023; 5:30 p.m.		Bethune–Cookman	L 58–60	8–15 (4–6)	15 – Augustin	14 – Augustin	2 – tied	William Nicks Building; Prairie View, TX
February 6, 2023; 7:30 p.m.		Florida A&M	W 75–45	9–15 (5–6)	19 – Douglas	13 – Rutty	8 – Nelson	William Nicks Building (1,890); Prairie View, TX
February 11, 2023; 5:30 p.m.		at Southern	L 65–79	9–16 (5–7)	13 – Douglas	8 – Rutty	10 – Douglas	F. G. Clark Center (5,199); Baton Rouge, LA
February 13, 2023; 7:30 p.m.		at Grambling State	L 64–68	9–17 (5–8)	25 – Rasas	9 – Rasas	4 – Harding	Fredrick C. Hobdy Assembly Center (1,441); Grambling, LA
February 18, 2023; 5:30 p.m.		Arkansas–Pine Bluff	W 82–71	10–17 (6–8)	31 – Douglas	10 – Rasas	5 – Douglas	William Nicks Building (1,138); Prairie View, TX
February 20, 2023; 8:00 p.m., HBCU Go		Mississippi Valley State	W 67–65	11–17 (7–8)	17 – Bell	10 – Augustin	6 – Rasas	William Nicks Building (1,071); Prairie View, TX
February 25, 2023; 5:30 p.m.		at Alcorn State	W 75–71	12–15 (8–8)	23 – Douglas	10 – Rasas	4 – Nelson	Davey Whitney Complex (3,809); Lorman, MS
February 27, 2023; 7:30 p.m.		at Jackson State	L 57–61	12–16 (8–9)	20 – Douglas	10 – Rasas	8 – Nelson	Williams Assembly Center (1,571); Jackson, MS
March 4, 2023; 3:00 p.m.		Texas Southern	W 78–74	13–18 (9–9)	27 – Douglas	11 – Douglas	5 – Douglas	William Nicks Building (3,282); Prairie View, TX
SWAC tournament
March 9, 2023; 2:00 p.m., ESPN+	(6)	vs. (3) Jackson State; Quarterfinals	L 60–62 ^{OT}	13–19	21 – Douglas	14 – Rasas	4 – Smith	Bartow Arena (684); Birmingham, AL
*Non-conference game. ^{#}Rankings from AP poll. (#) Tournament seedings in parentheses. All times are in Central.
