= 2022–23 Utah Tech Trailblazers men's basketball team =

American college basketball season

2022–23 Utah Tech Trailblazers men's basketball
- Conference: Western Athletic Conference
- Record: 14–19 (5–13 WAC)
- Head coach: Jon Judkins (18th season)
- Assistant coaches: Jake Schroeder (4th season); Anthony Morris (2nd season); Gibson Johnson (1st season)
- Home arena: Burns Arena

2022–23 WAC men's basketball standings
	Conf.				Overall
Team	W		L	PCT	W		L	PCT
Utah Valley	15	–	3	.833	28	–	9	.757
Sam Houston	14	–	4	.778	26	–	8	.765
Southern Utah	12	–	6	.667	24	–	13	.649
Grand Canyon †	11	–	7	.611	24	–	12	.667
Seattle	11	–	7	.611	20	–	12	.625
Stephen F. Austin	11	–	7	.611	19	–	13	.594
Tarleton State *	9	–	9	.500	17	–	17	.500
California Baptist	8	–	10	.444	17	–	16	.515
Abilene Christian	7	–	11	.389	13	–	17	.433
UT Rio Grande Valley	6	–	12	.333	15	–	17	.469
UT Arlington	6	–	12	.333	11	–	21	.344
Utah Tech *	5	–	13	.278	14	–	19	.424
New Mexico State **	2	–	16	.111	9	–	15	.375
† Conference tournament winner * Ineligible for the NCAA tournament due to transition from NCAA Division II ** Remaining games as of February 11, 2023 cancelled.

The 2022–23 Utah Tech Trailblazers men's basketball team represented Utah Tech University in the 2022–23 NCAA Division I men's basketball season. The Trailblazers, led by 18th-year head coach Jon Judkins, played home games at Burns Arena in St. George, Utah as members of the Western Athletic Conference (WAC).

The 2022–23 season was Utah Tech's third year of a four-year transition period from Division II to Division I. While the Trailblazers could participate in the WAC tournament, they were not eligible for NCAA postseason play. However, they were eligible to play in the College Basketball Invitational, if invited.

This was Utah Tech's first season under their new name, as it was previously known as Dixie State. The Trailblazers nickname was not affected.

== Previous season ==
The Trailblazers finished the 2021–22 season 13–17, and 6–12 in WAC play. They were not eligible for the WAC tournament.

== Offseason ==
=== Coaching changes ===
Name	Position	Year at Dixie State	Alma mater (year)	Previous job
Gibson Johnson	Assistant coach	1st	Hawaiʻi (2018)	Director of player development at Hawaiʻi

=== Player departures ===
Name	Number	Pos.	Height	Weight	Year	Hometown	Reason for departure
Brock Gilbert	1	G	5'10"	160	Junior	Syracuse, UT	Transferred to Central Washington
Andre Mulibea	4	F	6'6"	210	Freshman	Salt Lake City, UT	Transferred to Salt Lake Community College
Jamaal Barnes	5	G	6'2"	170	Sophomore	Moreno Valley, CA	Transferred
Hunter Bohls	10	G	6'0"	165	Freshman	Las Vegas, NV	Transferred
Chase Berry	30	G	6'6"	225	Senior	Lehi, UT	Graduated
Hunter Schofield	44	F	6'8"	225	Senior	Spanish Fork, UT	Graduated

=== Incoming transfers ===
Name	Number	Pos.	Height	Weight	Year	Hometown	Previous school	Years remaining	Date eligible
Tanner Christensen	30	F/C	6'10"	225	Sophomore	Spokane Valley, WA	Idaho	3	May 4, 2022
Hagen Wright	23	G	6'5"	195	Sophomore	Payson, UT	Snow College	3	April 13, 2022

== Roster ==
2022–23 Utah Tech Trailblazers men's basketball team
Players
Coaches

Pos.	#	Name	Height	Weight	Year	Previous school	Hometown
F	2	Trey Edmonds	6 ft 10 in (2.08 m)	250 lb (113 kg)	So	George Washington HS	Aurora, CO
G	3	Cameron Gooden	5 ft 11 in (1.8 m)	175 lb (79 kg)	Jr	Kilgore CC	Frisco, TX
F	4	Isaac Finlinson	6 ft 6 in (1.98 m)	190 lb (86 kg)	Fr	Dixie HS	St. George, UT
F	10	Chol Deng	6 ft 6 in (1.98 m)	180 lb (82 kg)	Fr	Fairmont Prep	Sydney, Australia
G	11	Noa Gonsalves	6 ft 1 in (1.85 m)	175 lb (79 kg)	So	Lehi HS	Lehi, UT
G/F	12	Stone Hutchings	6 ft 5 in (1.96 m)	195 lb (88 kg)	Fr	Copper Hills HS	West Jordan, UT
G	13	Kade Madsen	6 ft 2 in (1.88 m)	178 lb (81 kg)	Fr	Palo Verde HS	Las Vegas, NV
F	14	Dancell Leter	6 ft 8 in (2.03 m)	195 lb (88 kg)	Sr	Jacksonville College; Odessa JC	Paramaribo, Suriname
G	15	Trevon Snoddy	6 ft 5 in (1.96 m)	180 lb (82 kg)	Fr	Skyridge HS	Lehi, UT
G	20	Asjon Anderson	6 ft 2 in (1.88 m)	160 lb (73 kg)	Fr	Mount Tahoma HS	Tacoma, WA
G	21	Isaiah Pope	6 ft 5 in (1.96 m)	202 lb (92 kg)	Jr	Humboldt State	Yorba Linda, CA
G	22	Frank Staine	6 ft 6 in (1.98 m)	200 lb (91 kg)	So	St. Anthony HS	Inglewood, CA
G	23	Hagen Wright	6 ft 5 in (1.96 m)	195 lb (88 kg)	So	Snow College	Payson, UT
G	24	Jacob Nicolds	6 ft 5 in (1.96 m)	215 lb (98 kg)	Sr	Gilbert HS	Gilbert, AZ
F/C	30	Tanner Christensen	6 ft 10 in (2.08 m)	225 lb (102 kg)	So	University HS; Idaho	Spokane Valley, WA
F	40	Trevon Allfrey	6 ft 8 in (2.03 m)	240 lb (109 kg)	RS So	Seattle	West Jordan, UT
F	54	Caleb Stearman	6 ft 7 in (2.01 m)	195 lb (88 kg)	So	Benedictine University (Arizona)	Las Vegas, NV

Head coach

- Jon Judkins (Utah State)

Assistant coach(es)

- Jake Schroeder (Portland State)
- Gibson Johnson (Hawaiʻi)
- Anthony Morris (Washington)

Legend

- (C) Team captain
- (S) Suspended
- (I) Ineligible
- (W) Walk-on
- Injured
- Current redshirt

Roster
Last update: September 20, 2022

== Schedule and results ==
Date time, TV	Rank^{#}	Opponent^{#}	Result	Record	High points	High rebounds	High assists	Site (attendance) city, state
Non-conference regular season
November 7, 2022*; 8:00 p.m., MWSN		at Nevada	L 71–84	0–1	16 – Gooden	11 – Christensen	3 – Gonsalves	Lawlor Events Center (5,407); Reno, NV
November 12, 2022*; 7:00 p.m., ESPN+		Cal State Northridge	W 69–63	1–1	17 – Gooden	8 – tied	5 – Gooden	Burns Arena (2,297); St. George, UT
November 14, 2022*; 8:00 p.m., P12N		at Washington	L 67–78	1–2	26 – Christensen	7 – tied	4 – Nicolds	Alaska Airlines Arena (5,401); Seattle, WA
November 17, 2022*; 7:00 p.m., P12N		at No. 14 Arizona	L 77–104	1–3	13 – Gonsalves	5 – Leter	3 – Gooden	McKale Center (12,752); Tucson, AZ
November 19, 2022*; 2:00 p.m., ESPN+		at Idaho	W 81–71	2–3	27 – Gooden	8 – Christensen	4 – Gooden	ICCU Arena (1,061); Moscow, ID
November 25, 2022*; 12:00 p.m., ESPN+		at North Dakota	L 52–67	2–4	22 – Gooden	9 – Christensen	2 – Pope	Betty Engelstad Sioux Center (1,248); Grand Forks, ND
November 26, 2022*; 12:00 p.m.		vs. Cal State Fullerton	W 66–60	3–4	13 – Christensen	10 – Christensen	4 – Christensen	Betty Engelstad Sioux Center (71); Grand Forks, ND
December 1, 2022*; 7:00 p.m.		at Utah State	L 81–86	3–5	29 – Gooden	8 – Christensen	5 – Gooden	Dee Glen Smith Spectrum (6,777); Logan, UT
December 3, 2022*; 7:00 p.m., ESPN+		at Weber State	W 77–65	4–5	20 – Christensen	8 – Christensen	6 – Gooden	Dee Events Center (4,663); Ogden, UT
December 9, 2022*; 7:00 p.m., ESPN+		Chapman	W 99–58	5–5	19 – Gonsalves	9 – Christensen	6 – Gooden	Burns Arena (1,133); St. George, UT
December 17, 2022*; 7:00 p.m., ESPN+		Master's	W 100–58	6–5	15 – Gooden	8 – Pope	4 – Gooden	Burns Arena (833); St. George, UT
December 19, 2022*; 7:00 p.m., ESPN+		Westmont	W 80–53	7–5	17 – Gooden	7 – tied	4 – tied	Burns Arena (465); St. George, UT
December 22, 2022*; 7:00 p.m., ESPN+		Lindenwood	W 95–64	8–5	25 – Pope	12 – Christensen	7 – Gooden	Burns Arena (442); St. George, UT
WAC regular season
December 29, 2022; 7:00 p.m., ESPN+		UTRGV	W 81–66	9–5 (1–0)	20 – Pope	13 – Nicolds	6 – Gooden	Burns Arena (710); St. George, UT
December 31, 2022; 2:00 p.m., ESPN+		at Utah Valley	L 60–71	9–6 (1–1)	14 – Pope	7 – Nicolds	4 – Pope	UCCU Center (2,463); Orem, UT
January 5, 2023; 7:00 p.m., ESPN+		at California Baptist	L 58–72	9–7 (1–2)	17 – Christensen	14 – Christensen	4 – Gonsalves	CBU Events Center (2,192); Riverside, CA
January 12, 2023; 7:00 p.m., ESPN+		Stephen F. Austin	L 72–85	9–8 (1–3)	14 – Wright	7 – Nicolds	5 – Staine	Burns Arena (1,256); St. George, UT
January 14, 2023; 7:00 p.m., ESPN+		Sam Houston	L 53–78	9–9 (1–4)	10 – Staine	5 – Edmonds	3 – tied	Burns Arena (1,689); St. George, UT
January 18, 2023; 7:00 p.m., ESPN+		at Grand Canyon	L 85–89	9–10 (1–5)	25 – Pope	6 – Christensen	4 – Gonsalves	GCU Arena (6,041); Phoenix, AZ
January 21, 2023; 7:00 p.m., ESPN+		New Mexico State	W 89–76	10–10 (2–5)	24 – Gonsalves	9 – Christensen	8 – Pope	Burns Arena (1,878); St. George, UT
January 26, 2023; 6:00 p.m., ESPN+		at Tarleton	L 72–74	10–11 (2–6)	27 – Pope	12 – Christensen	3 – Gonsalves	Wisdom Gym; Stephenville, TX
January 28, 2022; 5:00 p.m., ESPN+		at Abilene Christian	L 76–81	10–12 (2–7)	26 – Gooden	7 – Nicolds	3 – tied	Teague Center (1,744); Abilene, TX
February 2, 2023; 7:00 p.m., ESPN+		Utah Valley	L 69–76	10–13 (2–8)	15 – Gooden	6 – Gonsalves	2 – tied	Burns Arena (2,424); St. George, UT
February 4, 2023; 7:00 p.m., ESPN+		Southern Utah	W 86–79	11–13 (3–8)	26 – Gooden	7 – tied	6 – Gooden	Burns Arena (3,962); St. George, UT
February 8, 2023; 8:00 p.m., ESPN+		at Seattle	L 71–75	11–14 (3–9)	17 – Gooden	5 – tied	6 – Gooden	Redhawk Center (1,565); Seattle, WA
February 11, 2023; 7:00 p.m., ESPN+		Tarleton	L 71–75	11–15 (3–10)	17 – Leter	5 – Staine	5 – Gooden	Burns Arena (1,929); St. George, UT
February 17, 2023; 7:00 p.m., ESPN+		at Southern Utah	L 71–81	11–16 (3–11)	24 – Pope	7 – Pope	4 – Christensen	America First Event Center (4,554); Cedar City, UT
February 23, 2023; 5:30 p.m., ESPN+		at UTRGV	W 88–81	12–16 (4–11)	26 – Gooden	9 – Staine	5 – Pope	Bert Ogden Arena (886); Edinburg, TX
February 25, 2023; 1:00 p.m., ESPN+		at UT Arlington	L 69–71 ^{OT}	12–17 (4–12)	18 – Nicolds	14 – Christensen	5 – Pope	College Park Center (1,905); Arlington, TX
March 1, 2023; 7:00 p.m., ESPN+		Seattle U	W 93–56	13–17 (5–12)	22 – Pope	6 – Christensen	3 – tied	Burns Arena (1,306); St. George, UT
March 3, 2023; 7:00 p.m., ESPN+		Grand Canyon	L 61–71	13–18 (5–13)	16 – Gooden	8 – Christensen	3 – tied	Burns Arena (2,141); St. George, UT
WAC tournament
March 7, 2023; 9:00 p.m., ESPN+	(11)	vs. (6) Stephen F. Austin; First round	W 80–76 ^{OT}	14–18	22 – Gooden	6 – tied	5 – tied	Michelob Ultra Arena; Paradise, NV
March 9, 2023; 9:00 p.m., ESPN+	(11)	vs. (3) Southern Utah; Quarterfinals	L 75–76	14–19	35 – Gooden	7 – Staine	5 – Staine	Orleans Arena (1,469); Paradise, NV
*Non-conference game. ^{#}Rankings from AP poll. (#) Tournament seedings in parentheses. All times are in Mountain.

== See also ==
- 2022–23 Utah Tech Trailblazers women's basketball team
