= 2022–23 UT Rio Grande Valley Vaqueros men's basketball team =

American college basketball season

2022–23 UT Rio Grande Valley Vaqueros men's basketball
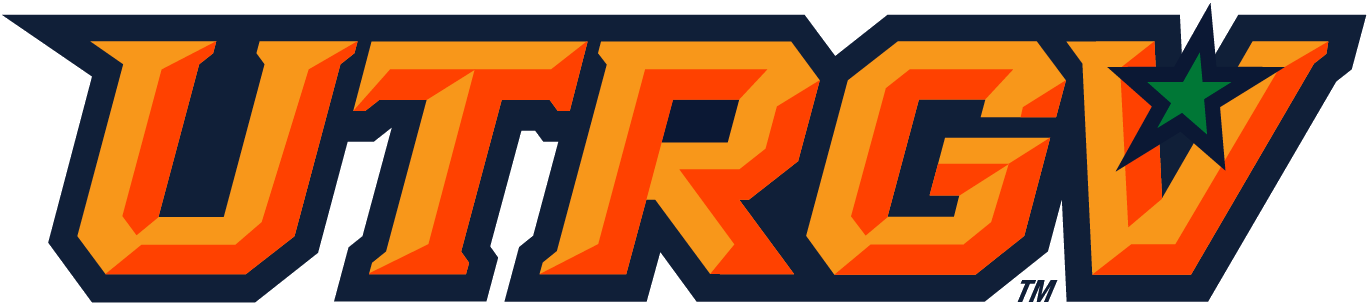
- Conference: Western Athletic Conference
- Record: 15–17 (6–12 WAC)
- Head coach: Matt Figger (2nd season)
- Assistant coaches: Chris Buchanan; Dean Cooper; Nikita Johnson
- Home arena: UTRGV Fieldhouse

2022–23 WAC men's basketball standings
	Conf.				Overall
Team	W		L	PCT	W		L	PCT
Utah Valley	15	–	3	.833	28	–	9	.757
Sam Houston	14	–	4	.778	26	–	8	.765
Southern Utah	12	–	6	.667	24	–	13	.649
Grand Canyon †	11	–	7	.611	24	–	12	.667
Seattle	11	–	7	.611	20	–	12	.625
Stephen F. Austin	11	–	7	.611	19	–	13	.594
Tarleton State *	9	–	9	.500	17	–	17	.500
California Baptist	8	–	10	.444	17	–	16	.515
Abilene Christian	7	–	11	.389	13	–	17	.433
UT Rio Grande Valley	6	–	12	.333	15	–	17	.469
UT Arlington	6	–	12	.333	11	–	21	.344
Utah Tech *	5	–	13	.278	14	–	19	.424
New Mexico State **	2	–	16	.111	9	–	15	.375
† Conference tournament winner * Ineligible for the NCAA tournament due to transition from NCAA Division II ** Remaining games as of February 11, 2023 cancelled.

The 2022–23 UT Rio Grande Valley Vaqueros men's basketball team represented the University of Texas Rio Grande Valley in the 2022–23 NCAA Division I men's basketball season. The Vaqueros, led by second-year head coach Matt Figger, played their home games at the UTRGV Fieldhouse in Edinburg, Texas as members of the Western Athletic Conference (WAC). They finished the season 15–16, 6–12 in WAC play, to finish in a tie for tenth place. They were defeated by Tarleton in the first round of the WAC tournament.

== Previous season ==
The Vaqueros finished the 2021–22 season 8–23, 3–15 in WAC play, to finish in a tie for eleventh place. In the WAC tournament, they were defeated by California Baptist in the first round.

== Roster ==
2022–23 Texas–Rio Grande Valley Vaqueros men's basketball team
Players
Coaches

Pos.	#	Name	Height	Weight	Year	Hometown
G	0	Derrius Ward	6 ft 6 in (1.98 m)	185 lb (84 kg)	So	Philadelphia, PA
G/F	1	Justin Johnson	6 ft 6 in (1.98 m)	185 lb (84 kg)	Sr	Fort Lauderdale, FL
G/F	2	C.J. Jackson	6 ft 7 in (2.01 m)	196 lb (89 kg)	Jr	Atlanta, GA
G	4	Will Johnston	6 ft 3 in (1.91 m)	180 lb (82 kg)	So	Sydney, Australia
G	5	Adante' Holiman	6 ft 0 in (1.83 m)	160 lb (73 kg)	Fr	McAlester, OK
F	10	Dima Zdor	6 ft 10 in (2.08 m)	230 lb (104 kg)	GS	Yalta, Ukraine
F	11	Ahren Freeman	6 ft 7 in (2.01 m)	230 lb (104 kg)	Jr	Jacksonville, FL
G	12	Noels Slivackis	6 ft 5 in (1.96 m)	200 lb (91 kg)	Fr	Valka, Latvia
G	13	Sherman Brashear	6 ft 5 in (1.96 m)	180 lb (82 kg)	So	Rockwall, TX
F	15	Daylen Williams	6 ft 8 in (2.03 m)	195 lb (88 kg)	Jr	Los Angeles, CA
G	20	Louie Jr. Yebra	6 ft 5 in (1.96 m)	180 lb (82 kg)	Fr	Edinburg, TX
F	21	Alex Horiuk	7 ft 0 in (2.13 m)	245 lb (111 kg)	Fr	Chernivtsi, Ukraine
F	23	Isaiah Barganier	6 ft 7 in (2.01 m)	220 lb (100 kg)	Fr	Fulshear, TX
G	24	Lee Hatcher	6 ft 0 in (1.83 m)	205 lb (93 kg)	Fr	Liberal, KS
F	33	John II Shanu	6 ft 11 in (2.11 m)	255 lb (116 kg)	So	Houston, TX

Head coach

- Matt Figger (Eastern Kentucky)

Assistant coach(es)

- Chris Buchanan (Peninsula)
- Dean Cooper (Aquinas (MI))
- Nikita Johnson (West Georgia)

Legend

- (C) Team captain
- (S) Suspended
- (I) Ineligible
- (W) Walk-on
- Injured
- Current redshirt

Roster
Last update: January 15, 2023

== Schedule and results ==
Date time, TV	Rank^{#}	Opponent^{#}	Result	Record	Site (attendance) city, state
Exhibition
November 2, 2022*; 6:30 p.m.		Concordia (TX)	W 136–81	–	UTRGV Fieldhouse (659); Edinburg, TX
Regular season
November 7, 2022*; 8:00 p.m., Big 12 Now		at Kansas State	L 59–93	0–1	Bramlage Coliseum (7,635); Manhattan, KS
November 12, 2022*; 7:00 p.m., ESPN+		Southwestern Adventist	W 115–33	1–1	UTRGV Fieldhouse (678); Edinburg, TX
November 14, 2022*; 7:30 p.m., ESPN+		St. Francis (IL)	W 77–51	2–1	UTRGV Fieldhouse (453); Edinburg, TX
November 17, 2022*; 7:00 p.m., ESPN+		at Texas A&M–Corpus Christi; South Texas Showdown	L 75–97	2–2	American Bank Center (1,493); Corpus Christi, TX
November 21, 2022*; 5:00 p.m., LHN/ESPN+		Western Illinois	W 78–77	3–2	Bert Ogden Arena (6,674); Edinburg, TX
November 22, 2022*; 7:30 p.m., ESPN+		Northern Arizona; Leon Black Classic	W 91–79	4–2	Bert Ogden Arena (1,355); Edinburg, TX
November 26, 2022*; 3:00 p.m., LHN		at No. 4 Texas; Leon Black Classic	L 54–91	4–3	Gregory Gymnasium (3,500); Austin, TX
November 30, 2022*; 6:30 p.m., ESPN+		Texas A&M–Corpus Christi; South Texas Showdown	W 89–82	5–3	UTRGV Fieldhouse (865); Edinburg, TX
December 3, 2022*; 2:30 p.m., ESPN+		at Western Illinois	L 72–90	5–4	Western Hall (603); Macomb, IL
December 10, 2022*; 7:00 p.m., ESPN+		at Houston Christian	W 95–82	6–4	Sharp Gymnasium (591); Houston, TX
December 15, 2022*; 7:30 p.m., ESPN+		Southwestern Christian	W 106–80	7–4	UTRGV Fieldhouse (644); Edinburg, TX
December 18, 2022*; 6:00 p.m., ESPN+		vs. Houston Christian; UTRGV South Padre Island Battle on the Beach	W 100–90	8–4	South Padre Island Convention Centre (676); South Padre Island, TX
December 29, 2022; 8:00 p.m., ESPN+		at Utah Tech	L 66–81	8–5 (0–1)	Burns Arena (710); St. George, UT
December 31, 2022; 2:00 p.m., ESPN+		at Southern Utah	L 88–94 ^{OT}	8–6 (0–2)	America First Event Center (1,204); Cedar City, UT
January 5, 2023; 6:30 p.m., ESPN+		Seattle	L 64–66	8–7 (0–3)	UTRGV Fieldhouse (785); Edinburg, TX
January 7, 2023; 6:30 p.m., ESPN+		Utah Valley	L 61–75	8–8 (0–4)	UTRGV Fieldhouse (517); Edinburg, TX
January 11, 2023; 6:30 p.m., ESPN+		Abilene Christian	W 103–86	9–8 (1–4)	UTRGV Fieldhouse (723); Edinburg, TX
January 14, 2023*; 6:30 p.m., ESPN+		Chicago State	W 85–82	10–8	UTRGV Fieldhouse (1,121); Edinburg, TX
January 19, 2023; 7:00 p.m., ESPN+		at UT Arlington	L 73–85	10–9 (1–5)	College Park Center (1,663); Arlington, TX
January 21, 2023; 4:30 p.m., ESPN+		at Sam Houston	L 64–83	10–10 (1–6)	Bernard Johnson Coliseum (1,674); Huntsville, TX
January 25, 2023; 6:30 p.m., ESPN+		at Stephen F. Austin	L 66–83	10–11 (1–7)	William R. Johnson Coliseum (2,180); Nacogdoches, TX
January 28, 2023; 6:30 p.m., ESPN+		California Baptist	W 64–58	11–11 (2–7)	UTRGV Fieldhouse (2,606); Edinburg, TX
February 1, 2023; 6:30 p.m., ESPN+		Sam Houston	L 65–67	11–12 (2–8)	UTRGV Fieldhouse (1,018); Edinburg, TX
February 4, 2023; 4:00 p.m., ESPN+		at Tarleton	W 68–65	12–12 (3–8)	Wisdom Gym (1,578); Stephenville, TX
February 9, 2023; 6:30 p.m., ESPN+		UT Arlington	L 58–64	12–13 (3–9)	UTRGV Fieldhouse (1,837); Edinburg, TX
February 11, 2023; 6:30 p.m., ESPN+		Stephen F. Austin	L 72–82	12–14 (3–10)	UTRGV Fieldhouse (2,788); Edinburg, TX
February 15, 2023; 8:00 p.m., ESPN+		at Grand Canyon	W 77–76	13–14 (4–10)	GCU Arena (6,039); Phoenix, AZ
February 18, 2023; 8:00 p.m., ESPN+		at New Mexico State	W 2–0 Forfeit	13–14 (5–10)	Pan American Center; Las Cruces, NM
February 20, 2023*; 6:30 p.m., ESPN+		SAGU	W 113–65	14–14	UTRGV Fieldhouse (275); Edinburg, TX
February 23, 2023; 6:30 p.m., ESPN+		Utah Tech	L 81–88	14–15 (5–11)	UTRGV Fieldhouse (886); Edinburg, TX
February 25, 2023; 6:30 p.m., ESPN+		Tarleton	W 99–95 ^{OT}	15–15 (6–11)	UTRGV Fieldhouse (1,431); Edinburg, TX
March 1, 2023; 9:00 p.m., ESPN+		at California Baptist	L 70–88	15–16 (6–12)	CBU Events Center (3,296); Riverside, CA
WAC tournament
March 7, 2023; 6:00 p.m., ESPN+	(10)	vs. (7) Tarleton; First round	L 70–74	15–17	Michelob Ultra Arena; Paradise, NV
*Non-conference game. ^{#}Rankings from AP poll. (#) Tournament seedings in parentheses. All times are in Central.
