= 2023 WAC men's basketball tournament =

Postseason men's basketball tournament

- Classification: Division I
- Season: 2022–23
- Teams: 12
- Site: Michelob Ultra Arena (first round); Orleans Arena (all other games); Paradise, Nevada
- Champions: Grand Canyon (2nd title)
- Winning coach: Bryce Drew (2nd title)
- MVP: Ray Harrison, Grand Canyon
- Television: ESPN+, ESPN2

2022–23 WAC men's basketball standings
	Conf.				Overall
Team	W		L	PCT	W		L	PCT
Utah Valley	15	–	3	.833	28	–	9	.757
Sam Houston	14	–	4	.778	26	–	8	.765
Southern Utah	12	–	6	.667	24	–	13	.649
Grand Canyon †	11	–	7	.611	24	–	12	.667
Seattle	11	–	7	.611	20	–	12	.625
Stephen F. Austin	11	–	7	.611	19	–	13	.594
Tarleton State *	9	–	9	.500	17	–	17	.500
California Baptist	8	–	10	.444	17	–	16	.515
Abilene Christian	7	–	11	.389	13	–	17	.433
UT Rio Grande Valley	6	–	12	.333	15	–	17	.469
UT Arlington	6	–	12	.333	11	–	21	.344
Utah Tech *	5	–	13	.278	14	–	19	.424
New Mexico State **	2	–	16	.111	9	–	15	.375
† Conference tournament winner * Ineligible for the NCAA tournament due to transition from NCAA Division II ** Remaining games as of February 11, 2023 cancelled.

The 2023 WAC men's basketball tournament is the postseason men's basketball tournament of the Western Athletic Conference (WAC) for the 2022–23 season. The conference tournament is scheduled to be played from March 7–11, 2023, at Michelob ULTRA Arena and the Orleans Arena in Paradise, Nevada near Las Vegas. The first round will be played on March 7 at Michelob ULTRA Arena with the remaining rounds March 9–11 at the Orleans Arena. The winner of the conference tournament, Grand Canyon, received the conference's automatic bid to the NCAA tournament.

== Seeds ==
Twelve of the thirteen members were invited to the tournament. While Tarleton and Utah Tech were ineligible for the NCAA tournament, they were eligible for the WAC tournament. New Mexico State canceled the remainder of its season on February 11, 2023 due to an ongoing investigation of hazing incidents within the program. Teams were seeded using the WAC Resume Seeding rankings. The WAC Resume Seeding rankings are an advanced analytic developed by Ken Pomeroy that incorporates the performance of teams in both conference and non-conference games. Rankings were initially released on December 5. While seedings were determined using the WAC Resume Seeding System, the top 12 teams that qualified for the tournament were determined based on conference league records. Since New Mexico State suspended its season, the remaining 12 teams participated in the tournament (as reflected in the seedings released starting with the February 13 rankings shown in the table below). Regardless of which team received the top seed from the WAC Resume Seeding rankings, the regular season conference champion was determined based on conference win percentage.

If a team that was not eligible for the NCAA Tournament won the WAC Tournament, the conference's automatic bid would have gone to the highest seeded tournament-eligible team.

Seed	School	Conference	WAC Points	KenPom Ranking (Mar. 4)
1	Sam Houston	14–4	6.977	66
2	Utah Valley	15–3	6.964	79
3	Southern Utah	13–6	3.147	102
4	Seattle U	11–7	3.102	144
5	Grand Canyon	11–7	2.771	120
6	Stephen F. Austin	11–7	1.131	129
7	Tarleton	10–8	–0.069	161
8	California Baptist	8–10	–1.980	158
9	Abilene Christian	7–11	–2.538	187
10	UTRGV	6–12	–3.163	250
11	Utah Tech	5–13	–3.519	157
12	UT Arlington	6–12	–5.067	245

Seed	Dec. 5	Dec. 13	Dec. 20	Dec. 27	Jan. 3	Jan. 10	Jan. 17	Jan. 24	Jan. 30	Feb. 7	Feb. 13	Feb. 21	Feb. 28	Mar. 4
1	SHSU	SHSU	SHSU	SHSU	SHSU	UVU	UVU	UVU	SHSU	UVU	UVU	UVU	UVU	SHSU
2	SU	SU	SU	UVU	UVU	SHSU	SU	SU	UVU	SHSU	SHSU	SHSU	SHSU	UVU
3	GCU	GCU	GCU	SU	(T) SU	SU	SHSU	SHSU	SU	SUU	SU	SUU	SUU	SUU
4	TAR	UVU	UVU	GCU	(T) GCU	GCU	SUU	GCU	SUU	SU	SUU	SU	SU	SU
5	UT	NMSU	NMSU	NMSU	SUU	SUU	GCU	SUU	GCU	GCU	GCU	GCU	SFA	GCU
6	NMSU	(T) CBU	UT	UT	UT	SFA	SFA	SFA	SFA	SFA	SFA	SFA	GCU	SFA
7	UTRGV	(T) UT	CBU	SUU	SFA	UT	TAR	CBU	TAR	TAR	TAR	TAR	TAR	TAR
8	UVU	SUU	SUU	TAR	NMSU	TAR	CBU	TAR	CBU	ACU	ACU	CBU	CBU	CBU
9	CBU	TAR	UTRGV	UTRGV	TAR	CBU	UT	UT	UT	CBU	CBU	ACU	ACU	ACU
10	SUU	UTRGV	TAR	CBU	UTRGV	NMSU	UTRGV	UTRGV	UTRGV	UT	UT	UTRGV	UTRGV	UTRGV
11	SFA	SFA	SFA	SFA	ACU	ACU	ACU	ACU	ACU	UTRGV	UTRGV	UT	UT	UT
12	UTA	ACU	ACU	ACU	CBU	UTRGV	NMSU	NMSU	NMSU	NMSU	UTA	UTA	UTA	UTA
13	ACU	UTA	UTA	UTA	UTA	UTA	UTA	UTA	UTA	UTA	---	---	---	---

== Schedule ==
Session	Game	Time*	Matchup^{#}	Score	Television	Attendance
First round – Tuesday, March 7, 2023 – Michelob ULTRA Arena
1	1	12:00pm	No. 8 California Baptist vs. No. 9 Abilene Christian	69−62	ESPN+	
1	2	2:00pm	No. 5 Grand Canyon vs. No. 12 UT Arlington	82−77	ESPN+	
1	3	6:00pm	No. 7 Tarleton vs. No. 10 UT Rio Grande Valley	74−70	ESPN+	
1	4	8:00pm	No. 6 Stephen F. Austin vs. No. 11 Utah Tech	76−80^{OT}	ESPN+	
Quarterfinals – Thursday, March 9, 2023 – Orleans Arena
2	5	12:00pm	No. 1 Sam Houston vs. No. 8 California Baptist	64–51	ESPN+	
2	6	2:00pm	No. 4 Seattle vs. No. 5 Grand Canyon	79–84	ESPN+	
2	7	6:00pm	No. 2 Utah Valley vs. No. 7 Tarleton	72–58	ESPN+	
2	8	8:00pm	No. 3 Southern Utah vs. No. 11 Utah Tech	76–75	ESPN+	
Semifinals – Friday, March 10, 2023 – Orleans Arena
3	9	6:00pm	No. 1 Sam Houston vs. No. 5 Grand Canyon	75–78	ESPN+	
3	10	8:00pm	No. 2 Utah Valley vs. No. 3 Southern Utah	88–89	ESPN+	
Championship – Saturday, March 11, 2023 – Orleans Arena
4	11	8:30 p.m.	No. 5 Grand Canyon vs. No. 3 Southern Utah	84–66	ESPN2	
*Game times in PT. #-Rankings denote tournament seeding.

== Bracket ==
First round Tuesday, March 7
8	Cal Baptist	69
9	Abilene Christian	62
5	Grand Canyon	82
12	UT Arlington	77
7	Tarleton	74
10	UTRGV	70
6	Stephen F. Austin	76
11	Utah Tech	80*

Quarterfinals; Thursday, March 9
1	Sam Houston	64
8	Cal Baptist	51
4	Seattle	79
5	Grand Canyon	82
2	Utah Valley	72
7	Tarleton	58
3	Southern Utah	76
11	Utah Tech	75

Semifinals; Friday, March 10
1	Sam Houston	75
5	Grand Canyon	78
2	Utah Valley	88
3	Southern Utah	89

Championship; Saturday, March 11
5	Grand Canyon	84
3	Southern Utah	66

* denotes overtime period

== Awards ==
Award	Player	Team
Most Outstanding Player	Ray Harrison	Grand Canyon
All-Tournament Team	Ray Harrison	Grand Canyon
All-tournament team	Gabe McGlothan	Grand Canyon
All-tournament team	Harrison Butler	Southern Utah
All-tournament team	Tevian Jones	Southern Utah
All-tournament team	Trey Woodbury	Utah Valley

== See also ==
- 2023 WAC women's basketball tournament
