= 2022–23 Western Athletic Conference men's basketball season =

2022–23 WAC men's basketball season
- League: NCAA Division I
- Sport: Basketball
- Teams: 13
- TV partner(s): ESPN, ESPN+

Regular season
- Season MVP: Qua Grant

WAC tournament

WAC men's basketball seasons
- ← 2021–22 2023–24 →

2022–23 WAC men's basketball standings
	Conf.				Overall
Team	W		L	PCT	W		L	PCT
Utah Valley	15	–	3	.833	28	–	9	.757
Sam Houston	14	–	4	.778	26	–	8	.765
Southern Utah	12	–	6	.667	24	–	13	.649
Grand Canyon †	11	–	7	.611	24	–	12	.667
Seattle	11	–	7	.611	20	–	12	.625
Stephen F. Austin	11	–	7	.611	19	–	13	.594
Tarleton State *	9	–	9	.500	17	–	17	.500
California Baptist	8	–	10	.444	17	–	16	.515
Abilene Christian	7	–	11	.389	13	–	17	.433
UT Rio Grande Valley	6	–	12	.333	15	–	17	.469
UT Arlington	6	–	12	.333	11	–	21	.344
Utah Tech *	5	–	13	.278	14	–	19	.424
New Mexico State **	2	–	16	.111	9	–	15	.375
† Conference tournament winner * Ineligible for the NCAA tournament due to transition from NCAA Division II ** Remaining games as of February 11, 2023 cancelled.

The 2022–23 WAC men's basketball season began with practices in October 2022 followed by the start of the 2022–23 NCAA Division I men's basketball season in November 2022. The conference began play in December 2022. This is the WAC's 61st season of basketball. The WAC competed again with 13 teams with two teams leaving the conference and two teams joining the conference from the prior year. Chicago State turned independent and Lamar moved to the Southland Conference. Southern Utah University joins from the Big Sky Conference and UT Arlington joins from the Sun Belt Conference. Dixie State was also renamed as Utah Tech. Each WAC member played an 18-game conference schedule. The WAC tournament was held March 6–11, 2023 at the Orleans Arena in Las Vegas, Nevada.

== Pre-season ==
=== WAC Media days ===
The WAC's 2022 men's basketball media day was held on October 18.

Men's Basketball Coaches Preseason Poll
Place	Team	Points	First place votes
1.	Grand Canyon	135	8
2.	New Mexico State	127	3
3.	Stephen F. Austin	111	--
4.	Abilene Christian	101	1
5.	California Baptist	96	1
6.	Seattle U	91	--
7.	Utah Valley	85	
8.	Sam Houston	79	--
9.	Southern Utah	66	--
10.	Tarleton	47	--
11.	UT Arlington	31	--
12.	Utah Tech	29	--
13.	UTRGV	16	--

Men's Basketball Media Preseason Poll
Place	Team
1.	Grand Canyon
2.	New Mexico State
3.	Stephen F. Austin
4.	Abilene Christian
5.	California Baptist
6T.	Sam Houston
6T.	Seattle U
8.	Utah Valley
9.	Southern Utah
10.	UT Arlington
11.	Tarleton
12.	Utah Tech
13.	UTRGV

=== WAC Preseason All-Conference ===
First Team

Name	School	Yr.	Pos.
Airion Simmons	Abilene Christian	Sr.	F
Taran Armstrong	California Baptist	So.	G
† Jovan Blacksher Jr.	Grand Canyon	Jr.	G
Xavier Pinson	NM State	Sr.	G
Cameron Tyson	Seattle U	Jr.	G
Tevian Jones	Southern Utah	Sr.	G/F
Justin Johnson	UTRGV	Sr.	F
Trey Woodbury	Utah Valley	Sr.	G

† Denotes Preseason Player of the Year

Second Team

Name	School	Yr.	Pos.
Rayshon Harrison	Grand Canyon	So.	G
Gabe McGlothan	Grand Canyon	Jr.	F
Javion May	Sam Houston	Sr.	G
Riley Grigsby	Seattle U	Sr.	G/F
Maizen Fausett	Southern Utah	Sr.	F
Sadaidriene Hall	Stephen F. Austin	So.	F
Jaylin Jackson-Posey	Stephen F. Austin	So.	G
Freddy Hicks	Tarleton	Jr.	G/F

== Regular season ==
=== Early season tournaments ===
Team	Tournament	Finish
Abilene Christian	Vegas 4	4th
California Baptist	SoCal Challenge (Surf Division)	4th
Grand Canyon	Hall of Fame Classic	3rd
New Mexico State	Las Vegas Holiday Classic	2nd
Sam Houston	Fort Myers Tip-Off (Palms Division)	1st
Seattle U	Diamond Head Classic	7th
Southern Utah	North Shore Classic	3rd
Stephen F. Austin	Montreal Northern Classic	4th
Tarleton	Paradise Jam	2nd
UT Arlington	Gulf Coast Showcase	6th
UTRGV	Leon Black Classic	2nd
Utah Tech	North Dakota MTE	2nd
Utah Valley	Jamaica Classic (Rose Hall Division)	3rd

=== Records against other conferences ===
2022–23 records against non-conference foes:

Regular season

Power Conferences & Gonzaga	Record
ACC	1–1
Big East	0–0
Big Ten	0–1
Big 12	1–7
Pac-12	3–7
SEC	0–2
Gonzaga	0–0
Power Conference Total	5–18
Other NCAA Division I Conferences	Record
America East	1–0
American	0–4
A-10	2–0
ASUN	0–0
Big Sky	15–4
Big South	1–0
Big West	9–3
CAA	1–1
C-USA	2–3
Horizon	2–2
Ivy League	0–0
MAAC	0–2
MAC	2–0
MEAC	0–1
MVC	2–2
Mountain West	2–10
NEC	0–0
OVC	1–0
Patriot League	0–0
SoCon	1–1
Southland	4–2
SWAC	5–1
The Summit	4–2
Sun Belt	2–2
WCC (except Gonzaga)	4–3
Other Division I Total	60–44
Non-Division I Total	36–0
NCAA Division I Total	65–62

=== Record against ranked non-conference opponents ===
This is a list of games against ranked opponents only (rankings from the AP Poll):

Date	Visitor	Home	Score	Conference record
November 17, 2022	Utah Tech	No. 14 Arizona	L, 77–104	0–1
November 18, 2022	Southern Utah	No. 6 Kansas	L, 76–82	0–2
November 26, 2022	UTRGV	No. 4 Texas	L, 54–91	0–3
December 6, 2022	Tarleton	No. 12 Baylor	L, 57–80	0–4

Team rankings are reflective of AP poll when the game was played, not current or final ranking

=== Rankings ===
	Improvement in ranking
	Drop in ranking
RV	Received votes but were not ranked in Top 25
NV	No votes received

		Pre	Wk 2	Wk 3	Wk 4	Wk 5	Wk 6	Wk 7	Wk 8	Wk 9	Wk 10	Wk 11	Wk 12	Wk 13	Wk 14	Wk 15	Wk 16	Wk 17	Wk 18	Final
Abilene Christian	AP	NV	NV	NV	NV	NV	NV	NV	NV	NV	NV	NV	NV	NV	NV	NV	NV	NV	NV	NV
Abilene Christian	C	NV	NV	NV	NV	NV	NV	NV	NV	NV	NV	NV	NV	NV	NV	NV	NV	NV	NV	NV
California Baptist	AP	NV	NV	NV	NV	NV	NV	NV	NV	NV	NV	NV	NV	NV	NV	NV	NV	NV	NV	NV
California Baptist	C	NV	NV	NV	NV	NV	NV	NV	NV	NV	NV	NV	NV	NV	NV	NV	NV	NV	NV	NV
Grand Canyon	AP	NV	NV	NV	NV	NV	NV	NV	NV	NV	NV	NV	NV	NV	NV	NV	NV	NV	NV	NV
Grand Canyon	C	NV	NV	NV	NV	NV	NV	NV	NV	NV	NV	NV	NV	NV	NV	NV	NV	NV	NV	NV
New Mexico State	AP	NV	NV	NV	NV	NV	NV	NV	NV	NV	NV	NV	NV	NV	NV	NV	NV	NV	NV	NV
New Mexico State	C	NV	NV	NV	NV	NV	NV	NV	NV	NV	NV	NV	NV	NV	NV	NV	NV	NV	NV	NV
Sam Houston	AP	NV	NV	NV	NV	NV	NV	NV	NV	NV	NV	NV	NV	NV	NV	NV	NV	NV	NV	NV
Sam Houston	C	NV	NV	NV	NV	NV	NV	NV	NV	NV	NV	NV	NV	NV	NV	NV	NV	NV	NV	NV
Seattle U	AP	NV	NV	NV	NV	NV	NV	NV	NV	NV	NV	NV	NV	NV	NV	NV	NV	NV	NV	NV
Seattle U	C	NV	NV	NV	NV	NV	NV	NV	NV	NV	NV	NV	RV	NV	NV	NV	NV	NV	NV	NV
Southern Utah	AP	NV	NV	NV	NV	NV	NV	NV	NV	NV	NV	NV	NV	NV	NV	NV	NV	NV	NV	NV
Southern Utah	C	NV	NV	NV	NV	NV	NV	NV	NV	NV	NV	NV	NV	NV	NV	NV	NV	NV	NV	NV
Stephen F. Austin	AP	NV	NV	NV	NV	NV	NV	NV	NV	NV	NV	NV	NV	NV	NV	NV	NV	NV	NV	NV
Stephen F. Austin	C	NV	NV	NV	NV	NV	NV	NV	NV	NV	NV	NV	NV	NV	NV	NV	NV	NV	NV	NV
Tarleton	AP	NV	NV	NV	NV	NV	NV	NV	NV	NV	NV	NV	NV	NV	NV	NV	NV	NV	NV	NV
Tarleton	C	NV	NV	NV	NV	NV	NV	NV	NV	NV	NV	NV	NV	NV	NV	NV	NV	NV	NV	NV
UT Arlington	AP	NV	NV	NV	NV	NV	NV	NV	NV	NV	NV	NV	NV	NV	NV	NV	NV	NV	NV	NV
UT Arlington	C	NV	NV	NV	NV	NV	NV	NV	NV	NV	NV	NV	NV	NV	NV	NV	NV	NV	NV	NV
UTRGV	AP	NV	NV	NV	NV	NV	NV	NV	NV	NV	NV	NV	NV	NV	NV	NV	NV	NV	NV	NV
UTRGV	C	NV	NV	NV	NV	NV	NV	NV	NV	NV	NV	NV	NV	NV	NV	NV	NV	NV	NV	NV
Utah Tech	AP	NV	NV	NV	NV	NV	NV	NV	NV	NV	NV	NV	NV	NV	NV	NV	NV	NV	NV	NV
Utah Tech	C	NV	NV	NV	NV	NV	NV	NV	NV	NV	NV	NV	NV	NV	NV	NV	NV	NV	NV	NV
Utah Valley	AP	NV	NV	NV	NV	NV	NV	NV	NV	NV	NV	NV	NV	NV	NV	NV	NV	NV	NV	NV
Utah Valley	C	NV	NV	NV	NV	NV	NV	NV	NV	NV	NV	NV	NV	NV	NV	NV	NV	NV	NV	NV

== Head coaches ==
=== Coaching changes ===
Only one coaching change was made during the offseason. Greg Heiar was hired on March 27 as the 27th head coach at New Mexico State University to replace Chris Jans who had previously been hired as the head coach at Mississippi State University.

=== Coaches ===
Note: Stats shown are before the beginning of the season. Overall and WAC records are from time at current school.

Team	Head coach	Previous job	Seasons at school	Overall record	WAC record	WAC titles	NCAA tournaments	NCAA Final Fours	NCAA Championships
Abilene Christian	Brette Tanner	(Associate HC)	2nd	25–11 (.694)	11–7 (.611)	0	0	0	0
California Baptist	Rick Croy	St. Mary's (assistant)	10th	68-50 (.576)	30-32 (.484)	0	0	0	0
Grand Canyon	Bryce Drew	Vanderbilt	3rd	40-15 (.727)	22-8 (.733)	1	1	0	0
New Mexico State	Greg Heiar	Northwest Florida State College	1st	0-0 (–)	0-0 (–)	0	0	0	0
Sam Houston	Jason Hooten	(Assistant HC)	13th	235-161 (.593)	140-72 (.660)	0	0	0	0
Seattle U	Chris Victor	(Assistant/interim HC)	2nd	23-9 (.719)	14-4 (.778)	1	0	0	0
Southern Utah	Todd Simon	UNLV (interim HC)	7th	96-94 (.505)	0-0 (–)	0	0	0	0
Stephen F. Austin	Kyle Keller	Texas A&M (assistant)	7th	126-55 (.696)	14–4 (.778)	1	0	0	0
Tarleton	Billy Gillispie	Ranger College	3rd	24-27 (.471)	14-16 (.467)	0	1	0	0
UT Arlington	Greg Young	(Assistant)	2nd	11-18 (.379)	0-0 (–)	0	0	0	0
UTRGV	Matt Figger	Austin Peay	2nd	8-23 (.258)	3-15 (.167)	0	0	0	0
Utah Tech	Jon Judkins	Snow College	18th	306-149 (.673)	10-22 (.313)	0	0	0	0
Utah Valley	Mark Madsen	Los Angeles Lakers (player development)	4th	42-42 (.500)	24-22 (.522)	1	0	0	0

Notes:

- Overall and WAC records, conference titles, etc. are from time at current school and are through the end of the 2021–22 season.
- Records and season totals only include time spent at Division I as head coach.
- NCAA tournament appearances are from time at current school only.
- NCAA Final Fours and Championship include time at other schools.

== Postseason ==
=== WAC tournament ===
The conference tournament was played from March 7–11, 2023, at Michelob ULTRA Arena and the Orleans Arena in Paradise, Nevada near Las Vegas. The first round was played on March 7 at Michelob ULTRA Arena with the remaining rounds March 8–11 at the Orleans Arena. Twelve of the thirteen members were invited to the tournament. While Tarleton and Utah Tech were ineligible for the NCAA tournament, they were eligible for the WAC tournament.

=== NCAA tournament ===
Teams from the conference that were selected to participate:

Seed	Region	School	First Four	First round	Second round	Sweet Sixteen	Elite Eight	Final Four	Championship
14	West	Grand Canyon	–	lost to (3) Gonzaga 70–82	–	–	–	–	–
	Bids	W-L (%):	0–0 (–)	0–1 (.000)	0–0 (–)	0–0 (–)	0–0 (–)	0–0 (–)	TOTAL: 0–1 (.000)

=== National Invitation Tournament ===
Number from the conference that were selected to participate: 2

Seed	School	First round	Second round	Quarterfinals	Semifinals	Finals
3	Sam Houston	defeated Santa Clara 58–56	lost to (2) North Texas 55–75	–	–	–
N/A	Utah Valley	defeated (2) New Mexico 83–69	defeated (3) Colorado 81–69	defeated (4) Cincinnati 74–68	lost to (4) UAB 86–88*	–
	W-L (%):	2–0 (1.000)	1–1 (.500)	1–0 (1.000)	0–1 (.000)	TOTAL: 4–2 (.667)

=== College Basketball Invitational ===
Number from the conference that were selected to participate: 2

Seed	School	First round	Quarterfinals	Semifinals	Finals
4	Southern Utah	defeated (13) North Alabama 72–50	defeated (12) Rice 81–79	lost to (8) Eastern Kentucky 106–108**	–
7	Tarleton	lost to (10) Radford 70–72*	–	–	–
	W-L (%):	1–1 (.500)	1–0 (1.000)	0–1 (.000)	TOTAL: 2–2 (.500)

Index to colors and formatting
WAC member won
WAC member lost

*Denotes overtime period

== Awards and honors ==
=== Players of the week ===
Throughout the conference regular season, the WAC offices name a player of the week, and a freshman of the week each Monday.

Week	Player of the Week	School	Freshman of the Week	School
November 14	Cameron Tyson	Seattle U	Adante' Holiman	UTRGV
November 21	Freddy Hicks	Tarleton	Parsa Fallah	Southern Utah
November 28	Justin Johnson	UTRGV	Kobe Knox	Grand Canyon
December 5	Le'Tre Darthard	Utah Valley	Brandon Walker	UT Arlington
December 12	Aziz Bandaogo	Utah Valley	Parsa Fallah	Southern Utah
December 19	Justin Johnson	UTRGV	Adante' Holiman	UTRGV
December 27	Trey Woodbury	Utah Valley	Parsa Fallah	Southern Utah
January 3	Tevian Jones	Southern Utah	Anthony Wrzeszcz	Sam Houston
January 10	Aziz Bandaogo	Utah Valley	Chendall Weaver	UT Arlington
January 17	Riley Grigsby	Seattle U	Kobe Knox	Grand Canyon
January 24	Riley Grigsby	Seattle U	Chendall Weaver	UT Arlington
January 30	Taran Armstrong	Cal Baptist	Leonardo Bettiol	Abilene Christian
February 6	Ray Harrison	Grand Canyon	Chendall Weaver	UT Arlington
February 13	Le'Tre Darthard	Utah Valley	Adante' Holiman	UTRGV
February 20	Gabe McGlothan	Grand Canyon	Chendall Weaver	UT Arlington
February 27	Qua Grant	Sam Houston	Kobe Knox	Grand Canyon
March 4	Ray Harrison	Grand Canyon	Adante Holiman	UTRGV

==== Totals per school - Players of the week ====
School	Player of the week	Freshman of the week	Total
Abilene Christian University		1	1
California Baptist University	1		1
Grand Canyon University	3	3	6
New Mexico State University			
Sam Houston State University	1	1	2
Seattle University	3		3
Southern Utah University	1	3	4
Stephen F. Austin State University			
Tarleton State University	1		1
University of Texas at Arlington		5	5
University of Texas Rio Grande Valley	2	4	6
Utah Tech University			
Utah Valley University	5		5
Total	17	17	34

=== All-WAC ===
First team

Name	School
Ray Harrison	Grand Canyon
Qua Grant‡	Sam Houston
Cameron Tyson	Seattle U
Tevian Jones	Southern Utah
Aziz Bandaogo‡‡	Utah Valley
Le'Tre Darthard	Utah Valley
Trey Woodbury	Utah Valley
Justin Johnson	UTRGV

- ‡ WAC Player of the Year
- ‡‡ WAC Defensive Player of the Year

Second team

Name	School
Taran Armstrong	California Baptist
Gabe McGlothan	Grand Canyon
Donte Powers	Sam Houston
Riley Grigsby	Seattle U
Maizen Fausett	Southern Utah
Sadaidriene Hall	Stephen F. Austin
Freddy Hicks	Tarleton
Cameron Gooden	Utah Tech

==== All-Newcomer team ====
Name	School
Ray Harrison	Grand Canyon
Qua Grant	Sam Houston
Cameron Huefner	Sam Houston
Drake Allen	Southern Utah
Aziz Bandaogo†	Utah Valley

† Newcomer of the Year

==== All-Defensive team ====
Name	School
Damien Daniels	Abilene Christian
Javion May	Sam Houston
Shamir Bogues	Tarleton
Aziz Bandaogo	Utah Valley
Le'Tre Darthard	Utah Valley

- ‡WAC Defensive Player of the Year

==== Other awards ====
Sixth Man of the Year: Dee Barnes, Southern Utah

Freshman of the Year: Chendall Weaver, UT Arlington

Coach of the Year: Mark Madsen, Utah Valley

== 2023 NBA draft ==
Round	Pick	Player	Position	Nationality	Team	School/club team
−	−				−	

== Home game attendance ==
Team	Stadium	Capacity	Game 1	Game 2	Game 3	Game 4	Game 5	Game 6	Game 7	Game 8	Game 9	Game 10	Game 11	Game 12	Game 13	Game 14	Game 15	Game 16	Game 17	Total	Average	% of Capacity
Abilene Christian	Moody Coliseum	3,600	2,489†	1,643	974	747	1,204	897	1,152	1,122	2,005	1,889	1,744	N/A	1,844	1,951				19,661	1,512	42%
California Baptist	CBU Events Center	5,050	4,466	**5,050†**	2,602	2,067	4,038	2,817	2,345	2,883	2,192	2,611	5,050	4,011	2,705	3,128	**5,050**	2,225	3,296	56,536	3,326	66%
Grand Canyon	GCU Arena	7,000	**7,171**	6,891	**7,166**	6,873	6,713	**7,011**	**7,072**	6,804	**7,316**	6,982	6,041	**7,007**	**7,095**	**7,076**	6,039	**7,438†**	**7,414**	118,109	6,948	99%
New Mexico State	Pan American Center	12,482	5,178	6,332†	4,346	4,460	4,942	4,705	5,092	4,864	5,107	4,948								49,974	4,997	40%
Sam Houston	Bernard Johnson Coliseum	6,110	1,892†	1,320	1,127	731	777	1,702	3,686	1,674	1,845	1,332	1,613	1,772	1,866					21,337	1,641	27%
Seattle U	Redhawk Center/Climate Pledge Arena	999/18,100	896	**999**	683	1,277‡	780	767	2,265	901	928	2,045†‡	1,565‡	**999**	**999**	**1,175**				16,279	1,163	116%
Southern Utah	America First Event Center	5,300	1,718	1,534	1,173	2,116	959	873	1,204	2,178	1,583	2,093	4,013	1,862	4,554†	1.460	1.859			29,179	1,945	37%
Stephen F. Austin	William R. Johnson Coliseum	7,203	2,610	2,049	2,128	2,339	2,023	1,939	1,841	2,814	2,644	3,286	2,180	3,303	2,180	3,488	3,554	4.189†		42,567	2,660	37%
Tarleton State	Wisdom Gymnasium	3,000	1,386	1,873	776	856	1,533	1,105	1,487	1,424	N/A	2,155†	1,578	2,367	2,017	1,776				20,333	1,564	52%
UT Arlington	College Park Center	7,000	2,466†	1,429	1,475	1,011	1,931	1,419	1,017	1,052	1,663	1,271	1,691	423	1,526	1,905				20,279	1,449	21%
UTRGV	UTRGV Fieldhouse/Bert Ogden Arena	2,500/7,688	678	453	6,674†‡‡	1,355‡‡	865	644	785	517	723	1,121	2,606	1,018	1,837	**2,788**	275	886	1,431	24,656	1,450	58%
Utah Tech	Burns Arena	4,779	2,297	1,133	833	465	442	710	1,256	1,689	1,878	3,962†	1,929	1,306	2,141					20,041	1,542	32%
Utah Valley	UCCU Center	8,500	1,449	2,034	1,389	1,427	1,141	1,911	2,463	2,976	2,827	2,915	1,886	5,168†	2,574	2,267				32,427	2,316	27%
Total		73,523																		471,378	32,514	44%

Bold – At or exceed capacity; capacity ratios for Seattle U and UTRGV computed based on smaller home arena

- †Season high
- ‡Climate Pledge Arena
- ‡‡Bert Ogden Arena
