= 2022–23 Stephen F. Austin Lumberjacks basketball team =

American college basketball season

2022–23 Stephen F. Austin Lumberjacks basketball
- Conference: Western Athletic Conference
- Record: 19–13 (11–7 WAC)
- Head coach: Kyle Keller (7th season)
- Associate head coach: Tony Jasick
- Assistant coaches: Tanner Smith; Dallas Cameron
- Home arena: William R. Johnson Coliseum (Capacity: 7,203)

2022–23 WAC men's basketball standings
	Conf.				Overall
Team	W		L	PCT	W		L	PCT
Utah Valley	15	–	3	.833	28	–	9	.757
Sam Houston	14	–	4	.778	26	–	8	.765
Southern Utah	12	–	6	.667	24	–	13	.649
Grand Canyon †	11	–	7	.611	24	–	12	.667
Seattle	11	–	7	.611	20	–	12	.625
Stephen F. Austin	11	–	7	.611	19	–	13	.594
Tarleton State *	9	–	9	.500	17	–	17	.500
California Baptist	8	–	10	.444	17	–	16	.515
Abilene Christian	7	–	11	.389	13	–	17	.433
UT Rio Grande Valley	6	–	12	.333	15	–	17	.469
UT Arlington	6	–	12	.333	11	–	21	.344
Utah Tech *	5	–	13	.278	14	–	19	.424
New Mexico State **	2	–	16	.111	9	–	15	.375
† Conference tournament winner * Ineligible for the NCAA tournament due to transition from NCAA Division II ** Remaining games as of February 11, 2023 cancelled.

The 2022–23 Stephen F. Austin Lumberjacks basketball team represented Stephen F. Austin State University in the 2022–23 NCAA Division I men's basketball season. The Lumberjacks, led by seventh-year head coach Kyle Keller, played their home games at the William R. Johnson Coliseum in Nacogdoches, Texas as members of the Western Athletic Conference.

== Previous season ==
The Lumberjacks finished the 2021–22 season 22–10, 14–4 in WAC play to finish as WAC regular season co-champions, alongside New Mexico State and Seattle. As the No. 3 seed in the WAC tournament, they were upset by No. 6 seed Abilene Christian in the third round. They were invited to the CBI, where they lost to 2021–22 UNC Asheville Bulldogs men's basketball team in the first round.

== Roster ==
2022–23 Stephen F. Austin Lumberjacks men's basketball team
Players
Coaches

Pos.	#	Name	Height	Weight	Year	Hometown
G	0	Nigel Hawkins	6 ft 4 in (1.93 m)	191 lb (87 kg)	GS	Houston, Texas
G	1	Derrick Tezeno	6 ft 5 in (1.96 m)	205 lb (93 kg)	So	Melville, Louisiana
G	2	Roti Ware	6 ft 3 in (1.91 m)	187 lb (85 kg)	GS	Morton, Mississippi
F	3	Sadaidriene Hall	6 ft 5 in (1.96 m)	200 lb (91 kg)	So	Sulphur Springs, Texas
G	4	Kyle Hayman	6 ft 5 in (1.96 m)	200 lb (91 kg)	Jr	Delhi, Louisiana
G	5	Jaylin Jackson-Posey	6 ft 2 in (1.88 m)	196 lb (89 kg)	So	Midland, Texas
G	10	Latrell Jossell	5 ft 11 in (1.8 m)	175 lb (79 kg)	So	Chicago, Illinois
G	11	DaeVeon Scott	6 ft 3 in (1.91 m)	190 lb (86 kg)	Fr	Fort Worth, Texas
F/C	12	Jalil Beaubrun	6 ft 9 in (2.06 m)	230 lb (104 kg)	Jr	Miami, Florida
G	13	AJ Cajuste	6 ft 1 in (1.85 m)	180 lb (82 kg)	Jr	Boca Raton, Florida
F	14	Cade Walker	6 ft 9 in (2.06 m)	230 lb (104 kg)	Fr	Avinger, Texas
F	15	Robbie Armbrester	6 ft 6 in (1.98 m)	200 lb (91 kg)	So	Atlanta, Georgia
F	22	Nana Antwi-Boasiako	6 ft 9 in (2.06 m)	225 lb (102 kg)	Jr	Nacogdoches, Texas

Head coach

- Kyle Keller (Louisiana Tech)

Assistant coach(es)

- Tony Jasick (Mars Hill)
- Tanner Smith (Clemson)
- Dallas Cameron (Stephen F. Austin)

Legend

- (C) Team captain
- (S) Suspended
- (I) Ineligible
- (W) Walk-on
- Injured
- Current redshirt

Roster
Last update: December 16, 2022

== Schedule and results ==
Date time, TV	Rank^{#}	Opponent^{#}	Result	Record	Site (attendance) city, state
Non-conference regular season
November 7, 2022*; 8:00 pm, ESPN+		LeTourneau	W 93–40	1–0	William R. Johnson Coliseum (2,610); Nacogdoches, TX
November 10, 2022*; 6:30 pm, ESPN+		Gardner–Webb	W 86–71	2–0	William R. Johnson Coliseum (2,049); Nacogdoches, TX
November 15, 2022*; 6:30 pm, ESPN+		Alcorn State	L 60–69	2–1	William R. Johnson Coliseum (2,128); Nacogdoches, TX
November 19, 2022*; 6:00 pm		at South Dakota State	W 93–82	3–1	Frost Arena (2,171); Brookings, SD
November 25, 2022*; 1:00 pm		vs. Quinnipiac; Montreal Northern Classic	L 44–58	3–2	Place Bell; Laval, QC
November 26, 2022*; 3:30 pm		vs. Middle Tennessee; Montreal Northern Classic	L 63–75	3–3	Place Bell; Laval, QC
November 27, 2022*; 9:00 am		vs. UNC Greensboro; Montreal Northern Classic	W 75–58	4–3	Place Bell; Laval, QC
December 1, 2022*; 8:00 pm, ESPN+		Northwestern State	L 96–102	4–4	William R. Johnson Coliseum (2,339); Nacogdoches, TX
December 11, 2022*; 1:00 pm, ESPN+		Paul Quinn	W 103–40	5–4	William R. Johnson Coliseum (2,023); Nacogdoches, TX
December 14, 2022*; 6:00 pm, ESPNU		at Louisiana Tech	W 80–79 ^{OT}	6–4	Thomas Assembly Center (2,469); Ruston, LA
December 17, 2022*; 3:30 pm, Field of 68		at Furman; Greenville Classic	L 70–72	6–5	Bon Secours Wellness Arena (4,117); Greenville, SC
December 19, 2022*; 6:30 pm, ESPN+		North American	W 83–51	7–5	William R. Johnson Coliseum (1,939); Nacogdoches, TX
December 22, 2022*; 2:00 pm, ESPN+		Jackson State	W 80–69	8–5	William R. Johnson Coliseum (1,814); Nacogdoches, TX
WAC regular season
December 29, 2022; 6:30 pm, ESPN+		Abilene Christian	W 75–68	9–5 (1–0)	William R. Johnson Coliseum (2,814); Nacogdoches, TX
December 31, 2022; 1:00 pm, ESPN+		at UT Arlington	W 66–62	10–5 (2–0)	College Park Center (1,419); Arlington, TX
January 4, 2023; 6:30 pm, ESPN+		New Mexico State	W 69–60	11–5 (3–0)	William R. Johnson Coliseum (2,644); Nacogdoches, TX
January 7, 2023; 2:00 pm, ESPN+		Grand Canyon	W 73–68	12–5 (4–0)	William R. Johnson Coliseum (3,286); Nacogdoches, TX
January 12, 2023; 8:00 pm, ESPN+		at Utah Tech	W 85–72	13–5 (5–0)	Burns Arena (1,256); St. George, UT
January 14, 2023; 2:00 pm, ESPN+		at Southern Utah	L 58–67	13–6 (5–1)	America First Event Center (1,583); Cedar City, UT
January 19, 2023; 6:30 pm, ESPN+		at Sam Houston	L 71–76	13–7 (5–2)	Bernard Johnson Coliseum (3,686); Huntsville, TX
January 25, 2023; 6:30 pm, ESPN+		Texas–Rio Grande Valley	W 83–66	14–7 (6–2)	William R. Johnson Coliseum (2,180); Nacogdoches, TX
January 28, 2023; 4:30 pm, ESPN+		Seattle	W 79–65	15–7 (7–2)	William R. Johnson Coliseum (3,303); Nacogdoches, TX
February 1, 2023; 8:00 pm, ESPN+		at New Mexico State	L 67–73	15–8 (7–3)	Pan American Center (5,107); Las Cruces, NM
February 4, 2023; 7:00 pm, ESPN+		at Grand Canyon	L 83–86	15–9 (7–4)	GCU Arena (7,095); Phoenix, AZ
February 11, 2023; 6:30 pm, ESPN+		at Texas–Rio Grande Valley	W 82–72	16–9 (8–4)	UTRGV Fieldhouse (2,788); Edinburg, TX
February 15, 2023; 6:30 pm, ESPN+		Tarleton	W 65–60	17–9 (9–4)	William R. Johnson Coliseum (2,180); Nacogdoches, TX
February 18, 2023; 2:00 pm, ESPN+		UT Arlington	L 70–75	17–10 (9–5)	William R. Johnson Coliseum (3,466); Nacogdoches, TX
February 22, 2023; 7:00 pm, ESPN+		at Abilene Christian	W 91–87 ^{2OT}	18–10 (10–5)	Moody Coliseum (1,844); Abilene, TX
February 26, 2023; 6:00 pm, ESPNU		California Baptist	W 80–58	19–10 (11–5)	William R. Johnson Coliseum (3,554); Nacogdoches, TX
March 1, 2023; 6:30 pm, ESPN+		Sam Houston	L 59–64 ^{OT}	19–11 (11–6)	William R. Johnson Coliseum (4,189); Nacogdoches, TX
March 3, 2023; 7:00 pm, ESPN+		at Utah Valley	L 69–113	19–12 (11–7)	UCCU Center (2,267); Orem, UT
WAC tournament
March 7, 2023; 8:00 pm, ESPN+	(6)	vs. (11) Utah Tech; First round	L 76–80 ^{OT}	19–13	Michelob Ultra Arena; Paradise, NV
*Non-conference game. ^{#}Rankings from AP Poll. (#) Tournament seedings in parentheses. All times are in Central.
