= 2022–23 New Mexico State Aggies men's basketball team =

American college basketball season

2022–23 New Mexico State Aggies men's basketball
- Conference: Western Athletic Conference
- Record: 9–15 (2–16 WAC)
- Head coach: Greg Heiar (1st season)
- Associate head coach: Dominique Taylor
- Assistant coaches: Brian Merritt; Chad Myers
- Home arena: Pan American Center

2022–23 WAC men's basketball standings
	Conf.				Overall
Team	W		L	PCT	W		L	PCT
Utah Valley	15	–	3	.833	28	–	9	.757
Sam Houston	14	–	4	.778	26	–	8	.765
Southern Utah	12	–	6	.667	24	–	13	.649
Grand Canyon †	11	–	7	.611	24	–	12	.667
Seattle	11	–	7	.611	20	–	12	.625
Stephen F. Austin	11	–	7	.611	19	–	13	.594
Tarleton State *	9	–	9	.500	17	–	17	.500
California Baptist	8	–	10	.444	17	–	16	.515
Abilene Christian	7	–	11	.389	13	–	17	.433
UT Rio Grande Valley	6	–	12	.333	15	–	17	.469
UT Arlington	6	–	12	.333	11	–	21	.344
Utah Tech *	5	–	13	.278	14	–	19	.424
New Mexico State **	2	–	16	.111	9	–	15	.375
† Conference tournament winner * Ineligible for the NCAA tournament due to transition from NCAA Division II ** Remaining games as of February 11, 2023 cancelled.

The 2022–23 New Mexico State Aggies men's basketball team represented New Mexico State University in the 2022–23 NCAA Division I men's basketball season. The Aggies were led by first-year head coach Greg Heiar and played their home games at the Pan American Center in Las Cruces, New Mexico as members of the Western Athletic Conference. They finished the season 9–15, 2–16 in Western Athletic Conference play to finish in last place. On February 10, 2023, the school announced the men's basketball program's season would be cancelled based on new reports of violations of university policies. The rest of the team's games were canceled and were deemed forfeits by the WAC. The NCAA does not recognize the forfeited games as part of the team's overall record. They did not take part in the WAC Tournament.

On November 19, 2022, there were reports of a shooting between a student attending the University of New Mexico and a New Mexico State basketball player, leaving the student dead. The basketball player was later identified as Mike Peake, who was wounded on the UNM main campus in Albuquerque. A day later, on November 20, 2022, the New Mexico State Police released details of the shooting, including the arrest of 17-year old Mya Hill. The next day, the New Mexico State Police confirmed a second arrest relating to the shooting, arresting 19-year old Jonathan Smith.

The Aggies and Lobos were slated to renew the Rio Grande Rivalry on the night of the shooting, but the game was postponed. Three days later, both schools decided to cancel the Rio Grande Rivalry for the season due to safety concerns. On December 5, NM State Athletic Director Mario Moccia announced the indefinite suspension of the 21-year old Mike Peake. No charges have been filed against Peake in what was called a "self-defense situation", but there are two investigations surrounding the shooting.

On February 10, New Mexico State University announced the men's basketball program's season would be cancelled based on new reports of violations of university policies. Its entire coaching staff was placed on administrative leave as a result. KTSM reported that the season was suspended because of allegations of hazing by at least three different players multiple times.

On February 14, head coach Greg Heiar was officially fired by NMSU. On March 24, the school named Sam Houston head coach Jason Hooten the team's new head coach.

The season marked the school's last in the Western Athletic Conference. The school joined Conference USA in 2023.

== Previous season ==
The Aggies finished the 2021–22 season 27–7, 14–4 in WAC play to finish in a three-way tie for the regular season championship with Seattle and Stephen F. Austin. As the No. 1 seed in the WAC tournament, they defeated Grand Canyon and Abilene Christian to win the tournament championship. As a result, they received the conference's automatic bid to the NCAA tournament as the No. 12 seed in the West region. There they upset No. 5-seeded UConn in the First Round before losing to No. 4-seeded Arkansas in the Second Round.

== Roster ==
2022–23 New Mexico State Aggies men's basketball team
Players
Coaches

Pos.	#	Name	Height	Weight	Year	Previous school	Hometown
G	0	Anthony Roy	6 ft 5 in (1.96 m)	200 lb (91 kg)	So	Wenatchee Valley College	Oakland, CA
F	1	Marchelus Avery	6 ft 8 in (2.03 m)	215 lb (98 kg)	So	Northwest Florida State	Richmond, VA
F	2	Issa Muhammad	6 ft 9 in (2.06 m)	240 lb (109 kg)	RS Jr	Northwest Florida State	Atlanta, GA
G	3	Xavier Pinson	6 ft 2 in (1.88 m)	175 lb (79 kg)	Sr	LSU	Chicago, IL
F	4	James Beck	6 ft 8 in (2.03 m)	215 lb (98 kg)	RS Sr	Miami (OH)	Grand Rapids, MI
G	5	Kyle Feit	6 ft 4 in (1.93 m)	190 lb (86 kg)	Jr	Indian River State College	Boca Raton, FL
G	11	DaJuan Quaye Gordon	6 ft 5 in (1.96 m)	195 lb (88 kg)	Jr	Missouri	Chicago, IL
F	13	Doctor Bradley	6 ft 8 in (2.03 m)	205 lb (93 kg)	So	Salt Lake CC	Los Angeles, CA
G	14	Shahar Lazar	6 ft 3 in (1.91 m)	200 lb (91 kg)	Fr	Hapoel Tel Aviv Academy	Emunim, Israel
F	15	Mike Peake	6 ft 7 in (2.01 m)	218 lb (99 kg)	Jr	Austin Peay	Chicago, IL
G	21	Ziri Blackwood	6 ft 3 in (1.91 m)	170 lb (77 kg)	So	Western Oklahoma State	Killeen, TX
G	22	Deuce Benjamin	6 ft 1 in (1.85 m)	175 lb (79 kg)	Fr	Las Cruces HS	Las Cruces, NM
F	23	Ethan Anderson	6 ft 9 in (2.06 m)	220 lb (100 kg)	Fr	Farmington HS	Kaysville, UT
F	24	Kim Aiken Jr.	6 ft 7 in (2.01 m)	215 lb (98 kg)	RS Sr	Arizona	Redlands, CA
G	25	Jaden Alexander	6 ft 4 in (1.93 m)	200 lb (91 kg)	Fr	Scotland Campus	Vallejo, CA
F	31	Isaac Shingange	6 ft 5 in (1.96 m)	180 lb (82 kg)	Fr	The Phelps School	New York, NY
F	34	Shakiru Odunewu	6 ft 10 in (2.08 m)	245 lb (111 kg)	RS So	Universal Academy	Providence, RI
F	35	Vuk Vucevic	6 ft 6 in (1.98 m)	190 lb (86 kg)	Fr	Montverde Academy	Paris, France
G	42	Deshawndre Washington	6 ft 7 in (2.01 m)	205 lb (93 kg)	Jr	Northwest Florida State	Chicago, IL

Head coach

- Greg Heiar (Mount St. Clare)

Assistant coach(es)

- Dominique Taylor (East Texas A&M)
- Brian Merritt (Towson)
- Chad Myers (Shepherd)

Legend

- (C) Team captain
- (S) Suspended
- (I) Ineligible
- (W) Walk-on
- Injured
- Current redshirt

Roster
Last update: January 6, 2023

== Schedule and results ==
Date time, TV	Rank^{#}	Opponent^{#}	Result	Record	High points	High rebounds	High assists	Site (attendance) city, state
Exhibition
November 2, 2022*; 7:00 pm, ESPN+/BSAZ		Western New Mexico	W 99–75	–	21 – Washington	8 – Muhammad	9 – Washington	Pan American Center (4,146); Las Cruces, NM
Non-conference regular season
November 7, 2022*; 7:00 pm, ESPN+/BSAZ+		New Mexico Highlands	W 101–52	1–0	20 – Muhammad	10 – Washington	10 – Washington	Pan American Center (5,178); Las Cruces, NM
November 12, 2022*; 7:00 pm, CUSA.tv		at UTEP; Battle of I-10	L 64–67	1–1	20 – Pinson	12 – Washington	4 – Pinson	Don Haskins Center (11,315); El Paso, TX
November 19, 2022*; 5:00 pm, MW Network		at New Mexico; Rio Grande Rivalry	Canceled					The Pit; Albuquerque, NM
November 25, 2022*; 7:30 pm, BeTheBeast		vs. San Diego; Las Vegas Holiday Classic Semifinals	W 90–77	2–1	25 – Pinson	8 – Bradley	9 – Washington	Orleans Arena; Paradise, NV
November 26, 2022*; 7:30 pm, BeTheBeast		vs. UC Irvine; Las Vegas Holiday Classic Championship	L 68–85	2–2	20 – Roy	9 – Gordon	4 – Washington	Orleans Arena; Paradise, NV
November 30, 2022*; 7:00 pm, ESPN+/BSAZ+		UTEP; Battle of I-10	W 95–70	3–2	23 – Roy	8 – 2 Tied	5 – Washington	Pan American Center (6,332); Las Cruces, NM
December 3, 2022*; 7:00 pm, ESPN+/BSAZ+		New Mexico; Rio Grande Rivalry	Canceled					Pan American Center; Las Cruces, NM
December 5, 2022*; 7:00 pm, ESPN+		Simon Fraser	W 77–35	4–2	23 – Odunewu	10 – Odunewu	5 – Washington	Pan American Center (4,346); Las Cruces, NM
December 7, 2022*; 8:00 pm		at Santa Clara	L 65–66	4–3	20 – Washington	8 – Washington	7 – Pinson	Leavey Center (1,039); Santa Clara, CA
December 11, 2022*; 2:00 pm, ESPN+		at Duquesne	W 73–60	5–3	17 – Muhammad	11 – Gordon	6 – Pinson	UPMC Cooper Fieldhouse (1,834); Pittsburgh, PA
December 14, 2022*; 8:00 pm, WCC Network		at Saint Mary's	L 68–81	5–4	20 – Washington	4 – 2 Tied	1 – Pinson	University Credit Union Pavilion (2,844); Moraga, CA
December 18, 2022*; 4:00 pm, ESPN+/BSAZ		Northern New Mexico	W 95–53	6–4	26 – Avery	10 – 2 Tied	7 – Washington	Pan American Center (4,460); Las Cruces, NM
December 21, 2022*; 5:30 pm		vs. Kent State; Sun Bowl Invitational	L 63–73	6–5	17 – Muhammad	10 – Muhammad	4 – Pinson	Don Haskins Center; El Paso, TX
December 22, 2022*; 5:30 pm		vs. North Carolina A&T; Sun Bowl Invitational	W 85–76	7–5	20 – 2 Tied	10 – Avery	6 – Washington	Don Haskins Center (1,225); El Paso, TX
WAC regular season
December 28, 2022; 7:00 pm, ESPN+/BSAZ+		Southern Utah	L 75–79	7–6 (0–1)	18 – Washington	12 – Washington	4 – 2 Tied	Pan American Center (4,942); Las Cruces, NM
December 31, 2022; 4:00 pm, ESPN+/BSAZ		Sam Houston	L 62–75	7–7 (0–2)	12 – 2 Tied	5 – Avery	5 – Washington	Pan American Center (4,705); Las Cruces, NM
January 4, 2023; 5:30 pm, ESPN+		at Stephen F. Austin	L 60–69	7–8 (0–3)	20 – Pinson	10 – Avery	7 – Pinson	William R. Johnson Coliseum (2,644); Nacogdoches, TX
January 7, 2023; 7:00 pm, ESPN+/BSAZ		California Baptist	L 61–70	7–9 (0–4)	20 – Washington	9 – Muhammad	3 – Pinson	Pan American Center (5,092); Las Cruces, NM
January 12, 2023; 8:00 pm, ESPN+		at Seattle	L 66–69	7–10 (0–5)	11 – 2 Tied	7 – 2 Tied	8 – Pinson	Climate Pledge Arena (2,265); Seattle, WA
January 14, 2023; 7:00 pm, ESPN+/BSAZ		UT Arlington	L 55–66	7–11 (0–6)	12 – Pinson	7 – 2 Tied	2 – 2 Tied	Pan American Center (4,864); Las Cruces, NM
January 19, 2023; 4:00 pm, ESPN+		at Southern Utah	L 76–111	7–12 (0–7)	17 – Pinson	4 – 3 Tied	4 – Pinson	America First Event Center (2,093); Cedar City, UT
January 21, 2023; 7:00 pm, ESPN+		at Utah Tech	L 76–89	7–13 (0–8)	20 – Roy	5 – 3 Tied	4 – 2 Tied	Burns Arena (1,878); St. George, UT
January 28, 2023; 2:00 pm, ESPN+		at Utah Valley	L 72–77	7–14 (0–9)	23 – Roy	11 – Washington	5 – Washington	UCCU Center (2,915); Orem, UT
February 1, 2023; 7:00 pm, ESPN+/BSAZ		Stephen F. Austin	W 73–67	8–14 (1–9)	15 – Gordon	11 – Muhammad	6 – Pinson	Pan American Center (5,107); Las Cruces, NM
February 4, 2023; 7:00 pm, ESPN+/BSAZ		Seattle	W 82–75	9–14 (2–9)	15 – Roy	6 – Roy	7 – Pinson	Pan American Center (4,948); Las Cruces, NM
February 8, 2023; 7:00 pm, ESPN+		at Grand Canyon	L 67–78	9–15 (2–10)	22 – Pinson	10 – Washington	5 – Washington	GCU Arena (7,076); Phoenix, AZ
February 11, 2023; 8:00 pm, ESPN+		at California Baptist	L 0–2 Forfeit	9–15 (2–11)	–	–	–	CBU Events Center; Riverside, CA
February 15, 2023; 7:00 pm, ESPN+/BSAZ		Abilene Christian	L 0–2 Forfeit	9–15 (2–12)	–	–	–	Pan American Center; Las Cruces, NM
February 18, 2023; 7:00 pm, ESPN+/BSAZ		Texas–Rio Grande Valley	L 0–2 Forfeit	9–15 (2–13)	–	–	–	Pan American Center; Las Cruces, NM
February 22, 2023; 7:00 pm, ESPN+/BSAZ		Grand Canyon	L 0–2 Forfeit	9–15 (2–14)	–	–	–	Pan American Center; Las Cruces, NM
March 1, 2023; 6:00 pm, ESPN+		at Abilene Christian	L 0–2 Forfeit	9–15 (2–15)	–	–	–	Moody Coliseum; Abilene, TX
March 3, 2023; 6:00 pm, ESPN+		at Tarleton	L 0–2 Forfeit	9–15 (2–16)	–	–	–	Wisdom Gym; Stephenville, TX
*Non-conference game. ^{#}Rankings from AP Poll. (#) Tournament seedings in parentheses. All times are in Mountain.
