= 2022–23 Abilene Christian Wildcats men's basketball team =

American college basketball season

2022–23 Abilene Christian Wildcats men's basketball
- Conference: Western Athletic Conference
- Record: 13–17 (7–11 WAC)
- Head coach: Brette Tanner (2nd season)
- Assistant coaches: Antonio Bostic; Ted Crass; Jon Trilli
- Home arena: Moody Coliseum

2022–23 WAC men's basketball standings
	Conf.				Overall
Team	W		L	PCT	W		L	PCT
Utah Valley	15	–	3	.833	28	–	9	.757
Sam Houston	14	–	4	.778	26	–	8	.765
Southern Utah	12	–	6	.667	24	–	13	.649
Grand Canyon †	11	–	7	.611	24	–	12	.667
Seattle	11	–	7	.611	20	–	12	.625
Stephen F. Austin	11	–	7	.611	19	–	13	.594
Tarleton State *	9	–	9	.500	17	–	17	.500
California Baptist	8	–	10	.444	17	–	16	.515
Abilene Christian	7	–	11	.389	13	–	17	.433
UT Rio Grande Valley	6	–	12	.333	15	–	17	.469
UT Arlington	6	–	12	.333	11	–	21	.344
Utah Tech *	5	–	13	.278	14	–	19	.424
New Mexico State **	2	–	16	.111	9	–	15	.375
† Conference tournament winner * Ineligible for the NCAA tournament due to transition from NCAA Division II ** Remaining games as of February 11, 2023 cancelled.

The 2022–23 Abilene Christian Wildcats men's basketball team represented Abilene Christian University in the 2022–23 NCAA Division I men's basketball season. The Wildcats, led by second-year head coach Brette Tanner, played their home games at Moody Coliseum in Abilene, Texas as members of the Western Athletic Conference (WAC).

The Wildcats finished the season 13–17, 7–11 in WAC play, to finish in ninth place. In the first round of the WAC tournament, they were defeated by California Baptist.

== Previous season ==
The Wildcats finished the 2021–22 season 25–11, 11–7 in WAC play to finish in sixth place. They defeated Utah Valley and upset top seeds Stephen F. Austin and Seattle to advance to the championship game of the WAC tournament. They lost to top-seeded New Mexico State in the title game. They were invited to the CBI, where they defeated Troy and Ohio, before falling to Middle Tennessee in the semifinals.

== Roster ==
2022–23 Abilene Christian Wildcats men's basketball team
Players
Coaches

Pos.	#	Name	Height	Weight	Year	Previous school	Hometown
G	0	Reese Miller	6 ft 3 in (1.91 m)	165 lb (75 kg)	Fr	Round Rock HS	Round Rock, TX
G	1	Damien Daniels	5 ft 7 in (1.7 m)	140 lb (64 kg)	Sr	Hogan Prep	Kansas City, MO
G	2	Ja'Sean Jackson	6 ft 0 in (1.83 m)	170 lb (77 kg)	So	Karen Wagner HS	San Antonio, TX
F	3	Leonardo Bettiol	6 ft 8 in (2.03 m)	214 lb (97 kg)	RS Fr	Liceo Duca degli Abruzzi	Roncade, Italy
G	4	Colby Tanner	5 ft 10 in (1.78 m)	160 lb (73 kg)	RS Fr	Wylie HS	Abilene, TX
F	5	Cameron Steele	6 ft 8 in (2.03 m)	205 lb (93 kg)	Jr	Minnetonka HS	Excelsior, MN
G	10	JV Seat	6 ft 3 in (1.91 m)	240 lb (109 kg)	Fr	Edmond Memorial HS	Edmond, OK
G	11	Tobias Cameron	6 ft 5 in (1.96 m)	210 lb (95 kg)	GS	Hillcrest Christian College	Gold Coast, Australia
G	12	Hunter Jack Madden	6 ft 2 in (1.88 m)	190 lb (86 kg)	Jr	Otero College	Sydney, Australia
G	13	Muodubem Muoneke	6 ft 5 in (1.96 m)	218 lb (99 kg)	Fr	Cypress Ranch HS	Cypress, TX
G	20	Ali Abdou Dibba	6 ft 4 in (1.93 m)	185 lb (84 kg)	So	Chicago State	Stockholm, Sweden
F	23	Airion Simmons	6 ft 5 in (1.96 m)	264 lb (120 kg)	Sr	Parkview Magnet HS	Little Rock, AR
G	25	Immanuel Allen	6 ft 4 in (1.93 m)	215 lb (98 kg)	RS Sr	Butler CC	Phoenix, AZ
F	32	Joe Pleasant	6 ft 7 in (2.01 m)	220 lb (100 kg)	Sr	Blue Valley Northwest HS	Overland Park, KS
F	34	Yuot Gai	6 ft 11 in (2.11 m)	210 lb (95 kg)	Sr	South Plains College	Melbourne, Australia

Head coach

- Brette Tanner (Emporia State)

Assistant coach(es)

- Antonio Bostic (Stephen F. Austin)
- Ted Crass (Little Rock)
- Jon Trilli (Midwestern State)

Legend

- (C) Team captain
- (S) Suspended
- (I) Ineligible
- (W) Walk-on
- Injured
- Current redshirt

Roster
Last update: November 27, 2022

== Schedule and results ==
Date time, TV	Rank^{#}	Opponent^{#}	Result	Record	Site (attendance) city, state
Non-conference regular season
November 7, 2022*; 7:00 p.m., ESPN+		Jackson State	W 65–56	1–0	Moody Coliseum (2,489); Abilene, TX
November 11, 2022*; 7:00 p.m., SECN+/ESPN+		at Texas A&M	L 58–77	1–1	Reed Arena (6,782); College Station, TX
November 15, 2022*; 7:00 p.m., ESPN+		McMurry	W 104–46	2–1	Moody Coliseum (1,643); Abilene, TX
November 21, 2022*; 6:30 p.m., BallerTV		vs. Wright State; Vegas 4	L 61–77	2–2	Dollar Loan Center; Henderson, NV
November 22, 2022*; 6:30 p.m., BallerTV		vs. Weber State; Vegas 4	L 67–77	2–3	Dollar Loan Center; Henderson, NV
November 23, 2022*; 5:30 p.m., BallerTV		vs. UC Riverside; Vegas 4	L 65–76	2–4	Dollar Loan Center; Henderson, NV
November 27, 2022*; 2:00 p.m., ESPN+		at Northern Arizona	W 92–82	3–4	Rolle Activity Center (266); Flagstaff, AZ
November 30, 2022*; 7:00 p.m., ESPN+		North American	W 93–46	4–4	Moody Coliseum (974); Abilene, TX
December 3, 2022*; 2:00 p.m., ESPN+		Arlington Baptist	W 88–42	5–4	Moody Coliseum (747); Abilene, TX
December 6, 2022*; 7:00 p.m., ESPN+		at Kansas State	L 64–81	5–5	Bramlage Coliseum (7,136); Manhattan, KS
December 10, 2022*; 2:00 p.m., ESPN+		Texas A&M–Commerce	W 83–64	6–5	Moody Coliseum (1,204); Abilene, TX
December 17, 2022*; 9:00 p.m., ESPN+		at Cal State Bakersfield	W 65–59	7–5	Icardo Center (1,097); Bakersfield, CA
December 21, 2022*; 6:00 p.m., ESPN+		Howard Payne	W 113–52	8–5	Moody Coliseum (897); Abilene, TX
WAC regular season
December 29, 2022; 6:30 p.m., ESPN+		at Stephen F. Austin	L 68–75	8–6 (0–1)	William R. Johnson Coliseum (2,814); Nacogdoches, TX
December 31, 2022; 3:00 p.m., ESPN+		Tarleton	W 69–63	9–6 (1–1)	Moody Coliseum (1,152); Abilene, TX
January 7, 2023; 6:00 p.m., ESPN+		Southern Utah	L 72–74	9–7 (1–2)	Moody Coliseum (1,122); Abilene, TX
January 11, 2023; 6:30 p.m., ESPN+		at Texas–Rio Grande Valley	L 86–103	9–8 (1–3)	UTRGV Fieldhouse (723); Edinburg, TX
January 14, 2023; 4:00 p.m., ESPN+		at Tarleton	L 63–72	9–9 (1–4)	Wisdom Gym (1,424); Stephenville, TX
January 18, 2023; 7:00 p.m., ESPN+		at Utah Valley	L 54–84	9–10 (1–5)	UCCU Center (2,827); Orem, UT
January 21, 2023; 6:00 p.m., ESPN+		UT Arlington	W 84–68	10–10 (2–5)	Moody Coliseum (2,005); Abilene, TX
January 26, 2023; 7:00 p.m., ESPN+		Grand Canyon	L 73–75	10–11 (2–6)	Moody Coliseum (1,889); Abilene, TX
January 28, 2023; 6:00 p.m., ESPN+		Utah Tech	W 81–76	11–11 (3–6)	Moody Coliseum (1,744); Abilene, TX
February 1, 2023; 9:00 p.m., ESPN+		at Seattle	W 83–68	12–11 (4–6)	Climate Pledge Arena (2,045); Seattle, WA
February 4, 2023; 9:00 p.m., ESPN+		at California Baptist	W 87–71	13–11 (5–6)	CBU Events Center (3,128); Riverside, CA
February 11, 2023; 6:00 p.m., ESPN+		Sam Houston	L 62–77	13–12 (5–7)	Moody Coliseum; Abilene, TX
February 15, 2023; 8:00 p.m., ESPN+		at New Mexico State	W 2–0 Forfeit	13–12 (6–7)	Pan American Center; Las Cruces, NM
February 17, 2023; 10:00 p.m., ESPNU/ESPN+		at Grand Canyon	L 84–94	13–13 (6–8)	GCU Arena (7,438); Phoenix, AZ
February 22, 2023; 7:00 p.m., ESPN+		Stephen F. Austin	L 87–91 ^{2OT}	13–14 (6–9)	Moody Coliseum (1,844); Abilene, TX
February 25, 2023; 6:00 p.m., ESPN+		Utah Valley	L 62–66	13–15 (6–10)	Moody Coliseum (1,951); Abilene, TX
March 1, 2023; 7:00 p.m., ESPN+		New Mexico State	W 2–0 Forfeit	13–15 (7–10)	Moody Coliseum; Abilene, TX
March 3, 2023; 6:30 p.m., ESPN+		at Sam Houston	L 54–72	13–16 (7–11)	Bernard Johnson Coliseum (1,866); Huntsville, TX
WAC tournament
March 7, 2023; 12:00 p.m., ESPN+	(9)	vs. (8) California Baptist; First round	L 62–69	13–17	Michelob Ultra Arena; Paradise, NV
*Non-conference game. ^{#}Rankings from AP poll. (#) Tournament seedings in parentheses. All times are in Central.
