= 2022–23 Seattle Redhawks men's basketball team =

American college basketball season

2022–23 Seattle Redhawks men's basketball
- Conference: Western Athletic Conference
- Record: 20–12 (11–7 WAC)
- Head coach: Chris Victor (2nd season)
- Associate head coach: Alex Pribble
- Assistant coaches: Justin Bradley; D'Marques Tyson
- Home arena: Climate Pledge Arena; Redhawk Center

2022–23 WAC men's basketball standings
	Conf.				Overall
Team	W		L	PCT	W		L	PCT
Utah Valley	15	–	3	.833	28	–	9	.757
Sam Houston	14	–	4	.778	26	–	8	.765
Southern Utah	12	–	6	.667	24	–	13	.649
Grand Canyon †	11	–	7	.611	24	–	12	.667
Seattle	11	–	7	.611	20	–	12	.625
Stephen F. Austin	11	–	7	.611	19	–	13	.594
Tarleton State *	9	–	9	.500	17	–	17	.500
California Baptist	8	–	10	.444	17	–	16	.515
Abilene Christian	7	–	11	.389	13	–	17	.433
UT Rio Grande Valley	6	–	12	.333	15	–	17	.469
UT Arlington	6	–	12	.333	11	–	21	.344
Utah Tech *	5	–	13	.278	14	–	19	.424
New Mexico State **	2	–	16	.111	9	–	15	.375
† Conference tournament winner * Ineligible for the NCAA tournament due to transition from NCAA Division II ** Remaining games as of February 11, 2023 cancelled.

The 2022–23 Seattle Redhawks men's basketball team represented Seattle University in the Western Athletic Conference (WAC) during the 2022–23 NCAA Division I men's basketball season. Led by second-year head coach Chris Victor, the Redhawks played their home games on campus at the Redhawk Center and off campus at Climate Pledge Arena at Seattle Center.

== Previous season ==
The Redhawks finished the 2021–22 season at 23–9 (14–4 in WAC, first) to finish as WAC regular season co-champions, alongside New Mexico State and Stephen F. Austin. As the No. 2 seed, they were upset by No. 6 seed Abilene Christian in the semifinals of the WAC tournament.

== Roster ==
2022–23 Seattle Redhawks men's basketball team
Players
Coaches

Pos.	#	Name	Height	Weight	Year	Hometown
G	0	Alex Schumacher	6 ft 3 in (1.91 m)	185 lb (84 kg)	Jr	Vancouver, Washington
G	1	Vasja Pandža	6 ft 8 in (2.03 m)	210 lb (95 kg)	So	Leeds, England
G	2	Paris Dawson	6 ft 2 in (1.88 m)	170 lb (77 kg)	So	Carson, California
G	5	Cameron Tyson	6 ft 3 in (1.91 m)	190 lb (86 kg)	RS Jr	Bothell, Washington
G	10	Anjaylo Lloyd	6 ft 2 in (1.88 m)	174 lb (79 kg)	Jr	Seattle, Washington
G/F	11	Riley Grigsby	6 ft 6 in (1.98 m)	220 lb (100 kg)	Sr	San Jose, California
G	12	Brody Nunn	6 ft 1 in (1.85 m)	175 lb (79 kg)	RS Fr	Melbourne, Australia
G	13	Dominiq Penn	6 ft 2 in (1.88 m)	170 lb (77 kg)	RS So	Columbus, Ohio
F	14	Louis Grante-Halliday	6 ft 7 in (2.01 m)	215 lb (98 kg)	Fr	London, England
F	15	Emeka Udenyi	6 ft 6 in (1.98 m)	225 lb (102 kg)	Sr	Oakland, California
F	21	Viktor Rajković	6 ft 6 in (1.98 m)	220 lb (100 kg)	So	Mill Valley, California
F	23	Seyi Reiley	6 ft 6 in (1.98 m)	205 lb (93 kg)	Jr	Negril, Jamaica
F	25	Brandton Chatfield	6 ft 10 in (2.08 m)	225 lb (102 kg)	RS So	Orofino, Idaho
G	33	Kobe Williamson	6 ft 8 in (2.03 m)	225 lb (102 kg)	So	Melbourne, Australia
G	35	Matthew Levis	6 ft 1 in (1.85 m)	175 lb (79 kg)	So	Portland, Oregon
G	41	Jaren Nafarrete	5 ft 7 in (1.7 m)	140 lb (64 kg)	RS So	San Diego, California
F	45	Clancy Bird	6 ft 9 in (2.06 m)	200 lb (91 kg)	RS Fr	Sydney, Australia

Head coach

- Chris Victor (Concordia–Irvine)

Assistant coach(es)

- Alex Pribble (California)
- Justin Bradley (Guilford)
- D'Marques Tyson (Portland)

Legend

- (C) Team captain
- (S) Suspended
- (I) Ineligible
- (W) Walk-on
- Injured
- Current redshirt

Roster
Last update: November 2, 2022

== Schedule and results ==
Date time, TV	Rank^{#}	Opponent^{#}	Result	Record	Site (attendance) city, state
Non-conference regular season
November 7, 2022*; 7:00 pm, ESPN+		at UC San Diego	W 85–71	1–0	LionTree Arena (1,386); La Jolla, CA
November 9, 2022*; 7:00 pm, ESPN+		Puget Sound	W 106–55	2–0	Redhawk Center (896); Seattle, WA
November 13, 2022*; 3:00 pm, ESPN+		Portland State	W 83–71	3–0	Redhawk Center (999); Seattle, WA
November 19, 2022*; 5:00 pm		at Portland	W 80–68	4–0	Chiles Center (1,119); Portland, OR
November 23, 2022*; 7:00 pm, ESPN+		Pacific Lutheran	W 89–53	5–0	Redhawk Center (683); Seattle, WA
November 28, 2022*; 7:00 pm, P12N		at Washington	L 66–77	5–1	Alaska Airlines Arena (7,537); Seattle, WA
November 30, 2022*; 7:00 pm, ESPN+		Cal State Fullerton	W 69–62	6–1	Climate Pledge Arena (1,277); Seattle, WA
December 10, 2022*; 1:00 pm, ESPN+		at North Dakota	W 80–78 ^{OT}	7–1	Betty Engelstad Sioux Center (1,524); Grand Forks, ND
December 15, 2022*; 7:30 pm, P12N		at Oregon State	L 58–73	7–2	Gill Coliseum (2,537); Corvallis, OR
December 18, 2022*; 3:00 pm, ESPN+		Alcorn State	W 72–58	8–2	Redhawk Center (780); Seattle, WA
December 22, 2022*; 2:30 pm, ESPNU		vs. Utah State; Diamond Head Classic Quarterfinals	L 56–84	8–3	Stan Sheriff Center (4,333); Honolulu, HI
December 23, 2022*; 1:30 pm, ESPNU		vs. Iona; Diamond Head Classic	L 72–83	8–4	Stan Sheriff Center; Honolulu, HI
December 25, 2022*; 10:30 am, ESPNU		vs. George Washington; Diamond Head Classic 7th Place Game	W 85–67	9–4	Stan Sheriff Center; Honolulu, HI
WAC regular season
December 31, 2022; 3:00 pm, ESPN+		California Baptist	W 71–65	10–4 (1–0)	Redhawk Center (767); Seattle, WA
January 5, 2023; 4:30 pm, ESPN+		at Texas–Rio Grande Valley	W 66-64	11–4 (2–0)	UTRGV Fieldhouse (785); Edinburg, TX
January 7, 2023; 12:00 pm, ESPN+		at UT Arlington	W 76–61	12–4 (3–0)	College Park Center (1,052); Arlington, TX
January 12, 2023; 7:00 pm, ESPN+		New Mexico State	W 69–66	13–4 (4–0)	Climate Pledge Arena (2,265); Seattle, WA
January 14, 2023; 5:00 pm, ESPN+		at Utah Valley	W 85–80	14–4 (5–0)	UCCU Center (2,976); Orem, UT
January 19, 2023; 7:00 pm, ESPN+		Tarleton	W 67–47	15–4 (6–0)	Redhawk Center (901); Seattle, WA
January 21, 2023; 3:00 pm, ESPN+		Southern Utah	W 81–60	16–4 (7–0)	Redhawk Center (928); Seattle, WA
January 26, 2023; 4:30 pm, ESPN+		at Sam Houston	L 40–55	16–5 (7–1)	Bernard Johnson Coliseum (1,845); Huntsville, TX
January 28, 2023; 2:30 pm, ESPN+		at Stephen F. Austin	L 65–79	16–6 (7–2)	William R. Johnson Coliseum (3,303); Nacogdoches, TX
February 1, 2023; 7:00 pm, ESPN+		Abilene Christian	L 68–83	16–7 (7–3)	Climate Pledge Arena (2,045); Seattle, WA
February 4, 2023; 6:00 pm, ESPN+		at New Mexico State	L 75–82	16–8 (7–4)	Pan American Center (4,948); Las Cruces, NM
February 8, 2023; 7:00 pm, ESPN+		Utah Tech	W 75–71	17–8 (8–4)	Climate Pledge Arena (1,565); Seattle, WA
February 11, 2023; 7:00 pm, ESPN+		Grand Canyon	W 63–58	18–8 (9–4)	Redhawk Center (999); Seattle, WA
February 15, 2023; 7:00 pm, ESPN+		at California Baptist	L 63–84	18–9 (9–5)	CBU Events Center (2,225); Riverside, CA
February 18, 2023; 5:00 pm, ESPN+		Utah Valley	L 58–67	18–10 (9–6)	Redhawk Center (999); Seattle, WA
February 24, 2023; 6:00 pm, ESPN+		at Grand Canyon	W 65–54	19–10 (10–6)	GCU Arena (7,414); Phoenix, AZ
March 1, 2023; 6:00 pm, ESPN+		at Utah Tech	L 56–93	19–11 (10–7)	Burns Arena (1,306); St. George, UT
March 3, 2023; 7:00 pm, ESPN+		UT Arlington	W 80–56	20–11 (11–7)	Redhawk Center (1,175); Seattle, WA
WAC tournament
March 9, 2023; 2:00 pm, ESPN+	(4)	vs. (5) Grand Canyon; Quarterfinals	L 79–84	20–12	Orleans Arena (1,760); Paradise, NV
*Non-conference game. ^{#}Rankings from AP Poll. (#) Tournament seedings in parentheses. All times are in Pacific.

A week after the Redhawks' season ended, associate head coach Alex Pribble became the head coach at the University of Idaho in Moscow.
