= 2022–23 California Baptist Lancers men's basketball team =

American college basketball season

2022–23 California Baptist Lancers men's basketball
- Conference: Western Athletic Conference
- Record: 17–16 (8–10 WAC)
- Head coach: Rick Croy (10th season)
- Associate head coach: Hardy Asprilla
- Assistant coaches: Adam Jacobsen; Geoff McIntosh
- Home arena: CBU Events Center

2022–23 WAC men's basketball standings
	Conf.				Overall
Team	W		L	PCT	W		L	PCT
Utah Valley	15	–	3	.833	28	–	9	.757
Sam Houston	14	–	4	.778	26	–	8	.765
Southern Utah	12	–	6	.667	24	–	13	.649
Grand Canyon †	11	–	7	.611	24	–	12	.667
Seattle	11	–	7	.611	20	–	12	.625
Stephen F. Austin	11	–	7	.611	19	–	13	.594
Tarleton State *	9	–	9	.500	17	–	17	.500
California Baptist	8	–	10	.444	17	–	16	.515
Abilene Christian	7	–	11	.389	13	–	17	.433
UT Rio Grande Valley	6	–	12	.333	15	–	17	.469
UT Arlington	6	–	12	.333	11	–	21	.344
Utah Tech *	5	–	13	.278	14	–	19	.424
New Mexico State **	2	–	16	.111	9	–	15	.375
† Conference tournament winner * Ineligible for the NCAA tournament due to transition from NCAA Division II ** Remaining games as of February 11, 2023 cancelled.

The 2022–23 California Baptist Lancers men's basketball team represented California Baptist University in the 2022–23 NCAA Division I men's basketball season. The Lancers, led by tenth-year head coach Rick Croy, played their home games at the CBU Events Center in Riverside, California as members of the Western Athletic Conference (WAC). This was the Lancers' first year as a full D-I member, now making them eligible to qualify for the NCAA tournament. The Lancers finished the season 17–16, 8–10 in WAC play, to finish in eighth place.

== Previous season ==
The Lancers finished the 2021–22 season 18–16, 7–11 in WAC play, to finish in ninth place. In the WAC tournament, they defeated Texas–Rio Grande Valley in the first round, before falling to Sam Houston in the second round. They were invited to the CBI, where they lost in the first round to Middle Tennessee.

== Roster ==
2022–23 California Baptist Lancers men's basketball team
Players
Coaches

Pos.	#	Name	Height	Weight	Year	Hometown
G/F	0	Riley Battin	6 ft 9 in (2.06 m)	240 lb (109 kg)	GS	Westlake Village, CA
G	1	Taran Armstrong	6 ft 6 in (1.98 m)	190 lb (86 kg)	So	Burnie, Australia
G	2	Joe Quintana	6 ft 2 in (1.88 m)	175 lb (79 kg)	GS	Claremont, CA
G	3	Blondeau Tchoukuiegno	6 ft 2 in (1.88 m)	185 lb (84 kg)	So	Montreal, QC
G	5	Reed Nottage	6 ft 7 in (2.01 m)	215 lb (98 kg)	Jr	Sydney, Australia
F	10	Hunter Goodrick	6 ft 7 in (2.01 m)	225 lb (102 kg)	RS So	Sydney, Australia
G	11	Tre Armstrong	6 ft 6 in (1.98 m)	205 lb (93 kg)	Jr	Burnie, Australia
G	12	Scotty Washington	6 ft 4 in (1.93 m)	180 lb (82 kg)	So	Bellflower, CA
G	13	Brady Cook	6 ft 3 in (1.91 m)	185 lb (84 kg)	Fr	Walnut Creek, CA
G	14	Daniel Sykes	6 ft 0 in (1.83 m)	175 lb (79 kg)	Fr	North Richland Hills, TX
G/F	20	Jackson Harding	6 ft 8 in (2.03 m)	190 lb (86 kg)	Fr	Katherine, Australia
F	21	Malik Wade	6 ft 8 in (2.03 m)	235 lb (107 kg)	So	Espírito Santo do Pinhal, Brazil
G	24	Tyler Isaak	6 ft 3 in (1.91 m)	185 lb (84 kg)	Fr	Alamo, CA
F	32	Juhlawnei Stone	6 ft 7 in (2.01 m)	235 lb (107 kg)	So	Lancaster, CA
G	33	Keanu Rasmussen	6 ft 2 in (1.88 m)	185 lb (84 kg)	So	Adelaide, South Australia
F	34	Mikey Frazier	6 ft 10 in (2.08 m)	280 lb (127 kg)	RS Sr	Salt Lake City, UT
C	35	Tim Ighoefe	7 ft 0 in (2.13 m)	255 lb (116 kg)	Jr	Lagos, Nigeria

Head coach

- Rick Croy (Azusa Pacific)

Assistant coach(es)

- Hardy Asprilla (Cal State Fullerton)
- Adam Jacobsen (Pacific)
- Geoff McIntosh (Cal State Monterey Bay)

Legend

- (C) Team captain
- (S) Suspended
- (I) Ineligible
- (W) Walk-on
- Injured
- Current redshirt

Roster
Last update: December 21, 2022

== Schedule and results ==
Date time, TV	Rank^{#}	Opponent^{#}	Result	Record	Site (attendance) city, state
Non-conference regular season
November 7, 2022*; 7:00 p.m., ESPN+		Long Beach State	L 64–79	0–1	CBU Events Center (4,466); Riverside, CA
November 11, 2022*; 7:00 p.m., ESPN+		NJIT	W 59–43	1–1	CBU Events Center (5,050); Riverside, CA
November 15, 2022*; 7:00 p.m., ESPN+		Cal State Northridge; SoCal Challenge campus-site game	W 62–55	2–1	CBU Events Center (2,602); Riverside, CA
November 17, 2022*; 8:00 p.m., P12N		at Washington	W 73–64	3–1	Alaska Airlines Arena (5,666); Seattle, WA
November 21, 2022*; 7:30 p.m., CBSSN		vs. Minnesota; SoCal Challenge Surf Division Semifinals	L 61–62 ^{OT}	3–2	The Pavilion at JSerra (900); San Juan Capistrano, CA
November 23, 2022*; 10:00 p.m., CBSSN		vs. Southern Illinois; SoCal Challenge Surf Division 3rd-place game	L 61–64 ^{OT}	3–3	The Pavilion at JSerra (300); San Juan Capistrano, CA
November 26, 2022*; 5:00 p.m., ESPN+		Central Michigan	W 77–61	4–3	CBU Events Center (2,067); Riverside, CA
November 30, 2022*; 7:00 p.m., ESPN+		UC Riverside	W 65–60	5–3	CBU Events Center (4,038); Riverside, CA
December 3, 2022*; 6:00 p.m., ESPN+		at Cal Poly	L 53–64	5–4	Mott Athletics Center (2,284); San Luis Obispo, CA
December 7, 2022*; 7:00 p.m., ESPN+		Weber State	W 64–52	6–4	CBU Events Center (2,817); Riverside, CA
December 10, 2022*; 7:00 p.m.		at San Diego	W 76–73	7–4	Jenny Craig Pavilion (1,067); San Diego, CA
December 18, 2022*; 7:00 p.m., ESPN+		Sonoma State	W 88–67	8–4	CBU Events Center (2,345); Riverside, CA
December 22, 2022*; 7:00 p.m., ESPN+		Portland State	L 72–74	8–5	CBU Events Center (2,883); Riverside, CA
WAC regular season
December 29, 2022; 5:00 p.m., ESPN+		at Grand Canyon	L 59–73	8–6 (0–1)	GCU Arena (7,316); Phoenix, AZ
December 31, 2022; 3:00 p.m., ESPN+		at Seattle	L 65–71	8–7 (0–2)	Redhawk Center (767); Seattle, WA
January 5, 2023; 7:00 p.m., ESPN+		Utah Tech	W 72–58	9–7 (1–2)	CBU Events Center (2,192); Riverside, CA
January 7, 2023; 6:00 p.m., ESPN+		at New Mexico State	W 70–61	10–7 (2–2)	Pan American Center (5,092); Las Cruces, NM
January 11, 2023; 7:00 p.m., ESPN+		Utah Valley	L 67–71	10–8 (2–3)	CBU Events Center (2,611); Riverside, CA
January 14, 2023; 7:00 p.m., ESPN+		Grand Canyon	W 79–74	11–8 (3–3)	CBU Events Center (5,050); Riverside, CA
January 21, 2023; 7:00 p.m., ESPN+		Tarleton	W 77–48	12–8 (4–3)	CBU Events Center (4,011); Riverside, CA
January 25, 2023; 5:00 p.m., ESPN+		at UT Arlington	W 74–66	13–8 (5–3)	College Park Center (1,271); Arlington, TX
January 28, 2023; 4:30 p.m., ESPN+		at Texas–Rio Grande Valley	L 58–64	13–9 (5–4)	UTRGV Fieldhouse (2,606); Edinburg, TX
February 1, 2023; 7:00 p.m., ESPN+		Southern Utah	L 71–72	13–10 (5–5)	CBU Events Center (2,705); Riverside, CA
February 4, 2023; 7:00 p.m., ESPN+		Abilene Christian	L 71–87	13–11 (5–6)	CBU Events Center (3,128); Riverside, CA
February 8, 2023; 5:00 p.m., ESPN+		at Utah Valley	L 55–71	13–12 (5–7)	UCCU Center (1,886); Orem, UT
February 11, 2023; 7:00 p.m., ESPN+		New Mexico State	W 2–0 Forfeit	13–12 (6–7)	CBU Events Center; Riverside, CA
February 11, 2023*; 8:00 p.m., ESPN+		West Coast Baptist	W 132–46	14–12	CBU Events Center (5,050); Riverside, CA
February 15, 2023; 7:00 p.m., ESPN+		Seattle	W 84–63	15–12 (7–7)	CBU Events Center (2,225); Riverside, CA
February 23, 2023; 4:30 p.m., ESPN+		at Sam Houston	L 45–56	15–13 (7–8)	Bernard Johnson Coliseum (1,613); Huntsville, TX
February 26, 2023; 4:00 p.m., ESPNU		at Stephen F. Austin	L 58–80	15–14 (7–9)	William R. Johnson Coliseum (3,554); Nacogdoches, TX
March 1, 2023; 7:00 p.m., ESPN+		Texas–Rio Grande Valley	W 88–70	16–14 (8–9)	CBU Events Center (3,296); Riverside, CA
March 3, 2023; 6:00 p.m., ESPN+		at Southern Utah	L 71–81	16–15 (8–10)	America First Event Center (1,859); Cedar City, UT
WAC tournament
March 7, 2023; 12:00 p.m., ESPN+	(8)	vs. (9) Abilene Christian; First round	W 69–62	17–15	Michelob Ultra Arena; Paradise, NV
March 9, 2023; 12:00 p.m., ESPN+	(8)	vs. (1) Sam Houston; Quarterfinals	L 51–64	17–16	Michelob Ultra Arena; Paradise, NV
*Non-conference game. ^{#}Rankings from AP poll. (#) Tournament seedings in parentheses. All times are in Pacific.
