= 2022–23 Sam Houston Bearkats men's basketball team =

American college basketball season

2022–23 Sam Houston Bearkats men's basketball
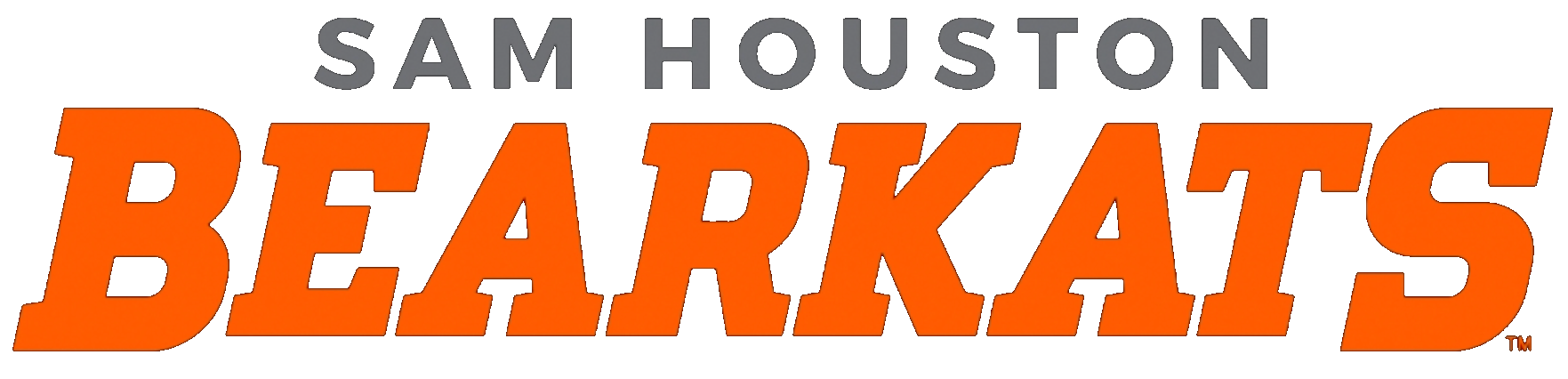

Fort Myers Tip-Off Palms Division champions

NIT, second round
- Conference: Western Athletic Conference
- Record: 26–8 (14–4 WAC)
- Head coach: Jason Hooten (13th season)
- Associate head coach: Chris Mudge (2nd as AHC; 13th overall season)
- Assistant coaches: Justin Bailey (2nd season); Mike Ekanem (1st season)
- Home arena: Bernard Johnson Coliseum

2022–23 WAC men's basketball standings
	Conf.				Overall
Team	W		L	PCT	W		L	PCT
Utah Valley	15	–	3	.833	28	–	9	.757
Sam Houston	14	–	4	.778	26	–	8	.765
Southern Utah	12	–	6	.667	24	–	13	.649
Grand Canyon †	11	–	7	.611	24	–	12	.667
Seattle	11	–	7	.611	20	–	12	.625
Stephen F. Austin	11	–	7	.611	19	–	13	.594
Tarleton State *	9	–	9	.500	17	–	17	.500
California Baptist	8	–	10	.444	17	–	16	.515
Abilene Christian	7	–	11	.389	13	–	17	.433
UT Rio Grande Valley	6	–	12	.333	15	–	17	.469
UT Arlington	6	–	12	.333	11	–	21	.344
Utah Tech *	5	–	13	.278	14	–	19	.424
New Mexico State **	2	–	16	.111	9	–	15	.375
† Conference tournament winner * Ineligible for the NCAA tournament due to transition from NCAA Division II ** Remaining games as of February 11, 2023 cancelled.

The 2022–23 Sam Houston Bearkats men's basketball team represented Sam Houston State University in the 2022–23 NCAA Division I men's basketball season. The Bearkats, led by 13th-year head coach Jason Hooten, played their home games at the Bernard Johnson Coliseum in Huntsville, Texas as second-year members of the Western Athletic Conference (WAC). They finished the season 26–8, 14–4 in WAC play, to finish in second place. They defeated California Baptist in the quarterfinals of the WAC tournament before losing to Grand Canyon in the semifinals. They received an at-large bid to the National Invitation Tournament. There they defeated Santa Clara in the first round before losing to eventual champion North Texas in the second round.

On March 24, 2023, head coach Jason Hooten left the school to take the head coaching position at New Mexico State. On April 3, the school named assistant coach Chris Mudge the team's new head coach.

== Previous season ==
The Bearkats finished the 2021–22 season 19–14, 13–5 in WAC play, to finish in a tie for fourth place. In the WAC tournament, they defeated California Baptist in the second round before falling to Grand Canyon in the third round.

== Roster ==
2022–23 Sam Houston State Bearkats men's basketball team
Players
Coaches

Pos.	#	Name	Height	Weight	Year	Hometown
G	0	Ronald Jr. Mitchell	6 ft 3 in (1.91 m)	180 lb (82 kg)	Jr	Philadelphia, PA
F	1	Kaosi Ezeagu	6 ft 10 in (2.08 m)	255 lb (116 kg)	Jr	Brampton, ON
G	2	Qua Grant	6 ft 1 in (1.85 m)	190 lb (86 kg)	Sr	DeSoto, TX
G	3	Lamar Wilkerson	6 ft 4 in (1.93 m)	205 lb (93 kg)	So	Ashdown, AR
G	4	Anthony Wrzeszcz	6 ft 3 in (1.91 m)	185 lb (84 kg)	Fr	Gdynia, Poland
G	5	Jacoby Bishop	6 ft 2 in (1.88 m)	195 lb (88 kg)	So	New Waverly, TX
G	10	Damon Jr. Nicholas	6 ft 4 in (1.93 m)	195 lb (88 kg)	So	Duncanville, TX
G	11	Javion May	6 ft 2 in (1.88 m)	190 lb (86 kg)	Sr	Chicago, IL
F	12	Tristan Ikpe	6 ft 6 in (1.98 m)	210 lb (95 kg)	Sr	Deer Park, TX
G	13	Jaden Ray	5 ft 10 in (1.78 m)	165 lb (75 kg)	Jr	Midwest City, OK
G	24	Donte Powers	6 ft 2 in (1.88 m)	170 lb (77 kg)	Sr	Starkville, MS
F	25	Cameron Huefner	6 ft 7 in (2.01 m)	210 lb (95 kg)	So	Adelaide, Australia
F/C	33	Giovanni Emejuru	6 ft 10 in (2.08 m)	270 lb (122 kg)	RS Fr	Leicester, England
F	40	Kian Scroggins	6 ft 7 in (2.01 m)	235 lb (107 kg)	So	Raymore, MO

Head coach

- Jason Hooten (Tarleton State)

Assistant coach(es)

- Chris Mudge (Texas)
- Justin Bailey (UT Permian Basin)
- Mike Ekanem (Texas Lutheran)

Legend

- (C) Team captain
- (S) Suspended
- (I) Ineligible
- (W) Walk-on
- Injured
- Current redshirt

Roster
Last update: January 15, 2023

== Schedule and results ==
Date time, TV	Rank^{#}	Opponent^{#}	Result	Record	Site (attendance) city, state
Non-conference regular season
November 7, 2022*; 7:00 p.m., Big 12 Now		at Oklahoma	W 52–51	1–0	Lloyd Noble Center (6,198); Norman, OK
November 10, 2022*; 6:30 p.m., ESPN+		Southwestern Adventist	W 120–33	2–0	Bernard Johnson Coliseum (1,892); Huntsville, TX
November 14, 2022*; 6:30 p.m., ESPN+		LeTourneau	W 84–48	3–0	Bernard Johnson Coliseum (1,320); Huntsville, TX
November 17, 2022*; 8:00 p.m., P12N		at Utah; Fort Myers Tip-Off campus-site game	W 65–55	4–0	Jon M. Huntsman Center (5,503); Salt Lake City, UT
November 22, 2022*; 11:00 a.m.		vs. Northern Illinois; Fort Myers Tip-Off Palms semifinals	W 88–54	5–0	Suncoast Credit Union Arena (244); Fort Myers, FL
November 23, 2022*; 12:30 p.m.		vs. South Dakota; Fort Myers Tip-Off Palms championship	W 80–49	6–0	Suncoast Credit Union Arena (340); Fort Myers, FL
November 28, 2022*; 9:00 p.m., MW Network		at Nevada	L 60–78	6–1	Lawlor Events Center; Reno, NV
December 3, 2022*; 2:00 p.m., ESPN+		Dallas Christian	W 111–58	7–1	Bernard Johnson Coliseum (1,127); Huntsville, TX
December 6, 2022*; 8:00 p.m., ESPNU		at Oklahoma State	L 51–65	7–2	Gallagher-Iba Arena (5,368); Stillwater, OK
December 14, 2022*; 6:30 p.m., ESPN+		at Louisiana–Monroe	W 79–53	8–2	Fant–Ewing Coliseum (871); Monroe, LA
December 17, 2022*; 2:00 p.m., ESPN+		at Texas State	W 69–62	9–2	Strahan Arena (1,329); San Marcos, TX
December 20, 2022*; 4:30 p.m., ESPN+		Arlington Baptist	W 107–26	10–2	Bernard Johnson Coliseum (731); Huntsville, TX
December 22, 2022*; 7:00 p.m., ESPN+		at Missouri State	Canceled		Great Southern Bank Arena; Springfield, MO
WAC regular season
December 29, 2022; 7:00 p.m., ESPN+		at Utah Valley	L 64–80	10–3 (0–1)	UCCU Center (1,911); Orem, UT
December 31, 2022; 5:00 p.m., ESPN+		at New Mexico State	W 75–62	11–3 (1–1)	Pan American Center (4,705); Las Cruces, NM
January 5, 2023; 6:30 p.m., ESPN+		Grand Canyon	L 68–72 ^{OT}	11–4 (1–2)	Bernard Johnson Coliseum (777); Huntsville, TX
January 7, 2023; 4:30 p.m., ESPN+		Tarleton	W 75–68	12–4 (2–2)	Bernard Johnson Coliseum (1,702); Huntsville, TX
January 12, 2023; 8:00 p.m., ESPN+		at Southern Utah	L 74–86	12–5 (2–3)	America First Event Center (2,178); Cedar City, UT
January 14, 2023; 8:00 p.m., ESPN+		at Utah Tech	W 78–53	13–5 (3–3)	Burns Arena (1,689); St. George, UT
January 19, 2023; 6:30 p.m., ESPN+		Stephen F. Austin	W 76–71	14–5 (4–3)	Bernard Johnson Coliseum (3,686); Huntsville, TX
January 21, 2023; 4:30 p.m., ESPN+		Texas–Rio Grande Valley	W 83–64	15–5 (5–3)	Bernard Johnson Coliseum (1,674); Huntsville, TX
January 26, 2023; 7:30 p.m., ESPN+		Seattle	W 55–40	16–5 (6–3)	Bernard Johnson Coliseum (1,845); Huntsville, TX
February 1, 2023; 6:30 p.m., ESPN+		at Texas–Rio Grande Valley	W 67-65	17-5 (7-3)	UTRGV Fieldhouse (1,018); Edinburg, TX
February 4, 2023; 4:00 p.m., ESPN+		at UT Arlington	L 58–70	17–6 (7–4)	College Park Center (1,691); Arlington, TX
February 11, 2023; 6:00 p.m., ESPN+		at Abilene Christian	W 77–62	18–6 (8–4)	Moody Coliseum; Abilene, TX
February 15, 2023; 6:30 p.m., ESPN+		UT Arlington	W 66–56	19–6 (9–4)	Bernard Johnson Coliseum (1,332); Huntsville, TX
February 18, 2023; 7:00 p.m., ESPN+		at Tarleton	W 64–59	20–6 (10–4)	Wisdom Gym (2,367); Stephenville, TX
February 23, 2023; 6:30 p.m., ESPN+		California Baptist	W 56–45	21–6 (11–4)	Bernard Johnson Coliseum (1,613); Huntsville, TX
February 25, 2023; 4:30 p.m., ESPN+		Southern Utah	W 64–57	22–6 (12–4)	Bernard Johnson Coliseum (1,772); Huntsville, TX
March 1, 2023; 6:30 p.m., ESPN+		at Stephen F. Austin	W 64–59 ^{OT}	23–6 (13–4)	William R. Johnson Coliseum (4,189); Nacogdoches, TX
March 3, 2023; 6:30 p.m., ESPN+		Abilene Christian	W 72–54	24–6 (14–4)	Bernard Johnson Coliseum (1,866); Huntsville, TX
WAC tournament
March 9, 2023; 12:00 p.m., ESPN+	(1)	vs. (8) California Baptist; Quarterfinals	W 64–51	25–6	Orleans Arena; Paradise, NV
March 10, 2023; 6:00 p.m., ESPN+	(1)	vs. (5) Grand Canyon; Semifinals	L 75–78	25–7	Orleans Arena; Paradise, NV
NIT
March 15, 2023*; 8:00 p.m., ESPN+	(3)	at Santa Clara; First round – Oklahoma State Bracket	W 58–56	26–7	Leavey Center (1,203); Santa Clara, CA
March 19, 2023; 3:00 p.m., ESPN+	(3)	at (2) North Texas; Second round – Oklahoma State Bracket	L 55–75	26–8	The Super Pit (3,130); Denton, TX
*Non-conference game. ^{#}Rankings from AP poll. (#) Tournament seedings in parentheses. All times are in Central.
