= 2022–23 Grand Canyon Antelopes men's basketball team =

American college basketball season

2022–23 Grand Canyon Antelopes men's basketball

WAC tournament champions

NCAA tournament, First Round
- Conference: Western Athletic Conference
- Record: 24–12 (11–7 WAC)
- Head coach: Bryce Drew (3rd season)
- Assistant coaches: Jamall Walker; Ed Schilling; Casey Shaw
- Home arena: GCU Arena

2022–23 WAC men's basketball standings
	Conf.				Overall
Team	W		L	PCT	W		L	PCT
Utah Valley	15	–	3	.833	28	–	9	.757
Sam Houston	14	–	4	.778	26	–	8	.765
Southern Utah	12	–	6	.667	24	–	13	.649
Grand Canyon †	11	–	7	.611	24	–	12	.667
Seattle	11	–	7	.611	20	–	12	.625
Stephen F. Austin	11	–	7	.611	19	–	13	.594
Tarleton State *	9	–	9	.500	17	–	17	.500
California Baptist	8	–	10	.444	17	–	16	.515
Abilene Christian	7	–	11	.389	13	–	17	.433
UT Rio Grande Valley	6	–	12	.333	15	–	17	.469
UT Arlington	6	–	12	.333	11	–	21	.344
Utah Tech *	5	–	13	.278	14	–	19	.424
New Mexico State **	2	–	16	.111	9	–	15	.375
† Conference tournament winner * Ineligible for the NCAA tournament due to transition from NCAA Division II ** Remaining games as of February 11, 2023 cancelled.

The 2022–23 Grand Canyon Antelopes men's basketball team represented Grand Canyon University during the 2022–23 NCAA Division I men's basketball season. They were led by head coach Bryce Drew in his third season. The Antelopes play their home games at GCU Arena in Phoenix, Arizona as members of the Western Athletic Conference. They finished the season 24–12, 11–7 in WAC Play to finish in a three-way tie for fourth place. They defeated UT Arlington, Seattle U, Sam Houston, and Southern Utah to win the WAC tournament. They received the conference's automatic bid to the NCAA tournament where they lost in the first round to Gonzaga.

== Previous season ==
The 2021–22 Antelopes finished fourth in the WAC regular season and lost in the semifinals of the 2022 WAC men's basketball tournament.

== Roster ==
2022–23 Grand Canyon Antelopes men's basketball team
Players
Coaches

Pos.	#	Name	Height	Weight	Year	Hometown
G	0	Ray Harrison	6 ft 4 in (1.93 m)	194 lb (88 kg)	So	Greenville, South Carolina
F	1	Derrick Michael Xzavierro	6 ft 10 in (2.08 m)	220 lb (100 kg)	Fr	Jakarta, Indonesia
G	2	Chance McMillian	6 ft 3 in (1.91 m)	185 lb (84 kg)	So	Vallejo, California
G	3	Kobe Knox	6 ft 5 in (1.96 m)	195 lb (88 kg)	RS Fr	Tampa, Florida
G	10	Jovan Blacksher Jr.	5 ft 11 in (1.8 m)	165 lb (75 kg)	Jr	Oakland, California
F	13	Aidan Igiehon	6 ft 10 in (2.08 m)	250 lb (113 kg)	Jr	Dublin, Ireland
F	20	Noah Baumann	6 ft 6 in (1.98 m)	210 lb (95 kg)	GS	Phoenix, Arizona
F	21	Logan Landers	6 ft 9 in (2.06 m)	225 lb (102 kg)	So	Cedarburg, Wisconsin
G	22	Josh Baker	6 ft 4 in (1.93 m)	185 lb (84 kg)	Jr	Phoenix, Arizona
F	23	Isaiah Carr	7 ft 0 in (2.13 m)	240 lb (109 kg)	Fr	Las Cruces, New Mexico
F	24	Yvan Ouedraogo	6 ft 9 in (2.06 m)	250 lb (113 kg)	Jr	Bordeaux, France
F	30	Gabe McGlothan	6 ft 7 in (2.01 m)	235 lb (107 kg)	RS Jr	Gilbert, Arizona
G	33	Isaiah Shaw	6 ft 7 in (2.01 m)	200 lb (91 kg)	RS Fr	Rome, Italy
G	55	Walter Ellis	6 ft 5 in (1.96 m)	200 lb (91 kg)	Sr	Granger, Indiana

Head coach

- Bryce Drew (Valparaiso)

Assistant coach(es)

- Jamall Walker (Saint Louis)
- Ed Schilling (Miami (OH))
- Casey Shaw (Toledo)

Legend

- (C) Team captain
- (S) Suspended
- (I) Ineligible
- (W) Walk-on
- Injured
- Current redshirt

Roster
Last update: December 18, 2022

== Schedule and results ==
Date time, TV	Rank^{#}	Opponent^{#}	Result	Record	Site (attendance) city, state
Exhibition
October 28, 2022*; 7:00 pm, Fox 10 Xtra/ESPN+		Eastern New Mexico	W 71–43	–	GCU Arena (7,319); Phoenix, AZ
Non-conference regular season
November 7, 2022*; 7:00 pm, Fox 10 Xtra/ESPN+		Montana State	W 60–54	1–0	GCU Arena (7,171); Phoenix, AZ
November 9, 2022*; 7:00 pm, Fox 10 Xtra/ESPN+		San Diego Christian	W 101–50	2–0	GCU Arena (6,891); Phoenix, AZ
November 12, 2022*; 2:00 pm, Mountain West Network		at Nevada	L 46–59	2–1	Lawlor Events Center (5,705); Reno, NV
November 18, 2022*; 7:00 pm, Fox 10 Xtra/ESPN+		Grambling	W 81–48	3–1	GCU Arena (7,166); Phoenix, AZ
November 21, 2022*; 1:00 pm, CBS Sports Network		vs. Wichita State; Hall of Fame Classic	L 43–55	3–2	T-Mobile Center (425); Kansas City, MO
November 22, 2022*; 9:30 am, CBS Sports Network		vs. Northern Iowa; Hall of Fame Classic consolation game	W 69–67	4–2	T-Mobile Center (201); Kansas City, MO
November 26, 2022*; 6:00 pm, Fox 10 Xtra/ESPN+		Benedictine Mesa	W 110–53	5–2	GCU Arena (6,873); Phoenix, AZ
November 29, 2022*; 7:00 pm, Fox 10 Xtra/ESPN+		Alcorn State	W 80–72	6–2	GCU Arena (6,713); Phoenix, AZ
December 3, 2022*; 2:00 pm, Mountain West Network		at Wyoming	W 66–58	7–2	Arena-Auditorium (4,472); Laramie, WY
December 7, 2022*; 7:00 pm, Fox 10 Xtra/ESPN+		Loyola Marymount	L 65–69	7–3	GCU Arena (7,011); Phoenix, AZ
December 10, 2022*; 3:30 pm, ESPN+		vs. North Texas; Jerry Colangelo Classic	L 58–60	7–4	Footprint Center (4,781); Phoenix, AZ
December 17, 2022*; 6:00 pm, Fox 10 Xtra/ESPN+		Pepperdine	W 83–73 ^{OT}	8–4	GCU Arena (7,072); Phoenix, AZ
December 20, 2022*; 6:00 pm, Fox 10 Xtra/ESPN+		Idaho State	W 68–66	9–4	GCU Arena (6,804); Phoenix, AZ
December 29, 2022; 6:00 pm, Fox 10 Xtra/ESPN+		California Baptist	W 73–59	10–4 (1–0)	GCU Arena (7,316); Phoenix, AZ
January 5, 2023; 5:30 pm, ESPN+		at Sam Houston	W 72–68 ^{OT}	11–4 (2–0)	Bernard Johnson Coliseum (777); Huntsville, TX
January 7, 2023; 1:00 pm, ESPN+		at Stephen F. Austin	L 68–73	11–5 (2–1)	William R. Johnson Coliseum (3,286); Nacogdoches, TX
January 12, 2023; 7:00 pm, Fox 10 Xtra/ESPN+		UT Arlington	W 80–48	12–5 (3–1)	GCU Arena (6,982); Phoenix, AZ
January 14, 2023; 8:00 pm, ESPN+		at California Baptist	L 74–79	12–6 (3–2)	CBU Events Center (5,050); Riverside, CA
January 18, 2023; 7:00 pm, Fox 10 Xtra/ESPN+		Utah Tech	W 89–85	13–6 (4–2)	GCU Arena (6,041); Phoenix, AZ
January 21, 2023; 6:00 pm, Fox 10 Xtra/ESPN+		Utah Valley	L 74–76	13–7 (4–3)	GCU Arena (7,007); Phoenix, AZ
January 26, 2023; 6:00 pm, ESPN+		at Abilene Christian	W 75–73	14–7 (5–3)	Moody Coliseum (1,889); Abilene, TX
January 28, 2023; 6:00 pm, ESPN+		at Tarleton	L 62–81	14–8 (5–4)	Wisdom Gymnasium (2,155); Stephenville, TX
February 4, 2023; 6:00 pm, Fox 10 Xtra/ESPN+		Stephen F. Austin	W 86–83	15–8 (6–4)	GCU Arena (7,095); Phoenix, AZ
February 8, 2023; 7:00 pm, Fox 10 Xtra/ESPN+		New Mexico State	W 78–67	16–8 (7–4)	GCU Arena (7,076); Phoenix, AZ
February 11, 2023; 8:00 pm, ESPN+		at Seattle U	L 58–63	16–9 (7–5)	Redhawk Center (999); Seattle, WA
February 15, 2023; 7:00 pm, Fox 10 Xtra/ESPN+		UT Rio Grande Valley	L 76–77	16–10 (7–6)	GCU Arena (6,039); Phoenix, AZ
February 17, 2023; 9:00 pm, ESPNU		Abilene Christian	W 94–84	17–10 (8–6)	GCU Arena (7,438); Phoenix, AZ
February 22, 2023; 7:00 pm, ESPN+		at New Mexico State	W 2–0 Forfeit	18–10 (9–6)	Pan American Center; Las Cruces, NM
February 24, 2023; 7:00 pm, Fox 10 Xtra/ESPN+		Seattle U	L 54–65	18–11 (9–7)	GCU Arena (7,414); Phoenix, AZ
March 1, 2023; 7:00 pm, ESPN+		at Southern Utah	W 83–78	19–11 (10–7)	America First Event Center (1,460); Cedar City, UT
March 3, 2023; 7:00 pm, ESPN+		at Utah Tech	W 71–61	20–11 (11–7)	Burns Arena (2,141); St. George, UT
WAC tournament
March 7, 2023; 2:00 pm, ESPN+	(5)	vs. (12) UT Arlington; First round	W 82–77	21–11	Michelob Ultra Arena (785); Paradise, NV
March 9, 2023; 2:00 pm, ESPN+	(5)	vs. (4) Seattle; Quarterfinals	W 84–79	22–11	Orleans Arena; Paradise, NV
March 10, 2023; 6:00 pm, ESPN+	(5)	vs. (1) Sam Houston; Semifinals	W 78–75	23–11	Orleans Arena; Paradise, NV
March 11, 2023; 8:30 pm, ESPN2	(5)	vs. (3) Southern Utah; Championship	W 84–66	24–11	Orleans Arena; Paradise, NV
NCAA tournament
March 17, 2023*; 4:35 pm, TruTV	(14 W)	vs. (3 W) No. 9 Gonzaga; First Round	L 70–82	24–12	Ball Arena; Denver, CO
*Non-conference game. ^{#}Rankings from AP Poll. (#) Tournament seedings in parentheses. W=West. All times are in Mountain Time.

== See also ==
2022–23 Grand Canyon Antelopes women's basketball team
