= 2022–23 Alcorn State Braves basketball team =

American college basketball season

2022–23 Alcorn State Braves basketball
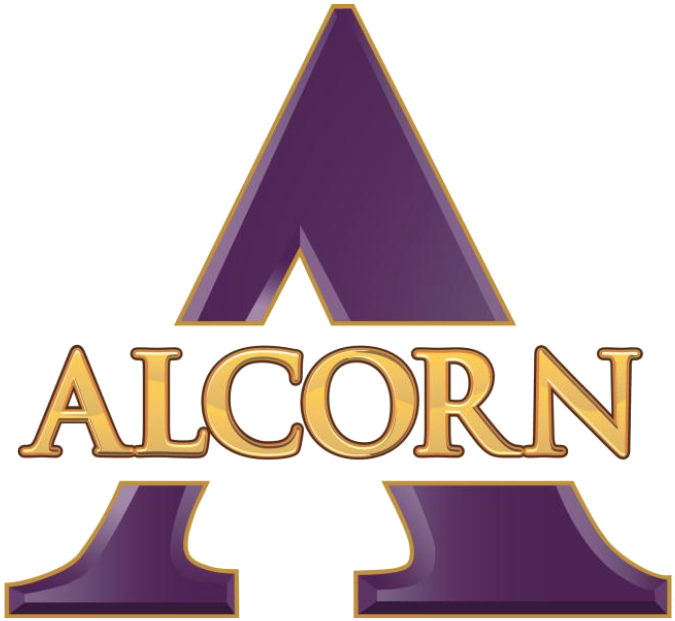

SWAC regular-season co-champions

NIT, first round
- Conference: Southwestern Athletic Conference
- Record: 18–14 (15–3 SWAC)
- Head coach: Landon Bussie (3rd season)
- Assistant coaches: Cy Alexander; Gary Smith; Benjamin Mandelbaum
- Home arena: Davey Whitney Complex

2022–23 SWAC men's basketball standings
	Conf.				Overall
Team	W		L	PCT	W		L	PCT
Alcorn State	15	–	3	.833	18	–	14	.563
Grambling State	15	–	3	.833	24	–	9	.727
Jackson State	12	–	6	.667	14	–	19	.424
Southern	11	–	7	.611	15	–	17	.469
Alabama A&M	10	–	8	.556	15	–	18	.455
Prairie View A&M	9	–	9	.500	13	–	19	.406
Bethune–Cookman	8	–	10	.444	12	–	20	.375
Texas Southern †	7	–	11	.389	14	–	21	.400
Alabama State	6	–	12	.333	8	–	23	.258
Arkansas–Pine Bluff	6	–	12	.333	10	–	21	.323
Florida A&M	5	–	13	.278	7	–	22	.241
Mississippi Valley State	4	–	14	.222	5	–	27	.156
† 2023 SWAC tournament winner

The 2022–23 Alcorn State Braves basketball team represented Alcorn State University in the 2022–23 NCAA Division I men's basketball season. The Braves, led by third-year head coach Landon Bussie, played their home games at the Davey Whitney Complex in Lorman, Mississippi as members of the Southwestern Athletic Conference (SWAC).

== Previous season ==
The Braves finished the 2021–22 season 17–17, 14–4 in SWAC play, to finish as SWAC regular-season champions. In the SWAC tournament, they defeated Prairie View A&M and Alabama A&M, before falling to Texas Southern in the SWAC championship game. As a regular-season conference champion who failed to win their conference tournament title, they received an automatic bid to the NIT, where they lost in the first round to Texas A&M.

== Roster ==
2022–23 Alcorn State Braves men's basketball team
Players
Coaches

Pos.	#	Name	Height	Weight	Year	Hometown
F/C	1	Dontrell McQuarter	6 ft 7 in (2.01 m)	190 lb (86 kg)	Sr	Baton Rouge, LA
G	2	Byron Joshua	5 ft 11 in (1.8 m)	165 lb (75 kg)	So	New Orleans, LA
G	3	Trevin Wade	5 ft 11 in (1.8 m)	175 lb (79 kg)	GS	Marietta, GA
G	4	Devin Carter	6 ft 2 in (1.88 m)	160 lb (73 kg)	RS Fr	Edwards, MS
F/C	5	Keondre Montgomery	6 ft 7 in (2.01 m)	200 lb (91 kg)	RS So	Jackson, MS
G	10	Mike Pajeaud	6 ft 1 in (1.85 m)	180 lb (82 kg)	So	New Orleans, LA
G	11	Oddyst Walker	6 ft 2 in (1.88 m)	185 lb (84 kg)	Sr	Baton Rouge, LA
F	12	Dekedran Thorn	6 ft 4 in (1.93 m)	190 lb (86 kg)	Jr	Houston, TX
F	13	Jeremiah Kendall	6 ft 6 in (1.98 m)	205 lb (93 kg)	Jr	The Bronx, NY
G	15	Willie Anderson	6 ft 4 in (1.93 m)	185 lb (84 kg)	Fr	New Orleans, LA
F	20	Darryl Jordan	6 ft 7 in (2.01 m)	210 lb (95 kg)	GS	Hattiesburg, MS
F/C	21	D'Andre Dues	6 ft 8 in (2.03 m)	200 lb (91 kg)	RS So	Houston, TX
G	22	Cameron Butler	6 ft 0 in (1.83 m)	175 lb (79 kg)	RS So	Vicksburg, MS
G	23	Dominic Brewton	6 ft 4 in (1.93 m)	195 lb (88 kg)	So	Cincinnati, OH
G/F	24	Gregory Crawford	6 ft 5 in (1.96 m)	200 lb (91 kg)	RS So	Houston, TX
F/C	32	Ladarius Marshall	6 ft 7 in (2.01 m)	225 lb (102 kg)	Sr	Jackson, MS
F	34	Shaun Walker	6 ft 8 in (2.03 m)	275 lb (125 kg)	RS Fr	Houston, TX

Head coach

- Landon Bussie (XULA)

Assistant coach(es)

- Cy Alexander (Catawba)
- Gary Smith (XULA)
- Benjamin Mandelbaum (Minnesota)

Legend

- (C) Team captain
- (S) Suspended
- (I) Ineligible
- (W) Walk-on
- Injured
- Current redshirt

Roster
Last update: January 13, 2023

== Schedule and results ==
Date time, TV	Rank^{#}	Opponent^{#}	Result	Record	High points	High rebounds	High assists	Site (attendance) city, state
Exhibition
October 27, 2022*; 6:30 p.m.		Tougaloo	W 77–63	–	20 – Montgomery	12 – Montgomery	4 – Wade	Davey Whitney Complex; Lorman, MS
Non-conference regular season
November 7, 2022*; 8:00 p.m., ESPN+		at Ole Miss	L 58–73	0–1	15 – Joshua	7 – Montgomery	6 – Joshua	SJB Pavilion (5,990); Oxford, MS
November 12, 2022*; 3:00 p.m., ESPN+		at Wichita State	W 66–57	1–1	14 – Wade	7 – Montgomery	3 – McQuarter	Charles Koch Arena (8,515); Wichita, KS
November 15, 2022*; 6:30 p.m., ESPN+		at Stephen F. Austin	W 69–60	2–1	14 – Brewton	8 – Kendall	4 – Wade	William R. Johnson Coliseum (2,128); Nacogdoches, TX
November 22, 2022*; 8:00 p.m., CUSA.tv		at UTEP; Jim Forbes Classic	L 61–73 ^{2OT}	2–2	17 – Brewton	9 – Joshua	4 – Brewton	Don Haskins Center (4,073); El Paso, TX
November 23, 2022*; 5:00 p.m.		vs. Texas A&M–Corpus Christi; Jim Forbes Classic	L 67–98	2–3	16 – Carter	7 – Walker	4 – Pajeaud	Don Haskins Center; El Paso, TX
November 25, 2022*; 12:00 p.m.		vs. Cal State Bakersfield; Jim Forbes Classic	W 62–54	3–3	16 – Brewton	7 – Brewton	4 – Joshua	Don Haskins Center; El Paso, TX
November 27, 2022*; 4:00 p.m., P12N		at Arizona State	L 54–76	3–4	19 – Thorn	10 – Kendall	4 – Joshua	Desert Financial Arena (5,263); Tempe, AZ
November 29, 2022*; 8:00 p.m., ESPN+		at Grand Canyon	L 72–80	3–5	30 – Joshua	8 – Kendall	3 – 2 tied	GCU Arena (6,713); Phoenix, AZ
December 4, 2022*; 5:00 p.m., SECN+/ESPN+		at No. 13 Tennessee	L 40–94	3–6	10 – Brewton	4 – Jordan	2 – Pajeaud	Thompson–Boling Arena (16,481); Knoxville, TN
December 10, 2022*; 7:00 p.m., ESPN3		at Southern Illinois	L 68–74	3–7	20 – Brewton	7 – Kendall	3 – Thorn	Banterra Center (4,121); Carbondale, IL
December 18, 2022*; 5:00 p.m., ESPN+		at Seattle	L 58–72	3–8	19 – Kendall	12 – Kendall	2 – Joshua	Redhawk Center (780); Seattle, WA
December 20, 2022*; 6:00 p.m., ESPN+		at Dayton	L 46–88	3–9	11 – Montgomery	10 – Marshall	2 – 3 tied	UD Arena (13,407); Dayton, OH
December 29, 2022*; 7:00 p.m., BTN+		at Minnesota	Canceled due to travel-related complications					Williams Arena; Minneapolis, MN
SWAC regular season
January 2, 2023; 4:00 p.m.		Jackson State	L 66–67	3–10 (0–1)	18 – Montgomery	10 – McQuarter	4 – Joshua	Davey Whitney Complex (4,721); Lorman, MS
January 7, 2023; 4:00 p.m.		Alabama A&M	W 89–76	4–10 (1–1)	24 – Montgomery	8 – Kendall	4 – Joshua	Davey Whitney Complex (1,150); Lorman, MS
January 9, 2023; 4:00 p.m.		Alabama State	W 92–76	5–10 (2–1)	23 – Montgomery	8 – 2 tied	6 – Joshua	Davey Whitney Complex (560); Lorman, MS
January 14, 2023; 5:00 p.m.		at Texas Southern	W 79–74 ^{OT}	6–10 (3–1)	26 – Brewton	8 – 2 tied	3 – 2 tied	H&PE Arena (1,840); Houston, TX
January 16, 2023; 8:00 p.m., ESPNU		at Prairie View A&M	W 77–68 ^{OT}	7–10 (4–1)	20 – Brewton	14 – Kendall	4 – Joshua	William Nicks Building (1,206); Prairie View, TX
January 21, 2023; 4:00 p.m.		Florida A&M	W 57–47	8–10 (5–1)	13 – Brewton	6 – Walker	4 – Joshua	Davey Whitney Complex (3,356); Lorman, MS
January 23, 2023; 7:00 p.m.		Bethune–Cookman	W 76–68	9–10 (6–1)	20 – McQuarter	10 – Kendall	8 – Joshua	Davey Whitney Complex (3,100); Lorman, MS
January 28, 2023; 5:30 p.m.		at Southern	L 68–80	9–11 (6–2)	15 – Joshua	8 – Kendall	3 – Joshua	F. G. Clark Center (5,978); Baton Rouge, LA
January 30, 2023; 7:00 p.m.		at Grambling State	W 63–60	10–11 (7–2)	16 – Brewton	9 – Kendall	4 – Joshua	Fredrick C. Hobdy Assembly Center (1,407); Grambling, LA
February 4, 2023; 4:00 p.m.		Arkansas–Pine Bluff	W 70–67	11–11 (8–2)	18 – Kendall	7 – 2 tied	4 – Joshua	Davey Whitney Complex; Lorman, MS
February 6, 2023; 8:00 p.m., HBCU GO		Mississippi Valley State	W 81–70	12–11 (9–2)	20 – Montgomery	10 – Montgomery	9 – Joshua	Davey Whitney Complex (3,900); Lorman, MS
February 11, 2023; 4:00 p.m.		at Bethune–Cookman	W 76–74	13–11 (10–2)	15 – 2 tied	8 – Marshall	8 – Joshua	Moore Gymnasium (956); Daytona Beach, FL
February 13, 2023; 6:30 p.m.		at Florida A&M	W 67–64	14–11 (11–2)	17 – Joshua	7 – Kendall	4 – Joshua	Al Lawson Center (1,443); Tallahassee, FL
February 18, 2023; 3:00 p.m., HBCU GO		at Jackson State	W 75–60	15–11 (12–2)	19 – Thorn	5 – Thorn	14 – Joshua	Williams Assembly Center (1,325); Jackson, MS
February 25, 2023; 4:00 p.m.		Prairie View A&M	L 71–75	15–12 (12–3)	18 – Kendall	10 – Kendall	4 – Joshua	Davey Whitney Complex (3,809); Lorman, MS
February 27, 2023; 8:00 p.m., HBCU GO		Texas Southern	W 89–81	16–12 (13–3)	33 – Kendall	6 – tied	3 – tied	Davey Whitney Complex (956); Lorman, MS
March 2, 2023; 7:30 p.m.		at Mississippi Valley State	W 70–60	17–12 (14–3)	17 – Thorn	6 – tied	5 – Joshua	Harrison HPER Complex (1,309); Itta Bena, MS
March 4, 2023; 5:30 p.m.		at Arkansas–Pine Bluff	W 63–58	18–12 (15–3)	23 – Joshua	8 – Montgomery	3 – Joshua	H.O. Clemmons Arena (1,754); Pine Bluff, AR
SWAC tournament
March 8, 2022; 8:30 p.m., ESPN+	(1)	vs. (8) Texas Southern; Quarterfinals	L 62–66	18–13	21 – Joshua	10 – Joshua	6 – Joshua	Bartow Arena (807); Birmingham, AL
NIT
March 15, 2023; 7:00 p.m., ESPN+		at (2) North Texas; First round – Oklahoma State bracket	L 53–69	18–14	14 – Brewton	7 – Thorn	4 – Joshua	The Super Pit (4,308); Denton, TX
*Non-conference game. ^{#}Rankings from AP poll. (#) Tournament seedings in parentheses. All times are in Central.
