= Mason Forbes =

American basketball player

No. 14 – Waverley Falcons
- Position: Power forward
- League: NBL1 South

Personal information
- Born: February 5, 1999 (age 27) Folsom, California, U.S.
- Listed height: 6 ft 9 in (2.06 m)
- Listed weight: 230 lb (104 kg)

Career information
- High school: Folsom (Folsom, California)
- College: Harvard (2018–2022); Saint Mary's (2023–2024)
- NBA draft: 2024: undrafted
- Playing career: 2024–present

Career history
- 2024–present: Waverley Falcons

Career highlights
- NBL1 South All Second Team (2025)

Mason Forbes (born February 5, 1999) is an American basketball player for the Waverley Falcons of the NBL1 South. He played college basketball for the Harvard Crimson and Saint Mary's Gaels.

== High school career ==
Forbes attended Folsom High School in his hometown of Folsom, California.

== Collegiate career ==
=== Harvard Crimson (2018–2022) ===
In January 2018, Forbes committed to the Harvard Crimson.

Forbes played for the Crimson in 2018–19 and 2019–20. He did not play in 2020–21 due to the Ivy League cancelling the season. He played just 11 games in 2021–22.

=== St. Mary's Gaels (2022–2024) ===
In May 2022, Forbes transferred to the Saint Mary's Gaels.

After sitting out the 2022–23 season due to NCAA transfer regulations, Forbes played his final college season in 2023–24 for the Gaels.

=== College statistics ===
Year	Team	GP	GS	MPG	FG%	3P%	FT%	RPG	APG	SPG	BPG	PPG
2018–19	Harvard	21	2	8.6	.688	–	.500	1.0	.1	.1	.2	2.4
2019–20	Harvard	28	2	10.1	.610	–	.583	2.1	.4	.2	.6	3.6
2021–22	Harvard	11	10	26.6	.597	–	.538	5.3	1.2	.4	.8	8.0
2022–23	Saint Mary's	Redshirt										
Career		60	14	12.6	.621	–	.558	2.3	.4	.2	.5	4.0

== Professional career ==
Forbes played for the Waverley Falcons of the NBL1 South in Australia during the 2024 NBL1 season. In 19 games, he averaged 15.6 points, 7.5 rebounds, 1.0 assists and 1.6 blocks per game.

Forbes re-joined the Waverley Falcons for the 2025 NBL1 season. He was named NBL1 South All Second Team.

== Personal life ==
Forbes' father, Sterling Forbes Jr., played at Texas State and professionally in Argentina and with the Harlem Globetrotters. His grandfather, Sterling Forbes Sr., was an All-America selection for Pepperdine, a 1960 draft pick of the Los Angeles Lakers, and spent three years with the Harlem Globetrotters.
