= 2022–23 Utah Valley Wolverines men's basketball team =

2022–23 Utah Valley Wolverines men's basketball

WAC regular season champions

NIT, Semifinals
- Conference: Western Athletic Conference
- Record: 28–9 (15–3 WAC)
- Head coach: Mark Madsen (4th season)
- Associate head coach: Todd Phillips (4th season)
- Assistant coaches: Todd Okeson (4th season); Ken Moses (1st season)
- Home arena: UCCU Center (Capacity: 8,500)

2022–23 WAC men's basketball standings
	Conf.				Overall
Team	W		L	PCT	W		L	PCT
Utah Valley	15	–	3	.833	28	–	9	.757
Sam Houston	14	–	4	.778	26	–	8	.765
Southern Utah	12	–	6	.667	24	–	13	.649
Grand Canyon †	11	–	7	.611	24	–	12	.667
Seattle	11	–	7	.611	20	–	12	.625
Stephen F. Austin	11	–	7	.611	19	–	13	.594
Tarleton State *	9	–	9	.500	17	–	17	.500
California Baptist	8	–	10	.444	17	–	16	.515
Abilene Christian	7	–	11	.389	13	–	17	.433
UT Rio Grande Valley	6	–	12	.333	15	–	17	.469
UT Arlington	6	–	12	.333	11	–	21	.344
Utah Tech *	5	–	13	.278	14	–	19	.424
New Mexico State **	2	–	16	.111	9	–	15	.375
† Conference tournament winner * Ineligible for the NCAA tournament due to transition from NCAA Division II ** Remaining games as of February 11, 2023 cancelled.

The 2022–23 Utah Valley Wolverines men's basketball team represented Utah Valley University in the 2022–23 NCAA Division I men's basketball season. The Wolverines, led by fourth-year head coach Mark Madsen, played their home games at the UCCU Center in Orem, Utah, and competed as members of the Western Athletic Conference (WAC). They finished with an overall record of 24–7, 15–3 in WAC play, to finish in first place. In the 2023 WAC tournament, they defeated Tarleton in the quarterfinals before losing to Southern Utah in the semifinals the following day. As the conference leader who didn't win their tournament, they were offered an automatic bid to play in the NIT. They defeated New Mexico, Colorado, and Cincinnati to reach the semifinal round (their first time advancing to semifinals), where they finally fell to UAB in overtime, 86–88. With a final record of 28–9, the 2022–23 season marked the Wolverine's most successful season to date as a D-I program.

On March 29, 2023, head coach Mark Madsen announced that he would be departing Utah Valley to become the head coach at California.

== Previous season ==
The Wolverines finished the 2021–22 season 20–12, 10–8 in Western Athletic Conference play to finish in seventh place. As the Number 7 seed in the WAC Tournament, they defeated number 10 seed Chicago State 69–47 in the first round. In the second round, UVU lost to number 6 seed Abilene Christian 74–82.

== Offseason ==
=== Departures ===
Name	Position	Height	Year	Reason for departure
Fardaws Aimaq	C	6'11"	Junior	Transfer to Texas Tech
Connor Harding	G	6'6"	Senior	Graduation
Trey Farrer	F	6'9"	Junior	Transfer to Westminster

=== Incoming transfers ===
Name	Position	Height	Year	Previous school
Tahj Small	G	6'5"	Senior	Tarleton State
Aziz Bandaogo	C	7'0"	Sophomore	Akron
Cam Alford	G	6'1"	Junior	John A. Logan College
Cache Fields	G	6'6"	Junior	Gavilan College

== Roster ==
2022–23 Utah Valley Wolverines men's basketball team
Players
Coaches

Pos.	#	Name	Height	Weight	Year	Previous school	Hometown
G	0	Justin Harmon	6 ft 4 in (1.93 m)	180 lb (82 kg)	Sr	Curie HS; Barton CC	Chicago, IL
G	1	Le'Tre Darthard	6 ft 4 in (1.93 m)	180 lb (82 kg)	Jr	Denton Guyer HS; McCook CC	Denton, TX
F	2	Tim Ceaser	6 ft 9 in (2.06 m)	210 lb (95 kg)	Jr	Marion HS; Coastal Carolina	Marion, AR
G	3	Blaze Nield	6 ft 1 in (1.85 m)	185 lb (84 kg)	Sr	BYU; USU-Eastern	Lehi, UT
G	4	Trey Woodbury	6 ft 4 in (1.93 m)	200 lb (91 kg)	Sr	Clark HS; UNLV	Las Vegas, NV
F/C	5	Tim Fuller	6 ft 9 in (2.06 m)	235 lb (107 kg)	RS Sr	Highland HS; Weber State	Gilbert, AZ
G	10	Cam Alford	6 ft 1 in (1.85 m)	205 lb (93 kg)	Jr	Brownsburg HS; John A. Logan College	Indianapolis, IN
C	11	Tahj Small	6 ft 5 in (1.96 m)	195 lb (88 kg)	Sr	Word of God Academy; Tarleton	Durham, NC
G	12	Raul Freire Del Tio (W)	5 ft 11 in (1.8 m)	165 lb (75 kg)	Fr	IES Virgen de Valme	Seville, Spain
G	13	Jaden McClanahan	5 ft 10 in (1.78 m)	175 lb (79 kg)	Jr	Salesian HS; Independence CC	Vallejo, CA
G	15	Cache Fields (W)	6 ft 6 in (1.98 m)	210 lb (95 kg)	Jr	Pinewood HS; Gavilan College	Palo Alto, CA
G	20	Trevan Leonhardt (W)	6 ft 4 in (1.93 m)	175 lb (79 kg)	Fr	Davis HS	Kaysville, UT
G	21	Brenden Crowther (W)	6 ft 5 in (1.96 m)	200 lb (91 kg)	Fr	Alamosa HS	Alamosa, CO
G	22	Jordan Battle	6 ft 2 in (1.88 m)	200 lb (91 kg)	So	Hargrave Military Academy	Chesapeake, VA
F	34	Joao Das Chagas	6 ft 10 in (2.08 m)	240 lb (109 kg)	Fr	NBA Academy	Niquelândia, Brazil
F	35	Ethan Potter	6 ft 8 in (2.03 m)	205 lb (93 kg)	Fr	Layton HS	Layton, UT
C	55	Aziz Bandaogo	7 ft 0 in (2.13 m)	230 lb (104 kg)	So	NBA Academy Africa; Akron	Dakar, Senegal

Head coach

- Mark Madsen (Stanford)

Assistant coach(es)

- Todd Phillips (Lewis–Clark State)
- Todd Okeson (Nevada)
- Ken Moses (CSU Pueblo)

Legend

- (C) Team captain
- (S) Suspended
- (I) Ineligible
- (W) Walk-on
- Injured
- Current redshirt

Roster
Last update: November 4, 2022

== Schedule and results ==
Date time, TV	Rank^{#}	Opponent^{#}	Result	Record	Site (attendance) city, state
Non-conference regular season
Nov 7, 2022*; 7:00 pm, MW Network		at Utah State	L 58–75	0–1	Smith Spectrum (7,430); Logan, UT
Nov 9, 2022*; 6:00 pm, ESPN+		Western Colorado	W 91–64	1–1	UCCU Center (1,449); Orem, UT
Nov 12, 2022*; 2:00 pm, ESPN+		Northern Arizona; Native American Heritage Game	W 73–69	2–1	UCCU Center (2,034); Orem, UT
Nov 15, 2022*; 5:00 pm, ACCN		at Wake Forest; Jamaica Classic campus site game	L 65–68 ^{OT}	2–2	LJVM Coliseum (5,694); Winston-Salem, NC
Nov 18, 2022*; 5:00 pm, HBCUgo		vs. Morgan State; Jamaica Classic	L 72–73 ^{OT}	2–3	Montego Bay Convention Centre (5,307); Montego Bay, Jamaica
Nov 20, 2022*; 5:30 pm, HBCUgo		vs. Green Bay; Jamaica Classic	W 79–56	3–3	Montego Bay Convention Centre (5,128); Montego Bay, Jamaica
Nov 26, 2022*; 2:00 pm, MW Network		at Boise State	L 69–87	3–4	ExtraMile Arena (8,544); Boise, ID
Dec 3, 2022*; 2:00 pm, ESPN+		Long Beach State	W 88–78	4–4	UCCU Center (1,389); Orem, UT
Dec 7, 2022*; 7:00 pm, BYUtv		at BYU; UCCU Crosstown Clash	W 75–60	5–4	Marriott Center (13,925); Provo, UT
Dec 10, 2022*; 7:00 pm, ESPN+		at Northern Arizona	W 80–75 ^{OT}	6–4	Walkup Skydome (676); Flagstaff, AZ
Dec 13, 2022*; 6:00 pm, ESPN+		SAGU American Indian College	W 100–54	7–4	UCCU Center (1,427); Orem, UT
Dec 16, 2022*; 6:00 pm, ESPN+		Antelope Valley	W 80–54	8–4	UCCU Center (1,141); Orem, UT
Dec 20, 2022*; 8:30 pm, P12N		at Oregon	W 77–72	9–4	Matthew Knight Arena (5,064); Eugene, OR
WAC regular season
Dec 29, 2022; 6:00 pm, ESPN+		Sam Houston	W 80–64	10–4 (1–0)	UCCU Center (1,911); Orem, UT
Dec 31, 2022; 2:00 pm, ESPN+		Utah Tech; Old Hammer Rivalry	W 71–60	11–4 (2–0)	UCCU Center (2,463); Orem, UT
Jan 5, 2023; 6:00 pm, ESPN+		at UT Arlington	W 72–64	12–4 (3–0)	College Park Center (1,017); Arlington, TX
Jan 7, 2023; 5:30 pm, ESPN+		at UTRGV	W 75–61	13–4 (4–0)	UTRGV Fieldhouse (517); Edinburg, TX
Jan 11, 2023; 8:00 pm, ESPN+		at Cal Baptist	W 71–67	14–4 (5–0)	CBU Events Center (2,611); Riverside, CA
Jan 14, 2023; 6:00 pm, ESPN+		Seattle U	L 80–85	14–5 (5–1)	UCCU Center (2,976); Orem, UT
Jan 18, 2023; 6:00 pm, ESPN+		Abilene Christian	W 84–54	15–5 (6–1)	UCCU Center (2,827); Orem, UT
Jan 21, 2023; 6:00 pm, ESPN+		at Grand Canyon	W 76–74	16–5 (7–1)	GCU Arena (7,007); Phoenix, AZ
Jan 26, 2023; 7:00 pm, ESPN+		at Southern Utah	L 67–79	16–6 (7–2)	America First Event Center (4,013); Cedar City, UT
Jan 28, 2023; 2:00 pm, ESPN+		New Mexico State	W 77–72	17–6 (8–2)	UCCU Center (2,915); Orem, UT
Feb 2, 2023; 7:00 pm, ESPN+		at Utah Tech	W 76–69	18–6 (9–2)	Burns Arena (2,424); St. George, UT
Feb 8, 2023; 6:00 pm, ESPN+		Cal Baptist	W 71–55	19–6 (10–2)	UCCU Center (1,886); Orem, UT
Feb 11, 2023; 6:00 pm, ESPN+		Southern Utah	W 90–83	20–6 (11–2)	UCCU Center (5,168); Orem, UT
Feb 18, 2023; 6:00 pm, ESPN+		at Seattle U	W 67–58	21–6 (12–2)	Redhawk Center (999); Seattle, WA
Feb 23, 2023; 6:00 pm, ESPN+		at Tarleton	L 58–77	21–7 (12–3)	Wisdom Gym (2,017); Stephenville, TX
Feb 25, 2023; 5:00 pm, ESPN+		at Abilene Christian	W 66–62	22–7 (13–3)	Moody Coliseum (1,951); Abilene, TX
Mar 1, 2023; 6:00 pm, ESPN+		UT Arlington	W 78–59	23–7 (14–3)	UCCU Center (2,574); Orem, UT
Mar 3, 2023; 6:00 pm, ESPN+		Stephen F. Austin	W 113–69	24–7 (15–3)	UCCU Center (2,267); Orem, UT
WAC tournament
Mar 9, 2023; 6:00 pm, ESPN+	(2)	vs. (7) Tarleton; Quarterfinals	W 72–58	25–7	Orleans Arena; Paradise, NV
Mar 10, 2023; 8:00 pm, ESPN+	(2)	vs. (3) Southern Utah; Semifinals	L 88–89	25–8	Orleans Arena (3,003); Paradise, NV
NIT
Mar 15, 2023*; 8:00 p.m., ESPN+		at (2) New Mexico; First Round – Rutgers Bracket	W 83–69	26–8	The Pit (6,803); Albuquerque, NM
Mar 19, 2023*; 7:30 p.m., ESPNU		at (3) Colorado; Second Round – Rutgers Bracket	W 81–69	27–8	CU Events Center (3,964); Boulder, CO
Mar 22, 2023*; 7:00 p.m., ESPN2		(4) Cincinnati; Quarterfinals – Rutgers Bracket	W 74–68	28–8	UCCU Center (5,289); Orem, UT
March 28, 2023; 7:30 p.m., ESPN2		vs. (4) UAB; Semifinals	L 86–88 ^{OT}	28–9	Orleans Arena (2,931); Paradise, NV
*Non-conference game. ^{#}Rankings from AP Poll. (#) Tournament seedings in parentheses. All times are in Mountain.

== See also ==
- 2022–23 Utah Valley Wolverines women's basketball team
