= 2022–23 Boise State Broncos men's basketball team =

Men's basketball team in United States

2022–23 Boise State Broncos men's basketball

NCAA tournament, First Round
- Conference: Mountain West Conference
- Record: 24–10 (13–5 MW)
- Head coach: Leon Rice (13th season)
- Assistant coaches: Mike Burns; Tim Duryea; Roberto Bergersen
- Home arena: ExtraMile Arena

2022–23 Mountain West Conference men's basketball standings
	Conf.				Overall
Team	W		L	PCT	W		L	PCT
No. 18 San Diego State †	15	–	3	.833	32	–	7	.821
Boise State	13	–	5	.722	24	–	10	.706
Utah State	13	–	5	.722	26	–	9	.743
Nevada	12	–	6	.667	22	–	11	.667
San Jose State	10	–	8	.556	21	–	14	.600
New Mexico	8	–	10	.444	22	–	12	.647
UNLV	7	–	11	.389	19	–	13	.594
Colorado State	6	–	12	.333	15	–	18	.455
Fresno State	6	–	12	.333	11	–	20	.355
Air Force	5	–	13	.278	14	–	18	.438
Wyoming	4	–	14	.222	9	–	22	.290
† Conference tournament winner Rankings from AP poll

The 2022–23 Boise State Broncos men's basketball team represented Boise State University in the Mountain West Conference during the 2022–23 NCAA Division I men's basketball season. Led by thirteenth-year head coach Leon Rice, the Broncos played their home games on campus at ExtraMile Arena in Boise, Idaho.

Boise State finished the regular season at 23–8 (13–5 in Mountain West, second). In the conference tournament, they defeated UNLV in the quarterfinals, then lost to Utah State in the semifinals. The Broncos received an at-large bid to the NCAA tournament and were seeded tenth in the West region; they were defeated by seventh seed Northwestern in the first round at Sacramento and finished at 24–10.

== Previous season ==
The Broncos finished the 2021–22 season at 27–8 (15–3 in Mountain West, first) to finish as regular season champions, and defeated Nevada, Wyoming, and San Diego State to win the conference tournament. They received the automatic bid to the NCAA tournament as the eighth seed in the West region, but lost in the first round to Memphis.

== Offseason ==
=== Departures ===
Name	Number	Pos.	Height	Weight	Year	Hometown	Reason for departure
Kasean Pryor	1	G	6'9"	200	Sophomore	Chicago, IL	Transferred to Northwest Florida State College
Emmanuel Akot	14	G	6'8"	210	RS Senior	Winnipeg, MB	Graduate transferred to Western Kentucky
Abu Kigab	24	F	6'7"	220	GS Senior	St. Catharines, ON	Graduated/signed to play professionally with Niagara River Lions
Mladen Armus	33	F	6'10"	240	RS Senior	Belgrade, Serbia	Graduated

=== Incoming transfers ===
Name	Num	Pos.	Height	Weight	Year	Hometown	Previous school
Chibuzo Agbo	11	G	6'7"	220	Junior	San Diego, CA	Texas Tech
Mohamed Sylla	14	C	6'11"	235	Senior	Abidjan, Ivory Coast	Detroit Mercy

=== Recruiting classes ===
==== 2022 recruiting class ====
College recruiting information
Name	Hometown	School	Height	Weight	Commit date
Sadraque Nganga #23 PF	Phoenix, AZ	AZ Compass Prep	6 ft 8 in (2.03 m)	190 lb (86 kg)	Feb 16, 2022
Sadraque Nganga #23 PF	Recruit ratings: Rivals: 247Sports: ESPN: (82)				
Jace Whiting; SG	Burley, ID	Burley Senior High School	6 ft 1 in (1.85 m)	N/A	Nov 13, 2019
Jace Whiting; SG	Recruit ratings: No ratings found				
Overall recruit ranking: Scout: – Rivals: –
Note: In many cases, Scout, Rivals, 247Sports, On3, and ESPN may conflict in their listings of height and weight.; In these cases, the average was taken. ESPN grades are on a 100-point scale.; Sources: "2022 Team Ranking". Rivals.

==== 2023 recruiting class ====
College recruiting information (2023)
Name	Hometown	School	Height	Weight	Commit date
Andrew Meadow; PF	Valencia, CA	West Ranch High School	6 ft 8 in (2.03 m)	2,000 lb (910 kg)	Aug 11, 2022
Andrew Meadow; PF	Recruit ratings: No ratings found				
Overall recruit ranking: Scout: – Rivals: –
Note: In many cases, Scout, Rivals, 247Sports, On3, and ESPN may conflict in their listings of height and weight.; In these cases, the average was taken. ESPN grades are on a 100-point scale.; Sources: "2023 Team Ranking". Rivals.

== Roster ==
2022–23 Boise State Broncos men's basketball team
Players
Coaches

Pos.	#	Name	Height	Weight	Year	Previous school	Hometown
G	0	Kade Rice (W)	6 ft 4 in (1.93 m)	190 lb (86 kg)	Fr	Bishop Kelly HS	Boise, ID
F	1	Sadraque NgaNga	6 ft 10 in (2.08 m)	220 lb (100 kg)	Fr	AZ Compass Prep	Luanda, Angola
F	2	Tyson Degenhart	6 ft 7 in (2.01 m)	232 lb (105 kg)	So	Mt. Spokane HS	Spokane, WA
G	3	Kobe Young	6 ft 6 in (1.98 m)	204 lb (93 kg)	RS Fr	Chiawana HS	Pasco, WA
F	4	Burke Smith	6 ft 11 in (2.11 m)	230 lb (104 kg)	RS So	Trinity Episcopal School	Glen Allen, VA
G	5	RJ Keene	6 ft 6 in (1.98 m)	202 lb (92 kg)	RS Fr	Concordia Lutheran HS	The Woodlands, TX
G	10	Marcus Shaver Jr.	6 ft 2 in (1.88 m)	185 lb (84 kg)	RS Sr	Shadow Mountain HS; Portland	Phoenix, AZ
G	11	Chibuzo Agbo	6 ft 7 in (2.01 m)	220 lb (100 kg)	Jr	St. Augustine; Texas Tech	San Diego, CA
G	12	Max Rice (W)	6 ft 5 in (1.96 m)	200 lb (91 kg)	RS Sr	Bishop Kelly HS	Boise, ID
G	13	Pavle Kuzmanovic	6 ft 5 in (1.96 m)	190 lb (86 kg)	Jr	ABS Primorje 1945	Lužnica, Serbia
C	14	Mohamed Sylla	6 ft 11 in (2.11 m)	240 lb (109 kg)	Sr	Putnam Science Academy; Detroit Mercy	Abidjan, Ivory Coast
G	15	Jace Whiting	6 ft 2 in (1.88 m)	185 lb (84 kg)	Fr	Burley HS	Burley, ID
G	22	Sam Winter (W)	6 ft 2 in (1.88 m)	185 lb (84 kg)	Jr	Montesano HS	Montesano, WA
F	23	Naje Smith	6 ft 7 in (2.01 m)	205 lb (93 kg)	GS	Lewis and Clark HS; Cochise College	Spokane, WA
C	25	Lukas Milner	6 ft 10 in (2.08 m)	238 lb (108 kg)	GS	Olathe North HS	Olathe, KS

Head coach

- Leon Rice (Washington State)

Assistant coach(es)

- Mike Burns (Central Washington)
- Tim Duryea (North Texas)
- Roberto Bergersen (Boise State)

Legend

- (C) Team captain
- (S) Suspended
- (I) Ineligible
- (W) Walk-on
- Injured
- Current redshirt

Roster

== Schedule and results ==
Date time, TV	Rank^{#}	Opponent^{#}	Result	Record	High points	High rebounds	High assists	Site (attendance) city, state
Exhibition
November 1, 2022*; 7:00 p.m.		Carroll (MT)	W 76–58		19 – Degenhart	6 – Tied	4 – Rice	ExtraMile Arena (2,038); Boise, ID
Non-conference regular season
November 9, 2022*; 7:00 p.m., MW Network		South Dakota State	L 66–68	0–1	21 – Rice	6 – Shaver, Jr.	5 – Shaver, Jr.	ExtraMile Arena (9,796); Boise, ID
November 12, 2022*; 5:00 p.m., MW Network		vs. Washington State; ICCU Capital City Classic	W 71–61	1–1	15 – Tied	10 – Shaver, Jr.	5 – Shaver, Jr.	Idaho Central Arena (4,157); Boise, ID
November 17, 2022*; 5:00 p.m., ESPNews		vs. Charlotte; Myrtle Beach Invitational Quarterfinals	L 42–54	1–2	14 – Degenhart	10 – Shaver, Jr.	3 – Shaver, Jr.	HTC Center (1,123); Conway, SC
November 18, 2022*; 7:30 p.m., ESPN+		vs. Loyola–Chicago; Myrtle Beach Invitational Consolation round	W 70–48	2–2	24 – Agbo	9 – Shaver, Jr.	4 – Shaver, Jr.	HTC Center (1,312); Conway, SC
November 20, 2022*; 5:00 p.m., ESPNews		vs. Colorado; Myrtle Beach Invitational – 5th place	W 68–55	3–2	20 – Shaver, Jr.	10 – Shaver, Jr.	3 – Rice	HTC Center (1,281); Conway, SC
November 26, 2022*; 2:00 p.m., MW Network		Utah Valley	W 87–69	4–2	20 – Agbo	9 – Shaver, Jr.	6 – Shaver, Jr.	ExtraMile Arena (8,544); Boise, ID
November 29, 2022*; 7:00 p.m., MW Network		Cal State Northridge	W 55–46	5–2	19 – Shaver, Jr.	9 – Smith	4 – Shaver, Jr.	ExtraMile Arena (7,511); Boise, ID
December 3, 2022*; 5:00 p.m., ESPNU		vs. Texas A&M; Battleground 2K22	W 86–71	6–2	25 – Rice	11 – Agbo	4 – Tied	Dickies Arena (2,812); Fort Worth, TX
December 6, 2022*; 7:00 p.m., MW Network		Eastern Oregon	W 90–54	7–2	19 – Degenhart	9 – Rice	7 – Rice	ExtraMile Arena (7,195); Boise, ID
December 10, 2022*; 6:00 p.m., ESPN+		at Saint Louis	W 57–52	8–2	18 – Agbo	Smith – 7	4 – Shaver, Jr.	Chaifetz Arena; St. Louis, MO
December 13, 2022*; 7:00 p.m., MW Network		New Orleans	W 91–50	9–2	16 – Young	8 – Rice	4 – Whiting	ExtraMile Arena (7,254); Boise, ID
December 18, 2022*; 2:00 p.m., MW Network		Oakland	W 77–57	10–2	17 – Degenhart	10 – Rice	4 – Whiting	ExtraMile Arena (7,715); Boise, ID
December 22, 2022*; 3:00 p.m., WCC Network		at Santa Clara	L 58–73	10–3	12 – Agbo	9 – Degenhart	2 – Tied	Leavey Center (1,061); Santa Clara, CA
Mountain West regular season
December 28, 2022; 8:00 p.m., NSN		at Nevada	L 72–74	10–4 (0–1)	22 – Shaver, Jr.	11 – Agbo	3 – Shaver, Jr.	Lawlor Events Center (7,911); Reno, NV
January 3, 2023; 7:00 p.m., MW Network		San José State	W 67–64	11–4 (1–1)	15 – Agbo	7 – Smith	3 – Rice	ExtraMile Arena (8,113); Boise, ID
January 7, 2023; 4:30 p.m., FS1		Utah State	W 82–59	12–4 (2–1)	19 – Degenhart	10 – Degenhart	5 – Tied	ExtraMile Arena (12,007); Boise, ID
January 11, 2023; 9:00 p.m., CBSSN		at UNLV	W 84–62	13–4 (3–1)	17 – Degenhart	12 – Degenhart	6 – Degenhart	Thomas & Mack Center (5,102); Paradise, NV
January 14, 2023; 9:00 p.m., FS1		at Wyoming	W 85–68	14–4 (4–1)	18 – Agbo	9 – Agbo	9 – Shaver, Jr.	Arena-Auditorium (4,178); Laramie, WY
January 17, 2023; 7:00 p.m.		Nevada	W 77–62	15–4 (5–1)	29 – Rice	8 – Smith	5 – Shaver, Jr.	ExtraMile Arena (9,653); Boise, ID
January 20, 2023; 9:00 p.m., FS1		at New Mexico	L 79–81 ^{OT}	15–5 (5–2)	28 – Degenhart	13 – Smith	4 – Shaver, Jr.	The Pit (14,566); Albuquerque, NM
January 24, 2023; 7:00 p.m., FS1		Fresno State	W 63–53	16–5 (6–2)	16 – Shaver Jr.	6 – Tied	4 – Shaver Jr.	ExtraMile Arena (9,010); Boise, ID
January 28, 2023; 6:00 p.m., CBSSN		Colorado State	W 80–59	17–5 (7–2)	22 – Degenhart	6 – Agbo	7 – Agbo	ExtraMile Arena (12,021); Boise, ID
January 31, 2023; 7:00 p.m.		at Air Force	W 59–52	18–5 (8–2)	22 – Rice	7 – Rice	2 – Tied	Clune Arena (843); Colorado Springs, CO
February 3, 2023; 7:00 p.m., FS1		at No. 22 San Diego State	L 52–72	18–6 (8–3)	16 – Rice	5 – Tied	2 – Tied	Viejas Arena (12,414); San Diego, CA
February 11, 2023; 6:00 p.m., CBSSN		Wyoming	W 75–63	19–6 (9–3)	20 – Degenhart	10 – Smith	4 – Shaver	ExtraMile Arena (11,037); Boise, ID
February 15, 2023; 8:00 p.m., FS1		at Colorado State	W 80–78	20–6 (10–3)	19 – Degenhart	7 – Smith	4 – Rice	Moby Arena (3,521); Fort Collins, CO
February 18, 2023; 7:00 p.m., FS1		UNLV	W 73–69	21–6 (11–3)	19 – Shaver Jr.	8 – Rice	2 – Tied	ExtraMile Arena (11,004); Boise, ID
February 22, 2023; 8:30 p.m., FS1		New Mexico	W 82–77	22–6 (12–3)	30 – Rice	7 – Tied	2 – Tied	ExtraMile Arena (9,825); Boise, ID
February 25, 2023; 2:00 p.m.		at San José State	L 68-74 ^{OT}	22–7 (12–4)	17 – Agbo	11 – Smith	5 – Rice	Provident Credit Union Event Center (2,321); San Jose, CA
February 28, 2023; 7:00 p.m., CBSSN		No. 18 San Diego State	W 66–60	23–7 (13–4)	26 – Rice	7 – Shaver	3 – Whiting	ExtraMile Arena (12,208); Boise, ID
March 4, 2023; 7:00 p.m., MW Network		at Utah State	L 73–86	23–8 (13–5)	18 – Agbo	7 – Shaver Jr.	5 – Shaver Jr.	Smith Spectrum (9,963); Logan, UT
Mountain West tournament
March 9, 2023; 6:00 p.m., CBSSN	(2)	at (7) UNLV; Quarterfinals	W 87–76 ^{OT}	24–8	18 – Smith	8 – Tied	5 – Shaver Jr.	Thomas & Mack Center; Paradise, NV
March 10, 2023; 9:00 p.m., CBSSN	(2)	vs. (3) Utah State; Semifinals	L 62–72	24–9	14 – Shaver Jr.	8 – Shaver Jr.	3 – Shaver Jr.	Thomas & Mack Center; Paradise, NV
NCAA Tournament
March 16, 2023*; 5:35 pm, TruTV	(10 W)	vs. (7 W) Northwestern; First Round	L 67–75	24–10	17 – Rice	11 – Smith	4 – Tied	Golden 1 Center; Sacramento, CA
*Non-conference game. ^{#}Rankings from AP Poll. (#) Tournament seedings in parentheses. All times are in Mountain Time.

== Rankings ==
Ranking movements Legend: — = Not ranked RV = Received votes
	Week																			
Poll	Pre	1	2	3	4	5	6	7	8	9	10	11	12	13	14	15	16	17	18	Final
AP	—																			Not released
Coaches	RV	^																		

*AP does not release post-NCAA tournament rankings
^Coaches did not release a Week 1 poll.
