= 2022–23 San Jose State Spartans men's basketball team =

American college basketball season

2022–23 San Jose State Spartans men's basketball

CBI, Quarterfinals
- Conference: Mountain West Conference
- Record: 21–14 (10–8 MW)
- Head coach: Tim Miles (2nd season)
- Assistant coaches: Ben Johnson; Damany Hendrix; Jeff Strohm
- Home arena: Provident Credit Union Event Center (Capacity: 5,000)

2022–23 Mountain West Conference men's basketball standings
	Conf.				Overall
Team	W		L	PCT	W		L	PCT
No. 18 San Diego State †	15	–	3	.833	32	–	7	.821
Boise State	13	–	5	.722	24	–	10	.706
Utah State	13	–	5	.722	26	–	9	.743
Nevada	12	–	6	.667	22	–	11	.667
San Jose State	10	–	8	.556	21	–	14	.600
New Mexico	8	–	10	.444	22	–	12	.647
UNLV	7	–	11	.389	19	–	13	.594
Colorado State	6	–	12	.333	15	–	18	.455
Fresno State	6	–	12	.333	11	–	20	.355
Air Force	5	–	13	.278	14	–	18	.438
Wyoming	4	–	14	.222	9	–	22	.290
† Conference tournament winner Rankings from AP poll

The 2022–23 San Jose State Spartans men's basketball team represented San Jose State University in the 2022–23 NCAA Division I men's basketball season. They were led by second-year head coach Tim Miles and played their games at Provident Credit Union Event Center as members of the Mountain West Conference. They finished the season 24–14, 10–8 in MWC play to finish in fifth place. They defeated Nevada in the quarterfinals of the MWC tournament before being falling to top-seeded San Diego State in the semifinals. The Spartans received an invitation to compete in the College Basketball Invitational, their first postseason tournament since 2011. In the opening round, they defeated Southern Indiana, marking the Spartans' first ever postseason victory, before losing to Radford in the quarterfinals.

With a final overall record of 21–14, the season marked school's most successful season since 1980–81.

== Previous season ==
The Spartans finished the 2022–22 season 8–23, 1–17 in MWC play to finish in last place. They lost to Fresno State in the first round of the MWC tournament.

== Offseason ==
=== Departures ===
Name	Number	Pos.	Height	Weight	Year	Hometown	Reason for departure
Caleb Simmons	1	G	6'6"	205	RS Senior	Vallejo, CA	Graduate transferred
Shon Robinson	2	F	6'9"	205	RS Sophomore	Chicago, IL	Transferred to Austin Peay
Sebastian Mendoza	4	G	6'3"	195	Sophomore	Riverside, CA	Transferred
Eduardo Lane	12	C	6'11"	240	RS Senior	Aquidauana, Brazil	Graduate transferred to Siena
Majok Kuath	23	F	6'8"	183	Junior	Salt Lake City, UT	Transferred to Northwestern State
Michael Ofoegbu	24	F	6'7"	205	Sophomore	Lakewood, CA	Transferred to Colby CC
Josh O'Garro	42	G	6'6"	175	Sophomore	George Town, Cayman Islands	Transferred to Colby CC
Trey Smith	44	G	6'3"	195	Senior	Cypress, CA	Walk-on; transferred to Idaho
Harminder Dhaliwal	50	C	6'10"	235	Junior	Laguna Niguel, CA	Walk-on; left the team for personal reasons

=== Incoming transfers ===
Name	Number	Pos.	Height	Weight	Year	Hometown	Previous college
Kellen King	20	G	6'4"	190	RS Senior	Brentwood, TN	Walk-on; Missouri–St. Louis
Robert Vaihola	22	F	6'8"	245	Sophomore	San Francisco, CA	Fresno State
Sage Tolbert III	23	F	6'8"	210	RS Senior	New Orleans, LA	Temple

=== 2022 recruiting class ===
College recruiting
Name	Hometown	School	Height	Weight	Commit date
Max Allen #35 C	Chandler, AZ	AZ Compass Prep	6 ft 8 in (2.03 m)	260 lb (120 kg)	Nov 9, 2021
Max Allen #35 C	Recruit ratings: Scout: Rivals: 247Sports: ESPN: (79)				
Leo Torbor; PG	Minneapolis, MN	Park Center High School	6 ft 4 in (1.93 m)	180 lb (82 kg)	Jul 5, 2022
Leo Torbor; PG	Recruit ratings: Scout: Rivals: 247Sports: ESPN: (NR)				
Garrett Anderson; PF	Phoenix, AZ	PHHoenix Prep	6 ft 6 in (1.98 m)	180 lb (82 kg)	Jul 5, 2022
Garrett Anderson; PF	Recruit ratings: Scout: Rivals: 247Sports: ESPN: (NR)				
J.T. elder SG	Tucson, AZ	PHHoenix Prep	6 ft 7 in (2.01 m)	190 lb (86 kg)	Apr 6, 2022
J.T. elder SG	Recruit ratings: Scout: Rivals: 247Sports: ESPN: (NR)				
Kevin Simeth; SF	Geneva, Switzerland	Collège de Montbrillant	6 ft 4 in (1.93 m)	207 lb (94 kg)	Jun 21, 2022
Kevin Simeth; SF	Recruit ratings: Scout: Rivals: 247Sports: ESPN: (NR)				
Overall recruit ranking: Scout: – Rivals: –
Note: In many cases, Scout, Rivals, 247Sports, On3, and ESPN may conflict in their listings of height and weight.; In these cases, the average was taken. ESPN grades are on a 100-point scale.; Sources: "2022 San Jose State Basketball Recruiting Commits". Scout.; "Scout.com Team Recruiting Rankings". Scout.; "2022 Team Ranking". Rivals.

== Roster ==
2022–23 San Jose State Spartans men's basketball team
Players
Coaches

Pos.	#	Name	Height	Weight	Year	Previous school	Hometown
G	0	M. J. Amey Jr.	6 ft 5 in (1.96 m)	178 lb (81 kg)	So	Scotland Prep (Pa.)	Vacaville, California
G	1	Garrett Anderson	6 ft 7 in (2.01 m)	185 lb (84 kg)	Fr	PHH Prep	Phoenix, Arizona
F	2	Max Allen	6 ft 9 in (2.06 m)	260 lb (118 kg)	Fr	Coronado HS	Las Vegas, Nevada
G	4	Leo Torbor	6 ft 4 in (1.93 m)	175 lb (79 kg)	Fr	Park Center HS	Brooklyn Center, Minnesota
C	5	Ibrahima Diallo	7 ft 0 in (2.13 m)	220 lb (100 kg)	RS Jr	Prolific Prep; Ohio State	Saly, Senegal
F	10	Omari Moore	6 ft 6 in (1.98 m)	195 lb (88 kg)	RS Jr	Pasadena HS	Pasadena, California
G	11	J. T. Elder	6 ft 7 in (2.01 m)	190 lb (86 kg)	Fr	PHH Prep	Tucson, Arizona
G	13	Alvaro Cardenas Torre	6 ft 1 in (1.85 m)	180 lb (82 kg)	So	Get Better Academy	Granada, Spain
F	15	Trey Anderson	6 ft 7 in (2.01 m)	206 lb (93 kg)	RS Jr	Mater Dei Catholic; South Carolina	San Diego, California
F	20	Kellen King (W)	6 ft 4 in (1.93 m)	190 lb (86 kg)	RS Sr	Brentwood HS; Missouri–St. Louis	Brentwood, Tennessee
F	21	Nico D'Augsta (W)	6 ft 5 in (1.96 m)	200 lb (91 kg)	Fr	Valley Christian HS	San Jose, California
F	22	Robert Vaihola	6 ft 8 in (2.03 m)	245 lb (111 kg)	So	Archbishop Riordan HS; Fresno State	San Francisco, California
F	23	Sage Tolbert III	6 ft 8 in (2.03 m)	210 lb (95 kg)	RS Sr	Combine Academy; Temple	New Orleans, Louisiana
F	31	Tibet Görener	6 ft 9 in (2.06 m)	200 lb (91 kg)	RS So	Orange Lutheran HS (CA); Arizona	Istanbul, Turkey
F	33	Kevin Simeth	6 ft 4 in (1.93 m)	207 lb (94 kg)	Fr	Collège Voltaire	Geneva, Switzerland

Head coach

- Tim Miles (Mary)

Assistant coach(es)

- Ben Johnson (Green Bay)
- Damany Hendrix (Lamar)
- Jeff Strohm (Eastern Illinois)

Legend

- (C) Team captain
- (S) Suspended
- (I) Ineligible
- (W) Walk-on
- Injured
- Current redshirt

Roster

== Schedule and results ==
Date time, TV	Rank^{#}	Opponent^{#}	Result	Record	High points	High rebounds	High assists	Site (attendance) city, state
Exhibition
November 4, 2022*; 7:00 p.m., Twitter		Cal State Los Angeles	W 69–66		22 – Moore	11 – Tolbert III	5 – Moore	Provident Credit Union Event Center (875); San Jose, CA
Non-conference regular season
November 8, 2022*; 7:00 p.m., MW Network		Georgia Southern	W 63–48	1–0	14 – Tied	9 – Moore	3 – Gorener	Provident Credit Union Event Center (2,241); San Jose, CA
November 12, 2022*; 1:00 p.m., MW Network		Bethesda	W 90–68	2–0	14 – Vaihola	14 – Tolbert III	7 – Cardenas	Provident Credit Union Event Center (1,322); San Jose, CA
November 15, 2022*; 7:00 p.m., MW Network		Alabama State	W 70–57	3–0	19 – Moore	7 – Tolbert III	4 – Tied	Provident Credit Union Event Center (1,587); San Jose, CA
November 17, 2022*; 7:00 p.m., NBCSBA		Hofstra	L 76–85	3–1	17 – Tied	12 – Tolbert III	6 – Moore	Provident Credit Union Event Center (1,652); San Jose, CA
November 19, 2022*; 1:00 p.m., ESPN+		at Northern Colorado	W 80–69	4–1	20 – Moore	11 – Anderson	4 – Tied	Bank of Colorado Arena (1,065); Greeley, CO
November 25, 2022*; 2:30 p.m., FloSports		vs. North Texas; Nassau Championship quarterfinals	L 54–69	4–2	16 – Anderson	4 – Moore	3 – Moore	Baha Mar Convention Center (248); Nassau, BAH
November 26, 2022*; 11:30 a.m., FloSports		vs. Oakland; Nassau Championship consolation 2nd round	W 80–67	5–2	25 – Tolbert III	9 – Moore	9 – Moore	Baha Mar Convention Center (239); Nassau, BAH
November 27, 2022*; 11:30 a.m., FloSports		vs. Ball State; Nassau Championship 5th place game	W 67–65	6–2	15 – Tied	8 – Vaihola	5 – Moore	Baha Mar Convention Center (270); Nassau, BAH
December 3, 2022*; 1:00 p.m., SECN		at No. 11 Arkansas	L 58–99	6–3	21 – Moore	11 – Tolbert III	4 – Moore	Bud Walton Arena (19,200); Fayetteville, AR
December 6, 2022*; 7:00 p.m., NBCSBA		Cal State Bakersfield	W 58–48	7–3	10 – Cardenas	11 – Diallo	5 – Moore	Provident Credit Union Event Center (1,546); San Jose, CA
December 10, 2022*; 2:00 p.m., WCC Network		at Santa Clara	W 75–64	8–3	24 – Moore	12 – Tolbert III	7 – Moore	Leavey Center (1,225); Santa Clara, CA
December 17, 2022*; 4:00 p.m., WCC Network		at Pacific	L 58–59	8–4	17 – Cardenas	7 – Tied	5 – Tolbert III	Alex G. Spanos Center (1,392); Stockton, CA
December 20, 2022*; 7:00 p.m., MW Network		Cal Poly	W 65–43	9–4	15 – Moore	8 – Tied	3 – Tied	Provident Credit Union Event Center (1,233); San Jose, CA
Mountain West regular season
December 28, 2022; 7:00 p.m., MW Network		UNLV	W 75–72 ^{OT}	10–4 (1–0)	15 – Moore	13 – Vaihola	7 – Moore	Provident Credit Union Events Center (2,234); San Jose, CA
December 31, 2022; 1:00 p.m., MW Network		at Colorado State	W 78–70	11–4 (2–0)	29 – Moore	13 – Tolbert III	15 – Moore	Moby Arena (4,268); Fort Collins, CO
January 3, 2023; 6:00 p.m., MW Network		at Boise State	L 64–67	11–5 (2–1)	22 – Moore	7 – Moore	6 – Moore	ExtraMile Arena (8,113); Boise, ID
January 7, 2023; 1:00 p.m., MW Network		Nevada	L 40–67	11–6 (2–2)	10 – Moore	8 – Diallo	3 – Cardenas	Provident Credit Union Event Center (2,871); San Jose, CA
January 10, 2023; 7:00 p.m., NBCSBA		Fresno State	W 74–64	12–6 (3–2)	20 – Cardenas	8 – Diallo	9 – Cardenas	Provident Credit Union Event Center (2,084); San Jose, CA
January 17, 2023; 6:00 p.m., FS1		at New Mexico	L 57–77	12–7 (3–3)	24 – Moore	10 – Vaihola	6 – Cardenas	The Pit (11,519); Albuquerque, NM
January 21, 2023; 3:00 p.m., MW Network		at Utah State	L 74–75	12–8 (3–4)	20 – Görener	8 – Tolbert III	8 – Moore	Smith Spectrum (8,895); Logan, UT
January 24, 2023; 7:00 p.m., NBCSBA		Air Force	W 82–52	13–8 (4–4)	26 – Moore	10 – Vaihola	6 – Moore	Provident Credit Union Event Center (3,371); San Jose, CA
January 28, 2023; 6:00 p.m., FS1		at San Diego State	L 51–72	13–9 (4–5)	12 – Vaihola	7 – Moore	3 – Tied	Viejas Arena (12,414); San Diego, CA
February 4, 2023; 7:00 p.m., CBSSN		Wyoming	W 84–64	14–9 (5–5)	29 – Moore	10 – Diallo	6 – Moore	Provident Credit Union Event Center (2,609); San Jose, CA
February 7, 2023; 7:00 p.m., MW Network		at Fresno State	L 62–70	14–10 (5–6)	22 – Moore	10 – Tolbert III	5 – Moore	Save Mart Center (5,090); Fresno, CA
February 11, 2023; 7:00 p.m., CBSSN		Utah State	W 69–64	15–10 (6–6)	27 – Moore	8 – Vaihola	4 – Moore	Provident Credit Union Event Center (2,389); San Jose, CA
February 14, 2023; 7:00 p.m., MW Network		at UNLV	W 75–66	16–10 (7–6)	19 – Anderson	8 – Diallo	5 – Moore	Thomas & Mack Center (4,783); Paradise, NV
February 17, 2023; 7:30 p.m., CBSSN		New Mexico	L 68–96	16–11 (7–7)	18 – Moore	9 – Tied	3 – Moore	Provident Credit Union Event Center (2,917); San Jose, CA
February 21, 2023; 7:00 p.m., MW Network		at Nevada	L 51–66	16–12 (7–8)	14 – Görener	7 – Tied	6 – Cardenas	Lawlor Events Center (8,780); Reno, NV
February 25, 2023; 4:00 p.m., NBCSBA		Boise State	W 74–68 ^{OT}	17–12 (8–8)	24 – Moore	15 – Diallo	4 – Tied	Provident Credit Union Event Center (2,321); San Jose, CA
February 28, 2023; 8:00 p.m., CBSSN		Colorado State	W 63–46	18–12 (9–8)	16 – Cardenas	7 – Tied	5 – Cardenas	Provident Credit Union Event Center (2,347); San Jose, CA
March 4, 2023; 1:00 p.m., Altitude TV		at Air Force	W 63–61	19–12 (10–8)	33 – Moore	12 – Diallo	3 – Moore	Clune Arena (1,611); Colorado Springs, CO
Mountain West tournament
March 9, 2023; 2:30 pm, CBSSN	(5)	vs. (4) Nevada; Quarterfinals	W 81–77 ^{OT}	20–12	26 – Moore	8 – Vaihola	10 – Moore	Thomas & Mack Center; Paradise, NV
March 10, 2023; 6:30 pm, CBSSN	(5)	vs. (1) No. 20 San Diego State; Semifinals	L 49–64	20–13	15 – Gorener	8 – Diallo	6 – Cardenas	Thomas & Mack Center; Paradise, NV
College Basketball Invitational
March 18, 2023; 2:00 pm, FloHoops	(2)	vs. (15) Southern Indiana; First round	W 77–52	21–13	22 – Cardenas	9 – Vaihola	6 – Moore	Ocean Center; Daytona Beach, FL
March 20, 2023; 1:30 pm, FloHoops	(2)	vs. (10) Radford; Quarterfinals	L 57–67	21–14	17 – Moore	11 – Vaihola	5 – Tied	Ocean Center; Daytona Beach, FL
*Non-conference game. ^{#}Rankings from AP Poll. (#) Tournament seedings in parentheses. All times are in Pacific Time.
