= 2022–23 Nevada Wolf Pack men's basketball team =

American college basketball season

2022–23 Nevada Wolf Pack men's basketball

NCAA tournament, First Four
- Conference: Mountain West Conference
- Record: 22–11 (12–6 MW)
- Head coach: Steve Alford (4th season)
- Associate head coach: Craig Neal
- Assistant coaches: Kory Barnett; Bill Duany
- Home arena: Lawlor Events Center

2022–23 Mountain West Conference men's basketball standings
	Conf.				Overall
Team	W		L	PCT	W		L	PCT
No. 18 San Diego State †	15	–	3	.833	32	–	7	.821
Boise State	13	–	5	.722	24	–	10	.706
Utah State	13	–	5	.722	26	–	9	.743
Nevada	12	–	6	.667	22	–	11	.667
San Jose State	10	–	8	.556	21	–	14	.600
New Mexico	8	–	10	.444	22	–	12	.647
UNLV	7	–	11	.389	19	–	13	.594
Colorado State	6	–	12	.333	15	–	18	.455
Fresno State	6	–	12	.333	11	–	20	.355
Air Force	5	–	13	.278	14	–	18	.438
Wyoming	4	–	14	.222	9	–	22	.290
† Conference tournament winner Rankings from AP poll

The 2022–23 Nevada Wolf Pack men's basketball team represented the University of Nevada, Reno during the 2022–23 NCAA Division I men's basketball season. The Wolf Pack were led by fourth-year head coach Steve Alford and played their home games for the 40th season at the Lawlor Events Center in Reno, Nevada. They participated as members of the Mountain West Conference for the 11th season. They finished the season 22–9, 12–6 in Mountain West play to finish in fourth place. They were defeated by San Jose State in the quarterfinals of the Mountain West tournament. They received an at-large bid to the NCAA tournament as a No. 11 seed, where they lost in the first four play-in round to Arizona State.

== Previous season ==
The Wolf Pack finished the 2021–22 season 13–18, 6–12 in Mountain West play to finish in 8th place.

In the Mountain West tournament, the Wolf Pack defeated New Mexico 79–72 in the first round before losing to top-seeded Boise State 71–69 to end their season.

== Offseason ==
=== Departures ===
Name	Number	Pos.	Height	Weight	Year	Hometown	Reason for departure
Jalen Weaver	0	G	6'4"	185	Freshman	Aurora, CO	Entered transfer portal
AJ Bramah	2	G/F	6'7"	210	Senior	San Leandro, CA	Completed college eligibility
Alem Huseinovic	3	G	6'4"	190	Sophomore	Zenica, Bosnia and Herzegovina	Elected to transfer to Rice
Desmond Cambridge Jr.	4	G	6'4"	180	RS Senior	Nashville, TN	Elected to transfer to Arizona State
Warren Washington	5	F	7'0"	210	RS Junior	San Marcos, CA	Elected to transfer to Arizona State
Jason Mensah	21	G	5'11"	-	Freshman	Henderson, NV	Walk-on; Entered transfer portal
DeAndre Henry	23	F	6'7''	225	Sophomore	Phoenix, AZ	Elected to transfer to UC Davis
Grant Sherfield	25	G	6'2"	190	Junior	Fort Worth, TX	Elected to transfer to Oklahoma
Caleb Oden	30	F	6'5"	170	Freshman	Dublin, CA	Walk-on; Entered transfer portal

=== Incoming transfers ===
Name	Number	Pos.	Height	Weight	Year	Hometown	Previous School
Hunter McIntosh	0	G	6'2"	180	Senior	Snellville, GA	Transferred from Elon. McIntosh will be eligible to play immediately under the one-time transfer rule.
Tyler Powell	1	G/F	6'5''	220	Sophomore	Los Angeles, CA	Transferred from Seton Hall. Powell will be eligible to play immediately under the one-time transfer rule.
Jarod Lucas	2	G	6'4''	195	Senior	Hacienda Heights, CA	Transferred from Oregon State. Lucas will be eligible to play immediately under the one-time transfer rule.
Kenan Blackshear	13	G	6'6"	215	Senior	Orlando, FL	Transferred from Florida Atlantic. Blackshear will be eligible to play immediately under the one-time transfer rule.
Michael Folarin	23	C	6'11''	210	Sophomore	London, England	Transferred from Eastern Washington. Folarin will be eligible to play immediately under the one-time transfer rule.

=== 2022 recruiting class ===
College recruiting information
Name	Hometown	School	Height	Weight	Commit date
Trey Pettigrew; PG	Phoenix, AZ	Hillcrest Prep	6 ft 2 in (1.88 m)	175 lb (79 kg)	Nov 3, 2021
Trey Pettigrew; PG	Recruit ratings: Scout: Rivals: 247Sports: ESPN: (81)				
Darrion Williams; PF	Las Vegas, NV	Bishop Gorman HS	6 ft 6 in (1.98 m)	210 lb (95 kg)	Feb 4, 2022
Darrion Williams; PF	Recruit ratings: Scout: Rivals: 247Sports: ESPN: (81)				
Snookey Wigington; PG	Los Angeles, CA	Ribet Academy	5 ft 8 in (1.73 m)	140 lb (64 kg)	Aug 10, 2022
Snookey Wigington; PG	Recruit ratings: Scout: Rivals: 247Sports: ESPN: (N/A)				
Overall recruit ranking:
Note: In many cases, Scout, Rivals, 247Sports, On3, and ESPN may conflict in their listings of height and weight.; In these cases, the average was taken. ESPN grades are on a 100-point scale.; Sources: "2022 Nevada Basketball Commitments". Rivals.; "2022 Team Ranking". Rivals.

== Roster ==
2022–23 Nevada Wolf Pack men's basketball team
Players
Coaches

Pos.	#	Name	Height	Weight	Year	Previous school	Hometown
G	0	Hunter McIntosh	6 ft 2 in (1.88 m)	180 lb (82 kg)	Sr	Elon	Snellville, GA
G/F	1	Tyler Powell	6 ft 5 in (1.96 m)	220 lb (100 kg)	So	Seton Hall	Los Angeles, CA
G	2	Jarod Lucas	6 ft 4 in (1.93 m)	195 lb (88 kg)	Sr	Oregon State	Hacienda Heights, CA
G	3	Trey Pettigrew	6 ft 3 in (1.91 m)	175 lb (79 kg)	Fr	Kenwood Academy	Chicago, IL
F	5	Darrion Williams	6 ft 6 in (1.98 m)	210 lb (95 kg)	Fr	Bishop Gorman HS	Las Vegas, NV
G	10	Snookey Wigington	5 ft 8 in (1.73 m)	140 lb (64 kg)	Fr	Ribet Academy	Los Angeles, CA
F	11	Nick Davidson	6 ft 8 in (2.03 m)	210 lb (95 kg)	RS Fr	Mater Dei HS	Santa Ana, CA
G	13	Kenan Blackshear	6 ft 6 in (1.98 m)	215 lb (98 kg)	Sr	Florida Atlantic	Orlando, FL
F	14	Tré Coleman	6 ft 7 in (2.01 m)	185 lb (84 kg)	Jr	Jeffersonville HS	Jeffersonville, IN
G	20	Daniel Foster	6 ft 6 in (1.98 m)	185 lb (84 kg)	Jr	Golden State Prep	Melbourne, Australia
C	23	Michael Folarin	6 ft 11 in (2.11 m)	210 lb (95 kg)	So	Eastern Washington	London, England
F	34	John Flannigan (W)	6 ft 8 in (2.03 m)	175 lb (79 kg)	Fr	De La Salle HS	Concord, CA
F	42	K. J. Hymes Jr.	6 ft 10 in (2.08 m)	210 lb (95 kg)	RS Sr	Hillcrest Prep	Phoenix, AZ
C	50	Will Baker	7 ft 0 in (2.13 m)	245 lb (111 kg)	RS Jr	Texas	Austin, TX

Head coach

- Steve Alford (Indiana)

Assistant coach(es)

- Craig Neal (Georgia Tech)
- Kory Barnett (Indiana)
- Bill Duany (Indiana)

Legend

- (C) Team captain
- (S) Suspended
- (I) Ineligible
- (W) Walk-on
- Injured
- Current redshirt

Roster

== Schedule and results ==
Date time, TV	Rank^{#}	Opponent^{#}	Result	Record	High points	High rebounds	High assists	Site (attendance) city, state
Exhibition
Oct. 21, 2022; 4:30 p.m.		Cal State East Bay	W 96–59	-	– -	– -	– -	Lawlor Events Center (-); Reno, NV
Non-conference regular season
Nov. 7, 2022; 7:00 p.m.		Utah Tech	W 84–71	1–0	17 – Lucas	9 – Williams	7 – Blackshear	Lawlor Events Center (5,407); Reno, NV
Nov. 12, 2022; 2:00 p.m.		Grand Canyon	W 59–46	2–0	20 – Blackshear	6 – Blackshear	5 – Blackshear	Lawlor Events Center (5,705); Reno, NV
Nov. 15, 2022; 7:00 p.m.		William Jessup	W 98–54	3–0	19 – Lucas	11 – Williams	10 – Blackshear	Lawlor Events Center (4,904); Reno, NV
Nov. 18, 2022; 5:00 p.m., ESPN+		at UT Arlington	W 62–43	4–0	18 – Lucas	8 – Williams	4 – Blackshear	College Park Center (1,475); Arlington, TX
Nov. 21, 2022; 2:00 p.m., FloSports		vs. Tulane; Cayman Islands Classic Quarterfinals	W 75–66	5–0	22 – Lucas	10 – Blackshear	5 – Blackshear	John Gray Gymnasium; George Town, Cayman Islands
Nov. 22, 2022; 4:30 p.m., FloSports		vs. Kansas State; Cayman Islands Classic Semifinals	L 87–96 ^{OT}	5–1	20 – Lucas	5 – Baker	10 – Blackshear	John Gray Gymnasium (1,200); George Town, Cayman Islands
Nov. 23, 2022; 2:00 p.m., FloSports		vs. Akron; Cayman Islands Classic – 3rd Place	W 62–58	6–1	20 – Baker	10 – Williams	4 – Tied	John Gray Gymnasium; George Town, Cayman Islands
Nov. 28, 2022; 7:00 p.m.		Sam Houston	W 78–60	7–1	16 – Tied	10 – Williams	5 – Williams	Lawlor Events Center (-); Reno, NV
Dec. 3, 2022; 7:00 p.m., WCC Network		at Loyola Marymount	L 52–64	7–2	18 – Lucas	7 – Williams	4 – Williams	Gersten Pavilion (1,121); Los Angeles, CA
Dec. 6, 2022; 7:00 p.m., WCC Network		at Pepperdine	W 85–77	8–2	22 – Blackshear	8 – Davidson	4 – Blackshear	Firestone Fieldhouse (633); Malibu, CA
Dec. 10, 2022; 4:00 p.m., P12N		at Oregon	L 65–78	8–3	20 – Blackshear	6 – Tied	5 – Williams	Matthew Knight Arena (5,416); Eugene, OR
Dec. 14, 2022; 7:00 p.m.		UC San Diego	W 64–56	9–3	19 – Blackshear	10 – Williams	4 – Tied	Lawlor Events Center (6,693); Reno, NV
Dec. 21, 2022; 2:00 p.m.		Norfolk State	W 78–66	10–3	23 – Baker	11 – Williams	8 – Coleman	Lawlor Events Center (5,380); Reno, NV
Mountain West regular season
Dec. 28, 2022; 7:00 p.m.		Boise State	W 74–72	11–3 (1–0)	20 – Blackshear	7 – Coleman	5 – Blackshear	Lawlor Events Center (7,911); Reno, NV
Dec. 31, 2022; 11:00 a.m.		at Air Force	W 75–69	12–3 (2–0)	28 – Lucas	8 – Baker	4 – Blackshear	Clune Arena (1,704); Colorado Springs, CO
Jan. 4, 2023; 7:30 p.m., FS1		Colorado State	W 80–69	13–3 (3–0)	16 – Tied	7 – Williams	4 – Lucas	Lawlor Events Center (6,102); Reno, NV
Jan. 7, 2023; 1:00 p.m.		at San José State	W 67–40	14–3 (4–0)	15 – Davidson	10 – Williams	4 – Williams	Provident Credit Union Event Center (2,871); San Jose, CA
Jan. 10, 2023; 8:00 p.m., CBSSN		at No. 23 San Diego State	L 65–74	14–4 (4–1)	17 – Davidson	7 – Davidson	5 – Blackshear	Viejas Arena (12,183); San Diego, CA
Jan. 13, 2023; 8:00 p.m., FS1		Utah State	W 85–70	15–4 (5–1)	28 – Blackshear	6 – Baker	5 – Blackshear	Lawlor Events Center (7,315); Reno, NV
Jan. 17, 2023; 6:00 p.m.		at Boise State	L 62–77	15–5 (5–2)	15 – Lucas	10 – Williams	2 – Tied	ExtraMile Arena (9,653); Boise, ID
Jan. 23, 2023; 6:00 p.m., CBSSN		No. 25 New Mexico	W 97–94 ^{2OT}	16–5 (6–2)	28 – Baker	13 – Williams	9 – Coleman	Lawlor Events Center (8,292); Reno, NV
Jan. 28, 2023; 7:00 p.m., CBSSN		at UNLV; Battle for Nevada	L 62–68	16–6 (6–3)	15 – Lucas	10 – Baker	6 – Blackshear	Thomas & Mack Center (8,734); Paradise, NV
Jan. 31, 2023; 8:00 p.m., CBSSN		No. 22 San Diego State	W 75–66	17–6 (7–3)	26 – Lucas	9 – Baker	7 – Blackshear	Lawlor Events Center (9,357); Reno, NV
Feb. 3, 2023; 8:00 p.m., CBSSN		Air Force	W 72–52	18–6 (8–3)	19 – Lucas	8 – Baker	7 – Williams	Lawlor Events Center (10,186); Reno, NV
Feb. 7, 2023; 8:30 p.m., FS1		at New Mexico	W 77–76	19–6 (9–3)	28 – Lucas	7 – Davidson	6 – Foster	The Pit (15,004); Albuquerque, NM
Feb. 10, 2023; 8:00 p.m., FS1		Fresno State	W 77–66	20–6 (10–3)	19 – Tied	8 – Williams	7 – Blackshear	Lawlor Events Center (8,571); Reno, NV
Feb. 18, 2023; 5:00 p.m., CBSSN		at Utah State	L 66–75	20–7 (10–4)	25 – Baker	11 – Williams	6 – Blackshear	Smith Spectrum (9,157); Logan, UT
Feb. 21, 2023; 7:00 p.m., FS1		San José State	W 66–51	21–7 (11–4)	18 – Baker	7 – Blackshear	3 – Tied	Lawlor Events Center (8,780); Reno, NV
Feb. 24, 2023; 8:00 p.m., FS1		at Fresno State	W 60–56	22–7 (12–4)	13 – Baker	8 – Williams	6 – Blackshear	Save Mart Center (5,107); Fresno, CA
Feb. 27, 2023; 6:00 p.m., CBSSN		at Wyoming	L 71–80	22–8 (12–5)	24 – Lucas	7 – Williams	5 – Blackshear	Arena-Auditorium (4,520); Laramie, WY
Mar. 4, 2023; 2:00 p.m.		UNLV; Battle for Nevada	L 67–69 ^{OT}	22–9 (12–6)	23 – Lucas	12 – Williams	5 – Williams	Lawlor Events Center (11,327); Reno, NV
Mountain West tournament
March 9, 2023; 2:30 p.m., CBSSN	(4)	vs. (5) San Jose State; Quarterfinals	L 77–81 ^{OT}	22–10	28 – Lucas	8 – Davidson	4 – Coleman	Thomas & Mack Center; Paradise, NV
NCAA Tournament
March 15, 2023; 6:10 p.m., TruTV	(11 W)	vs. (11 W) Arizona State; First Four	L 73–98	22–11	17 – Baker	6 – Baker	7 – Blackshear	UD Arena (12,431); Dayton, OH
*Non-conference game. ^{#}Rankings from AP Poll. (#) Tournament seedings in parentheses. All times are in Pacific Time.
