= 2022–23 New Mexico Lobos men's basketball team =

American college basketball season

2022–23 New Mexico Lobos men's basketball

Lobo Classic Champions

NIT, First Round
- Conference: Mountain West Conference
- Record: 22–12 (8–10 MW)
- Head coach: Richard Pitino (2nd season)
- Assistant coaches: Isaac Chew; Eric Brown; Tarvish Felton
- Home arena: The Pit

2022–23 Mountain West Conference men's basketball standings
| | Conf. | | | | Overall |
| Team | W | | L | PCT | W | | L | PCT |
|---|---|---|---|---|---|---|---|---|
| No. 18 San Diego State † | 15 | – | 3 | .833 | 32 | – | 7 | .821 |
| Boise State | 13 | – | 5 | .722 | 24 | – | 10 | .706 |
| Utah State | 13 | – | 5 | .722 | 26 | – | 9 | .743 |
| Nevada | 12 | – | 6 | .667 | 22 | – | 11 | .667 |
| San Jose State | 10 | – | 8 | .556 | 21 | – | 14 | .600 |
| New Mexico | 8 | – | 10 | .444 | 22 | – | 12 | .647 |
| UNLV | 7 | – | 11 | .389 | 19 | – | 13 | .594 |
| Colorado State | 6 | – | 12 | .333 | 15 | – | 18 | .455 |
| Fresno State | 6 | – | 12 | .333 | 11 | – | 20 | .355 |
| Air Force | 5 | – | 13 | .278 | 14 | – | 18 | .438 |
| Wyoming | 4 | – | 14 | .222 | 9 | – | 22 | .290 |
† Conference tournament winner Rankings from AP poll

The 2022–23 New Mexico Lobos men's basketball team represented the University of New Mexico during the 2022–23 NCAA Division I men's basketball season. The Lobos were led by second-year head coach Richard Pitino and were members of the Mountain West Conference. They played their home games at The Pit.

New Mexico finished 22–12, with an 8–10 record in the Mountain West, finishing sixth in the conference. They defeated Wyoming in the first round of the Mountain West conference tournament before losing in the quarterfinals to Utah State. The Lobos were invited to the 2023 National Invitation Tournament, where they were upset in the first round by Utah Valley.

== Previous season ==
The Lobos finished the 2021–22 season 13–19, 5–12 in Mountain West play to finish in last place. As the No. 9 seed in the Mountain West tournament, they lost in the first round to Nevada 85–77.

== Offseason ==
=== Departures ===
| Name | Number | Pos. | Height | Weight | Year | Hometown | Reason for departure |
|---|---|---|---|---|---|---|---|
| Saquan Singleton | 1 | Guard | 6-6 | 190 | Senior | Bronx, NY | Transferred to George Mason. |
| Clay Patterson | 20 | Guard | 6-1 | 180 | Senior | Rio Rancho, NM | Graduated |
| Taryn Todd | 24 | Guard | 6-5 | 180 | Sophomore | Vaughn, Ontario | Transferred to Northwest Florida State College. |
| Jeremiah Francis III | 30 | Guard | 6-1 | 205 | Junior | Columbus, OH | Transferred to Emmanuel College. |
| Jordan Arroyo | 33 | Forward | 6-7 | 210 | Senior | Albuquerque, NM | Graduated |

=== Incoming transfers ===
| Name | Number | Pos. | Height | Weight | Year | Hometown | Previous college |
|---|---|---|---|---|---|---|---|
| Morris Udeze | 24 | Forward | 6-8 | 245 | Graduate | Houston, TX | Wichita State |
| Josiah Allick | 53 | Forward | 6-8 | 240 | Senior | Lincoln, NE | Kansas City |

=== 2022 recruiting class ===
College recruiting information
| Name | Hometown | School | Height | Weight | Commit date |
|---|---|---|---|---|---|
| Quinton Webb; F | San Diego, CA | San Ysidro | 6 ft 6 in (1.98 m) | 195 lb (88 kg) | Sep 6, 2021 |
| Quinton Webb; F | Recruit ratings: Scout: Rivals: 247Sports: ESPN: (N/A) | | | | |
| Donovan Dent; G | Corona, CA | Centennial (CA) | 6 ft 2 in (1.88 m) | 170 lb (77 kg) | Aug 16, 2021 |
| Donovan Dent; G | Recruit ratings: Scout: Rivals: 247Sports: ESPN: (N/A) | | | | |
| Braden Appelhans; G | Hudson, OH | Western Reserve Academy | 6 ft 6 in (1.98 m) | 180 lb (82 kg) | Aug 30, 2021 |
| Braden Appelhans; G | Recruit ratings: Scout: Rivals: 247Sports: ESPN: (N/A) | | | | |
Overall recruit ranking:
Note: In many cases, Scout, Rivals, 247Sports, On3, and ESPN may conflict in their listings of height and weight.; In these cases, the average was taken. ESPN grades are on a 100-point scale.; Sources:

== Roster ==
2022–23 New Mexico Lobos men's basketball team
Players
Coaches

| Pos. | # | Name | Height | Weight | Year | Previous school | Hometown |
|---|---|---|---|---|---|---|---|
| G | 0 | KJ Jenkins | 6 ft 2 in (1.88 m) | 175 lb (79 kg) | Sr | Kilgore College | Atlanta, GA |
| G | 1 | Braden Appelhans | 6 ft 7 in (2.01 m) | 180 lb (82 kg) | Fr | Western Reserve Academy | Blue Springs, MO |
| G | 2 | Donovan Dent | 6 ft 2 in (1.88 m) | 170 lb (77 kg) | Fr | Centennial High School | Corona, CA |
| C | 3 | Sebastian Forsling | 7 ft 0 in (2.13 m) | 240 lb (109 kg) | So | RIG Mark | Floda, Sweden |
| G | 4 | Emmanuel Kuac | 6 ft 7 in (2.01 m) | 200 lb (91 kg) | So | Kearns HS | Calgary, Alberta, Canada |
| G | 5 | Jamal Mashburn Jr. | 6 ft 2 in (1.88 m) | 185 lb (84 kg) | Jr | Minnesota | Miami, FL |
| G | 10 | Jaelen House | 6 ft 0 in (1.83 m) | 155 lb (70 kg) | Sr | Arizona State | Phoenix, AZ |
| G | 11 | Quinton Webb | 6 ft 6 in (1.98 m) | 195 lb (88 kg) | Fr | Etiwanda High School | San Bernardino, CA |
| F | 12 | Jay Allen-Tovar | 6 ft 9 in (2.06 m) | 217 lb (98 kg) | Sr | Salt Lake Community College | San Jose, CA |
| G | 13 | Javanté Johnson | 6 ft 6 in (1.98 m) | 190 lb (86 kg) | RS Jr | Cheyenne Mountain HS | Colorado Springs, CO |
| G | 23 | Safi Fino-A-Laself (W) | 5 ft 11 in (1.8 m) | 165 lb (75 kg) | Sr | Southwest Texas Junior College | Las Cruces, NM |
| F | 24 | Morris Udeze | 6 ft 8 in (2.03 m) | 245 lb (111 kg) | Sr | Wichita State | Houston, TX |
| F | 32 | Mac Manzanares (W) | 6 ft 5 in (1.96 m) | 190 lb (86 kg) | Fr | Sandia Prep | Albuquerque, NM |
| F | 34 | Birima Seck | 6 ft 11 in (2.11 m) | 200 lb (91 kg) | So | Dream City Christian School | Dakar, Senegal |
| F | 53 | Josiah Allick | 6 ft 8 in (2.03 m) | 240 lb (109 kg) | Sr | Kansas City | Lincoln, NE |

Head coach

- Richard Pitino (Providence)

Assistant coach(es)

- Isaac Chew (Avila)
- Eric Brown (Cal State Fullerton)
- Tarvish Felton (Southern Utah)

Legend

- (C) Team captain
- (S) Suspended
- (I) Ineligible
- (W) Walk-on
- Injured
- Current redshirt

Roster

== Schedule and results ==
| Date time, TV | Rank^{#} | Opponent^{#} | Result | Record | High points | High rebounds | High assists | Site (attendance) city, state |
Exhibition
| October 29, 2022*; 5:30 p.m. | | CSU Pueblo | W 85–53 | | 20 – House | 7 – Tied | 3 – House | The Pit (7,929); Albuquerque, NM |
Regular season
| November 7, 2022*; 7:00 p.m., MW Network | | Southern Utah | W 89–81 | 1–0 | 24 – Mashburn, Jr. | 7 – Allen-Tovar | 7 – House | The Pit (8,181); Albuquerque, NM |
| November 11, 2022*; 7:00 p.m., MW Network | | South Alabama | W 80–74 | 2–0 | 21 – Tied | 9 – Allick | 7 – House | The Pit (9,466); Albuquerque, NM |
| November 15, 2022*; 6:00 p.m., ESPN+ | | at SMU | W 84–63 | 3–0 | 18 – Tied | 9 – Allick | 7 – Dent | Moody Coliseum (3,662); University Park, TX |
| November 19, 2022*; 5:00 p.m., MW Network | | New Mexico State; Rio Grande Rivalry | Canceled | | | | | The Pit; Albuquerque, NM |
| November 25, 2022*; 5:00 p.m., MW Network | | Jacksonville State; Lobo Classic | W 79–61 | 4–0 | 22 – Udeze | 9 – Johnson | 7 – Dent | The Pit (9,033); Albuquerque, NM |
| November 26, 2022*; 5:00 p.m., MW Network | | North Dakota State; Lobo Classic | W 76–55 | 5–0 | 19 – Mashburn, Jr. | 9 – Allick | 6 – House | The Pit (8,715); Albuquerque, NM |
| November 27, 2022*; 5:30 p.m., MW Network | | Northern Colorado; Lobo Classic | W 98–74 | 6–0 | 33 – Udeze | 14 – Udeze | 4 – Dent | The Pit (8,434); Albuquerque, NM |
| November 30, 2022*; 8:00 p.m., WCC Network | | at Saint Mary's | W 69–65 | 7–0 | 17 – House | 7 – Allick | 2 – Tied | University Credit Union Pavilion (3,088); Moraga, CA |
| December 3, 2022*; 7:00 p.m., ESPN+ | | at New Mexico State; Rio Grande Rivalry | Canceled | | | | | Pan American Center; Las Cruces, NM |
| December 6, 2022*; 7:00 p.m., MW Network | | Western New Mexico | W 102–63 | 8–0 | 18 – Udeze | 13 – Allick | 7 – Tied | The Pit (8,329); Albuquerque, NM |
| December 10, 2022*; 2:00 p.m., MW Network | | UTSA | W 94–76 | 9–0 | 24 – Udeze | 8 – Udeze | 7 – House | The Pit (10,049); Albuquerque, NM |
| December 12, 2022*; 9:30 p.m. | | vs. San Francisco; Jack Jones Hoopsfest | W 67–64 | 10–0 | 23 – Mashburn, Jr. | 9 – Udeze | 4 – House | Michelob Ultra Arena; Paradise, NV |
| December 18, 2022*; 4:30 p.m., FS1 | | Iona | W 82–74 | 11–0 | 22 – House | 8 – Tied | 5 – Tied | The Pit (14,534); Albuquerque, NM |
| December 20, 2022*; 7:00 p.m., MW Network | | Prairie View A&M | W 94–63 | 12–0 | 17 – Mashburn, Jr. | 14 – Udeze | 9 – House | The Pit (9,425); Albuquerque, NM |
| December 28, 2022; 7:00 p.m., CBSSN | No. 22 | Colorado State | W 88–69 | 13–0 (1–0) | 26 – House | 13 – Udeze | 5 – House | The Pit (15,215); Albuquerque, NM |
| December 31, 2022; 2:00 p.m., FS1 | No. 22 | at Wyoming | W 76–75 | 14–0 (2–0) | 20 – Mashburn, Jr. | 15 – Allick | 5 – House | Arena-Auditorium (4,823); Laramie, WY |
| January 3, 2023; 9:00 p.m., CBSSN | No. 21 | at Fresno State | L 67–71 | 14–1 (2–1) | 22 – Mashburn, Jr. | 7 – Udeze | 2 – Tied | Save Mart Center (4,868); Fresno, CA |
| January 7, 2023; 7:30 p.m., CBSSN | No. 21 | UNLV | L 77–84 | 14–2 (2–2) | 22 – Udeze | 13 – Udeze | 4 – Dent | The Pit (15,424); Albuquerque, NM |
| January 9, 2023*; 7:00 p.m., MW Network | | Oral Roberts | W 82–75 | 15–2 | 24 – Mashburn, Jr. | 13 – Allick | 5 – House | The Pit (9,249); Albuquerque, NM |
| January 14, 2023; 7:00 p.m., CBSSN | | at No. 23 San Diego State; Rivalry | W 76–67 | 16–2 (3–2) | 29 – House | 15 – Udeze | 3 – Udeze | Viejas Arena (12,414); San Diego, CA |
| January 17, 2023; 7:00 p.m., FS1 | | San José State | W 77–57 | 17–2 (4–2) | 20 – Tied | 14 – Udeze | 5 – House | The Pit (11,519); Albuquerque, NM |
| January 20, 2023; 9:00 p.m., FS1 | | Boise State | W 81–79 ^{OT} | 18–2 (5–2) | 25 – Mashburn, Jr. | 18 – Allick | 4 – House | The Pit (14,566); Albuquerque, NM |
| January 23, 2023; 7:00 p.m., CBSSN | No. 25 | at Nevada | L 94–97 ^{2OT} | 18–3 (5–3) | 33 – Mashburn, Jr. | 10 – Udeze | 10 – House | Lawlor Events Center (8,292); Reno, NV |
| January 27, 2023; 8:00 p.m., CBSSN | No. 25 | Air Force | W 81–73 | 19–3 (6–3) | 24 – Mashburn, Jr. | 8 – Udeze | 4 – House | The Pit (15,143); Albuquerque, NM |
| February 1, 2023; 8:30 p.m., FS1 | | at Utah State | L 73–84 | 19–4 (6–4) | 17 – Mashburn, Jr. | 12 – Udeze | 3 – Tied | Smith Spectrum (8,851); Logan, UT |
| February 7, 2023; 8:30 p.m., FS1 | | Nevada | L 76–77 | 19–5 (6–5) | 21 – Mashburn, Jr. | 9 – Udeze | 6 – Mashburn, Jr. | The Pit (15,009); Albuquerque, NM |
| February 10, 2023; 7:00 p.m., FS1 | | at Air Force | L 77–89 | 19–6 (6–6) | 32 – Mashburn, Jr. | 9 – Udeze | 3 – Dent | Clune Arena (1,899); Colorado Springs, CO |
| February 14, 2023; 8:00 p.m., CBSSN | | Wyoming | L 56–70 | 19–7 (6–7) | 15 – Mashburn, Jr. | 17 – Udeze | 3 – Jenkins | The Pit (11,185); Albuquerque, NM |
| February 17, 2023; 8:30 p.m., CBSSN | | at San José State | W 96–68 | 20–7 (7–7) | 31 – Udeze | 12 – Udeze | 5 – House | Provident Credit Union Event Center (2,917); San Jose, CA |
| February 22, 2023; 8:30 p.m., FS1 | | at Boise State | L 77–82 | 20–8 (7–8) | 18 – Udeze | 14 – Udeze | 6 – House | ExtraMile Arena (9,825); Boise, ID |
| February 25, 2023; 8:00 p.m., CBSSN | | No. 22 San Diego State; Rivalry | L 71–73 | 20–9 (7–9) | 20 – Mashburn Jr. | 9 – Udeze | 5 – House | The Pit (15,431); Albuquerque, NM |
| February 28, 2023; 8:30 p.m., FS1 | | Fresno State | W 94–80 | 21–9 (8–9) | 25 – Udeze | 9 – Udeze | 5 – House | The Pit (12,520); Albuquerque, NM |
| March 3, 2023; 9:00 p.m., FS1 | | at Colorado State | L 84–92 | 21–10 (8–10) | 25 – Udeze | 8 – Allick | 5 – House | Moby Arena (4,936); Fort Collins, CO |
Mountain West tournament
| March 8, 2023; 4:00 pm, Stadium/MWN | (6) | vs. (11) Wyoming; First round | W 87–76 | 22–10 | 22 – Mashburn Jr. | 11 – Udeze | 6 – House | Thomas & Mack Center; Paradise, NV |
| March 9, 2023; 8:30 pm, CBSSN | (6) | vs. (3) Utah State; Quarterfinals | L 76–91 | 22–11 | 20 – Mashburn Jr. | 11 – Udeze | 6 – Dent | Thomas & Mack Center; Paradise, NV |
NIT
| March 15, 2023*; 8:00 p.m., ESPN+ | (2) | Utah Valley; First round – Rutgers bracket | L 69–83 | 22–12 | 18 – Udeze | 19 – Udeze | 5 – House | The Pit (6,803); Albuquerque, NM |
*Non-conference game. ^{#}Rankings from AP Poll. (#) Tournament seedings in parentheses. All times are in Mountain Time.

== Rankings ==
Ranking movements Legend: ██ Increase in ranking ██ Decrease in ranking — = Not ranked RV = Received votes т = Tied with team above or below
| | Week | | | | | | | | | | | | | | | | | | | | |
| Poll | Pre | 1 | 2 | 3 | 4 | 5 | 6 | 7 | 8 | 9 | 10 | 11 | 12 | 13 | 14 | 15 | 16 | 17 | 18 | 19 | Final |
|---|---|---|---|---|---|---|---|---|---|---|---|---|---|---|---|---|---|---|---|---|---|
| AP | — | — | — | — | RV | RV | RV | RV | 22т | 21 | RV | RV | 25 | RV | RV | — | — | — | — | — | Not released |
| Coaches | — | — | — | — | — | RV | RV | RV | RV | 22 | RV | RV | RV | RV | RV | — | — | — | — | — | — |

*AP does not release post-NCAA Tournament rankings.
