= 2022–23 Saint Mary's Gaels men's basketball team =

2022–23 Saint Mary's Gaels men's basketball

WCC regular season co-champions

NCAA tournament, Second Round
- Conference: West Coast Conference

Ranking
- Coaches: No. 22
- AP: No. 19
- Record: 27–8 (14–2 WCC)
- Head coach: Randy Bennett (22nd season)
- Assistant coaches: Joe Rahon; Justin Joyner; Mickey McConnell
- Home arena: University Credit Union Pavilion (Capacity: 3,500)

2022–23 West Coast Conference men's basketball standings
	Conf.				Overall
Team	W		L	PCT	W		L	PCT
No. 19 Saint Mary's	14	–	2	.875	27	–	8	.771
No. 9 Gonzaga†	14	–	2	.875	31	–	6	.838
Santa Clara	11	–	5	.688	23	–	10	.697
Loyola Marymount	9	–	7	.563	19	–	12	.613
San Francisco	7	–	9	.438	20	–	14	.588
BYU	7	–	9	.438	19	–	15	.559
Pacific	7	–	9	.438	15	–	18	.455
Portland	5	–	11	.313	14	–	19	.424
San Diego	4	–	12	.250	11	–	20	.355
Pepperdine	2	–	14	.125	9	–	22	.290
† 2023 WCC tournament winner Rankings from AP poll

The 2022–23 Saint Mary's Gaels men's basketball team represented Saint Mary's College of California during the 2022–23 NCAA Division I men's basketball season. The team was led by head coach Randy Bennett in his 22nd season at Saint Mary's. The Gaels played their home games at the University Credit Union Pavilion (Note: Formerly known as McKeon Pavilion.) in Moraga, California, as members of the West Coast Conference (WCC). They finished the season 27–8, 14–2 in WCC Play to finish a tie for 1st place. They defeated BYU in the semifinals of the WCC Tournament before losing to Gonzaga in the championship game. They received an at-large bid to the NCAA Tournament where they defeated VCU in the First Round before losing to UConn in the Second Round.

== Previous season ==
The Gaels finished the 2021–22 season 26–8, 12–3 in WCC play to finish in second place. In the WCC tournament, they defeated Santa Clara in the semifinals before losing to Gonzaga in the championship. They received an at-large bid to the NCAA tournament as the No. 5 seed in the East region. There they defeated Indiana in the first round before losing to UCLA in the second round.

== Offseason ==
=== Departures ===
Name	Number	Pos.	Height	Weight	Year	Hometown	Reason for departure
Yigit Arcan	1	G	6'2"	170	Freshman	Istanbul, Turkey	Walk-on; transferred
Quinn Clinton	2	G	6'3"	185	RS Junior	Christchurch, New Zealand	Left the team for personal reasons
Jabe Mullins	5	G	6'5"	190	Sophomore	Snoqualmie, WA	Transferred to Washington State
Matthias Tass	11	F/C	6'10"	245	Senior	Tallinn, Estonia	Graduated
Tommy Kuhse	12	G	6'2"	185	RS Senior	Mesa, AZ	Graduated
Judah Brown	25	F	6'6"	205	Sophomore	Bermuda Dunes, CA	Transferred to South Alabama
Dan Fotu	42	F	6'7"	225	Senior	Auckland, New Zealand	Graduated/Signed to play professionally with Auckland Tuatara

=== Incoming transfers ===
Name	Number	Pos.	Height	Weight	Year	Hometown	Previous school
Mason Forbes	25	F	6'9"	230	GS Senior	Folsom, CA	Harvard

=== 2022 recruiting class ===
College recruiting information
Name	Hometown	School	Height	Weight	Commit date
Aidan Mahaney; SG	Moraga, CA	Campolindo High School	6 ft 3 in (1.91 m)	175 lb (79 kg)	Sep 18, 2021
Aidan Mahaney; SG	Recruit ratings: Rivals: 247Sports: ESPN: (80)				
Joshua Jefferson; PF	Henderson, NV	Liberty High School	6 ft 7 in (2.01 m)	220 lb (100 kg)	Oct 15, 2021
Joshua Jefferson; PF	Recruit ratings: Scout: Rivals: ESPN: (0)				
Harry Wessels; C	Boddington, Australia	Australian Institute of Sport	7 ft 1 in (2.16 m)	220 lb (100 kg)	Aug 14, 2021
Harry Wessels; C	Recruit ratings: Scout: Rivals: ESPN: (0)				
Overall recruit ranking: Scout: nr Rivals: nr ESPN: nr
Note: In many cases, Scout, Rivals, 247Sports, On3, and ESPN may conflict in their listings of height and weight.; In these cases, the average was taken. ESPN grades are on a 100-point scale.; Sources: "ESPN". ESPN.; "2022 Team Ranking". Rivals.

== Roster ==
2022–23 Saint Mary's Gaels men's basketball team
Players
Coaches

Pos.	#	Name	Height	Weight	Year	Previous school	Hometown
G	0	Logan Johnson	6 ft 2 in (1.88 m)	177 lb (80 kg)	GS	Saint Francis HS; Cincinnati	Mountain View, California
C	1	Harry Wessels	7 ft 1 in (2.16 m)	255 lb (116 kg)	Fr	AIS Centre of Excellence	Boddington, WA, Australia
G	3	Augustas Marčiulionis	6 ft 4 in (1.93 m)	195 lb (88 kg)	So	Rytas Vilnius	Vilnius, Lithuania
F	5	Joshua Jefferson	6 ft 8 in (2.03 m)	220 lb (100 kg)	Fr	Liberty HS	Las Vegas, Nevada
C	11	Mitchell Saxen	6 ft 10 in (2.08 m)	242 lb (110 kg)	Jr	Ingraham HS	Seattle, Washington
G	12	Cade Bennett (W)	6 ft 0 in (1.83 m)	170 lb (77 kg)	Fr	Campolindo HS	Moraga, California
F	14	Kyle Bowen	6 ft 8 in (2.03 m)	222 lb (101 kg)	Sr	Centre of Excellence	Perth, Australia
G	15	Chris Howell	6 ft 6 in (1.98 m)	195 lb (88 kg)	RS Fr	Torrey Pines HS	San Diego, California
G	20	Aidan Mahaney	6 ft 3 in (1.91 m)	180 lb (82 kg)	Fr	Campolindo HS	Lafayette, California
C	22	Matt Van Komen	7 ft 4 in (2.24 m)	250 lb (113 kg)	RS Jr	Pleasant Grove HS; Utah	Pleasant Grove, Utah
G	23	Leemet Böckler	6 ft 7 in (2.01 m)	215 lb (98 kg)	Jr	Tallinn Tech	Tallinn, Estonia
F	24	Kevin Gad (W)	6 ft 6 in (1.98 m)	195 lb (88 kg)	Fr	Granada HS	Livermore, California
F	25	Mason Forbes	6 ft 9 in (2.06 m)	230 lb (104 kg)	Sr	Folsom HS; Harvard	Folsom, California
G/F	33	Luke Barrett (W)	6 ft 6 in (1.98 m)	200 lb (91 kg)	RS So	Piedmont HS	Piedmont, California
G/F	44	Alex Ducas	6 ft 6 in (1.98 m)	220 lb (100 kg)	Sr	AIS Centre of Excellence	Geraldton, Australia

Head coach

- Randy Bennett (UC San Diego)

Assistant coach(es)

- Justin Joyner (UC Santa Barbara)
- Mickey McConnell (Saint Mary's)
- Joe Rahon (Saint Mary's)

Legend

- (C) Team captain
- (S) Suspended
- (I) Ineligible
- (W) Walk-on
- Injured
- Current redshirt

Roster

== Schedule and results ==
Date time, TV	Rank^{#}	Opponent^{#}	Result	Record	High points	High rebounds	High assists	Site (attendance) city, state
Regular season
November 7, 2022*; 7:00 p.m., WCC Network		Oral Roberts	W 78–70	1–0	25 – Mahaney	11 – Bowen	5 – Saxen	University Credit Union Pavilion (3,219); Moraga, CA
November 10, 2022*; 7:00 p.m., WCC Network		Vermont	W 79–53	2–0	15 – Johnson	8 – Saxen	5 – Ducas	University Credit Union Pavilion (3,027); Moraga, CA
November 13, 2022*; 5:00 p.m., WCC Network		North Texas	W 63–33	3–0	11 – Ducas	12 – Saxen	4 – Marčiulionis	University Credit Union Pavilion (2,878); Moraga, CA
November 16, 2022*; 5:30 p.m., WCC Network		Southern	W 72–54	4–0	17 – Saxen	9 – Saxen	6 – Johnson	University Credit Union Pavilion (2,643); Moraga, CA
November 19, 2022*; 5:30 p.m., WCC Network		Hofstra	W 76–48	5–0	20 – Ducas	12 – Saxen	4 – Tied	University Credit Union Pavilion (3,274); Moraga, CA
November 23, 2022*; 9:00 p.m., ESPN2		vs. Vanderbilt; Wooden Legacy semifinals	W 75–65	6–0	20 – Mahaney	7 – Johnson	8 – Johnson	Anaheim Convention Center (2,483); Anaheim, CA
November 24, 2022*; 9:30 p.m., ESPN2		vs. Washington; Wooden Legacy championship	L 64–68 ^{OT}	6–1	19 – Saxen	8 – Saxen	4 – Bowen	Anaheim Convention Center (637); Anaheim, CA
November 30, 2022*; 7:00 p.m., WCC Network		New Mexico	L 65–69	6–2	25 – Ducas	9 – Saxen	3 – Johnson	University Credit Union Pavilion (3,088); Moraga, CA
December 3, 2022*; 6:30 p.m., ESPN2		vs. No. 1 Houston; The Battleground 2K22	L 48–53	6–3	17 – Johnson	12 – Bowen	5 – Johnson	Dickies Arena (2,812); Fort Worth, TX
December 7, 2022*; 7:00 p.m., WCC Network		Missouri State	W 66–46	7–3	19 – Saxen	8 – Bowen	3 – Johnson	University Credit Union Pavilion (2,863); Moraga, CA
December 10, 2022*; 12:00 p.m., ESPN+		vs. No. 22 San Diego State; Jerry Colangelo Classic	W 68–61	8–3	20 – Mahaney	9 – Saxen	3 – Saxen	Footprint Center; Phoenix, AZ
December 14, 2022*; 7:00 p.m., WCC Network		New Mexico State	W 81–68	9–3	16 – Bowen	11 – Saxen	4 – Johnson	University Credit Union Pavilion (2,844); Moraga, CA
December 18, 2022*; 5:00 p.m., WCC Network		Colorado State	L 60–62	9–4	15 – Mahaney	11 – Bowen	4 – Mahaney	University Credit Union Pavilion (3,188); Moraga, CA
December 21, 2022*; 5:30 p.m., ESPN+		vs. Wyoming; Jerry Colangelo Classic	W 66–54	10–4	28 – Johnson	9 – Saxen	5 – Mahaney	Footprint Center; Phoenix, AZ
December 29, 2022; 6:00 p.m., WCC Network		San Diego	W 85–58	11–4 (1–0)	20 – Saxen	13 – Bowen	4 – Johnson	University Credit Union Pavilion (3,500); Moraga, CA
December 31, 2022; 4:00 p.m., NBCSBA		at Santa Clara	W 67–64	12–4 (2–0)	18 – Mahaney	15 – Bowen	5 – Johnson	Leavey Center (1,379); Santa Clara, CA
January 3, 2023*; 7:00 p.m., WCC Network		Academy of Art	W 84–64	13–4	19 – Mahaney	15 – Bowen	6 – Johnson	University Credit Union Pavilion (2,702); Moraga, CA
January 7, 2023; 6:00 p.m., WCC Network		Portland	W 85–43	14–4 (3–0)	15 – Tied	14 – Saxen	4 – Bowen	University Credit Union Pavilion (3,500); Moraga, CA
January 12, 2023; 6:00 p.m., CBSSN		Loyola Marymount	W 76–62	15–4 (4–0)	25 – Mahaney	7 – Bowen	5 – Johnson	University Credit Union Pavilion (3,315); Moraga, CA
January 14, 2023; 8:00 p.m., NBCSBA		at San Francisco	W 78–61	16–4 (5–0)	24 – Johnson	7 – Johnson	6 – Johnson	War Memorial Gymnasium; San Francisco, CA
January 19, 2023; 8:00 p.m., ESPNU		at Pepperdine	W 73–44	17–4 (6–0)	17 – Johnson	9 – Johnson	7 – Marčiulionis	Firestone Fieldhouse (1,050); Malibu, CA
January 21, 2023; 5:00 p.m., NBCSBA		Santa Clara	W 77–58	18–4 (7–0)	20 – Mahaney	6 – Tied	4 – Johnson	University Credit Union Pavilion (3,500); Moraga, CA
January 28, 2023; 7:00 p.m., ESPN2	No. 22	at BYU	W 57–56	19–4 (8–0)	14 – Johnson	10 – Saxen	4 – Saxen	Marriott Center (15,843); Provo, UT
February 2, 2023; 8:00 p.m., ESPNU	No. 18	San Francisco	W 68–59	20–4 (9–0)	18 – Ducas	10 – Saxen	3 – Johnson	University Credit Union Pavilion (3,500); Moraga, CA
February 4, 2023; 7:30 p.m., ESPN	No. 18	No. 12 Gonzaga; Rivalry	W 78–70 ^{OT}	21–4 (10–0)	18 – Mahaney	11 – Saxen	3 – Tied	University Credit Union Pavilion (3,500); Moraga, CA
February 9, 2023; 7:00 p.m., NBCSBA	No. 15	at Loyola Marymount	L 74–78 ^{OT}	21–5 (10–1)	31 – Johnson	8 – Saxen	4 – Mahaney	Gersten Pavilion (1,775); Los Angeles, CA
February 11, 2023; 3:00 p.m., CBSSN	No. 15	at Portland	W 81–64	22–5 (11–1)	34 – Johnson	8 – Saxen	6 – Johnson	Chiles Center (2,454); Portland, OR
February 16, 2023; 6:00 p.m., NBCSBA	No. 17	at San Diego	W 62–59	23–5 (12–1)	17 – Saxen	10 – Saxen	4 – Saxen	Jenny Craig Pavilion (1,951); San Diego, CA
February 18, 2023; 7:00 p.m., ESPN2	No. 17	BYU	W 71–65	24–5 (13–1)	27 – Johnson	7 – Tied	2 – Tied	University Credit Union Pavilion (3,500); Moraga, CA
February 23, 2023; 7:00 p.m., WCC Network	No. 15	Pacific	W 83–52	25–5 (14–1)	29 – Johnson	7 – Ducas	7 – Johnson	University Credit Union Pavilion (3,500); Moraga, CA
February 25, 2023; 7:00 p.m., ESPN	No. 15	at No. 12 Gonzaga; Rivalry/College Gameday	L 68–77	25–6 (14–2)	27 – Johnson	7 – Ducas	3 – Tied	McCarthey Athletic Center (6,000); Spokane, WA
WCC tournament
March 6, 2023; 6:00 p.m., ESPN	(1) No. 16	vs. (5) BYU; Semifinals	W 75–69	26–6	23 –	7 – Tied	5 – Johnson	Orleans Arena; Paradise, NV
March 7, 2023; 6:00 p.m., ESPN	(1) No. 16	vs. (2) No. 9 Gonzaga; Championship/Rivalry	L 51–77	26–7	20 – Johnson	7 – Ducas	3 – Ducas	Orleans Arena; Paradise, NV
NCAA tournament
March 17, 2023*; 11:00 am, TBS	(5 W) No. 19	vs. (12 W) VCU; First Round	W 63–51	27–7	17 – Tied	10 – Johnson	4 – Tied	MVP Arena; Albany, NY
March 19, 2023*; 3:10 p.m., TNT	(5 W) No. 19	vs. (4 W) No. 10 UConn; Second Round	L 55–70	27–8	9 – Tied	7 – Johnson	4 – Johnson	MVP Arena (13,984); Albany, NY
*Non-conference game. ^{#}Rankings from AP Poll. (#) Tournament seedings in parentheses. All times are in Pacific Time.

== Rankings ==
Ranking movements Legend: ██ Increase in ranking ██ Decrease in ranking — = Not ranked RV = Received votes т = Tied with team above or below
	Week																				
Poll	Pre	1	2	3	4	5	6	7	8	9	10	11	12	13	14	15	16	17	18	19	Final
AP	—	RV	RV	—	—	RV	RV	RV	—	RV	RV	RV	22	18	15	17	15	17	16	19	Not released
Coaches	RV	RV	RV	RV	RV	RV	RV	RV	RV	RV	RV	24	22	18	14	17	14	16	16	19т	

*AP does not release post-NCAA Tournament rankings.
