= 2022–23 Utah State Aggies men's basketball team =

2022–23 Utah State Aggies men's basketball

NCAA tournament, first round
- Conference: Mountain West Conference
- Record: 26–9 (13–5 MW)
- Head coach: Ryan Odom (2nd season)
- Assistant coaches: Nate Dixon; Matt Henry; Bryce Crawford
- Home arena: Smith Spectrum

2022–23 Mountain West Conference men's basketball standings
	Conf.				Overall
Team	W		L	PCT	W		L	PCT
No. 18 San Diego State †	15	–	3	.833	32	–	7	.821
Boise State	13	–	5	.722	24	–	10	.706
Utah State	13	–	5	.722	26	–	9	.743
Nevada	12	–	6	.667	22	–	11	.667
San Jose State	10	–	8	.556	21	–	14	.600
New Mexico	8	–	10	.444	22	–	12	.647
UNLV	7	–	11	.389	19	–	13	.594
Colorado State	6	–	12	.333	15	–	18	.455
Fresno State	6	–	12	.333	11	–	20	.355
Air Force	5	–	13	.278	14	–	18	.438
Wyoming	4	–	14	.222	9	–	22	.290
† Conference tournament winner Rankings from AP poll

The 2022–23 Utah State Aggies men's basketball team represented Utah State University in the Mountain West Conference (MWC) during the 2022–23 NCAA Division I men's basketball season. Led by second-year head coach Ryan Odom, the Aggies played their home games on campus at the Smith Spectrum in Logan, Utah. They finished the season 26–9, 13–5 in MWC play, to finish in second place. They defeated New Mexico and Boise State in the MWC tournament to advance to the championship game, where they lost to San Diego State. The Aggies received an at-large bid to the NCAA tournament as the No. 10 seed in the South region. There they lost to Missouri.

On March 29, 2023, head coach Ryan Odom left the school to become the head coach at VCU. On April 7, the school named Montana State head coach Danny Sprinkle the team's new head coach.

== Previous season ==
The Aggies finished the 2021–22 season at 18–16 (8–10 in Mountain West, seventh place). In the conference tournament, they defeated Air Force in the first round, then lost to Colorado State in the quarterfinals. Utah State received an at-large bid to the National Invitation Tournament, but lost to Oregon in the first round.

== Offseason ==
=== Departures ===
Name	Number	Pos.	Height	Weight	Year	Hometown	Reason for departure
Travis Wagstaff	1	F	6' 7"	215	RS Sophomore	Salt Lake City, UT	Left the team for personal reasons
Brandon Horvath	4	F	6' 10"	210	GS Senior	West River, MD	Graduated
Norbert Thelissen	21	F	6' 7"	218	Sophomore	's-Hertogenbosch, Netherlands	Transferred
Brock Miller	22	G	6' 5"	200	RS Senior	Sandy, UT	Graduated
Justin Bean	34	F	6' 7"	210	RS Senior	Moore, OK	Graduated/undrafted in 2022 NBA draft; signed with the Los Angeles Clippers
Matthew Wickizer	35	F	6' 9"	210	Sophomore	North Salt Lake, UT	Walk-on; left the team for personal reasons

=== Incoming transfers ===
Name	Number	Pos.	Height	Weight	Year	Hometown	Previous college
Isaac Johnson	20	C	7' 0"	225	Sophomore	American Fork, UT	Oregon
Taylor Funk	23	F	6' 8"	215	GS Senior	Lancaster, PA	Saint Joseph's
Dan Akin	30	F	6' 9"	225	GS Senior	London, England	California Baptist

=== Recruiting classes ===
==== 2022 recruiting class ====
There were no incoming recruits for the class of 2022.

==== 2023 recruiting class ====
College recruiting (2023)
Name	Hometown	School	Height	Weight	Commit date
Garrison Phelps; SG	Phoenix, AZ	Link Academy	6 ft 6 in (1.98 m)	180 lb (82 kg)	Oct 15, 2022
Garrison Phelps; SG	Recruit ratings: Rivals: 247Sports: (0)				
Dallin Grant; SF	Cedar City, UT	Cedar City High School	6 ft 7 in (2.01 m)	200 lb (91 kg)	Sep 23, 2020
Dallin Grant; SF	Recruit ratings: Rivals: 247Sports: (0)				
Overall recruit ranking: Scout: – Rivals: – 247Sports: #65
Note: In many cases, Scout, Rivals, 247Sports, On3, and ESPN may conflict in their listings of height and weight.; In these cases, the average was taken. ESPN grades are on a 100-point scale.; Sources: "2023 Team Ranking". Rivals.

== Roster ==
2022–23 Utah State Aggies men's basketball team
Players
Coaches

Pos.	#	Name	Height	Weight	Year	Previous school	Hometown
G	0	Landon Brenchley (W)	6 ft 4 in (1.93 m)	215 lb (98 kg)	RS Fr	Ridgeline HS	Providence, UT
G	2	Sean Bairstow	6 ft 8 in (2.03 m)	190 lb (86 kg)	Sr	Churchie	Brisbane, Australia
G	3	Steven Ashworth	6 ft 1 in (1.85 m)	170 lb (77 kg)	Jr	Lone Peak HS	Alpine, UT
G	5	RJ Eytle-Rock	6 ft 4 in (1.93 m)	225 lb (102 kg)	RS Sr	Barking Abbey School; UMBC	London, England
F	10	Cade Potter	6 ft 8 in (2.03 m)	230 lb (104 kg)	RS Fr	Orange Lutheran HS	Orange, CA
F	11	Max Shulga	6 ft 4 in (1.93 m)	197 lb (89 kg)	Jr	Basketball School of Excellence	Kyiv, Ukraine
C	12	Szymon Zapala	6 ft 11 in (2.11 m)	240 lb (109 kg)	Jr	SMS PZkosz Wladyslawowo	Zaborze, Poland
G	13	Conner Gillis (W)	6 ft 2 in (1.88 m)	150 lb (68 kg)	Jr	Gaston Christian HS	Charlotte, NC
G	14	Connor Odom (W)	5 ft 11 in (1.8 m)	165 lb (75 kg)	Jr	Archbishop Spalding HS	Annapolis, MD
G	15	Rylan Jones	6 ft 0 in (1.83 m)	178 lb (81 kg)	Sr	Olympus HS; Utah	Salt Lake City, UT
C	20	Isaac Johnson	7 ft 0 in (2.13 m)	225 lb (102 kg)	So	American Fork HS; Oregon	American Fork, UT
G	21	Mason Falslev (W)	6 ft 3 in (1.91 m)	190 lb (86 kg)	Fr	Sky View HS	Benson, UT
F	23	Taylor Funk	6 ft 9 in (2.06 m)	220 lb (100 kg)	GS	Manheim Central HS; Saint Joseph's	Lancaster, PA
F	24	Zee Hamoda	6 ft 7 in (2.01 m)	170 lb (77 kg)	So	Bridgton Academy	Riffa, Bahrain
F	30	Dan Akin	6 ft 9 in (2.06 m)	225 lb (102 kg)	GS	Barking Abbey School; California Baptist	London, England
C	32	Trevin Dorius	7 ft 0 in (2.13 m)	240 lb (109 kg)	RS Sr	Wasatch HS	Heber City, UT

Head coach

- Ryan Odom (Hampden–Sydney)

Assistant coach(es)

- Nate Dixon (UNC Wilmington)
- Matt Henry (Trinity)
- Bryce Crawford (Ohio State)

Legend

- (C) Team captain
- (S) Suspended
- (I) Ineligible
- (W) Walk-on
- Injured
- Current redshirt

Roster
Last update: November 18, 2024

== Schedule and results ==
Date time, TV	Rank^{#}	Opponent^{#}	Result	Record	High points	High rebounds	High assists	Site (attendance) city, state
Non-conference regular season
November 7, 2022*; 7:00 p.m., MW Network		Utah Valley	W 75–58	1–0	19 – Bairstow	14 – Funk	8 – Jones	Smith Spectrum (7,430); Logan, UT
November 11, 2022*; 7:00 p.m., MW Network		Bradley	W 84–62	2–0	28 – Ashworth	11 – Akin	6 – Ashworth	Smith Spectrum (6,875); Logan, UT
November 14, 2022*; 7:00 p.m., MW Network		Santa Clara	W 96–74	3–0	22 – Funk	11 – Funk	8 – Jones	Smith Spectrum (6,549); Logan, UT
November 17, 2022*; 8:00 p.m., WCC Network		at San Diego	W 91–89 ^{OT}	4–0	21 – Akin	15 – Akin	9 – Ashworth	Jenny Craig Pavilion (954); San Diego, CA
November 22, 2022*; 7:00 p.m., MW Network		Oral Roberts	W 95–85	5–0	30 – Ashworth	10 – Shulga	7 – tied	Smith Spectrum (5,980); Logan, UT
December 1, 2022*; 7:00 p.m., MW Network		Utah Tech	W 86–81	6–0	27 – Ashworth	8 – Funk	10 – Shulga	Smith Spectrum (6,777); Logan, UT
December 4, 2022*; 6:30 p.m.		vs. San Francisco	W 82–64	7–0	19 – Akin	7 – tied	4 – Shulga	Chase Center; San Francisco, CA
December 10, 2022*; 10:30 p.m.		vs. Loyola Marymount; Jack Jones Hoopfest	W 79–67	8–0	18 – Shulga	10 – Funk	6 – Bairstow	Michelob Ultra Arena; Paradise, NV
December 15, 2022*; 7:00 p.m., MW Network		Westminster (UT)	W 106–68	9–0	28 – Hamoda	5 – Bairstow	8 – Shulga	Smith Spectrum (6,047); Logan, UT
December 19, 2022*; 7:00 p.m., MW Network		Weber State	L 72–75	9–1	16 – Ashworth	10 – Akin	5 – tied	Smith Spectrum (7,000); Logan, UT
December 22, 2022*; 3:30 p.m., ESPNU		vs. Seattle; Diamond Head Classic quarterfinals	W 84–56	10–1	17 – Ashworth	10 – Shulga	4 – tied	Stan Sheriff Center (4,333); Honolulu, HI
December 23, 2022*; 5:00 p.m., ESPN2		vs. SMU; Diamond Head Classic semifinals	L 74–77	10–2	18 – Shulga	9 – Dorius	4 – Shulga	Stan Sheriff Center (4,070); Honolulu, HI
December 25, 2022*; 4:30 p.m., ESPN2		vs. Washington State; Diamond Head Classic 3rd-place game	W 82–73	11–2	12 – tied	5 – Bairstow	5 – Ashworth	Stan Sheriff Center; Honolulu, HI
Mountain West regular season
December 31, 2022; 12:00 p.m., CBSSN		Fresno State	W 67–54	12–2 (1–0)	13 – Ashworth	13 – Akin	3 – Bairstow	Smith Spectrum (6,933); Logan, UT
January 3, 2023; 7:00 p.m., CBSSN		at Air Force	W 77–65	13–2 (2–0)	16 – Funk	8 – Ashworth	4 – Bairstow	Clune Arena (1,461); Colorado Springs, CO
January 7, 2023; 4:30 p.m., FS1		at Boise State	L 59–82	13–3 (2–1)	14 – Funk	6 – Shulga	4 – Ashworth	ExtraMile Arena (12,007); Boise, ID
January 10, 2023; 8:30 p.m., FS1		Wyoming	W 83–63	14–3 (3–1)	22 – Funk	15 – Akin	7 – Ashworth	Smith Spectrum (7,890); Logan, UT
January 13, 2023; 9:00 p.m., FS1		at Nevada	L 70–85	14–4 (3–2)	15 – Ashworth	9 – Funk	6 – Shulga	Lawlor Events Center (7,315); Reno, NV
January 17, 2023; 7:00 p.m., MW Network		UNLV	W 75–71	15–4 (4–2)	20 – Funk	9 – Akin	9 – Ashworth	Smith Spectrum (7,611); Logan, UT
January 21, 2023; 4:00 p.m., MW Network		San José State	W 75–74	16–4 (5–2)	19 – Ashworth	7 – Akin	6 – tied	Smith Spectrum (8,895); Logan, UT
January 25, 2023; 9:00 p.m., CBSSN		at San Diego State	L 75–85	16–5 (5–3)	22 – Funk	10 – Akin	7 – Ashworth	Viejas Arena (12,239); San Diego, CA
January 28, 2023; 5:00 p.m., MW Network		at Fresno State	W 70–53	17–5 (6–3)	23 – Akin	8 – tied	6 – Ashworth	Save Mart Center (6,817); Fresno, CA
February 1, 2023; 8:30 p.m., FS1		New Mexico	W 84–73	18–5 (7–3)	20 – Bairstow	7 – Funk	5 – Akin	Smith Spectrum (8,851); Logan, UT
February 4, 2023; 6:00 p.m., CBSSN		at Colorado State	W 88–79	19–5 (8–3)	26 – Ashworth	6 – tied	9 – Bairstow	Moby Arena (6,018); Fort Collins, CO
February 8, 2023; 8:00 p.m., CBSSN		No. 25 San Diego State	L 61–63	19–6 (8–4)	18 – Ashworth	9 – Funk	6 – Ashworth	Smith Spectrum (8,765); Logan, UT
February 11, 2023; 8:00 p.m., CBSSN		at San José State	L 64–69	19–7 (8–5)	14 – Ashworth	7 – Bairstow	5 – tied	Provident Credit Union Event Center (2,389); San Jose, CA
February 14, 2023; 7:00 p.m., MW Network		Air Force	W 80–65	20–7 (9–5)	29 – Shulga	7 – tied	3 – tied	Smith Spectrum (6,935); Logan, UT
February 18, 2023; 6:00 p.m., CBSSN		Nevada	W 75–66	21–7 (10–5)	20 – Ashworth	10 – tied	6 – Ashworth	Smith Spectrum (9,157); Logan, UT
February 21, 2023; 7:00 p.m., CBSSN		at Wyoming	W 65–55	22–7 (11–5)	19 – Ashworth	7 – Ashworth	3 – tied	Arena-Auditorium (3,894); Laramie, WY
March 1, 2023; 9:00 p.m., CBSSN		at UNLV	W 91–66	23–7 (12–5)	27 – Ashworth	10 – Bairstow	7 – Ashworth	Thomas & Mack Center (5,747); Paradise, NV
March 4, 2023; 7:00 p.m., MW Network		Boise State	W 86–73	24–7 (13–5)	24 – Funk	8 – Funk	8 – Ashworth	Smith Spectrum (9,963); Logan, UT
Mountain West tournament
March 9, 2023; 8:30 p.m., CBSSN	(3)	vs. (6) New Mexico; Quarterfinals	W 91–76	25–7	32 – Funk	8 – Akin	5 – tied	Thomas & Mack Center; Paradise, NV
March 10, 2023; 9:00 p.m., CBSSN	(3)	vs. (2) Boise State; Semifinals	W 72–62	26–7	19 – Shulga	10 – Funk	5 – Shulga	Thomas & Mack Center; Paradise, NV
March 11, 2023; 3:00 p.m., CBS/Paramount+	(3)	vs. (1) No. 20 San Diego State; Championship	L 57–62	26–8	13 – Ashworth	8 – Akin	3 – tied	Thomas & Mack Center; Paradise, NV
NCAA tournament
March 16, 2023; 11:40 a.m., TNT	(10 S)	vs. (7 S) No. 23 Missouri; First round	L 65–76	26–9	16 – Funk	7 – Funk	4 – Ashworth	Golden 1 Center; Sacramento, CA
*Non-conference game. ^{#}Rankings from AP poll. (#) Tournament seedings in parentheses. S=South. All times are in Mountain.

== See also ==
- 2022–23 Utah State Aggies women's basketball team
