= 2023 Mountain West Conference men's basketball tournament =

American college basketball competition

- Classification: Division I
- Season: 2022–23
- Teams: 11
- Site: Thomas & Mack Center; Paradise, Nevada
- Champions: San Diego State (7th title)
- Winning coach: Brian Dutcher (3rd title)
- MVP: Matt Bradley (San Diego State)
- Television: Stadium/MWN, CBSSN, CBS/Paramount+

2022–23 Mountain West Conference men's basketball standings
	Conf.				Overall
Team	W		L	PCT	W		L	PCT
No. 18 San Diego State †	15	–	3	.833	32	–	7	.821
Boise State	13	–	5	.722	24	–	10	.706
Utah State	13	–	5	.722	26	–	9	.743
Nevada	12	–	6	.667	22	–	11	.667
San Jose State	10	–	8	.556	21	–	14	.600
New Mexico	8	–	10	.444	22	–	12	.647
UNLV	7	–	11	.389	19	–	13	.594
Colorado State	6	–	12	.333	15	–	18	.455
Fresno State	6	–	12	.333	11	–	20	.355
Air Force	5	–	13	.278	14	–	18	.438
Wyoming	4	–	14	.222	9	–	22	.290
† Conference tournament winner Rankings from AP poll

The 2023 Mountain West Conference men's basketball tournament was the postseason men's basketball tournament for the Mountain West Conference. It was held March 8–11, 2023, at the Thomas & Mack Center on the campus of University of Nevada, Las Vegas, in Paradise, Nevada. The tournament champion received the conference's automatic bid to the NCAA tournament.

== Seeds ==
The defending champions from the prior season were the Boise State Broncos.

All 11 Mountain West schools participated in the tournament. Teams were seeded by conference record with a tiebreaker system to seed teams with identical percentages. The top five teams received byes into the tournament quarterfinals. The remaining teams played in the first round. Tie-breaking procedures remained unchanged since the 2020 tournament.

- Head-to-head record between the tied teams
- Record against the highest-seeded team not involved in the tie, going down through the seedings as necessary
- Higher NET

Seed	School	Conf	Tiebreaker(s)
1	San Diego State	15–3	
2	Boise State	13–5	1–1 vs SDSU
3	Utah State	13–5	0–2 vs SDSU
4	Nevada	12–6	
5	San Jose State	10–8	
6	New Mexico	8–10	
7	UNLV	7–11	
8	Colorado State	6–12	2–0 vs FSU
9	Fresno State	6–12	0–2 vs CSU
10	Air Force	5–13	
11	Wyoming	4–14	

== Schedule ==
Game	Time	Matchup	Score	Television	Attendance
First round – Wednesday, March 8
1	11:00 am	No. 8 Colorado State vs. No. 9 Fresno State	67–65	Stadium/MWN	
2	1:30 pm	No. 7 UNLV vs. No. 10 Air Force	78–70^{OT}	Stadium/MWN	
3	4:00 pm	No. 6 New Mexico vs. No. 11 Wyoming	87–76	Stadium/MWN	
Quarterfinals – Thursday, March 9
4	12:00 pm	No. 1 San Diego State vs. No. 8 Colorado State	64–61	CBSSN	
5	2:30 pm	No. 4 Nevada vs. No. 5 San Jose State	77-81^{OT}	CBSSN	
6	6:00 pm	No. 2 Boise State vs. No. 7 UNLV	87-76^{OT}	CBSSN	
7	8:30 pm	No. 3 Utah State vs. No. 6 New Mexico	91-76	CBSSN	
Semifinals – Friday, March 10
8	6:30 pm	No. 1 San Diego State vs. No. 5 San Jose State	64-49	CBSSN	
9	9:00 pm	No. 2 Boise State vs. No. 3 Utah State	62-72	CBSSN	
Championship – Saturday, March 11
10	3:00 pm	No. 1 San Diego State vs. No. 3 Utah State	62-57	CBS/Paramount+	
Game times in PT. Rankings denote tournament seeding.

== Bracket ==
First round Wednesday, March 8 Stadium/MWN
8	Colorado State	67
9	Fresno State	65
7	UNLV	78*
10	Air Force	70
6	New Mexico	87
11	Wyoming	76

Quarterfinals; Thursday, March 9 CBSSN
1	San Diego State	64
8	Colorado State	61
4	Nevada	77
5	San Jose State	81*
2	Boise State	87*
7	UNLV	76
3	Utah State	91
6	New Mexico	76

Semifinals; Friday, March 10; CBSSN
1	San Diego State	64
5	San Jose State	49
2	Boise State	62
3	Utah State	72

Championship; Saturday, March 11; CBS/Paramount+
1	San Diego State	62
3	Utah State	57

* denotes overtime period
