= 2022–23 Wyoming Cowboys basketball team =

American college basketball season

2022–23 Wyoming Cowboys basketball
- Conference: Mountain West Conference
- Record: 9–22 (4–14 MW)
- Head coach: Jeff Linder (3rd season)
- Assistant coaches: Ken DeWeese; Shaun Vandiver; Sundance Wicks
- Home arena: Arena-Auditorium

2022–23 Mountain West Conference men's basketball standings
	Conf.				Overall
Team	W		L	PCT	W		L	PCT
No. 18 San Diego State †	15	–	3	.833	32	–	7	.821
Boise State	13	–	5	.722	24	–	10	.706
Utah State	13	–	5	.722	26	–	9	.743
Nevada	12	–	6	.667	22	–	11	.667
San Jose State	10	–	8	.556	21	–	14	.600
New Mexico	8	–	10	.444	22	–	12	.647
UNLV	7	–	11	.389	19	–	13	.594
Colorado State	6	–	12	.333	15	–	18	.455
Fresno State	6	–	12	.333	11	–	20	.355
Air Force	5	–	13	.278	14	–	18	.438
Wyoming	4	–	14	.222	9	–	22	.290
† Conference tournament winner Rankings from AP poll

The 2022–23 Wyoming Cowboys basketball team represented the University of Wyoming during the 2022–23 NCAA Division I men's basketball season. The Cowboys were led by third-year head coach Jeff Linder and played their home games for the 41st season at Arena-Auditorium in Laramie, Wyoming. They participated as members of the Mountain West Conference for the 24th season.

== Previous season ==
The Cowboys finished the 2021–22 season 25–9, 13–5 in Mountain West play to finish in fourth place. In the Mountain West tournament, the Cowboys defeated UNLV in the quarterfinals before losing to Boise State. The Cowboys received an at-large bid to the NCAA Tournament for the first time since 2015 as a No. 12 seed. They were defeated by Indiana in the First Four.

The team also spent time ranked in the AP Poll for the first time since 2015. They were ranked #22 for the week of February 14.

== Offseason ==
=== Departures ===
Name	Number	Pos.	Height	Weight	Year	Hometown	Reason for departure
Drake Jeffries	0	G	6'5"	186	RS Senior	Mattoon, IL	Declared for 2022 NBA draft
Deng Dut	2	G	6'4"	192	Junior	Melbourne, Australia	Elected to transfer to Southern Utah
Eoin Nelson	11	F	6'10"	229	Junior	Dublin, Ireland	Elected to transfer to North Alabama
Ben Bowen	40	G	6'5"	170	Freshman	Highlands Ranch, CO	Elected to transfer to Denver
John Grigsby	55	F	6'9"	211	Sophomore	Louisville, CO	Elected to transfer to Concordia

=== Incoming transfers ===
Name	Number	Pos.	Height	Weight	Year	Hometown	Previous School
Jake Kyman	13	G	6'7"	213	Junior	Aliso Viejo, CA	Transferred from UCLA. Kyman will be eligible to play immediately under the one-time transfer rule.
Ethan Anderson	20	F	6'1''	208	Junior	Los Angeles, CA	Transferred from USC. Anderson will be eligible to play immediately under the one-time transfer rule.
Max Agbonkpolo	23	G/F	6'9''	196	Junior	Laguna Niguel, CA	Transferred from USC. Agbonkpolo will be eligible to play immediately under the one-time transfer rule.

=== 2022 recruiting class ===
College recruiting information
Name	Hometown	School	Height	Weight	Commit date
Caden Powell; C	Waco, TX	Midway HS	6 ft 10 in (2.08 m)	206 lb (93 kg)	Sep 8, 2021
Caden Powell; C	Recruit ratings: Scout: Rivals: 247Sports: ESPN: (N/A)				
Overall recruit ranking:
Note: In many cases, Scout, Rivals, 247Sports, On3, and ESPN may conflict in their listings of height and weight.; In these cases, the average was taken. ESPN grades are on a 100-point scale.; Sources: "2022 Wyoming Basketball Commitments". Rivals.; "2022 Team Ranking". Rivals.

== Roster ==
2021–22 Wyoming Cowboys men's basketball team
Players
Coaches

Pos.	#	Name	Height	Weight	Year	Previous school	Hometown
G	0	Nathanial Talich (W)	6 ft 4 in (1.93 m)	191 lb (87 kg)	Fr	Cheyenne Central HS	Cheyenne, WY
G	1	Brendan Wenzel	6 ft 7 in (2.01 m)	204 lb (93 kg)	Jr	Utah	San Antonio, TX
F	10	Hunter Thompson	6 ft 10 in (2.08 m)	230 lb (104 kg)	RS Sr	Pine Bluffs HS	Pine Bluffs, WY
G/F	13	Jake Kyman	6 ft 7 in (2.01 m)	213 lb (97 kg)	Jr	UCLA	Aliso Viejo, CA
F	15	Nate Barnhart	7 ft 0 in (2.13 m)	190 lb (86 kg)	RS Fr	DeSoto HS	Lenexa, KS
G	20	Ethan Anderson	6 ft 1 in (1.85 m)	208 lb (94 kg)	Jr	USC	Los Angeles, CA
G	21	Noah Reynolds	6 ft 3 in (1.91 m)	195 lb (88 kg)	So	Notre Dame HS	Peoria, IL
G	22	Kenny Foster	6 ft 5 in (1.96 m)	187 lb (85 kg)	Sr	Smoky Hill HS	Aurora, CO
G/F	23	Max Agbonkpolo	6 ft 9 in (2.06 m)	196 lb (89 kg)	Jr	USC	Laguna Niguel, CA
G	24	Hunter Maldonado	6 ft 7 in (2.01 m)	202 lb (92 kg)	RS Sr	Vista Ridge HS	Colorado Springs, CO
F	25	Jeremiah Oden	6 ft 8 in (2.03 m)	201 lb (91 kg)	Jr	Sunrise Christian Academy	Chicago, IL
G	31	Cort Roberson (W)	6 ft 0 in (1.83 m)	157 lb (71 kg)	RS Fr	Stanwood HS	Arlington, WA
F	33	Graham Ike (redshirt)	6 ft 9 in (2.06 m)	255 lb (116 kg)	Jr	Overland HS	Aurora, CO
F	44	Caden Powell	6 ft 10 in (2.08 m)	206 lb (93 kg)	Fr	Midway HS	Waco, TX
G	53	Xavier DuSell	6 ft 4 in (1.93 m)	199 lb (90 kg)	Jr	Arizona Compass Prep	Scottsdale, AZ

Head coach

- Jeff Linder (Western Colorado)

Assistant coach(es)

- Ken DeWeese (Mary Hardin–Baylor)
- Shaun Vandiver (Colorado)
- Sundance Wicks (Northern State)

Legend

- (C) Team captain
- (S) Suspended
- (I) Ineligible
- (W) Walk-on
- Injured
- Current redshirt

Roster

== Statistics ==
Player	GP	GS	MPG	FG%	3FG%	FT%	RPG	APG	SPG	BPG	PPG
Max Agbonkpolo	16	6	16.0	.376	.300	.688	2.8	0.8	0.6	0.4	5.4
Ethan Anderson	21	17	24.9	.540	.313	.466	4.3	2.9	0.3	0.2	7.9
Nate Barnhart	20	3	11.2	.568	.357	.714	1.9	0.3	0.3	0.5	2.6
Xavier DuSell	31	20	26.0	.398	.422	.700	2.6	0.5	0.7	0.1	8.0
Kenny Foster	17	3	18.0	.547	.300	.739	2.4	0.4	0.2	0.1	4.8
Jake Kyman	18	1	12.6	.367	.268	1.000	1.6	0.6	0.4	0.1	4.5
Hunter Maldonado	29	29	34.6	.481	.338	.753	4.8	4.0	1.4	0.3	15.6
Jeremiah Oden	30	19	24.6	.443	.344	.697	3.6	0.8	0.6	0.5	9.6
Caden Powell	28	0	8.5	.462	.000	.586	2.0	0.2	0.2	0.3	1.9
Noah Reynolds	19	10	24.9	.481	.329	.662	2.2	2.1	0.4	0.2	14.5
Cort Roberson	4	0	1.5	.000	.000	.750	0.3	0.0	0.0	0.3	0.8
Hunter Thompson	26	26	28.2	.342	.303	.853	5.5	1.0	0.5	0.5	6.6
Brendan Wenzel	24	21	28.8	.370	.406	.884	3.8	0.9	0.5	0.3	7.9

== Preseason ==
=== Greek Tour ===
The team went on a 10-day foreign tour of Greece from July 24 to August 4. NCAA rules allow programs to take international tours once every 4 years; this was the programs' first since 2016-17.

The Cowboys participated in 3 exhibition games, winning all 3. While in Athens, the team faced Panerythraikos B.C. on July 27 and Panathinaikos Select on July 28. They then traveled to Patras and faced off against Promitheas Patras B.C. on July 30.

In addition, the team participated in a variety of sightseeing and team-building exercises.

== Schedule and results ==
Date time, TV	Rank^{#}	Opponent^{#}	Result	Record	High points	High rebounds	High assists	Site (attendance) city, state
Non-conference regular season
Nov. 7, 2022; 7:00 p.m., MW Network		Colorado Christian	W 102–69	1–0	17 – Oden	6 – Tied	8 – Anderson	Arena-Auditorium (4,464); Laramie, WY
Nov. 10, 2022; 8:00 p.m., MW Network		Nicholls	W 79–68	2–0	20 – Wenzel	8 – Tied	6 – Maldonado	Arena-Auditorium (4,498); Laramie, WY
Nov. 13, 2022; 2:00 p.m., MW Network/ATTSN		Southeastern Louisiana	L 72–76	2–1	16 – Wenzel	11 – Maldonado	4 – Tied	Arena-Auditorium (4,782); Laramie, WY
Nov. 18, 2022; 1:15 p.m., ESPN3		vs. Howard; Paradise Jam Quarterfinals	W 78–71	3–1	28 – Maldonado	4 – Tied	3 – Anderson	Sports and Fitness Center (1,524); Saint Thomas, U.S. Virgin Islands
Nov. 20, 2022; 3:45 p.m., ESPN3		vs. Drake; Paradise Jam Semifinals	L 56–61	3–2	20 – Maldonado	6 – Thompson	3 – Anderson	Sports and Fitness Center; Saint Thomas, U.S. Virgin Islands
Nov. 21, 2022; 3:45 p.m., ESPN3		vs. Boston College; Paradise Jam – 3rd-Place	L 48–59	3–3	11 – Anderson	5 – Tied	2 – Tied	Sports and Fitness Center; Saint Thomas, U.S. Virgin Islands
Nov. 30, 2022; 2:00 p.m., Cowboy Sports Network		vs. Santa Clara; Sport Tours Showdown	L 85–89 ^{OT}	3–4	25 – Reynolds	6 – Agbonkpolo	7 – Anderson	Bruin Arena; Taylorsville, UT
Dec. 3, 2022; 2:00 p.m., MW Network/ATTSN		Grand Canyon	L 58–66	3–5	16 – Kyman	8 – Thompson	4 – Maldonado	Arena-Auditorium (4,472); Laramie, WY
Dec. 6, 2022; 7:00 p.m., MW Network		Texas A&M-Commerce	W 91–76	4–5	30 – Reynolds	12 – Wenzel	3 – Maldonado	Arena-Auditorium (3,953); Laramie, WY
Dec. 10, 2022; 7:00 p.m., MW Network		Louisiana Tech	W 92–65	5–5	20 – Tied	5 – Tied	7 – Maldonado	Arena-Auditorium (4,604); Laramie, WY
Dec. 17, 2022; 6:00 p.m., CBSSN		vs. Dayton; Legends of Basketball Showcase	L 49–66	5–6	20 – Reynolds	5 – Foster	5 – Maldonado	United Center; Chicago, IL
Dec. 21, 2022; 6:30 p.m., ESPN+		vs. Saint Mary's; Jerry Colangelo Classic	L 54–66	5–7	21 – Reynolds	8 – Anderson	1 – Tied	Footprint Center; Phoenix, AZ
Mountain West regular season
Dec. 28, 2022; 9:00 p.m., CBSSN		at Fresno State	L 53–58	5–8 (0–1)	16 – Reynolds	9 – Anderson	3 – Maldonado	Save Mart Center (4,165); Fresno, CA
Dec. 31, 2022; 2:00 p.m., FS1		No. 22 New Mexico	L 75–76	5–9 (0–2)	17 – Anderson	10 – Maldonado	5 – Anderson	Arena-Auditorium (4,823); Laramie, WY
Jan. 7, 2023; 2:00 p.m., CBS		San Diego State	L 75–80	5–10 (0–3)	20 – Maldonado	7 – Oden	3 – Tied	Arena-Auditorium (4,346); Laramie, WY
Jan. 10, 2023; 8:30 p.m., FS1		at Utah State	L 63–83	5–11 (0–4)	20 – Maldonado	8 – Oden	5 – Anderson	Smith Spectrum (7,890); Logan, UT
Jan. 14, 2023; 9:00 p.m., FS1		Boise State	L 68–85	5–12 (0–5)	13 – Reynolds	6 – Anderson	4 – Maldonado	Arena-Auditorium (4,178); Laramie, WY
Jan. 17, 2023; 7:00 p.m., MW Network/Altitude2		at Air Force	L 74–82	5–13 (0–6)	26 – Reynolds	6 – Barnhart	6 – Reynolds	Clune Arena (1,257); Colorado Springs, CO
Jan. 21, 2023; 2:00 p.m., FS1		Colorado State; Border War	W 58–57	6–13 (1–6)	17 – Reynolds	8 – Thompson	5 – Maldonado	Arena-Auditorium (6,968); Laramie, WY
Jan. 24, 2023; 9:00 p.m., CBSSN		at UNLV	L 72–86	6–14 (1–7)	23 – Reynolds	8 – Thompson	4 – Maldonado	Thomas & Mack Center (4,539); Paradise, NV
Jan. 31, 2023; 8:00 p.m., FS1		Fresno State	W 85–62	7–14 (2–7)	18 – Thompson	10 – Oden	8 – Maldonado	Arena-Auditorium (3,950); Laramie, WY
Feb. 4, 2023; 8:00 p.m., CBSSN		at San José State	L 64–84	7–15 (2–8)	34 – Maldonado	4 – Tied	3 – Maldonado	Provident Credit Union Event Center (2,609); San Jose, CA
Feb. 8, 2023; 8:30 p.m., FS1		UNLV	L 59–69	7–16 (2–9)	17 – Maldonado	9 – Barnhart	3 – Maldonado	Arena-Auditorium (3,717); Laramie, WY
Feb. 11, 2023; 6:00 p.m., CBSSN		at Boise State	L 63–79	7–17 (2–10)	14 – Tied	5 – Powell	3 – Maldonado	ExtraMile Arena (11,037); Boise, ID
Feb. 14, 2023; 8:00 p.m., CBSSN		New Mexico	W 70–56	8–17 (3–10)	20 – Maldonado	10 – Maldonado	10 – Maldonado	The Pit (11,185); Albuquerque, NM
Feb. 17, 2023; 8:00 p.m., FS1		Air Force	L 69–75	8–18 (3–11)	22 – Maldonado	7 – Thompson	7 – Maldonado	Arena-Auditorium (4,719); Laramie, WY
Feb. 21, 2023; 7:00 p.m., CBSSN		Utah State	L 55–65	8–19 (3–12)	21 – DuSell	9 – Maldonado	5 – Maldonado	Arena-Auditorium (3,894); Laramie, WY
Feb. 24, 2023; 7:00 p.m., FS1		at Colorado State; Border War	L 71–84	8–20 (3–13)	23 – Maldonado	6 – Maldonado	6 – Wenzel	Moby Arena (8,083); Fort Collins, CO
Feb. 27, 2023; 7:00 p.m., CBSSN		Nevada	W 80–71	9–20 (4–13)	28 – Oden	13 – Thompson	Maldonado – 11	Arena-Auditorium (4,520); Laramie, WY
Mar. 4, 2023; 8:00 p.m., CBSSN		at No. 18 San Diego State	L 50–67	9–21 (4–14)	17 – Oden	5 – Tied	3 – Foster	Viejas Arena (12,414); San Diego, CA
Mountain West tournament
March 8, 2023; 4:00 pm, Stadium	(11)	vs. (6) New Mexico; First round	L 76–87	9–22	36 – Maldonado	9 – Thompson	3 – Maldonado	Thomas & Mack Center (-); Paradise, NV
*Non-conference game. ^{#}Rankings from AP Poll. (#) Tournament seedings in parentheses. All times are in Mountain Time.
