= 2022–23 Colorado State Rams men's basketball team =

American college basketball season

2022–23 Colorado State Rams men's basketball
- Conference: Mountain West Conference
- Record: 15–18 (6–12 MW)
- Head coach: Niko Medved (5th season)
- Assistant coaches: Ali Farokhmanesh; Brian Cooley; Sam Jones
- Home arena: Moby Arena

2022–23 Mountain West Conference men's basketball standings
	Conf.				Overall
Team	W		L	PCT	W		L	PCT
No. 18 San Diego State †	15	–	3	.833	32	–	7	.821
Boise State	13	–	5	.722	24	–	10	.706
Utah State	13	–	5	.722	26	–	9	.743
Nevada	12	–	6	.667	22	–	11	.667
San Jose State	10	–	8	.556	21	–	14	.600
New Mexico	8	–	10	.444	22	–	12	.647
UNLV	7	–	11	.389	19	–	13	.594
Colorado State	6	–	12	.333	15	–	18	.455
Fresno State	6	–	12	.333	11	–	20	.355
Air Force	5	–	13	.278	14	–	18	.438
Wyoming	4	–	14	.222	9	–	22	.290
† Conference tournament winner Rankings from AP poll

The 2022–23 Colorado State Rams men's basketball team represented Colorado State University during the 2022–23 NCAA Division I men's basketball season. The Rams were led by 5th-year head coach Niko Medved and played their home games for the 57th season at Moby Arena in Fort Collins, Colorado. They participate as members of the Mountain West Conference for the 24th season.

== Previous season ==
The Rams finished the 2021–22 season 25–6, 14–4 in Mountain West play to finish in 2nd place.

In the Mountain West tournament, the Rams received a first-round bye. They faced and defeated Utah State 53–51 in the quarterfinals before being eliminated by 3-seed San Diego State in a 63–58 loss.

The Rams were selected to the NCAA tournament for the first time since 2013 as the 6-seed in the South region. They were defeated by 11-seed Michigan in the first round 75–63 to end their season. For the first time in program history, the team finished the season ranked in the AP Poll, at #24.

== Offseason ==
=== Departures ===
Name	Number	Pos.	Height	Weight	Year	Hometown	Reason for departure
Jalen Scott	2	G	6'2"	180	Freshman	Surprise, AZ	Entered transfer portal
Kendle Moore	3	G	6'0"	155	Senior	Danville, IL	Elected to transfer to Missouri State
Dischon Thomas	11	F	6'8"	235	Junior	Durham, NC	Elected to transfer to Montana
Chandler Jacobs	13	G	6'3"	185	Graduate Student	Missouri City, TX	Completed college eligibility
David Roddy	21	F	6'6"	255	RS Junior	San Marcos, CA	Declared for 2022 NBA draft
Adam Thistlewood	31	F	6'8"	225	Senior	Golden, CO	Elected to transfer to Colorado School of Mines

=== Incoming transfers ===
Name	Number	Pos.	Height	Weight	Year	Hometown	Previous School
Josiah Strong	3	G	6'4"	195	Graduate Student	Brooklyn Park, MN	Transferred from Illinois State. Will be eligible to play immediately since Strong graduated from Illinois State.
Patrick Cartier	12	F	6'8''	220	Graduate Student	Brookfield, WI	Transferred from Hillsdale. Will be eligible to play immediately since Cartier graduated from Hillsdale.
Joe Palmer	24	G	6'4''	190	Senior	Faribault, MN	Transferred from Augsburg. Palmer will be eligible to play immediately under the one-time transfer rule.

=== 2022 recruiting class ===
College recruiting information
Name	Hometown	School	Height	Weight	Commit date
Taviontae Jackson; PG/SG	Las Vegas, NV	Las Vegas HS	6 ft 2 in (1.88 m)	165 lb (75 kg)	Apr 18, 2022
Taviontae Jackson; PG/SG	Recruit ratings: Scout: Rivals: 247Sports: ESPN: (N/A)				
Jack Payne; SG/SF	Boise, ID	Owyhee HS	6 ft 6 in (1.98 m)	195 lb (88 kg)	Oct 3, 2021
Jack Payne; SG/SF	Recruit ratings: Scout: Rivals: 247Sports: ESPN: (N/A)				
Kyle Evans; PF/C	Aliso Viejo, CA	Santa Margarita Catholic HS	6 ft 10 in (2.08 m)	200 lb (91 kg)	Aug 16, 2021
Kyle Evans; PF/C	Recruit ratings: Scout: Rivals: 247Sports: ESPN: (N/A)				
Overall recruit ranking:
Note: In many cases, Scout, Rivals, 247Sports, On3, and ESPN may conflict in their listings of height and weight.; In these cases, the average was taken. ESPN grades are on a 100-point scale.; Sources:

== Roster ==
2022–23 Colorado State Rams men's basketball team
Players
Coaches

Pos.	#	Name	Height	Weight	Year	Previous school	Hometown
G	0	Trace Young (W)	6 ft 3 in (1.91 m)	180 lb (82 kg)	Jr	Dripping Springs HS	Austin, TX
G	1	John Tonje	6 ft 5 in (1.96 m)	210 lb (95 kg)	Sr	Omaha Central HS	Omaha, NE
G	2	Taviontae Jackson	6 ft 2 in (1.88 m)	165 lb (75 kg)	Fr	Las Vegas HS	Las Vegas, NV
G	3	Josiah Strong	6 ft 4 in (1.93 m)	195 lb (88 kg)	GS	Illinois State	Brooklyn Park, MN
G	4	Isaiah Stevens	6 ft 0 in (1.83 m)	185 lb (84 kg)	Sr	Allen HS	Allen, TX
G	5	Baylor Hebb	6 ft 2 in (1.88 m)	180 lb (82 kg)	Jr	Loyola–Chicago	Colleyville, TX
F/C	10	James Moors	6 ft 10 in (2.08 m)	260 lb (118 kg)	RS Jr	Westlake Boys HS	Auckland, New Zealand
F	11	Jack Payne	6 ft 6 in (1.98 m)	195 lb (88 kg)	Fr	Owyhee HS	Boise, ID
F	12	Patrick Cartier	6 ft 8 in (2.03 m)	220 lb (100 kg)	GS	Hillsdale College	Brookfield, WI
G	15	Jalen Lake	6 ft 4 in (1.93 m)	190 lb (86 kg)	So	Waxahachie HS	Waxachachie, TX
F	22	Nick Bassett (W)	6 ft 5 in (1.96 m)	205 lb (93 kg)	Sr	Nebraska Wesleyan	Colorado Springs, CO
G	23	Isaiah Rivera	6 ft 5 in (1.96 m)	210 lb (95 kg)	Jr	Geneseo HS	Geneseo, IL
F	24	Joe Palmer	6 ft 4 in (1.93 m)	190 lb (86 kg)	Sr	Augsburg	Faribault, MN
F	32	Kyle Evans	6 ft 10 in (2.08 m)	200 lb (91 kg)	Fr	Santa Margarita Catholic HS	Aliso Viejo, CA
C	35	Jacob Jennissen	7 ft 1 in (2.16 m)	240 lb (109 kg)	Jr	Sauk Centre Secondary	Sauk Centre, MN

Head coach

- Niko Medved (Minnesota)

Assistant coach(es)

- Ali Farokhmanesh (Northern Iowa)
- Brian Cooley (Nebraska Wesleyan)
- Sam Jones (Northwood)

Legend

- (C) Team captain
- (S) Suspended
- (I) Ineligible
- (W) Walk-on
- Injured
- Current redshirt

Roster

== Schedule and results ==
Date time, TV	Rank^{#}	Opponent^{#}	Result	Record	High points	High rebounds	High assists	Site (attendance) city, state
Exhibition
Oct. 28, 2022; 7:00 p.m.		Metro State	W 91–52		19 – Tonje	10 – Moors	4 – Tied	Moby Arena; Fort Collins, CO
Non-conference regular season
Nov. 7, 2022; 7:00 p.m., Evoca		Gardner–Webb	W 65–63	1–0	16 – Tonje	7 – Rivera	3 – Tied	Moby Arena (4,435); Fort Collins, CO
Nov. 11, 2022; 7:30 p.m., Evoca		Southeastern Louisiana	W 80–69	2–0	17 – Cartier	7 – Tied	6 – Lake	Moby Arena (5,028); Fort Collins, CO
Nov. 14, 2022; 7:00 p.m., Evoca		Weber State	W 77–52	3–0	15 – Tonje	7 – Moors	6 – Hebb	Moby Arena (3,769); Fort Collins, CO
Nov. 17, 2022; 3:00 p.m., ESPNU		vs. South Carolina; Charleston Classic Quarterfinals	W 85–53	4–0	24 – Moors	9 – Moors	5 – Hebb	TD Arena; Charleston, SC
Nov. 18, 2022; 3:00 p.m., ESPN2		at College of Charleston; Charleston Classic Semifinals	L 64–74	4–1	15 – Rivera	7 – Tonje	5 – Jackson	TD Arena; Charleston, SC
Nov. 20, 2022; 4:00 p.m., ESPNU		vs. Penn State; Charleston Classic – 3rd Place	L 56–68	4–2	15 – Rivera	13 – Tonje	5 – Rivera	TD Arena (5,405); Charleston, SC
Nov. 26, 2022; 2:00 p.m., Evoca		Mississippi Valley State	W 88–45	5–2	25 – Tonje	7 – Tonje	4 – Jackson	Moby Arena (3,884); Fort Collins, CO
Nov. 30, 2022; 7:00 p.m., Evoca		Loyola Marymount	W 87–71	6–2	23 – Tonje	7 – Tonje	5 – Jackson	Moby Arena (4,342); Fort Collins, CO
Dec. 3, 2022; 2:00 p.m., Evoca		Northern Colorado	L 83–88	6–3	23 – Cartier	4 – Tied	5 – Jackson	Moby Arena (5,439); Fort Collins, CO
Dec. 8, 2022; 7:00 p.m., ESPN2		at Colorado	L 65–93	6–4	15 – Stevens	4 – Tied	3 – Stevens	CU Events Center (10,033); Boulder, CO
Dec. 11, 2022; 7:00 p.m., Evoca		Peru State	W 115–72	7–4	24 – Stevens	6 – Moors	10 – Stevens	Moby Arena (3,563); Fort Collins, CO
Dec. 18, 2022; 6:00 p.m.		at Saint Mary's	W 62–60	8–4	23 – Stevens	4 – Tied	5 – Stevens	University Credit Union Pavilion (3,188); Moraga, CA
Dec. 21, 2022; 9:00 p.m., P12N		vs. USC; Jerry Colangelo Classic	L 64–73	8–5	22 – Cartier	5 – Rivera	9 – Stevens	Footprint Center (2,870); Phoenix, AZ
Mountain West regular season
Dec. 28, 2022; 7:00 p.m., CBSSN		at No. 22 New Mexico	L 69–88	8–6 (0–1)	16 – Tied	6 – Rivera	7 – Stevens	The Pit (15,215); Albuquerque, NM
Dec. 31, 2022; 2:00 p.m., Evoca		San José State	L 70–78	8–7 (0–2)	24 – Stevens	5 – Evans	10 – Stevens	Moby Arena (4,268); Fort Collins, CO
Jan. 4, 2023; 8:30 p.m., FS1		at Nevada	L 69–80	8–8 (0–3)	18 – Cartier	5 – Tied	4 – Tied	Lawlor Events Center (6,102); Reno, NV
Jan. 7, 2023; 2:30 p.m., Evoca		Fresno State	W 79–57	9–8 (1–3)	16 – Tied	6 – Tonje	6 – Tied	Moby Arena (4,196); Fort Collins, CO
Jan. 10, 2023; 7:00 p.m., Evoca		Air Force	L 74–85 ^{OT}	9–9 (1–4)	23 – Cartier	5 – Rivera	7 – Lake	Moby Arena (4,003); Fort Collins, CO
Jan. 14, 2023; 5:00 p.m., CBSSN		at UNLV	W 82–81 ^{OT}	10–9 (2–4)	33 – Stevens	9 – Moors	9 – Stevens	Thomas & Mack Center (5,802); Paradise, NV
Jan. 18, 2023; 8:30 p.m., FS1		San Diego State	L 76–82 ^{OT}	10–10 (2–5)	17 – Lake	8 – Moors	11 – Stevens	Moby Arena (6,008); Fort Collins, CO
Jan. 21, 2023; 2:00 p.m., FS1		at Wyoming; Border War	L 57–58	10–11 (2–6)	15 – Stevens	10 – Stevens	7 – Stevens	Arena-Auditorium (6,968); Laramie, WY
Jan. 28, 2023; 6:00 p.m., CBSSN		at Boise State	L 59–80	10–12 (2–7)	19 – Stevens	6 – Cartier	5 – Stevens	ExtraMile Arena (12,021); Boise, ID
Jan. 31, 2023; 7:00 p.m.		UNLV	L 71–83	10–13 (2–8)	18 – Stevens	8 – Cartier	7 – Stevens	Moby Arena (4,657); Fort Collins, CO
Feb. 4, 2023; 6:00 p.m., CBSSN		Utah State	L 79–88	10–14 (2–9)	25 – Stevens	7 – Moors	8 – Stevens	Moby Arena (6,018); Fort Collins, CO
Feb. 7, 2023; 7:00 p.m.		at Air Force	W 69–53	11–14 (3–9)	21 – Tonje	7 – Moors	4 – Stevens	Clune Arena (1,068); Colorado Springs, CO
Feb. 15, 2023; 8:00 p.m., FS1		Boise State	L 78–80	11–15 (3–10)	18 – Cartier	4 – Tied	12 – Stevens	Moby Arena (3,521); Fort Collins, CO
Feb. 18, 2023; 3:00 p.m.		at Fresno State	W 60–57	12–15 (4–10)	17 – Stevens	8 – Jackson	4 – Stevens	Save Mart Center (7,137); Fresno, CA
Feb. 21, 2023; 9:00 p.m., CBSSN		at No. 22 San Diego State	L 58–77	12–16 (4–11)	18 – Tonje	7 – Jackson	2 – Stevens	Viejas Arena (12,414); San Diego, CA
Feb. 24, 2023; 7:00 p.m., FS1		Wyoming; Border War	W 84–71	13–16 (5–11)	25 – Tonje	6 – Tonje	12 – Stevens	Moby Arena (8,083); Fort Collins, CO
Feb. 28, 2023; 9:00 p.m., CBSSN		at San José State	L 46–63	13–17 (5–12)	17 – Cartier	6 – Tied	3 – Stevens	Provident Credit Union Event Center (2,347); San Jose, CA
Mar. 3, 2023; 9:00 p.m., FS1		New Mexico	W 92–84	14–17 (6–12)	24 – Tonje	7 – Jackson	13 – Stevens	Moby Arena (4,936); Fort Collins, CO
Mountain West tournament
March 8, 2023; 11:00 am, Stadium	(8)	vs. (9) Fresno State; First round	W 67–65	15–17	20 – Tonje	6 – Rivera	4 – Stevens	Thomas & Mack Center; Paradise, NV
March 9, 2023; 12:00 pm, CBSSN	(8)	vs. (1) No. 20 San Diego State; Quarterfinals	L 61–64	15–18	17 – Tonje	8 – Rivera	8 – Stevens	Thomas & Mack Center; Paradise, NV
*Non-conference game. ^{#}Rankings from AP Poll. (#) Tournament seedings in parentheses. All times are in Mountain Time.
