= 2022–23 Sacramento State Hornets men's basketball team =

American college basketball season

2022–23 Sacramento State Hornets men's basketball
- Conference: Big Sky Conference
- Record: 14–18 (7–11 Big Sky)
- Head coach: David Patrick (1st season)
- Associate head coach: Michael Czepil
- Assistant coaches: Hays Myers; Loren Leath
- Home arena: Hornets Nest (Capacity: 1,012)

2022–23 Big Sky men's basketball standings
	Conf.				Overall
Team	W		L	PCT	W		L	PCT
Eastern Washington	16	–	2	.889	23	–	11	.676
Montana State †	15	–	3	.833	25	–	10	.714
Weber State	12	–	6	.667	18	–	15	.545
Montana	10	–	7	.588	17	–	14	.548
Idaho State	8	–	10	.444	11	–	21	.344
Sacramento State	7	–	11	.389	14	–	18	.438
Portland State	6	–	11	.353	12	–	19	.387
Northern Colorado	6	–	12	.333	12	–	20	.375
Northern Arizona	5	–	13	.278	12	–	23	.343
Idaho	4	–	14	.222	10	–	22	.313
† Conference tournament winner

The 2022–23 Sacramento State Hornets men's basketball team represented California State University, Sacramento in the 2022–23 NCAA Division I men's basketball season. The Hornets, led by first-year head coach David Patrick, played their home games at the Hornets Nest in Sacramento, California as members of the Big Sky Conference.

The Hornets finished the season 14–18, 7–11 in Big Sky play, to finish in sixth place. In the Big Sky tournament, the Hornets lost their quarterfinals game against Weber State to end their season.

== Previous season ==
The Hornets finished the 2021–22 season 11–18, 6–14 in Big Sky play, to finish in a tie for eighth place. In the Big Sky tournament, they defeated Idaho in the first round before falling to Montana State in the quarterfinals.

On April 5, interim head coach Brandon Laird found out that he would not be retained as head coach, following the school's announcement that Oklahoma associate head coach David Patrick would be the team's next head coach.

== Roster ==
2022–23 Sacramento State Hornets men's basketball team
Players
Coaches

Pos.	#	Name	Height	Weight	Year	Previous school	Hometown
F	0	Hunter Marks	6 ft 9 in (2.06 m)	210 lb (95 kg)	Sr	Hartford	Phillip Island, Australia
G	1	Teiano Hardee	6 ft 5 in (1.96 m)	215 lb (98 kg)	So	Vanden High School	Fairfield, CA
G	3	Rick III Barros	6 ft 5 in (1.96 m)	200 lb (91 kg)	RS So	Nation Wide Academy	Sacramento, CA
G	4	Zach Chappell	6 ft 3 in (1.91 m)	195 lb (88 kg)	Sr	San Jose State	Sacramento, CA
G	5	Gianni Hunt	6 ft 4 in (1.93 m)	190 lb (86 kg)	Jr	Oregon State	Lakewood, CA
G	11	Quadry Adams	6 ft 4 in (1.93 m)	190 lb (86 kg)	So	St. Bonaventure	Piscataway, NJ
G	13	Xavier Ford	6 ft 4 in (1.93 m)	205 lb (93 kg)	Jr	Riverside City College	Pasadena, CA
F	14	Kiir Kiir Chol Deng	6 ft 9 in (2.06 m)	200 lb (91 kg)	Fr	NBA Global Academy	Juba, South Sudan
G	20	Austin Patterson	6 ft 3 in (1.91 m)	185 lb (84 kg)	So	Wofford	Sonora, CA
G	22	Cameron Wilbon	6 ft 5 in (1.96 m)	200 lb (91 kg)	Jr	Robert Morris	Gary, IN
G	24	Chris Holley	6 ft 2 in (1.88 m)	175 lb (79 kg)	So	Jesuit High School	Sacramento, CA
C	25	Callum McRae	7 ft 1 in (2.16 m)	280 lb (127 kg)	Sr	UC Riverside	Palmerston North, New Zealand
F	55	Akol Mawein	6 ft 9 in (2.06 m)	220 lb (100 kg)	Jr	Oklahoma	Sydney, Australia

Head coach

- David Patrick (Louisiana)

Assistant coach(es)

- Michael Czepil (Nicholls State)
- Hays Myers (LSU)
- Loren Leath (Sacramento State)

Legend

- (C) Team captain
- (S) Suspended
- (I) Ineligible
- (W) Walk-on
- Injured
- Current redshirt

Roster
Last update: November 19, 2022

== Schedule and results ==
Date time, TV	Rank^{#}	Opponent^{#}	Result	Record	Site (attendance) city, state
Non-conference regular season
November 7, 2022*; 8:30 p.m., P12N		at No. 8 UCLA	L 50–76	0–1	Pauley Pavilion (6,096); Los Angeles, CA
November 12, 2022*; 7:00 p.m., ESPN+		at UC San Diego	W 65–55	1–1	LionTree Arena (2,259); La Jolla, CA
November 14, 2022*; 6:00 p.m., Altitude		at Denver	W 73–69	2–1	Hamilton Gymnasium (1,113); Denver, CO
November 18, 2022*; 12:00 p.m., ESPN+		UC Merced	W 58–43	3–1	Hornets Nest (711); Sacramento, CA
November 22, 2022*; 7:30 p.m.		vs. UC Davis; Causeway Cup	L 71–82	3–2	Golden 1 Center (1,480); Sacramento, CA
November 25, 2022*; 5:30 p.m., ESPN+		vs. Hawaii; North Shore Classic	L 61–74	3–3	Cannon Activities Center (1,225); Laie, HI
November 26, 2022*; 6:30 p.m., ESPN+		vs. Southern Utah; North Shore Classic	L 87–91 ^{2OT}	3–4	Cannon Activities Center (1,344); Laie, HI
December 3, 2022*; 2:00 p.m., WCC Network		at Santa Clara	L 65–72	3–5	Leavey Center (1,106); Santa Clara, CA
December 7, 2022*; 7:00 p.m., ESPN+		Denver	W 87–85 ^{OT}	4–5	Hornets Nest (690); Sacramento, CA
December 10, 2022*; 3:30 p.m., ESPN+		Long Beach State	W 76–74	5–5	Hornets Nest (710); Sacramento, CA
December 17, 2022*; 4:00 p.m., MW Network		at Fresno State	W 59–53	6–5	Save Mart Center (3,913); Fresno, CA
December 21, 2022*; 6:00 p.m., ESPN+		at Cal State Fullerton	L 49–59	6–6	Titan Gym (538); Fullerton, CA
December 28, 2022*; 6:00 p.m., ESPN+		Stanislaus State	W 72–51	7–6	Hornets Nest (657); Sacramento, CA
Big Sky regular season
December 31, 2022; 2:00 p.m., ESPN+		Portland State	W 74–63	8–6 (1–0)	Hornets Nest (577); Sacramento, CA
January 5, 2023; 6:00 p.m., ESPN+		at Idaho	W 85–83 ^{OT}	9–6 (2–0)	ICCU Arena (1,369); Moscow, ID
January 7, 2023; 2:00 p.m., ESPN+		at Eastern Washington	L 75–78	9–7 (2–1)	Reese Court; Cheney, WA
January 12, 2023; 7:00 p.m., ESPN+		Northern Colorado	W 72–64	10–7 (3–1)	Hornets Nest (613); Sacramento, CA
January 14, 2023; 2:00 p.m., ESPN+		Northern Arizona	W 59–56	11–7 (4–1)	Hornets Nest (475); Sacramento, CA
January 19, 2023; 6:00 p.m., ESPN+		at Idaho State	L 61–65	11–8 (4–2)	Reed Gym (1,096); Pocatello, ID
January 21, 2023; 6:00 p.m., ESPN+		at Weber State	L 48–50	11–9 (4–3)	Dee Events Center (6,156); Ogden, UT
January 26, 2023; 7:00 p.m., ESPN+		Montana	W 67–48	12–9 (5–3)	Hornets Nest (714); Sacramento, CA
January 28, 2023; 7:00 p.m., ESPN+		Montana State	L 65–72	12–10 (5–4)	Hornets Nest (875); Sacramento, CA
February 2, 2023; 7:00 p.m., ESPN+		Eastern Washington	L 63–82	12–11 (5–5)	Hornets Nest (1,096); Sacramento, CA
February 4, 2023; 2:00 p.m., ESPN+		Idaho	L 76–82 ^{OT}	12–12 (5–6)	Hornets Nest (747); Sacramento, CA
February 9, 2023; 5:00 p.m., ESPN+		at Northern Arizona	L 55–77	12–13 (5–7)	Findlay Toyota Court (847); Flagstaff, AZ
February 11, 2023; 5:00 p.m., ESPN+		at Northern Colorado	L 54–70	12–14 (5–8)	Bank of Colorado Arena (1,265); Greeley, CO
February 16, 2023; 7:00 p.m., ESPN+		Weber State	L 49–52	12–15 (5–9)	Hornets Nest (906); Sacramento, CA
February 18, 2023; 4:00 p.m., ESPN+		Idaho State	W 70–65	13–15 (6–9)	Hornets Nest (975); Sacramento, CA
February 23, 2023; 6:00 p.m., ESPN+		at Montana State	L 56–60	13–16 (6–10)	Worthington Arena (2,411); Bozeman, MT
February 25, 2023; 6:00 p.m., ESPN+		at Montana	L 72–74	13–17 (6–11)	Dahlberg Arena (3,831); Missoula, MT
February 27, 2023; 7:00 p.m., ESPN+		at Portland State	W 76–74	14–17 (7–11)	Viking Pavilion; Portland, OR
Big Sky tournament
March 6, 2023; 8:00 p.m., ESPN+	(6)	vs. (3) Weber State; Quarterfinals	L 64–70	14–18	Idaho Central Arena; Boise, ID
*Non-conference game. ^{#}Rankings from AP poll. (#) Tournament seedings in parentheses. All times are in Pacific.
