= 2022–23 Portland State Vikings men's basketball team =

American college basketball season

2022–23 Portland State Vikings men's basketball
- Conference: Big Sky Conference
- Record: 12–19 (6–11 Big Sky)
- Head coach: Jase Coburn (2nd season)
- Assistant coaches: Matt Dunn; Chris Foss; Quinton Upshur
- Home arena: Viking Pavilion

2022–23 Big Sky men's basketball standings
	Conf.				Overall
Team	W		L	PCT	W		L	PCT
Eastern Washington	16	–	2	.889	23	–	11	.676
Montana State †	15	–	3	.833	25	–	10	.714
Weber State	12	–	6	.667	18	–	15	.545
Montana	10	–	7	.588	17	–	14	.548
Idaho State	8	–	10	.444	11	–	21	.344
Sacramento State	7	–	11	.389	14	–	18	.438
Portland State	6	–	11	.353	12	–	19	.387
Northern Colorado	6	–	12	.333	12	–	20	.375
Northern Arizona	5	–	13	.278	12	–	23	.343
Idaho	4	–	14	.222	10	–	22	.313
† Conference tournament winner

The 2022–23 Portland State Vikings men's basketball team represented Portland State University in the 2022–23 NCAA Division I men's basketball season. The Vikings, led by second-year head coach Jase Coburn, played their home games at Viking Pavilion in Portland, Oregon as members of the Big Sky Conference.

== Previous season ==
The Vikings finished the 2021–22 season 14–17, 10–10 in Big Sky play to finish in seventh place. In the Big Sky tournament, they defeated Northern Arizona and Southern Utah before losing to Northern Colorado in the semifinals.

== Offseason ==
=== Departures ===
Name	Number	Pos.	Height	Weight	Year	Hometown	Reason for departure
Damion Squire	0	G	6'1"	180	Junior	Montreal, QC	Left the team for personal reasons
James Jean-Marie	1	F	6'8"	235	Senior	Montreal, QC	Graduated
Ian Burke	2	G	6'5"	190	Junior	Phoenix, AZ	Walk-on; left the team for personal reasons
Ezekiel Alley	3	G	6'1"	180	Senior	Tucson, AZ	Graduated
Paris Dawson	4	G	6'2"	170	Freshman	Carson, CA	Transferred to Seattle
Michael Carter	5	G	6'5"	175	Junior	Seattle, WA	Left the team for personal reasons
Alexis Angeles	14	G	6'2"	185	Junior	Tualatin, OR	Graduate transferred to Bushnell
Gio Nelson	15	G	6'5"	205	Junior	Riverside, CA	Walk-on; left the team for personal reasons
Marlon Ruffin	22	G	6'5"	195	Junior	Madison, WI	Graduate transferred to Cal Poly Humboldt
Khalid Thomas	23	F	6'10"	210	Senior	Salem, OR	Graduated
Kiimani Holt	30	G	6'4"	220	Freshman	Phoenix, AZ	Transferred

=== Incoming transfers ===
Name	Number	Pos.	Height	Weight	Year	Hometown	Previous School
Cameron Parker	1	G	6'2"	170	GS Senior	Beaverton, OR	Montana
Bobby Harvey	2	G	6'3	200	Senior	Chicago, IL	IUPUI
Kendall Munson	4	F	6'8"	220	Sophomore	Seattle, WA	Pepperdine
Isiah Kirby	5	G	6'4"	190	Junior	Fort Lauderdale, FL	Tallahassee CC
Emmanuel Taban	15	F	6'7"	171	Junior	Phoenix, AZ	Cal State Fullerton
Isaiah Johnson	22	F	6'6"	215	Sophomore	Torrance, CA	Oregon State
Jorell Saterfield	23	G/F	6'4"	191	Junior	Chicago, IL	UTEP
Hunter Woods	25	G/F	6'6"	197	Junior	Pasadena, CA	Elon
Keshaun Saunders	55	G	6'5"	190	RS Junior	Brampton, ON	Toledo

=== 2022 recruiting class ===
College recruiting information
Name	Hometown	School	Height	Weight	Commit date
Cole Farrell; SG	St. Louis, MO	TLAP Sports Academy	6 ft 5 in (1.96 m)	195 lb (88 kg)	Mar 14, 2022
Cole Farrell; SG	Recruit ratings: No ratings found				
Overall recruit ranking:
Note: In many cases, Scout, Rivals, 247Sports, On3, and ESPN may conflict in their listings of height and weight.; In these cases, the average was taken. ESPN grades are on a 100-point scale.; Sources: "2022 Team Ranking". Rivals.

=== 2023 recruiting class ===
College recruiting information (2023)
Name	Hometown	School	Height	Weight	Commit date
Kelcy Phipps; CG	Torrence, CA	Bishop Montgomery High School	6 ft 2 in (1.88 m)	180 lb (82 kg)	Oct 6, 2022
Kelcy Phipps; CG	Recruit ratings: No ratings found				
Overall recruit ranking:
Note: In many cases, Scout, Rivals, 247Sports, On3, and ESPN may conflict in their listings of height and weight.; In these cases, the average was taken. ESPN grades are on a 100-point scale.; Sources: "2023 Team Ranking". Rivals.

== Roster ==
2022–23 Portland State Vikings men's basketball team
Players
Coaches

Pos.	#	Name	Height	Weight	Year	Previous school	Hometown
G	0	Cole Farrell	6 ft 5 in (1.96 m)	205 lb (93 kg)	Fr	TLAP Sports Academy (FL)	St. Louis, MO
G	1	Cameron Parker	6 ft 2 in (1.88 m)	180 lb (82 kg)	Sr	Montana	Beaverton, OR
G	2	Bobby Harvey	6 ft 4 in (1.93 m)	205 lb (93 kg)	Sr	IUPUI	Chicago, IL
F	4	Kendall Munson	6 ft 8 in (2.03 m)	235 lb (107 kg)	So	Pepperdine	Seattle, WA
G	5	Isiah Kirby	6 ft 4 in (1.93 m)	205 lb (93 kg)	Jr	Tallahassee CC	Ft. Lauderdale, FL
F	10	Hayden Curtiss	6 ft 11 in (2.11 m)	220 lb (100 kg)	So	Portland	North Bend, WA
F	12	Trey Wood	6 ft 8 in (2.03 m)	210 lb (95 kg)	Jr	Anthem Prep	Anthem, AZ
F	15	Emmanuel Taban	6 ft 7 in (2.01 m)	180 lb (82 kg)	Jr	Cal State Fullerton	Phoenix, AZ
F	22	Isaiah Johnson	6 ft 6 in (1.98 m)	225 lb (102 kg)	So	Oregon State	Torrance, CA
G	23	Jorell Saterfield	6 ft 4 in (1.93 m)	190 lb (86 kg)	Jr	UTEP	Chicago, IL
G/F	25	Hunter Woods	6 ft 6 in (1.98 m)	200 lb (91 kg)	Jr	Elon	Pasadena, CA
F	32	Jacob Eyman	6 ft 10 in (2.08 m)	240 lb (109 kg)	Jr	Fullerton College	Los Alamitos, CA
G	33	Mikal Starks	6 ft 1 in (1.85 m)	200 lb (91 kg)	Sr	Georgia	Miami, FL
G	55	Keshaun Saunders	6 ft 5 in (1.96 m)	195 lb (88 kg)	Jr	Toledo	Brampton, ON

Head coach

- Jase Coburn (Arizona State)

Assistant coach(es)

- Matt Dunn (Fort Hays State)
- Chris Foss (Oregon)
- Quinton Upshur (Northern Arizona)

Legend

- (C) Team captain
- (S) Suspended
- (I) Ineligible
- (W) Walk-on
- Injured
- Current redshirt

Roster

== Schedule and results ==
Date time, TV	Rank^{#}	Opponent^{#}	Result	Record	High points	High rebounds	High assists	Site (attendance) city, state
Non-conference regular season
November 11, 2022*; 7:00 p.m., KRCW		at Portland	L 91–98	0–1	23 – Parker	14 – Woods	6 – Parker	Chiles Center (1,607); Portland, OR
November 13, 2022*; 3:00 p.m., ESPN+		at Seattle	L 71–83	0–2	19 – Saterfield	8 – Woods	3 – Parker	Redhawk Center (999); Seattle, WA
November 16, 2022*; 7:00 p.m., ESPN+		Evergreen State	W 113–40	1–2	16 – Kirby	10 – Saterfield	7 – Parker	Viking Pavilion (934); Portland, OR
November 19, 2022*; 7:00 p.m., P12N		at Oregon State	W 79–66	2–2	26 – Saterfield	5 – Tied	6 – Parker	Gill Coliseum (3,482); Corvallis, OR
November 24, 2022*; 9:30 p.m., ESPN		vs. No. 6 Gonzaga; Phil Knight Legacy Quarterfinals	L 78–102	2–3	21 – Saterfield	5 – Eyman	8 – Parker	Veterans Memorial Coliseum (4,512); Portland, OR
November 25, 2022*; 6:00 p.m., ESPNews		vs. West Virginia; Phil Knight Legacy consolation 2nd round	L 71–89	2–4	19 – Parker	5 – Woods	3 – Parker	Moda Center; Portland, OR
November 27, 2022*; 8:00 p.m., ESPNU		vs. Oregon State; Phil Knight Legacy 7th place game	W 83–71	3–4	15 – Saterfield	8 – Woods	6 – Parker	Chiles Center (1,016); Portland, OR
November 30, 2022*; 7:00 p.m., ESPN+		Portland Bible	W 114–31	4–4	18 – Harvey	11 – Eyman	11 – Saunders	Viking Pavilion (651); Portland, OR
December 3, 2022*; 1:00 p.m., KRCW/ESPN+		Air Force	W 68–64	5–4	24 – Tied	5 – Woods	6 – Parker	Viking Pavilion (1,055); Portland, OR
December 10, 2022*; 7:00 p.m., ESPN+		at Cal Poly	L 49–72	5–5	12 – Kirby	3 – Woods	2 – Tied	Mott Athletic Center (1,682); San Luis Obispo, CA
December 13, 2022*; 7:00 p.m., WCC Network		at Santa Clara	L 75–78	5–6	25 – Woods	7 – Saterfield	8 – Parker	Leavey Center (750); Santa Clara, CA
December 17, 2022*; 7:00 p.m., ESPN+		UC Santa Barbara	L 73–85	5–7	23 – Saterfield	7 – Parker	8 – Parker	Viking Pavilion (748); Portland, OR
December 22, 2022*; 7:00 p.m., ESPN+		at California Baptist	W 74–72	6–7	15 – Parker	6 – Tied	3 – Parker	CBU Events Center; Riverside, CA
Big Sky regular season
December 31, 2022; 2:00 p.m., ESPN+		at Sacramento State	L 63–74	6–8 (0–1)	11 – Johnson	4 – Tied	8 – Parker	Hornets Nest (577); Sacramento, CA
January 5, 2023; 6:00 p.m., ESPN+		at Eastern Washington	L 80–92	6–9 (0–2)	21 – Saterfield	8 – Saterfield	6 – Starks	Reese Court (587); Cheney, WA
January 7, 2023; 2:00 p.m., ESPN+		at Idaho	W 74–58	7–9 (1–2)	18 – Parker	6 – Parker	4 – Starks	ICCU Arena (1,528); Moscow, ID
January 12, 2023; 7:00 p.m., ESPN+		Northern Arizona	W 75–74	8–9 (2–2)	19 – Parker	6 – Parker	11 – Parker	Viking Pavilion (776); Portland, OR
January 14, 2023; 7:00 p.m., ESPN+		Northern Colorado	L 67–69	8–10 (2–3)	14 – Parker	7 – Woods	7 – Parker	Viking Pavilion (1,129); Portland, OR
January 19, 2023; 6:00 p.m., ESPN+		at Weber State	L 68–84	8–11 (2–4)	13 – Parker	5 – Tied	3 – Tied	Dee Events Center (4,448); Ogden, UT
January 21, 2023; 5:00 p.m., ESPN+		at Idaho State	W 72–65	9–11 (3–4)	17 – Parker	6 – Saterfield	6 – Parker	Reed Gym (1,644); Pocatello, ID
January 26, 2023; 7:00 p.m., ESPN+		Montana State	L 66–75	9–12 (3–5)	23 – Parker	8 – Woods	4 – Parker	Viking Pavilion (1,245); Portland, OR
January 28, 2023; 7:00 p.m., ESPN+		Montana	L 67–73	9–13 (3–6)	21 – Parker	5 – Saterfield	10 – Parker	Viking Pavilion (1,188); Portland, OR
February 2, 2023; 7:00 p.m., ESPN+		Idaho	W 69–66	10–13 (4–6)	22 – Parker	7 – Tied	6 – Parker	Viking Pavilion (1,089); Portland, OR
February 4, 2023; 7:00 p.m., ESPN+		Eastern Washington	L 88–98	10–14 (4–7)	29 – Parker	9 – Woods	10 – Parker	Viking Pavilion (1,187); Portland, OR
February 9, 2023; 5:00 p.m., ESPN+		at Northern Colorado	L 79–88	10–15 (4–8)	32 – Parker	9 – Saterfield	3 – Parker	Bank of Colorado Arena (1,542); Greeley, CO
February 11, 2023; 1:00 p.m., ESPN+		at Northern Arizona	W 88–87	11–15 (5–8)	21 – Parker	5 – Tied	7 – Parker	Findlay Toyota Court (1,211); Flagstaff, AZ
February 16, 2023; 6:00 p.m., ESPN+		Idaho State	W 79–70	12–15 (6–8)	18 – Parker	6 – Tied	12 – Parker	Viking Pavilion (1,263); Portland, OR
February 18, 2023; 7:00 p.m., ESPN+		Weber State	L 57–65	12–16 (6–9)	25 – Parker	6 – Johnson	6 – Parker	Viking Pavilion (1,583); Portland, OR
February 25, 2023; 3:00 p.m., ESPN+		at Montana State	L 78–91	12–17 (6–10)	26 – Parker	6 – Saterfield	4 – Parker	Brick Breeden Fieldhouse (4,093); Bozeman, MT
February 27, 2023; 7:00 p.m., ESPN+		Sacramento State	L 74–76	12–18 (6–11)	21 – Parker	5 – Saterfield	7 – Parker	Viking Pavilion; Portland, OR
Big Sky tournament
March 4, 2023; 8:00 p.m., ESPN+	(7)	vs. (8) Northern Colorado; First round	L 80–84	12–19	23 – Parker	8 – Woods	10 – Parker	Idaho Central Arena; Boise, ID
*Non-conference game. ^{#}Rankings from AP Poll. (#) Tournament seedings in parentheses. All times are in Pacific.
