= 2022–23 Santa Clara Broncos men's basketball team =

American college basketball season

2022–23 Santa Clara Broncos men's basketball

NIT, First Round
- Conference: West Coast Conference
- Record: 23–10 (11–5 WCC)
- Head coach: Herb Sendek (7th season)
- Assistant coaches: Jason Ludwig; Scott Garson; Ryan Madry
- Home arena: Leavey Center

2022–23 West Coast Conference men's basketball standings
	Conf.				Overall
Team	W		L	PCT	W		L	PCT
No. 19 Saint Mary's	14	–	2	.875	27	–	8	.771
No. 9 Gonzaga†	14	–	2	.875	31	–	6	.838
Santa Clara	11	–	5	.688	23	–	10	.697
Loyola Marymount	9	–	7	.563	19	–	12	.613
San Francisco	7	–	9	.438	20	–	14	.588
BYU	7	–	9	.438	19	–	15	.559
Pacific	7	–	9	.438	15	–	18	.455
Portland	5	–	11	.313	14	–	19	.424
San Diego	4	–	12	.250	11	–	20	.355
Pepperdine	2	–	14	.125	9	–	22	.290
† 2023 WCC tournament winner Rankings from AP poll

The 2022–23 Santa Clara Broncos men's basketball team represented Santa Clara University during the 2022–23 NCAA Division I men's basketball season. The Broncos were led by seventh-year head coach Herb Sendek and played their home games at the Leavey Center as members of the West Coast Conference (WCC).

== Previous season ==
The Broncos finished the 2021–22 season 21–12, 10–5 in WCC play, to finish in third place. They defeated Portland in the third round of the WCC tournament before losing in the semifinals to Saint Mary's. They received an invitation to the National Invitation Tournament, where they lost in the first round to Washington State.

== Offseason ==
=== Departures ===
Name	Number	Pos.	Height	Weight	Year	Hometown	Reason for departure
PJ Pipes	2	G	6'2"	190	Senior	Woodridge, IL	Graduated
Miguel Tomley	10	G	6'3"	185	RS Sophomore	Surrey, BC	Transferred to Idaho State
Josip Vrankic	13	F	6'9"	216	RS Senior	Toronto, ON	Graduated
Eli Barry	20	G	6'1"	165	Junior	Atlanta, GA	Walk-on; left the team for personal reasons
Max Dorward	22	G	6'5"	170	Senior	Palo Alto, CA	Walk-on; left the team for personal reasons
Jalen Williams	24	G	6'6"	190	Junior	Gilbert, AZ	Declared for 2022 NBA draft
Danilo Djuricic	30	F	6'8"	215	Senior	Brampton, ON	Graduated; signed to play professionally in Canada with Scarborough Shooting Stars
Max Besselink	33	F	6'7"	215	Freshman	Helsinki, Finland	Signed to professionally in Germany with s.Oliver Würzburg

=== Incoming transfers ===
Name	Number	Pos.	Height	Weight	Year	Hometown	Previous school
Carlos Marshall Jr.		G	6'6"		RS Senior	Memphis, TN	Tennessee State
Brandin Podziemski		G	6'5"	200	Sophomore	Muskego, WI	Illinois

=== Recruiting ===
College recruiting
Name	Hometown	School	Height	Weight	Commit date
Jake Ensminger; PG	Ulm, Germany	Orange Academy	6 ft 8 in (2.03 m)	200 lb (91 kg)	Jul 11, 2021
Jake Ensminger; PG	Recruit ratings: Scout: Rivals: 247Sports: (0)				
Kosy Akametu; SG	Los Angeles, CA	LA Premier Prep	6 ft 5 in (1.96 m)	210 lb (95 kg)	May 3, 2022
Kosy Akametu; SG	Recruit ratings: Scout: Rivals: 247Sports: (0)				
Christoph Tilly; C	Berlin, Germany	Alba Berlin	7 ft 0 in (2.13 m)	225 lb (102 kg)	May 9, 2022
Christoph Tilly; C	Recruit ratings: Scout: Rivals: 247Sports: (0)				
Overall recruit ranking: Scout: nr Rivals: nr ESPN: nr
Note: In many cases, Scout, Rivals, 247Sports, On3, and ESPN may conflict in their listings of height and weight.; In these cases, the average was taken. ESPN grades are on a 100-point scale.; Sources: "Santa Clara 2022 Basketball Commitments". Rivals.; "2022 Santa Clara Basketball Commits". Scout.; "ESPN". ESPN.; "Scout.com Team Recruiting Rankings". Scout.; "2022 Team Ranking". Rivals.

== Roster ==
2022–23 Santa Clara Broncos men's basketball team
Players
Coaches

Pos.	#	Name	Height	Weight	Year	Previous school	Hometown
G	0	Brenton Knapper	6 ft 0 in (1.83 m)	170 lb (77 kg)	RS Fr	Colony HS	Ontario, CA
G	1	Carlos Stewart	6 ft 1 in (1.85 m)	185 lb (84 kg)	So	The Dunham School	Baton Rouge, LA
G	2	Carlos Marshall Jr.	6 ft 6 in (1.98 m)	205 lb (93 kg)	RS Sr	Southwind HS; Tennessee State	Memphis, TN
G	3	Kosy Akametu	6 ft 5 in (1.96 m)	210 lb (95 kg)	Fr	King Drew HS	Carson, CA
G	4	Giordan Williams	6 ft 3 in (1.91 m)	191 lb (87 kg)	Sr	Long Beach Poly HS	Long Beach, CA
C	12	Jaden Bediako	6 ft 10 in (2.08 m)	245 lb (111 kg)	Sr	Ridley College	Brampton, ON
C	13	Christoph Tilly	7 ft 0 in (2.13 m)	225 lb (102 kg)	Fr	Alba Berlin	Berlin, Germany
F	14	Keshawn Justice	6 ft 7 in (2.01 m)	225 lb (102 kg)	RS Sr	Madison East HS	Madison, WI
F	15	Jacob Holt	6 ft 9 in (2.06 m)	235 lb (107 kg)	So	Vancouver College	Ladner, BC
F	21	Camaron Tongue	6 ft 7 in (2.01 m)	220 lb (100 kg)	So	Rivers School	Medfield, MA
G	22	Brandin Podziemski	6 ft 5 in (1.96 m)	205 lb (93 kg)	So	St John's Northwestern HS; Illinois	Muskego, WI
F	23	Parker Braun	6 ft 10 in (2.08 m)	215 lb (98 kg)	RS Sr	Blue Valley Northwest HS; Missouri	Overland Park, KS
G	31	Malachi Douyon (W)	6 ft 3 in (1.91 m)	180 lb (82 kg)	Fr	Pacific Collegiate Charter School	Santa Cruz, CA
G	44	Jacob Ensminger	6 ft 9 in (2.06 m)	205 lb (93 kg)	Fr	Ratiopharm Ulm	Ulm, Germany
G	50	Bradan Yarusso (W)	6 ft 1 in (1.85 m)	160 lb (73 kg)	Fr	St. Francis HS	Lombard, IL

Head coach

- Herb Sendek (Carnegie Mellon)

Assistant coach(es)

- Jason Ludwig (UCLA)
- Scott Garson (UC Santa Barbara)
- Ryan Madry (West Georgia)

Legend

- (C) Team captain
- (S) Suspended
- (I) Ineligible
- (W) Walk-on
- Injured
- Current redshirt

Roster
Last update: July 27, 2024

== Schedule and results ==
Date time, TV	Rank^{#}	Opponent^{#}	Result	Record	High points	High rebounds	High assists	Site (attendance) city, state
Non-conference regular season
November 7, 2022*; 7:00 p.m., WCC Network		Eastern Washington	W 84–72	1–0	30 – Podziemski	9 – tied	5 – Braun	Leavey Center (1,655); Santa Clara, CA
November 10, 2022*; 7:00 p.m., WCC Network		Georgia Southern	W 78–62	2–0	34 – Podziemski	11 – Podziemski	3 – tied	Leavey Center (1,152); Santa Clara, CA
November 14, 2022*; 6:00 p.m., MW Network		at Utah State	L 74–96	2–1	14 – Braun	6 – Tilly	5 – Braun	Smith Spectrum (6,549); Logan, UT
November 18, 2022*; 6:30 p.m., CBSSN		vs. DePaul; Bahamas Championship semifinals	W 69–61	3–1	21 – Podziemski	12 – Podziemski	4 – Justice	Baha Mar Convention Center (687); Nassau, Bahamas
November 20, 2022*; 4:00 p.m., CBSSN		vs. UCF; Bahamas Championship finals	L 50–57	3–2	12 – Justice	8 – Braun	3 – Justice	Baha Mar Convention Center (714); Nassau, BAH
November 23, 2022*; 4:00 p.m., WCC Network		Menlo College	W 64–51	4–2	17 – Justice	18 – Podziemski	5 – Justice	Leavey Center (766); Santa Clara, CA
November 26, 2022*; 9:00 p.m.		vs. Iona; Las Vegas Holiday Classic	W 86–76	5–2	27 – Podziemski	9 – Podziemski	5 – Braun	Orleans Arena; Paradise, NV
November 30, 2022*; 1:00 p.m., FloSports		vs. Wyoming; Sport Tours Showdown	W 89–85 ^{OT}	6–2	19 – tied	11 – Bediako	4 – tied	Lifetime Activities Center; Salt Lake City, UT
December 3, 2022*; 2:00 p.m., WCC Network		Sacramento State	W 72–65	7–2	27 – Podziemski	9 – Braun	5 – Justice	Leavey Center (1,106); Santa Clara, CA
December 7, 2022*; 7:00 p.m., WCC Network		New Mexico State	W 66–65	8–2	18 – Justice	9 – Braun	6 – Podziemski	Leavey Center (1,039); Santa Clara, CA
December 10, 2022*; 2:00 p.m., WCC Network		San Jose State	L 64–75	8–3	25 – Justice	6 – tied	5 – Podziemski	Leavey Center (1,225); Santa Clara, CA
December 13, 2022*; 7:00 p.m., WCC Network		Portland State	W 78–75	9–3	24 – Stewart	11 – Bediako	5 – Podziemski	Leavey Center (750); Santa Clara, CA
December 15, 2022*; 7:00 p.m., WCC Network		UC Irvine	W 86–74	10–3	29 – Stewart	6 – Justice	5 – Justice	Leavey Center (880); Santa Clara, CA
December 18, 2022*; 2:00 p.m., WCC Network		California	W 71–62	11–3	20 – Podziemski	7 – tied	6 – Podziemski	Leavey Center (1,290); Santa Clara, CA
December 22, 2022*; 2:00 p.m., WCC Network		Boise State	W 73–58	12–3	25 – Stewart	10 – Podziemski	5 – Justice	Leavey Center (1,061); Santa Clara, CA
WCC regular season
December 29, 2022; 7:00 p.m., WCC Network		San Francisco	W 79–67	13–3 (1–0)	18 – tied	9 – Braun	5 – tied	Leavey Center (1,302); Santa Clara, CA
December 31, 2022; 4:00 p.m., NBCSBA		Saint Mary's	L 64–67	13–4 (1–1)	19 – Podziemski	10 – Bediako	3 – tied	Leavey Center (1,379); Santa Clara, CA
January 5, 2023; 7:00 p.m., WCC Network		at Pepperdine	W 89–79	14–4 (2–1)	27 – Podziemski	10 – Podziemski	6 – Podziemski	Firestone Fieldhouse (682); Malibu, CA
January 7, 2023; 7:00 p.m., NBCSBA+		No. 9 Gonzaga	L 76–81	14–5 (2–2)	22 – Justice	11 – Braun	5 – Podziemski	Leavey Center (4,200); Santa Clara, CA
January 14, 2023; 6:00 p.m., NBCSC		at Pacific	W 92–81	15–5 (3–2)	26 – Justice	12 – Braun	3 – Stewart	Alex G. Spanos Center (1,380); Stockton, CA
January 19, 2023; 8:00 p.m., CBSSN		BYU	W 83–76	16–5 (4–2)	23 – Justice	8 – Podziemski	– Stewart	Leavey Center (2,455); Santa Clara, CA
January 21, 2023; 5:00 p.m., NBCSBA		at Saint Mary's	L 58–77	16–6 (4–3)	17 – Stewart	7 – Braun	2 – Bediako	University Credit Union Pavilion (3,500); Moraga, CA
January 28, 2023; 2:00 p.m., WCC Network		Pacific	L 89–95	16–7 (4–4)	38 – Podziemski	9 – Podziemski	4 – Stewart	Leavey Center (1,805); Santa Clara, CA
February 2, 2023; 8:00 p.m., CBSSN		at No. 12 Gonzaga	L 70–88	16–8 (4–5)	22 – Stewart	4 – tied	3 – Stewart	McCarthey Athletic Center (6,000); Spokane, WA
February 4, 2023; 7:00 p.m., ESPNU		at San Francisco	W 83–70	17–8 (5–5)	25 – Stewart	10 – Podziemski	4 – tied	War Memorial Gymnasium (3,650); San Francisco, CA
February 9, 2023; 7:00 p.m., WCC Network		San Diego	W 80–75	18–8 (6–5)	20 – Podziemski	9 – Podziemski	4 – Podziemski	Leavey Center (1,860); Santa Clara, CA
February 11, 2023; 4:00 p.m., NBCSC		Loyola Marymount	W 71–69	19–8 (7–5)	30 – Podziemski	5 – Podziemski	3 – Podziemski	Leavey Center (2,850); Santa Clara, CA
February 16, 2023; 6:00 p.m., CBSSN		at BYU	W 81–74	20–8 (8–5)	26 – Podziemski	12 – Podziemski	4 – Justice	Marriott Center (13,321); Provo, UT
February 18, 2023; 5:30 p.m., WCC Network		at Portland	W 103–84	21–8 (9–5)	22 – Justice	15 – Podziemski	5 – Podziemski	Chiles Center (2,621); Portland, OR
February 23, 2023; 7:00 p.m., WCC Network		Pepperdine	W 91–82	22–8 (10–5)	23 – Podziemski	18 – Podziemski	5 – Knapper	Leavey Center (2,082); Santa Clara, CA
February 25, 2023; 7:00 p.m., WCC Network		at San Diego	W 81–63	23–8 (11–5)	26 – Podziemski	10 – Podziemski	5 – Podziemski	Jenny Craig Pavilion (2,898); San Diego, CA
WCC tournament
March 4, 2023; 9:30 p.m., ESPN2	(3)	vs. (6) San Francisco; Quarterfinals	L 87–93 ^{2OT}	23–9	22 – tied	11 – Podziemski	9 – Podziemski	Orleans Arena; Paradise, NV
NIT
March 15, 2023*; 6:00 p.m., ESPN+		(3) Sam Houston; First round – Oklahoma State bracket	L 56–58	23–10	18 – Podziemski	8 – Tilly	7 – Podziemski	Leavey Center (1,203); Santa Clara, CA
*Non-conference game. ^{#}Rankings from AP poll. (#) Tournament seedings in parentheses. All times are in Pacific.
