= 2022–23 Southern Utah Thunderbirds men's basketball team =

American college basketball season

2022–23 Southern Utah Thunderbirds men's basketball

CBI, Semifinals
- Conference: Western Athletic Conference
- Record: 24–13 (12–6 WAC)
- Head coach: Flynn Clayman (interim)
- Associate head coach: Flynn Clayman
- Assistant coaches: Bryce Martin; Lourawls Nairn Jr.
- Home arena: America First Event Center

2022–23 WAC men's basketball standings
| | Conf. | | | | Overall |
| Team | W | | L | PCT | W | | L | PCT |
|---|---|---|---|---|---|---|---|---|
| Utah Valley | 15 | – | 3 | .833 | 28 | – | 9 | .757 |
| Sam Houston | 14 | – | 4 | .778 | 26 | – | 8 | .765 |
| Southern Utah | 12 | – | 6 | .667 | 24 | – | 13 | .649 |
| Grand Canyon † | 11 | – | 7 | .611 | 24 | – | 12 | .667 |
| Seattle | 11 | – | 7 | .611 | 20 | – | 12 | .625 |
| Stephen F. Austin | 11 | – | 7 | .611 | 19 | – | 13 | .594 |
| Tarleton State * | 9 | – | 9 | .500 | 17 | – | 17 | .500 |
| California Baptist | 8 | – | 10 | .444 | 17 | – | 16 | .515 |
| Abilene Christian | 7 | – | 11 | .389 | 13 | – | 17 | .433 |
| UT Rio Grande Valley | 6 | – | 12 | .333 | 15 | – | 17 | .469 |
| UT Arlington | 6 | – | 12 | .333 | 11 | – | 21 | .344 |
| Utah Tech * | 5 | – | 13 | .278 | 14 | – | 19 | .424 |
| New Mexico State ** | 2 | – | 16 | .111 | 9 | – | 15 | .375 |
† Conference tournament winner * Ineligible for the NCAA tournament due to transition from NCAA Division II ** Remaining games as of February 11, 2023 cancelled.

The 2022–23 Southern Utah Thunderbirds men's basketball team represented Southern Utah University in the 2022–23 NCAA Division I men's basketball season. The Thunderbirds, led by seventh-year head coach Todd Simon, played their home games at the America First Event Center in Cedar City, Utah, as first-year members of the Western Athletic Conference. They finished the season 24–13, 12–6 in WAC play to finish in third place. They defeated Utah Tech and Utah Valley in the WAC tournament before losing to Grand Canyon in the championship game. They received an invitation to the College Basketball Invitational tournament where they defeated North Alabama and Rice to advance to the semifinals. There they lost to Eastern Kentucky in double overtime.

On March 15, 2023, it was announced that head coach Todd Simon had been hired as the next head coach at Bowling Green, replacing Michael Huger. On April 12, the school named Western Illinois head coach Rob Jeter the team's new head coach.

== Previous season ==
The Thunderbirds finished the 2021–22 season 23–12, 14–6 in Big Sky play to finish in second place. In the Big Sky tournament, they were upset by No. 7 seed Portland State in the quarterfinals. They received an invitation to The Basketball Classic, where they defeated Kent State, UTEP, and Portland, before falling to Fresno State in the semifinals. This was the team's final season as a member of the Big Sky Conference, as they moved to the Western Athletic Conference, starting in the 2022–23 season.

== Roster ==
2022–23 Southern Utah Thunderbirds men's basketball team
Players
Coaches

| Pos. | # | Name | Height | Weight | Year | Previous school | Hometown |
|---|---|---|---|---|---|---|---|
| G | 1 | Felix Lemetti | 6 ft 1 in (1.85 m) | 175 lb (79 kg) | Jr | Omaha | Stockholm, Sweden |
| G | 2 | Deng Dut | 6 ft 4 in (1.93 m) | 192 lb (87 kg) | Jr | Wyoming | Melbourne, Australia |
| G | 3 | Drake Allen | 6 ft 4 in (1.93 m) | 190 lb (86 kg) | So | Snow College | Eagle Mountain, Utah |
| G | 4 | Braden Housley | 6 ft 4 in (1.93 m) | 180 lb (82 kg) | Fr | Skyridge High School | Lehi, Utah |
| G | 10 | Cameron Healy | 6 ft 3 in (1.91 m) | 190 lb (86 kg) | GS | Central Michigan | Sydney, Australia |
| F | 12 | Maizen Fausett | 6 ft 6 in (1.98 m) | 235 lb (107 kg) | Sr | Westlake High School | Saratoga Springs, Utah |
| G | 13 | Dee Barnes | 6 ft 4 in (1.93 m) | 193 lb (88 kg) | Sr | Mount St. Mary's | Great Mills, Maryland |
| C | 14 | Jason Spurgin | 6 ft 11 in (2.11 m) | 250 lb (113 kg) | So | Toowoomba Grammar School | Toowoomba, Australia |
| G | 15 | Harrison Butler | 6 ft 5 in (1.96 m) | 222 lb (101 kg) | Sr | Mater Dei High School | Santa Ana, California |
| F | 20 | Marshal Destremau | 6 ft 9 in (2.06 m) | 220 lb (100 kg) | Fr | Aquinas College | Perth, Australia |
| G | 21 | Josh Valentine | 6 ft 0 in (1.83 m) | 174 lb (79 kg) | RS Fr | Foothill High School | Pleasanton, California |
| C | 22 | Parsa Fallah | 6 ft 9 in (2.06 m) | 250 lb (113 kg) | RS Fr | Kouchin Amol | Amol, Iran |
| G | 23 | Andrew Marshall | 6 ft 4 in (1.93 m) | 204 lb (93 kg) | RS Fr | Coronado High School | Las Vegas, Nevada |
| G | 25 | Zion Young | 6 ft 3 in (1.91 m) | 220 lb (100 kg) | RS Jr | Oakland | Chicago, Illinois |
| G | 32 | Peter Dadson Jr. | 6 ft 4 in (1.93 m) | 195 lb (88 kg) | So | Hillcrest Prep | Sydney, Australia |
| G | 33 | Martel Williams | 6 ft 3 in (1.91 m) | 213 lb (97 kg) | RS Fr | Middlebrooks Academy | Las Vegas, Nevada |
| G | 55 | Tevian Jones | 6 ft 7 in (2.01 m) | 197 lb (89 kg) | Sr | Illinois | Chandler, Arizona |

Head coach

- Todd Simon (UNLV)

Assistant coach(es)

- Flynn Clayman (Troy)
- Bryce Martin (Boise State)
- Lourawls Nairn Jr. (Michigan State)

Legend

- (C) Team captain
- (S) Suspended
- (I) Ineligible
- (W) Walk-on
- Injured
- Current redshirt

Roster
Last update: January 5, 2023

== Schedule and results ==
| Date time, TV | Rank^{#} | Opponent^{#} | Result | Record | Site (attendance) city, state |
Non-conference regular season
| November 7, 2022*; 7:00 pm, MW Network | | at New Mexico | L 81–89 | 0–1 | The Pit (8,181); Albuquerque, NM |
| November 10, 2022*; 7:00 pm, ESPN+ | | La Verne | W 117–55 | 1–1 | America First Event Center (1,718); Cedar City, UT |
| November 12, 2022*; 7:00 pm, ESPN+ | | Saint Katherine | W 91–48 | 2–1 | America First Event Center (1,534); Cedar City, UT |
| November 14, 2022*; 7:00 pm, ESPN+ | | Bethesda | W 126–67 | 3–1 | America First Event Center (1,173); Cedar City, UT |
| November 18, 2022*; 6:00 pm, Big 12 Now | | at No. 6 Kansas | L 76–82 | 3–2 | Allen Fieldhouse (16,300); Lawrence, KS |
| November 25, 2022*; 9:00 pm, BeTheBeast | | vs. Texas State; North Shore Classic | L 65–78 | 3–3 | Cannon Activities Center (828); Laie, HI |
| November 26, 2022*; 7:30 pm, BeTheBeast | | vs. Sacramento State; North Shore Classic | W 91–87 ^{2OT} | 4–3 | Cannon Activities Center (1,344); Laie, HI |
| November 30, 2022*; 7:00 pm, ESPN+ | | Montana State | L 83–86 | 4–4 | America First Event Center (2,116); Cedar City, UT |
| December 3, 2022*; 6:00 pm, ESPN+ | | at Idaho State | W 69–59 | 5–4 | Reed Gym (1,220); Pocatello, ID |
| December 6, 2022*; 7:00 pm, ESPN+ | | West Coast Baptist | W 120–49 | 6–4 | America First Event Center (959); Cedar City, UT |
| December 10, 2022*; 5:00 pm | | vs. Cal State Fullerton; Jack Jones Hoopfest | W 67–60 | 7–4 | Michelob Ultra Arena; Paradise, NV |
| December 17, 2022*; 1:00 pm, ESPN+ | | Northern Arizona | W 106–101 ^{OT} | 8–4 | America First Event Center (873); Cedar City, UT |
| December 21, 2022*; 5:00 pm, P12N | | at Colorado | L 78–86 | 8–5 | CU Events Center (5,108); Boulder, CO |
WAC regular season
| December 28, 2022; 7:00 pm, ESPN+ | | at New Mexico State | W 79–75 | 9–5 (1–0) | Pan American Center (4,942); Las Cruces, NM |
| December 31, 2022; 1:00 pm, ESPN+ | | Texas–Rio Grande Valley | W 94–88 ^{OT} | 10–5 (2–0) | America First Event Center (1,204); Cedar City, UT |
| January 5, 2023; 6:00 pm, ESPN+ | | at Tarleton | L 65–68 | 10–6 (2–1) | Wisdom Gym (1,105); Stephenville, TX |
| January 7, 2023; 5:00 pm, ESPN+ | | at Abilene Christian | W 74–72 | 11–6 (3–1) | Moody Coliseum (1,122); Abilene, TX |
| January 12, 2023; 7:00 pm, ESPN+ | | Sam Houston | W 86–74 | 12–6 (4–1) | America First Event Center (2,178); Cedar City, UT |
| January 14, 2023; 1:00 pm, ESPN+ | | Stephen F. Austin | W 67–58 | 13–6 (5–1) | America First Event Center (1,583); Cedar City, UT |
| January 19, 2023; 7:00 pm, ESPN+ | | New Mexico State | W 111–76 | 14–6 (6–1) | America First Event Center (2,093); Cedar City, UT |
| January 21, 2023; 4:00 pm, ESPN+ | | at Seattle | L 60–81 | 14–7 (6–2) | Redhawk Center (928); Seattle, WA |
| January 26, 2023; 7:00 pm, ESPN+ | | Utah Valley | W 79–67 | 15–7 (7–2) | America First Event Center (4,013); Cedar City, UT |
| February 1, 2023; 8:00 pm, ESPN+ | | at California Baptist | W 72–71 | 16–7 (8–2) | CBU Events Center (2,705); Riverside, CA |
| February 4, 2023; 7:00 pm, ESPN+ | | at Utah Tech | L 79–86 | 16–8 (8–3) | Burns Arena (3,962); St. George, UT |
| February 9, 2023; 7:00 pm, ESPN+ | | Tarleton | W 72–62 | 17–8 (9–3) | America First Event Center (1,862); Cedar City, UT |
| February 11, 2023; 6:00 pm, ESPN+ | | at Utah Valley | L 83–90 | 17–9 (9–4) | UCCU Center (5,168); Orem, UT |
| February 17, 2023; 7:00 pm, ESPN+ | | Utah Tech | W 81–71 | 18–9 (10–4) | America First Event Center (4,554); Cedar City, UT |
| February 23, 2023; 6:00 pm, ESPN+ | | at UT Arlington | W 86–76 | 19–9 (11–4) | College Park Center (1,526); Arlington, TX |
| February 25, 2023; 3:30 pm, ESPN+ | | at Sam Houston | L 57–64 | 19–10 (11–5) | Bernard Johnson Coliseum (1,772); Huntsville, TX |
| March 1, 2023; 7:00 pm, ESPN+ | | Grand Canyon | L 78–83 | 19–11 (11–6) | America First Event Center (1,460); Cedar City, UT |
| March 3, 2023; 7:00 pm, ESPN+ | | California Baptist | W 81–71 | 20–11 (12–6) | America First Event Center (1,859); Cedar City, UT |
WAC tournament
| March 9, 2023; 8:00 pm, ESPN+ | (3) | vs. (11) Utah Tech; Quarterfinals | W 76–75 | 21–11 | Orleans Arena; Paradise, NV |
| March 10, 2023; 8:00 pm, ESPN+ | (3) | vs. (2) Utah Valley; Semifinals | W 89–88 | 22–11 | Orleans Arena (3,003); Paradise, NV |
| March 11, 2023; 8:30 pm, ESPN2 | (3) | vs. (5) Grand Canyon; Championship | L 66–84 | 22–12 | Orleans Arena; Paradise, NV |
College Basketball Invitational
| March 18, 2023; 12:30 p.m., FloHoops | (4) | vs. (13) North Alabama; First round | W 72–50 | 23–12 | Ocean Center; Daytona Beach, FL |
| March 20, 2023; 12:00 p.m., FloHoops | (4) | vs. (12) Rice; Quarterfinals | W 81–79 | 24–12 | Ocean Center; Daytona Beach, FL |
| March 21, 2023; 5:00 p.m., ESPN2 | (4) | vs. (8) Eastern Kentucky; Semifinals | L 106–108 ^{2OT} | 24–13 | Ocean Center; Daytona Beach, FL |
*Non-conference game. ^{#}Rankings from AP Poll. (#) Tournament seedings in parentheses. All times are in Mountain.
