= 2022–23 Idaho Vandals men's basketball team =

American college basketball season

2022–23 Idaho Vandals men's basketball
- Conference: Big Sky Conference
- Record: 10–22 (4–14 Big Sky)
- Head coach: Zac Claus (fired Feb. 27, 2023); Tim Marrion (interim)
- Assistant coaches: Kenny Tripp; Jeremy Harden; Jet Younker (interim)
- Home arena: ICCU Arena

2022–23 Big Sky men's basketball standings
	Conf.				Overall
Team	W		L	PCT	W		L	PCT
Eastern Washington	16	–	2	.889	23	–	11	.676
Montana State †	15	–	3	.833	25	–	10	.714
Weber State	12	–	6	.667	18	–	15	.545
Montana	10	–	7	.588	17	–	14	.548
Idaho State	8	–	10	.444	11	–	21	.344
Sacramento State	7	–	11	.389	14	–	18	.438
Portland State	6	–	11	.353	12	–	19	.387
Northern Colorado	6	–	12	.333	12	–	20	.375
Northern Arizona	5	–	13	.278	12	–	23	.343
Idaho	4	–	14	.222	10	–	22	.313
† Conference tournament winner

The 2022–23 Idaho Vandals men's basketball team represented the University of Idaho in the Big Sky Conference during the 2022–23 NCAA Division I men's basketball season. Led by fourth-year head coach Zac Claus, the Vandals played their home games on campus at ICCU Arena in Moscow, Idaho. They finished the season 10–22, 4–14 in Big Sky play, to finish in last place. They lost to Northern Arizona in the first round of the Big Sky tournament.

On February 27, 2023, following the final regular season game, the school fired head coach Zac Claus. On March 20, the school named Seattle assistant coach Alex Pribble the team's new head coach.

== Previous season ==
The Vandals finished the 2021–22 season at 9–22 (6–14 in Big Sky, eighth). In the conference tournament, they were defeated by Sacramento State in the first round.

== Roster ==
2022–23 Idaho Vandals men's basketball team
Players
Coaches

Pos.	#	Name	Height	Weight	Year	Previous school	Hometown
F	0	Michael Hanshaw	6 ft 9 in (2.06 m)	220 lb (100 kg)	Sr	Westlake HS	Moorpark, CA
G	1	RJ Walker	6 ft 1 in (1.85 m)	174 lb (79 kg)	RS Fr	Decatur Eisenhower HS	Decatur, IL
G	2	Yusef Salih	6 ft 2 in (1.88 m)	192 lb (87 kg)	So	Highland School	Gainesville, VA
F/C	3	Isaac Jones	6 ft 9 in (2.06 m)	242 lb (110 kg)	Jr	Wenatchee Valley College	Spanaway, WA
G	5	Dominique Ford	6 ft 4 in (1.93 m)	196 lb (89 kg)	So	College of Southern Nevada	Las Vegas, NV
G	10	Rashad Smith	6 ft 4 in (1.93 m)	210 lb (95 kg)	Sr	Grand Canyon	Chandler, AZ
G	11	Titus Yearout	6 ft 2 in (1.88 m)	181 lb (82 kg)	Fr	Lapwai HS	Lapwai, ID
G	13	Divant'e Moffitt	6 ft 3 in (1.91 m)	184 lb (83 kg)	Sr	Seattle Pacific	Spanaway, WA
F	15	Terren Frank	6 ft 8 in (2.03 m)	229 lb (104 kg)	RS So	Vanderbilt	Los Angeles, CA
G	21	Tyler Halligan	6 ft 4 in (1.93 m)	196 lb (89 kg)	Fr	Walsh Jesuit HS	Uniontown, OH
G	22	Mikhail Abdul-Hamid	6 ft 5 in (1.96 m)	185 lb (84 kg)	Fr	Christian Brothers College HS	St. Louis, MO
F/C	23	John Harge	6 ft 7 in (2.01 m)	238 lb (108 kg)	RS So	Northeastern Oklahoma A&M	Aurora, CO
G	33	Jack Hatten	6 ft 6 in (1.98 m)	184 lb (83 kg)	RS Fr	Garces Memorial HS	Bakersfield, CA
F	35	Nigel Burris	6 ft 7 in (2.01 m)	222 lb (101 kg)	Fr	Archbishop Mitty HS	San Francisco, CA
G	44	Trey Smith	6 ft 2 in (1.88 m)	195 lb (88 kg)	Sr	San Jose State	Cypress, CA

Head coach

- Zac Claus (Eastern Washington)

Assistant coach(es)

- Tim Marrion (Washington State)
- Kenny Tripp (Regis)
- Jeremy Harden (Arizona)
- Jet Younker (Washington State)

Legend

- (C) Team captain
- (S) Suspended
- (I) Ineligible
- (W) Walk-on
- Injured
- Current redshirt

Roster
Last update: November 18, 2022

== Schedule and results ==
Date time, TV	Rank^{#}	Opponent^{#}	Result	Record	Site (attendance) city, state
Exhibition
November 1, 2022*; 6:00 p.m.		Evergreen State	W 91–48	–	ICCU Arena; Moscow, ID
Non-conference regular season
November 7, 2022*; 4:00 p.m.		at Denver	L 63–68	0–1	Hamilton Gymnasium (1,255); Denver, CO
November 10, 2022*; 6:00 p.m., ESPN+		Walla Walla	W 122–48	1–1	ICCU Arena (1,549); Moscow, ID
November 13, 2022*; 12:05 p.m.		at Omaha	L 72–79	1–2	Baxter Arena (2,196); Omaha, NE
November 16, 2022*; 6:00 p.m., ESPN+		Cal State Bakersfield	L 43–52	1–3	ICCU Arena (2,042); Moscow, ID
November 19, 2022*; 2:00 p.m., ESPN+		Utah Tech	L 71–81	1–4	ICCU Arena (1,061); Moscow, ID
November 23, 2022*; 4:00 p.m., ESPN+		at Cal Poly; California Thanksgiving Jam	L 71–82	1–5	Mott Athletics Center (1,174); San Luis Obispo, CA
November 25, 2022*; 6:00 p.m., WCC Network		at Pacific; California Thanksgiving Jam	W 84–81	2–5	Alex G. Spanos Center (956); Stockton, CA
December 2, 2022*; 6:00 p.m., ESPN+		Northern Illinois	W 84–47	3–5	ICCU Arena (1,476); Moscow, ID
December 6, 2022*; 6:00 p.m., ESPN+		North Dakota	W 76–66	4–5	ICCU Arena (1,435); Moscow, ID
December 11, 2022*; 2:00 p.m., ESPN+		UC Riverside	L 74–76	4–6	ICCU Arena (1,294); Moscow, ID
December 16, 2022*; 6:00 p.m., ESPN+		Northwest Indian	W 125–51	5–6	ICCU Arena (1,266); Moscow, ID
December 19, 2022*; 7:00 p.m., ESPN+		at Cal State Northridge	W 76–73	6–6	Premier America Credit Union Arena (315); Northridge, CA
December 21, 2022*; 7:00 p.m., ESPN+		at Long Beach State	L 75–82	6–7	Walter Pyramid (1,114); Long Beach, CA
Big Sky regular season
December 29, 2022; 6:00 p.m., ESPN+		at Montana State	L 58–72	6–8 (0–1)	Worthington Arena (3,172); Bozeman, MT
December 31, 2022; 1:00 p.m., ESPN+		at Montana	L 56–67	6–9 (0–2)	Dahlberg Arena (3,337); Missoula, MT
January 5, 2023; 6:00 p.m., ESPN+		Sacramento State	L 83–85 ^{OT}	6–10 (0–3)	ICCU Arena (1,369); Moscow, ID
January 7, 2023; 2:00 p.m., ESPN+		Portland State	L 58–74	6–11 (0–4)	ICCU Arena (1,528); Moscow, ID
January 14, 2023; 3:30 p.m., ESPN+		at Eastern Washington	L 74–95	6–12 (0–5)	Reese Court (1,636); Cheney, WA
January 16, 2023; 6:00 p.m., ESPN+		Montana State	W 74–70	7–12 (1–5)	ICCU Arena (1,979); Moscow, ID
January 19, 2023; 5:00 p.m., ESPN+		at Northern Arizona	W 88–83	8–12 (2–5)	Findlay Toyota Court (787); Flagstaff, AZ
January 21, 2023; 5:00 p.m., ESPN+		at Northern Colorado	L 67–73	8–13 (2–6)	Bank of Colorado Arena (1,214); Greeley, CO
January 26, 2023; 6:00 p.m., ESPN+		Weber State	L 65–73	8–14 (2–7)	ICCU Arena (1,713); Moscow, ID
January 28, 2023; 2:00 p.m., ESPN+		Idaho State; Battle of the Domes	L 91–95 ^{OT}	8–15 (2–8)	ICCU Arena (2,397); Moscow, ID
February 2, 2023; 7:00 p.m., ESPN+		at Portland State	L 66–69	8–16 (2–9)	Viking Pavilion (1,089); Portland, OR
February 4, 2023; 2:00 p.m., ESPN+		at Sacramento State	W 82–76 ^{OT}	9–16 (3–9)	Hornets Nest (747); Sacramento, CA
February 11, 2023; 3:30 p.m., ESPN+		Eastern Washington	L 66–73	9–17 (3–10)	ICCU Arena (3,310); Moscow, ID
February 16, 2023; 6:00 p.m., ESPN+		Northern Colorado	W 84–82	10–17 (4–10)	ICCU Arena; Moscow, ID
February 18, 2023; 12:00 p.m., ESPN+		Northern Arizona	L 50–72	10–18 (4–11)	ICCU Arena (2,181); Moscow, ID
February 23, 2023; 6:00 p.m., ESPN+		at Idaho State; Battle of the Domes	L 55–65	10–19 (4–13)	Reed Gym (1,311); Pocatello, ID
February 25, 2023; 6:00 p.m., ESPN+		at Weber State	L 53–67	10–20 (4–13)	Dee Events Center (6,039); Ogden, UT
February 27, 2023; 6:00 p.m., ESPN+		Montana	L 53–68	10–21 (4–14)	ICCU Arena (2,047); Moscow, ID
Big Sky tournament
March 4, 2023; 5:30 p.m., ESPN+	(10)	vs. (9) Northern Arizona; First round	L 76–87	10–22	Idaho Central Arena; Boise, ID
*Non-conference game. ^{#}Rankings from AP poll. (#) Tournament seedings in parentheses. All times are in Pacific.
