= 2023 Big Sky Conference men's basketball tournament =

American collegiate postseason tournament

- Classification: Division I
- Season: 2022–23
- Teams: 10
- Site: Idaho Central Arena; Boise, Idaho
- Champions: Montana State (4th title)
- Winning coach: Danny Sprinkle (2nd title)
- Television: ESPN+, ESPNU, ESPN2

2022–23 Big Sky men's basketball standings
	Conf.				Overall
Team	W		L	PCT	W		L	PCT
Eastern Washington	16	–	2	.889	23	–	11	.676
Montana State †	15	–	3	.833	25	–	10	.714
Weber State	12	–	6	.667	18	–	15	.545
Montana	10	–	7	.588	17	–	14	.548
Idaho State	8	–	10	.444	11	–	21	.344
Sacramento State	7	–	11	.389	14	–	18	.438
Portland State	6	–	11	.353	12	–	19	.387
Northern Colorado	6	–	12	.333	12	–	20	.375
Northern Arizona	5	–	13	.278	12	–	23	.343
Idaho	4	–	14	.222	10	–	22	.313
† Conference tournament winner

The 2023 Big Sky Conference men's basketball tournament was the postseason tournament for the Big Sky Conference, held March 4–8 at Idaho Central Arena in Boise, Idaho. It was the 48th edition of the conference tourney, which debuted in 1976. Formerly concluding on Saturday, this year's edition moved to an earlier schedule, with the championship on Wednesday night.

Second-seeded Montana State defeated ninth seed Northern Arizona 85–78 in the final and received the conference's automatic bid to the NCAA tournament. The Bobcats successfully defended their conference tournament title and earned a second straight NCAA appearance, their fifth overall.

Finalist NAU upset top-seeded Eastern Washington by a point in the quarterfinals and fourth seed Montana by twelve in the semifinals. The other semifinal was rematch of the previous year, with a similar result; this time, MSU needed double overtime to eliminate third seed Weber State 60–58. In 2022, they outlasted the Wildcats by three points in regulation.

== Seeds ==
The ten teams were seeded by conference record; the top six teams received a first-round bye.

Seed	School	Record	Tiebreaker
1	Eastern Washington	16–2	—N/a
2	Montana State	15–3	—N/a
3	Weber State	12–6	—N/a
4	Montana	10–7	—N/a
5	Idaho State	8–10	—N/a
6	Sacramento State	7–11	—N/a
7	Portland State	6–11	—N/a
8	Northern Colorado	6–12	—N/a
9	Northern Arizona	5–13	—N/a
10	Idaho	4–14	—N/a

== Schedule ==
Session	Game	Time	Matchup	Score	Television	Attendance
First round – Saturday, March 4
1	1	5:30 pm	No. 9 Northern Arizona vs. No. 10 Idaho	87–79	ESPN+	
1	2	8:00 pm	No. 7 Portland State vs. No. 8 Northern Colorado	80–84	ESPN+	
Quarterfinals – Sunday, March 5
2	3	5:30 pm	No. 1 Eastern Washington vs. No. 9 Northern Arizona	80–81	ESPN+	
2	4	8:00 pm	No. 2 Montana State vs. No. 8 Northern Colorado	84–73	ESPN+	
Quarterfinals – Monday, March 6
3	5	5:30 pm	No. 4 Montana vs. No. 5 Idaho State	83–74	ESPN+	
3	6	8:00 pm	No. 3 Weber State vs. No. 6 Sacramento State	70–64	ESPN+	
Semifinals – Tuesday, March 7
4	7	6:30 pm	No. 9 Northern Arizona vs. No. 4 Montana	83–71	ESPNU	
4	8	9:00 pm	No. 2 Montana State vs. No. 3 Weber State	60–58 ^{2OT}	ESPN2	
Championship game – Wednesday, March 8
5	9	9:30 pm	No. 2 Montana State vs. No. 9 Northern Arizona	85–78	ESPN2	
Game times are in Mountain time; rankings denote tournament seeding.

== Bracket ==
First round March 4 ESPN+
9	Northern Arizona	87
10	Idaho	76
7	Portland State	80
8	Northern Colorado	84

Quarterfinals; March 5 & 6 ESPN+
1	Eastern Washington	80
9	Northern Arizona	81
4	Montana	83
5	Idaho State	74
2	Montana State	84
8	Northern Colorado	73
3	Weber State	70
6	Sacramento State	64

Semifinals; Tuesday, March 7 ESPNU/ESPN2
9	Northern Arizona	83
4	Montana	71
2	Montana State	60*
3	Weber State	58

Championship; Wednesday, March 8 ESPN2
9	Northern Arizona	78
2	Montana State	85

Note: * denotes overtime

== See also ==
- 2023 Big Sky Conference women's basketball tournament
