= 2022–23 Montana State Bobcats men's basketball team =

American college basketball season

2022–23 Montana State Bobcats men's basketball
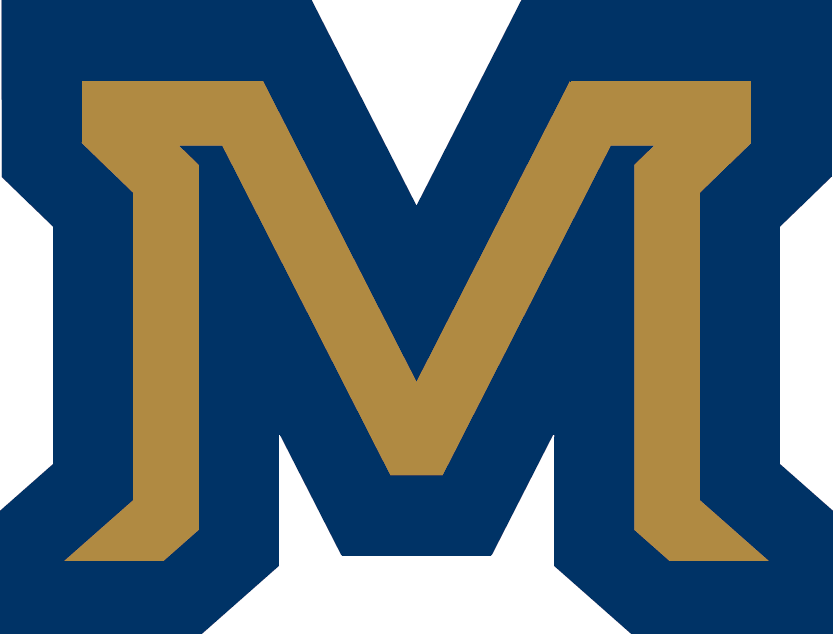

Big Sky tournament champions

NCAA tournament, first round
- Conference: Big Sky Conference
- Record: 25–10 (15–3 Big Sky)
- Head coach: Danny Sprinkle (4th season)
- Assistant coaches: Chris Haslam; Johnny Hill; Andy Hill
- Home arena: Brick Breeden Fieldhouse

2022–23 Big Sky men's basketball standings
	Conf.				Overall
Team	W		L	PCT	W		L	PCT
Eastern Washington	16	–	2	.889	23	–	11	.676
Montana State †	15	–	3	.833	25	–	10	.714
Weber State	12	–	6	.667	18	–	15	.545
Montana	10	–	7	.588	17	–	14	.548
Idaho State	8	–	10	.444	11	–	21	.344
Sacramento State	7	–	11	.389	14	–	18	.438
Portland State	6	–	11	.353	12	–	19	.387
Northern Colorado	6	–	12	.333	12	–	20	.375
Northern Arizona	5	–	13	.278	12	–	23	.343
Idaho	4	–	14	.222	10	–	22	.313
† Conference tournament winner

The 2022–23 Montana State Bobcats men's basketball team represented Montana State University (MSU) in the Big Sky Conference during the 2022–23 NCAA Division I men's basketball season. Led by fourth-year head coach Danny Sprinkle, the Bobcats played their home games on campus at Brick Breeden Fieldhouse in Bozeman, Montana. They finished the season at 25–10, 15–3 in Big Sky play, to finish in second place. In the Big Sky tournament, MSU defeated Northern Colorado, Weber State and Northern Arizona to win the tournament championship. As a result, MSU earned the conference's automatic bid to the NCAA tournament as the No. 14 seed in the East regions. They lost in the first round to Kansas State.

== Previous season ==
The Bobcats finished the 2021–22 regular season at 24–7 (16–4 in Big Sky, first). As the top seed in the conference tournament, they defeated Sacramento State, Weber State and Northern Colorado to win the title and earn the Big Sky's automatic bid to the NCAA tournament.

This was the Bobcats' first appearance in the NCAA tournament in 26 years. Seeded fourteenth in the West region, the Bobcats were defeated by twelfth-ranked Texas Tech in the first round and finished at 27–8 overall.

== Roster ==
2022–23 Montana State Bobcats men's basketball team
Players
Coaches

Pos.	#	Name	Height	Weight	Year	Previous school	Hometown
G	0	Caleb Fuller	6 ft 5 in (1.96 m)	200 lb (91 kg)	Sr	UC Davis	Ipswich, England
G	1	Patrick McMahon	6 ft 7 in (2.01 m)	190 lb (86 kg)	So	Colony HS	Palmer, AK
G	2	Nick Gazelas	6 ft 4 in (1.93 m)	180 lb (82 kg)	Jr	Jacksonville College	Humble, TX
F	3	Great Osobor	6 ft 8 in (2.03 m)	245 lb (111 kg)	So	Myerscough College	Bradford, England
F	4	Alex Germer	6 ft 8 in (2.03 m)	190 lb (86 kg)	RS Fr	Sentinel HS	Missoula, MT
G	10	Darius II Brown	6 ft 2 in (1.88 m)	195 lb (88 kg)	RS Jr	Colony HS	Pasadena, CA
G	11	Tyler Patterson	6 ft 8 in (2.03 m)	190 lb (86 kg)	So	CSUN	Snoqualmie, WA
F	13	Jubrile Belo	6 ft 9 in (2.06 m)	240 lb (109 kg)	Sr	Lamar CC	London, England
G	14	Carter Ash	6 ft 0 in (1.83 m)	165 lb (75 kg)	So	Bozeman HS	Bozeman, MT
G	20	Robert III Ford	6 ft 0 in (1.83 m)	180 lb (82 kg)	RS Jr	Idaho State	Portland, OR
G	21	RaeQuan Battle	6 ft 5 in (1.96 m)	190 lb (86 kg)	Jr	Washington	Tulalip Bay, WA
F	22	Luca Colceag	6 ft 8 in (2.03 m)	215 lb (98 kg)	Fr	FC Barcelona U18	Bilbao, Spain
G	24	Jed Miller	6 ft 2 in (1.88 m)	175 lb (79 kg)	Fr	Southern California Academy	Agoura Hills, CA
F	25	Sam Lecholat	6 ft 7 in (2.01 m)	215 lb (98 kg)	So	Sheridan HS	Sheridan, WY

Head coach

- Danny Sprinkle (Montana State)

Assistant coach(es)

- Chris Haslam (Wyoming)
- Johnny Hill (Purdue)
- Andy Hill (Eastern Washington)

Legend

- (C) Team captain
- (S) Suspended
- (I) Ineligible
- (W) Walk-on
- Injured
- Current redshirt

Roster
Last update: November 30, 2022

== Schedule and results ==
Date time, TV	Rank^{#}	Opponent^{#}	Result	Record	Site (attendance) city, state
Exhibition
October 30, 2022*; 2:00 p.m.		Montana State Billings	W 56–49	–	Brick Breeden Fieldhouse; Bozeman, MT
Regular season
November 7, 2021*; 7:00 p.m., ESPN+		at Grand Canyon	L 54–60	0–1	GCU Arena (7,171); Phoenix, AZ
November 13, 2022*; 5:00 p.m., ESPN+		at Long Beach State	W 70–57	1–1	Walter Pyramid (2,334); Long Beach, CA
November 15, 2022*; 7:00 p.m., P12N		at Oregon	L 51–81	1–2	Matthew Knight Arena (5,347); Eugene, OR
November 18, 2022*; 5:30 p.m., ESPN+		Warner Pacific	W 106–64	2–2	Brick Breeden Fieldhouse (4,207); Bozeman, MT
November 20, 2022*; 12:00 p.m., Midco+		at North Dakota	W 81–71	3–2	Betty Engelstad Sioux Center (1,225); Grand Forks, ND
November 25, 2022*; 2:30 p.m.		vs. UNC Greensboro; Northern Classic	L 66–77	3–3	Place Bell (–); Laval, QC
November 26, 2022*; 5:00 p.m.		vs. Quinnipiac; Northern Classic	L 53–70	3–4	Place Bell (–); Laval, QC
November 27, 2022*; 11:30 a.m.		vs. Middle Tennessee; Northern Classic	L 71–72	3–5	Place Bell (–); Laval, QC
November 30, 2022*; 7:00 p.m., ESPN+		at Southern Utah	W 86–83	4–5	America First Event Center (2,116); Cedar City, UT
December 8, 2022*; 7:00 p.m., ESPN+		St. Thomas (MN)	W 82–65	5–5	Brick Breeden Fieldhouse (2,609); Bozeman, MT
December 10, 2022; 4:00 p.m., ESPN+		Omaha	W 82–54	6–5	Brick Breeden Fieldhouse (1,975); Bozeman, MT
December 17, 2022; 4:00 p.m., ESPN+		Northwest Indian College	W 144–59	7–5	Brick Breeden Fieldhouse (1,627); Bozeman, MT
December 20, 2022*; 6:30 p.m., P12N		at No. 5 Arizona	L 64–85	7–6	McKale Center (13,606); Tucson, AZ
Big Sky regular season
December 29, 2022; 7:00 p.m., ESPN+		Idaho	W 72–58	8–6 (1–0)	Brick Breeden Fieldhouse (3,172); Bozeman, MT
December 31, 2022; 2:00 p.m., ESPN+		Eastern Washington	L 67–70	8–7 (1–1)	Brick Breeden Fieldhouse (3,232); Bozeman, MT
January 5, 2023; 6:00 p.m., ESPN+		at Northern Colorado	W 77–56	9–7 (2–1)	Bank of Colorado Arena (1,121); Greeley, CO
January 7, 2023; 2:00 p.m., ESPN+		at Northern Arizona	W 69–54	10–7 (3–1)	Findlay Toyota Court (1,062); Flagstaff, AZ
January 12, 2023; 7:00 p.m., ESPN+		Idaho State	W 81–68	11–7 (4–1)	Brick Breeden Fieldhouse (2,370); Bozeman, MT
January 14, 2023; 4:00 p.m., ESPN+		Weber State	W 67–52	12–7 (5–1)	Brick Breeden Fieldhouse (3,270); Bozeman, MT
January 16, 2023; 7:00 p.m., ESPN+		at Idaho	L 70–74	12–8 (5–2)	ICCU Arena (1,979); Moscow, ID
January 21, 2023; 7:00 p.m., ESPN+/SWX		at Montana	W 67–64	13–8 (6–2)	Dahlberg Arena (6,374); Missoula, MT
January 26, 2023; 8:00 p.m., ESPN+		at Portland State	W 75–66	14–8 (7–2)	Viking Pavilion (1,245); Portland, OR
January 28, 2023; 8:00 p.m., ESPN+		at Sacramento State	W 72–65	15–8 (8–2)	Hornets Nest (875); Sacramento, CA
February 2, 2023; 7:00 p.m., ESPN+		Northern Arizona	W 69–68	16–8 (9–2)	Brick Breeden Fieldhouse (3,005); Bozeman, MT
February 4, 2023; 4:00 p.m., ESPN+		Northern Colorado	W 75–62	17–8 (10–2)	Brick Breeden Fieldhouse (3,863); Bozeman, MT
February 9, 2023; 7:00 p.m., ESPN+		at Weber State	L 63–73	17–9 (10–3)	Dee Events Center (4,827); Ogden, UT
February 11, 2023; 6:00 p.m., ESPN+		at Idaho State	W 58–52	18–9 (11–3)	Reed Gym (1,625); Pocatello, ID
February 18, 2023; 7:00 p.m., ESPN+/SWX		Montana	W 72–68	19–9 (12–3)	Brick Breeden Fieldhouse (6,696); Bozeman, MT
February 23, 2023; 7:00 p.m., ESPN+		Sacramento State	W 60–56	20–9 (13–3)	Brick Breeden Fieldhouse (2,411); Bozeman, MT
February 25, 2023; 4:00 p.m., ESPN+		Portland State	W 91–78	21–9 (14–3)	Brick Breeden Fieldhouse (4,093); Bozeman, MT
February 27, 2023; 7:00 p.m., ESPN+		at Eastern Washington	W 79–74	22–9 (15–3)	Reese Court (3,353); Cheney, WA
Big Sky tournament
March 5, 2023; 8:00 p.m., ESPN+	(2)	vs. (8) Northern Colorado; Quarterfinals	W 84–73	23–9	Idaho Central Arena; Boise, ID
March 7, 2023; 9:00 p.m., ESPN2	(2)	vs. (3) Weber State; Semifinals	W 60–58 ^{2OT}	24–9	Idaho Central Arena; Boise, ID
March 8, 2023; 9:30 p.m., ESPN2	(2)	vs. (9) Northern Arizona; Championship	W 85–78	25–9	Idaho Central Arena; Boise, ID
NCAA tournament
March 17, 2023*; 7:40 p.m., CBS	(14 E)	vs. (3 E) No. 15 Kansas State; First round	L 65–77	25–10	Greensboro Coliseum (17,150); Greensboro, NC
*Non-conference game. ^{#}Rankings from AP poll. (#) Tournament seedings in parentheses. E=East. All times are in Mountain.
