= 2022–23 Weber State Wildcats men's basketball team =

American college basketball season

2022–23 Weber State Wildcats men's basketball
- Conference: Big Sky Conference
- Record: 18–15 (12–6 Big Sky)
- Head coach: Eric Duft (1st season)
- Assistant coaches: Eric Daniels; Dan Russell; Jorge Ruiz
- Home arena: Dee Events Center

2022–23 Big Sky men's basketball standings
	Conf.				Overall
Team	W		L	PCT	W		L	PCT
Eastern Washington	16	–	2	.889	23	–	11	.676
Montana State †	15	–	3	.833	25	–	10	.714
Weber State	12	–	6	.667	18	–	15	.545
Montana	10	–	7	.588	17	–	14	.548
Idaho State	8	–	10	.444	11	–	21	.344
Sacramento State	7	–	11	.389	14	–	18	.438
Portland State	6	–	11	.353	12	–	19	.387
Northern Colorado	6	–	12	.333	12	–	20	.375
Northern Arizona	5	–	13	.278	12	–	23	.343
Idaho	4	–	14	.222	10	–	22	.313
† Conference tournament winner

The 2022–23 Weber State Wildcats men's basketball team represented Weber State University in the 2022–23 NCAA Division I men's basketball season. The Wildcats, led by first-year head coach Eric Duft, played their home games at the Dee Events Center in Ogden, Utah, as members of the Big Sky Conference.

== Previous season ==
The Wildcats finished the 2021–22 season 21–12, 13–7 in Big Sky play to finish a tie for third place. As the No. 4 seed in the Big Sky tournament, they defeated Montana in the quarterfinals before losing to Northern Colorado in the semifinals. Despite having 21 wins, they were not invited to a postseason tournament. After the season, Rahe would retire as the winningest coach in Weber State and Big Sky conference history. He would be succeeded by assistant coach Eric Duft.

== Offseason ==
=== Departures ===
Name	Number	Pos.	Height	Weight	Year	Hometown	Reason for departure
David Nzekwesi	4	F/C	6'9"	250	Junior	The Nague, Netherlands	Transferred
Seikou Sisoho Jawara	5	G	6'3"	210	Sophomore	Mataró, Spain	Transferred to San Diego
Michal Kozak	11	F	6'8"	215	Senior	Plzeň, Czech Republic	Graduated
Donatas Kupsas	13	F	6'8"	210	Sophomore	Joniškis, Lithuania	Left the team for personal reasons
Josh Sanders	14	G	6'2"	180	Freshman	Kaysville, UT	Left the team for personal reasons
Koby McEwen	15	G	6'4"	195	Senior	Toronto, ON	Graduated
Dontay Bassett	21	C	6'9"	250	Senior	Oakland, CA	Graduated
Chance Trujillo	23	G	6'3"	205	Freshman	Kaysville, UT	Walk-on; left the team for personal reasons
JJ Overton	24	G/F	6'6"	190	Senior	San Diego, CA	Graduated
Jake Furgerson	25	F	6'7"	210	Sophomore	Star, ID	Walk-on; transferred
Cody Carlson	34	F/C	6'10"	230	Senior	Duluth, MN	Graduated

=== Incoming transfers ===
Name	Number	Pos.	Height	Weight	Year	Hometown	Previous School
Keith Dinwiddie Jr.	10	G	6'0"	185	Sophomore	Los Angeles, CA	San Diego State
Junior Ballard	24	G	6'3"	185	GS Senior	Stockton, CA	Fresno State
Handje Tamba	32	F	6'11"	229	RS Freshman	Knoxville, TN	Tennessee
Cole Lake	41	G	5'11"		Sophomore	Eagle, ID	Walk-on; Montana Western
Sebastian Gahse	43	F	6'10"		Junior	Stuttgart, Germany	Central Wyoming College

=== 2022 recruiting class ===
College recruiting information
Name	Hometown	School	Height	Weight	Commit date
Chris Dockery; SG	Los Angeles, CA	Middlebrooks Academy	6 ft 6 in (1.98 m)	185 lb (84 kg)	Oct 28, 2021
Chris Dockery; SG	Recruit ratings: 247Sports:				
Daniel Rouzan; PF	Las Vegas, NV	Bishop Gorman High School	6 ft 9 in (2.06 m)	236 lb (107 kg)	
Daniel Rouzan; PF	Recruit ratings: No ratings found				
JJ Louden; SG	Indianapolis, IN	Pike High School	6 ft 4 in (1.93 m)	175 lb (79 kg)	
JJ Louden; SG	Recruit ratings: No ratings found				
Louie Jordan; SF	Leicester, England	Charnwood College	6 ft 8 in (2.03 m)	N/A	Apr 4, 2022
Louie Jordan; SF	Recruit ratings: No ratings found				
Overall recruit ranking:
Note: In many cases, Scout, Rivals, 247Sports, On3, and ESPN may conflict in their listings of height and weight.; In these cases, the average was taken. ESPN grades are on a 100-point scale.; Sources: "2022 Team Ranking". Rivals.

=== 2023 recruiting class ===
College recruiting information (2023)
Name	Hometown	School	Height	Weight	Commit date
Viljami Vartiainen; SG	Helsinki, Finland	HBA Märsky	6 ft 5 in (1.96 m)	N/A	Oct 10, 2022
Viljami Vartiainen; SG	Recruit ratings: No ratings found				
Overall recruit ranking:
Note: In many cases, Scout, Rivals, 247Sports, On3, and ESPN may conflict in their listings of height and weight.; In these cases, the average was taken. ESPN grades are on a 100-point scale.; Sources: "2022 Team Ranking". Rivals.

== Roster ==
2022–23 Weber State Wildcats men's basketball team
Players
Coaches

Pos.	#	Name	Height	Weight	Year	Previous school	Hometown
G/F	0	Zahir Porter	6 ft 6 in (1.98 m)	180 lb (82 kg)	Sr	Independence CC	Bronx, NY
F	2	Dillon Jones	6 ft 6 in (1.98 m)	235 lb (107 kg)	So	Sunrise Christian Prep	Columbia, SC
G	3	KJ Cunningham	6 ft 2 in (1.88 m)	190 lb (86 kg)	Jr	Rudder HS	Bryan, TX
F	4	Dyson Koehler	6 ft 7 in (2.01 m)	220 lb (100 kg)	So	Cal Poly	Draper, UT
G	10	Keith Dinwiddie Jr.	6 ft 0 in (1.83 m)	185 lb (84 kg)	So	San Diego State	Los Angeles, CA
G	11	Steven Verplancken Jr.	6 ft 4 in (1.93 m)	205 lb (93 kg)	Jr	Southern Illinois	San Pedro, DR
G	12	Chris Dockery	6 ft 6 in (1.98 m)	185 lb (84 kg)	Fr	Bishop Gorman HS	Las Vegas, NV
C	20	Alex Tew	6 ft 11 in (2.11 m)	250 lb (113 kg)	So	Cooper International Academy	Cheshire, England
F	21	Daniel Rouzan	6 ft 9 in (2.06 m)	240 lb (109 kg)	Fr	Bishop Gorman HS	Las Vegas, NV
G	23	JJ Louden	6 ft 5 in (1.96 m)	190 lb (86 kg)	Fr	Desert Valley Prep (NV)	Indianapolis, IN
G	24	Junior Ballard	6 ft 3 in (1.91 m)	185 lb (84 kg)	Sr	Fresno State	Stockton, CA
F	30	Louie Jordan	6 ft 9 in (2.06 m)	215 lb (98 kg)	Fr	Charnwood College	Leicester, England
C	32	Handje Tamba	6 ft 11 in (2.11 m)	230 lb (104 kg)	RS Fr	Tennessee	Kinshasa, Congo
G	41	Cole Lake (W)	5 ft 11 in (1.8 m)	175 lb (79 kg)	So	Montana Western	Eagle, ID
F	43	Sebastian Gahse	6 ft 9 in (2.06 m)	235 lb (107 kg)	Jr	Central Wyoming College	Stuttgart, Germany
G	55	Abdul-Noor Beyah (W)	5 ft 9 in (1.75 m)	155 lb (70 kg)	Fr	Cedar Hill HS	Cedar Hill, TX

Head coach

- Eric Duft (Sterling (KS))

Assistant coach(es)

- Eric Daniels (Johnson & Wales)
- Dan Russell (Wyoming)
- Jorge Ruiz (Grand Canyon)

Legend

- (C) Team captain
- (S) Suspended
- (I) Ineligible
- (W) Walk-on
- Injured
- Current redshirt

Roster

== Schedule and results ==
Date time, TV	Rank^{#}	Opponent^{#}	Result	Record	Site (attendance) city, state
Exhibition
November 2, 2022*; 7:00 p.m.		Adams State	W 88–76		Dee Events Center; Ogden, UT
Non-conference regular season
November 7, 2022*; 9:00 p.m., P12N		at Washington	L 52–69	0–1	Alaska Airlines Arena (6,445); Seattle, WA
November 10, 2022*; 7:00 p.m., ESPN+		Western Colorado	W 83–67	1–1	Dee Events Center (4,113); Ogden, UT
November 14, 2022*; 7:00 p.m., MW Network		at Colorado State	L 52–77	1–2	Moby Arena (3,769); Fort Collins, CO
November 21, 2022*; 8:00 p.m., Baller TV		vs. UC Riverside; Vegas 4	L 65–72	1–3	Dollar Loan Center; Henderson, NV
November 22, 2022*; 5:30 p.m., Baller TV		vs. Abilene Christian; Vegas 4	W 77–67	2–3	Dollar Loan Center; Henderson, NV
November 23, 2022*; 2:30 p.m., Baller TV		vs. Wright State; Vegas 4	L 65–87	2–4	Dollar Loan Center; Henderson, NV
November 29, 2022*; 6:00 p.m., ESPN+		Tarleton State	L 65–75	2–5	Dee Events Center (1,873); Ogden, UT
December 3, 2022*; 7:00 p.m., ESPN+		Utah Tech	L 65–77	2–6	Dee Events Center (4,663); Ogden, UT
December 7, 2022*; 8:00 p.m., ESPN+		at California Baptist	L 52–64	2–7	CBU Events Center (2,817); Riverside, CA
December 10, 2022*; 7:00 p.m., ESPN+		Saint Martin's	W 82–58	3–7	Dee Events Center (4,459); Ogden, UT
December 14, 2022*; 8:00 p.m., ESPN+		at Cal Poly	W 74–45	4–7	Mott Athletics Center (1,329); San Luis Obispo, CA
December 19, 2022*; 7:00 p.m., MW Network		at Utah State	W 75–72	5–7	Smith Spectrum (7,000); Logan, UT
December 22, 2022*; 7:00 p.m., BYUtv		at BYU	L 57–63	5–8	Marriott Center (13,229); Provo, UT
Big Sky Conference season
December 29, 2022; 7:00 pm, ESPN+		Northern Colorado	W 81–72	6–8 (1–0)	Dee Events Center (4,861); Ogden, UT
December 31, 2022; 2:00 pm, ESPN+		Northern Arizona	W 76–60	7–8 (2–0)	Dee Events Center (4,923); Ogden, UT
January 7, 2023; 7:00 pm, ESPN+		Idaho State	L 57–67	7–9 (2–1)	Dee Events Center (5,114); Ogden, UT
January 12, 2022; 7:00 pm, ESPN+		at Montana	W 59–57	8–9 (3–1)	Dahlberg Arena (3,243); Missoula, MT
January 14, 2022; 4:00 pm, ESPN+		at Montana State	L 52–67	8–10 (3–2)	Brick Breeden Fieldhouse (3,270); Bozeman, MT
January 19, 2023; 7:00 pm, ESPN+		Portland State	W 84–68	9–10 (4–2)	Dee Events Center (4,448); Ogden, UT
January 21, 2023; 7:00 pm, ESPN+		Sacramento State	W 50–48	10–10 (5–2)	Dee Events Center (6,156); Ogden, UT
January 26, 2023; 7:00 pm, ESPN+		Idaho	W 73–65	11–10 (6–2)	Idaho Central Credit Union Arena (1,713); Moscow, ID
January 28, 2023; 3:00 pm, ESPN+		at Eastern Washington	L 71–75	11–11 (6–3)	Reese Court (2,231); Cheney, WA
February 4, 2023; 6:00 pm, ESPN+		Idaho State	W 72–71 ^{2OT}	12–11 (7–3)	Reed Gym (1,669); Pocatello, ID
February 6, 2023; 9:00 pm, ESPNU		Northern Colorado	L 54–88	12–12 (7–4)	Bank of Colorado Arena (1,503); Greeey, CO
February 9, 2023; 7:00 pm, ESPN+		Montana State	W 73–63	13–12 (8–4)	Dee Events Center (4,827); Ogden, UT
February 11, 2023; 7:00 pm, ESPN+		Montana	L 69–74	13–13 (8–5)	Dee Events Center (6,372); Ogden, UT
February 16, 2023; 8:00 pm, ESPN+		at Sacramento State	W 52–49	14–13 (9–5)	Hornets Nest (906); Sacramento, CA
February 18, 2023; 8:00 pm, ESPN+		at Portland State	W 65–57	15–13 (10–5)	Viking Pavilion (1,583); Portland, OR
February 23, 2022; 7:00 pm, ESPN+		Eastern Washington	L 82–89	15–14 (10–6)	Dee Events Center (5,817); Ogden, UT
February 25, 2023; 7:00 pm, ESPN+		Idaho	W 67–53	16–14 (11–6)	Dee Events Center (6,039); Ogden, UT
February 27, 2023; 6:00 pm, ESPN+		at Northern Arizona	W 90–89 ^{OT}	17–14 (12–6)	Findlay Toyota Court (876); Flagstaff, AZ
Big Sky tournament
March 6, 2023; 8:00 pm, ESPN+	(3)	vs. (6) Sacramento State; Quarterfinals	W 70–64	18–14	Idaho Central Arena; Boise, ID
March 7, 2023; 9:00 pm, ESPN2	(3)	vs. (2) Montana State; Semifinals	L 58–60 ^{2OT}	18–15	Idaho Central Arena; Boise, ID
*Non-conference game. ^{#}Rankings from AP Poll. (#) Tournament seedings in parentheses. All times are in Mountain.
