= 2022–23 Eastern Washington Eagles men's basketball team =

American college basketball season

2022–23 Eastern Washington Eagles men's basketball

Big Sky regular season champions

NIT, Second Round
- Conference: Big Sky Conference
- Record: 23–11 (16–2 Big Sky)
- Head coach: David Riley (2nd season)
- Associate head coach: Arturo Ormond
- Assistant coaches: Mark Darnall; Pedro Garcia Rosado
- Home arena: Reese Court

2022–23 Big Sky men's basketball standings
	Conf.				Overall
Team	W		L	PCT	W		L	PCT
Eastern Washington	16	–	2	.889	23	–	11	.676
Montana State †	15	–	3	.833	25	–	10	.714
Weber State	12	–	6	.667	18	–	15	.545
Montana	10	–	7	.588	17	–	14	.548
Idaho State	8	–	10	.444	11	–	21	.344
Sacramento State	7	–	11	.389	14	–	18	.438
Portland State	6	–	11	.353	12	–	19	.387
Northern Colorado	6	–	12	.333	12	–	20	.375
Northern Arizona	5	–	13	.278	12	–	23	.343
Idaho	4	–	14	.222	10	–	22	.313
† Conference tournament winner

The 2022–23 Eastern Washington Eagles men's basketball team represented Eastern Washington University in the Big Sky Conference during the 2022–23 NCAA Division I men's basketball season. Led by second-year head coach David Riley, the Eagles played their home games on campus at Reese Court in Cheney, Washington.

EWU finished the regular season at 21–10 (16–2 in Big Sky, first) to win the regular season championship. After clinching that title at 16–0 with two games remaining, they dropped three straight, including their opener of the conference tournament to ninth seed Northern Arizona in the quarterfinals. As a regular season champion who did not win their conference tournament, Eastern received an automatic bid to the National Invitation Tournament. The Eagles defeated Washington State in the first round before falling to Oklahoma State in the second round.

== Previous season ==
The Eagles finished the 2021–22 season at 18–16 (11–9 in Big Sky, sixth). In the conference tournament, they defeated Northern Arizona in the first round, then fell to third seed Northern Colorado in the quarterfinals. EWU was invited to The Basketball Classic, where they were defeated by Fresno State in the first round.

== Roster ==
2022–23 Eastern Washington Eagles men's basketball team
Players
Coaches

Pos.	#	Name	Height	Weight	Year	Previous school	Hometown
F	0	Cedric Coward	6 ft 6 in (1.98 m)	205 lb (93 kg)	So	Willamette	Fresno, California
G	1	Tyreese Davis	6 ft 6 in (1.98 m)	210 lb (95 kg)	RS Jr	Jacksonville	Kansas City, Missouri
G/F	2	Steele Venters	6 ft 7 in (2.01 m)	195 lb (88 kg)	RS So	Ellensburg HS	Ellensburg, Washington
F	4	LeJuan Watts	6 ft 6 in (1.98 m)	225 lb (102 kg)	Fr	Bullard HS	Fresno, California
G	5	Deon Stroud	6 ft 5 in (1.96 m)	200 lb (91 kg)	Sr	Fresno State	Fresno, California
F	10	Ethan Price	6 ft 10 in (2.08 m)	230 lb (104 kg)	So	Copleston HS	Bury St Edmunds, England
G	11	Ty Harper	6 ft 3 in (1.91 m)	175 lb (79 kg)	So	Louisiana	Norcross, Georgia
F	13	Angelo Allegri	6 ft 7 in (2.01 m)	215 lb (98 kg)	Sr	UNC Greensboro	Kansas City, Missouri
G	14	Amarion Savage	6 ft 0 in (1.83 m)	165 lb (75 kg)	Fr	TLAP Sports Academy	Aurora, Illinois
F	23	Jordan Veening	6 ft 6 in (1.98 m)	205 lb (93 kg)	RS Sr	Western Colorado	Sumas, Washington
F	25	Imhotep George	6 ft 8 in (2.03 m)	195 lb (88 kg)	Jr	Tallahassee CC	Laurel, Maryland
F	31	Casey Jones	6 ft 6 in (1.98 m)	220 lb (100 kg)	So	Wasatch Academy	Sammamish, Washington
F	32	Dane Erikstrup	6 ft 10 in (2.08 m)	240 lb (109 kg)	So	Cal Poly Pomona	Chandler, Arizona
F	34	Sebastian Andersson	6 ft 10 in (2.08 m)	235 lb (107 kg)	Fr	Korrespondensgymnasiet	Stockholm, Sweden
G	35	Ellis Magnuson	6 ft 2 in (1.88 m)	190 lb (86 kg)	Jr	Borah HS	Boise, Idaho

Head coach

- David Riley (Whitworth)

Assistant coach(es)

- Arturo Ormond (UTPA)
- Mark Darnall (Eureka)
- Pedro Garcia Rosado (Open)

Legend

- (C) Team captain
- (S) Suspended
- (I) Ineligible
- (W) Walk-on
- Injured
- Current redshirt

Roster
Last update: December 23, 2022

== Schedule and results ==
Date time, TV	Rank^{#}	Opponent^{#}	Result	Record	Site (attendance) city, state
Non-conference regular season
November 7, 2022*; 7:00 pm		at Santa Clara	L 72–84	0–1	Leavey Center (1,655); Santa Clara, CA
November 11, 2022*; 6:30 pm		vs. Yale; Outrigger Rainbow Classic	L 60–74	0–2	Stan Sheriff Center; Honolulu, HI
November 13, 2022*; 7:00 pm, ESPN+		at Hawaii; Outrigger Rainbow Classic	L 51–71	0–3	Stan Sheriff Center (4,450); Honolulu, HI
November 14, 2022*; 6:30 pm		vs. Mississippi Valley State; Outrigger Rainbow Classic	W 60–52	1–3	Stan Sheriff Center; Honolulu, HI
November 21, 2022*; 6:00 pm, SWX/ESPN+		vs. Washington State	L 56–82	1–4	Spokane Arena (5,224); Spokane, WA
November 25, 2022*; 2:30 pm		vs. Stony Brook; Florida International Tournament	W 81–52	2–4	Ocean Bank Convocation Center (35); Miami, FL
November 27, 2022*; 3:00 pm, CUSA.tv		at FIU; Florida International Tournament	L 79–90	2–5	Ocean Bank Convocation Center (310); Miami, FL
November 30, 2022*; 6:00 pm, ESPN+		Northwest	Postponed due to inclement weather		Reese Court; Cheney, WA
December 3, 2022*; 2:00 pm, ESPN+		North Dakota State	W 78–70	3–5	Reese Court (748); Cheney, WA
December 7, 2022*; 7:00 pm, P12N		at California	W 50–48	4–5	Haas Pavilion (1,297); Berkeley, CA
December 10, 2022*; 2:00 pm, ESPN3		at South Dakota State	L 76–77	4–6	Frost Arena (1,647); Brookings, SD
December 13, 2022*; 5:00 pm, ESPN+		at Texas Tech	L 70–77	4–7	United Supermarkets Arena (11,627); Lubbock, TX
December 17, 2022*; 1:00 pm, ESPN+		UC Davis	W 79–68	5–7	Reese Court (572); Cheney, WA
December 20, 2022*; 3:30 pm, ESPN+		Northwest Indian	W 130–54	6–7	Reese Court (348); Cheney, WA
Big Sky regular season
December 29, 2022; 6:00 pm, ESPN+		at Montana	W 87–80	7–7 (1–0)	Dahlberg Arena (3,924); Missoula, MT
December 31, 2022; 1:00 pm, ESPN+		at Montana State	W 70–67	8–7 (2–0)	Worthington Arena (3,232); Bozeman, MT
January 5, 2023; 6:00 pm, ESPN+		Portland State	W 92–80	9–7 (3–0)	Reese Court (587); Cheney, WA
January 7, 2023; 2:00 pm, ESPN+		Sacramento State	W 78–75	10–7 (4–0)	Reese Court; Cheney, WA
January 14, 2023; 3:30 pm, SWX/ESPN+		Idaho	W 95–74	11–7 (5–0)	Reese Court (1,636); Cheney, WA
January 16, 2023; 6:00 pm, SWX/ESPN+		Montana	W 64–57	12–7 (6–0)	Reese Court (2,244); Cheney, WA
January 19, 2023; 5:00 pm, ESPN+		at Northern Colorado	W 83–75	13–7 (7–0)	Bank of Colorado Arena (1,295); Greeley, CO
January 21, 2023; 1:00 pm, ESPN+		at Northern Arizona	W 79–76	14–7 (8–0)	Findlay Toyota Court (790); Flagstaff, AZ
January 26, 2023; 6:00 pm, ESPN+		Idaho State	W 81–68	15–7 (9–0)	Reese Court (1,613); Cheney, WA
January 28, 2023; 2:00 pm, ESPN+		Weber State	W 75–71	16–7 (10–0)	Reese Court (2,231); Cheney, WA
February 2, 2023; 7:00 pm, ESPN+		at Sacramento State	W 82–63	17–7 (11–0)	Hornets Nest (1,096); Sacramento, CA
February 4, 2023; 7:00 pm, ESPN+		at Portland State	W 98–88	18–7 (12–0)	Viking Pavilion (1,187); Portland, OR
February 11, 2023; 3:30 pm, SWX/ESPN+		at Idaho	W 73–66	19–7 (13–0)	ICCU Arena (3,310); Moscow, ID
February 16, 2023; 6:00 pm, ESPN+		Northern Arizona	W 72–55	20–7 (14–0)	Reese Court (2,010); Cheney, WA
February 18, 2023; 2:00 pm, ESPN+		Northern Colorado	W 89–77	21–7 (15–0)	Reese Court (2,754); Cheney, WA
February 23, 2023; 6:00 pm, ESPN+		at Weber State	W 89–82	22–7 (16–0)	Dee Events Center (5,817); Ogden, UT
February 25, 2023; 6:00 pm, ESPN+		at Idaho State	L 63–71	22–8 (16–1)	Reed Gym (1,692); Pocatello, ID
February 27, 2023; 6:00 pm, ESPN+		Montana State	L 74–79	22–9 (16–2)	Reese Court (3,353); Cheney, WA
Big Sky tournament
March 5, 2023; 5:30 pm, ESPN+	(1)	vs. (9) Northern Arizona; Quarterfinals	L 80–81	22–10	Idaho Central Arena; Boise, ID
NIT
March 14, 2023*; 8:00 pm, ESPNU		at (4) Washington State; First Round – Oklahoma State Bracket	W 81–74	23–10	Beasley Coliseum (1,671); Pullman, WA
March 19, 2023*; 11:00 am, ESPN2		at (1) Oklahoma State; Second Round – Oklahoma State Bracket	L 60–71	23–11	Gallagher-Iba Arena (4,978); Stillwater, OK
*Non-conference game. ^{#}Rankings from AP Poll. (#) Tournament seedings in parentheses. All times are in Pacific.
