= 2022–23 Northern Colorado Bears men's basketball team =

American college basketball season

2022–23 Northern Colorado Bears men's basketball
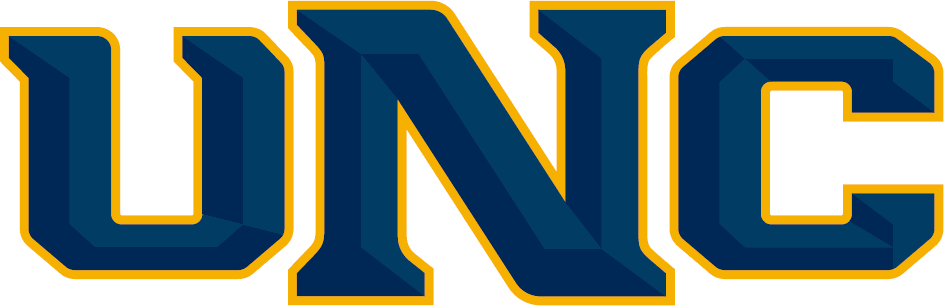
- Conference: Big Sky Conference
- Record: 12–20 (6–12 Big Sky)
- Head coach: Steve Smiley (3rd season)
- Associate head coach: Cory Fehringer
- Assistant coaches: Dorian Green; Houston Reed
- Home arena: Bank of Colorado Arena

2022–23 Big Sky men's basketball standings
	Conf.				Overall
Team	W		L	PCT	W		L	PCT
Eastern Washington	16	–	2	.889	23	–	11	.676
Montana State †	15	–	3	.833	25	–	10	.714
Weber State	12	–	6	.667	18	–	15	.545
Montana	10	–	7	.588	17	–	14	.548
Idaho State	8	–	10	.444	11	–	21	.344
Sacramento State	7	–	11	.389	14	–	18	.438
Portland State	6	–	11	.353	12	–	19	.387
Northern Colorado	6	–	12	.333	12	–	20	.375
Northern Arizona	5	–	13	.278	12	–	23	.343
Idaho	4	–	14	.222	10	–	22	.313
† Conference tournament winner

The 2022–23 Northern Colorado Bears men's basketball team represented the University of Northern Colorado in the 2022–23 NCAA Division I men's basketball season. The Bears, led by third-year head coach Steve Smiley, played their home games at Bank of Colorado Arena in Greeley, Colorado as members of the Big Sky Conference.

== Previous season ==
The Bears finished the 2021–22 season 22–16, 13–7 in Big Sky play, to finish in a tie for third place. In the Big Sky tournament, they defeated Eastern Washington and Portland State, before falling to Montana State in the championship game. They received an invite to the CBI, where they defeated Florida Atlantic and UNC Asheville, before falling to UNC Wilmington in the semifinals.

== Roster ==
2022–23 Northern Colorado Bears men's basketball team
Players
Coaches

Pos.	#	Name	Height	Weight	Year	Previous school	Hometown
G	1	Daylen Kountz	6 ft 4 in (1.93 m)	190 lb (86 kg)	GS	Colorado	Denver, CO
G	2	Matt Johnson II	6 ft 2 in (1.88 m)	190 lb (86 kg)	GS	Rangeview High School	Aurora, CO
G	3	Langston Reynolds	6 ft 4 in (1.93 m)	195 lb (88 kg)	Fr	Colorado Prep	Denver, CO
G	4	Dawson Mohr	6 ft 3 in (1.91 m)	185 lb (84 kg)	RS Fr	IMG Academy	Scottsbluff, NE
G	5	Dalton Knecht	6 ft 6 in (1.98 m)	200 lb (91 kg)	Sr	Northeastern Junior College	Thornton, CO
F	10	Jamel Melvin	6 ft 11 in (2.11 m)	210 lb (95 kg)	Jr	Potomac School	Upper Marlboro, MD
G	11	Zach Bloch	6 ft 2 in (1.88 m)	180 lb (82 kg)	So	Colorado Prep	Lawrence, KS
G	12	Connor Creech	6 ft 6 in (1.98 m)	200 lb (91 kg)	RS So	Hastings High School	Hastings, NE
F	14	Brock Wisne	6 ft 9 in (2.06 m)	230 lb (104 kg)	Fr	Colorado Prep	Thornton, CO
F	15	Juju Ramirez	6 ft 9 in (2.06 m)	220 lb (100 kg)	Fr	New Hampton High School	Lawrence, KS
F	21	Bryce Kennedy	6 ft 7 in (2.01 m)	215 lb (98 kg)	Jr	Allen High School	Allen, TX
F	22	Riley Abercrombie	6 ft 9 in (2.06 m)	220 lb (100 kg)	GS	Rice	Wollongong, Australia
G	25	Jalen Page	6 ft 5 in (1.96 m)	215 lb (98 kg)	RS So	Fairview High School	Boulder, CO
G	30	Caleb Shaw	6 ft 5 in (1.96 m)	195 lb (88 kg)	Fr	Valley Christian High School	Phoenix, AZ
C	32	Theo Hughes	7 ft 0 in (2.13 m)	260 lb (118 kg)	Jr	Barking Abbey School	Brentwood, England

Head coach

- Steve Smiley (Northern State)

Assistant coach(es)

- Cory Fehringer (Hastings)
- Dorian Green (Colorado State)
- Houston Reed (Northern State)

Legend

- (C) Team captain
- (S) Suspended
- (I) Ineligible
- (W) Walk-on
- Injured
- Current redshirt

Roster
Last update: December 15, 2022

== Schedule and results ==
Date time, TV	Rank^{#}	Opponent^{#}	Result	Record	Site (attendance) city, state
Non-conference regular season
November 7, 2022*; 6:00 pm, ESPN+		at No. 3 Houston	L 36–83	0–1	Fertitta Center (7,042); Houston, TX
November 11, 2022*; 6:00 pm, ESPN+		Texas A&M–Commerce	W 80–77	1–1	Bank of Colorado Arena (1,319); Greeley, CO
November 14, 2022*; 6:00 pm, ESPN+		at No. 5 Baylor	L 62–95	1–2	Ferrell Center (8,548); Waco, TX
November 19, 2022*; 2:00 pm, ESPN+		San Jose State	L 69–80	1–3	Bank of Colorado Arena (1,065); Greeley, CO
November 22, 2022*; 6:00 pm, ESPN+		Colorado Christian	L 69–70	1–4	Bank of Colorado Arena (1,057); Greeley, CO
November 25, 2022*; 7:30 pm		vs. North Dakota State; Lobo Classic	W 80–70	2–4	The Pit (9,033); Albuquerque, NM
November 26, 2022*; 7:30 pm		vs. Jacksonville State; Lobo Classic	W 86–82 ^{OT}	3–4	The Pit (8,715); Albuquerque, NM
November 27, 2022*; 5:30 pm, MN Network		at New Mexico; Lobo Classic	L 74–98	3–5	The Pit (8,434); Albuquerque, NM
December 3, 2022*; 2:30 pm, MW Network		at Colorado State	W 88–83	4–5	Moby Arena (5,439); Fort Collins, CO
December 10, 2022*; 8:00 pm, ESPN+		at Cal State Northridge	W 70–63	5–5	Premier America Credit Union Arena (453); Northridge, CA
December 18, 2022*; 3:00 pm, P12N		at Colorado	L 77–88	5–6	CU Events Center (6,015); Boulder, CO
December 20, 2022*; 6:00 pm, ESPN+		Air Force	L 65–67	5–7	Bank of Colorado Arena (1,601); Greeley, CO
Big Sky regular season
December 29, 2022; 7:00 pm, ESPN+		at Weber State	L 72–81	5–8 (0–1)	Dee Events Center (4,861); Ogden, UT
December 31, 2022; 6:00 pm, ESPN+		at Idaho State	L 83–90 ^{OT}	5–9 (0–2)	Reed Gym (933); Pocatello, ID
January 5, 2023; 6:00 pm, ESPN+		Montana State	L 56–77	5–10 (0–3)	Bank of Colorado Arena (1,121); Greeley, CO
January 7, 2023; 6:00 pm, ESPN+		Montana	L 74–79	5–11 (0–4)	Bank of Colorado Arena (1,221); Greeley, CO
January 12, 2023; 8:00 pm, ESPN+		at Sacramento State	L 64–72	5–12 (0–5)	Hornets Nest (613); Sacramento, CA
January 14, 2023; 8:00 pm, ESPN+		at Portland State	W 69–67	6–12 (1–5)	Viking Pavilion (1,129); Portland, OR
January 19, 2023; 6:00 pm, ESPN+		Eastern Washington	L 75–83	6–13 (1–6)	Bank of Colorado Arena (1,295); Greeley, CO
January 21, 2023; 6:00 pm, ESPN+		Idaho	W 73–67	7–13 (2–6)	Bank of Colorado Arena (1,214); Greeley, CO
January 28, 2023; 2:00 pm, ESPN+		at Northern Arizona	L 73–83	7–14 (2–7)	Findlay Toyota Court (1,617); Flagstaff, AZ
February 2, 2023; 7:00 pm, ESPN+		at Montana	L 67–69	7–15 (2–8)	Dahlberg Arena (2,990); Missoula, MT
February 4, 2023; 4:00 pm, ESPN+		at Montana State	L 62–75	7–16 (2–9)	Worthington Arena (3,863); Bozeman, MT
February 6, 2023; 9:00 pm, ESPNU		Weber State	W 88–54	8–16 (3–9)	Bank of Colorado Arena (1,503); Greeley, CO
February 9, 2023; 6:00 pm, ESPN+		Portland State	W 88–79	9–16 (4–9)	Bank of Colorado Arena (1,542); Greeley, CO
February 11, 2023; 6:00 pm, ESPN+		Sacramento State	W 70–54	10–16 (5–9)	Bank of Colorado Arena (1,265); Greeley, CO
February 16, 2023; 7:00 pm, ESPN+		at Idaho	L 82–84	10–17 (5–10)	ICCU Arena; Moscow, ID
February 18, 2023; 2:00 pm, ESPN+		at Eastern Washington	L 77–89	10–18 (5–11)	Reese Court (2,754); Cheney, WA
February 25, 2023; 1:00 pm, ESPN+		Northern Arizona	L 82–85	10–19 (5–12)	Bank of Colorado Arena (1,734); Greeley, CO
February 27, 2023; 6:00 pm, ESPN+		Idaho State	W 87–72	11–19 (6–12)	Bank of Colorado Arena (1,436); Greeley, CO
Big Sky tournament
March 4, 2023; 8:00 pm, ESPN+	(8)	vs. (7) Portland State; First round	W 84–80	12–19	Idaho Central Arena; Boise, ID
March 5, 2023; 8:00 pm, ESPN+	(8)	vs. (2) Montana State; Quarterfinals	L 73–84	12–20	Idaho Central Arena; Boise, ID
*Non-conference game. ^{#}Rankings from AP poll. (#) Tournament seedings in parentheses. All times are in Mountain.
