= 2022–23 Idaho State Bengals men's basketball team =

American college basketball season

2022–23 Idaho State Bengals men's basketball
- Conference: Big Sky Conference
- Record: 11–21 (8–10 Big Sky)
- Head coach: Ryan Looney (4th season)
- Assistant coaches: Joe White; Rosbie Mutcherson Jr.; Davis Furman
- Home arena: Reed Gym

2022–23 Big Sky men's basketball standings
	Conf.				Overall
Team	W		L	PCT	W		L	PCT
Eastern Washington	16	–	2	.889	23	–	11	.676
Montana State †	15	–	3	.833	25	–	10	.714
Weber State	12	–	6	.667	18	–	15	.545
Montana	10	–	7	.588	17	–	14	.548
Idaho State	8	–	10	.444	11	–	21	.344
Sacramento State	7	–	11	.389	14	–	18	.438
Portland State	6	–	11	.353	12	–	19	.387
Northern Colorado	6	–	12	.333	12	–	20	.375
Northern Arizona	5	–	13	.278	12	–	23	.343
Idaho	4	–	14	.222	10	–	22	.313
† Conference tournament winner

The 2022–23 Idaho State Bengals men's basketball team represented Idaho State University in the 2022–23 NCAA Division I men's basketball season. The Bengals, led by fourth-year head coach Ryan Looney, played their home games at Reed Gym in Pocatello, Idaho as members of the Big Sky Conference.

== Previous season ==
The Bengals finished the 2021–22 season 7–23, 5–15 in Big Sky play, to finish in a tie for tenth place. In the Big Sky tournament, they were defeated by Portland State in the first round.

== Roster ==
2022–23 Idaho State Bengals men's basketball team
Players
Coaches

Pos.	#	Name	Height	Weight	Year	Previous school	Hometown
G	0	AJ Burgin	6 ft 3 in (1.91 m)	205 lb (93 kg)	So	San Diego High School	San Diego, CA
F	1	Jay Nagle	6 ft 9 in (2.06 m)	215 lb (98 kg)	Sr	UC Santa Barbara	Vacaville, CA
G	2	Tommy Ball	6 ft 0 in (1.83 m)	175 lb (79 kg)	Fr	Oak Ridge High School	El Dorado Hills, CA
G	3	Ronnie Stapp	6 ft 6 in (1.98 m)	185 lb (84 kg)	Jr	Fullerton College	Bakersfield, CA
G	5	Austin Smellie	6 ft 5 in (1.96 m)	200 lb (91 kg)	Sr	Preston High School	Preston, ID
G	10	Miguel Tomley	6 ft 3 in (1.91 m)	200 lb (91 kg)	So	Santa Clara	Surrey, BC
G	11	Brock Mackenzie	6 ft 2 in (1.88 m)	185 lb (84 kg)	Sr	Point Loma	Sammamish, WA
F	12	Turner Livingston	6 ft 4 in (1.93 m)	195 lb (88 kg)	Fr	West Valley High School	Spokane, WA
F	13	Daxton Carr	6 ft 7 in (2.01 m)	215 lb (98 kg)	Jr	Cal Poly	Pocatello, ID
G	14	Jordan Hansen	6 ft 6 in (1.98 m)	215 lb (98 kg)	Fr	King's High School	Seattle, WA
F	20	Briggs Ranstrom	6 ft 6 in (1.98 m)	205 lb (93 kg)	Fr	Rocky Mountain High School	Eagle, ID
F	22	Jared Rodriguez	6 ft 8 in (2.03 m)	215 lb (98 kg)	Sr	San Diego	Glendale, AZ
G	23	Maleek Arington	6 ft 3 in (1.91 m)	200 lb (91 kg)	Fr	Auburn High School	Auburn, WA
F	24	Ed Chang	6 ft 8 in (2.03 m)	215 lb (98 kg)	Jr	Missouri	Papillion, NE
C	25	Brayden Parker	6 ft 8 in (2.03 m)	250 lb (113 kg)	Jr	College of Southern Idaho	Preston, ID
C	32	Kolby Lee	6 ft 9 in (2.06 m)	240 lb (109 kg)	Sr	BYU	Meridian, ID
C	44	Louis Stormark	6 ft 9 in (2.06 m)	250 lb (113 kg)	Fr	Get Better Academy	Allerød, Denmark

Head coach

- Ryan Looney (Eastern Oregon)

Assistant coach(es)

- Joe White (Southern Oregon)
- Rosbie Mutcherson Jr. (Covenant)
- Davis Furman (Butler)

Legend

- (C) Team captain
- (S) Suspended
- (I) Ineligible
- (W) Walk-on
- Injured
- Current redshirt

Roster
Last update: December 19, 2022

== Schedule and results ==
Date time, TV	Rank^{#}	Opponent^{#}	Result	Record	Site (attendance) city, state
Exhibition
October 29, 2022*; 7:30 pm		Walla Walla	W 92–45	–	Reed Gym; Pocatello, ID
November 1, 2022*; 7:00 pm		Park–Gilbert	W 76–38	–	Reed Gym; Pocatello, ID
Non-conference regular season
November 7, 2022*; 7:00 pm, BYUtv		at BYU	L 56–60	0–1	Marriott Center (13,972); Provo, UT
November 10, 2022*; 7:00 pm, ESPN+		Westcliff	W 97–56	1–1	Reed Gym (1,111); Pocatello, ID
November 14, 2022*; 6:00 pm, P12N		at Utah	L 58–70	1–2	Jon M. Huntsman Center (6,328); Salt Lake City, UT
November 18, 2022*; 7:00 pm, ESPN+		Denver	L 69–70	1–3	Reed Gym (1,227); Pocatello, ID
November 23, 2022*; 6:00 pm, ESPN+		at Lindenwood	L 76–77 ^{OT}	1–4	Hyland Performance Arena (731); St. Charles, MO
November 26, 2022*; 2:00 pm		vs. Bethune–Cookman; Central Arkansas Classic	L 66–68 ^{OT}	1–5	Farris Center (97); Conway, AR
November 27, 2022*; 2:30 pm, ESPN+		at Central Arkansas; Central Arkansas Classic	L 77–81	1–6	Farris Center (1,157); Conway, AR
November 29, 2022*; 6:00 pm		at Kansas City	W 75–65	2–6	Swinney Recreation Center (823); Kansas City, MO
December 3, 2022*; 6:00 pm, ESPN+		Southern Utah	L 59–69	2–7	Reed Gym (1,220); Pocatello, ID
December 6, 2022*; 7:00 pm, ESPN+		Montana Western	W 61–53	3–7	Reed Gym (1,023); Pocatello, ID
December 10, 2022*; 6:00 pm, ESPN+		St. Thomas	L 70–76	3–8	Reed Gym (1,040); Pocatello, ID
December 17, 2022*; 8:00 pm, P12N		at Washington	L 55–90	3–9	Alaska Airlines Arena (5,733); Seattle, WA
December 20, 2022*; 6:00 pm, ESPN+		at Grand Canyon	L 66–68	3–10	GCU Arena (6,804); Phoenix, AZ
Big Sky regular season
December 29, 2022; 7:00 pm, ESPN+		Northern Arizona	W 79–53	4–10 (1–0)	Reed Gym (1,007); Pocatello, ID
December 31, 2022; 6:00 pm, ESPN+		Northern Colorado	W 90–83	5–10 (2–0)	Reed Gym (933); Pocatello, ID
January 7, 2023; 6:00 pm, ESPN+		at Weber State	W 67–57	6–10 (3–0)	Dee Events Center (5,114); Ogden, UT
January 12, 2023; 7:00 pm, ESPN+		at Montana State	L 68–81	6–11 (3–1)	Worthington Arena (2,370); Bozeman, MT
January 14, 2023; 7:00 pm, ESPN+		at Montana	L 55–84	6–12 (3–2)	Dahlberg Arena (3,543); Missoula, MT
January 19, 2023; 7:00 pm, ESPN+		Sacramento State	W 65–61	7–12 (4–2)	Reed Gym (1,096); Pocatello, ID
January 21, 2023; 6:00 pm, ESPN+		Portland State	L 65–72	7–13 (4–3)	Reed Gym (1,644); Pocatello, ID
January 26, 2023; 7:00 pm, ESPN+		at Eastern Washington	L 68–81	7–14 (4–4)	Reese Court (1,613); Cheney, WA
January 28, 2023; 3:00 pm, ESPN+		at Idaho; Battle of the Domes	W 95–91 ^{OT}	8–14 (5–4)	ICCU Arena (2,397); Moscow, ID
February 4, 2023; 6:00 pm, ESPN+		Weber State	L 71–72 ^{2OT}	8–15 (5–5)	Reed Gym (1,669); Pocatello, ID
February 6, 2023; 6:00 pm, ESPN+		at Northern Arizona	W 75–70	9–15 (6–5)	Findlay Toyota Court (651); Flagstaff, AZ
February 9, 2023; 7:00 pm, ESPN+		Montana	L 61–69	9–16 (6–6)	Reed Gym (1,445); Pocatello, ID
February 11, 2023; 6:00 pm, ESPN+		Montana State	L 52–58	9–17 (6–7)	Reed Gym (1,625); Pocatello, ID
February 16, 2023; 8:00 pm, ESPN+		at Portland State	L 70–79	9–18 (6–8)	Viking Pavilion (1,263); Portland, OR
February 18, 2023; 8:00 pm, ESPN+		at Sacramento State	L 65–70	9–19 (6–9)	Hornets Nest (975); Sacramento, CA
February 23, 2023; 7:00 pm, ESPN+		Idaho; Battle of the Domes	W 65–55	10–19 (7–9)	Reed Gym (1,311); Pocatello, ID
February 25, 2023; 6:00 pm, ESPN+		Eastern Washington	W 71–63	11–19 (8–9)	Reed Gym (1,692); Pocatello, ID
February 27, 2023; 6:00 pm, ESPN+		at Northern Colorado	L 72–87	11–20 (8–10)	Bank of Colorado Arena (1,436); Greeley, CO
Big Sky tournament
March 6, 2023; 5:30 pm, ESPN+	(5)	vs. (4) Montana; Quarterfinals	L 74–83	11–21	Idaho Central Arena; Boise, ID
*Non-conference game. ^{#}Rankings from AP poll. (#) Tournament seedings in parentheses. All times are in Mountain.
