= 2022–23 Montana Grizzlies basketball team =

Basketball team in Montana

2022–23 Montana Grizzlies basketball
- Conference: Big Sky Conference
- Record: 17–14 (10–7 Big Sky)
- Head coach: Travis DeCuire (9th season)
- Associate head coach: Chris Cobb
- Assistant coaches: Jay Flores; Zach Payne
- Home arena: Dahlberg Arena

2022–23 Big Sky men's basketball standings
	Conf.				Overall
Team	W		L	PCT	W		L	PCT
Eastern Washington	16	–	2	.889	23	–	11	.676
Montana State †	15	–	3	.833	25	–	10	.714
Weber State	12	–	6	.667	18	–	15	.545
Montana	10	–	7	.588	17	–	14	.548
Idaho State	8	–	10	.444	11	–	21	.344
Sacramento State	7	–	11	.389	14	–	18	.438
Portland State	6	–	11	.353	12	–	19	.387
Northern Colorado	6	–	12	.333	12	–	20	.375
Northern Arizona	5	–	13	.278	12	–	23	.343
Idaho	4	–	14	.222	10	–	22	.313
† Conference tournament winner

The 2022–23 Montana Grizzlies basketball team represented the University of Montana in the 2022–23 NCAA Division I men's basketball season. The Grizzlies, led by ninth-year head coach Travis DeCuire, played their home games at Dahlberg Arena in Missoula, Montana as members of the Big Sky Conference.

== Previous season ==
The Grizzlies finished the 2021–22 season 18–14, 11–9 in Big Sky play to finish in a tie for seventh place. In the Big Sky tournament, they were defeated by Weber State in the quarterfinals.

== Roster ==
2022–23 Montana Grizzlies men's basketball team
Players
Coaches

Pos.	#	Name	Height	Weight	Year	Previous school	Hometown
F	0	Rhett Reynolds	6 ft 9 in (2.06 m)	199 lb (90 kg)	Fr	Shelby High School	Shelby, Montana
G	1	Lonnell Martin Jr.	6 ft 4 in (1.93 m)	207 lb (94 kg)	RS Jr	Otero College	Flint, Michigan
F	2	Trey Lawrence	6 ft 5 in (1.96 m)	173 lb (78 kg)	Jr	Bellevue College	Snohomish, Washington
G	3	Josh Vazquez	6 ft 3 in (1.91 m)	177 lb (80 kg)	Sr	Bishop Montgomery High School	Torrance, California
F	5	Jaxon Nap	6 ft 7 in (2.01 m)	205 lb (93 kg)	Fr	Hazen High School	Renton, Washington
F	10	John Solomon	6 ft 8 in (2.03 m)	211 lb (96 kg)	RS Fr	Riverview High School	Sarasota, Florida
G	11	Aanen Moody	6 ft 3 in (1.91 m)	184 lb (83 kg)	RS Sr	Southern Utah	Dickinson, North Dakota
G	12	Brandon Whitney	6 ft 1 in (1.85 m)	183 lb (83 kg)	Jr	Bishop Alemany High School	Mission Hills, California
F	13	Josh Bannan	6 ft 10 in (2.08 m)	222 lb (101 kg)	Jr	UC Lake Ginninderra	Melbourne, Australia
G	15	Dorell Thomas	6 ft 5 in (1.96 m)	185 lb (84 kg)	Fr	Skyline Prep	Durham, North Carolina
G	20	Jonathan Brown	6 ft 3 in (1.91 m)	190 lb (86 kg)	RS Jr	Central Methodist	London, England
F	21	Laolu Oke	6 ft 8 in (2.03 m)	218 lb (99 kg)	RS Jr	MSU Denver	Aurora, Colorado
G	22	Isaiah Kerr	6 ft 3 in (1.91 m)	184 lb (83 kg)	Fr	Saint Francis High School	Palo Alto, California
F	23	Mack Anderson	6 ft 9 in (2.06 m)	225 lb (102 kg)	RS Sr	Bozeman High School	Bozeman, Montana
F	24	Dischon Thomas	6 ft 9 in (2.06 m)	236 lb (107 kg)	RS Jr	Colorado State	Durham, North Carolina
F	30	Caden Bateman	6 ft 7 in (2.01 m)	200 lb (91 kg)	Fr	Big Sky High School	Missoula, Montana

Head coach

- Travis DeCuire (Montana)

Assistant coach(es)

- Chris Cobb (Menlo)
- Jay Flores (Chico State)
- Zach Payne (Whitworth)

Legend

- (C) Team captain
- (S) Suspended
- (I) Ineligible
- (W) Walk-on
- Injured
- Current redshirt

Roster

== Schedule and results ==
Date time, TV	Rank^{#}	Opponent^{#}	Result	Record	Site (attendance) city, state
Non-conference regular season
November 8, 2022*; 5:00 p.m., ESPN+		at Duquesne	L 63–91	0–1	UPMC Cooper Fieldhouse (2,157); Pittsburgh, PA
November 11, 2022*; 6:00 p.m., FS2		at Xavier	L 64–86	0–2	Cintas Center (10,311); Cincinnati, OH
November 17, 2022*; 7:30 p.m., ESPN+		St. Thomas; Zootown Classic	W 78–59	1–2	Dahlberg Arena (2,660); Missoula, MT
November 18, 2022*; 7:30 p.m., ESPN+		Merrimack; Zootown Classic	W 62–51	2–2	Dahlberg Arena (2,547); Missoula, MT
November 19, 2022*; 7:30 p.m., ESPN+		Troy; Zootown Classic	L 62–73	2–3	Dahlberg Arena (2,644); Missoula, MT
November 22, 2022*; 7:00 p.m., ESPN+		MSU–Northern	W 63–51	3–3	Dahlberg Arena (2,652); Missoula, MT
November 27, 2022*; 1:00 p.m., Altitude		at Air Force	L 56–59	3–4	Clune Arena (1,196); Colorado Springs, CO
November 29, 2022*; 6:00 p.m., ESPN+		at Southern Miss	L 54–64	3–5	Reed Green Coliseum (3,022); Hattiesburg, MS
December 6, 2022*; 7:00 p.m., ESPN+		South Dakota State	W 81–56	4–5	Dahlberg Arena (2,559); Missoula, MT
December 10, 2022*; 6:00 p.m., ESPN+		at North Dakota State	W 82–75	5–5	Scheels Center (1,658); Fargo, ND
December 17, 2022*; 10:50 a.m., HBCU Go		vs. Prairie View A&M; Coaches Vs. Racism	W 81–76	6–5	Delmar Fieldhouse (1,243); Houston, TX
December 20, 2022*; 7:00 p.m., Stadium		at No. 11 Gonzaga	L 75–85	6–6	McCarthey Athletic Center (6,000); Spokane, WA
Big Sky regular season
December 29, 2022; 7:00 p.m., ESPN+		Eastern Washington	L 80–87	6–7 (0–1)	Dahlberg Arena (3,924); Missoula, MT
December 31, 2022; 2:00 p.m., ESPN+		Idaho	W 67–56	7–7 (1–1)	Dahlberg Arena (3,337); Missoula, MT
January 5, 2023; 6:00 p.m., ESPN+		at Northern Arizona	L 74–75 ^{OT}	7–8 (1–2)	Findlay Toyota Court (363); Flagstaff, AZ
January 7, 2023; 6:00 p.m., ESPN+		at Northern Colorado	W 79–74	8–8 (2–2)	Bank of Colorado Arena (1,221); Greeley, CO
January 12, 2023; 7:00 p.m., ESPN+		Weber State	L 57–59	8–9 (2–3)	Dahlberg Arena (3,243); Missoula, MT
January 14, 2023; 7:00 p.m., ESPN+		Idaho State	W 84–55	9–9 (3–3)	Dahlberg Arena (3,543); Missoula, MT
January 16, 2023; 7:00 p.m., ESPN+		at Eastern Washington	L 57–64	9–10 (3–4)	Reese Court (2,244); Cheney, WA
January 21, 2023; 7:00 p.m., ESPN+		Montana State	L 64–67	9–11 (3–5)	Dahlberg Arena (6,374); Missoula, MT
January 26, 2023; 8:00 p.m., ESPN+		at Sacramento State	L 48–67	9–12 (3–6)	Hornets Nest (714); Sacramento, CA
January 28, 2023; 8:00 p.m., ESPN+		at Portland State	W 73–67	10–12 (4–6)	Viking Pavilion (1,188); Portland, OR
February 2, 2023; 7:00 p.m., ESPN+		Northern Colorado	W 69–67	11–12 (5–6)	Dahlberg Arena (2,990); Missoula, MT
February 4, 2023; 7:00 p.m., ESPN+		Northern Arizona	W 67–66	12–12 (6–6)	Dahlberg Arena (4,527); Missoula, MT
February 9, 2023; 7:00 p.m., ESPN+		at Idaho State	W 69–61	13–12 (7–6)	Reed Gym (1,445); Pocatello, ID
February 11, 2023; 7:00 p.m., ESPN+		at Weber State	W 74–69	14–12 (8–6)	Dee Events Center (6,372); Ogden, UT
February 18, 2023; 7:00 p.m., ESPN+		at Montana State	L 68–72	14–13 (8–7)	Brick Breeden Fieldhouse (6,696); Bozeman, MT
February 25, 2023; 7:00 p.m., ESPN+		Sacramento State	W 74–72	15–13 (9–7)	Dahlberg Arena (3,831); Missoula, MT
February 27, 2023; 7:00 p.m., ESPN+		at Idaho	W 68–53	16–13 (10–7)	ICCU Arena (2,047); Moscow, ID
Big Sky tournament
March 6, 2023; 5:30 pm, ESPN+	(4)	vs. (5) Idaho State; Quarterfinals	W 83–74	17–13	Idaho Central Arena; Boise, ID
March 7, 2023; 6:30 pm, ESPNU	(4)	vs. (9) Northern Arizona; Semifinals	L 71–83	17–14	Idaho Central Arena; Boise, ID
*Non-conference game. ^{#}Rankings from AP Poll. (#) Tournament seedings in parentheses. All times are in Mountain.
