= 2022–23 Northern Arizona Lumberjacks men's basketball team =

American college basketball season

2022–23 Northern Arizona Lumberjacks men's basketball
- Conference: Big Sky Conference
- Record: 12–23 (5–13 Big Sky)
- Head coach: Shane Burcar (4th season)
- Assistant coaches: Jake Ricciardi; Gary Bell Jr.
- Home arena: Rolle Activity Center; Findlay Toyota Court

2022–23 Big Sky men's basketball standings
	Conf.				Overall
Team	W		L	PCT	W		L	PCT
Eastern Washington	16	–	2	.889	23	–	11	.676
Montana State †	15	–	3	.833	25	–	10	.714
Weber State	12	–	6	.667	18	–	15	.545
Montana	10	–	7	.588	17	–	14	.548
Idaho State	8	–	10	.444	11	–	21	.344
Sacramento State	7	–	11	.389	14	–	18	.438
Portland State	6	–	11	.353	12	–	19	.387
Northern Colorado	6	–	12	.333	12	–	20	.375
Northern Arizona	5	–	13	.278	12	–	23	.343
Idaho	4	–	14	.222	10	–	22	.313
† Conference tournament winner

The 2022–23 Northern Arizona Lumberjacks men's basketball team represented Northern Arizona University in the 2022–23 NCAA Division I men's basketball season. The Lumberjacks were led by fourth-year head coach Shane Burcar, and played their home games at the Rolle Activity Center and Findlay Toyota Court in Flagstaff, Arizona as members of the Big Sky Conference. They finished the season 9–22, 5–13 in Big Sky play, to finish in ninth place. They defeated Idaho, Eastern Washington and Montana to advance to the championship game of the Big Sky tournament, their first appearance in the conference finals since 2008. There they lost to Montana State, closing their season with a 12–23 record.

== Previous season ==
The Lumberjacks finished the 2021–22 season 9–23, 5–15 in Big Sky play, to finish in a tie for last place. As the No. 11 seed in the Big Sky tournament, they lost to Eastern Washington in the first round.

== Roster ==
2022–23 Northern Arizona Lumberjacks men's basketball team
Players
Coaches

Pos.	#	Name	Height	Weight	Year	Previous school	Hometown
G	0	C.J. Ford	6 ft 0 in (1.83 m)	185 lb (84 kg)	Fr	Duncanville High School	Crowley, TX
G	2	Xavier Fuller	6 ft 5 in (1.96 m)	180 lb (82 kg)	GS	South Dakota	Mesa, AZ
G	3	Jayden Jackson	6 ft 4 in (1.93 m)	205 lb (93 kg)	So	Whitefish Bay High School	Milwaukee, WI
G	4	Oakland Fort	5 ft 10 in (1.78 m)	170 lb (77 kg)	Fr	Sunnyslope High School	Phoenix, AZ
G	5	Preston Kilbert	5 ft 11 in (1.8 m)	170 lb (77 kg)	Fr	Clovis West High School	Fresno, CA
F	10	Jack Wistrcill	6 ft 8 in (2.03 m)	225 lb (102 kg)	Fr	Olympus High School	Salt Lake City, UT
G	11	Ryan Abelman	6 ft 3 in (1.91 m)	185 lb (84 kg)	Fr	Bishop Gorman High School	Las Vegas, NV
F	12	Diego Campisano	6 ft 5 in (1.96 m)	210 lb (95 kg)	RS Fr	Torrey Pines High School	San Diego, CA
F	13	Keith Haymon	6 ft 7 in (2.01 m)	195 lb (88 kg)	RS Jr	Cypress Ranch High School	Cypress, TX
F	14	Will Coates	6 ft 7 in (2.01 m)	180 lb (82 kg)	Fr	Phoenix Prep	Phoenix, AZ
G	15	Jalen Cone	5 ft 11 in (1.8 m)	175 lb (79 kg)	Jr	Virginia Tech	Walkertown, NC
F	20	Nik Mains	6 ft 8 in (2.03 m)	215 lb (98 kg)	RS Sr	Pinnacle High School	Scottsdale, AZ
G	21	Liam Lloyd	6 ft 5 in (1.96 m)	190 lb (86 kg)	So	Grand Canyon	Spokane, WA
C	23	Ezekiel Richards	6 ft 10 in (2.08 m)	240 lb (109 kg)	RS Jr	Santa Clara	Oak Park, CA
G	24	Trent McLaughlin	6 ft 6 in (1.98 m)	200 lb (91 kg)	So	Central Connecticut	Chandler, AZ
G	31	Jason Parent	6 ft 4 in (1.93 m)	180 lb (82 kg)	Fr	Prescott High School	Prescott, AZ
F	33	Carson Towt	6 ft 7 in (2.01 m)	235 lb (107 kg)	So	California Baptist	Gilbert, AZ

Head coach

- Shane Burcar Ottawa

Assistant coach(es)

- Jake Ricciardi (Memphis)
- Gary Bell Jr. (Gonzaga)

Legend

- (C) Team captain
- (S) Suspended
- (I) Ineligible
- (W) Walk-on
- Injured
- Current redshirt

Roster
Last update: December 23, 2022

== Schedule and results ==
Date time, TV	Rank^{#}	Opponent^{#}	Result	Record	Site (attendance) city, state
Exhibition
November 1, 2022*; 6:00 p.m.		SAGU American Indian College	W 115–63	–	Rolle Activity Center; Flagstaff, AZ
Non-conference regular season
November 7, 2022*; 5:00 p.m., BTN+		at Michigan State	L 55–73	0–1	Breslin Center (14,797); East Lansing, MI
November 10, 2022*; 7:00 p.m., P12N		at Arizona State	L 68–84	0–2	Desert Financial Arena (6,925); Tempe, AZ
November 12, 2022*; 2:00 p.m., ESPN+		at Utah Valley	L 69–73	0–3	UCCU Center (2,034); Orem, UT
November 15, 2022*; 6:00 p.m., ESPN+		Benedictine Mesa	W 105–49	1–3	Rolle Activity Center (443); Flagstaff, AZ
November 18, 2022*; 6:00 p.m., ESPN+		UC Santa Barbara	W 63–54	2–3	Rolle Activity Center (463); Flagstaff, AZ
November 21, 2022*; 6:30 p.m., LHN		vs. No. 4 Texas; Leon Black Classic	L 48–73	2–4	Bert Ogden Arena (6,674); Edinburg, TX
November 22, 2022*; 5:30 p.m., ESPN+		at Texas–Rio Grande Valley; Leon Black Classic	L 79–91	2–5	Bert Ogden Arena (1,355); Edinburg, TX
November 27, 2022*; 1:00 p.m., ESPN+		Abilene Christian	L 82–92	2–6	Rolle Activity Center (266); Flagstaff, AZ
November 29, 2022*; 6:00 p.m., ESPN+		Ottawa (AZ)	W 82–51	3–6	Rolle Activity Center (314); Flagstaff, AZ
December 3, 2022*; 6:00 p.m., WCC Network		at Pepperdine	L 69–88	3–7	Firestone Fieldhouse (351); Malibu, CA
December 6, 2022*; 8:00 p.m., WCC Network		at Pacific	W 73–69	4–7	Alex G. Spanos Center (852); Stockton, CA
December 10, 2022*; 2:00 p.m., ESPN+		Utah Valley	L 75–80 ^{OT}	4–8	Rolle Activity Center (676); Flagstaff, AZ
December 17, 2022*; 1:00 p.m., ESPN+		at Southern Utah	L 101–106 ^{OT}	4–9	America First Event Center (873); Cedar City, UT
Big Sky Conference season
December 29, 2022; 7:00 p.m., ESPN+		at Idaho State	L 53–79	4–10 (0–1)	Reed Gym (1,007); Pocatello, ID
December 31, 2022; 2:00 p.m., ESPN+		at Weber State	L 60–76	4–11 (0–2)	Dee Events Center (4,923); Ogden, UT
January 5, 2023; 6:00 p.m., ESPN+		Montana	W 75–74 ^{OT}	5–11 (1–2)	Findlay Toyota Court (363); Flagstaff, AZ
January 7, 2023; 2:00 p.m., ESPN+		Montana State	L 54–69	5–12 (1–3)	Findlay Toyota Court (1,062); Flagstaff, AZ
January 12, 2023; 8:00 p.m., ESPN+		at Portland State	L 74–75	5–13 (1–4)	Viking Pavilion (776); Portland, OR
January 14, 2023; 3:00 p.m., ESPN+		at Sacramento State	L 56–59	5–14 (1–5)	Hornets Nest (475); Sacramento, CA
January 19, 2023; 6:00 p.m., ESPN+		Idaho	L 83–88	5–15 (1–6)	Findlay Toyota Court (787); Flagstaff, AZ
January 21, 2023; 2:00 p.m., ESPN+		Eastern Washington	L 76–79	5–16 (1–7)	Findlay Toyota Court (790); Flagstaff, AZ
January 28, 2023; 1:00 p.m., ESPN+		Northern Colorado	W 83–73	6–16 (2–7)	Findlay Toyota Court (1,617); Flagstaff, AZ
February 2, 2023; 7:00 p.m., ESPN+		at Montana State	L 68–69	6–17 (2–8)	Worthington Arena (3,005); Bozeman, MT
February 4, 2023; 7:00 p.m., ESPN+		at Montana	L 66–67	6–18 (2–9)	Dahlberg Arena (4,527); Missoula, MT
February 6, 2023; 6:00 p.m., ESPN+		Idaho State	L 70–75	6–19 (2–10)	Findlay Toyota Court (651); Flagstaff, AZ
February 9, 2023; 6:00 p.m., ESPN+		Sacramento State	W 77–55	7–19 (3–10)	Findlay Toyota Court (847); Flagstaff, AZ
February 11, 2023; 2:00 p.m., ESPN+		Portland State	L 87–88	7–20 (3–11)	Findlay Toyota Court (1,211); Flagstaff, AZ
February 16, 2023; 7:00 p.m., ESPN+		at Eastern Washington	L 55–72	7–21 (3–12)	Reese Court (2,010); Cheney, WA
February 18, 2023; 1:00 p.m., ESPN+		at Idaho	W 72–50	8–21 (4–12)	ICCU Arena (2,181); Moscow, ID
February 25, 2023; 1:00 p.m., ESPN+		at Northern Colorado	W 85–82	9–21 (5–12)	Bank of Colorado Arena (1,734); Greeley, CO
February 27, 2023; 6:00 p.m., ESPN+		Weber State	L 89–90 ^{OT}	9–22 (5–13)	Findlay Toyota Court (876); Flagstaff, AZ
Big Sky tournament
March 4, 2023; 5:30 p.m., ESPN+	(9)	vs. (10) Idaho; First round	W 87–76	10–22	Idaho Central Arena; Boise, ID
March 5, 2023; 5:30 p.m., ESPN+	(9)	vs. (1) Eastern Washington; Quarterfinals	W 81–80	11–22	Idaho Central Arena; Boise, ID
March 7, 2023; 6:30 p.m., ESPNU	(9)	vs. (4) Montana; Semifinals	W 83–71	12–22	Idaho Central Arena; Boise, ID
March 8, 2023; 9:30 p.m., ESPN2	(9)	vs. (2) Montana State; Championship	L 78–85	12–23	Idaho Central Arena; Boise, ID
*Non-conference game. ^{#}Rankings from AP poll. (#) Tournament seedings in parentheses. All times are in Mountain.
