= 2024–25 Wyoming Cowboys basketball team =

American college basketball season

2024–25 Wyoming Cowboys basketball
- Conference: Mountain West Conference
- Record: 12–20 (5–15 MW)
- Head coach: Sundance Wicks (1st season)
- Assistant coaches: Pat Monaghan; Nic Reynolds; Nick Whitmore; Shaun Vandiver
- Home arena: Arena-Auditorium

2024–25 Mountain West Conference men's basketball standings
	Conf.				Overall
Team	W		L	PCT	W		L	PCT
New Mexico	17	–	3	.850	27	–	8	.771
Colorado State †	16	–	4	.800	26	–	10	.722
Utah State	15	–	5	.750	26	–	8	.765
San Diego State	14	–	6	.700	21	–	10	.677
Boise State	14	–	6	.700	26	–	11	.703
UNLV	11	–	9	.550	18	–	15	.545
Nevada	8	–	12	.400	17	–	16	.515
San Jose State	7	–	13	.350	15	–	20	.429
Wyoming	5	–	15	.250	12	–	20	.375
Fresno State	2	–	18	.100	6	–	26	.188
Air Force	1	–	19	.050	4	–	28	.125
† 2025 Mountain West tournament winner

The 2024–25 Wyoming Cowboys basketball team represented the University of Wyoming during the 2024–25 NCAA Division I men's basketball season. The Cowboys, led by Sundance Wicks in his first season as head coach, played their home games for the 43rd season at the Arena-Auditorium in Laramie, Wyoming. They participated in the Mountain West Conference for the 26th season.

== Previous season ==
The Cowboys finished the 2023–24 season 15–17, 8–10 in Mountain West play to finish in eighth place. They lost to Fresno State in the first round of the Mountain West tournament.

== Offseason ==
Head coach Jeff Linder resigned to join Texas Tech as an assistant coach. Assistant coach Ken DeWeese left the program to join the Colorado State coaching staff, and assistant coach Bryston Williams left the program to join the Drake coaching staff.

Former Wyoming assistant Sundance Wicks was hired as head coach after one season as head coach at Green Bay. Pat Monaghan and Nic Reynolds were hired as assistant coaches on Wicks' staff, also from Green Bay. Nick Whitmore and Shaun Vandiver were retained from Linder's staff.

=== Departures ===
The Cowboys had 6 players enter the transfer portal at the conclusion of the 2023–24 season. They also had three players graduate and exhaust their eligibility.

Name	Number	Pos.	Height	Weight	Year	Hometown	Reason for departure
Brendan Wenzel	1	G	6'7"	208	SR	San Antonio, Texas	Transferred to TCU
Sam Griffin	3	G	6'3"	188	SR	Miami, Florida	Graduated
Cam Manyawu	5	F	6'9"	228	FR	Kansas City, Missouri	Transferred to Drake
Jonas Sirtautas	7	F	6'10"	185	FR	Kaunas, Lithuania	Transferred to Radford
Kael Combs	11	G	6'4"	190	FR	Nixa, Missouri	Transferred to Drake
Akuel Kot	13	G	6'2"	167	SR	Amarillo, Texas	Graduated
Kenny Foster	22	G	6'5"	193	SR	Aurora, Colorado	Graduated
Jacob Theodosiou	24	G	6'4"	188	FR	Waterloo, Canada	Transferred to Loyola (MD)
Mason Walters	33	F	6'9"	221	GS	Jamestown, North Dakota	Graduated
Caden Powell	44	F	6'10"	220	SO	Waco, Texas	Transferred to Rice

=== Incoming transfers ===
Wyoming brought in 9 players via the transfer portal.

Name	Number	Pos.	Height	Weight	Year	Hometown	Previous School
A.J. Wills	3	G	6'2"	160	SO	Richmond, Virginia	Holy Cross
Obi Agbim	5	G	6'3"	180	SR	Aurora, Colorado	Fort Lewis College
Matija Belic	7	F	6'7"	205	JR	Belgrade, Serbia	UC Santa Barbara
Cole Henry	8	F	6'9"	240	GS	Oskaloosa, Iowa	Northern Iowa
Abou Magassa	9	F	6'7"	215	RFR	Morsang-sur-Orge, France	Saint Louis
Dontaie Allen	11	G	6'6"	210	SR	Falmouth, Kentucky	Western Kentucky
Scottie Ebube	12	C	6'10"	275	JR	Mundelein, Illinois	Southern Illinois
Jordan Nesbitt	16	G	6'6"	210	SR	St. Louis, Missouri	Hampton
Touko Tainamo	25	F	6'9"	220	SR	Helsinki, Finland	Denver

=== 2024 recruiting class ===
College recruiting information
Name	Hometown	School	Height	Weight	Commit date
Garrett Spielman; G/F	Sheridan, WY	Sheridan HS	6 ft 7 in (2.01 m)	192 lb (87 kg)	May 24, 2024
Garrett Spielman; G/F	Recruit ratings: Scout: Rivals: 247Sports: ESPN: (N/A)				
Jehvion Starwood; G	Oswego, IL	Oswego East HS	6 ft 3 in (1.91 m)	180 lb (82 kg)	Nov 9, 2023
Jehvion Starwood; G	Recruit ratings: Scout: Rivals: 247Sports: ESPN: (N/A)				
Overall recruit ranking:
Note: In many cases, Scout, Rivals, 247Sports, On3, and ESPN may conflict in their listings of height and weight.; In these cases, the average was taken. ESPN grades are on a 100-point scale.; Sources: "204 Wyoming Basketball Commitments". Rivals.; "2024 Team Ranking". Rivals.

== Preseason ==
Mountain West Preseason Poll

	Mountain West Preseason	
1.	Boise State	276 (19)
2.	New Mexico	233 (1)
3.	Nevada	219 (1)
4.	San Diego State	213 (2)
5.	UNLV	178 (2)
6.	Utah State	169 (1)
7.	Colorado State	160
8.	San Jose State	88
9.	Wyoming	67
10.	Fresno State	62
11.	Air Force	51
Reference: (#) first-place votes

Pre-Season All-Mountain West Team

Player	School
Alvaro Cardenas	Boise State
Nique Clifford	Colorado State
Nick Davidson	Nevada
Tyson Degenhart	Boise State
Donovan Dent	New Mexico
Nelly Junior Joseph	New Mexico
Ian Martinez	Utah State
O'Mar Stanley	Boise State
Dedan Thomas Jr.	UNLV
Reese Waters	San Diego State

- Player of the Year: Tyson Degenhart, Boise State
- Newcomer of the Year: Kobe Sanders, Nevada
- Freshman of the Year: Pharaoh Compton, San Diego State

== Roster ==
2024–25 Wyoming Cowboys men's basketball team
Players
Coaches

Pos.	#	Name	Height	Weight	Year	Previous school	Hometown
G	1	Nigle Cook	6 ft 6 in (1.98 m)	176 lb (80 kg)	RS Fr	DME Academy	DeLand, FL
G	2	Kobe Newton	6 ft 2 in (1.88 m)	178 lb (81 kg)	Sr	Fullerton College	Portland, OR
G	3	A.J. Wills	6 ft 2 in (1.88 m)	160 lb (73 kg)	So	Holy Cross	Richmond, VA
G	5	Obi Agbim	6 ft 3 in (1.91 m)	180 lb (82 kg)	Sr	Fort Lewis College	Aurora, CO
F	7	Matija Belic	6 ft 7 in (2.01 m)	205 lb (93 kg)	Jr	UC Santa Barbara	Belgrade, SRB
F	8	Cole Henry	6 ft 9 in (2.06 m)	240 lb (109 kg)	Sr	Northern Iowa	Oskaloosa, IA
F	9	Abou Magassa	6 ft 7 in (2.01 m)	215 lb (98 kg)	RS Fr	Saint Louis	Morsang-sur-Orge, FRA
G	10	Levi Brown (W)	6 ft 0 in (1.83 m)	167 lb (76 kg)	RS Fr	Laramie HS	Laramie, WY
G	11	Dontaie Allen	6 ft 6 in (1.98 m)	210 lb (95 kg)	Sr	Western Kentucky	Falmouth, KY
C	12	Scottie Ebube	6 ft 10 in (2.08 m)	275 lb (125 kg)	Jr	Southern Illinois	Mundelein, IL
G/F	14	Garrett Spielman (W)	6 ft 7 in (2.01 m)	192 lb (87 kg)	Fr	Sheridan HS	Sheridan, WY
F	15	Oleg Kojenets	7 ft 0 in (2.13 m)	228 lb (103 kg)	Jr	Nebraska	Kaunas, Lithuania
G	16	Jordan Nesbitt	6 ft 6 in (1.98 m)	210 lb (95 kg)	Sr	Hampton	St. Louis, MO
G	22	Jehvion Starwood	6 ft 3 in (1.91 m)	180 lb (82 kg)	Fr	Oswego East HS	Oswego, IL
F	25	Touko Tainamo	6 ft 9 in (2.06 m)	220 lb (100 kg)	Sr	Denver	Helsinki, FIN
G	31	Cort Roberson (W)	6 ft 0 in (1.83 m)	160 lb (73 kg)	Jr	Stanwood HS	Arlington, WA

Head coach

- Sundance Wicks (Northern State)

Assistant coach(es)

- Pat Monaghan (Lewis)
- Nic Reynolds (Columbia College)
- Nick Whitmore (Boise State)
- Shaun Vandiver (Colorado)

Legend

- (C) Team captain
- (S) Suspended
- (I) Ineligible
- (W) Walk-on
- Injured
- Current redshirt

Roster

== Schedule and results ==
Date time, TV	Rank^{#}	Opponent^{#}	Result	Record	High points	High rebounds	High assists	Site (attendance) city, state
Exhibition
October 25, 2024*; 6:30 pm		College of Idaho	W 80–63	—	18 – Tainamo	9 – Magassa	4 – Henry	Arena-Auditorium (2,029); Laramie, WY
Regular season
November 4, 2024*; 7:30 pm		Concordia St. Paul	W 108–85	1–0	25 – Agbim	16 – Nesbitt	6 – Agbim	Arena-Auditorium (4,281); Laramie, WY
November 10, 2024*; 2:00 pm		Tennessee State	W 81–66	2–0	24 – Agbim	7 – Nesbitt	5 – Newton	Arena-Auditorium (4,339); Laramie, WY
November 13, 2024*; 6:00 pm, ESPN+		at Texas Tech	L 49–96	2–1	15 – Agbim	6 – Henry	2 – Tied	United Supermarkets Arena (11,456); Lubbock, TX
November 16, 2024*; 7:00 pm		Utah Tech	W 86–69	3–1	19 – Newton	12 – Nesbitt	4 – Newton	Arena-Auditorium (3,596); Laramie, WY
November 22, 2024*; 6:30 pm		Southeastern Louisiana	W 64–61	4–1	13 – Nesbitt	15 – Nesbitt	2 – Tainamo	Arena-Auditorium (3,761); Laramie, WY
November 26, 2024*; 4:00 pm, CBSSN		vs. Tulane; Cancún Challenge Riviera Semifinals	W 64–63	5–1	18 – Agbim	13 – Nesbitt	3 – Nesbitt	Hard Rock Hotel Riviera Maya (374); Cancún, Mexico
November 27, 2024*; 6:30 pm, CBSSN		vs. Loyola Marymount; Cancún Challenge Riviera Championship	L 70–73	5–2	23 – Agbim	10 – Nesbitt	5 – Agbim	Hard Rock Hotel Riviera Maya (853); Cancún, Mexico
December 4, 2024; 7:00 pm		at Utah State	L 67–70	5–3 (0–1)	17 – Tied	9 – Nesbitt	10 – Agbim	Smith Spectrum (8,420); Logan, UT
December 10, 2024*; 6:00 pm		at South Dakota	L 81–82	5–4	17 – Agbim	6 – Tied	4 – Agbim	Sanford Coyote Sports Center (1,838); Vermillion, SD
December 14, 2024*; 7:00 pm, ESPN+		vs. BYU	L 49–68	5–5	21 – Agbim	9 – Magassa	2 – Tied	Delta Center (11,217); Salt Lake City, UT
December 19, 2024*; 6:30 pm		Bellarmine	W 92–55	6–5	28 – Agbim	9 – Magassa	7 – Wills	Arena-Auditorium (2,271); Laramie, WY
December 22, 2024*; 3:00 pm		at Cal State Fullerton	W 73–69	7–5	20 – Newton	6 – Tied	3 – Tainamo	Titan Gym (468); Fullerton, CA
December 28, 2024; 2:00 pm		Nevada	W 66–63	8–5 (1–1)	18 – Agbim	5 – Allen	4 – Tied	Arena-Auditorium (4,352); Laramie, WY
December 31, 2024; 6:30 pm		Boise State	L 58–67	8–6 (1–2)	17 – Wills	6 – Belic	2 – Henry	Arena-Auditorium (3,823); Laramie, WY
January 4, 2025; 3:00 pm		at Air Force	W 70–65	9–6 (2–2)	16 – Newton	10 – Nesbitt	5 – Wills	Clune Arena (2,482); U.S. Air Force Academy, CO
January 7, 2025; 8:00 pm, CBSSN		New Mexico	L 53–61	9–7 (2–3)	11 – Allen	8 – Nesbitt	5 – Nesbitt	Arena-Auditorium (2,938); Laramie, WY
January 14, 2025; 7:00 pm		at Boise State	L 55–96	9–8 (2–4)	16 – Agbim	4 – Tied	2 – Tied	ExtraMile Arena (10,474); Boise, ID
January 18, 2025; 2:00 pm		Colorado State; Border War	L 63–79	9–9 (2–5)	26 – Agbim	6 – Agbim	2 – Agbim	Arena-Auditorium (4,941); Laramie, WY
January 21, 2025; 9:00 pm, CBSSN		at UNLV	W 63–61	10–9 (3–5)	19 – Agbim	12 – Nesbitt	6 – Nesbitt	Thomas & Mack Center (4,685); Paradise, NV
January 25, 2025; 5:30 pm		at San Jose State	L 58–67	10–10 (3–6)	22 – Ebube	7 – Nesbitt	6 – Agbim	Provident Credit Union Event Center (2,585); San Jose, CA
January 28, 2025; 6:30 pm		Fresno State	W 83–72 ^{OT}	11–10 (4–6)	18 – Newton	10 – Nesbitt	5 – Agbim	Arena-Auditorium (3,955); Laramie, WY
February 1, 2025; 6:00 pm, CBSSN		at San Diego State	L 61–63	11–11 (4–7)	18 – Allen	6 – Tied	6 – Agbim	Viejas Arena (12,414); San Diego, CA
February 4, 2025; 6:30 pm		Utah State	L 67–71	11–12 (4–8)	11 – Nesbitt	7 – Nesbitt	2 – Tied	Arena-Auditorium (3,550); Laramie, WY
February 8, 2025; 2:00 pm		UNLV	L 57–68	11–13 (4–9)	14 – Agbim	6 – Tied	6 – Henry	Arena-Auditorium (3,787); Laramie, WY
February 12, 2025; 8:00 pm, FS1		at New Mexico	L 67–71	11–14 (4–10)	22 – Agbim	11 – Allen	4 – Allen	The Pit (11,852); Albuquerque, NM
February 15, 2025; 2:00 pm		at Colorado State; Border War	L 53–88	11–15 (4–11)	15 – Tied	5 – Tied	2 – Agbim	Moby Arena (8,083); Fort Collins, CO
February 18, 2025; 6:30 pm		Air Force	W 69–62	12–15 (5–11)	22 – Agbim	10 – Nesbitt	4 – Agbim	Arena-Auditorium (3,211); Laramie, WY
February 22, 2025; 2:00 pm		San Jose State	L 73–82	12–16 (5–12)	20 – Agbim	7 – Tied	4 – Tied	Arena-Auditorium (3,924); Laramie, WY
February 25, 2025; 8:00 pm		at Nevada	L 61–84	12–17 (5–13)	16 – Newton	8 – Magassa	6 – Agbim	Lawlor Events Center (7,563); Reno, NV
March 1, 2025; 6:00 pm, CBSSN		San Diego State	L 69–72	12–18 (5–14)	21 – Agbim	6 – Tied	2 – Tied	Arena-Auditorium (3,951); Laramie, WY
March 4, 2025; 6:00 pm, MW Network		at Fresno State	L 58–62	12–19 (5–15)	17 – Agbim	8 – Tainamo	5 – Agbim	Save Mart Center (3,941); Fresno, CA
Mountain West tournament
March 12, 2024; 12:00 p.m., MW Network	(9)	vs. (8) San Jose State; First round	L 61–66	12–20	16 – Nesbitt	9 – Nesbitt	3 – Wills	Thomas & Mack Center; Paradise, NV
*Non-conference game. ^{#}Rankings from AP poll. (#) Tournament seedings in parentheses. All times are in Mountain.
