= Mountain West Conference men's basketball tournament =

American collegiate postseason tournament

- Conference basketball championship
- Sport: College basketball
- Conference: Mountain West Conference
- Number of teams: 12
- Format: Single-elimination tournament
- Current stadium: Thomas & Mack Center
- Current location: Paradise, Nevada
- Played: 2000–present
- Last contest: 2025
- Current champion: Colorado State (2)
- Most championships: San Diego State (7)
- TV partner(s): CBS Sports Network, CBS
- Official website: TheMWC.CSTV.com Men's Basketball

Host stadiums
- Thomas & Mack Center (2000-2003) Pepsi Center (2004-2006) Thomas & Mack Center (2007-present)

Host locations
- Denver, Colorado (2004-06); Paradise, Nevada (2000-2003, 2007-present)

The Mountain West Conference men's basketball tournament is held annually to determine the men's basketball champion from the Mountain West Conference. The winner receives an automatic bid to the NCAA Division I Basketball tournament, although they did not in the 1998-1999 season, the conference's first year in existence. The Thomas & Mack Center in Paradise, Nevada has hosted the most tournaments (15), including the last 11 consecutive tournaments.

San Diego State have won the tournament seven times, the most of any team. The No. 2 seed has won the tournament eight times, the most of any seed. The lowest seed to win the tournament was Colorado State as a No. 6 seed in 2003. New Mexico also won as a No. 6 seed, becoming the first team to play all four rounds and win in 2024.

== Results ==
Year	Champion	Score	Runner-up	Tournament MVP	Location
2000	UNLV	79–56	BYU	Mark Dickel, UNLV	Thomas & Mack Center, Paradise, Nevada
2001	BYU	69–65	New Mexico	Mekeli Wesley, BYU	Thomas & Mack Center, Paradise, Nevada
2002	San Diego State	78–75	UNLV	Randy Holcomb, San Diego State	Thomas & Mack Center, Paradise, Nevada
2003	Colorado State	62–61	UNLV	Matt Nelson, Colorado State	Thomas & Mack Center, Paradise, Nevada
2004	Utah	73–70	UNLV	Nick Jacobson, Utah	Pepsi Center, Denver, Colorado
2005	New Mexico	60–56	Utah	Danny Granger, New Mexico	Pepsi Center, Denver, Colorado
2006	San Diego State	69–64	Wyoming	Marcus Slaughter, San Diego State	Pepsi Center, Denver, Colorado
2007	UNLV	78–70	BYU	Kevin Kruger, UNLV	Thomas & Mack Center, Paradise, Nevada
2008	UNLV	76–61	BYU	Wink Adams, UNLV	Thomas & Mack Center, Paradise, Nevada
2009	Utah	52–50	San Diego State	Luke Nevill, Utah	Thomas & Mack Center, Paradise, Nevada
2010	San Diego State	55–45	UNLV	Kawhi Leonard, San Diego State	Thomas & Mack Center, Paradise, Nevada
2011	San Diego State	72–54	BYU	Jimmer Fredette, BYU	Thomas & Mack Center, Paradise, Nevada
2012	New Mexico	68–59	San Diego State	Drew Gordon, New Mexico	Thomas & Mack Center, Paradise, Nevada
2013	New Mexico	63–56	UNLV	Tony Snell, New Mexico	Thomas & Mack Center, Paradise, Nevada
2014	New Mexico	64–58	San Diego State	Cameron Bairstow, New Mexico	Thomas & Mack Center, Paradise, Nevada
2015	Wyoming	45–43	San Diego State	Josh Adams, Wyoming	Thomas & Mack Center, Paradise, Nevada
2016	Fresno State	68–63	San Diego State	Marvelle Harris, Fresno State	Thomas & Mack Center, Paradise, Nevada
2017	Nevada	79–71	Colorado State	Jordan Caroline, Nevada	Thomas & Mack Center, Paradise, Nevada
2018	San Diego State	82–75	New Mexico	Trey Kell, San Diego State	Thomas & Mack Center, Paradise, Nevada
2019	Utah State	64–57	San Diego State	Sam Merrill, Utah State	Thomas & Mack Center, Paradise, Nevada
2020	Utah State	59–56	San Diego State	Sam Merrill, Utah State	Thomas & Mack Center, Paradise, Nevada
2021	San Diego State	68–57	Utah State	Matt Mitchell, San Diego State	Thomas & Mack Center, Paradise, Nevada
2022	Boise State	53–52	San Diego State	Abu Kigab, Boise State	Thomas & Mack Center, Paradise, Nevada
2023	San Diego State	62–57	Utah State	Matt Bradley, San Diego State	Thomas & Mack Center, Paradise, Nevada
2024	New Mexico	68–61	San Diego State	Jaelen House, New Mexico	Thomas & Mack Center, Paradise, Nevada
2025	Colorado State	69–56	Boise State	Nique Clifford, Colorado State	Thomas & Mack Center, Paradise, Nevada
2026	Utah State	73–62	San Diego State	MJ Collins Jr., Utah State	Thomas & Mack Center, Paradise, Nevada

== All-time tournament record by team ==
Updated through the 2023 Tournament:

School	W	L	Pct.	Championships	Final appearances	Championship Years	Championship Appearances
Utah State ^	11	5	.688	3	5	2019, 2020, 2026	2019, 2020, 2021, 2023, 2026
San Diego State ^	34	16	.680	7	17	2002, 2006, 2010, 2011, 2018, 2021, 2023	2002, 2006, 2009, 2010, 2011, 2012, 2014, 2015, 2016, 2018, 2019, 2020, 2021, 2022, 2023, 2024, 2026
UNLV	27	17	.614	3	8	2000, 2007, 2008	2000, 2002, 2003, 2004, 2007, 2008, 2010, 2013
Utah ^	13	10	.565	2	3	2004, 2009	2004, 2005, 2009
BYU ^	14	11	.560	1	5	2001	2000, 2001, 2007, 2008, 2011
New Mexico	20	17	.541	5	7	2005, 2012, 2013, 2014, 2024	2001, 2005, 2012, 2013, 2014, 2018, 2024
Fresno State ^	6	7	.462	1	1	2016	2016
Nevada	6	7	.462	1	1	2017	2017
Colorado State ^	14	20	.412	2	3	2003, 2025	2003, 2017, 2025
Wyoming	14	20	.412	1	2	2015	2006, 2015
Boise State ^	11	13	.458	1	2	2022	2022, 2025
TCU ^	2	7	.222	0	0		
Air Force	6	21	.222	0	0		
San Jose State	1	7	.125	0	0		

^ No longer a Mountain West member as of the upcoming 2026–27 season.

== See also ==
- Mountain West Conference women's basketball tournament
