= Niko Medved =

American college basketball coach (born 1973)

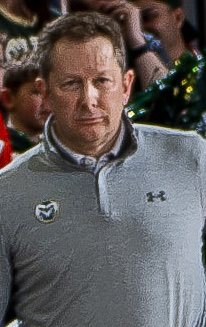
- Medved in 2024.

Current position
- Title: Head coach
- Team: Minnesota
- Conference: Big Ten
- Record: 21–18 (.538)

Biographical details
- Born: August 10, 1973 (age 53); Minneapolis, Minnesota, U.S.
- Education: Minnesota (1997)

Coaching career (HC unless noted)
- 1997–1999: Macalester (associate HC)
- 1999–2006: Furman (assistant)
- 2006–2007: Minnesota (assistant)
- 2007–2013: Colorado State (assistant)
- 2013–2017: Furman
- 2017–2018: Drake
- 2018–2025: Colorado State
- 2025–present: Minnesota

Head coaching record
- Overall: 243–191 (.560)
- Tournaments: 2–4 (NCAA Division I); 2–2 (NIT); 4–2 (CIT); 0–1 (CBC)

Accomplishments and honors

Championships
- SoCon regular season (2017); MWC tournament (2025)

Awards
- Skip Prosser Man of the Year Award (2024); SoCon Coach of the Year (2017)

Niko Medved (born August 10, 1973) is an American college basketball coach, currently the head men's basketball coach at the University of Minnesota. Prior to becoming head coach at Minnesota, he was head coach at Colorado State, Drake, and Furman.

== Early life and education ==
Born in Minneapolis, Medved graduated from Roseville Area High School in nearby Roseville, Minnesota in 1992. In high school, Medved was a letterwinner in basketball and golf. He is a 1997 graduate of the University of Minnesota.

== Assistant coach ==
Medved was an assistant coach at Furman from 1999 to 2006. He spent a year as assistant at his alma mater, Minnesota, under Dan Monson (who resigned mid-season) and Jim Molinari.

Medved then enjoyed success as an assistant coach at Colorado State under Tim Miles. He helped guide the Rams to four straight postseason appearances, including back-to-back trips to the 2012 and 2013 NCAA tournament. He helped Colorado State achieve records of 19–13 and 20–12.

== Furman ==
On April 12, 2013 Medved was announced as the head coach for Furman University for the 2013–14 season. Medved took over a struggling Furman program, taking over a seven-win team in 2013 and progressing to nine, 11, 19, and 23 wins in successive seasons. Medved has also coached back-to-back Southern Conference Players of the Year in Stephen Croone and Devin Sibley, Jr. In his third season at Furman in 2015–16, the Paladins finished with a 19–16 overall record, a third-place finish in the Southern Conference, and the school's first postseason victory in 40 years. He led the Paladins to the second round of the CollegeInsider.com Tournament (CIT).

In January 2017, Medved signed a contract extension with Furman through 2022.

In 2017, Medved was named SoCon Coach of the Year as he led the Paladins to the SoCon regular-season championship with a 13–3 conference record. Losing in the SoCon tournament led to another appearance in the CIT.

== Drake ==
On March 26, 2017, Medved was hired as head coach at Drake. After a 17-17 season and the school’s first postseason tournament appearance in six years, Medved left Drake to become the head coach at Colorado State University.

== Return to Colorado State ==
After one season at Drake, Medved was named head coach of Colorado State on March 22, 2018. He named Dave Thorson, JR Blount and Ali Farokhmanesh as his assistants.

In 2022, Medved led the Rams to their first NCAA tournament appearance since 2013.

In 2024, Medved led the Rams back to the NCAA tournament. They would beat Virginia 67-42 in their First Four game in Dayton before falling to Texas 44-56 in the Round of 64.

On March 15, 2025, Medved and Colorado State won the 2025 Mountain West Conference men's basketball tournament.

== University of Minnesota ==
On March 24, 2025, Medved agreed to become the next coach of the Minnesota Golden Gophers men's basketball team.

== Head coaching record ==
Record table
Season	Team	Overall	Conference	Standing	Postseason
Furman Paladins (Southern Conference) (2013–2017)
2013–14	Furman	9–21	3–13	10th	
2014–15	Furman	11–22	5–13	10th	
2015–16	Furman	19–16	11–7	T–3rd	CIT second round
2016–17	Furman	23–12	14–4	T–1st	CIT semifinal (Note: Medved left for Drake after Furman reached the semifinals; interim coach Bob Richey coached the semifinal against Saint Peter's.)
Furman:		62–71 (.466)	33–37 (.471)		
Drake Bulldogs (Missouri Valley Conference) (2017–2018)
2017–18	Drake	17–17	10–8	T–3rd	CIT second round
Drake:		17–17 (.500)	10–8 (.556)		
Colorado State Rams (Mountain West Conference) (2018–2025)
2018–19	Colorado State	12–20	7–11	T–7th	
2019–20	Colorado State	20–12	11–7	T–5th	
2020–21	Colorado State	20–8	14–4	3rd	NIT Fourth Place
2021–22	Colorado State	25–6	14–4	2nd	NCAA Division I Round of 64
2022–23	Colorado State	15–18	6–12	T–8th	
2023–24	Colorado State	25–11	10–8	T–6th	NCAA Division I Round of 64
2024–25	Colorado State	26–10	16–4	2nd	NCAA Division I Round of 32
Colorado State:		143–85 (.627)	78–50 (.609)		
Minnesota Golden Gophers (Big Ten Conference) (2025–present)
2025–26	Minnesota	15–18	8–12	11th	CBC Quarterfinals
2026–27	Minnesota	6–0	0–0		
Minnesota:		21–18 (.538)	8–12 (.400)		
Total:		243–191 (.560)			
National champion Postseason invitational champion Conference regular season champion Conference regular season and conference tournament champion Division regular season champion Division regular season and conference tournament champion Conference tournament champion
