= 2024–25 Fresno State Bulldogs men's basketball team =

American college basketball season

2024–25 Fresno State Bulldogs men's basketball
- Conference: Mountain West Conference
- Record: 6–26 (2–18 MW)
- Head coach: Vance Walberg (1st season)
- Assistant coaches: John Welch; Ray Barefield; Jaren Harris
- Home arena: Save Mart Center (Capacity: 15,596)

2024–25 Mountain West Conference men's basketball standings
	Conf.				Overall
Team	W		L	PCT	W		L	PCT
New Mexico	17	–	3	.850	27	–	8	.771
Colorado State †	16	–	4	.800	26	–	10	.722
Utah State	15	–	5	.750	26	–	8	.765
San Diego State	14	–	6	.700	21	–	10	.677
Boise State	14	–	6	.700	26	–	11	.703
UNLV	11	–	9	.550	18	–	15	.545
Nevada	8	–	12	.400	17	–	16	.515
San Jose State	7	–	13	.350	15	–	20	.429
Wyoming	5	–	15	.250	12	–	20	.375
Fresno State	2	–	18	.100	6	–	26	.188
Air Force	1	–	19	.050	4	–	28	.125
† 2025 Mountain West tournament winner

The 2024–25 Fresno State Bulldogs men's basketball team represented California State University, Fresno during the 2024–25 NCAA Division I men's basketball season. The Bulldogs, led by first-year head coach Vance Walberg, played their games at Save Mart Center as members of the Mountain West Conference.

== Previous season ==
The Bulldogs finished the season 12–21, 4–14 in conference play to finish in ninth place. They defeated Wyoming in the first round of the MWC tournament before falling to the top-seeded Utah State in the quarterfinals. After the conclusion of their season, head coach Justin Hutson was fired after six seasons with the program. On Saturday, April 6th, the University announced it had hired Vance Walberg as its next head coach.

== Offseason ==
=== Departures ===
Name	Number	Pos.	Height	Weight	Year	Hometown	Reason for departure
Eduardo Andre	0	C	6'10"	220	Senior	London, England	Transferred to West Virginia
Enoch Boakye	5	C	6'11"	250	Junior	Brampton, ON, Canada	Transferred to Villanova
Leo Colimerio	13	SF	6'7"	180	Senior	São Paulo, Brazil	Entered transfer portal
Xavier DuSell	1	SG	6'4"	200	Senior	Scottsdale, AZ	Transferred to Nevada
Isaiah Hill	3	PG	6'0"	170	Graduate	Bakersfield, CA	Out of eligibility
Isaiah Pope	21	SG	6'5"	200	Senior	Yorba Linda, CA	Graduated
Isaac Taveras	2	SG	6'4"	175	Freshman	Santo Domingo, Dominican Republic	Entered transfer portal
Zaylon Thomas	14	G	6'5"	185	Senior	Sacramento, CA	(Walk-on) Graduated
Donovan Yap	21	PG	6'5"	182	Senior	Las Vegas, NV	Transferred to San Jose State

=== Incoming transfers ===
Name	Number	Pos.	Height	Weight	Year	Hometown	Previous college
David Douglas Jr.	15	SG	6'5"	195	Sophomore	Park Forest, IL	Green Bay
Elijah Price	3	PF	6'9"	195	RS Freshman	Long Beach, CA	Drake
Mor Seck	23	C	7'1"	225	Senior	Ngayene Daour, Senegal	Hawaii

=== 2024 recruiting class ===
College recruiting
Name	Hometown	School	Height	Weight	Commit date
Brian Amuneke; SG	Los Angeles, CA		6 ft 4 in (1.93 m)	180 lb (82 kg)	Oct 1, 2024
Brian Amuneke; SG	Recruit ratings: Scout: Rivals: 247Sports: ESPN: (NR)				
Alex Crawford; SF	Chula Vista, CA	Coronado HS (CA)	6 ft 8 in (2.03 m)	215 lb (98 kg)	Apr 22, 2024
Alex Crawford; SF	Recruit ratings: Scout: Rivals: 247Sports: ESPN: (NR)				
Makhan Diouf; PF	Dakar, Senegal	Bella Vista Prep	6 ft 11 in (2.11 m)	215 lb (98 kg)	Jun 29, 2024
Makhan Diouf; PF	Recruit ratings: Scout: Rivals: 247Sports: ESPN: (NR)				
Rippen Gill; PG	Bakersfield, CA	Centennial HS	6 ft 7 in (2.01 m)	295 lb (134 kg)	Aug 18, 2024
Rippen Gill; PG	Recruit ratings: Scout: Rivals: 247Sports: ESPN: (NR)				
Troy Jenkins; SG	Newport Beach, CA	Crean Lutheran	6 ft 4 in (1.93 m)	180 lb (82 kg)	Oct 1, 2024
Troy Jenkins; SG	Recruit ratings: Scout: Rivals: 247Sports: ESPN: (NR)				
Overall recruit ranking: Scout: – Rivals: –
Note: In many cases, Scout, Rivals, 247Sports, On3, and ESPN may conflict in their listings of height and weight.; In these cases, the average was taken. ESPN grades are on a 100-point scale.; Sources: "2024 Fresno State Basketball Recruiting Commits". Scout.; "Scout.com Team Recruiting Rankings". Scout.; "2024 Team Ranking". Rivals.

== Roster ==
2024–25 Fresno State Bulldogs men's basketball team
Players
Coaches

Pos.	#	Name	Height	Weight	Year	Previous school	Hometown
G	0	Jasir Tremble	5 ft 10 in (1.78 m)	155 lb (70 kg)	Jr	Theodore Roosevelt HS (D.C.); Prince George's CC	Washington, District of Columbia
G	1	Amar Augillard	6 ft 5 in (1.96 m)	220 lb (100 kg)	Jr	Zion-Benton HS; Georgia Southern	Zion, Illinois
F	3	Elijah Price	6 ft 9 in (2.06 m)	205 lb (93 kg)	RS Fr	St. Anthony HS (CA); Drake	Long Beach, California
F	4	Troy Jenkins	6 ft 4 in (1.93 m)	180 lb (82 kg)	Fr	Crean Lutheran HS	Newport Beach, California
G	5	Jalen Weaver	6 ft 4 in (1.93 m)	200 lb (91 kg)	Sr	Smoky Hill HS; Salt Lake CC	Aurora, Colorado
G	6	Joshua Bonga	6 ft 4 in (1.93 m)	190 lb (86 kg)	RS Fr	SC Rasta Vechta	Koblenz, Germany
F	7	Pierre Geneste Jr.	6 ft 11 in (2.11 m)	230 lb (104 kg)	Jr	Heritage Christian HS; Louisiana Tech	Port-au-Prince, Haiti
F	8	Alex Crawford	6 ft 8 in (2.03 m)	215 lb (98 kg)	Jr	Coronado HS (CA); Stetson	Chula Vista, California
F	9	Pasha Shemirani	6 ft 5 in (1.96 m)	193 lb (88 kg)	RS Fr	Sunrise Christian Academy	Los Angeles, California
G	10	Zaon Collins	6 ft 1 in (1.85 m)	170 lb (77 kg)	So	Bishop Gorman HS; Salt Lake CC	Las Vegas, Nevada
F	11	Mykell Robinson	6 ft 7 in (2.01 m)	205 lb (93 kg)	RS Jr	Sunrise Christian Academy; North Texas	Houston, Texas
G	13	Rippen Gill	6 ft 7 in (2.01 m)	195 lb (88 kg)	Fr	Centennial HS	Bakersfield, California
G	15	David Douglas Jr.	6 ft 5 in (1.96 m)	195 lb (88 kg)	So	Yorkville Christian HS; Green Bay	Park Forest, Illinois
F	20	Makhan Diouf	6 ft 11 in (2.11 m)	215 lb (98 kg)	Fr	Bella Vista Prep	Dakar, Senegal
G	21	Brian Amuneke	6 ft 4 in (1.93 m)	180 lb (82 kg)	Fr	Rancho Christian School	Los Angeles, California
C	23	Mor Seck	7 ft 1 in (2.16 m)	225 lb (102 kg)	Sr	Prolific Prep; Hawaii	Ngayene Daour, Senegal

Head coach

- Vance Walberg (Cal State Bakersfield)

Assistant coach(es)

- John Welch (UNLV)
- Ray Barefield (San Diego State)
- Jaren Harris (Albany State)

Legend

- (C) Team captain
- (S) Suspended
- (I) Ineligible
- (W) Walk-on
- Injured
- Current redshirt

Roster

== Schedule and results ==
Date time, TV	Rank^{#}	Opponent^{#}	Result	Record	High points	High rebounds	High assists	Site (attendance) city, state
Regular season
November 8, 2024*; 7:00 p.m., MW Network		Sacramento State	W 64–57	1–0	30 – Augillard	9 – Weaver	4 – Collins	Save Mart Center (5,657); Fresno, CA
November 13, 2024*; 7:00 p.m., ESPN+		at UC Santa Barbara	L 86–91	1–1	21 – Augillard	7 – Crawford	4 – Collins	The Thunderdome (2,872); Santa Barbara, CA
November 16, 2024*; 6:30 p.m., ESPN+		at Cal State Bakersfield	L 58–74	1–2	12 – Collins	7 – Price	2 – Tied	Icardo Center (2,057); Bakersfield, CA
November 20, 2024*; 7:00 p.m., MW Network		Prairie View A&M; Acrisure Holiday Invitational campus game	W 94–83	2–2	18 – Seck	13 – Price	8 – Robinson	Save Mart Center (4,615); Fresno, CA
November 23, 2024*; 2:00 p.m., ESPN+		at Long Beach State	W 72–69	3–2	25 – Augillard	10 – Seck	5 – Robinson	Walter Pyramid (1,805); Long Beach, CA
November 26, 2024*; 9:00 p.m., TruTV		vs. Washington State; Acrisure Holiday Invitational Semifinal	L 73–84	3–3	27 – Collins	9 – Price	4 – Tied	Acrisure Arena (550); Thousand Palms, CA
November 27, 2024*; 9:00 p.m., TruTV		vs. Cal Baptist; Acrisure Holiday Invitational 3rd place game	L 81–86 ^{2OT}	3–4	26 – Augillard	15 – Price	4 – Collins	Acrisure Arena (200); Thousand Palms, CA
December 4, 2024; 7:30 p.m., FS1		No. 24 San Diego State	L 62–84	3–5 (0–1)	20 – Robinson	10 – Robinson	2 – Crawford	Save Mart Center (5,610); Fresno, CA
December 7, 2024*; 4:00 p.m., ESPN+		at Santa Clara	L 66–81	3–6	17 – Collins	7 – Robinson	6 – Collins	Leavey Center (1,513); Santa Clara, CA
December 11, 2024*; 6:00 p.m., ESPN+		at BYU	L 67–95	3–7	15 – Weaver	7 – Tied	7 – Tied	Marriott Center (15,950); Provo, UT
December 14, 2024*; 4:00 p.m., MW Network		San Diego	W 73–65	4–7	19 – Weaver	10 – Price	4 – Robinson	Save Mart Center (4,325); Fresno, CA
December 21, 2024*; 2:00 p.m., MW Network		Cal Baptist	L 69–86	4–8	14 – Collins	9 – Robinson	6 – Collins	Save Mart Center (5,263); Fresno, CA
December 28, 2024; 7:00 p.m., MW Network		at UNLV	L 77–87	4–9 (0–2)	19 – Tremble	8 – Robinson	7 – Tied	Thomas & Mack Center (5,590); Paradise, NV
December 31, 2024; 5:00 p.m., MW Network		New Mexico	L 89–103	4–10 (0–3)	20 – Collins	11 – Price	2 – Tied	Save Mart Center (5,583); Fresno, CA
January 4, 2025; 6:00 p.m., MW Network		at Utah State	L 83–89	4–11 (0–4)	26 – Crawford	9 – Weaver	7 – Collins	Smith Spectrum (9,356); Logan, UT
January 7, 2025; 6:00 p.m., MW Network		at Colorado State	L 64–91	4–12 (0–5)	21 – Crawford	9 – Price	4 – Collins	Moby Arena (3,095); Fort Collins, CO
January 11, 2025; 4:00 p.m., MW Network		Nevada	L 66–77 ^{OT}	4–13 (0–6)	16 – Douglas Jr.	7 – Price	4 – Tied	Save Mart Center (5,231); Fresno, CA
January 17, 2025; 7:00 p.m., MW Network		Air Force	W 74–65	5–13 (1–6)	23 – Collins	8 – Price	3 – Tied	Save Mart Center (4,797); Fresno, CA
January 20, 2025; 2:00 p.m., CBSSN		at New Mexico	L 67–95	5–14 (1–7)	18 – Amuneke	11 – Price	9 – Collins	The Pit (13,111); Albuquerque, NM
January 25, 2025; 4:00 p.m., MW Network		Colorado State	L 64–69	5–15 (1–8)	20 – Crawford	7 – Crawford	3 – Tied	Save Mart Center (5,223); Fresno, CA
January 28, 2025; 5:30 p.m., MW Network		at Wyoming	L 72–83 ^{OT}	5–16 (1–9)	23 – Weaver	12 – Price	7 – Collins	Arena-Auditorium (3,955); Laramie, WY
February 1, 2025; 1:00 p.m., MW Network		at Boise State	L 60–82	5–17 (1–10)	16 – Amuneke	8 – Seck	4 – Crawford	ExtraMile Arena (10,853); Boise, ID
February 4, 2025; 7:00 p.m., MW Network		San Jose State	L 91–94 ^{2OT}	5–18 (1–11)	23 – Weaver	8 – Collins	6 – Collins	Save Mart Center (4,257); Fresno, CA
February 7, 2025; 7:00 p.m., MW Network		Utah State	L 81–89	5–19 (1–12)	20 – Weaver	6 – Weaver	4 – Collins	Save Mart Center (4,801); Fresno, CA
February 10, 2025; 8:00 p.m., FS1		at Nevada	L 69–94	5–20 (1–13)	19 – Tremble	9 – Price	9 – Collins	Lawlor Events Center (7,146); Reno, NV
February 15, 2025; 4:00 p.m., MW Network		UNLV	L 51–52	5–21 (1–14)	15 – Price	12 – Price	7 – Collins	Save Mart Center (5,289); Fresno, CA
February 18, 2025; 8:00 p.m., CBSSN		at San Diego State	L 60–83	5–22 (1–15)	16 – Weaver	6 – Collins	4 – Collins	Viejas Arena (12,414); San Diego, CA
February 22, 2025; 1:00 p.m., MW Network		at Air Force	L 69–72 ^{OT}	5–23 (1–16)	18 – Amuneke	11 – Tied	4 – Price	Clune Arena (2,276); Colorado Springs, CO
March 1, 2025; 4:00 p.m., MW Network		Boise State	L 61–66	5–24 (1–17)	19 – Tremble	11 – Price	2 – Collins	Save Mart Center; Fresno, CA
March 4, 2025; 7:00 p.m., MW Network		Wyoming	W 62–58	6–24 (2–17)	16 – Price	13 – Price	4 – Collins	Save Mart Center (3,941); Fresno, CA
March 8, 2025; 2:00 p.m., MW Network		San Jose State	L 68–92	6–25 (2–18)	22 – Tremble	10 – Price	2 – Tied	Provident Credit Union Event Center (2,793); San Jose, CA
Mountain West tournament
March 12, 2025; 1:30 p.m., MW Network	(10)	vs. (7) Nevada; First Round	L 71−86	6–26	17 – Price	11 – Price	8 – Collins	Thomas & Mack Center (–); Paradise, NV
*Non-conference game. ^{#}Rankings from AP Poll. (#) Tournament seedings in parentheses. All times are in Pacific Time.
