= 2024–25 UNLV Runnin' Rebels basketball team =

American college basketball season

2024–25 UNLV Runnin' Rebels basketball
- Conference: Mountain West Conference
- Record: 18–15 (11–9 MW)
- Head coach: Kevin Kruger (4th season)
- Assistant coaches: Barret Peery; John Cooper; Jamaal Williams
- Home arena: Thomas & Mack Center

2024–25 Mountain West Conference men's basketball standings
	Conf.				Overall
Team	W		L	PCT	W		L	PCT
New Mexico	17	–	3	.850	27	–	8	.771
Colorado State †	16	–	4	.800	26	–	10	.722
Utah State	15	–	5	.750	26	–	8	.765
San Diego State	14	–	6	.700	21	–	10	.677
Boise State	14	–	6	.700	26	–	11	.703
UNLV	11	–	9	.550	18	–	15	.545
Nevada	8	–	12	.400	17	–	16	.515
San Jose State	7	–	13	.350	15	–	20	.429
Wyoming	5	–	15	.250	12	–	20	.375
Fresno State	2	–	18	.100	6	–	26	.188
Air Force	1	–	19	.050	4	–	28	.125
† 2025 Mountain West tournament winner

The 2024–25 UNLV Runnin' Rebels basketball team represented the University of Nevada, Las Vegas during the 2024–25 NCAA Division I men's basketball season. The Runnin' Rebels, led by fourth-year head coach Kevin Kruger, played their home games for the 42nd season at the Thomas & Mack Center in Paradise, Nevada. They participated as members of the Mountain West Conference for the 26th season.

== Previous season ==
The Runnin' Rebels finished the 2023–24 season 21–13, 12–6 in Mountain West play to finish in fourth place. In the MWC tournament, they were defeated by San Diego State in the quarterfinals. They received an automatic bid to the NIT in the Seton Hall Bracket where they defeated Princeton in the first round and Boston College in the second round before losing Seton Hall in the quarterfinals.

== Offseason ==
=== Departures ===
Name	Number	Pos.	Height	Weight	Year	Hometown	Reason for departure
Justin Webster	2	G	6'3"	190	GS Senior	Dallas, TX	Graduated
Shane Nowell	3	G	6'6"	220	Junior	Seattle, WA	Transferred to Portland State
Kalib Boone	10	F	6'9"	215	GS Senior	Tulsa, OK	Graduated
Luis Rodriguez	15	G	6'6"	220	GS Senior	Los Angeles, CA	Graduated
Keylan Boone	20	F	6'8"	200	GS Senior	Tulsa, OK	Graduated
Karl Jones	22	F	6'10"	260	Senior	Chicago, IL	Graduated
Jackie Johnson III	24	G	5'11"	185	Junior	Wichita, KS	Transferred to Fordham
Nick Walters	31	G	6'1"	185	Senior	Henderson, NV	Walk-on; graduated

=== Incoming transfers ===
Name	Number	Pos.	Height	Weight	Year	Hometown	Previous college
Jaden Henley	10	G/F	6'7"	200	Junior	Ontario, CA	DePaul
Jailen Bedford	14	G/F	6'4"	181	Senior	Austin, TX	Oral Roberts
Jace Whiting	15	G	6'3"	188	Junior	Burley, ID	Boise State
Julian Rishwain	20	G	6'5"	200	GS Senior	Los Angeles, CA	Florida
Jeremiah Cherry	45	F/C	6'11"		Junior	San Diego, CA	New Mexico JC

=== 2024 recruiting class ===
College recruiting information
Name	Hometown	School	Height	Weight	Commit date
James Evans #28 SF	Santa Clarita, CA	West Ranch High School	6 ft 1 in (1.85 m)	170 lb (77 kg)	Jun 30, 2023
James Evans #28 SF	Recruit ratings: Rivals: 247Sports: ESPN: (81)				
Pape N'Diaye #42 C	Las Vegas, NV	Trinity International School	6 ft 11 in (2.11 m)	215 lb (98 kg)	Oct 2, 2023
Pape N'Diaye #42 C	Recruit ratings: Rivals: 247Sports: ESPN: (79)				
Overall recruit ranking:
Note: In many cases, Scout, Rivals, 247Sports, On3, and ESPN may conflict in their listings of height and weight.; In these cases, the average was taken. ESPN grades are on a 100-point scale.; Sources: "2024 UNLV Basketball Commitments". Rivals.; "2024 Team Ranking". Rivals.

== Roster ==
2024–25 UNLV Runnin' Rebels men's basketball team
Players
Coaches

Pos.	#	Name	Height	Weight	Year	Previous school	Hometown
F	0	Isaiah Cottrell	6 ft 11 in (2.11 m)	245 lb (111 kg)	RS Jr	West Virginia	Las Vegas, NV
F	1	Jalen Hill	6 ft 6 in (1.98 m)	230 lb (104 kg)	GS	Oklahoma	Las Vegas, NV
G	2	James Evans Jr.	6 ft 4 in (1.93 m)	190 lb (86 kg)	Fr	West Ranch HS	Wichita, KS
G	3	Luke Naser (W)	6 ft 0 in (1.83 m)	200 lb (91 kg)	Fr	Liberty HS	Las Vegas, NV
F	5	Rob Whaley Jr.	6 ft 7 in (2.01 m)	260 lb (118 kg)	Sr	College of Southern Idaho	Farmington, UT
G	10	Jaden Henley	6 ft 7 in (2.01 m)	215 lb (98 kg)	Jr	DePaul	Ontario, CA
G	11	Dedan Thomas Jr.	6 ft 1 in (1.85 m)	170 lb (77 kg)	So	Liberty HS	Las Vegas, NV
F	12	Jacob Bannarbie	6 ft 9 in (2.06 m)	230 lb (104 kg)	RS Fr	Hillcrest Prep (AZ)	Anchorage, AK
G	13	Brooklyn Hicks	6 ft 3 in (1.91 m)	185 lb (84 kg)	So	Timberline HS	Seattle, WA
G	14	Jailen Bedford	6 ft 4 in (1.93 m)	180 lb (82 kg)	Sr	Oral Roberts	Austin, TX
G	15	Jace Whiting	6 ft 3 in (1.91 m)	190 lb (86 kg)	Jr	Boise State	Burley, ID
G	20	Julian Rishwain	6 ft 5 in (1.96 m)	200 lb (91 kg)	GS	Florida	Los Angeles, CA
F	22	Pape N'Diaye	7 ft 0 in (2.13 m)	215 lb (98 kg)	Fr	Trinity International School (NV)	Ivory Coast
F	31	Faris Mucharbach (W)	6 ft 9 in (2.06 m)	200 lb (91 kg)	Fr	Bishop Gorman HS	Las Vegas, NV
F	45	Jeremiah Cherry	6 ft 11 in (2.11 m)	280 lb (127 kg)	Jr	New Mexico JC	San Diego, CA

Head coach

- Kevin Kruger (UNLV)

Assistant coach(es)

- Barret Peery (Southern Utah)
- John Cooper (Wichita State)
- Jamaal Williams (Washington)

Legend

- (C) Team captain
- (S) Suspended
- (I) Ineligible
- (W) Walk-on
- Injured
- Current redshirt

Roster

== Schedule and results ==
Date time, TV	Rank^{#}	Opponent^{#}	Result	Record	High points	High rebounds	High assists	Site (attendance) city, state
Non-conference regular season
November 4, 2024*; 8:30 p.m., SSSEN/MW Network		Alabama State	W 93−79	1−0	24 – Cherry	11 – Cherry	7 – Thomas Jr.	Thomas & Mack Center (4,608); Paradise, NV
November 9, 2024*; 3:00 p.m., SSSEN/MW Network		Memphis	L 74–80	1–1	22 – Thomas Jr.	7 – Cherry	5 – Hill	Thomas & Mack Center (6,510); Paradise, NV
November 14, 2024*; 7:00 p.m., SSSEN/MW Network		Omaha	W 80–69	2–1	17 – Tied	8 – Hill	3 – Tied	Thomas & Mack Center (4,817); Paradise, NV
November 20, 2024*; 7:00 p.m., SSSEN/MW Network		Pepperdine	W 80–59	3–1	16 – Hicks	6 – N'Diaye	6 – Thomas	Thomas & Mack Center (4,544); Paradise, NV
November 23, 2024*; 4:00 p.m., SSSEN/MW Network		New Mexico State; Arizona Tip-Off campus site game	W 72–65	4–1	22 – Thomas Jr.	9 – Hill	4 – Thomas Jr.	Thomas & Mack Center (4,850); Paradise, NV
November 28, 2024*; 6:30 p.m., CBSSN		vs. No. 25 Mississippi State; Arizona Tip-Off Cactus Division semifinals	L 58–80	4–2	13 – Bedford	5 – Tied	6 – Thomas Jr.	Mullett Arena (1,736); Tempe, AZ
November 29, 2024*; 4:00 p.m., CBSSN		vs. Northwestern; Arizona Tip-Off Cactus Division 3rd place game	L 61−66	4−3	17 – Thomas Jr.	10 – Cherry	2 – Tied	Mullett Arena; Tempe, AZ
December 7, 2024*; 1:00 p.m., FS1		at Creighton	L 65–83	4–4	20 – Bedford	4 – Tied	2 – Tied	CHI Health Center Omaha (17,080); Omaha, NE
December 14, 2024*; 7:30 p.m., Baller TV		vs. Pacific; Jack Jones Classic	W 72–65	5–4	21 – Rishwain	10 – N'Diaye	5 – Thomas Jr.	Lee's Family Forum; Henderson, NV
December 17, 2024*; 4:00 p.m., Peacock		at No. 22 Dayton	L 65–66	5–5	16 – Thomas Jr.	7 – Henley	6 – Thomas Jr.	UD Arena (13,407); Dayton, OH
December 21, 2024*; 12:00 p.m., SSSEN/MW Network		UC Riverside	W 66–53	6–5	15 – Thomas Jr.	7 – Rishwain	5 – Thomas Jr.	Thomas & Mack Center (4,105); Paradise, NV
Mountain West regular season
December 28, 2024; 7:00 p.m., SSSEN/MW Network		Fresno State	W 87–77	7–5 (1–0)	21 – Thomas Jr.	8 – Hicks	6 – Thomas Jr.	Thomas & Mack Center (5,590); Paradise, NV
December 31, 2024; 1:00 p.m., MW Network		at Air Force	W 77–58	8–5 (2–0)	16 – Rishwain	9 – Hill	3 – Thomas Jr.	Clune Arena (2,092); Colorado Springs, CO
January 4, 2025; 3:00 p.m., SSSEN/MW Network		San Jose State	W 79–73	9–5 (3–0)	17 – Thomas Jr.	5 – Tied	6 – Tied	Thomas & Mack Center (5,182); Paradise, NV
January 7, 2025; 7:30 p.m., FS1		at Boise State	L 59–81	9–6 (3–1)	11 – Bedford	5 – Cherry	4 – Thomas Jr.	ExtraMile Arena (10,117); Boise, ID
January 11, 2025; 1:00 p.m., MW Network		at Colorado State	L 62–84	9–7 (3–2)	19 – Tied	8 – Bedford	6 – Thomas Jr.	Moby Arena (3,912); Fort Collins, CO
January 15, 2025; 8:00 p.m., CBSSN		No. 22 Utah State	W 65–62	10–7 (4–2)	15 – Hill	8 – Hill	6 – Thomas Jr.	Thomas & Mack Center (4,659); Paradise, NV
January 18, 2025; 5:00 p.m., CBSSN		at San Diego State; Rivalry	W 76–68	11–7 (5–2)	19 – Thomas Jr.	8 – Henley	5 – Thomas Jr.	Viejas Arena (12,414); San Diego, CA
January 21, 2025; 8:00 p.m., CBSSN		Wyoming	L 61–63	11–8 (5–3)	17 – Thomas Jr.	9 – Cherry	4 – Thomas Jr.	Thomas & Mack Center (4,685); Paradise, NV
January 25, 2025; 12:00 p.m., FOX		New Mexico	L 73–75	11–9 (5–4)	18 – Thomas Jr.	8 – N'Diaye	7 – Thomas Jr.	Thomas & Mack Center (6,158); Paradise, NV
January 29, 2025; 7:00 p.m., FS1		at Utah State	L 71–76	11–10 (5–5)	22 – Thomas Jr.	6 – Henley	6 – Thomas Jr.	Smith Spectrum (9,740); Logan, UT
February 1, 2025; 7:00 p.m., CBSSN		at Nevada; Rivalry	L 65–71	11–11 (5–6)	14 – Henley	5 – N'Diaye	6 – Thomas Jr.	Lawlor Events Center (11,008); Reno, NV
February 4, 2025; 8:00 p.m., CBSSN		Boise State	L 62–71	11–12 (5–7)	20 – Thomas Jr.	9 – Rishwain	4 – Rishwain	Thomas & Mack Center (5,081); Paradise, NV
February 8, 2025; 1:00 p.m., MW Network		at Wyoming	W 68–57	12–12 (6–7)	18 – Thomas Jr.	6 – Cherry	3 – Thomas Jr.	Arena-Auditorium (3,787); Laramie, WY
February 11, 2025; 7:00 p.m., SSSEN/MW Network		Air Force	W 77–52	13–12 (7–7)	15 – Cherry	6 – Bedford	5 – Thomas Jr.	Thomas & Mack Center (5,004); Paradise, NV
February 15, 2025; 4:00 p.m., MW Network		at Fresno State	W 52–51	14–12 (8–7)	13 – Tied	9 – Henley	7 – Thomas Jr.	Save Mart Center (5,289); Fresno, CA
February 22, 2025; 7:00 p.m., CBSSN		Colorado State	L 53–61	14–13 (8–8)	17 – Bedford	8 – Hill	4 – Tied	Thomas & Mack Center (5,817); Paradise, NV
February 25, 2025; 7:00 p.m., MW Network		at San Jose State	W 77–71	15–13 (9–8)	22 – Henley	9 – Hill	5 – Henley	Provident Credit Union Event Center (2,339); San Jose, CA
February 28, 2025; 8:00 p.m., FS1		Nevada; Rivalry	W 68–55	16–13 (10–8)	23 – Henley	9 – Cherry	3 – Tied	Thomas & Mack Center (7,466); Paradise, NV
March 4, 2025; 8:00 p.m., CBSSN		San Diego State; Rivalry	W 74–67	17–13 (11–8)	26 – Rishwain	8 – Bedford	4 – Tied	Thomas & Mack Center (5,393); Paradise, NV
March 7, 2025; 7:00 p.m., CBSSN		at New Mexico	L 67–81	17–14 (11–9)	16 – Hill	7 – Bedford	2 – Tied	The Pit (15,411); Albuquerque, NM
Mountain West tournament
March 12, 2025; 4:00 p.m., MW Network	(6)	vs. (11) Air Force; First Round	W 68–59	18–14	18 – Hill	10 – Hill	7 – Hill	Thomas & Mack Center; Paradise, NV
March 13, 2025; 8:30 p.m., CBSSN	(6)	vs. (3) Utah State; Quarterfinals	L 58–70	18–15	19 – Henley	7 – Hill	3 – Henley	Thomas & Mack Center; Paradise, NV
*Non-conference game. ^{#}Rankings from AP Poll. (#) Tournament seedings in parentheses. All times are in Pacific Time.
