= 2024–25 New Mexico Lobos men's basketball team =

American college basketball season

2024–25 New Mexico Lobos men's basketball

Mountain West regular season champions

NCAA tournament, Second Round
- Conference: Mountain West Conference
- Record: 27–8 (17–3 MW)
- Head coach: Richard Pitino (4th season)
- Associate head coach: Isaac Chew (3rd season)
- Assistant coaches: Tarvish Felton (3rd season); Aaron Katsuma (2nd season); Dave Pilipovich (1st season); Danny Walters (1st season)
- Home arena: The Pit

2024–25 Mountain West Conference men's basketball standings
	Conf.				Overall
Team	W		L	PCT	W		L	PCT
New Mexico	17	–	3	.850	27	–	8	.771
Colorado State †	16	–	4	.800	26	–	10	.722
Utah State	15	–	5	.750	26	–	8	.765
San Diego State	14	–	6	.700	21	–	10	.677
Boise State	14	–	6	.700	26	–	11	.703
UNLV	11	–	9	.550	18	–	15	.545
Nevada	8	–	12	.400	17	–	16	.515
San Jose State	7	–	13	.350	15	–	20	.429
Wyoming	5	–	15	.250	12	–	20	.375
Fresno State	2	–	18	.100	6	–	26	.188
Air Force	1	–	19	.050	4	–	28	.125
† 2025 Mountain West tournament winner

The 2024–25 New Mexico Lobos men's basketball team represented the University of New Mexico during the 2024–25 NCAA Division I men's basketball season. The Lobos, led by fourth-year head coach Richard Pitino, played their home games at The Pit in Albuquerque, New Mexico as members of the Mountain West Conference. The Lobos finished 27–8 with a 17–3 record in Mountain West play, finishing as Mountain West regular season champions. They defeated San Jose State in the first round of the Mountain West conference tournament before losing to Boise State in the semifinals.

New Mexico received an at-large bid to the 2025 NCAA Division I men's basketball tournament, where it was named the 10-seed in the South Regional. The Lobos upset 7-seed Marquette in the first round before losing to 2-seed Michigan State in the second round.

The New Mexico Lobos drew an average home attendance of 13,051, the highest of all basketball teams from New Mexico.

== Previous season ==
The Lobos finished the 2023–24 season 26–10, 10–8 in Mountain West play to finish in a tie for sixth place. As the No. 6 seed in the Mountain West tournament, they beat Air Force in the first round, Boise State in the quarterfinals, Colorado State in the semifinals, and San Diego State in the championship to clinch the NCAA tournament. As the No. 11 seed in the West Region, they lost to Clemson in the first round.

== Offseason ==
=== Departures ===
New Mexico departures
Name	Number	Pos.	Height	Weight	Year	Hometown	Reason for departure
Jemarl Baker Jr.	0	G	6'5"	205	GS Senior	Menifee, CA	Graduated
Jamal Mashburn Jr.	5	G	6'2"	195	Senior	Miami, FL	Transferred to Temple
Jaelen House	10	G	6'0"	170	GS Senior	Phoenix, AZ	Graduated
Isaac Mushila	12	F	6'5"	210	GS Senior	Lubumbashi, Congo	Graduated
JT Toppin	15	F	6'9"	210	Freshman	Dallas, TX	Transferred to Texas Tech
Sebastian Forsling	21	C	7'0"	245	Junior	Floda, Sweden	Left the team; signed professional contract with the Norrköping Dolphins

=== Incoming transfers ===
New Mexico incoming transfers
Name	Number	Pos.	Height	Weight	Year	Hometown	Previous school
CJ Noland	0	G	6'4"	215	GS Senior	Waxahachie, TX	North Texas
Atiki Ally Atiki	6	F	6'10"	220	Senior	Mwanza, Tanzania	BYU
Ibrahima Sacko	7	F	6'6"	225	Sophomore	Conakry, Guinea	Georgia Tech
Filip Borovićanin	8	F	6'9"	225	Junior	Belgrade, Serbia	Arizona

=== Recruiting classes ===
==== 2024 recruiting class ====
College recruiting information
Name	Hometown	School	Height	Weight	Commit date
Kayde Dotson; CG	Beaumont, Texas	Beaumont United High School	6 ft 2 in (1.88 m)	170 lb (77 kg)	Sep 20, 2023
Kayde Dotson; CG	Recruit ratings: Rivals: 247Sports: ESPN: (N/A)				
Jovan Milicevic; PF	Toronto, Ontario	Dream City Christian School	6 ft 10 in (2.08 m)	240 lb (110 kg)	Oct 16, 2023
Jovan Milicevic; PF	Recruit ratings: Rivals: 247Sports: ESPN: (82)				
Daniel Thomas; PF	Dallas, Texas	David W. Carter High School	6 ft 8 in (2.03 m)	200 lb (91 kg)	May 16, 2024
Daniel Thomas; PF	Recruit ratings: Rivals: 247Sports: ESPN: (N/A)				
Overall recruit ranking: Rivals: — 247Sports: 93 ESPN: —
Note: In many cases, Scout, Rivals, 247Sports, On3, and ESPN may conflict in their listings of height and weight.; In these cases, the average was taken. ESPN grades are on a 100-point scale.; Sources: "New Mexico 2024 Basketball Commitments". Rivals.; "2024 New Mexico Lobos Recruiting Class". ESPN.; "2024 Team Ranking". Rivals.

==== 2025 recruiting class ====
There are no current recruits for 2025.

== Roster ==
2024–25 New Mexico Lobos men's basketball team
Players
Coaches

Pos.	#	Name	Height	Weight	Year	Previous school	Hometown
G	0	CJ Noland	6 ft 4 in (1.93 m)	220 lb (100 kg)	GS	North Texas	Waxahachie, TX
G	1	Braden Appelhans	6 ft 7 in (2.01 m)	195 lb (88 kg)	RS So	Western Reserve Academy	Blue Springs, MO
G	2	Donovan Dent	6 ft 2 in (1.88 m)	185 lb (84 kg)	Jr	Centennial HS	Riverside, CA
G	3	Tru Washington	6 ft 4 in (1.93 m)	195 lb (88 kg)	So	AZ Compass Prep	Phoenix, AZ
G	4	Kayde Dotson	6 ft 2 in (1.88 m)	180 lb (82 kg)	Fr	Beaumont United HS	Beaumont, TX
F	6	Atiki Ally Atiki	6 ft 10 in (2.08 m)	210 lb (95 kg)	Sr	BYU	Mwanza, Tanzania
F	7	Ibrahima Sacko	6 ft 6 in (1.98 m)	240 lb (109 kg)	So	Georgia Tech	Conakry, Guinea
F	8	Filip Borovićanin	6 ft 9 in (2.06 m)	220 lb (100 kg)	Jr	Arizona	Belgrade, Serbia
G	11	Quinton Webb	6 ft 6 in (1.98 m)	200 lb (91 kg)	RS So	Etiwanda HS	San Bernardino, CA
F	13	Daniel Thomas	6 ft 8 in (2.03 m)	215 lb (98 kg)	Fr	David W. Carter HS	Dallas, TX
F	21	Deraje Agbaosi (W)	6 ft 7 in (2.01 m)	215 lb (98 kg)	RS Jr	North Alabama	Union Township, NJ
F	22	Mustapha Amzil	6 ft 9 in (2.06 m)	215 lb (98 kg)	RS Sr	Dayton	Helsinki, Finland
C	23	Nelly Junior Joseph	6 ft 10 in (2.08 m)	245 lb (111 kg)	RS Sr	Iona	Benin City, Nigeria
F	24	Jovan Milicevic	6 ft 10 in (2.08 m)	260 lb (118 kg)	Fr	Dream City Christian School	Toronto, Ontario
G	32	Shane Douma-Sanchez (W)	6 ft 1 in (1.85 m)	175 lb (79 kg)	RS Fr	Del Norte HS	Laguna, NM
G	35	Dylan Chavez (W)	6 ft 5 in (1.96 m)	185 lb (84 kg)	Fr	La Cueva HS	Albuquerque, NM

Head coach

- Richard Pitino (Providence)

Assistant coach(es)

- Isaac Chew (Avila)
- Tarvish Felton (Southern Utah)
- Aaron Katsuma (Minnesota State)
- Dave Pilipovich (Thiel)
- Danny Walters (Texas A&M)

Legend

- (C) Team captain
- (S) Suspended
- (I) Ineligible
- (W) Walk-on
- Injured
- Current redshirt

Roster
Last update: June 4, 2024

== Schedule and results ==
Date time, TV	Rank^{#}	Opponent^{#}	Result	Record	High points	High rebounds	High assists	Site (attendance) city, state
Exhibition
October 28, 2024*; 7:00 p.m.		UTEP	W 74–70		19 – Dent	16 – Joseph	5 – Dent	The Pit (10,359); Albuquerque, New Mexico
Regular season
November 4, 2024*; 7:00 p.m., MW Network		Nicholls	W 91–84	1–0	28 – Joseph	16 – Joseph	11 – Dent	The Pit (10,609); Albuquerque, New Mexico
November 8, 2024*; 9:00 p.m., CBSSN		vs. No. 22 UCLA; Las Vegas Hoopfest	W 72–64	2–0	17 – Dent	12 – Joseph	8 – Dent	Lee's Family Forum; Henderson, Nevada
November 12, 2024*; 7:00 p.m., MW Network		Texas A&M–Corpus Christi	W 100–81	3–0	25 – Dent	9 – Joseph	10 – Dent	The Pit (11,160); Albuquerque, New Mexico
November 17, 2024*; 10:00 a.m., FS1		at No. 22 St. John's; NYC Hoops for Heroes Classic	L 71–85	3–1	16 – Tied	6 – Atiki	6 – Dent	Madison Square Garden (12,310); New York City, New York
November 21, 2024*; 7:00 p.m., MW Network		Grambling State; Acrisure Classic campus site game	W 80–58	4–1	22 – Dent	11 – Joseph	8 – Dent	The Pit (10,966); Albuquerque, New Mexico
November 24, 2024*; 6:00 p.m., MW Network		Texas Southern	W 99–68	5–1	19 – Washington	10 – Washington	5 – Dent	The Pit (11,286); Albuquerque, New Mexico
November 28, 2024*; 9:30 p.m., TruTV		vs. Arizona State; Acrisure Classic semifinals	L 82–85	5–2	30 – Dent	8 – Amzil	7 – Dent	Acrisure Arena (732); Thousand Palms, California
November 29, 2024*; 10:00 p.m., TruTV		vs. USC; Acrisure Classic 3rd place game	W 83–73	6–2	20 – Washington	6 – Tied	11 – Dent	Acrisure Arena (310); Thousand Palms, California
December 4, 2024; 7:00 p.m., MW Network		San Jose State	W 83–77	7–2 (1–0)	20 – Dent	10 – Joseph	5 – Dent	The Pit (10,658); Albuquerque, New Mexico
December 7, 2024*; 7:00 p.m., MW Network		New Mexico State; Rio Grande Rivalry	L 83–89 ^{OT}	7–3	16 – Joseph	17 – Joseph	4 – Dent	The Pit (15,411); Albuquerque, New Mexico
December 14, 2024*; 2:00 p.m., MW Network		Western New Mexico	W 122–70	8–3	21 – Milicevic	6 – Tied	8 – Dent	The Pit (11,419); Albuquerque, New Mexico
December 18, 2024*; 7:00 p.m., MW Network		VCU	W 78–71	9–3	40 – Dent	11 – Joseph	4 – Dent	The Pit (11,483); Albuquerque, New Mexico
December 28, 2024; 2:00 p.m., MW Network		at Colorado State	W 76–68	10–3 (2–0)	14 – Tied	11 – Joseph	6 – Dent	Moby Arena (4,772); Fort Collins, Colorado
December 31, 2024; 6:00 p.m., MW Network		at Fresno State	W 103–89	11–3 (3–0)	23 – Tied	12 – Joseph	6 – Tied	Save Mart Center (5,583); Fresno, California
January 3, 2025; 9:00 p.m., FS1		Nevada	W 82–81 ^{OT}	12–3 (4–0)	20 – Tied	10 – Joseph	6 – Dent	The Pit (14,622); Albuquerque, New Mexico
January 7, 2025; 8:00 p.m., CBSSN		at Wyoming	W 61–53	13–3 (5–0)	22 – Dent	12 – Joseph	6 – Dent	Arena-Auditorium (2,938); Laramie, Wyoming
January 11, 2025; 11:00 a.m., CBS		San Diego State	W 62–48	14–3 (6–0)	16 – Dent	11 – Amzil	5 – Dent	The Pit (15,428); Albuquerque, New Mexico
January 14, 2025; 8:00 p.m., MW Network		at San Jose State	L 70–71	14–4 (6–1)	20 – Joseph	7 – Borovićanin	5 – Dent	Provident Credit Union Event Center (1,853); San Jose, California
January 17, 2025; 9:00 p.m., FS1		Boise State	W 84–65	15–4 (7–1)	16 – Tied	10 – Borovićanin	7 – Dent	The Pit (14,519); Albuquerque, New Mexico
January 20, 2025; 3:00 p.m., CBSSN		Fresno State	W 95–67	16–4 (8–1)	20 – Dent	15 – Joseph	9 – Dent	The Pit (13,111); Albuquerque, New Mexico
January 25, 2025; 1:00 p.m., FOX		at UNLV	W 75–73	17–4 (9–1)	34 – Dent	18 – Joseph	3 – Borovićanin	Thomas & Mack Center (6,158); Paradise, Nevada
February 1, 2025; 7:30 p.m., FS1		at Utah State	W 82–63	18–4 (10–1)	16 – Amzil	13 – Joseph	6 – Dent	Smith Spectrum (10,270); Logan, UT
February 5, 2025; 8:30 p.m., FS1		Colorado State	W 87-65	19–4 (11–1)	19 – Tied	11 – Joseph	4 – Tied	The Pit (13,436); Albuquerque, New Mexico
February 8, 2025; 2:00 p.m., MW Network		at Air Force	W 88–53	20–4 (12–1)	25 – Dent	21 – Joseph	6 – Dent	Clune Arena (2,619); Colorado Springs, Colorado
February 12, 2025; 8:00 p.m., FS1		Wyoming	W 71–67	21–4 (13–1)	20 – Dent	8 – Joseph	7 – Dent	The Pit (11,852); Albuquerque, New Mexico
February 16, 2025; 2:00 p.m., CBSSN		Utah State	W 82–79	22–4 (14–1)	25 – Washington	7 – Milicevic	4 – Washington	The Pit (15,411); Albuquerque, New Mexico
February 19, 2025; 8:00 p.m., CBSSN		at Boise State	L 78–86	22–5 (14–2)	18 – Borovićanin	8 – Joseph	11 – Dent	ExtraMile Arena (11,110); Boise, Idaho
February 25, 2025; 9:00 p.m., FS1		at San Diego State	L 65–73	22–6 (14–3)	26 – Dent	16 – Joseph	7 – Dent	Viejas Arena (12,414); San Diego, California
March 1, 2025; 2:00 p.m., MW Network		Air Force	W 92–71	23–6 (15–3)	23 – Dent	13 – Joseph	6 – Dent	The Pit (15,054); Albuquerque, New Mexico
March 4, 2025; 7:00 p.m., CBSSN		at Nevada	W 71–67	24–6 (16–3)	33 – Dent	15 – Joseph	7 – Dent	Lawlor Events Center (7,881); Reno, Nevada
March 7, 2025; 8:00 p.m., CBSSN		UNLV	W 81–67	25–6 (17–3)	26 – Joseph	16 – Joseph	6 – Dent	The Pit (15,411); Albuquerque, New Mexico
Mountain West tournament
March 13, 2025; 1:00 pm, CBSSN	(1)	vs. (8) San Jose State; Quarterfinals	W 63–52	26–6	25 – Dent	18 – Joseph	5 – Dent	Thomas & Mack Center (8,031); Paradise, Nevada
March 14, 2025; 7:30 pm, CBSSN	(1)	vs. (5) Boise State; Semifinals	L 69–72	26–7	23 – Dent	8 – Joseph	5 – Dent	Thomas & Mack Center; Paradise, Nevada
NCAA tournament
March 21, 2025; 5:25 p.m., TBS	(10 S)	vs. (7 S) Marquette; First Round	W 75–66	27–7	21 – Dent	8 – Amzil	6 – Dent	Rocket Arena (17,392); Cleveland, OH
March 23, 2025; 6:40 p.m., TNT	(10 S)	vs. (2 S) No. 8 Michigan State; Second Round	L 63–71	27–8	16 – Joseph	7 – Tied	6 – Dent	Rocket Arena (15,791); Cleveland, OH
*Non-conference game. ^{#}Rankings from AP Poll. (#) Tournament seedings in parentheses. S=South. All times are in Mountain Time.

== Rankings ==
Ranking movements Legend: ██ Increase in ranking ██ Decrease in ranking — = Not ranked RV = Received votes
	Week																				
Poll	Pre	1	2	3	4	5	6	7	8	9	10	11	12	13	14	15	16	17	18	19	Final
AP	—	RV	—	—	—	—	—	—	—	—	RV	—	RV	RV	RV	RV	RV	RV	RV	—	RV
Coaches	—	RV	—	—	—	—	—	—	—	—	RV	—	RV	RV	RV	RV	RV	RV	RV	—	RV
