= 2024–25 Air Force Falcons men's basketball team =

American college basketball season

2024–25 Air Force Falcons men's basketball
- Conference: Mountain West Conference
- Record: 4–28 (1–19 MW)
- Head coach: Joe Scott (5th straight, 9th overall season)
- Associate head coach: David Metzendorf
- Assistant coaches: Lt. Col. Matt McCraw; Zack Curran; Derek Brooks; Eamonn Kearney; Jon Jordan
- Home arena: Clune Arena

2024–25 Mountain West Conference men's basketball standings
	Conf.				Overall
Team	W		L	PCT	W		L	PCT
New Mexico	17	–	3	.850	27	–	8	.771
Colorado State †	16	–	4	.800	26	–	10	.722
Utah State	15	–	5	.750	26	–	8	.765
San Diego State	14	–	6	.700	21	–	10	.677
Boise State	14	–	6	.700	26	–	11	.703
UNLV	11	–	9	.550	18	–	15	.545
Nevada	8	–	12	.400	17	–	16	.515
San Jose State	7	–	13	.350	15	–	20	.429
Wyoming	5	–	15	.250	12	–	20	.375
Fresno State	2	–	18	.100	6	–	26	.188
Air Force	1	–	19	.050	4	–	28	.125
† 2025 Mountain West tournament winner

The 2024–25 Air Force Falcons men's basketball team represented the United States Air Force Academy during the 2024–25 NCAA Division I men's basketball season. The Falcons, led by head coach Joe Scott in his fifth season in his second stint with the team (ninth overall), played their home games at Clune Arena in Colorado Springs, Colorado.

Air Force finished the season 4–28, with a 1–19 record in Mountain West play, finishing in last place. They lost to UNLV in the first round of the Mountain West conference tournament.

== Previous season ==
The Falcons finished the 2023–24 season 9–22, 2–16 in Mountain West play to finish in a tie for last place. They were defeated by eventual tournament champions New Mexico in the first round of the Mountain West tournament.

== Offseason ==
=== Departures ===
Departures
Name	Number	Pos.	Height	Weight	Year	Hometown	Reason for departure
Dawson Sarblah	2	G	6'6"	200	Junior	Greenville, Alabama	Left the team
Corbin Green	15	F	6'5"	230	Sophomore	Midlothian, Texas	Transferred to Texas Tech
Solo Jones	21	F	6'8"	202	Sophomore	Long Beach, California	Left the team
Kellan Boylan	23	G/F	6'7"	200	Sophomore	Overland Park, Kansas	Transferred to Lipscomb
Warren Gorman	25	F	6'7"	205	Freshman	Washington, D.C.	Left the team
Rytis Petraitis	31	F	6'7"	210	Sophomore	Arlington, Texas	Transferred to California
Brady Ruggles	33	G	6'6"	195	Freshman	Wheaton, Illinois	Left the team
Nate Robinson	40	G	5'9"	145	Freshman	Orlando, Florida	Left the team

=== Recruiting class ===
College recruiting information
Name	Hometown	School	Height	Weight	Commit date
A.J. Patterson; G	Atlanta, Georgia	Mount Vernon Presbyterian School	6 ft 3 in (1.91 m)	200 lb (91 kg)	
A.J. Patterson; G	Recruit ratings: Rivals: 247Sports: ESPN: (N/A)				
Will Cooper; F	Omaha, Nebraska	Millard South High School	6 ft 6 in (1.98 m)	210 lb (95 kg)	
Will Cooper; F	Recruit ratings: Rivals: 247Sports: ESPN: (N/A)				
Elliott Taite; G	Frisco, Texas	Heritage High School	6 ft 3 in (1.91 m)	195 lb (88 kg)	
Elliott Taite; G	Recruit ratings: Rivals: 247Sports: ESPN: (N/A)				
Christian Umaña; G	League City, Texas	Clear Creek High School	6 ft 6 in (1.98 m)	205 lb (93 kg)	
Christian Umaña; G	Recruit ratings: Rivals: 247Sports: ESPN: (N/A)				
Miles Clark; F	Seattle, Washington	USAFA Prep School	6 ft 7 in (2.01 m)	197 lb (89 kg)	
Miles Clark; F	Recruit ratings: Rivals: 247Sports: ESPN: (N/A)				
Yoda Oke; G	Fullerton, California	Sonora High School	6 ft 6 in (1.98 m)	195 lb (88 kg)	
Yoda Oke; G	Recruit ratings: Rivals: 247Sports: ESPN: (N/A)				
Sam Springer; F	Cleveland, Ohio	Saint Ignatius High School	6 ft 7 in (2.01 m)	215 lb (98 kg)	
Sam Springer; F	Recruit ratings: Rivals: 247Sports: ESPN: (N/A)				
Sam Duskin; G	Cullman, Alabama	Cullman High School	6 ft 4 in (1.93 m)	180 lb (82 kg)	
Sam Duskin; G	Recruit ratings: Rivals: 247Sports: ESPN: (N/A)				
Eli Robinson; F	Monument, Colorado	USAFA Prep School	6 ft 6 in (1.98 m)	215 lb (98 kg)	
Eli Robinson; F	Recruit ratings: Rivals: 247Sports: ESPN: (N/A)				
Kyle Marshall; G	Oyster Bay, New York	USAFA Prep School	6 ft 4 in (1.93 m)	190 lb (86 kg)	
Kyle Marshall; G	Recruit ratings: Rivals: 247Sports: ESPN: (N/A)				
Overall recruit ranking:
Note: In many cases, Scout, Rivals, 247Sports, On3, and ESPN may conflict in their listings of height and weight.; In these cases, the average was taken. ESPN grades are on a 100-point scale.; Sources: "2024 Team Ranking". Rivals.

== Roster ==
2024–25 Air Force Falcons men's basketball team
Players
Coaches

Pos.	#	Name	Height	Weight	Year	Previous school	Hometown
F	0	Josh Gatete	6 ft 9 in (2.06 m)	195 lb (88 kg)	So	Penn High School	Granger, Indiana
G	1	Sam Akinrelere	6 ft 3 in (1.91 m)	220 lb (100 kg)	So	USAFA Prep School	Houston, Texas
G	2	A.J. Patterson	6 ft 3 in (1.91 m)	200 lb (91 kg)	Fr	Mount Vernon Presbyterian School	Atlanta, Georgia
F	3	Luke Kearney	6 ft 7 in (2.01 m)	215 lb (98 kg)	So	USAFA Prep School	Phoenix, Arizona
F	4	Wyatt Boeker	6 ft 8 in (2.03 m)	205 lb (93 kg)	So	The Woodlands Christian Academy	Tomball, Texas
G	5	Ethan Taylor (C)	6 ft 5 in (1.96 m)	205 lb (93 kg)	Sr	USAFA Prep School	Houston, Texas
F	6	Will Cooper	6 ft 6 in (1.98 m)	210 lb (95 kg)	Fr	Millard South High School	Omaha, Nebraska
G	7	Elliott Taite	6 ft 3 in (1.91 m)	195 lb (88 kg)	Fr	Heritage High School	Frisco, Texas
G	9	Christian Umaña	6 ft 6 in (1.98 m)	205 lb (93 kg)	Fr	Clear Creek High School	League City, Texas
F	10	Caleb Walker	6 ft 9 in (2.06 m)	240 lb (109 kg)	So	USAFA Prep School	Jefferson City, Missouri
G	11	Byron Brown	6 ft 5 in (1.96 m)	210 lb (95 kg)	Sr	USAFA Prep School	Sahuarita, Arizona
F	12	Miles Clark	6 ft 7 in (2.01 m)	197 lb (89 kg)	Fr	USAFA Prep School	Seattle, Washington
G/F	13	Chase Beasley	6 ft 7 in (2.01 m)	195 lb (88 kg)	Sr	USAFA Prep School	Fort Washington, Maryland
F	14	Beau Becker	6 ft 7 in (2.01 m)	210 lb (95 kg)	Sr	USAFA Prep School	Dallas, Texas
G	20	Yoda Oke	6 ft 6 in (1.98 m)	195 lb (88 kg)	Fr	Sonora High School	Fullerton, California
F	22	Sam Springer	6 ft 7 in (2.01 m)	215 lb (98 kg)	Fr	Saint Ignatius High School	Cleveland, Ohio
G	23	Sam Duskin	6 ft 4 in (1.93 m)	180 lb (82 kg)	Fr	Cullman High School	Cullman, Alabama
G	24	Jeffrey Mills (C)	6 ft 4 in (1.93 m)	200 lb (91 kg)	Sr	USAFA Prep School	Flower Mound, Texas
F	30	Eli Robinson	6 ft 6 in (1.98 m)	215 lb (98 kg)	Fr	USAFA Prep School	Monument, Colorado
F	32	Kolby Gilles	6 ft 5 in (1.96 m)	240 lb (109 kg)	So	USAFA Prep School	Chicago, Illinois
G	35	Kyle Marshall	6 ft 4 in (1.93 m)	190 lb (86 kg)	Fr	USAFA Prep School	Oyster Bay, New York
C	51	Wesley Celichowski	7 ft 0 in (2.13 m)	245 lb (111 kg)	So	USAFA Prep School	Georgetown, Indiana

Head coach

- Joe Scott (Princeton)

Assistant coach(es)

- David Metzendorf (Ithaca)
- Lt. Col. Matt McCraw (Air Force)
- Zack Curran (Virginia Tech)
- Derek Brooks (Air Force)
- Eamonn Kearney (Drew)
- Jon Jordan (Air Force)

Legend

- (C) Team captain
- (S) Suspended
- (I) Ineligible
- (W) Walk-on
- Injured
- Current redshirt

Roster
Last update: November 26, 2024

== Schedule and results ==
Date time, TV	Rank^{#}	Opponent^{#}	Result	Record	High points	High rebounds	High assists	Site (attendance) city, state
Non-conference regular season
November 4, 2024*; 7:30 pm, MW Network		North Alabama	L 57–73	0–1	30 – Taylor	8 – Taylor	4 – Mills	Clune Arena (1,212); Colorado Springs, CO
November 7, 2024*; 7:00 pm, MW Network		Jacksonville State	W 73–67	1–1	23 – Taylor	10 – Taylor	6 – Taylor	Clune Arena (453); Colorado Springs, CO
November 11, 2024*; 2:00 pm, Altitude/MW Network		LIU	L 54–63	1–2	19 – Celichowski	4 – Tied	4 – Taylor	Clune Arena (409); Colorado Springs, CO
November 15, 2024*; 5:00 pm, MW Network		Belmont	L 71–79	1–3	17 – Walker	10 – Taylor	7 – Taylor	Clune Arena (2,001); Colorado Springs, CO
November 21, 2024*; 8:00 pm, ACCNX/ESPN+		at California; Cal Classic	L 69–78	1–4	23 – Taylor	5 – Marshall	3 – Tied	Haas Pavilion (3,631); Berkeley, CA
November 24, 2024*; 2:00 pm, Altitude/MW Network		Mercyhurst; Cal Classic	W 82–48	2–4	21 – Taylor	10 – Taylor	10 – Mills	Clune Arena (1,737); Colorado Springs, CO
November 27, 2024*; 2:00 pm, MW Network		Sacramento State; Cal Classic	L 61–63	2–5	19 – Mills	8 – Taylor	5 – Tied	Clune Arena (1,529); Colorado Springs, CO
November 30, 2024*; 5:00 pm, ESPN+		at Wright State	L 57–70	2–6	15 – Celichowski	11 – Brown	3 – Taylor	Nutter Center (9,672); Fairborn, OH
December 2, 2024*; 5:00 pm, ESPN+		at Miami (OH)	L 60–73	2–7	16 – Kearney	5 – Mills	5 – Taylor	Millett Hall (1,637); Oxford, OH
December 7, 2024*; 1:00 pm		vs. Stony Brook; Legends Showcase	W 69–61	3–7	22 – Celichowski	8 – Taylor	6 – Taylor	Comerica Center (1,142); Frisco, TX
December 16, 2024*; 7:00 pm, ESPN+		at Northern Colorado	L 76–81	3–8	23 – Marshall	4 – Taylor	2 – Walker	Bank of Colorado Arena (1,183); Greeley, CO
Mountain West regular season
December 21, 2024; 1:30 pm, MW Network		at Boise State	L 59–77	3–9 (0–1)	16 – Kearney	6 – Walker	5 – Taylor	ExtraMile Arena (10,471); Boise, ID
December 31, 2024; 2:00 pm, Altitude/MW Network		UNLV	L 58–77	3–10 (0–2)	14 – Taylor	9 – Kearney	2 – Tied	Clune Arena (2,092); Colorado Springs, CO
January 4, 2025; 3:00 pm, Altitude2/MW Network		Wyoming	L 65–70	3–11 (0–3)	19 – Celichowski	7 – Taylor	8 – Taylor	Clune Arena (2,482); Colorado Springs, CO
January 8, 2025; 8:30 pm, FS1		at San Diego State	L 38–67	3–12 (0–4)	11 – Taylor	5 – Taylor	2 – Walker	Viejas Arena (12,414); San Diego, CA
January 11, 2025; 1:00 pm, Altitude/MW Network		San Jose State	L 62–69	3–13 (0–5)	16 – Taylor	5 – Marshall	6 – Taylor	Clune Arena (1,545); Colorado Springs, CO
January 14, 2025; 8:00 pm, Altitude2/MW Network		at Nevada	L 62–68	3–14 (0–6)	22 – Taylor	8 – Marshall	5 – Marshall	Lawlor Events Center (7,430); Reno, NV
January 17, 2025; 8:00 pm, MW Network		at Fresno State	L 65–74	3–15 (0–7)	20 – Kearney	11 – Kearney	6 – Taylor	Save Mart Center (4,797); Fresno, CA
January 22, 2025; 8:00 pm, CBSSN		San Diego State	L 76–77 ^{OT}	3–16 (0–8)	22 – Celichowski	11 – Marshall	3 – Tied	Clune Arena (1,434); Colorado Springs, CO
January 25, 2025; 2:00 pm, MW Network		Utah State	L 58–87	3–17 (0–9)	18 – Taylor	6 – Taylor	5 – Walker	Clune Arena (1,735); Colorado Springs, CO
January 28, 2025; 7:00 pm, MW Network		at Colorado State	L 58–79	3–18 (0–10)	22 – Taylor	6 – Tied	3 – Tied	Moby Arena (4,367); Fort Collins, CO
February 1, 2025; 3:00 pm, MW Network		at San Jose State	L 64–75	3–19 (0–11)	15 – Taylor	12 – Marshall	2 – Tied	Provident Credit Union Event Center (2,037); San Jose, CA
February 4, 2025; 7:00 pm, Altitude2/MW Network		Nevada	L 60–74	3–20 (0–12)	15 – Taylor	6 – Tied	3 – Tied	Clune Arena (2,134); Colorado Springs, CO
February 8, 2025; 2:00 pm, Altitude/MW Network		New Mexico	L 53–88	3–21 (0–13)	12 – Kearney	6 – Tied	6 – Marshall	Clune Arena (2,619); Colorado Springs, CO
February 11, 2025; 8:00 pm, MW Network		at UNLV	L 52–77	3–22 (0–14)	17 – Kearney	6 – Kearney	2 – Tied	Thomas & Mack Center (5,004); Paradise, NV
February 18, 2025; 6:30 pm, MW Network		at Wyoming	L 62–69	3–23 (0–15)	16 – Celichowski	7 – Marshall	3 – Tied	Arena-Auditorium (3,211); Laramie, WY
February 22, 2025; 2:00 pm, Altitude2/MW Network		Fresno State	W 72–69 ^{OT}	4–23 (1–15)	21 – Cooper	8 – Taylor	8 – Taylor	Clune Arena (2,276); Colorado Springs, CO
February 25, 2025; 7:00 pm, Altitude/MW Network		Colorado State	L 55–77	4–24 (1–16)	13 – Taylor	7 – Walker	3 – Tied	Clune Arena (2,180); Colorado Springs, CO
March 1, 2025; 2:00 pm, MW Network		at New Mexico	L 71–92	4–25 (1–17)	16 – Walker	7 – Tied	9 – Marshall	The Pit (15,054); Albuquerque, NM
March 4, 2025; 7:00 pm, Altitude2/MW Network		Boise State	L 57–80	4–26 (1–18)	16 – Taylor	8 – Beasley	5 – Taylor	Clune Arena (1,641); Colorado Springs, CO
March 8, 2025; 2:00 pm, MW Network		at Utah State	L 47–87	4–27 (1–19)	16 – Cooper	3 – Tied	4 – Walker	Smith Spectrum (8,534); Logan, UT
Mountain West tournament
March 12, 2025; 5:00 pm, MW Network	(11)	vs. (6) UNLV; First round	L 59–68	4–28	23 – Taylor	6 – Taylor	5 – Mills	Thomas & Mack Center; Paradise, NV
*Non-conference game. ^{#}Rankings from AP Poll. (#) Tournament seedings in parentheses. All times are in Mountain.
