= 2024–25 Nevada Wolf Pack men's basketball team =

American college basketball season

2024–25 Nevada Wolf Pack men's basketball
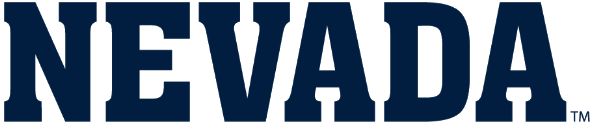
- Conference: Mountain West Conference
- Record: 17–16 (8–12 MW)
- Head coach: Steve Alford (6th season)
- Associate head coach: Craig Neal
- Assistant coaches: Bil Duany; Nate Dixon
- Home arena: Lawlor Events Center

2024–25 Mountain West Conference men's basketball standings
	Conf.				Overall
Team	W		L	PCT	W		L	PCT
New Mexico	17	–	3	.850	27	–	8	.771
Colorado State †	16	–	4	.800	26	–	10	.722
Utah State	15	–	5	.750	26	–	8	.765
San Diego State	14	–	6	.700	21	–	10	.677
Boise State	14	–	6	.700	26	–	11	.703
UNLV	11	–	9	.550	18	–	15	.545
Nevada	8	–	12	.400	17	–	16	.515
San Jose State	7	–	13	.350	15	–	20	.429
Wyoming	5	–	15	.250	12	–	20	.375
Fresno State	2	–	18	.100	6	–	26	.188
Air Force	1	–	19	.050	4	–	28	.125
† 2025 Mountain West tournament winner

The 2024–25 Nevada Wolf Pack men's basketball team represented the University of Nevada, Reno during the 2024–25 NCAA Division I men's basketball season. The Wolf Pack, led by sixth-year head coach Steve Alford, played their home games for the 40th season at the Lawlor Events Center in Reno, Nevada. They participated as members of the Mountain West Conference for the 13th season.

== Previous season ==
The Wolf Pack finished the 2023–24 season 26–6, 13–5 in Mountain West play to finish in second place. They were defeated by Colorado State in the quarterfinals of the Mountain West tournament. They received an at-large bid to the NCAA tournament as a No. 10 seed, where they lost in the first round to Dayton.

== Offseason ==
=== Departures ===
Name	Number	Pos.	Height	Weight	Year	Hometown	Reason for departure
Hunter McIntosh	0	G	6'2"	185	GS Senior	Snellville, GA	Graduated
Tyler Powell	1	G/F	6'5"	220	Junior	Los Angeles, CA	Transferred to Eastern Washington
Jarod Lucas	2	G	6'4"	195	GS Senior	Hacienda Heights, CA	Graduated
Snookey Wigington	10	G	5'8"	140	Sophomore	Los Angeles, CA	Transferred to Rider
Kenan Blackshear	13	G	6'6"	215	GS Senior	Orlando, FL	Graduated
Jazz Gardner	23	C	7'0"	225	Freshman	Pasadena, CA	Transferred to Pacific
Isaac Hymes	24	G/F	6'8"	188	Freshman	Phoenix, AZ	Walk-on; not on team roster
Tylan Pope	33	F	6'6"	240	(redshirt) Junior	Franklinton, LA	Transferred to Texas State
John Flannigan	34	F	6'8"	210	Sophomore	Concord, CA	Walk-on; not on team roster

=== Incoming transfers ===
Name	Number	Pos.	Height	Weight	Year	Hometown	Previous School
Chuck Bailey III	0	G	6'5"		Sophomore	Detroit, MI	Evansville
Brandon Love	7	F	6'9"	208	Senior	Houston, TX	Texas State
Kobe Sanders	8	G	6'8"	205	GS Senior	San Diego, CA	Cal Poly
Yuto Yamanouchi-Williams	10	C	6'10"	225	Junior	Aizuwakamatsu, Japan	Portland
Justin McBride	21	F	6'8"	230	Sophomore	Plano, TX	Oklahoma State
Xavier DuSell	53	G	6'4"	200	GS Senior	Scottsdale, AZ	Fresno State

=== 2024 recruiting class ===
There were no incoming recruits for the class of 2024.

=== 2025 recruiting class ===
College recruiting information (2025)
Name	Hometown	School	Height	Weight	Commit date
Peyton White; SF	Encino, CA	Crespi High School	6 ft 6 in (1.98 m)	220 lb (100 kg)	Sep 3, 2024
Peyton White; SF	Recruit ratings: Rivals: 247Sports: ESPN: (NR)				
Overall recruit ranking: Scout: – Rivals: –
Note: In many cases, Scout, Rivals, 247Sports, On3, and ESPN may conflict in their listings of height and weight.; In these cases, the average was taken. ESPN grades are on a 100-point scale.; Sources: "2025 Team Ranking". Rivals.

== Roster ==
2024–25 Nevada Wolf Pack men's basketball team
Players
Coaches

Pos.	#	Name	Height	Weight	Year	Previous school	Hometown
G	0	Chuck Bailey III	6 ft 4 in (1.93 m)	220 lb (100 kg)	So	Evansville	Detroit, MI
G	3	Tyler Rolison	6 ft 0 in (1.83 m)	186 lb (84 kg)	So	St. Bernard HS	Los Angeles, CA
F	4	Tré Coleman	6 ft 7 in (2.01 m)	225 lb (102 kg)	GS	Jeffersonville HS	Jeffersonville, IN
G	5	Amire Robinson	6 ft 4 in (1.93 m)	196 lb (89 kg)	So	John R. Buchtel Community Learning Center	Akron, OH
F	7	Brandon Love	6 ft 10 in (2.08 m)	230 lb (104 kg)	Sr	Texas State	Houston, TX
G	8	Kobe Sanders	6 ft 9 in (2.06 m)	207 lb (94 kg)	GS	Cal Poly	San Diego, CA
C	10	Yuto Yamanouchi-Williams	6 ft 10 in (2.08 m)	230 lb (104 kg)	Jr	Portland	Aizuwakamatsu, Japan
F	11	Nick Davidson	6 ft 10 in (2.08 m)	238 lb (108 kg)	RS Jr	Mater Dei HS	Santa Ana, CA
F	12	Jeriah Coleman	7 ft 1 in (2.16 m)	248 lb (112 kg)	Sr	Clarendon College	Anchorage, AK
G	15	Jordan Malmlov (W)	6 ft 0 in (1.83 m)	146 lb (66 kg)	So	Prescott HS	Prescott, WI
G	20	Daniel Foster	6 ft 6 in (1.98 m)	215 lb (98 kg)	GS	Golden State Prep	Melbourne, Australia
F	21	Justin McBride	6 ft 8 in (2.03 m)	238 lb (108 kg)	So	Oklahoma State	Plano, TX
F	42	K. J. Hymes Jr.	6 ft 10 in (2.08 m)	235 lb (107 kg)	GS	Hillcrest Prep	Phoenix, AZ
G	53	Xavier DuSell	6 ft 5 in (1.96 m)	200 lb (91 kg)	GS	Fresno State	Scottsdale, AZ

Head coach

- Steve Alford (Indiana)

Assistant coach(es)

- Craig Neal (Georgia Tech)
- Bill Duany (Indiana)
- Nate Dixon (UNC Wilmington)

Legend

- (C) Team captain
- (S) Suspended
- (I) Ineligible
- (W) Walk-on
- Injured
- Current redshirt

Roster

== Schedule and results ==
Date time, TV	Rank^{#}	Opponent^{#}	Result	Record	High points	High rebounds	High assists	Site (attendance) city, state
Non-conference regular season
November 4, 2024*; 7:00 p.m., KNSN/MW Network		Sam Houston	W 91−75	1−0	27 – Sanders	10 – Davidson	8 – T. Coleman	Lawlor Events Center (8,023); Reno, NV
November 9, 2024*; 7:00 p.m., KNSN/MW Network		Washington	W 63–53	2–0	20 – Sanders	9 – Davidson	5 – Sanders	Lawlor Events Center (8,806); Reno, NV
November 13, 2024*; 7:00 p.m., KNSN/MW Network		Weber State	W 88–58	3–0	17 – DuSell	6 – Hymes	6 – Tied	Lawlor Events Center (7,312); Reno, NV
November 16, 2024*; 7:00 p.m., KNSN/MW Network		Santa Clara	W 85–59	4–0	21 – T. Coleman	8 – Tied	4 – Tied	Lawlor Events Center (8,772); Reno, NV
November 21, 2024*; 4:30 p.m., ESPNU		vs. Vanderbilt; Charleston Classic quarterfinals	L 71–73	4–1	13 – Tied	9 – Davidson	6 – T. Coleman	TD Arena (2,291); Charleston, SC
November 22, 2024*; 5:30 p.m., ESPN+		vs. VCU; Charleston Classic consolation round	W 64–61	5–1	15 – Davidson	5 – Tied	4 – Tied	TD Arena (2,823); Charleston, SC
November 24, 2024*; 12:00 p.m., ESPN		vs. Oklahoma State; Charleston Classic 5th Place Game	W 90–78	6–1	27 – Sanders	6 – Tied	8 – T. Coleman	TD Arena (2,063); Charleston, SC
December 2, 2024*; 7:00 p.m., KNSN/MW Network		Washington State	L 57–68	6–2	14 – Sanders	8 – Davidson	4 – Sanders	Lawlor Events Center (7,748); Reno, NV
December 7, 2024*; 6:00 p.m., ESPN+		at Loyola Marymount	L 64–68	6–3	13 – Tied	8 – T. Coleman	4 – Sanders	Gersten Pavilion (1,370); Los Angeles, CA
December 11, 2024*; 7:00 p.m., KNSN/MW Network		South Dakota State	W 77–63	7–3	16 – Davidson	8 – Love	7 – Sanders	Lawlor Events Center (7,440); Reno, NV
December 14, 2024*; 7:00 p.m., KNSN/MW Network		Texas Southern	W 105–73	8–3	25 – DuSell	5 – Tied	7 – Tied	Lawlor Events Center (7,512); Reno, NV
Mountain West regular season
December 21, 2024; 2:00 p.m., KNSN/MW Network		Colorado State	L 64–66	8–4 (0–1)	13 – Tied	8 – McBride	6 – Sanders	Lawlor Events Center; Reno, NV
December 28, 2024; 1:00 p.m.		at Wyoming	L 63–66	8–5 (0–2)	15 – Tied	6 – Davidson	5 – T. Coleman	Arena-Auditorium (4,352); Laramie, WY
December 31, 2024; 7:00 p.m., KNSN/MW Network		Utah State	L 64–69	8–6 (0–3)	16 – Davidson	12 – Davidson	6 – T. Coleman	Lawlor Events Center (7,528); Reno, NV
January 3, 2025; 8:00 p.m., FS1		at New Mexico	L 81–82 ^{OT}	8–7 (0–4)	21 – Sanders	7 – Foster	4 – Tied	The Pit (14,622); Albuquerque, NM
January 11, 2025; 4:00 p.m., MW Network		at Fresno State	W 77–66 ^{OT}	9–7 (1–4)	20 – Davidson	14 – Davidson	5 – T. Coleman	Save Mart Center (5,231); Fresno, CA
January 14, 2025; 7:00 p.m., KNSN/MW Network		Air Force	W 68–62	10–7 (2–4)	18 – T. Coleman	9 – Tied	5 – Sanders	Lawlor Events Center (7,430); Reno, NV
January 18, 2025; 3:00 p.m., KNSN/MW Network		San José State	W 75–64	11–7 (3–4)	23 – Davidson	7 – Davidson	8 – Sanders	Lawlor Events Center (7,798); Reno, NV
January 22, 2025; 6:00 p.m., FS1		at Utah State	L 69–90	11–8 (3–5)	19 – Davidson	6 – Foster	5 – Tied	Smith Spectrum (9,797); Logan, UT
January 25, 2025; 7:00 p.m., CBSSN		San Diego State	L 50–69	11–9 (3–6)	13 – McBride	8 – Sanders	3 – T. Coleman	Lawlor Events Center (9,058); Reno, NV
January 29, 2025; 7:00 p.m., CBSSN		at Boise State	L 56–66	11–10 (3–7)	18 – Davidson	4 – Tied	4 – Foster	ExtraMile Arena (9,788); Boise, ID
February 1, 2025; 8:00 p.m., CBSSN		UNLV	W 71–65	12–10 (4–7)	14 – Davidson	6 – Davidson	4 – Foster	Lawlor Events Center (11,008); Reno, NV
February 4, 2025; 6:00 p.m., KNSN/MW Network		at Air Force	W 74–60	13–10 (5–7)	25 – Davidson	6 – Love	4 – Foster	Clune Arena (2,134); Colorado Springs, CO
February 10, 2025; 8:00 p.m., FS1		Fresno State	W 94–69	14–10 (6–7)	25 – Davidson	8 – McBride	10 – Sanders	Lawlor Events Center (7,146); Reno, NV
February 14, 2025; 7:00 p.m., FS1		at San José State	W 73–58	15–10 (7–7)	18 – Sanders	7 – Davidson	9 – Sanders	Provident Credit Union Event Center (2,882); San Jose, CA
February 18, 2025; 6:00 p.m.		at Colorado State	L 71–79	15–11 (7–8)	22 – Davidson	7 – Davidson	3 – Sanders	Moby Arena (4,720); Fort Collins, CO
February 22, 2025; 3:00 p.m., FS1		Boise State	L 69–70	15–12 (7–9)	30 – Sanders	7 – Rolison	7 – Rolison	Lawlor Events Center (10,521); Reno, NV
February 25, 2025; 7:00 p.m., KNSN/MW Network		Wyoming	W 84–61	16–12 (8–9)	27 – Sanders	9 – McBride	5 – Rolison	Lawlor Events Center (7,563); Reno, NV
February 28, 2025; 8:00 p.m., FS1		at UNLV	L 55–68	16–13 (8–10)	30 – Sanders	8 – Davidson	4 – Davidson	Thomas & Mack Center (7,466); Paradise, NV
March 4, 2025; 6:00 p.m., CBSSN		New Mexico	L 67–71	16–14 (8–11)	15 – Tied	7 – Davidson	6 – Tied	Lawlor Events Center (7,881); Reno, NV
March 8, 2025; 7:30 p.m., FS1		at San Diego State	L 61–80	16–15 (8–12)	19 – Rolison	8 – Rolison	4 – Davidson	Viejas Arena; San Diego, CA
Mountain West tournament
March 12, 2025; 1:30 p.m., MW Network	(7)	vs. (10) Fresno State; First round	W 86–71	17–15	17 – Sanders	11 – Davidson	10 – Sanders	Thomas & Mack Center; Paradise, NV
March 13, 2025; 6:00 p.m., CBSSN	(7)	vs. (2) Colorado State; Quarterfinal	L 59–67	17–16	23 – Sanders	7 – Sanders	3 – Tied	Thomas & Mack Center; Paradise, NV
*Non-conference game. ^{#}Rankings from AP Poll. (#) Tournament seedings in parentheses. All times are in Pacific Time.

== Rankings ==
Ranking movements Legend: ██ Increase in ranking ██ Decrease in ranking — = Not ranked RV = Received votes
	Week																				
Poll	Pre	1	2	3	4	5	6	7	8	9	10	11	12	13	14	15	16	17	18	19	Final
AP	—	—	—	RV	—	—	—	—	—	—	—	—	—	—	—	—	—	—	—	—	—
Coaches	—	RV	RV	RV	RV	—	—	—	—	—	—	—	—	—	—	—	—	—	—	—	—
