= Atiki Ally Atiki =

Tanzanian basketball player

No. 33 – Dar City BC
- Position: Power forward
- League: NBL

Personal information
- Born: January 12, 2001 (age 25) Mwanza, Tanzania
- Listed height: 6 ft 10 in (2.08 m)
- Listed weight: 216 lb (98 kg)

Career information
- High school: London Basketball Academy (London, Ontario)
- College: BYU (2021–2024); New Mexico (2024–2025)
- Playing career: 2025–present

Career history
- 2025–present: Dar City BC

Atiki Ally Atiki (born 12 January 2001) is a Tanzanian college basketball player currently playing for Dar City BC of the Tanzanian National Basketball League. During Atiki's collegiate career, he played for the New Mexico Lobos and the BYU Cougars.

== Career statistics ==
Legend
GP	Games played	GS	Games started	MPG	Minutes per game
FG%	Field goal percentage	3P%	3-point field goal percentage	FT%	Free throw percentage
RPG	Rebounds per game	APG	Assists per game	SPG	Steals per game
BPG	Blocks per game	PPG	Points per game	**Bold**	Career high

=== College ===
Year	Team	GP	GS	MPG	FG%	3P%	FT%	RPG	APG	SPG	BPG	PPG
2021–22	BYU	32	**3**	10.7	.579	-	.474	2.9	.3	.0	.8	3.0
2022–23	BYU	**33**	1	**14.4**	.511	.000	**.686**	**3.6**	**.5**	**.4**	**1.1**	3.8
2023–24	BYU	23	0	11.0	**.621**	.000	.458	2.9	.3	.3	.5	**4.0**
2024–25	New Mexico	32	0	8.2	.574	–	.450	2.5	.3	.3	.8	2.0
Career		120	4	11.1	.567	.000	.561	3.0	.4	.3	.8	3.2
