= 2024–25 San Jose State Spartans men's basketball team =

American college basketball season

2024–25 San Jose State Spartans men's basketball

Ball Dawgs Classic Champions

NIT, First Round
- Conference: Mountain West Conference
- Record: 15–20 (7–13 MW)
- Head coach: Tim Miles (4th season)
- Assistant coaches: Damany Hendrix; Jeff Strohm; Ed Gipson
- Home arena: Provident Credit Union Event Center (Capacity: 5,000)

2024–25 Mountain West Conference men's basketball standings
	Conf.				Overall
Team	W		L	PCT	W		L	PCT
New Mexico	17	–	3	.850	27	–	8	.771
Colorado State †	16	–	4	.800	26	–	10	.722
Utah State	15	–	5	.750	26	–	8	.765
San Diego State	14	–	6	.700	21	–	10	.677
Boise State	14	–	6	.700	26	–	11	.703
UNLV	11	–	9	.550	18	–	15	.545
Nevada	8	–	12	.400	17	–	16	.515
San Jose State	7	–	13	.350	15	–	20	.429
Wyoming	5	–	15	.250	12	–	20	.375
Fresno State	2	–	18	.100	6	–	26	.188
Air Force	1	–	19	.050	4	–	28	.125
† 2025 Mountain West tournament winner

The 2024–25 San Jose State Spartans men's basketball team represented San Jose State University during the 2024–25 NCAA Division I men's basketball season. The Spartans, led by fourth-year head coach Tim Miles, played their games at Provident Credit Union Event Center as members of the Mountain West Conference.

== Previous season ==
The Spartans finished the season 9–23, 2–16 in conference play to finish in tenth place. They were defeated by Colorado State in the quarterfinals of the Mountain West Conference tournament.

== Offseason ==
=== Departures ===
Name	Number	Pos.	Height	Weight	Year	Hometown	Reason for departure
M. J. Amey Jr.	0	SG	6'2"	185	Junior	Vacaville, CA	Transferred to Loyola Marymount
Garrett Anderson	1	SF	6'6"	185	Sophomore	Phoenix, AZ	Transferred to Central Washington
Alvaro Cardenas	13	SG	6'1"	180	Junior	Granada, Spain	Transferred to Boise State
Tibet Görener	5	SF	6'8"	195	RS Junior	Istanbul, Turkey	Transferred to SMU
William Humor	21	G	6'10"	228	Sophomore	Sollentuna, Sweden	Transferred to Northern Colorado
Ricky Mitchell Jr.	2	CG	6'4"	172	Freshman	Aurora, CO	Entered transfer portal
Diogo Seixas	23	SG	6'8"	235	Freshman	Lisbon, Portugal	Entered transfer portal

=== Incoming transfers ===
Name	Number	Pos.	Height	Weight	Year	Hometown	Previous college
Sadaidriene Hall	6	PF	6'5"	210	Graduate	Sulphur Springs, TX	Stephen F. Austin
Chol Marial	15	C	7'2"	230	Graduate	Rumbek, South Sudan	Oregon State
Will McClendon	1	SG	6'3"	195	RS Sophomore	Sacramento, CA	UCLA
Sadraque NgaNga	24	PF	6'10"	210	Junior	Luanda, Angola	Seton Hall
Josh Uduje	4	SG	6'5"	190	Sophomore	Dakar, Senegal	Utah State
Donovan Yap	0	SG	6'5"	175	Graduate	Las Vegas, NV	Fresno State

=== 2024 recruiting class ===
College recruiting
Name	Hometown	School	Height	Weight	Commit date
Ben Roseborough; SG	Sacramento, CA	Bella Vista Prep	6 ft 4 in (1.93 m)	205 lb (93 kg)	Dec 13, 2023
Ben Roseborough; SG	Recruit ratings: Scout: Rivals: 247Sports: ESPN: (NR)				
Cameron Patterson; SG	Humble, TX		6 ft 5 in (1.96 m)	180 lb (82 kg)	Sep 11, 2023
Cameron Patterson; SG	Recruit ratings: Scout: Rivals: 247Sports: ESPN: (NR)				
Jermaine Washington; PG	Moreno Valley, CA	Rancho Verde HS	6 ft 0 in (1.83 m)	185 lb (84 kg)	Sep 19, 2023
Jermaine Washington; PG	Recruit ratings: Scout: Rivals: 247Sports: ESPN: (NR)				
Overall recruit ranking: Scout: – Rivals: –
Note: In many cases, Scout, Rivals, 247Sports, On3, and ESPN may conflict in their listings of height and weight.; In these cases, the average was taken. ESPN grades are on a 100-point scale.; Sources: "2024 San Jose State Basketball Recruiting Commits". Scout.; "Scout.com Team Recruiting Rankings". Scout.; "2024 Team Ranking". Rivals.

== Roster ==
2024–25 San Jose State Spartans men's basketball team
Players
Coaches

Pos.	#	Name	Height	Weight	Year	Previous school	Hometown
G	0	Donovan Yap Jr.	6 ft 5 in (1.96 m)	175 lb (79 kg)	GS	Arbor View HS; Fresno State	Las Vegas, Nevada
G	1	Will McClendon	6 ft 3 in (1.91 m)	195 lb (88 kg)	RS So	Bishop Gorman HS; UCLA	Sacramento, California
C	4	Adrame Diongue	7 ft 0 in (2.13 m)	200 lb (91 kg)	Jr	Arizona Compass Prep; Washington State	Dakar, Senegal
F	5	Latrell Davis	6 ft 3 in (1.91 m)	210 lb (95 kg)	So	First Baptist Academy (FL)	Leeds, England
F	6	Sadaidriene Hall	6 ft 5 in (1.96 m)	210 lb (95 kg)	GS	Sulphur Springs HS; Stephen F. Austin	Sulphur Springs, Texas
G	7	Pasha Goodarzi	6 ft 3 in (1.91 m)	200 lb (91 kg)	RS Fr	Valley Christian HS	Los Gatos, California
G	8	Cameron Patterson	6 ft 5 in (1.96 m)	180 lb (82 kg)	Fr	Houston, Texas
G	9	Josh Uduje	6 ft 5 in (1.96 m)	190 lb (86 kg)	Sr	Compass Prep; Utah State	London, England
F	11	Ben Roseborough	6 ft 4 in (1.93 m)	205 lb (93 kg)	RS Fr	Bella Vista Prep	Sacramento, California
G	13	Jermaine Washington	6 ft 0 in (1.83 m)	185 lb (84 kg)	Fr	Rancho Verde HS	Hemet, California
C	15	Chol Marial	7 ft 2 in (2.18 m)	230 lb (104 kg)	GS	Compass Prep; Oregon State	Rumbek, South Sudan
F	20	Christian Wise	6 ft 6 in (1.98 m)	205 lb (93 kg)	RS So	Archbishop Riordan HS	San Francisco, California
F	22	Robert Vaihola	6 ft 8 in (2.03 m)	260 lb (118 kg)	RS Jr	Archbishop Riordan HS; Fresno State	San Mateo, California
G	23	Ameere Britton	6 ft 2 in (1.88 m)	196 lb (89 kg)	Jr	Elk Grove HS (CA); Cal State Monterey Bay	Sacramento, California
F	24	Sadraque NgaNga	6 ft 10 in (2.08 m)	220 lb (100 kg)	Jr	Compass Prep; Seton Hall	Luanda, Angola
G	33	Steven Vasquez	6 ft 2 in (1.88 m)	188 lb (85 kg)	Sr	St. Joseph HS; Fresno State	Santa Maria, California

Head coach

- Tim Miles (Mary)

Assistant coach(es)

- Damany Hendrix (Lamar)
- Jeff Strohm (Eastern Illinois)
- Ed Gipson (Calumet College)

Legend

- (C) Team captain
- (S) Suspended
- (I) Ineligible
- (W) Walk-on
- Injured
- Current redshirt

Roster

== Schedule and results ==
Date time, TV	Rank^{#}	Opponent^{#}	Result	Record	High points	High rebounds	High assists	Site (attendance) city, state
Exhibition
October 29, 2024*; 7:00 p.m.		Cal State East Bay	W 75–61	–	25 – Uduje	16 – Vaihola	4 – Yap Jr.	Provident Credit Union Event Center (1,023); San Jose, CA
Regular season
November 4, 2024*; 7:00 p.m., MW Network		Western Illinois	L 55−59	0−1	13 – Tied	7 – Vaihola	3 – Vaihola	Provident Credit Union Event Center (1,876); San Jose, CA
November 8, 2024*; 7:30 p.m., ESPN+		vs. Pacific; Outrigger Rainbow Classic	L 67–80	0–2	15 – Uduje	5 – Tied	2 – Tied	Stan Sheriff Center; Honolulu, HI
November 10, 2024*; 8:00 p.m., ESPN+		at Hawaii; Outrigger Rainbow Classic	L 69–80	0–3	16 – Yap Jr.	7 – Marial	2 – Tied	Stan Sheriff Center (4,580); Honolulu, HI
November 11, 2024*; 7:30 p.m.		vs. Life Pacific; Outrigger Rainbow Classic	W 93–56	1–3	29 – NgaNga	12 – NgaNga	4 – Tied	Stan Sheriff Center; Honolulu, HI
November 17, 2024*; 2:00 p.m., MW Network		UC Santa Barbara	L 59–64	1–4	22 – Uduje	9 – Vaihola	4 – Yap Jr.	Provident Credit Union Event Center (1,817); San Jose, CA
November 20, 2024*; 7:00 p.m., Peacock		at USC	L 68–82	1–5	25 – Uduje	9 – Vaihola	5 – Vaihola	Galen Center (3,186); Los Angeles, CA
November 25, 2024*; 5:30 p.m., FloSports		vs. UTEP; Ball Dawgs Classic	W 71–65	2–5	23 – Uduje	6 – Vaihola	7 – Yap Jr.	Lee's Family Forum (104); Henderson, NV
November 26, 2024*; 8:00 p.m., FloSports		vs. UNC Greensboro; Ball Dawgs Classic	W 69–64	3–5	14 – Yap Jr.	5 – Tied	5 – McClendon	Lee's Family Forum; Henderson, NV
November 27, 2024*; 7:00 p.m., FloSports		vs. Long Beach State; Ball Dawgs Classic	W 82–66	4–5	18 – Yap Jr.	6 – Vaihola	5 – McClendon	Lee's Family Forum; Henderson, NV
December 4, 2024; 6:00 p.m., MW Network		at New Mexico	L 77–83	4–6 (0–1)	22 – Uduje	11 – Vaihola	4 – Yap Jr.	The Pit (10,658); Albuquerque, NM
December 9, 2024*; 7:00 p.m., MW Network		Lincoln (CA)	W 117–80	5–6	21 – Uduje	18 – Vaihola	8 – Davis	Provident Credit Union Event Center (1,659); San Jose, CA
December 14, 2024*; 7:00 p.m., MW Network		Cal Poly	W 107–100 ^{OT}	6–6	33 – Hall	11 – Hall	4 – Hall	Provident Credit Union Event Center (2,134); San Jose, CA
December 21, 2024*; 7:30 p.m., MW Network		Kennesaw State	W 89–65	7–6	22 – Uduje	14 – Hall	5 – Yap Jr.	Provident Credit Union Event Center (1,767); San Jose, CA
December 28, 2024; 2:00 p.m., MW Network		Boise State	L 71–73	7–7 (0–2)	22 – Uduje	8 – Vaihola	2 – Tied	Provident Credit Union Event Center (1,767); San Jose, CA
December 31, 2024; 2:00 p.m., MW Network		Colorado State	L 50–72	7–8 (0–3)	15 – McClendon	6 – Davis	2 – Tied	Provident Credit Union Event Center (1,425); San Jose, CA
January 4, 2025; 3:00 p.m., MW Network		at UNLV	L 73–79	7–9 (0–4)	18 – Uduje	11 – NgaNga	4 – McClendon	Thomas & Mack Center (5,182); Paradise, NV
January 7, 2025; 7:00 p.m., MW Network		No. 25 Utah State	L 78–85	7–10 (0–5)	22 – Yap	11 – Vaihola	8 – McClendon	Provident Credit Union Event Center (1,668); San Jose, CA
January 11, 2025; 12:00 p.m., MW Network		at Air Force	W 69–62	8–10 (1–5)	20 – McClendon	9 – Marial	5 – Yap Jr.	Clune Arena (1,545); Colorado Springs, CO
January 14, 2025; 7:00 p.m., MW Network		New Mexico	W 71–70	9–10 (2–5)	18 – Vaihola	9 – Vaihola	5 – McClendon	Provident Credit Union Event Center (1,853); San Jose, CA
January 18, 2025; 3:00 p.m., MW Network		at Nevada	L 64–75	9–11 (2–6)	12 – Tied	6 – Vaihola	3 – Tied	Lawlor Events Center (7,798); Reno, NV
January 25, 2025; 2:00 p.m., MW Network		Wyoming	W 67–58	10–11 (3–6)	22 – Davis	10 – McClendon	5 – Vaihola	Provident Credit Union Event Center (2,585); San Jose, CA
January 28, 2025; 7:30 p.m., FS1		at San Diego State	L 68–71	10–12 (3–7)	23 – Davis	9 – Hall	4 – Hall	Viejas Arena (12,414); San Diego, CA
February 1, 2025; 2:00 p.m., NBCSBA		Air Force	W 75–64	11–12 (4–7)	24 – Uduje	8 – Vaihola	5 – Vaihola	Provident Credit Union Event Center (2,037); San Jose, CA
February 4, 2025; 7:00 p.m., MW Network		at Fresno State	W 94–91 ^{2OT}	12–12 (5–7)	30 – Tied	9 – Uduje	4 – Tied	Save Mart Center (4,257); Fresno, CA
February 7, 2025; 6:00 p.m., FS1		at Boise State	L 52–79	12–13 (5–8)	14 – Davis	7 – Vaihola	2 – Tied	ExtraMile Arena (10,738); Boise, ID
February 11, 2025; 8:00 p.m., CBSSN		San Diego State	L 66–69	12–14 (5–9)	21 – Davis	9 – Vaihola	5 – Vaihola	Provident Credit Union Event Center (4,287); San Jose, CA
February 14, 2025; 7:00 p.m., FS1		Nevada	L 58–73	12–15 (5–10)	17 – Davis	10 – Vaihola	5 – Yap Jr.	Provident Credit Union Event Center (2,882); San Jose, CA
February 19, 2025; 6:00 p.m., MW Network		at Utah State	L 57–105	12–16 (5–11)	15 – NgaNga	6 – Uduje	5 – Davis	Smith Spectrum (8,921); Logan, UT
February 22, 2025; 1:00 p.m., MW Network		at Wyoming	W 82–73	13–16 (6–11)	29 – Uduje	8 – Davis	4 – Yap Jr.	Arena-Auditorium (3,924); Laramie, WY
February 25, 2025; 7:00 p.m., NBCSCA		UNLV	L 71–77	13–17 (6–12)	27 – Uduje	7 – Uduje	5 – Yap	Provident Credit Union Event Center (2,339); San Jose, CA
March 4, 2025; 6:00 p.m., MW Network		Colorado State	L 56–83	13–18 (6–13)	16 – NgaNga	7 – Hall	3 – Tied	Moby Arena (6,021); Fort Collins, CO
March 8, 2025; 2:00 p.m., NBCSCA		Fresno State	W 92–68	14–18 (7–13)	30 – Yap Jr.	19 – Vaihola	7 – Davis	Provident Credit Union Event Center (2,793); San Jose, CA
Mountain West tournament
March 12, 2025; 11:00 a.m., MW Network	(8)	vs. (9) Wyoming; First Round	W 66−61	15–18	19 – Yap	9 – Vaihola	3 – Yap	Thomas & Mack Center; Paradise, NV
March 13, 2025; 12:00 p.m., CBSSN	(8)	vs. (1) New Mexico; Quarterfinal	L 52−63	15–19	13 – Hall	11 – Vaihola	3 – Vaihola	Thomas & Mack Center; Paradise, NV
NIT
March 19, 2025*; 8:00 p.m., ESPN2	(4)	Loyola Chicago; First Round – San Francisco Region	L 70−73	15–20	18 – Uduje	9 – Vaihola	3 – Vaihola	Provident Credit Union Event Center (3,627); San Jose, CA
*Non-conference game. ^{#}Rankings from AP Poll. (#) Tournament seedings in parentheses. All times are in Pacific Time.
