= 2024–25 Colorado State Rams men's basketball team =

American college basketball season

2024–25 Colorado State Rams men's basketball

Mountain West tournament champions

NCAA tournament, Second Round
- Conference: Mountain West Conference
- Record: 26–10 (16–4 MW)
- Head coach: Niko Medved (7th season)
- Assistant coaches: Ali Farokhmanesh; Brian Cooley; Tim Shelton
- Home arena: Moby Arena

2024–25 Mountain West Conference men's basketball standings
	Conf.				Overall
Team	W		L	PCT	W		L	PCT
New Mexico	17	–	3	.850	27	–	8	.771
Colorado State †	16	–	4	.800	26	–	10	.722
Utah State	15	–	5	.750	26	–	8	.765
San Diego State	14	–	6	.700	21	–	10	.677
Boise State	14	–	6	.700	26	–	11	.703
UNLV	11	–	9	.550	18	–	15	.545
Nevada	8	–	12	.400	17	–	16	.515
San Jose State	7	–	13	.350	15	–	20	.429
Wyoming	5	–	15	.250	12	–	20	.375
Fresno State	2	–	18	.100	6	–	26	.188
Air Force	1	–	19	.050	4	–	28	.125
† 2025 Mountain West tournament winner

The 2024–25 Colorado State Rams men's basketball team represented Colorado State University during the 2024–25 NCAA Division I men's basketball season. The Rams were led by seventh-year head coach Niko Medved and played their home games for the 59th season at Moby Arena in Fort Collins, Colorado. They participated as members of the Mountain West Conference for the 26th season. They finished the season 26–10, 16–4 in Mountain West play to finish in second place. They defeated Nevada, Utah State, and Boise State to win the Mountain West tournament championship. As a result, they received the conference's automatic bid to the NCAA tournament as the No. 12 seed in the West region. They defeated Memphis before losing to Maryland in the second round.

On March 25, 2025, head coach Niko Medved left the team to take the head coaching position at Minnesota. On March 26, the school named assistant Ali Farokhmanesh the team's new head coach.

== Previous season ==
The Rams finished the 2023–24 season 25–11, 10–8 in Mountain West play to finish in a tie for sixth place. They defeated San Jose State in the first round of the Mountain West Tournament and Nevada in the quarterfinals before losing to New Mexico in the semifinals. They received an at-large bid to the NCAA tournament as the No. 10 seed in the Midwest Region where they defeated Virginia in the First Four before losing to Texas in the first round.

== Offseason ==
=== Departures ===
Name	Num	Pos.	Height	Weight	Year	Hometown	Reason for departure
Joel Scott	1	F	6'7"	225	GS Senior	Monument, CO	Graduated
Taviontae Jackson	2	G	6'2"	165	Sophomore	Las Vegas, NV	Transferred to Southern Utah
Josiah Strong	3	G	6'4"	195	GS Senior	Brooklyn Park, MN	Graduated
Isaiah Stevens	4	G	6'0"	185	GS Senior	Allen, TX	Graduated/undrafted in 2024 NBA draft; signed with the Miami Heat
Jack Payne	11	F	6'6"	195	(redshirt) Freshman	Boise, ID	Transferred to Idaho
Patrick Cartier	12	F	6'8"	220	GS Senior	Brookfield, WI	Graduated
Javanté Johnson	13	G	6'6"	215	(redshirt) Senior	Colorado Springs, CO	Transferred to California Baptist
Joe Palmer	20	F	6'4"	190	GS Senior	Faribault, MN	Graduated
Cam Lowe	22	G	6'5"	182	Freshman	Monument, CO	Walk-on; transferred to Black Hills State
Kyle Evans	32	F	6'10"	200	Sophomore	Aliso Viejo, CA	Transferred to UC Irvine

=== Incoming transfers ===
Name	Num	Pos.	Height	Weight	Year	Hometown	Previous School
Jaylen Crocker-Johnson	8	F	6'8"	230	Sophomore	San Antonio, TX	Little Rock
Keshawn Williams	11	G	6'4"	175	GS Senior	Chicago Heights, IL	Southern Illinois
Bowen Born	13	G	5'11"	170	GS Senior	Norwalk, IA	Northern Iowa
Nikola Djapa	23	F	7'0"	230	Sophomore	Belgrade, Serbia	LIU
Ethan Morton	25	G	6'7"	215	GS Senior	Butler, PA	Purdue
Charlie Dortch	30	F	6'9"	235	(redshirt) Freshman	Fort Collins, CO	Walk-on; Fort Lewis

=== Recruiting classes ===
==== 2024 recruiting class ====
College recruiting information
Name	Hometown	School	Height	Weight	Commit date
Jaden Steppe #34 PF	Tualatin, OR	Tualatin High School	6 ft 6 in (1.98 m)	200 lb (91 kg)	Sep 25, 2023
Jaden Steppe #34 PF	Recruit ratings: Rivals: 247Sports: ESPN: (80)				
Jonathan Mekonnen; SF	Saint Paul, MN	Eastview Senior High School	6 ft 7 in (2.01 m)	185 lb (84 kg)	Jul 27, 2023
Jonathan Mekonnen; SF	Recruit ratings: Rivals: 247Sports: ESPN: (NR)				
Darnez Slater; PG	Corona, CA	Eleanor Roosevelt High School	6 ft 3 in (1.91 m)	165 lb (75 kg)	Jul 11, 2023
Darnez Slater; PG	Recruit ratings: Rivals: 247Sports: ESPN: (NR)				
Kyle Jorgensen; C	Minneapolis, MN	Washburn High School	6 ft 9 in (2.06 m)	N/A	Jun 26, 2023
Kyle Jorgensen; C	Recruit ratings: Rivals: 247Sports: ESPN: (NR)				
Overall recruit ranking: Scout: – Rivals: –
Note: In many cases, Scout, Rivals, 247Sports, On3, and ESPN may conflict in their listings of height and weight.; In these cases, the average was taken. ESPN grades are on a 100-point scale.; Sources: "Colorado State Commit List for 2024". Rivals.; "Men's Basketball Recruiting". Scout.; "ESPN – Colorado State Rams Basketball Recruiting 2024". ESPN.; "Scout.com Team Recruiting Rankings". Scout.; "2024 Team Ranking". Rivals.

==== 2025 recruiting class ====
College recruiting information (2025)
Name	Hometown	School	Height	Weight	Commit date
Docker Tedeschi; SF	Benton, IL	Benton Consolidated High School	6 ft 8 in (2.03 m)	175 lb (79 kg)	Jun 25, 2024
Docker Tedeschi; SF	Recruit ratings: Rivals: 247Sports: ESPN: (NR)				
Overall recruit ranking: Scout: – Rivals: –
Note: In many cases, Scout, Rivals, 247Sports, On3, and ESPN may conflict in their listings of height and weight.; In these cases, the average was taken. ESPN grades are on a 100-point scale.; Sources: "Colorado State Commit List for 2025". Rivals.; "Men's Basketball Recruiting". Scout.; "ESPN – Colorado State Rams Basketball Recruiting 2025". ESPN.; "Scout.com Team Recruiting Rankings". Scout.; "2025 Team Ranking". Rivals.

== Roster ==
2024–25 Colorado State Rams men's basketball team
Players
Coaches

Pos.	#	Name	Height	Weight	Year	Previous school	Hometown
G	0	Kyan Evans	6 ft 2 in (1.88 m)	175 lb (79 kg)	So	Staley HS	Kansas City, MO
G	3	Darnez Slater	6 ft 3 in (1.91 m)	175 lb (79 kg)	Fr	Eleanor Roosevelt HS	Eastvale, CA
F	5	Jon Mekonnen	6 ft 8 in (2.03 m)	195 lb (88 kg)	Fr	Eastview HS	Eagan, MN
F	8	Jaylen Crocker-Johnson	6 ft 8 in (2.03 m)	230 lb (104 kg)	So	Little Rock	San Antonio, TX
G	10	Nique Clifford	6 ft 6 in (1.98 m)	200 lb (91 kg)	GS	Colorado	Colorado Springs, CO
G	11	Keshawn Williams	6 ft 4 in (1.93 m)	175 lb (79 kg)	GS	Southern Illinois	Chicago Heights, IL
G	13	Bowen Born	5 ft 11 in (1.8 m)	170 lb (77 kg)	GS	Northern Iowa	Norwalk, IA
G	14	Luke Murphy (W)	6 ft 2 in (1.88 m)	170 lb (77 kg)	RS So	Southern California Academy	Calabasas, CA
G	15	Jalen Lake	6 ft 4 in (1.93 m)	190 lb (86 kg)	Sr	Waxahachie HS	Waxachachie, TX
G	21	Rashaan Mbemba	6 ft 7 in (2.01 m)	250 lb (113 kg)	So	Borgi St. Polten	Vienna, Austria
F	23	Nikola Djapa	6 ft 11 in (2.11 m)	235 lb (107 kg)	So	LIU	Belgrade, Serbia
G	25	Ethan Morton	6 ft 7 in (2.01 m)	215 lb (98 kg)	GS	Purdue	Butler, PA
F	30	Charlie Dortch (W)	6 ft 7 in (2.01 m)	235 lb (107 kg)	RS Fr	Fort Lewis	Fort Collins, CO
F	35	Kyle Jorgensen	6 ft 9 in (2.06 m)	225 lb (102 kg)	Fr	Washburn HS	Minneapolis, MN
F	44	Jaden Steppe	6 ft 8 in (2.03 m)	220 lb (100 kg)	Fr	Tualatin HS	Tualatin, OR

Head coach

- Niko Medved (Minnesota)

Assistant coach(es)

- Ali Farokhmanesh (Northern Iowa)
- Brian Cooley (Nebraska Wesleyan)
- Tim Shelton (San Diego State)

Legend

- (C) Team captain
- (S) Suspended
- (I) Ineligible
- (W) Walk-on
- Injured
- Current redshirt

Roster

== Schedule and results ==
Date time, TV	Rank^{#}	Opponent^{#}	Result	Record	High points	High rebounds	High assists	Site (attendance) city, state
Exhibition
October 30, 2024*; 7:00 p.m.		Adams State	W 90–74		23 – Clifford	7 – Clifford	6 – Clifford	Moby Arena (3,417); Fort Collins, CO
Non-conference regular season
November 4, 2024*; 7:30 p.m., MW Network		North Dakota	W 82−56	1−0	20 – Clifford	14 – Clifford	7 – Born	Moby Arena (4,060); Fort Collins, CO
November 8, 2024*; 7:30 p.m., MW Network		Tennessee State	W 87–79 ^{OT}	2–0	31 – Clifford	13 – Clifford	5 – Evans	Moby Arena (4,866); Fort Collins, CO
November 12, 2024*; 7:00 p.m., MW Network		Denver	W 74–65	3–0	19 – Lake	9 – Clifford	3 – Tied	Moby Arena (4,000); Fort Collins, CO
November 16, 2024*; 2:00 p.m., SECN+/ESPN+		vs. No. 25 Ole Miss	L 69–84	3–1	21 – Lake	7 – Clifford	5 – Clifford	Landers Center (1,652); Southaven, MS
November 22, 2024*; 7:00 p.m., MW Network		UC Riverside; Acrisure Invitational campus site game	L 75–77 ^{OT}	3–2	21 – Crocker-Johnson	7 – Tied	6 – Morton	Moby Arena (4,713); Fort Collins, CO
November 28, 2024*; 4:30 p.m., TruTV		vs. Washington; Acrisure Invitational semifinals	L 67–73	3–3	13 – Clifford	9 – Clifford	3 – Tied	Acrisure Arena (435); Thousand Palms, CA
November 29, 2024*; 12:00 p.m., TruTV		vs. TCU; Acrisure Invitational 3rd place game	W 76–72 ^{OT}	4–3	25 – Clifford	12 – Clifford	6 – Clifford	Acrisure Arena (835); Thousand Palms, CA
December 4, 2024*; 7:00 p.m., MW Network		Loyola Marymount	W 83–54	5–3	19 – Clifford	17 – Clifford	6 – Clifford	Moby Arena (4,247); Fort Collins, CO
December 7, 2024*; 6:00 p.m., ESPN+		at Colorado; Rocky Mountain Showdown	L 55–72	5–4	18 – Lake	8 – Clifford	2 – Tied	CU Events Center (9,143); Boulder, CO
December 14, 2024*; 5:30 p.m., Baller TV		vs. VCU; Jack Jones Classic	L 68–76	5–5	14 – Williams	10 – Clifford	4 – Clifford	Lee's Family Forum; Henderson, NV
December 17, 2024*; 7:00 p.m., MW Network		Radford	W 78–68	6–5	16 – Tied	10 – Clifford	7 – Lake	Moby Arena (3,931); Fort Collins, CO
Mountain West regular season
December 21, 2024; 3:00 p.m., MW Network		at Nevada	W 66–64	7–5 (1–0)	16 – Tied	12 – Clifford	5 – Morton	Lawlor Events Center; Reno, NV
December 28, 2024; 2:00 p.m., MW Network		New Mexico	L 68–76	7–6 (1–1)	17 – Clifford	9 – Crocker-Johnson	6 – Clifford	Moby Arena (4,772); Fort Collins, CO
December 31, 2024; 3:00 p.m., MW Network		at San Jose State	W 72–50	8–6 (2–1)	22 – Clifford	10 – Clifford	5 – Evans	Provident Credit Union Event Center (1,425); San Jose, CA
January 7, 2025; 7:00 p.m., MW Network		Fresno State	W 91–64	9–6 (3–1)	20 – Crocker-Johnson	9 – Clifford	7 – Evans	Moby Arena (3,095); Fort Collins, CO
January 11, 2025; 2:00 p.m., MW Network		UNLV	W 84–62	10–6 (4–1)	22 – Tied	6 – Lake	7 – Clifford	Moby Arena (3,912); Fort Collins, CO
January 14, 2025; 9:00 p.m., CBSSN		at San Diego State	L 60–75	10–7 (4–2)	15 – Lake	6 – Clifford	2 – Tied	Viejas Arena (12,414); San Diego, CA
January 18, 2025; 2:00 p.m., MW Network		at Wyoming; Border War	W 79–63	11–7 (5–2)	23 – Clifford	11 – Clifford	5 – Clifford	Arena-Auditorium (4,941); Laramie, WY
January 22, 2025; 6:00 p.m., CBSSN		Boise State	W 75–72	12–7 (6–2)	20 – Clifford	7 – Clifford	7 – Clifford	Moby Arena (5,244); Fort Collins, CO
January 25, 2025; 5:00 p.m., MW Network		at Fresno State	W 69–64	13–7 (7–2)	24 – Clifford	8 – Clifford	7 – Clifford	Save Mart Center (5,223); Fresno, CA
January 28, 2025; 7:00 p.m., MW Network		Air Force	W 79–58	14–7 (8–2)	22 – Clifford	11 – Clifford	8 – Evans	Moby Arena (4,367); Fort Collins, CO
February 5, 2025; 8:30 p.m., FS1		at New Mexico	L 65–87	14–8 (8–3)	17 – Mbemba	10 – Clifford	5 – Clifford	The Pit (13,436); Albuquerque, NM
February 8, 2025; 8:00 p.m., CBSSN		San Diego State	W 68–63	15–8 (19–3)	21 – Clifford	13 – Clifford	2 – Tied	Moby Arena (8,083); Fort Collins, CO
February 11, 2025; 9:00 p.m., FS1		at Utah State	L 85–93	15–9 (9–4)	24 – Clifford	16 – Clifford	6 – Morton	Smith Spectrum (9,130); Logan, UT
February 15, 2025; 2:00 p.m., MW Network		Wyoming; Border War	W 88–53	16–9 (10–4)	22 – Clifford	11 – Clifford	7 – Morton	Moby Arena (8,083); Fort Collins, CO
February 18, 2025; 7:00 p.m., MW Network		Nevada	W 79–71	17–9 (11–4)	22 – Clifford	10 – Mbemba	5 – Tied	Moby Arena (4,720); Fort Collins, CO
February 22, 2025; 8:00 p.m., CBSSN		at UNLV	W 61–53	18–9 (12–4)	14 – Tied	14 – Clifford	5 – Tied	Thomas & Mack Center (5,817); Paradise, NV
February 25, 2025; 7:00 p.m., MW Network		at Air Force	W 77–55	19–9 (13–4)	20 – Evans	9 – Clifford	5 – Clifford	Clune Arena (2,180); Colorado Springs, CO
March 1, 2025; 2:00 p.m., FS1		Utah State	W 93–66	20–9 (14–4)	26 – Clifford	6 – Clifford	9 – Clifford	Moby Arena (7,155); Fort Collins, CO
March 4, 2025; 7:00 p.m., MW Network		San Jose State	W 83–56	21–9 (15–4)	15 – Clifford	6 – Clifford	7 – Evans	Moby Arena (6,021); Fort Collins, CO
March 7, 2025; 8:00 p.m., FS1		at Boise State	W 83–73	22–9 (16–4)	36 – Clifford	6 – Morton	3 – Clifford	ExtraMile Arena (12,061); Boise, ID
Mountain West tournament
March 13, 2025; 7:00 p.m., CBSSN	(2)	vs. (7) Nevada; Quarterfinals	W 67–59	23–9	25 – Clifford	14 – Clifford	4 – Tied	Thomas & Mack Center; Paradise, NV
March 14, 2025; 9:00 p.m., CBSSN	(2)	vs. (3) Utah State; Semifinals	W 83–72	24–9	26 – Clifford	11 – Clifford	6 – Clifford	Thomas & Mack Center; Paradise, NV
March 15, 2025; 3:00 p.m., CBS	(2)	vs. (5) Boise State; Final	W 69–56	25–9	24 – Clifford	6 – Clifford	4 – Evans	Thomas & Mack Center (4,675); Paradise, NV
NCAA tournament
March 21, 2025; 12:00 p.m., TBS	(12 W)	vs. (5 W) No. 16 Memphis; First Round	W 78–70	26–9	23 – Evans	8 – Clifford	6 – Clifford	Climate Pledge Arena (17,024); Seattle, WA
March 23, 2025; 5:10 p.m., TBS	(12 W)	vs. (4 W) No. 11 Maryland; Second Round	L 71–72	26–10	21 – Clifford	8 – Crocker-Johnson	6 – Clifford	Climate Pledge Arena (17,102); Seattle, WA
*Non-conference game. ^{#}Rankings from AP Poll. (#) Tournament seedings in parentheses. W=West region. All times are in Mountain Time.

== Rankings ==
Ranking movements Legend: ██ Increase in ranking ██ Decrease in ranking — = Not ranked RV = Received votes
	Week																				
Poll	Pre	1	2	3	4	5	6	7	8	9	10	11	12	13	14	15	16	17	18	19	Final
AP	—	—	—	—	—	—	—	—	—	—	—	—	—	—	—	—	—	—	—	RV	RV
Coaches	—	—	—	—	—	—	—	—	—	—	—	—	—	—	—	—	—	—	—	RV	RV

== See also ==
- 2024–25 Colorado State Rams women's basketball team
