= Nique Clifford =

American basketball player (born 2002)

No. 18 – Oklahoma City Thunder
- Position: Shooting guard
- League: NBA

Personal information
- Born: February 9, 2002 (age 24) Colorado Springs, Colorado, U.S.
- Listed height: 6 ft 5 in (1.96 m)
- Listed weight: 210 lb (95 kg)

Career information
- High school: The Vanguard School (Colorado Springs, Colorado)
- College: Colorado (2020–2023); Colorado State (2023–2025)
- NBA draft: 2025: 1st round, 24th overall pick
- Drafted by: Oklahoma City Thunder
- Playing career: 2025–present

Career history
- 2025–2026: Sacramento Kings
- 2025: →Stockton Kings
- 2026–present: Oklahoma City Thunder

Career highlights
- First-team All-Mountain West (2025); Third-team All-Mountain West (2024); Mountain West All-Defensive Team (2025); Mountain West tournament MVP (2025)
- Stats at NBA.com
- Stats at Basketball Reference

Dominique Akai Clifford (born February 9, 2002) is an American professional basketball player for the Oklahoma City Thunder of the National Basketball Association (NBA). He played college basketball for the Colorado State Rams as well as the Colorado Buffaloes.

== Early life and high school career ==
Clifford grew up in Colorado Springs, Colorado and attended The Vanguard School. He was named the Colorado Gatorade Player of the Year as a senior after averaging 26.3 points, 13.7 rebounds, 5.9 assists, 3.5 steals and 2.8 blocks per game. Clifford committed to playing college basketball for Colorado over offers from Stanford, Denver, Northern Colorado, Colorado State and Wyoming.

== College career ==
Clifford began his college career playing for the Colorado Buffaloes. He averaged 6.7 points and 4.6 rebounds during his sophomore season. As a junior, Clifford played in 35 games with 33 starts and averaged 5.9 points and 3.9 rebounds per game. After the season, Clifford entered the NCAA transfer portal.

Clifford transferred to Colorado State. He averaged 12.2 points, 7.6 rebounds, and three assists and was named third-team All-Mountain West Conference in his first season with the Rams. The Rams defeated Virginia 67-42 in the first four of the 2024 NCAA tournament before falling to Texas in the round of 64.

In his final year of eligibility, Clifford was named first-team and defensive team All-Mountain West. On March 7, 2025, Clifford scored a career-high 36 points in a 83–73 victory against the Boise State Broncos in his final regular season game. On March 15, 2025, Clifford was named the 2025 Mountain West Conference men's basketball tournament MVP after he led the Rams with 24 points against the Boise State Broncos in the championship game. After receiving an automatic bid the 2025 NCAA Tournament, Clifford led the Rams to an upset victory over fifth seed Memphis in the round of 64 before falling in the round of 32 to Maryland 71-72 on a buzzer-beating shot as time expired. Clifford set a Colorado State record for points in a season with 681.

== Professional career ==
Clifford was selected with the 24th pick in the 2025 NBA draft by the Sacramento Kings after the Kings acquired his draft rights in exchange for a protected 2027 first-round pick with the Oklahoma City Thunder. On July 3, 2025, the Kings announced that they had signed Clifford. On February 8, 2026, Clifford recorded a career-high 30 points during a 126–132 loss to the Cleveland Cavaliers.

On November 8, 2026, Clifford was traded to the Oklahoma City Thunder for two second-round picks.

== Career statistics ==
Legend
GP	Games played	GS	Games started	MPG	Minutes per game
FG%	Field goal percentage	3P%	3-point field goal percentage	FT%	Free throw percentage
RPG	Rebounds per game	APG	Assists per game	SPG	Steals per game
BPG	Blocks per game	PPG	Points per game	**Bold**	Career high

=== NBA ===
==== Regular season ====
Year	Team	GP	GS	MPG	FG%	3P%	FT%	RPG	APG	SPG	BPG	PPG
2025–26	Sacramento	**75**	**28**	**25.1**	**.418**	**.333**	**.722**	**3.8**	**2.4**	**.9**	**.3**	**8.6**
2026–27	Sacramento	8	0	6.3	.353	.125	–	.9	1.0	.3	.0	1.6
Career		83	28	23.3	.416	.326	.722	3.5	2.3	.8	.3	7.9

=== College ===
Year	Team	GP	GS	MPG	FG%	3P%	FT%	RPG	APG	SPG	BPG	PPG
2020–21	Colorado	14	0	4.0	.143	.333	.667	.3	.4	.4	.1	1.0
2021–22	Colorado	33	17	23.1	.453	**.400**	.667	4.6	1.3	.6	.7	6.7
2022–23	Colorado	35	33	21.8	.374	.288	.532	3.9	1.5	.7	.6	5.9
2023–24	Colorado State	**36**	**36**	30.3	**.522**	.376	.759	7.6	3.0	**1.4**	**.9**	12.2
2024–25	Colorado State	**36**	**36**	**35.4**	.496	.377	**.777**	**9.6**	**4.4**	1.2	.6	**18.9**
Career		154	122	25.6	.469	.364	.724	5.9	2.4	.9	.6	10.1
