= 2025 Mountain West Conference men's basketball tournament =

American college basketball competition

- Classification: Division I
- Season: 2024–25
- Teams: 11
- Site: Thomas & Mack Center; Paradise, Nevada
- Champions: Colorado State (2nd title)
- Winning coach: Niko Medved (1st title)
- MVP: Nique Clifford (Colorado State)
- Television: Mountain West Network, CBSSN, CBS/Paramount+

2024–25 Mountain West Conference men's basketball standings
	Conf.				Overall
Team	W		L	PCT	W		L	PCT
New Mexico	17	–	3	.850	27	–	8	.771
Colorado State †	16	–	4	.800	26	–	10	.722
Utah State	15	–	5	.750	26	–	8	.765
San Diego State	14	–	6	.700	21	–	10	.677
Boise State	14	–	6	.700	26	–	11	.703
UNLV	11	–	9	.550	18	–	15	.545
Nevada	8	–	12	.400	17	–	16	.515
San Jose State	7	–	13	.350	15	–	20	.429
Wyoming	5	–	15	.250	12	–	20	.375
Fresno State	2	–	18	.100	6	–	26	.188
Air Force	1	–	19	.050	4	–	28	.125
† 2025 Mountain West tournament winner

The 2025 Mountain West Conference men's basketball tournament was the postseason men's basketball tournament for the Mountain West Conference. It was held March 12–15, 2025, at the Thomas & Mack Center on the campus of University of Nevada, Las Vegas, in Paradise, Nevada. The tournament champion, Colorado State, received the conference's automatic bid to the NCAA tournament. Colorado State's Nique Clifford was named tournament MVP.

== Seeds ==
All 11 Mountain West schools will participate in the tournament. Teams are to be seeded by conference record with a tiebreaker system to seed teams with identical percentages. The top five teams will receive byes into the tournament quarterfinals. The remaining teams will play in the first round. Tie-breaking procedures remained unchanged since the 2020 tournament.

- Head-to-head record between the tied teams
- Record against the highest-seeded team not involved in the tie, going down through the seedings as necessary
- Higher NET

Seed	School	Conf	Tiebreaker(s)
1	New Mexico	17–3	
2	Colorado State	16–4	
3	Utah State	15–5	
4	San Diego State	14–6	2–0 vs. Boise State
5	Boise State	14–6	0–2 vs. San Diego State
6	UNLV	11–9	
7	Nevada	8–12	
8	San Jose State	7–13	
9	Wyoming	5–15	
10	Fresno State	2–18	
11	Air Force	1–19	

== Schedule ==
Game	Time	Matchup	Score	Television	Attendance
First round – Wednesday, March 12
1	11:00 am	No. 8 San Jose State vs. No. 9 Wyoming	66–61	Mountain West Network	
2	1:30 pm	No. 7 Nevada vs. No. 10 Fresno State	86–71	Mountain West Network	
3	4:00 pm	No. 6 UNLV vs. No. 11 Air Force	68–59	Mountain West Network	
Quarterfinals – Thursday, March 13
4	12:00 pm	No. 1 New Mexico vs. No. 8 San Jose State	63–52	CBSSN	
5	2:30 pm	No. 4 San Diego State vs. No. 5 Boise State	52–62	CBSSN	
6	6:00 pm	No. 2 Colorado State vs. No. 7 Nevada	67–59	CBSSN	
7	8:30 pm	No. 3 Utah State vs. No. 6 UNLV	70–58	CBSSN	
Semifinals – Friday, March 14
8	6:30 pm	No. 1 New Mexico vs. No. 5 Boise State	69–72	CBSSN	
9	9:00 pm	No. 2 Colorado State vs. No. 3 Utah State	83–72	CBSSN	
Championship – Saturday, March 15
10	3:00 pm	No. 5 Boise State vs. No. 2 Colorado State	56–69	CBS/Paramount+	4,675
Game times in PDT. Rankings denote tournament seeding.

== Bracket ==
First round Wednesday, March 12; Mountain West Network
8	San Jose State	66
9	Wyoming	61
7	Nevada	86
10	Fresno State	71
6	UNLV	68
11	Air Force	59

Quarterfinals; Thursday, March 13; CBSSN
1	New Mexico	63
8	San Jose State	52
4	San Diego State	52
5	Boise State	62
2	Colorado State	67
7	Nevada	59
3	Utah State	70
6	UNLV	58

Semifinals; Friday, March 14; CBSSN
1	New Mexico	69
5	Boise State	72
2	Colorado State	83
3	Utah State	72

Championship; Saturday, March 15; CBS/Paramount+
5	Boise State	56
2	Colorado State	69
