= 2024–25 San Diego State Aztecs men's basketball team =

American college basketball season

2024–25 San Diego State Aztecs men's basketball

NCAA tournament, First Four
- Conference: Mountain West Conference
- Record: 21–10 (14–6 MW)
- Head coach: Brian Dutcher (8th season)
- Assistant coaches: Dave Velasquez (12th season); JayDee Luster (4th season); Ryan Badrtalei (1st season)
- Offensive scheme: Wheel
- Base defense: Pack-Line
- Home arena: Viejas Arena (Capacity: 12,414)

2024–25 Mountain West Conference men's basketball standings
	Conf.				Overall
Team	W		L	PCT	W		L	PCT
New Mexico	17	–	3	.850	27	–	8	.771
Colorado State †	16	–	4	.800	26	–	10	.722
Utah State	15	–	5	.750	26	–	8	.765
San Diego State	14	–	6	.700	21	–	10	.677
Boise State	14	–	6	.700	26	–	11	.703
UNLV	11	–	9	.550	18	–	15	.545
Nevada	8	–	12	.400	17	–	16	.515
San Jose State	7	–	13	.350	15	–	20	.429
Wyoming	5	–	15	.250	12	–	20	.375
Fresno State	2	–	18	.100	6	–	26	.188
Air Force	1	–	19	.050	4	–	28	.125
† 2025 Mountain West tournament winner

The 2024–25 San Diego State Aztecs men's basketball team represented San Diego State University during the 2024–25 NCAA Division I men's basketball season. The Aztecs were led by eighth-year head coach Brian Dutcher and played their home games at Viejas Arena as members in the Mountain West Conference.

== Previous season ==
The Aztecs finished the 2023–24 season 26–11, 11–7 in Mountain West play to finish in fifth place. They defeated UNLV in the quarterfinals of the Mountain West tournament and Utah State in the semifinals before losing to New Mexico in the championship game. They received an at-large bid to the NCAA tournament as the No. 5 seed in the East region, the school's fourth straight trip to the tournament. They defeated UAB and Yale in the first and second rounds before losing in last year's national championship game rematch to UConn in the sweet sixteen.

== Offseason ==
=== Departures ===
Name	Number	Pos.	Height	Weight	Year	Hometown	Reason for departure
Cade Alger	2	F	6'9"	196	(redshirt) Senior	Ripon, CA	Graduate transferred
Micah Parrish	3	G/F	6'6"	193	Senior	Detroit, MI	Graduate transferred to Ohio State
Jay Pal	4	F	6'9"	185	GS Senior	Omaha, NE	Graduated
Lamont Butler	5	G	6'2"	207	Senior	Moreno Valley, CA	Graduate transferred to Kentucky
Darrion Trammell	12	G	5'10"	176	GS Senior	Marin City, CA	Graduated
Jaedon LeDee	13	F	6'9"	244	GS Senior	Houston, TX	Graduated/undrafted in 2024 NBA draft; signed with the Minnesota Timberwolves
Elijah Saunders	25	F	6'8"	229	Sophomore	Phoenix, AZ	Transferred to Virginia
Ryan Raad	42	G	6'4"	189	Freshman	Los Angeles, CA	Walk-on; not on team roster

=== Incoming transfers ===
Name	Number	Pos.	Height	Weight	Year	Hometown	Previous college
Nick Boyd	2	G	6'3"	175	(redshirt) Junior	Garnerville, NY	Florida Atlantic
Wayne McKinney III	3	G	6'0"	190	Senior	Coronado, CA	San Diego
Kimo Ferrari	23	G	6'0"	185	GS Senior	San Diego, CA	Brown
Jared Coleman-Jones	31	F	6'10"	240	Senior	Hiram, GA	Middle Tennessee

=== 2024 recruiting class ===
College recruiting information
Name	Hometown	School	Height	Weight	Commit date
Pharaoh Compton #26 PF	Las Vegas, NV	Arbor View High School	6 ft 8 in (2.03 m)	220 lb (100 kg)	Oct 15, 2023
Pharaoh Compton #26 PF	Recruit ratings: Rivals: 247Sports: ESPN: (82)				
Taj DeGourville #30 SF	Las Vegas, NV	Wasatch Academy	6 ft 3 in (1.91 m)	190 lb (86 kg)	Jun 4, 2023
Taj DeGourville #30 SF	Recruit ratings: Rivals: 247Sports: ESPN: (81)				
Thokbor David Majak; C	Glendale, AZ	Dream City Christian	7 ft 0 in (2.13 m)	195 lb (88 kg)	Oct 10, 2023
Thokbor David Majak; C	Recruit ratings: Rivals: 247Sports: ESPN: (NR)				
Overall recruit ranking:
Note: In many cases, Scout, Rivals, 247Sports, On3, and ESPN may conflict in their listings of height and weight.; In these cases, the average was taken. ESPN grades are on a 100-point scale.; Sources: "2024 San Diego St. Basketball Commitment List". Rivals.; "2024 San Diego St. Player Commits". ESPN.; "2024 Team Ranking". Rivals.

=== 2025 recruiting class ===
College recruiting information (2025)
Name	Hometown	School	Height	Weight	Commit date
Tae Simmons #36 PF	Northridge, CA	Heritage Christian School	6 ft 3 in (1.91 m)	190 lb (86 kg)	Jul 4, 2024
Tae Simmons #36 PF	Recruit ratings: Rivals: 247Sports: ESPN: (80)				
Overall recruit ranking:
Note: In many cases, Scout, Rivals, 247Sports, On3, and ESPN may conflict in their listings of height and weight.; In these cases, the average was taken. ESPN grades are on a 100-point scale.; Sources: "2025 San Diego St. Basketball Commitment List". Rivals.; "2025 San Diego St. Player Commits". ESPN.; "2025 Team Ranking". Rivals.

== Roster ==
2024–25 San Diego State Aztecs men's basketball team
Players
Coaches

Pos.	#	Name	Height	Weight	Year	Previous school	Hometown
F	0	Magoon Gwath	7 ft 0 in (2.13 m)	205 lb (93 kg)	RS Fr	Veritas Prep (CA)	Euless, Texas
G	2	Nick Boyd	6 ft 3 in (1.91 m)	175 lb (79 kg)	RS Jr	Don Bosco Prep; Florida Atlantic	Garnerville, New York
G	3	Wayne McKinney III	6 ft 0 in (1.83 m)	198 lb (90 kg)	Sr	Coronado; San Diego	Coronado, California
G	4	Desai Lopez (W)	6 ft 3 in (1.91 m)	190 lb (86 kg)	Sr	Saint Francis; College of San Mateo	Fremont, California
F	5	Pharaoh Compton	6 ft 8 in (2.03 m)	245 lb (111 kg)	Fr	Arbor View	Chicago, Illinois
G	6	Ryan Schwarz (W)	5 ft 10 in (1.78 m)	178 lb (81 kg)	So	Miramonte	Orinda, California
G	8	Cam Lawin (W)	6 ft 3 in (1.91 m)	173 lb (78 kg)	RS So	Orr Academy	Chicago, Illinois
G	10	BJ Davis	6 ft 2 in (1.88 m)	175 lb (79 kg)	So	Modesto Christian School	Modesto, California
F	11	Demarshay Johnson Jr.	6 ft 10 in (2.08 m)	222 lb (101 kg)	RS Jr	Salesian College Prep	Richmond, California
G	14	Reese Dixon-Waters	6 ft 6 in (1.98 m)	207 lb (94 kg)	Sr	St. Bernard HS; USC	Long Beach, California
G	21	Miles Byrd	6 ft 7 in (2.01 m)	190 lb (86 kg)	RS So	Lincoln	Stockton, California
G	23	Kimo Ferrari	6 ft 0 in (1.83 m)	178 lb (81 kg)	GS	Francis Parker School; Brown	San Diego, California
G	24	Taj DeGourville	6 ft 5 in (1.96 m)	208 lb (94 kg)	Fr	Wasatch Academy	Las Vegas, Nevada
G	25	Raymar Gonzales (W)	6 ft 4 in (1.93 m)	170 lb (77 kg)	Fr	Eastlake	San Diego, California
F	31	Jared Coleman-Jones	6 ft 10 in (2.08 m)	235 lb (107 kg)	Sr	McEachern; Middle Tennessee	Jacksonville, FL
F	33	Thokbor Majak	7 ft 0 in (2.13 m)	208 lb (94 kg)	Fr	Dream City Christian	Bor, South Sudan
F	40	Miles Heide	6 ft 10 in (2.08 m)	233 lb (106 kg)	So	Mount Si	North Bend, Washington

Head coach

- Brian Dutcher (Minnesota)

Assistant coach(es)

- Dave Velasquez (San Diego State)
- JayDee Luster (Wyoming)
- Ryan Badrtalei (UCLA)

Legend

- (C) Team captain
- (S) Suspended
- (I) Ineligible
- (W) Walk-on
- Injured
- Current redshirt

Roster

== Schedule and results ==
Date time, TV	Rank^{#}	Opponent^{#}	Result	Record	High points	High rebounds	High assists	Site (attendance) city, state
Exhibition
October 30, 2024*; 7:00 p.m.		Cal State San Marcos	W 80–39		18 – Boyd	5 – Tied	3 – Tied	Viejas Arena (12,164); San Diego, CA
Regular season
November 6, 2024*; 7:00 p.m., YurView		UC San Diego	W 63−58	1−0	20 – Byrd	9 – Coleman-Jones	4 – Boyd	Viejas Arena (12,414); San Diego, CA
November 12, 2024*; 7:00 p.m., YurView		Occidental	W 100–49	2–0	16 – Tied	5 – Coleman-Jones	3 – Tied	Viejas Arena (12,366); San Diego, CA
November 18, 2024*; 7:00 p.m., CBSSN		No. 3 Gonzaga	L 67–80	2–1	23 – Boyd	9 – Boyd	3 – Tied	Viejas Arena (12,414); San Diego, CA
November 26, 2024*; 11:00 a.m., TBS		vs. No. 21 Creighton; Players Era Festival Power Tournament	W 71–53	3–1	18 – Davis	9 – Davis	5 – Boyd	MGM Grand Garden Arena; Paradise, NV
November 27, 2024*; 1:00 p.m., Max		vs. Oregon; Players Era Festival Power Tournament	L 68–78	3–2	18 – Davis	6 – Coleman-Jones	4 – DeGourville	MGM Grand Garden Arena; Paradise, NV
November 30, 2024*; 4:00 p.m., TNT/Max		vs. No. 6 Houston; Players Era Festival 3rd Place Game	W 73–70 ^{OT}	4–2	18 – Byrd	7 – Boyd	6 – Boyd	MGM Grand Garden Arena; Paradise, NV
December 4, 2024; 7:30 p.m., FS1	No. 24	at Fresno State	W 84–62	5–2 (1–0)	25 – Gwath	10 – Tied	4 – Boyd	Save Mart Center (5,610); Fresno, CA
December 7, 2024*; 7:00 p.m., YurView	No. 24	San Diego; City Championship	W 74–57	6–2	17 – Boyd	6 – Coleman-Jones	6 – Boyd	Viejas Arena (12,414); San Diego, CA
December 11, 2024*; 7:00 p.m., YurView	No. 23	California Baptist	W 81–75	7–2	19 – Byrd	5 – Heide	8 – Boyd	Viejas Arena (12,414); San Diego, CA
December 21, 2024*; 7:30 p.m., ACCN	No. 23	vs. California; San Jose Tip-Off	W 71–50	8–2	17 – Boyd	10 – Gwath	3 – Byrd	SAP Center; San Jose, CA
December 28, 2024; 3:00 p.m., FOX	No. 20	Utah State	L 66–67	8–3 (1–1)	14 – Tied	7 – Gwath	4 – Davis	Viejas Arena (12,414); San Diego, CA
January 4, 2025; 1:00 p.m., CBS		at Boise State	W 76–68	9–3 (2–1)	22 – Byrd	6 – DeGourville	5 – Boyd	ExtraMile Arena (12,058); Boise, ID
January 8, 2025; 7:30 p.m., FS1		Air Force	W 67–38	10–3 (3–1)	16 – Boyd	14 – Coleman-Jones	3 – DeGourville	Viejas Arena (12,414); San Diego, CA
January 11, 2025; 10:00 a.m., CBS		at New Mexico	L 48–62	10–4 (3–2)	14 – Byrd	4 – Tied	5 – Boyd	The Pit (15,428); Albuquerque, NM
January 14, 2025; 8:00 p.m., CBSSN		Colorado State	W 75–60	11–4 (4–2)	25 – Byrd	7 – Gwath	4 – DeGourville	Viejas Arena (12,414); San Diego, CA
January 18, 2025; 5:00 p.m., CBSSN		UNLV; Rivalry	L 68–76	11–5 (4–3)	21 – Byrd	7 – Tied	4 – Coleman-Jones	Viejas Arena (12,414); San Diego, CA
January 22, 2025; 7:00 p.m., CBSSN		at Air Force	W 77–76 ^{OT}	12–5 (5–3)	18 – McKinney III	7 – Tied	3 – Tied	Clune Arena (1,434); Colorado Springs, CO
January 25, 2025; 7:00 p.m., CBSSN		at Nevada	W 69–50	13–5 (6–3)	15 – Gwath	13 – Gwath	9 – Byrd	Lawlor Events Center (9,058); Reno, NV
January 28, 2025; 8:00 p.m., FS1		San Jose State	W 71–68	14–5 (7–3)	24 – Gwath	9 – Boyd	5 – Boyd	Viejas Arena (12,414); San Diego, CA
February 1, 2025; 5:00 p.m., CBSSN		Wyoming	W 63–61	15–5 (8–3)	14 – Gwath	11 – Gwath	4 – Byrd	Viejas Arena (12,414); San Diego, CA
February 8, 2025; 7:00 p.m., CBSSN		at Colorado State	L 63–68	15–6 (8–4)	15 – Gwath	10 – Gwath	8 – Boyd	Moby Arena (8,083); Fort Collins, CO
February 11, 2025; 8:00 p.m., CBSSN		at San Jose State	W 69–66	16–6 (9–4)	17 – Boyd	8 – Coleman-Jones	4 – Boyd	Provident Credit Union Event Center (4,287); San Jose, CA
February 15, 2025; 7:00 p.m., CBSSN		Boise State	W 64–47	17–6 (10–4)	24 – Boyd	6 – Tied	3 – Coleman-Jones	Viejas Arena (12,414); San Diego, CA
February 18, 2025; 8:00 p.m., CBSSN		Fresno State	W 83–60	18–6 (11–4)	19 – Boyd	6 – Tied	7 – Boyd	Viejas Arena (12,414); San Diego, CA
February 22, 2025; 5:00 p.m., CBSSN		at Utah State	L 71–79	18–7 (11–5)	15 – Boyd	5 – Tied	6 – Boyd	Smith Spectrum (10,270); Logan, UT
February 25, 2025; 8:00 p.m., FS1		New Mexico	W 73–65	19–7 (12–5)	17 – Boyd	9 – Byrd	6 – Boyd	Viejas Arena (12,414); San Diego, CA
March 1, 2025; 5:00 p.m., CBSSN		at Wyoming	W 72–69	20–7 (13–5)	18 – Tied	5 – Coleman-Jones	6 – Boyd	Arena-Auditorium (3,951); Laramie, WY
March 4, 2025; 8:00 p.m., CBSSN		at UNLV; Rivalry	L 67–74	20–8 (13–6)	19 – Boyd	10 – Byrd	6 – Byrd	Thomas & Mack Center (5,393); Paradise, NV
March 8, 2025; 7:30 p.m., FS1		Nevada	W 80–61	21–8 (14–6)	18 – Boyd	6 – Tied	5 – Byrd	Viejas Arena; San Diego, CA
Mountain West tournament
March 13, 2025; 2:30 p.m., CBSSN	(4)	vs. (5) Boise State; Quarterfinals	L 52–62	21–9	20 – Boyd	9 – Coleman-Jones	3 – Tied	Thomas & Mack Center; Paradise, NV
NCAA Tournament
March 19, 2025; 6:10 p.m., TruTV	(11 S)	vs. (11 S) North Carolina; First Four	L 68–95	21–10	12 – Tied	6 – Heide	3 – Davis	UD Arena (12,561); Dayton, OH
*Non-conference game. ^{#}Rankings from AP Poll. (#) Tournament seedings in parentheses. S=South. All times are in Pacific Time.

== Rankings ==
Ranking movements Legend: ██ Increase in ranking ██ Decrease in ranking — = Not ranked RV = Received votes
	Week																				
Poll	Pre	1	2	3	4	5	6	7	8	9	10	11	12	13	14	15	16	17	18	19	Final
AP	RV	—	—	—	24	23	23	20	RV	RV	RV	—	—	—	—	—	—	—	—	—	—
Coaches	RV	—	—	—	RV	24	23	20	RV	RV	RV	—	—	—	—	—	—	—	—	—	—
