= 2024–25 Utah State Aggies men's basketball team =

American college basketball season

2024–25 Utah State Aggies men's basketball

NIT Season Tip-Off champions

NCAA tournament, First Round
- Conference: Mountain West Conference
- Record: 26–8 (15–5 MW)
- Head coach: Jerrod Calhoun (1st season)
- Associate head coach: Eric Haut
- Assistant coaches: Mantoris Robinson; Eric Daniels; Ben Asher
- Home arena: Smith Spectrum

2024–25 Mountain West Conference men's basketball standings
	Conf.				Overall
Team	W		L	PCT	W		L	PCT
New Mexico	17	–	3	.850	27	–	8	.771
Colorado State †	16	–	4	.800	26	–	10	.722
Utah State	15	–	5	.750	26	–	8	.765
San Diego State	14	–	6	.700	21	–	10	.677
Boise State	14	–	6	.700	26	–	11	.703
UNLV	11	–	9	.550	18	–	15	.545
Nevada	8	–	12	.400	17	–	16	.515
San Jose State	7	–	13	.350	15	–	20	.429
Wyoming	5	–	15	.250	12	–	20	.375
Fresno State	2	–	18	.100	6	–	26	.188
Air Force	1	–	19	.050	4	–	28	.125
† 2025 Mountain West tournament winner

The 2024–25 Utah State Aggies men's basketball team represented Utah State University in the Mountain West Conference during the 2024–25 NCAA Division I men's basketball season. Led by first-year head coach Jerrod Calhoun, the Aggies played their home games on campus at the Smith Spectrum in Logan, Utah.

== Previous season ==
The Aggies finished the 2023–24 season 28–7, 14–4 in MWC play to win the regular season conference championship. They defeated Fresno State in the quarterfinals of the MWC tournament before losing to San Diego State. They received an at-large bid to the NCAA tournament as the No. 8 seed in the Midwest region. They defeated TCU in the first round before losing to No. 1-seeded Purdue.

On March 25, 2024, head coach Danny Sprinkle left the school to become the head coach at Washington.

== Offseason ==
=== Departures ===
Name	Number	Pos.	Height	Weight	Year	Hometown	Reason for departure
Landon Brenchley	0	G	6'4"	209	(redshirt) Sophomore	Providence, RI	Walk-on; transferred
Great Osobor	1	G/F	6'8"	250	Junior	Bradford, England	Transferred to Washington
Garrison Phelps	2	G	6'6"	192	Freshman	Phoenix, AZ	Transferred
Darius Brown II	10	G	6'2"	195	(redshirt) Senior	Pasadena, CA	Graduated
Dallin Grant	11	G/F	6'8"	218	Freshman	Cedar City, UT	Transferred to Utah Tech
Josh Uduje	14	G	6'5"	189	Junior	London, England	Transferred to San Jose State
Jackson Grant	21	F	6'10"	226	Junior	Olympia, WA	Transferred
Javon Jackson	22	G	6'3"	190	Sophomore	Houston, TX	Transferred to UIC
Max Agbonkpolo	23	G/F	6'9"	194	Senior	Laguna Niguel, CA	Graduate transferred to Montana State
Kalifa Sakho	34	F	6'11"	220	Junior	Rouen, France	Transferred to Sam Houston State
Nigel Burris	35	F	6'7"	224	Sophomore	San Francisco, CA	Transferred to Weber State

=== Incoming transfers ===
Name	Number	Pos.	Height	Weight	Year	Hometown	Previous college
Braden Housley	0	G	6'4"	180	(redshirt) Sophomore	Lehi, UT	Southern Utah
Pavle Stošić	1	F	6'9"	196	Sophomore	Niš, Serbia	Gonzaga
Tucker Bowman	3	G	5'9"	160	Sophomore	Centerton, AR	Central Arkansas
Dexter Akanno	7	G/F	6'5	210	GS Senior	Valencia, CA	Oregon State
Drake Allen	8	G	6'4"	190	GS Senior	Eagle Mountain, UT	Utah Valley
Deyton Albury	13	G	6'2"	190	Senior	Nassau, Bahamas	Queens (NC)
Aubin Gateretse	21	C	6'11"	210	Senior	Charleroi, Belgium	Stetson

=== Recruiting classes ===
==== 2024 recruiting class ====
College recruiting information
Name	Hometown	School	Height	Weight	Commit date
Isaac Davis #43 PF	Idaho Falls, ID	Hillcrest High School	6 ft 7 in (2.01 m)	220 lb (100 kg)	May 9, 2024
Isaac Davis #43 PF	Recruit ratings: Rivals: 247Sports: ESPN: (79)				
Jordy Barnes; PG	Holladay, UT	Olympus High School	6 ft 3 in (1.91 m)	N/A	Sep 25, 2023
Jordy Barnes; PG	Recruit ratings: Rivals: 247Sports: ESPN: (0)				
Overall recruit ranking: Scout: – Rivals: – 247Sports: #65
Note: In many cases, Scout, Rivals, 247Sports, On3, and ESPN may conflict in their listings of height and weight.; In these cases, the average was taken. ESPN grades are on a 100-point scale.; Sources: "2024 Team Ranking". Rivals.

== Roster ==
2024–25 Utah State Aggies men's basketball team
Players
Coaches

Pos.	#	Name	Height	Weight	Year	Previous school	Hometown
G	0	Braden Housley	6 ft 4 in (1.93 m)	180 lb (82 kg)	RS So	Skyridge HS; Southern Utah	Lehi, UT
F	1	Pavle Stošić	6 ft 9 in (2.06 m)	215 lb (98 kg)	So	CBP Huesca; Gonzaga	Niš, Serbia
G/F	2	Tucker Anderson	6 ft 9 in (2.06 m)	190 lb (86 kg)	So	Bentonville West HS; Central Arkansas	Benton, AR
G	3	Jaxon Smith (W)	6 ft 2 in (1.88 m)	188 lb (85 kg)	So	Woods Cross HS	Bountiful, UT
G	4	Ian Martinez	6 ft 3 in (1.91 m)	185 lb (84 kg)	GS	Junípero Serra Catholic HS; Maryland	Heredia, Costa Rica
G	5	Jordy Barnes	6 ft 3 in (1.91 m)	160 lb (73 kg)	Fr	Olympus HS	Holladay, UT
G	7	Dexter Akanno	6 ft 5 in (1.96 m)	210 lb (95 kg)	GS	Blair Academy; Oregon State	Valencia, CA
G	8	Drake Allen	6 ft 4 in (1.93 m)	190 lb (86 kg)	GS	Westlake HS; Utah Valley	Eagle Mountain, UT
G	12	Mason Falslev	6 ft 3 in (1.91 m)	203 lb (92 kg)	RS So	Sky View HS	Benson, UT
G	13	Deyton Albury	6 ft 2 in (1.88 m)	190 lb (86 kg)	Sr	Sunrise Christian Academy; Queens (NC)	Nassau, Bahamas
C	20	Isaac Johnson	7 ft 0 in (2.13 m)	227 lb (103 kg)	RS Jr	American Fork HS; Oregon	American Fork, UT
C	21	Aubin Gateretse	6 ft 11 in (2.11 m)	225 lb (102 kg)	Sr	Calusa Prep; Stetson	Charleroi, Belgium
F	22	Karson Templin	6 ft 8 in (2.03 m)	217 lb (98 kg)	So	Lovejoy HS	Fairview, TX
F	23	Isaac Davis	6 ft 8 in (2.03 m)	240 lb (109 kg)	Fr	Hillscrest HS	Idaho Falls, ID

Head coach

- Jerrod Calhoun (Cincinnati)

Assistant coach(es)

- Eric Haut (Kent State)
- Mantoris Robinson (Winthrop)
- Eric Daniels (Johnson & Wales)
- Ben Asher (West Virginia)

Legend

- (C) Team captain
- (S) Suspended
- (I) Ineligible
- (W) Walk-on
- Injured
- Current redshirt

Roster

== Schedule and results ==
Date time, TV	Rank^{#}	Opponent^{#}	Result	Record	High points	High rebounds	High assists	Site (attendance) city, state
Exhibition
October 18, 2024*; 7:00 p.m., MW Network		Weber State	W 85−66	–	17 – Martinez	7 – Johnson	6 – Allen	Smith Spectrum (4,157); Logan, UT
Regular season
November 6, 2024*; 7:00 p.m., MW Network		Alcorn State	W 101−46	1−0	24 – Gateretse	7 – Johnson	6 – Falslev	Smith Spectrum (8,131); Logan, UT
November 9, 2024*; 2:00 p.m., MW Network		Charlotte	W 103–74	2–0	23 – Martinez	9 – Gateretse	4 – Tied	Smith Spectrum (7,859); Logan, UT
November 13, 2024*; 7:00 p.m., KMYU		Westminster	W 117–53	3–0	24 – Martinez	7 – Gateretse	6 – Albury	Smith Spectrum (8,063); Logan, UT
November 18, 2024*; 7:00 p.m., KMYU		Montana	W 95–83	4–0	32 – Martinez	9 – Templin	4 – Allen	Smith Spectrum (8,054); Logan, UT
November 22, 2024*; 6:00 p.m., BTN		vs. Iowa; Hall of Fame Classic	W 77–69	5–0	25 – Falslev	12 – Falslev	6 – Martinez	T-Mobile Center; Kansas City, MO
November 28, 2024*; 3:30 p.m., ESPN2		vs. St. Bonaventure; NIT Season Tip-Off semifinals	W 72–67	6–0	15 – Falslev	12 – Falslev	6 – Allen	State Farm Field House; Bay Lake, FL
November 29, 2024*; 4:30 p.m., ESPN2		vs. North Texas; NIT Season Tip-Off championship game	W 61–57	7–0	28 – Falslev	11 – Akanno	2 – Tied	State Farm Field House (1,154); Bay Lake, FL
December 4, 2024; 7:00 p.m., MW Network		Wyoming	W 70–67	8–0 (1–0)	23 – Martinez	6 – Tied	5 – Allen	Smith Spectrum (8,420); Logan, UT
December 7, 2024*; 7:00 p.m., MW Network		Utah Tech	W 92–62	9–0	16 – Akanno	9 – Falslev	7 – Allen	Smith Spectrum (8,270); Logan, UT
December 14, 2024*; 2:00 p.m., MW Network		South Florida	W 88–67	10–0	27 – Falslev	9 – Falslev	9 – Falslev	Smith Spectrum (7,644); Logan, UT
December 17, 2024*; 7:00 p.m., MW Network		UC San Diego	L 73–75	10–1	18 – Templin	9 – Falslev	5 – Falslev	Smith Spectrum (7,354); Logan, UT
December 22, 2024*; 6:00 p.m., ESPN+		at Saint Mary's	W 75–68	11–1	18 – Falslev	7 – Akanno	5 – Martinez	University Credit Union Pavilion (3,500); Moraga, CA
December 28, 2024; 4:00 p.m., FOX		at No. 20 San Diego State	W 67–66	12–1 (2–0)	17 – Martinez	6 – Templin	7 – Barnes	Viejas Arena (12,414); San Diego, CA
December 31, 2024; 8:00 p.m., MW Network		at Nevada	W 69–64	13–1 (3–0)	17 – Martinez	6 – Falslev	5 – Falslev	Lawlor Events Center (7,528); Reno, NV
January 4, 2025; 7:00 p.m., KMYU		Fresno State	W 89–83	14–1 (4–0)	18 – Templin	10 – Templin	11 – Allen	Smith Spectrum (9,356); Logan, UT
January 7, 2025; 8:00 p.m., MW Network	No. 25	at San Jose State	W 85–78	15–1 (5–0)	17 – Falslev	7 – Tied	4 – Tied	Provident Credit Union Event Center (1,668); San Jose, CA
January 11, 2025; 7:00 p.m., CBSSN	No. 25	Boise State	W 81–79	16–1 (6–0)	18 – Martinez	5 – Falslev	4 – Tied	Smith Spectrum (10,270); Logan, UT
January 15, 2025; 9:00 p.m., CBSSN	No. 22	at UNLV	L 62–65	16–2 (6–1)	19 – Anderson	10 – Templin	4 – Tied	Thomas & Mack Center (4,659); Las Vegas, NV
January 22, 2025; 7:00 p.m., FS1		Nevada	W 90–69	17–2 (7–1)	23 – Martinez	6 – Foster	5 – Sanders	Smith Spectrum (9,797); Logan, UT
January 25, 2025; 2:00 p.m., MW Network		at Air Force	W 87–58	18–2 (8–1)	16 – Martinez	8 – Falslev	6 – Tied	Clune Arena (1,735); Colorado Springs, CO
January 29, 2025; 8:00 p.m., FS1		UNLV	W 76–71	19–2 (9–1)	16 – Albury	5 – Tied	3 – Barnes	Smith Spectrum (9,740); Logan, UT
February 1, 2025; 7:30 p.m., FS1		New Mexico	L 63–82	19–3 (9–2)	12 – Albury	7 – Falslev	4 – Tied	Smith Spectrum (10,270); Logan, UT
February 4, 2025; 6:30 p.m., MW Network		at Wyoming	W 71–67	20–3 (10–2)	19 – Martinez	7 – Falslev	3 – Falslev	Arena-Auditorium (3,550); Laramie, WY
February 7, 2025; 8:00 p.m., MW Network		at Fresno State	W 89–81	21–3 (11–2)	30 – Martinez	8 – Martinez	7 – Allen	Save Mart Center (4,801); Fresno, CA
February 11, 2025; 9:00 p.m., FS1		Colorado State	W 93–85	22–3 (12–2)	22 – Falslev	6 – Gateretse	6 – Allen	Smith Spectrum (9,130); Logan, UT
February 16, 2025; 2:00 p.m., CBSSN		at New Mexico	L 79–82	22–4 (12–3)	27 – Falslev	6 – Falslev	10 – Allen	The Pit (15,411); Albuquerque, NM
February 19, 2025; 7:00 p.m., KMYU		San Jose State	W 105–57	23–4 (13–3)	22 – Martinez	7 – Albury	8 – Falslev	Smith Spectrum (8,921); Logan, UT
February 22, 2025; 6:00 p.m., CBSSN		San Diego State	W 79–71	24–4 (14–3)	26 – Akanno	9 – Falslev	4 – Allen	Smith Spectrum (10,270); Logan, UT
February 26, 2025; 8:30 p.m., FS1		at Boise State	L 65–82	24–5 (14–4)	19 – Falslev	7 – Gateretse	3 – Tied	ExtraMile Arena (11,911); Boise, ID
March 1, 2025; 2:00 p.m., FS1		at Colorado State	L 66–93	24–6 (14–5)	17 – Martinez	5 – Falslev	2 – Tied	Moby Arena (7,155); Fort Collins, CO
March 8, 2025; 2:00 p.m., KMYU		Air Force	W 87–47	25–6 (15–5)	18 – Falsley	7 – Falsley	4 – Tied	Smith Spectrum (8,534); Logan, UT
Mountain West tournament
March 13, 2025; 9:30 p.m., CBSSN	(3)	vs. (6) UNLV; Quarterfinals	W 70–58	26–6	17 – Martinez	9 – Falslev	6 – Falslev	Thomas & Mack Center; Las Vegas, NV
March 14, 2025; 9:00 p.m., CBSSN	(3)	vs. (2) Colorado State; Semifinals	L 72–83	26–7	22 – Falslev	9 – Templin	4 – Martinez	Thomas & Mack Center; Las Vegas, NV
NCAA Tournament
March 20, 2025*; 7:25 p.m., TNT	(10 MW)	vs. (7 MW) UCLA; First Round	L 47–72	26–8	17 – Falslev	10 – Falslev	3 – Tied	Rupp Arena (16,258); Lexington, KY
*Non-conference game. ^{#}Rankings from AP Poll. (#) Tournament seedings in parentheses. MW=Midwest. All times are in Mountain.

== Rankings ==
Ranking movements Legend: ██ Increase in ranking ██ Decrease in ranking — = Not ranked RV = Received votes
	Week																				
Poll	Pre	1	2	3	4	5	6	7	8	9	10	11	12	13	14	15	16	17	18	19	Final
AP	—	—	RV	RV	RV	RV	RV	RV	RV	25	22	RV	RV	RV	RV	—	RV	—	—	—	—
Coaches	—	—	—	RV	RV	RV	RV	RV	RV	25	22	RV	RV	RV	RV	—	RV	—	—	—	—

== See also ==
- 2024–25 Utah State Aggies women's basketball team
