= 2023–24 Mountain West Conference men's basketball season =

- League: NCAA Division I
- Sport: Basketball
- Duration: November 6th 2023 - March 17th 2024
- Teams: 11
- TV partner(s): AltitudeTV, Altitude2, ATTSN CBSSN, CBS/Paramount+, Cowboy Sports Network, ESPN, ESPN2, ESPNU, ESPNews, ESPN+, ESPN3, Evoca, FloSports, FOX, Fox Sports 1, NBCSBA NSN, Stadium/MWN, Pac-12 Network, SECN, WCC Network, YouTube, YurView

Regular season
- Season champions: Utah State
- Season MVP: Great Osobor, Utah State

Mountain West tournament
- Champions: New Mexico
- Runners-up: San Diego State
- Tournament MVP: Jaelen House, New Mexico

Mountain West men's basketball seasons
- ← 2022–23 2024–25 →

2023–24 Mountain West Conference men's basketball standings
	Conf.				Overall
Team	W		L	PCT	W		L	PCT
No. 22 Utah State	14	–	4	.778	28	–	7	.800
Nevada	13	–	5	.722	26	–	8	.765
Boise State	13	–	5	.722	22	–	11	.667
UNLV	12	–	6	.667	21	–	13	.618
No. 17 San Diego State	11	–	7	.611	26	–	11	.703
New Mexico †	10	–	8	.556	26	–	10	.722
Colorado State	10	–	8	.556	25	–	11	.694
Wyoming	8	–	10	.444	15	–	17	.469
Fresno State	4	–	14	.222	12	–	21	.364
San Jose State	2	–	16	.111	9	–	23	.281
Air Force	2	–	16	.111	9	–	22	.290
† 2024 Mountain West tournament winner Rankings from AP Poll

The 2023–24 Mountain West Conference men's basketball season began with practices in October followed by the 2023–24 NCAA Division I men's basketball season which started on November 6, 2022. Conference play will begin in December 2023.

The Mountain West tournament will take place in March 2024 at the Thomas & Mack Center in Las Vegas, Nevada.

== Pre-season ==
=== Recruiting classes ===
Rankings
Team	ESPN	Rivals	On3 Recruits	247 Sports	Signees
Air Force	—	―	No. 127	―	―
Boise State	―	―	No. 105	No. 90	3
Colorado State	―	―	No. 146	No. 125	2
Fresno State	―	―	―	―	―
Nevada	―	―	No. 83	No. 56	3
New Mexico	―	―	No. 39	No. 41	2
San Diego State	―	―	No. 98	No. 83	3
San Jose State	―	―	No. 130	―	―
UNLV	―	―	No. 50	No. 68	4
Utah State	―	―	No. 132	No. 125	3
Wyoming	―	No. 58	No. 97	No. 125	4

=== Preseason watchlists ===
Below is a table of notable preseason watch lists.

Player	Wooden	Naismith	Cousy	West	Erving	Malone	Abdul-Jabbar	Olson
Isaiah Stevens	✓	✓	✓					

=== Preseason All-American teams ===
Player	The Athletic	Blue Ribbon Sports	CBS	College Hoops Today

=== Preseason polls ===
	247 Sports	AP	Blue Ribbon	CBS Sports	Coaches	ESPN	KenPom	Lindy's Sports	NCAA Sports	Sports Illustrated
Air Force	–	–	–	–	–	–	No. 157	–	–	–
Boise State	–	–	–	–	–	–	No. 63	–	–	–
Colorado State	–	–	–	–	–	–	No. 74	–	–	–
Fresno State	–	–	–	–	–	–	No. 100	–	–	–
Nevada	–	–	–	–	–	–	No. 67	–	–	–
New Mexico	–	–	–	–	–	–	No. 46	–	–	–
San Diego State	No. 20	No. 17	–	No. 13	No. 15	No. 18	No. 29	–	No. 15	No. 25
San Jose State	–	–	–	–	–	–	No. 171	–	–	–
UNLV	–	–	–	–	–	–	No. 77	–	–	–
Utah State	–	–	–	–	–	–	No. 239	–	–	–
Wyoming	–	–	–	–	–	–	No. 214	–	–	–

=== Mountain West Media days ===
The Mountain West will conduct its 2023 Mountain West media days on October 12, 2023.

The teams and representatives in respective order were as follows:

- Mountain West Commissioner – Craig Thompson
- Air Force – Joe Scott (HC)
- Boise State – Leon Rice (HC)
- Colorado State – Niko Medved (HC)
- Fresno State – Justin Hutson (HC)
- Nevada – Steve Alford (HC)
- New Mexico – Richard Pitino (HC)
- San Diego State – Brian Dutcher (HC)
- San Jose State – Tim Miles (HC)
- UNLV – Kevin Kruger (HC)
- Utah State – Danny Sprinkle (HC)
- Wyoming – Jeff Linder (HC)

Men's Basketball Preseason Poll
Place	Team	Points	First place votes
1.	San Diego State	333	125
2.	Boise State	299	4
3.	New Mexico	278	1
4.	Nevada	240	1
5.	Colorado State	218	--
6.	UNLV	199	--
7.	San Jose State	124	--
8.	Fresno State	115	--
9.	Utah State	105	--
10.	Wyoming	74	--
11.	Air Force	61	--

=== Mountain West Preseason All-Conference ===
First Team

Name	School	Pos.	Yr.	Ht.	Hometown (Last School)
Jaelen House	New Mexico	G	5th	6−0, 170	Phoenix, AZ (Arizona State)
Jamal Mashburn Jr.	New Mexico	G	Sr.	6−2, 195	Miami, FL (Brewster Academy)
Isaiah Stevens	Colorado State	G	5th	6−0, 185	Allen, TX (Allen HS)
Lamont Butler	San Diego State	G	Sr.	6−2, 205	Moreno Valley, CA (Riverside Poly High)
Tyson Degenhard	Boise State	F	Jr.	6−8, 235	Spokane, WA (Mt. Spokane HS)

2023 Mountain West Men's Basketball Individual Awards
Award	Recipient(s)
Player of the Year	Isaiah Stevens, Colorado State
Newcomer of the Year	Reese Waters, San Diego State
Freshman of the Year	Dedan Thomas, UNLV

=== Midseason watchlists ===
Below is a table of notable midseason watch lists.

Player	Wooden	Naismith	Robertson	Cousy	West	Erving	Malone	Abdul-Jabbar	Olson

=== Final watchlists ===
Below is a table of notable year end watch lists.

Wooden	Naismith	Robertson	Cousy	West	Erving	Malone	Abdul-Jabbar	Olson

== Regular season ==
The Schedule will be released in late October. All regular season conference games and conference tournament games would be broadcast nationally by ESPN Inc. family of networks including ABC, ESPN, ESPN2 and ESPNU, FOX, FS1, CBS Sports, AltitudeTV, AT&T Sports Network, Cowboy Sports Network, Evoca, FloSports, NBC Bay Area, Nevada Sports Network, Mountain West Network, Pac-12 Network, SEC Network, WCC Network, YouTube Live and YurView

=== Early season tournaments ===
Team	Tournament	Finish
Air Force	–	–
Boise State	ESPN Events Invitational	6th
Colorado State	Hall of Fame Classic	1st
Fresno State	Cancún Challenge	2nd
Nevada	Diamond Head Classic	1st
New Mexico	–	–
San Diego State	Continental Tire Main Event	1st
San Jose State	Paradise Jam	5th
UNLV	Sunshine Slam	4th
Utah State	Cayman Islands Classic	1st
Wyoming	Myrtle Beach Invitational	5th

=== Records against other conferences ===
Records against non-conference foes for the 2023–24 season. Records shown for regular season only.

Regular season

Power Conferences	Record
ACC	2–3
Big East	2–1
Big Ten	0–0
Big 12	1–5
Pac-12	6–1
SEC	0–0
Power Conferences Total	10–10
Other NCAA Division I Conferences	Record
American	3–0
America East	0–0
A-10	2–2
ASUN	1–0
Big Sky	5–7
Big South	0–0
Big West	13–2
CAA	4–1
C-USA	5–1
Horizon	1–0
Ivy League	0–0
MAAC	0–0
MAC	3–1
MEAC	2–0
MVC	0–2
NEC	1–0
OVC	1–0
Patriot League	0–0
SoCon	3–0
Southland	2–0
SWAC	1–1
The Summit	6–1
Sun Belt	1–1
WAC	5–3
WCC	18–6
Other Division I Total	77–28
Division II NAIA Total	16–0
NCAA Division I Total	104–38

Postseason

Power Conferences	Record
ACC	0–0
Big East	0–0
Big Ten	0–0
Big 12	0–0
Pac-12	0–0
SEC	0–0
Power Conferences Total	0–0
Other NCAA Division 1 Conferences	Record
American	0–0
America East	0–0
A-10	0–0
ASUN	0–0
Big Sky	0–0
Big South	0–0
Big West	0–0
CAA	0–0
C-USA	0–0
Horizon	0–0
Ivy League	0–0
MAAC	0–0
MAC	0–0
MEAC	0–0
MVC	0–0
NEC	0–0
OVC	0–0
Patriot League	0–0
SoCon	0–0
Southland	0–0
SWAC	0–0
The Summit	0–0
Sun Belt	0–0
WAC	0–0
WCC	0–0
Other Division I Total	0–0
NCAA Division I Total	0–0

=== Record against ranked non-conference opponents ===
This is a list of games against ranked opponents only (rankings from the AP Poll):

Date	Visitor	Home	Site	Significance	Score	Conference record
Nov. 9	New Mexico	No. 24 Saint Mary's	University Credit Union Pavilion ● Moraga, CA	−	58−72	0−1
Nov. 22	No. 22 James Madison	Fresno State†	Hard Rock Hotel Riviera Maya ● Cancun, Mexico	Cancun Challenge Championship	64−95	0−2
Nov. 23	No. 8 Creighton	Colorado State†	T-Mobile Center ● Kansas City, MO	Hall of Fame Classic	69−48	1−2
Nov. 26	Wyoming	No. 15 Texas	Moody Center ● Austin, TX	−	63−86	1−3
Dec. 1	No.19 BYU	Fresno State†	Delta Center ● Salt Lake City, UT	−	56−85	1−4
Dec. 13	No. 8 Creighton	UNLV†	Dollar Loan Center ● Henderson, NV	Jack Jones Classic	79−64	2−4
Dec. 26	San Diego State	No. 13 Gonzaga	McCarthey Athletic Center ● Spokane, WA	−	84−74	3−4
Dec. 30	Wyoming	No. 14 BYU	Marriott Center ● Prove, UT	−	68−94	3−5

Team rankings are reflective of AP poll when the game was played, not current or final ranking

† denotes neutral site game

=== Conference schedule ===
This table summarizes the head-to-head results between teams in conference play.

	Air Force	Boise State	Colorado State	Fresno State	Nevada	New Mexico	San Diego State	San Jose State	UNLV	Utah State	Wyoming
vs. Air Force	–	0–0	1–0	1–0	1–0	1–0	0–0	1–0	0–1	1–0	0–0
vs. Boise State	0–0	–	0–1	0–1	0–1	0–0	0–1	0–1	1–0	1–0	0–0
vs. Colorado State	0–1	1–0	–	0–0	1–0	0–1	0–0	0–0	0–1	1–0	1–0
vs. Fresno State	0–1	1–0	0–0	–	1–0	0–0	1–0	0–1	0–0	1–0	1–0
vs. Nevada	0–1	1–0	0–1	0–1	–	6–0	1–0	0–0	0–0	0–0	1–0
vs. New Mexico	0–1	0–0	1–0	0–0	0–4	–	0–1	0–1	1–0	0–1	0–1
vs. San Diego State	0–0	1–0	0–0	0–1	0–1	1–0	–	0–1	0–1	0–0	0–1
vs. San Jose State	0–1	1–0	0–0	1–0	0–0	1–0	1–0	–	1–0	0–0	1–0
vs. UNLV	1–0	0–1	1–0	0–0	0–0	0–1	1–0	0–1	–	1–0	0–0
vs. Utah State	0–1	0–1	0–1	0–1	0–0	1–0	0–0	0–0	0–1	–	0–1
vs. Wyoming	0–0	0–0	0–1	0–1	0–1	1–0	1–0	0–1	0–0	1–0	–
Total	1–6	5–2	3–4	2–5	3–4	6–2	5–2	1–6	3–4	6–1	4–3

=== Points scored ===
Team	For	Against	Difference
Air Force	1,239	1,226	13
Boise State	1,396	1,238	158
Colorado State	1,469	1,253	216
Fresno State	1,314	1,389	-75
Nevada	1,539	1,309	230
New Mexico	1,684	1,389	295
San Diego State	1,525	1,335	190
San Jose State	1,431	1,405	26
UNLV	1,361	1,281	80
Utah State	1,561	1,292	269
Wyoming	1,398	1,423	-25

Through January 24, 2024

=== Rankings ===
	Improvement in ranking
	Drop in ranking
RV	Received votes but were not ranked in Top 25
NV	No votes received

Team	Poll	Pre	Wk 2	Wk 3	Wk 4	Wk 5	Wk 6	Wk 7	Wk 8	Wk 9	Wk 10	Wk 11	Wk 12	Wk 13	Wk 14	Wk 15	Wk 16	Wk 17	Wk 18	Wk 19	Wk 20	Final
Air Force	AP	NV	NV	NV	NV	NV	NV	NV	NV	NV	NV	NV	NV	NV	NV	NV	NV	NV	NV	NV		
Air Force	C	NV	NV	NV	NV	NV	NV	NV	NV	NV	NV	NV	NV	NV	NV	NV	NV	NV	NV	NV	NV	
Boise State	AP	NV	NV	NV	NV	NV	NV	NV	NV	NV	NV	NV	NV	NV	RV	NV	NV	RV	RV	RV		
Boise State	C	RV	RV	NV	NV	NV	NV	NV	NV	NV	NV	NV	NV	NV	NV	RV	NV	RV	RV	RV	RV	
Colorado State	AP	NV	NV	RV	20	13	17	16	15	13	17	RV	24	RV	RV	RV	22	RV	RV	RV		
Colorado State	C	NV	NV	NV	21	12	18	17	14	14	18	RV	23	RV	RV	RV	25	24	NV	NV	NV	
Fresno State	AP	NV	NV	NV	NV	NV	NV	NV	NV	NV	NV	NV	NV	NV	NV	NV	NV	NV	NV	NV		
Fresno State	C	NV	NV	NV	NV	NV	NV	NV	NV	NV	NV	NV	NV	NV	NV	NV	NV	NV	NV	NV	NV	
Nevada	AP	NV	NV	RV	RV	RV	RV	RV	RV	RV	RV	RV	NV	NV	NV	RV	RV	RV	RV	23		
Nevada	C	NV	NV	RV	RV	RV	NV	NV	RV	RV	RV	RV	NV	NV	NV	NV	RV	RV	RV	RV	NV	
New Mexico	AP	RV	NV	NV	NV	NV	RV	RV	RV	RV	NV	RV	25	19	25	RV	RV	RV	RV	RV		
New Mexico	C	NV	NV	NV	NV	NV	RV	RV	RV	RV	RV	RV	25	20	20	25	RV	NV	NV	NV	NV	
San Diego State	AP	17	RV	RV	RV	25	RV	RV	RV	RV	19	RV	RV	RV	24	RV	19	20	21	RV		
San Diego State	C	15	RV	RV	RV	RV	RV	RV	RV	RV	19	24	RV	RV	RV	24	RV	19	19	19	RV	
San Jose State	AP	NV	NV	NV	NV	NV	NV	NV	NV	NV	NV	NV	NV	NV	NV	NV	NV	NV	NV	NV		
San Jose State	C	NV	NV	NV	NV	NV	NV	NV	NV	NV	NV	NV	NV	NV	NV	NV	NV	NV	NV	NV	NV	
UNLV	AP	NV	NV	NV	NV	NV	NV	NV	NV	NV	NV	NV	NV	NV	NV	NV	NV	NV	NV	NV		
UNLV	C	NV	NV	NV	NV	NV	NV	NV	NV	NV	NV	NV	NV	NV	NV	NV	NV	NV	NV	NV	NV	
Utah State	AP	NV	NV	NV	NV	NV	NV	NV	NV	NV	20	16	18	17	22	RV	RV	22	22	18		
Utah State	C	NV	NV	NV	NV	NV	NV	NV	NV	NV	23	17	20	17	17	21	RV	RV	23	22	18	
Wyoming	AP	NV	NV	NV	NV	NV	NV	NV	NV	NV	NV	NV	NV	NV	NV	NV	NV	NV	NV	NV		
Wyoming	C	NV	NV	NV	NV	NV	NV	NV	NV	NV	NV	NV	NV	NV	NV	NV	NV	NV	NV	NV	NV	

== Head coaches ==
=== Coaches ===
Note: Stats shown are before the beginning of the season. Mountain West records are from time at current school.

Team	Head coach	Previous job	Seasons at school	Record at school	Mountain West record	Mountain West titles	NCAA tournaments	NCAA Final Fours	NCAA Championships
Air Force	Joe Scott	Denver	8th	81–121 (.401)	33–78 (.297)	0	1	0	0
Boise State	Leon Rice	Gonzaga (assistant)	14th	268–155 (.634)	141–87 (.618)	2	4	0	0
Colorado State	Niko Medved	Drake	6th	91–64 (.587)	50–38 (.568)	0	1	0	0
Fresno State	Justin Hutson	San Diego State (assistant)	6th	80–73 (.523)	43–48 (.473)	0	0	0	0
Nevada	Steve Alford	UCLA	5th	70–51 (.579)	40–31 (.563)	0	1	0	0
New Mexico	Richard Pitino	Minnesota	3rd	34–31 (.523)	13–22 (.371)	0	0	0	0
San Diego State	Brian Dutcher	San Diego State (associate HC)	7th	147–46 (.762)	81–25 (.764)	3	4	1	0
San Jose State	Tim Miles	Nebraska	3rd	29–37 (.439)	11–25 (.306)	0	0	0	0
UNLV	Kevin Kruger	UNLV (assistant)	3rd	37–27 (.578)	17–19 (.472)	0	0	0	0
Utah State	Danny Sprinkle	Montana State	1st	0–0 (–)	0–0 (–)	0	0	0	0
Wyoming	Jeff Linder	Northern Colorado	4th	48–42 (.533)	24–28 (.462)	0	1	0	0

Notes:

- Mountain West records, conference titles, etc. are from time at current school and are through the end the 2022–23 season.
- NCAA tournament appearances are from time at current school only.
- NCAA Final Fours and Championship include time at other schools.

== Postseason ==
=== Mountain West tournament ===
The conference tournament will be played in March 13−16, 2024 at the Thomas & Mack Center in Las Vegas, NV. The top five teams will have a bye on the first day. Teams will be seeded by conference record, with ties broken by record between the tied teams followed by record against the regular-season champion, if necessary.

First round Wednesday, March 13; Mountain West Network
8	Wyoming	73
9	Fresno State	77
7	Colorado State	72
10	San Jose State	62
6	New Mexico	82
11	Air Force	56

Quarterfinals; Thursday, March 14; CBSSN
1	Utah State	87*
9	Fresno State	75
4	UNLV	71
5	San Diego State	74*
2	Nevada	78
7	Colorado State	85
3	Boise State	66
6	New Mexico	76

Semifinals; Friday, March 15; CBSSN
1	Utah State	70
5	San Diego State	86
7	Colorado State	61
6	New Mexico	74

Championship; Saturday, March 16; CBS/Paramount+
5	San Diego State	61
6	New Mexico	68

* denotes overtime period

=== NCAA tournament ===
Four teams were selected to participate:

Seed	Region	School	First Four	1st round	2nd round	Sweet 16	Elite Eight	Final Four	Championship
5	East	San Diego State	–	W vs. (12) UAB, 69–65	W vs. (13) Yale, 85–57	L vs. (1) UConn, 52–82	DNP		
10	West	Nevada	–	L vs. (7) Dayton, 60–63	DNP				
11	West	New Mexico	–	L vs. (6) Clemson, 56–77	DNP				
10	South	Boise State	L vs. (10) Colorado, 53–60	DNP					
8	Midwest	Utah State	–	W vs. (9) TCU, 88–72	L vs. (1) Purdue, 67–106	DNP			
10	Midwest	Colorado State	W vs. (10) Virginia, 67–42	L vs. (7) Texas, 44–56	DNP				
	Bids	W-L (%):	1–1 (.500)	2–3 (.400)	1–1 (.500)	0–1 (.000)	0–0 (–)	0–0 (–)	TOTAL: 4–6 (.400)

=== National Invitation Tournament ===
One team was selected to participate:

Seed	Bracket	School	First round	Second round	Quarterfinals	Semifinals	Finals
–	Seton Hall	UNLV	W vs. (2) Princeton, 77–84	W vs. Boston College, 79–70	vs. (1) Seton Hall	–	–
		W–L (%):	1–0 (1.000)	1–0 (1.000)	0–0 (–)	0–0 (–)	Total: 2–0 (1.000)

== Awards and honors ==
=== Players of the Week ===
Throughout the regular season, the Mountain West offices honored two players based on performance by naming them player of the week and freshman of the week.

Week	Player of the week	School	Freshman of the week	School
Nov 13	Kenan Blackshear	Nevada	Cam Manyawu	Wyoming
Nov 20	Jaedon LeDee	San Diego State	JT Toppin	New Mexico
Nov 27	Isaiah Stevens	Colorado State	JT Toppin (2)	New Mexico
Dec 4	Isaiah Stevens (2)	Colorado State	Tru Washington	New Mexico
Dec 11	Donovan Dent	New Mexico	JT Toppin (3)	New Mexico
Dec 18	Ian Martinez	Utah State	Dedan Thomas Jr.	UNLV
Dec 26	Jarod Lucas	Nevada	JT Toppin (4)	New Mexico
Jan 2	Reese Waters	San Diego State	No Selection	–
Jan 8	Great Osobor	Utah State	Mason Falslev	Utah State
Jan 15	Great Osobor (2)	Utah State	JT Toppin (5)	New Mexico
Jan 22	Sam Griffin	Wyoming	JT Toppin (6)	New Mexico
Jan 29	Jaelen House	New Mexico	JT Toppin (7)	New Mexico
Feb 5	Max Rice	Boise State	Dedan Thomas Jr. (2)	UNLV
Feb 12	Nick Davidson	Nevada	Dedan Thomas Jr. (3)	UNLV
Feb 19	Jaedon LeDee (2)	San Diego State	JT Toppin (8)	New Mexico
Feb 26	Darius Brown II	Utah State	Mason Falslev (2)	Utah State
Mar 4	Jarod Lucas (2)	Nevada	JT Toppin (9)	New Mexico

==== Totals per school ====
School	Total
New Mexico	13
Utah State	6
Nevada	4
San Diego State	3
UNLV	3
Colorado State	2
Wyoming	2
Air Force	0
Boise State	1
San Jose State	0
Fresno State	0

=== All-District ===
The United States Basketball Writers Association (USBWA) named the following from the Mountain West to their All-District Teams:

District VIII

All-District Team

District IX

Player of the Year

All-District Team

=== Mountain West season awards ===
The Mountain West presents two separate sets of major awards—one voted on by conference coaches and the other by media.

2024 Mountain West Men's Basketball Individual Awards
Award	Recipient(s)
Player of the Year	Great Osobor, Utah State
Coach of the Year	Danny Sprinkle, Utah State
Newcomer of the Year	Great Osobor, Utah State
Defensive Player of the Year	Lamont Butler, San Diego State
Sixth Man of the Year	Mustapha Amzil, New Mexico; Josh Uduje, Utah State
Freshman of the Year	JT Toppin, New Mexico; Dedan Thomas Jr., UNLV
Scholar-Athlete of the Year	

==== All-MWC ====
First Team

Name	School	Pos.	Yr.	Ht.	Hometown (Last School)
Tyson Degenhart ††	Boise State	F	Jr.		
Isaiah Stevens ††	Colorado State	G	Gr.		
Jaedon LeDee	San Diego State	F	Sr.		
Darius Brown II	Utah State	G	Gr.		
Great Osobor ‡	Utah State	W	Jr.		

- ‡ Mountain West Player of the Year
- ††† three-time All-Mountain West First Team honoree
- †† two-time All-Mountain West First Team honoree
- † two-time All-Mountain West honoree

Second Team

Name	School	Pos.	Yr.	Ht.	Hometown (Last School)
O'Mar Stanley	Boise State	F	Jr.		
Kenan Blackshear	Nevada	G	Gr.		
Jarod Lucas	Nevada	G	Gr.		
Donovan Dent	New Mexico	G	So.		
JT Toppin	New Mexico	F	Fr.		
Dedan Thomas Jr.	UNLV	G	Fr.		

Third Team

Name	School	Pos.	Yr.	Ht.	Hometown (Last School)
Nique Clifford	Colorado State	G	Sr.		
Nick Davidson	Nevada	F	So.		
Jaelen House	New Mexico	G	Gr.		
Keylan Boone	UNLV	F	Sr.		

Honorable Mention

Chibuzo Agbo, Sr., G, Boise State
Max Rice, Sr., G, Boise State
Lamont Butler, Sr., G San Diego State
MJ Amey, Jr., G, San José State
Kalib Boone, Sr., F, UNLV
Ian Martinez, Sr., G, Utah State
Sam Griffin, Sr., G, Wyoming

==== All-Freshman Team ====
Name	School	Pos.	Ht.

† Mountain West Player of the Year ‡ Mountain West Freshman of the Year

Honorable Mention

==== All-Defensive Team ====
Name	School	Pos.	Yr.	Ht.
Tré Coleman	Nevada	F	Sr.	
Jaelen House	New Mexico	G	Gr.	
Lamont Butler ‡	San Diego State	G	Sr.	
Luis Rodriguez	UNLV	G	Sr.	
Darius Brown II	Utah State	G	Gr.	

- † Mountain West Player of the Year
- ‡ Mountain West Defensive Player of the Year
- †† two-time Mountain West All-Defensive Team honoree

Honorable Mention

==== Scholar Athlete of the year ====
Name	School	Pos.	Ht., Wt.	GPA	Major

== 2023–24 Season statistic leaders ==
Scoring leaders
Rk	Player	PTS	PPG
1			
2			
3			
4			
5			

Rebound leaders
Rk	Player	REB	RPG
1			
2			
3			
4			
5			

Field goal leaders (avg 5 fga/gm)
Rk	Player	FG	FGA	PCT
1				
2				
3				
4				
5				

Assist leaders
Rk	Player	AST	APG
1			
2			
3			
4			
5			

Block leaders
Rk	Player	BLK	BPG
1			
2			
3			
4			
5			

Free throw leaders
Rk	Player	FT	FTA	PCT
1				
2				
3				
4				
5				

Steal leaders
Rk	Player	STL	SPG
1			
2			
3			
4			
5			

Three point leaders
Rk	Player	3P	3PA	%
1				
2				
3				
4				
5				

== 2024 NBA draft ==
Round	Pick	Player	Position	Nationality	Team	School/club team
−	−				−	

== Home game attendance ==
Team	Stadium	Capacity	Game 1	Game 2	Game 3	Game 4	Game 5	Game 6	Game 7	Game 8	Game 9	Game 10	Game 11	Game 12	Game 13	Game 14	Game 15	Game 16	Game 17	Game 18	Game 19	Total	Average	% of Capacity
Air Force	Clune Arena	6,002	1,417	1,209	1,411	1,466	1,048	2,377	1,827	945	**7,645**†	2,785										22,130	2,213	36.87%
Boise State	ExtraMile Arena	12,644	9,501	10,520	9,865	8,960	8,471	9,178	10,764	**12,058**†	9,863	11,705										100,885	10,089	79.79%
Colorado State	Moby Arena	8,745	4,331	4,802	3,830	8,083†	7,135	8,083†	5,739	6,852	5,165	6,345	8,083†									68,448	6,223	71.16%
Fresno State	Save Mart Center	15,596	4,419	2,796	2,638	1,109	3,166	3,003	5,083†	3,146	3,872											29,232	3,248	20.82%
Nevada	Lawlor Events Center	12,000	6,875	7,131	7,254	6,918	7,851	7,312	7,062	8,913	7,645	10,191†	9,029									86,181	7,835	65.29%
New Mexico	The Pit	15,411	11,106	10,484	10,216	**15,435**	10,311	11,536	11,962	12,611	**15,437**†	13,106										122,204	12,220	79.29%
San Diego State	Viejas Arena	12,414	**12,414**†	**12,414**†	12,240	**12,414**†	11,932	**12,414**†	**12,414**†	**12,414**†	**12,414**†	**12,414**†										123,484	12,348	99.46%
San Jose State	Event Center Arena	5,000	1,821	1,484	1,322	1,747	1,701	2,135	2,287	4,299†	3,118											19,914	2,213	44.26%
UNLV	Thomas & Mack Center	17,923	5,573	5,003	4,702	5,065	4,374	5,760	5,992	6,392†												42,681	5,358	29.89%
Utah State	Smith Spectrum	10,270	**10,270**†	7,112	7,880	7,078	4,950	6,804	**10,270**†	8,214	8,851											71,429	7,937	77.28%
Wyoming	Arena-Auditorium	11,612	3,362	3,826	3,272	3,584	3,447	3,368	3,763	4,136†												28,758	3,595	30.95%
Total		11,602																				715,346	6,662	57.42%

Bold – At or exceed capacity
†Season high
