= 2023–24 San Diego State Aztecs men's basketball team =

American college basketball season

2023–24 San Diego State Aztecs men's basketball

Continental Tire Main Event champions

NCAA tournament, Sweet Sixteen
- Conference: Mountain West Conference

Ranking
- Coaches: No. 18
- AP: No. 17
- Record: 26–11 (11–7 MW)
- Head coach: Brian Dutcher (7th season)
- Assistant coaches: Dave Velasquez; Chris Acker; JayDee Luster
- Offensive scheme: Wheel
- Base defense: Pack-Line
- Home arena: Viejas Arena (Capacity: 12,414)

2023–24 Mountain West Conference men's basketball standings
	Conf.				Overall
Team	W		L	PCT	W		L	PCT
No. 22 Utah State	14	–	4	.778	28	–	7	.800
Nevada	13	–	5	.722	26	–	8	.765
Boise State	13	–	5	.722	22	–	11	.667
UNLV	12	–	6	.667	21	–	13	.618
No. 17 San Diego State	11	–	7	.611	26	–	11	.703
New Mexico †	10	–	8	.556	26	–	10	.722
Colorado State	10	–	8	.556	25	–	11	.694
Wyoming	8	–	10	.444	15	–	17	.469
Fresno State	4	–	14	.222	12	–	21	.364
San Jose State	2	–	16	.111	9	–	23	.281
Air Force	2	–	16	.111	9	–	22	.290
† 2024 Mountain West tournament winner Rankings from AP Poll

The 2023–24 San Diego State Aztecs men's basketball team represented San Diego State University during the 2023–24 NCAA Division I men's basketball season. The Aztecs were led by seventh-year head coach Brian Dutcher and played their home games at Viejas Arena as members in the Mountain West Conference. The San Diego State Aztecs men's basketball team drew an average home attendance of 12,370 in 15 games in 2023–24.

== Previous season ==
The Aztecs finished the 2022–23 season 32–7, 15–3 in Mountain West play to win the Mountain West regular season championship. They defeated Colorado State, San Jose State, and Utah State to win the Mountain West tournament championship. As a result, they received the conference's automatic bid to the NCAA tournament as the No. 5 seed in the South region, the school's third straight trip to the tournament. They defeated Charleston and Furman to advance to the Sweet Sixteen for the first time since 2014. They defeated overall No. 1 seed Alabama and Creighton to advance to the Final Four for the first time in school history. In the national semifinal, they defeated Florida Atlantic to advance to the national championship game where they lost to UConn 76–59.

== Offseason ==
=== Departures ===
Name	Number	Pos.	Height	Weight	Year	Hometown	Reason for departure
Keshad Johnson	0	F	6'7"	225	Senior	Oakland, CA	Graduate transferred to Arizona
Adam Seiko	2	G	6'3"	210	RS Senior	Boston, MA	Graduated
Jared Barnett	4	G	6'1"	155	Senior	Los Angeles, CA	Walk-on; graduate transferred to Cal State Northridge
Matt Bradley	20	G	6'4"	220	GS Senior	San Bernardino, CA	Graduated/signed to play professionally in Germany with Rostock Seawolves
Tyler Broughton	24	G	6'4"	190	Junior	Ladera Ranch, CA	Walk-on; transferred
Nathan Mensah	31	F	6'10"	230	Senior	Accra, Ghana	Graduated/undrafted in 2023 NBA draft; signed with the Charlotte Hornets
Aguek Arop	33	F	6'7"	225	Senior	Omaha, NE	Graduated
Triston Broughton	42	G	6'4"	190	Junior	Ladera Ranch, CA	Walk-on; transferred

=== Incoming transfers ===
Name	Number	Pos.	Height	Weight	Year	Hometown	Previous college
Jay Pal	4	F	6'9"	190	GS Senior	Omaha, NE	Campbell
Reese Dixon-Waters	14	G	6'5"	210	Junior	Long Beach, CA	USC

=== 2023 recruiting class ===
College recruiting information
Name	Hometown	School	Height	Weight	Commit date
B.J. Davis #40 PG	Modesto, CA	Modesto Christian High School	6 ft 1 in (1.85 m)	170 lb (77 kg)	Sep 23, 2022
B.J. Davis #40 PG	Recruit ratings: Rivals: 247Sports: ESPN: (78)				
Miles Heide; PF	Snoqualmie, WA	Mount Si High School	6 ft 1 in (1.85 m)	170 lb (77 kg)	Oct 1, 2022
Miles Heide; PF	Recruit ratings: Rivals: 247Sports: ESPN: (NR)				
Magoon Gwath; C	Garden Grove, CA	Veritas Prep	6 ft 11 in (2.11 m)	210 lb (95 kg)	Jun 26, 2023
Magoon Gwath; C	Recruit ratings: Rivals: 247Sports: ESPN: (NR)				
Overall recruit ranking:
Note: In many cases, Scout, Rivals, 247Sports, On3, and ESPN may conflict in their listings of height and weight.; In these cases, the average was taken. ESPN grades are on a 100-point scale.; Sources: "2023 San Diego St. Basketball Commitment List". Rivals.; "2023 San Diego St. Player Commits". ESPN.; "2023 Team Ranking". Rivals.

=== 2024 recruiting class ===
College recruiting information (2024)
Name	Hometown	School	Height	Weight	Commit date
Taj DeGourville #27 SF	Las Vegas, NV	Wasatch Academy	6 ft 3 in (1.91 m)	190 lb (86 kg)	Jun 4, 2023
Taj DeGourville #27 SF	Recruit ratings: Rivals: 247Sports: ESPN: (81)				
Overall recruit ranking:
Note: In many cases, Scout, Rivals, 247Sports, On3, and ESPN may conflict in their listings of height and weight.; In these cases, the average was taken. ESPN grades are on a 100-point scale.; Sources: "2024 San Diego St. Basketball Commitment List". Rivals.; "2024 San Diego St. Player Commits". ESPN.; "2024 Team Ranking". Rivals.

== Roster ==
2023–24 San Diego State Aztecs men's basketball team
Players
Coaches

Pos.	#	Name	Height	Weight	Year	Previous school	Hometown
F	0	Magoon Gwath	7 ft 0 in (2.13 m)	189 lb (86 kg)	Fr	Veritas Prep (CA)	Euless, Texas
F	2	Cade Alger	6 ft 9 in (2.06 m)	196 lb (89 kg)	RS Sr	Ripon Christian HS; Seattle	Ripon, California
G/F	3	Micah Parrish	6 ft 6 in (1.98 m)	193 lb (88 kg)	Sr	River Rouge HS; Oakland	Detroit, Michigan
F	4	Jay Pal	6 ft 9 in (2.06 m)	185 lb (84 kg)	GS	Omaha Central HS; Campbell	Omaha, Nebraska
G	5	Lamont Butler	6 ft 2 in (1.88 m)	207 lb (94 kg)	Sr	Riverside Poly HS	Moreno Valley, California
G	8	Cam Lawin (W)	6 ft 3 in (1.91 m)	180 lb (82 kg)	RS Fr	Orr Academy	Chicago, Illinois
G	10	BJ Davis	6 ft 1 in (1.85 m)	161 lb (73 kg)	Fr	Modesto Christian School	Modesto, California
F	11	Demarshay Johnson Jr.	6 ft 10 in (2.08 m)	205 lb (93 kg)	RS So	Salesian College Prep	Richmond, California
G	12	Darrion Trammell	5 ft 10 in (1.78 m)	176 lb (80 kg)	GS	St. Ignatius College Prep; Seattle	Marin City, California
F	13	Jaedon LeDee	6 ft 9 in (2.06 m)	244 lb (111 kg)	GS	The Kinkaid School; TCU	Houston, Texas
G	14	Reese Dixon-Waters	6 ft 5 in (1.96 m)	215 lb (98 kg)	Jr	St. Bernard HS; USC	Long Beach, California
G	21	Miles Byrd	6 ft 7 in (2.01 m)	184 lb (83 kg)	So	Lincoln	Stockton, California
G	24	Ryan Schwarz (W)	5 ft 10 in (1.78 m)	176 lb (80 kg)	Fr	Miramonte	Orinda, California
F	25	Elijah Saunders	6 ft 8 in (2.03 m)	229 lb (104 kg)	So	Sunnyslope	Phoenix, Arizona
F	40	Miles Heide	6 ft 9 in (2.06 m)	225 lb (102 kg)	Fr	Mount Si	North Bend, Washington
G	42	Ryan Raad (W)	6 ft 4 in (1.93 m)	189 lb (86 kg)	Fr	Crescenta Valley	Los Angeles, California

Head coach

- Brian Dutcher (Minnesota)

Assistant coach(es)

- Dave Velasquez (San Diego State)
- Chris Acker (Chaminade)
- JayDee Luster (Wyoming)

Legend

- (C) Team captain
- (S) Suspended
- (I) Ineligible
- (W) Walk-on
- Injured
- Current redshirt

Roster

== Schedule and results ==
Date time, TV	Rank^{#}	Opponent^{#}	Result	Record	High points	High rebounds	High assists	Site (attendance) city, state
Exhibition
October 30, 2023*; 7:00 p.m.	No. 17	Cal State San Marcos	W 81–50		20 – LeDee	8 – Tied	4 – Waters	Viejas Arena (12,216); San Diego, CA
Non-conference regular season
November 6, 2023*; 7:30 p.m., FS1	No. 17	Cal State Fullerton	W 83–57	1–0	27 – LeDee	10 – LeDee	7 – Butler	Viejas Arena (12,414); San Diego, CA
November 10, 2023*; 6:00 p.m., ESPN+	No. 17	at BYU; Rivalry	L 65–74	1–1	21 – LeDee	7 – LeDee	3 – Butler	Marriott Center (15,689); Provo, UT
November 14, 2023*; 7:00 p.m., YurView		Long Beach State	W 88–76	2–1	27 – LeDee	11 – LeDee	6 – Trammell	Viejas Arena (12,414); San Diego, CA
November 17, 2023*; 6:30 p.m., ESPN+		vs. Saint Mary's; Continental Tire Main Event semifinals	W 79–54	3–1	25 – LeDee	8 – LeDee	4 – Tied	T-Mobile Arena (N/A); Paradise, NV
November 19, 2023*; 7:00 p.m., ESPN2		vs. Washington; Continental Tire Main Event championship	W 100–97 ^{OT}	4–1	34 – LeDee	17 – LeDee	4 – Tied	T-Mobile Arena (2,064); Paradise, NV
November 25, 2023*; 4:00 p.m., MW Network		vs. California; SoCal Showdown	W 76–67 ^{OT}	5–1	24 – Waters	7 – Tied	2 – Tied	The Pavilion at JSerra (2,293); San Juan Capistrano, CA
November 27, 2023*; 7:00 p.m., YurView		Point Loma Nazarene	W 71–51	6–1	15 – LeDee	13 – LeDee	5 – Trammell	Viejas Arena (12,240); San Diego, CA
December 1, 2023*; 7:00 p.m., ESPN+		at UC San Diego	W 63–62	7–1	15 – Parrish	10 – Tied	5 – Tied	LionTree Arena (4,000); San Diego, CA
December 5, 2023*; 6:00 p.m., ESPNU	No. 25	at Grand Canyon	L 73–79	7–2	24 – LeDee	10 – LeDee	6 – Butler	GCU Arena (7,282); Phoenix, AZ
December 9, 2023*; 7:40 p.m., FS1	No. 25	UC Irvine	W 63–62	8–2	14 – Parrish	12 – Waters	3 – Parrish	Viejas Arena (12,414); San Diego, CA
December 19, 2023*; 7:00 p.m., YurView		Saint Katherine	W 91–57	9–2	17 – LeDee	9 – Heide	3 – Tied	Viejas Arena (11,932); San Diego, CA
December 21, 2023*; 6:00 p.m., CBSSN		Stanford	W 74–60	10–2	18 – Butler	7 – Heide	4 – Butler	Viejas Arena (12,414); San Diego, CA
December 29, 2023*; 6:00 p.m., ESPN2		at No. 13 Gonzaga	W 84–74	11–2	22 – Waters	7 – LeDee	3 – LeDee	McCarthey Athletic Center (6,000); Spokane, WA
Mountain West regular season
January 3, 2024; 7:30 p.m., FS1		Fresno State	W 74–47	12–2 (1–0)	21 – LeDee	7 – Parrish	4 – Butler	Viejas Arena (12,414); San Diego, CA
January 6, 2024; 1:00 p.m., CBS		UNLV; Rivalry	W 72–61	13–2 (2–0)	20 – LeDee	11 – LeDee	3 – Butler	Viejas Arena (12,414); San Diego, CA
January 9, 2024; 8:00 p.m., CBSSN	No. 19	at San José State	W 81–78	14–2 (3–0)	31 – LeDee	10 – LeDee	3 – Parrish	Provident Credit Union Event Center (4,299); San Jose, CA
January 13, 2024; 11:00 a.m., CBS	No. 19	at New Mexico	L 70–88	14–3 (3–1)	15 – LeDee	9 – Waters	5 – Butler	The Pit (15,437); Albuquerque, NM
January 17, 2024; 8:00 p.m., CBSSN		Nevada	W 71–59	15–3 (4–1)	22 – LeDee	12 – LeDee	3 – Butler	Viejas Arena (12,414); San Diego, CA
January 20, 2024; 10:00 a.m., CBS		at Boise State	L 66–67	15–4 (4–2)	13 – LeDee	8 – LeDee	2 – Tied	ExtraMile Arena (11,705); Boise, ID
January 23, 2024; 6:00 p.m., CBSSN		Wyoming	W 81–65	16–4 (5–2)	23 – Butler	7 – LeDee	4 – Butler	Viejas Arena (12,414); San Diego, CA
January 30, 2024; 6:00 p.m., CBSSN		at Colorado State	L 71–79	16–5 (5–3)	17 – Waters	7 – LeDee	4 – Tied	Moby Arena (8,093); Fort Collins, CO
February 3, 2024; 12:30 p.m., FOX		No. 17 Utah State	W 81–67	17–5 (6–3)	16 – Tied	9 – LeDee	4 – Butler	Viejas Arena (12,414); San Diego, CA
February 6, 2024; 7:30 p.m., FS1	No. 24	at Air Force	W 77–64	18–5 (7–3)	15 – Waters	9 – LeDee	4 – Trammell	Clune Arena (1,556); Colorado Springs, CO
February 9, 2024; 5:00 p.m., CBSSN	No. 24	at Nevada	L 66–70 ^{OT}	18–6 (7–4)	20 – LeDee	10 – Parrish	4 – Tied	Lawlor Events Center (11,394); Reno, NV
February 13, 2024; 6:00 p.m., CBSSN		Colorado State	W 71–55	19–6 (8–4)	27 – LeDee	10 – Butler	5 – Trammell	Viejas Arena (12,414); San Diego, CA
February 16, 2024; 7:00 p.m., FS1		New Mexico	W 81–70	20–6 (9–4)	23 – LeDee	7 – Pal	6 – Byrd	Viejas Arena (12,414); San Diego, CA
February 20, 2024; 6:00 p.m., CBSSN	No. 19	at Utah State	L 63–68	20–7 (9–5)	23 – LeDee	6 – Pal	3 – Trammell	Smith Spectrum (9,233); Logan, UT
February 24, 2024; 7:00 p.m., CBSSN	No. 19	at Fresno State	W 73–41	21–7 (10–5)	22 – LeDee	11 – LeDee	6 – Trammell	Save Mart Center (6,452); Fresno, CA
February 27, 2024; 8:00 p.m., CBSSN	No. 20	San José State	W 72–64	22–7 (11–5)	27 – LeDee	11 – LeDee	8 – Trammell	Viejas Arena (12,414); San Diego, CA
March 5, 2024; 8:00 p.m., CBSSN	No. 21	at UNLV; Rivalry	L 58–62	22–8 (11–6)	14 – Saunders	7 – Tied	7 – Trammell	Thomas & Mack Center (7,911); Paradise, NV
March 8, 2024; 7:00 p.m., FS1	No. 21	Boise State	L 77–79 ^{OT}	22–9 (11–7)	21 – LeDee	6 – Tied	5 – Trammell	Viejas Arena (12,414); San Diego, CA
Mountain West tournament
March 14, 2024; 2:30 p.m., CBSSN	(5)	vs. (4) UNLV; Quarterfinals	W 74–71 ^{OT}	23–9	34 – LeDee	16 – LeDee	5 – Trammell	Thomas & Mack Center (8,968); Paradise, NV
March 15, 2024; 6:30 p.m., CBSSN	(5)	vs. (1) No. 18 Utah State; Semifinals	W 86–70	24–9	22 – LeDee	8 – LeDee	5 – Trammell	Thomas & Mack Center (13,213); Paradise, NV
March 16, 2024; 3:00 p.m., CBS/Paramount+	(5)	vs. (6) New Mexico; Championship Game	L 61–68	24–10	25 – LeDee	7 – Trammell	4 – Trammell	Thomas & Mack Center (11,112); Paradise, NV
NCAA tournament
March 22, 2024; 10:45 a.m., TNT	(5 E) No. 24	vs. (12 E) UAB; First Round	W 69–65	25–10	32 – LeDee	8 – LeDee	4 – Butler	Spokane Veterans Memorial Arena; Spokane, WA
March 24, 2024; 6:40 p.m., TBS	(5 E) No. 24	vs. (13 E) Yale; Second Round	W 85–57	26–10	26 – LeDee	9 – Leader	4 – Tied	Spokane Veterans Memorial Arena (11,514); Spokane, WA
March 29, 2024; 4:39 p.m., TBS/TruTV	(5 E) No. 24	vs. (1 E) No. 1 UConn; Sweet Sixteen	L 52–82	26–11	18 – LeDee	8 – LeDee	6 – Butler	TD Garden (19,144); Boston, MA
*Non-conference game. ^{#}Rankings from AP Poll. (#) Tournament seedings in parentheses. All times are in Pacific Time.

== Rankings ==
Ranking movements Legend: ██ Increase in ranking ██ Decrease in ranking RV = Received votes
	Week																				
Poll	Pre	1	2	3	4	5	6	7	8	9	10	11	12	13	14	15	16	17	18	19	Final
AP	17	RV	RV	RV	25	RV	RV	RV	RV	19	RV	RV	RV	24	RV	19	20	21	RV	24	17
Coaches	15	RV	RV	RV	RV	RV	RV	RV	RV	19	24	RV	RV	24	RV	19	19	19	RV	25	18
