= Nick Boyd =

American basketball player (born 2001)

- Boyd with the Wisconsin Badgers in 2026

No. 19 – Santa Cruz Warriors
- Position: Point guard / shooting guard
- League: NBA G League

Personal information
- Born: April 23, 2001 (age 25) Garnerville, New York, U.S.
- Listed height: 6 ft 3 in (1.91 m)
- Listed weight: 177 lb (80 kg)

Career information
- High school: Don Bosco Prep (Ramsey, New Jersey); St. Mary (Rutherford, New Jersey)
- College: Florida Atlantic (2020–2024); San Diego State (2024–2025); Wisconsin (2025–2026)
- NBA draft: 2026: undrafted
- Playing career: 2026–present

Career history
- 2026–present: Santa Cruz Warriors

Career highlights
- Second-team All-Big Ten (2026); Second-team All-Mountain West (2025)
- Stats at NBA.com
- Stats at Basketball Reference

Nicholas Boyd (born April 23, 2001) is an American professional basketball player for the Santa Cruz Warriors of the NBA G League. He played college basketball for the Florida Atlantic Owls, San Diego State Aztecs, and Wisconsin Badgers.

== High school career ==
Raised in Garnerville, New York, Boyd played his first two years of high school basketball at Don Bosco Prep in Ramsey, New Jersey, but found limited playing time. He subsequently transferred to St. Mary in Rutherford, New Jersey, playing his final two seasons there. In his junior season, Boyd scored 336 points before missing the rest of the season with a knee injury. In his senior season, Boyd scored 747 points to set a single-season scoring record for the school and was ranked No. 2 in the state for scoring. This led to him being named the North Jersey Interscholastic Conference (NJIC) Player of the Year.

=== Recruiting ===
Following an underwhelming recruiting cycle stemming from his junior year injury, Boyd took a gap year at Bosco Institute in Crown Point, Indiana. Boyd proceeded to receive offers from Sacred Heart, Iona, Niagara and Fairfield among others, ultimately committing to play for Dusty May at Florida Atlantic.

== College career ==
=== Florida Atlantic ===
As a freshman in the COVID-ridden 2020–21 season, Boyd came off the bench, averaging 5.1 points and 2.0 rebounds in 14.6 minutes per game. Boyd opted to redshirt the following season before ascending to a starting role in the 2022–23 season. Boyd was named Conference USA Freshman of the Week on December 5, 2022 after recording his first career double-double in the Owls' 84–59 win against South Alabama and scoring 17 points while recording seven rebounds in a 101–74 win over Eastern Michigan. On March 17, 2023, Boyd hit the game winning shot over Memphis in the Owls' first game in the 2023 NCAA tournament. Boyd proceeded to start every game of the Owls' cinderella run to the Final Four, most notably being the defender on Lamont Butler when he hit the buzzer-beater that sealed the 72–71 win for San Diego State in the Final Four. Overall, Boyd started 37 of the Owls' 38 games, averaging 8.9 points and 4.3 rebounds in 23.6 minutes per game.

In his redshirt sophomore season, Boyd averaged 9.3 points and 2.7 rebounds in 23.9 minutes per game but was moved to the bench, starting only 14 of 27 games. Following the season, after May left to accept the job at Michigan, Boyd entered the transfer portal.

=== San Diego State ===
On April 30, 2024, Boyd committed to play for the San Diego State Aztecs. Boyd started in all 31 of the Aztecs' games, averaging 13.4 points and 3.9 rebounds in 29.9 minutes per game. At the conclusion of the regular season, Boyd was named All-Mountain West second team. Following the season, Boyd entered the transfer portal for a second time.

=== Wisconsin ===
On April 8, 2025, Boyd committed to play for the Wisconsin Badgers. On January 12, 2026, Boyd was named as Big Ten Conference Men's Basketball Player of the Week. This came after he put up 20 points, eight rebounds and five assists in the Badgers' 80–72 win over UCLA on January 6, 2026 and followed that with 22 points, six assists and five rebounds with no turnovers in the Badgers' upset 91–88 win over No. 2 Michigan on January 10, 2026. On February 16, 2025, Boyd was named the Men's Basketball Player of the Week for a second time after he put up 25 points, five rebounds with no turnovers in the Badgers' upset 92–90 overtime win over No. 8 Illinois on February 10, 2026, followed by a 29-point performance in a 92–71 win over No. 10 Michigan State on February 13, 2026. In the Big Ten Tournament, Boyd was named to the All-Tournament Team, following scoring a career-high 38 points in an upset 91–88 overtime win over Illinois. Following the season, Boyd was named to the All-Big Ten Second Team.

== Professional career ==
After going undrafted in the 2026 NBA draft, Boyd joined the Golden State Warriors for the 2026 NBA Summer League. On September 18, 2026, Boyd signed a contract with the Warriors for training camp, but was waived nine days later. On October 26, Boyd joined the Warriors' G League affiliate, the Santa Cruz Warriors, for training camp.

== Career statistics ==
Legend
GP	Games played	GS	Games started	MPG	Minutes per game
FG%	Field goal percentage	3P%	3-point field goal percentage	FT%	Free throw percentage
RPG	Rebounds per game	APG	Assists per game	SPG	Steals per game
BPG	Blocks per game	PPG	Points per game	**Bold**	Career high

=== College ===
Year	Team	GP	GS	MPG	FG%	3P%	FT%	RPG	APG	SPG	BPG	PPG
2020–21	Florida Atlantic	23	0	15.0	.423	**.400**	.769	2.0	1.8	0.4	**0.1**	5.1
2021–22	Florida Atlantic	Redshirt										
2022–23	Florida Atlantic	**38**	**37**	23.9	.449	**.400**	.622	**4.3**	2.4	0.8	0.0	8.9
2023–24	Florida Atlantic	27	14	23.9	.400	.341	**.842**	2.7	1.8	0.9	0.0	9.3
2024–25	San Diego State	31	31	29.8	.411	.351	.749	3.9	3.9	**1.0**	–	13.4
2025–26	Wisconsin	35	35	**31.9**	**.480**	.365	.830	3.8	**4.3**	**1.0**	0.0	**20.7**
Career		154	117	25.5	.443	.369	.783	3.5	2.9	0.8	0.0	12.0

== Personal life ==
Boyd is a Christian. He is the nephew of former Rutgers head coach, Fred Hill.
