= Darius Brown (basketball) =

American basketball player (born 1999)

No. 0 – Dolomiti Energia Trento
- Position: Point guard / shooting guard
- League: Lega Basket Serie A EuroCup

Personal information
- Born: July 28, 1999 (age 27) Pasadena, California, U.S.
- Listed height: 6 ft 2 in (1.88 m)
- Listed weight: 192 lb (87 kg)

Career information
- High school: Pasadena (Pasadena, California)
- College: Cal State Northridge (2018–2022); Montana State (2022–2023); Utah State (2023–2024)
- NBA draft: 2024: undrafted
- Playing career: 2024–present

Career history
- 2024–2026: Cleveland Charge
- 2026: Cleveland Cavaliers
- 2026–present: Dolomiti Energia Trento

Career highlights
- First-team All-Mountain West (2024); Mountain West All-Defensive team (2024); Big Sky Defensive Player of the Year (2023); Third-team All-Big Sky (2023); Second-team All-Big West (2021)
- Stats at NBA.com
- Stats at Basketball Reference

Darius Brown II (born July 28, 1999) is an American basketball player for Dolomiti Energia Trento of the Lega Basket Serie A and the EuroCup. He played college basketball for the Cal State Northridge Matadors, Montana State Bobcats and Utah State Aggies.

== College career ==
Brown began his college career at Cal State Northridge (CSUN) in 2018, where he played four seasons, though his senior season was limited to 8 games by injuries, and he ultimately was granted a medical redshirt season. He then entered the transfer portal after the season, landing at Montana State under head coach Danny Sprinkle, who had been impressed with Brown at CSUN. Brown thrived at Montana State, earning the starting point guard position and earning Big Sky Conference Defensive Player of the Year honors. At the close of the season, Sprinkle was hired as the head coach at Utah State and Brown decided to follow.

== Professional career ==
Undrafted out of college in 2024, Brown landed with the Cleveland Charge of the NBA G League, where he averaged 7.7 points and 5.1 assists in his first professional season. For the 2025–26 season, Brown returned to the Charge. On January 10, he broke the Charge franchise single-game assist record, recording 22 in a loss to the Texas Legends.

On February 20, 2026, Brown was signed to a two-way contract by the Cleveland Cavaliers. He made his NBA debut on February 25, recording one rebound in three minutes of action against the New York Knicks. That was the only NBA game Brown appeared in, before being waived on March 3.

On July 22, 2026, Brown signed a one-year contract with Dolomiti Energia Trento of the Italian Lega Basket Serie A and the EuroCup, marking his move to European basketball after finishing the G League season as the league's leading assist provider.

== Career statistics ==
Legend
GP	Games played	GS	Games started	MPG	Minutes per game
FG%	Field goal percentage	3P%	3-point field goal percentage	FT%	Free throw percentage
RPG	Rebounds per game	APG	Assists per game	SPG	Steals per game
BPG	Blocks per game	PPG	Points per game	**Bold**	Career high

=== NBA ===
Year	Team	GP	GS	MPG	FG%	3P%	FT%	RPG	APG	SPG	BPG	PPG
2025–26	Cleveland	1	0	3.0	.000	–	–	1.0	.0	.0	.0	.0
Career		1	0	3.0	.000	–	–	1.0	.0	.0	.0	.0

=== College ===
Year	Team	GP	GS	MPG	FG%	3P%	FT%	RPG	APG	SPG	BPG	PPG
2018–19	Cal State Northridge	34	32	31.2	.457	.307	.771	3.6	5.2	1.4	.1	8.3
2019–20	Cal State Northridge	32	32	32.3	**.472**	.384	.774	3.7	4.0	1.2	.0	10.0
2020–21	Cal State Northridge	22	22	34.5	**.472**	.368	.722	**4.8**	5.3	**2.0**	.1	10.5
2021–22	Cal State Northridge	8	7	22.6	.356	.333	.727	3.1	1.5	.9	.0	5.6
2022–23	Montana State	34	33	29.5	.465	.397	**.909**	4.4	4.9	1.8	.0	9.1
2023–24	Utah State	**35**	**35**	**36.1**	.446	**.398**	.865	4.3	**6.5**	1.5	**.2**	**12.3**
Career		165	161	32.1	.457	.373	.813	4.1	5.0	1.5	.1	9.8
