= Great Osobor =

Spanish basketball player (born 2002)

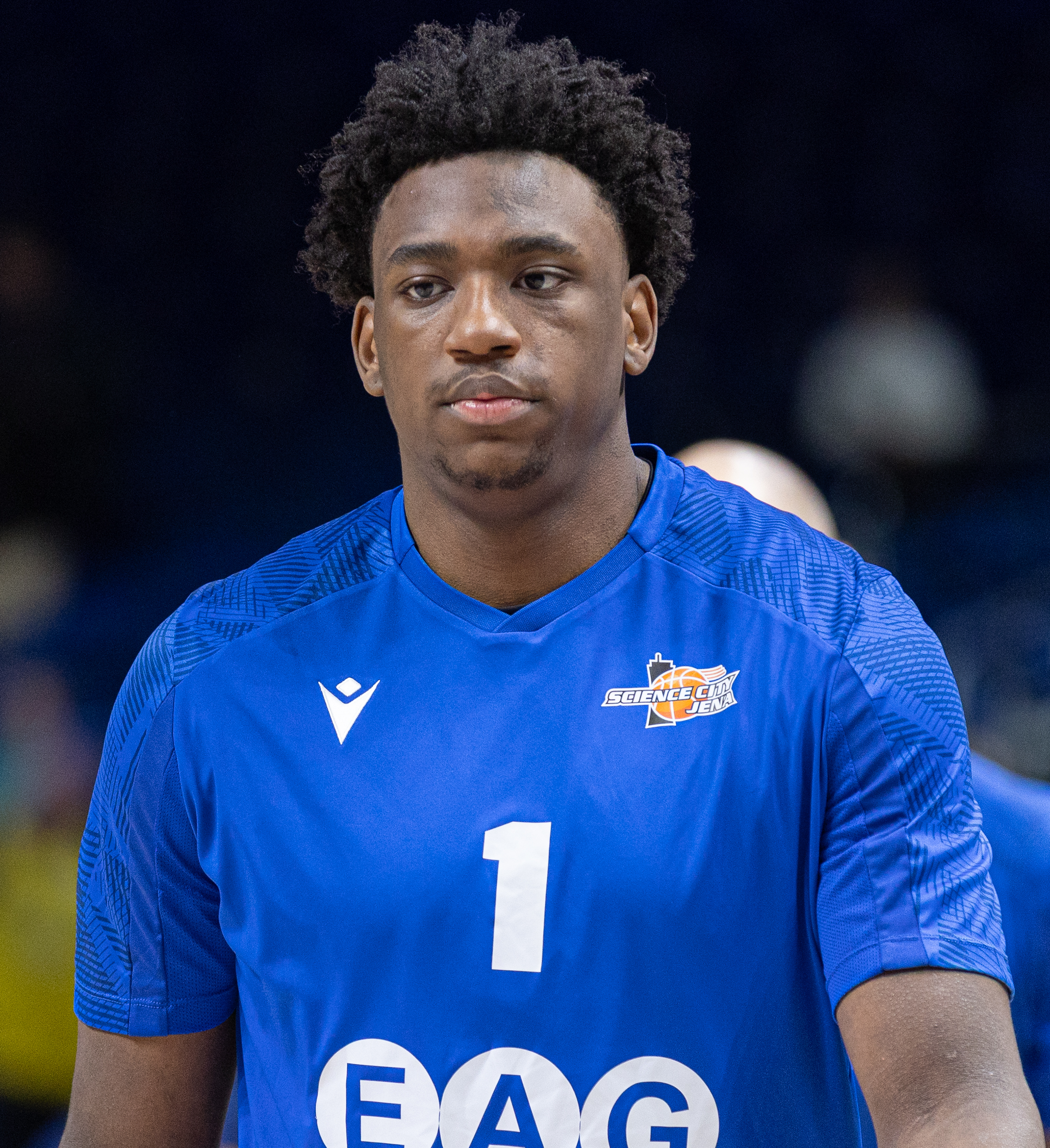
- Great Osobor, 2025

Free Agent
- Position: Power forward

Personal information
- Born: 13 December 2002 (age 23) Tudela, Navarre, Spain
- Listed height: 6 ft 8 in (2.03 m)
- Listed weight: 245 lb (111 kg)

Career information
- High school: Myerscough College (Bilsborrow, England)
- College: Montana State (2021–2023); Utah State (2023–2024); Washington (2024–2025)
- NBA draft: 2025: undrafted
- Playing career: 2020–present

Career history
- 2020–2021: Bradford Dragons
- 2025: Science City Jena

Career highlights
- Mountain West Player of the Year (2024); First-team All-Mountain West (2024); Mountain West Newcomer of the Year (2024)

Great Osobor (born 13 December 2002) is a Spanish professional basketball player who last played for Science City Jena of the German Basketball Bundesliga (BBL). He previously played for the Montana State Bobcats, Utah State Aggies, and Washington Huskies.

== Early life ==
Osobor attended Myerscough College in Bilsborrow, England. He averaged 18 points and 11 rebounds with Myerscough before averaging 16.8 points and 9.1 rebounds with the Bradford Dragons of the NBL Division 1. He committed to play college basketball at Montana State University over offers from UNC Greensboro, Princeton and UTSA.

== College career ==
Osobor made an immediate impact as a freshman at Montana State, averaging six points and four rebounds per game. The following season, he averaged ten points and five rebounds per game, being named the conference's top reserve. He entered the transfer portal following his sophomore season.

On May 2, 2023, Osobor announced that he would be transferring to Utah State University to play for the Aggies, following his coach Danny Sprinkle. He began his junior season by being named the MVP of the Cayman Islands Classic. During the season, Osobor emerged as the team's leading scorer. He set a new career high with 32 points in an 88–60 win over Air Force on January 2, 2024. Osobor was named the Mountain West Player of the Year and Newcomer of the Year, as well as being named first-team All-Mountain West. He finished the season averaging 17.7 points, 9.0 rebounds and 2.8 blocks per game, before entering the transfer portal for a second time. On May 13, 2024, he announced he would play his final season of college eligibility at Washington, again announcing his move after Sprinkle had taken over the head coaching position in Seattle. Osobor led the Huskies in the Huskies in scoring (14.8), rebounds (8.0) and assists per game (3.4), and was named All-Big Ten honorable mention.

== Professional career ==
On August 19, 2025, he signed with Science City Jena of Basketball Bundesliga (BBL). He averaged 16.1 points per game in the BBL before tearing an anterior cruciate ligament in his second game for the Spain men's national basketball team.

== Career statistics ==
Legend
GP	Games played	GS	Games started	MPG	Minutes per game
FG%	Field goal percentage	3P%	3-point field goal percentage	FT%	Free throw percentage
RPG	Rebounds per game	APG	Assists per game	SPG	Steals per game
BPG	Blocks per game	PPG	Points per game	**Bold**	Career high

=== College ===
Year	Team	GP	GS	MPG	FG%	3P%	FT%	RPG	APG	SPG	BPG	PPG
2021–22	Montana State	**35**	1	15.0	**.681**	.000	.663	4.2	.7	.5	.5	6.0
2022–23	Montana State	34	2	19.0	.624	**.500**	**.664**	4.6	1.0	.6	.9	10.1
2023–24	Utah State	**35**	**35**	**33.6**	.577	.214	.637	**9.0**	2.8	1.3	**1.4**	**17.7**
2024–25	Washington	31	31	31.2	.470	.245	.621	8.0	**3.4**	**1.9**	.5	14.8
Total		135	69	24.6	.562	.239	.641	6.4	1.9	1.1	.8	12.1
