= Jackson Grant =

American basketball player (born 2002)

Personal information
- Born: October 16, 2002 (age 24)
- Listed height: 6 ft 10 in (2.08 m)
- Listed weight: 226 lb (103 kg)

Career information
- High school: Olympia (Olympia, Washington)
- College: Washington (2021–2023); Utah State (2023–2024)
- Position: Power forward / center

Career highlights
- McDonald's All-American (2021); Nike Hoop Summit (2021)

Jackson Paul Grant (born October 16, 2002) is an American former basketball player. He played college basketball for the Washington Huskies and the Utah State Aggies.

== High school career ==
Grant played basketball for Olympia High School in Olympia, Washington. He stood 6 feet 9 inches (2.06 m) as a 16-year-old sophomore. In his junior season, he averaged 17 points and 11 rebounds per game, leading his team to fourth place at the Class 4A state tournament, and was named All-Area Player of the Year. As a senior, Grant averaged 22.9 points, 11.2 rebounds and three blocks per game, earning Washington Gatorade Player of the Year, McDonald's All-American, and Nike Hoop Summit accolades. He repeated as All-Area Player of the Year and left as Olympia's all-time leading scorer.

=== Recruiting ===
A consensus four-star recruit, Grant committed to playing college basketball for Washington over offers from California, Oklahoma, Stanford, and Wisconsin.

College recruiting
Name	Hometown	School	Height	Weight	Commit date
Jackson Grant; C	Olympia, WA	Olympia (WA)	6 ft 10 in (2.08 m)	205 lb (93 kg)	Nov 9, 2019
Jackson Grant; C	Recruit ratings: Rivals: 247Sports: On3: ESPN: (86)				
Overall recruit ranking: Rivals: 88 247Sports: 95 On3: 101 ESPN: 44
Note: In many cases, Scout, Rivals, 247Sports, On3, and ESPN may conflict in their listings of height and weight.; In these cases, the average was taken. ESPN grades are on a 100-point scale.; Sources: "Washington 2021 Basketball Commitments". Rivals.; "2021 Washington Huskies Recruiting Class". ESPN.; "2021 Team Ranking". Rivals.

== Career statistics ==
Legend
GP	Games played	GS	Games started	MPG	Minutes per game
FG%	Field goal percentage	3P%	3-point field goal percentage	FT%	Free throw percentage
RPG	Rebounds per game	APG	Assists per game	SPG	Steals per game
BPG	Blocks per game	PPG	Points per game	**Bold**	Career high

=== College ===
Year	Team	GP	GS	MPG	FG%	3P%	FT%	RPG	APG	SPG	BPG	PPG
2021–22	Washington	**25**	0	**6.5**	**.375**	.000	.563	**1.5**	.1	**.2**	**.3**	1.1
2022–23	Washington	14	0	6.0	.133	.000	.375	**1.5**	.1	.1	**.3**	.5
2023–24	Utah State	5	0	6.0	**.375**	—	**.833**	1.2	**.2**	.0	.0	**2.2**
Career		44	0	6.3	.298	.000	.567	1.5	.1	.1	.3	1.0
