= Miles Byrd =

American basketball player (born 2004)

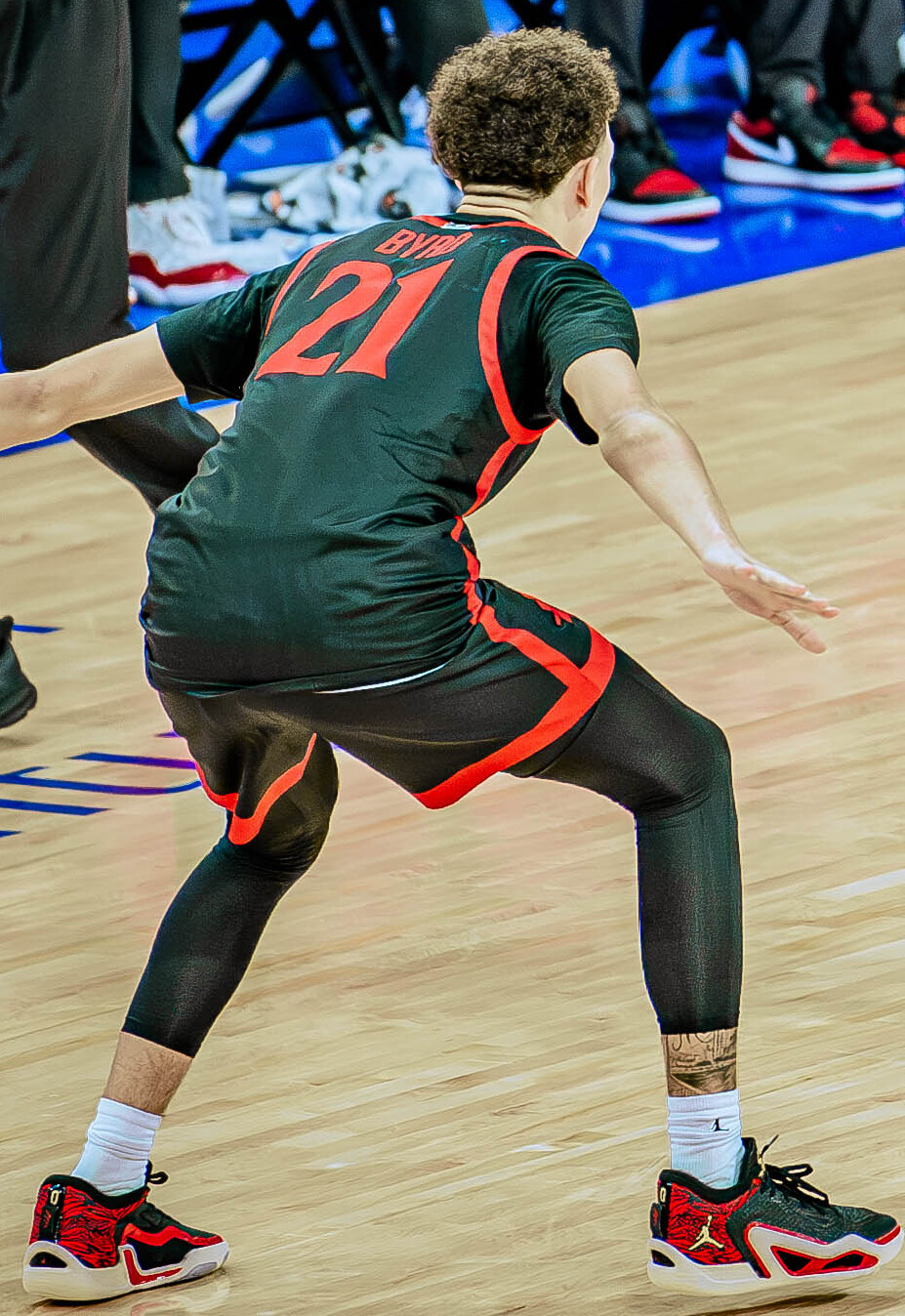
- Byrd in 2024

No. 21 – Providence Friars
- Position: Shooting guard
- Conference: Big East Conference

Personal information
- Born: September 8, 2004 (age 22)
- Listed height: 6 ft 7 in (2.01 m)
- Listed weight: 190 lb (86 kg)

Career information
- High school: Lincoln (Stockton, California)
- College: San Diego State (2022–2026); Providence (2026–present)

Career highlights
- Mountain West Defensive Player of the Year (2026); Second-team All-Mountain West (2025); Third-team All-Mountain West (2026); 2× Mountain West All-Defensive team (2025, 2026)

Miles Byrd (born September 8, 2004) is an American college basketball player for the Providence Friars of the Big East Conference. He previously played for the San Diego State Aztecs.

== Early life and high school ==
Byrd grew up in Stockton, California and attended Lincoln High School. He averaged 17.2 points, 5.2 rebounds, 3.3 assists, 2.8 steals, and 1.2 blocks per game as a senior. Byrd committed to play college basketball at San Diego State over offers from Villanova, Washington, Minnesota, Saint Mary’s, and Colorado State.

== College career ==
Byrd played in four games during his true freshman year at San Diego State while utilizing a redshirt. As a redshirt freshman he averaged 4.0 points and 2.5 rebounds in 34 games played. Byrd became a starter for the Aztecs entering his redshirt sophomore season.

On April 26, 2025, Byrd declared for the 2025 NBA Draft, while still maintaining his college eligibility for the next season if he chose to forego it. On May 28, 2025, Byrd decided to withdraw from the draft class and return to college.

== Personal life ==
Byrd's father, Calvin, played college basketball at Villanova and professionally in the Atlantic Basketball Association and in Switzerland before becoming a basketball coach.
