= Jaedon LeDee =

American basketball player (born 1999)

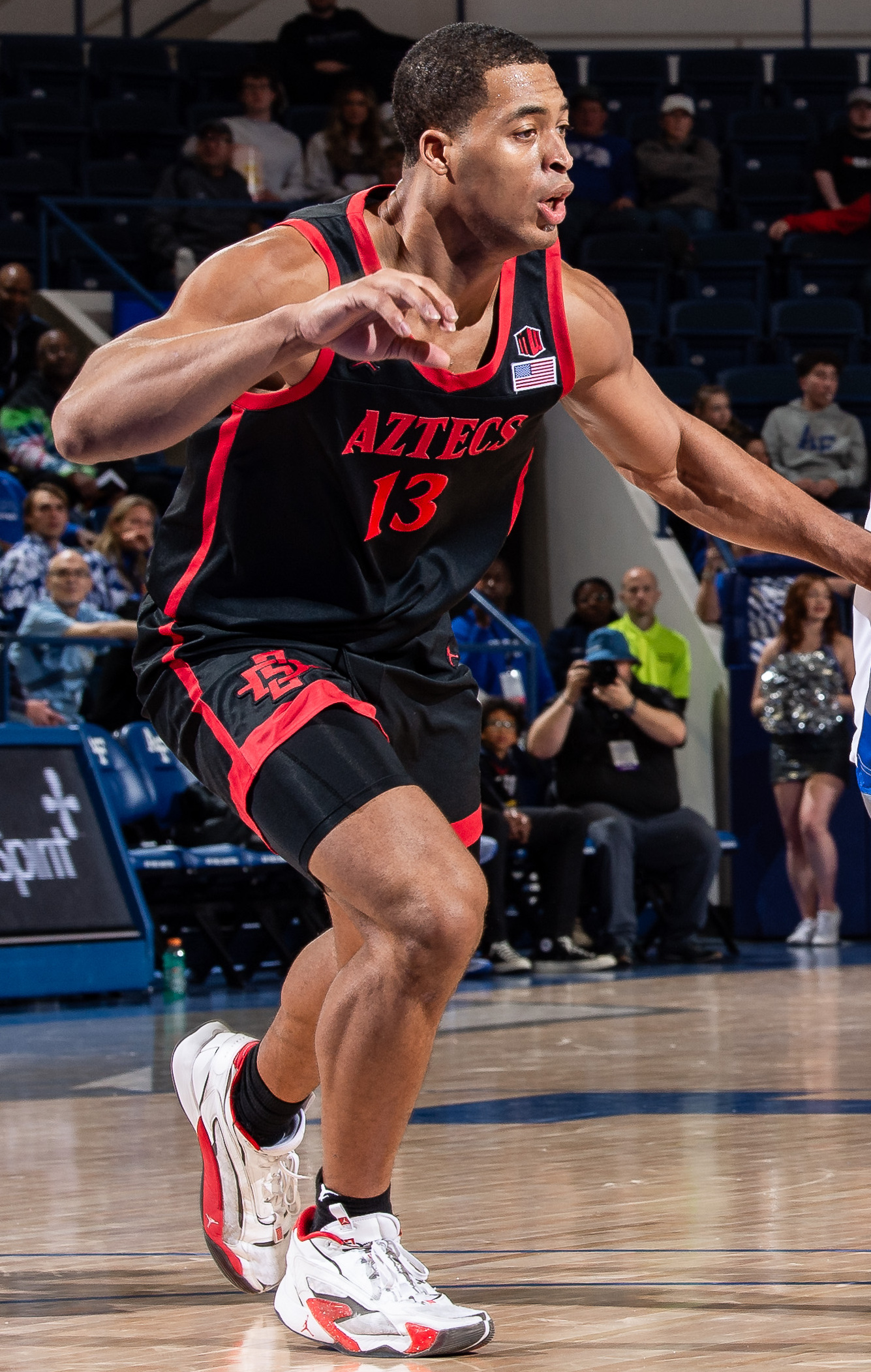
- LeDee with San Diego State in 2024

No. 4 – Kawasaki Brave Thunders
- Position: Power forward
- League: B.League

Personal information
- Born: July 25, 1999 (age 27) Houston, Texas, U.S.
- Listed height: 6 ft 7 in (2.01 m)
- Listed weight: 242 lb (110 kg)

Career information
- High school: The Kinkaid School (Piney Point Village, Texas)
- College: Ohio State (2018–2019); TCU (2019–2021); San Diego State (2022–2024)
- NBA draft: 2024: undrafted
- Playing career: 2024–present

Career history
- 2024–2025: Iowa Wolves
- 2025: Salt Lake City Stars
- 2025–2026: Skyliners Frankfurt
- 2026: Liaoning Flying Leopards
- 2026–present: Kawasaki Brave Thunders

Career highlights
- Second-team All-American – NABC, SN (2024); Third-team All-American – AP (2024); Karl Malone Award (2024); First-team All-Mountain West (2024)
- Stats at NBA.com
- Stats at Basketball Reference

Jaedon Herbert LeDee (born July 25, 1999) is an American professional basketball player for the Kawasaki Brave Thunders of the Japanese B.League. He played college basketball for the Ohio State Buckeyes, the TCU Horned Frogs, and the San Diego State Aztecs.

== High school career ==
LeDee comes from Houston and starred at The Kinkaid School, where he grew seven inches during his high school career, shifting from the point guard position to the frontcourt. He chose Ohio State over several other offers.

== College career ==
After his freshman season for the Buckeyes, LeDee transferred to Texas Christian University (TCU). He played two seasons at TCU, averaging 4.1 points and 3.3 rebounds per game, often playing out of position at center. Dissatisfied with his lack of playing time, he again transferred, this time to San Diego State.

After sitting out a season due to transfer requirements, LeDee became a key part of the rotation in his first season on the court for the Aztecs, averaging 7.9 points and 5.3 rebounds coming off the bench. LeDee helped propel the Aztecs to the Mountain West Conference (MWC) regular season and conference tournament titles, and in the NCAA Tournament, their first Final Four appearance and a national runner-up finish. Following the season, he declared for the 2023 NBA draft, but did not hire an agent and ultimately decided to return to San Diego State for his fifth and final year of eligibility.

In his final season on the Mesa, LeDee made significant strides as he became a starter and established himself early in the season as a force on the court. In November 2023, he led the Aztecs to victories over Saint Mary’s and Washington to win the Continental Tire Main Event tournament, and he was named Most Valuable Player for the event. Although the Aztecs finished fifth in the Mountain West Conference regular season, he averaged 21.4 points, 8.4 rebounds, and 1.3 assists per game on the season. With LeDee leading the way, the Aztecs once again made a run in the NCAA Tournament, but fell in the Sweet 16 to eventual champion UConn.

LeDee led the MWC in field goal attempts and field goals, free throw attempts and free throws, points, and points per game. He also broke several San Diego State single season records including for points, field goals, free throws, and combined points, rebounds, and assists. He was named to the All-Mountain West first team and was named Conference Player of the Year by the conference media.

Nationally, LeDee was named ESPN, Lute Olson, and NCAA March Madness Player of the Week (once each) and Oscar Robertson National Player of the Week twice. He was named a second-team All-American by The Sporting News, National Association of Basketball Coaches and a third-team All-American by the Associated Press. He was also named a John R. Wooden Award All-American.

On April 6, 2024, LeDee was named by the Naismith Memorial Basketball Hall of Fame as the winner of the 2024 Karl Malone Award, awarded to the best power forward in the nation. He is the first winner of the award in SDSU history.

== Professional career ==
After going undrafted in the 2024 NBA draft, LeDee joined the Minnesota Timberwolves for the 2024 NBA Summer League and on September 25, 2024, he signed with the team. However, he was waived on October 2 and on October 25, he joined the Iowa Wolves.

On February 2, 2025, LeDee was traded to the Salt Lake City Stars of the NBA G League in exchange for Babacar Sané.

On June 23, 2025, the Noblesville Boom acquired LeDee and a first-round pick in the 2025 draft from the Salt Lake City Stars in exchange for Cameron McGriff.

On July 1, 2025, the Skyliners Frankfurt acquired LeDee for the 2025–26 season in the EasyCredit BBL.

== Career statistics ==
Legend
GP	Games played	GS	Games started	MPG	Minutes per game
FG%	Field goal percentage	3P%	3-point field goal percentage	FT%	Free throw percentage
RPG	Rebounds per game	APG	Assists per game	SPG	Steals per game
BPG	Blocks per game	PPG	Points per game	**Bold**	Career high

=== College ===
Year	Team	GP	GS	MPG	FG%	3P%	FT%	RPG	APG	SPG	BPG	PPG
2018–19	Ohio State	26	2	6.6	.383	.000	**.745**	1.7	.2	.1	.2	3.0
2019–20	TCU	30	0	11.7	.523	—	.706	2.9	.1	.4	.4	2.7
2020–21	TCU	23	1	15.2	.538	.000	.700	3.9	.3	.3	.1	5.8
2021–22	San Diego State	Redshirt										
2022–23	San Diego State	**39**	1	18.1	.489	.000	.728	5.3	.9	.5	.4	7.9
2023–24	San Diego State	36	**36**	**32.6**	**.560**	**.444**	.734	**8.4**	**1.3**	**1.2**	**.5**	**21.4**
Career		154	40	17.8	.528	.328	.728	4.7	.6	.6	.4	8.9
