= Dave Velasquez =

American basketball coach

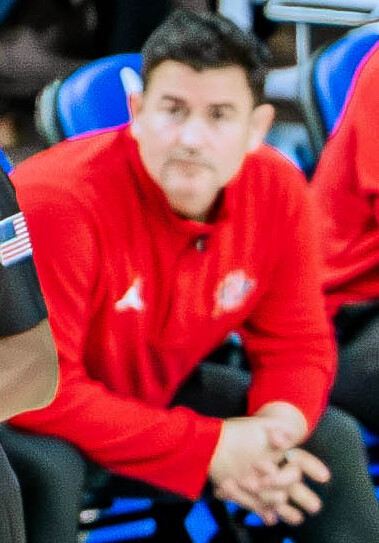
- Velasquez in 2024

Current position
- Title: Assistant coach
- Team: San Diego State
- Conference: Mountain West

Biographical details
- Born: 1983 or 1984 (age 41–42)

Playing career
- 2007: San Diego State

Coaching career (HC unless noted)
- 2002–2007: San Diego State (manager)
- 2007: Pacific (graduate manager)
- 2007–2013: San Diego State (director of player development)
- 2013–present: San Diego State (assistant)

David Velasquez (born 1983/84) is an American college basketball coach who is an assistant coach for San Diego State Aztecs men's basketball team.

== Career ==
Velasquez attended San Diego State University (SDSU), where he initially hoped to walk on to the Aztecs basketball team. His high school best friend's father – then-Stanford head coach Mike Montgomery – had previously recommended him to SDSU head coach Steve Fisher. Velasquez accepted Fisher's offer to become the team's student manager as a freshman in 2002 and was promoted to head manager soon afterwards. He was roommates and close friends with Brandon Heath, waking up early most mornings to work out together.

It really was like the stars were aligning for me. At my first few days at practice, I knew what I wanted to do for the rest of my life. I was sure about what my goals really were. I knew what my dream would be.

— Dave Velasquez

Brandon Heath and I lived together for two years. Lorrenzo Wade and Mohamed Camara were across the street from us. Billy White is like my little brother; D. J. Gay is one of my best friends; and Jamaal Franklin is as much of a family member as anyone I have, really. Those relationships you create off the floor are everything to this business.

— Velasquez describing his close relationships with former players in 2013

Velasquez earned a spot on the scout team and was eventually awarded a scholarship by Fisher in December 2006 for his final semester at the school. He appeared in three games for the Aztecs in February 2007 as a redshirt senior wearing the No. 20 jersey. (Note: Other sources state he appeared in four games and recorded a steal.) Velasquez graduated from SDSU in May 2007. Two days later he was offered a paid assistant position as graduate manager at the University of Pacific (UOP), which he accepted. Velasquez assisted with camps, curated highlight tapes, and coordinated film exchange, although his first assignment with the Tigers was to "clean a rat-infested storage closet".

After four months at Pacific, Velasquez returned to SDSU at Fisher's behest to become the team's director of player development. "I have never driven so fast to San Diego," he said. "I knew I had to go back to my alma mater. Everybody that I built relationships with at UOP understood that it had always been a dream of mine to be a part of this program." One of Velasquez's primary roles during his six years in the position was as video coordinator. Ahead of the 2013–14 season, he was elevated to assistant coach due to health issues with another assistant; Fisher called him an "integral part of the [team's] success". When Fished retired and fellow assistant Brian Dutcher was promoted to head coach in 2017, Velazquez became the longest tenured assistant on the staff.

Velasquez is known for fixing shot mechanics and especially for helping design and oversee the Aztecs' "patented defense", which consistently ranked as one of the best in the nation. When he helped the Aztecs reach the 2023 national championship game, he was described as the team's "de facto defensive coordinator". Velasquez credited Dutcher's off-hands leadership and delegation skills with helping him grow as a coach.

== Personal life ==
Velasquez is the son of Maureen and Rick Velasquez, and is the youngest of three boys. His mother was a teacher and his father was a juvenile probation officer and part-time basketball coach at the high school, college, and professional level, causing him to move around Northern California. When his father was assistant of player personnel for the San Jose Jammers of the Continental Basketball Association, Velasquez served as the team's ball boy.

Velasquez has Irish roots through his mother and Nicaraguan and Mexican roots through his father. He married Lindsay Ward and they have a son, Marcus, as well as a daughter, Harper.
