= Magoon Gwath =

American basketball player (born 2005)

No. 1 – DePaul Blue Demons
- Position: Power forward / center
- Conference: Big East Conference

Personal information
- Born: July 24, 2005 (age 21)
- Listed height: 7 ft 0 in (2.13 m)
- Listed weight: 210 lb (95 kg)

Career information
- High school: Veritas Prep (Garden Grove, California); Trinity (Euless, Texas)
- College: San Diego State (2024–2026); DePaul (2026–present)

Career highlights
- Mountain West Defensive Player of the Year (2025); Mountain West All-Defensive team (2025)

Magoon Gwath (born July 24, 2005) is a South Sudanese-American college basketball player for the DePaul Blue Demons of the Big East Conference. He previously played for the San Diego State Aztecs.

== Early life ==
Gwath grew up in the Dallas metroplex, the son of South Sudanese refugees and the only member of the family born in the United States. Coming out of high school, Gwath committed to play college basketball for the San Diego State Aztecs.

== College career ==
As a freshman in 2023-24, Gwath did not appear in any games, taking a redshirt. On November 12, 2024, he tallied 16 points, a steal, and four blocks in a win over Occidental College. On January 25, 2025, Gwath notched 15 points, 13 rebounds, a steal, and two blocks in a win versus Nevada. On February 15, 2025, he totaled eight points, six rebounds, and six blocks in a 64-47 win over Boise State. Gwath finished his redshirt freshman season in 2024-25 averaging 8.5 points, 5.2 rebounds, and 2.6 blocks per game in 26 starts. He was named the Mountain West Defensive player of the Year and the Mountain West Freshman of the Year. Gwath is considered a top prospect for the NBA draft. He was hampered by injuries during his sophomore season and averaged 8.9 points, 4.3 rebounds and 1.5 blocks per game. Following the season he entered the transfer portal and ultimately landed at DePaul.
