= 2023–24 Utah State Aggies men's basketball team =

American college basketball season

2023–24 Utah State Aggies men's basketball

Cayman Islands Classic champions Mountain West regular-season champions

NCAA tournament, Second Round
- Conference: Mountain West Conference

Ranking
- Coaches: No. 20
- AP: No. 22
- Record: 28–7 (14–4 MW)
- Head coach: Danny Sprinkle (1st season)
- Assistant coaches: Andy Hill; Chris Haslam; Eric Brown
- Home arena: Smith Spectrum

2023–24 Mountain West Conference men's basketball standings
| | Conf. | | | | Overall |
| Team | W | | L | PCT | W | | L | PCT |
|---|---|---|---|---|---|---|---|---|
| No. 22 Utah State | 14 | – | 4 | .778 | 28 | – | 7 | .800 |
| Nevada | 13 | – | 5 | .722 | 26 | – | 8 | .765 |
| Boise State | 13 | – | 5 | .722 | 22 | – | 11 | .667 |
| UNLV | 12 | – | 6 | .667 | 21 | – | 13 | .618 |
| No. 17 San Diego State | 11 | – | 7 | .611 | 26 | – | 11 | .703 |
| New Mexico † | 10 | – | 8 | .556 | 26 | – | 10 | .722 |
| Colorado State | 10 | – | 8 | .556 | 25 | – | 11 | .694 |
| Wyoming | 8 | – | 10 | .444 | 15 | – | 17 | .469 |
| Fresno State | 4 | – | 14 | .222 | 12 | – | 21 | .364 |
| San Jose State | 2 | – | 16 | .111 | 9 | – | 23 | .281 |
| Air Force | 2 | – | 16 | .111 | 9 | – | 22 | .290 |
† 2024 Mountain West tournament winner Rankings from AP Poll

The 2023–24 Utah State Aggies men's basketball team represented Utah State University in the Mountain West Conference (MWC) during the 2023–24 NCAA Division I men's basketball season. Led by first-year head coach Danny Sprinkle in his only season, the Aggies played their home games on campus at the Smith Spectrum in Logan, Utah. They finished the season 28–7, 14–4 in MWC play, to win the regular-season conference championship. They defeated Fresno State in the quarterfinals of the MWC tournament before losing to San Diego State. They received an at-large bid to the NCAA tournament as the No. 8 seed in the Midwest region. They defeated TCU in the first round before losing to No. 1-seeded Purdue.

On March 25, 2024, head coach Sprinkle left the school to become the head coach at Washington.

== Previous season ==
The Aggies finished the 2022–23 season 26–9, 13–5 in MWC play, to finish in second place. They defeated New Mexico and Boise State in the MWC tournament to advance to the championship game. There they lost to San Diego State. The Aggies received an at-large bid to the NCAA tournament as the No. 8 seed in the South region. There they lost to Missouri.

On March 29, 2023, head coach Ryan Odom left the school to become the head coach at VCU. On April 7, the school named Montana State head coach Danny Sprinkle the team's new head coach.

== Offseason ==
=== Departures ===
| Name | Number | Pos. | Height | Weight | Year | Hometown | Reason for departure |
|---|---|---|---|---|---|---|---|
| Sean Bairstow | 2 | G | 6'8" | 190 | Senior | Brisbane, Australia | Graduate transferred to VCU |
| Steven Ashworth | 3 | G | 6'1" | 170 | Junior | Alpine, UT | Transferred to Creighton |
| RJ Eytle-Rock | 5 | G | 6'4" | 225 | RS Senior | London, England | Graduated |
| Cade Potter | 10 | F | 6'8" | 230 | RS Freshman | Orange, CA | Transferred to High Point |
| Max Shulga | 11 | G | 6'4" | 197 | Junior | Kyiv, Ukraine | Transferred to VCU |
| Szymon Zapala | 12 | C | 6'11" | 240 | Junior | Zaborze, Poland | Transferred to Longwood |
| Conner Gillis | 13 | G | 6'2" | 150 | Junior | Charlotte, NC | Walk-on; TBD |
| Connor Odom | 14 | G | 5'11" | 165 | Junior | Annapolis, MD | Walk-on; transferred to Maryland |
| Rylan Jones | 15 | G | 6'0" | 178 | Senior | Salt Lake City, UT | Graduate transferred to Samford |
| Taylor Funk | 23 | F | 6'9" | 220 | GS Senior | Lancaster, PA | Graduated |
| Zee Hamoda | 24 | F | 6'7" | 170 | Sophomore | Riffa, Bahrain | Transferred to Sacramento State |
| Dan Akin | 30 | F | 6'9" | 225 | GS Senior | London, England | Graduated |
| Trevin Dorius | 32 | C | 7'0" | 240 | RS Senior | Heber City, UT | Graduate transferred to Utah Valley |

=== Incoming transfers ===
| Name | Number | Pos. | Height | Weight | Year | Hometown | Previous school |
|---|---|---|---|---|---|---|---|
| Great Osobor | 1 | F | 6'8" | 245 | Junior | Bradford, England | Montana State |
| Ian Martinez | 4 | G | 6'3" | 185 | Senior | Heredia, Costa Rica | Maryland |
| Darius Brown II | 10 | G | 6'2" | 195 | RS Senior | Pasadena, CA | Montana State |
| Josh Uduje | 14 | G | 6'5" | 190 | Junior | London, England | Coastal Carolina |
| Jackson Grant | 21 | F | 6'10" | 205 | Junior | Olympia, WA | Washington |
| Javon Jackson | 22 | G | 6'3" | 190 | Sophomore | Houston, TX | Walk-on; Southern Nazarene |
| Max Agbonkpolo | 23 | G/F | 6'9" | 196 | Senior | Laguna Niguel, CA | Wyoming |
| Kalifa Sakho | 34 | C | 6'11" | | Junior | Rouen, France | South Plains College |
| Nigel Burris | 35 | F | 6'7" | 222 | Sophomore | San Francisco, CA | Idaho |

=== Recruiting classes ===
==== 2023 recruiting class ====
College recruiting
| Name | Hometown | School | Height | Weight | Commit date |
|---|---|---|---|---|---|
| Garrison Phelps; SG | Phoenix, AZ | Link Academy | 6 ft 6 in (1.98 m) | 180 lb (82 kg) | Oct 15, 2022 |
| Garrison Phelps; SG | Recruit ratings: Rivals: 247Sports: (0) | | | | |
| Dallin Grant; SF | Cedar City, UT | Cedar City High School | 6 ft 7 in (2.01 m) | 200 lb (91 kg) | Sep 23, 2020 |
| Dallin Grant; SF | Recruit ratings: Rivals: 247Sports: (0) | | | | |
| Karson Templin; PF | Fairview, TX | Lovejoy High School | 6 ft 8 in (2.03 m) | 217 lb (98 kg) | Oct 28, 2022 |
| Karson Templin; PF | Recruit ratings: Rivals: 247Sports: (0) | | | | |
Overall recruit ranking: Scout: – Rivals: – 247Sports: #65
Note: In many cases, Scout, Rivals, 247Sports, On3, and ESPN may conflict in their listings of height and weight.; In these cases, the average was taken. ESPN grades are on a 100-point scale.; Sources: "2023 Team Ranking". Rivals.

==== 2024 recruiting class ====
College recruiting (2023)
| Name | Hometown | School | Height | Weight | Commit date |
|---|---|---|---|---|---|
| Kase Wynott; SF | Winchester, ID | Lapwai High School | 6 ft 6 in (1.98 m) | N/A | Jul 1, 2023 |
| Kase Wynott; SF | Recruit ratings: Rivals: 247Sports: (0) | | | | |
Overall recruit ranking: Scout: – Rivals: – 247Sports: #65
Note: In many cases, Scout, Rivals, 247Sports, On3, and ESPN may conflict in their listings of height and weight.; In these cases, the average was taken. ESPN grades are on a 100-point scale.; Sources: "2024 Team Ranking". Rivals.

== Roster ==
2023–24 Utah State Aggies men's basketball team
Players
Coaches

| Pos. | # | Name | Height | Weight | Year | Previous school | Hometown |
|---|---|---|---|---|---|---|---|
| G | 0 | Landon Brenchley (W) | 6 ft 4 in (1.93 m) | 209 lb (95 kg) | RS So | Ridgeline HS | Providence, UT |
| G/F | 1 | Great Osobor | 6 ft 8 in (2.03 m) | 250 lb (113 kg) | Jr | Myerscough College; Montana State | Bradford, England |
| G | 2 | Garrison Phelps | 6 ft 6 in (1.98 m) | 192 lb (87 kg) | Fr | St. Mary's Catholic | Phoenix, AZ |
| G | 3 | Jaxon Smith (W) | 6 ft 2 in (1.88 m) | 188 lb (85 kg) | Fr | Woods Cross HS | Bountiful, UT |
| G | 4 | Ian Martinez | 6 ft 3 in (1.91 m) | 185 lb (84 kg) | Sr | Junípero Serra Catholic HS; Maryland | Heredia, Costa Rica |
| G | 10 | Darius Brown II | 6 ft 2 in (1.88 m) | 195 lb (88 kg) | RS Sr | Pasadena HS; Montana State | Pasadena, CA |
| G/F | 11 | Dallin Grant | 6 ft 8 in (2.03 m) | 218 lb (99 kg) | Fr | Cedar HS | Cedar City, UT |
| G | 12 | Mason Falslev | 6 ft 3 in (1.91 m) | 203 lb (92 kg) | RS Fr | Sky View HS | Benson, UT |
| G | 14 | Josh Uduje | 6 ft 5 in (1.96 m) | 189 lb (86 kg) | Jr | Arizona Compass Preparatory; Coastal Carolina | London, England |
| C | 20 | Isaac Johnson | 7 ft 0 in (2.13 m) | 227 lb (103 kg) | RS So | American Fork HS; Oregon | American Fork, UT |
| F | 21 | Jackson Grant | 6 ft 10 in (2.08 m) | 226 lb (103 kg) | Jr | Olympia HS; Washington | Olympia, WA |
| G | 22 | Javon Jackson | 6 ft 3 in (1.91 m) | 190 lb (86 kg) | So | C.E. King HS; Southern Nazarene | Houston, TX |
| G/F | 23 | Max Agbonkpolo | 6 ft 9 in (2.06 m) | 194 lb (88 kg) | Sr | Santa Margarita HS; Wyoming | Laguna Niguel, CA |
| F | 24 | Karson Templin | 6 ft 8 in (2.03 m) | 217 lb (98 kg) | Fr | Lovejoy HS | Fairview, TX |
| F | 34 | Kalifa Sakho | 6 ft 11 in (2.11 m) | 220 lb (100 kg) | Jr | South Plains College | Rouen, France |
| F | 35 | Nigel Burris | 6 ft 7 in (2.01 m) | 224 lb (102 kg) | So | Archbishop Mitty HS; Idaho | San Francisco, CA |

Head coach

- Danny Sprinkle (Montana State)

Assistant coach(es)

- Andy Hill (Eastern Washington)
- Chris Haslam (Wyoming)
- Eric Brown (Cal State Fullerton)

Legend

- (C) Team captain
- (S) Suspended
- (I) Ineligible
- (W) Walk-on
- Injured
- Current redshirt

Roster
Last update: August 7, 2024

== Schedule and results ==
| Date time, TV | Rank^{#} | Opponent^{#} | Result | Record | High points | High rebounds | High assists | Site (attendance) city, state |
Exhibition
| November 3, 2023*; 7:00 p.m., KMYU | | Montana State Billings | W 73–64 | − | 23 – Falslev | 8 – Sakho | 7 – Brown II | Smith Spectrum (4,825); Logan, UT |
Non-conference regular season
| November 6, 2023*; 7:30 p.m., KMYU | | South Dakota Mines | W 101–48 | 1–0 | 19 – Uduje | 9 – Osobor | 7 – Brown II | Smith Spectrum (10,270); Logan, UT |
| November 11, 2023*; 6:00 p.m., KMYU | | at Bradley | L 66–72 ^{OT} | 1–1 | 22 – Osobor | 8 – Brown II | 8 – Brown II | Carver Arena (5,845); Peoria, IL |
| November 14, 2023*; 7:00 p.m., KMYU | | Southern Utah | W 93–84 | 2–1 | 31 – Osobor | 10 – Osobor | 8 – Brown II | Smith Spectrum (7,112); Logan, UT |
| November 19, 2023*; 3:00 p.m., FloSports | | vs. Marshall; Cayman Islands Classic quarterfinals | W 83–60 | 3–1 | 18 – Osobor | 16 – Osobor | 8 – Brown II | John Gray Gymnasium; George Town, Cayman Islands |
| November 20, 2023*; 5:30 p.m., FloSports | | vs. Akron; Cayman Islands Classic semifinals | W 65–62 | 4–1 | 24 – Osobor | 11 – Osobor | 6 – Brown II | John Gray Gymnasium (1,200); George Town, Cayman Islands |
| November 21, 2023*; 5:30 p.m., FloSports | | vs. Stephen F. Austin; Cayman Islands Classic championship | W 79–49 | 5–1 | 19 – Falslev | 9 – Falslev | 10 – Brown II | John Gray Gymnasium (1,531); George Town, Cayman Islands |
| November 28, 2023*; 6:00 p.m., ESPN+ | | at Saint Louis | W 81–76 | 6–1 | 24 – Osobor | 13 – Osobor | 7 – Brown II | Chaifetz Arena (4,721); St. Louis, MO |
| December 2, 2023*; 7:00 p.m., KMYU | | UC Irvine | W 79–69 | 7–1 | 19 – Falslev | 7 – Agbonkpolo | 9 – Brown II | Smith Spectrum (7,880); Logan, UT |
| December 6, 2023*; 7:00 p.m., KMYU | | San Diego | W 108–81 | 8–1 | 17 – Falslev | 4 – tied | 6 – Brown II | Smith Spectrum (7,078); Logan, UT |
| December 9, 2023*; 7:00 p.m., KMYU | | Northwest Nazarene | W 84–53 | 9–1 | 17 – Osobor | 10 – Osobor | 11 – Brown II | Smith Spectrum (4,950); Logan, UT |
| December 13, 2023*; 8:00 p.m., ESPN+ | | at Santa Clara | W 84–82 | 10–1 | 28 – Martinez | 10 – Osobor | 7 – Brown II | Leavey Center (1,107); Santa Clara, CA |
| December 16, 2023*; 2:00 p.m., KMYU | | vs. San Francisco | W 54–53 | 11–1 | 20 – Martinez | 8 – tied | 4 – Brown II | Delta Center (4,352); Salt Lake City, UT |
| December 22, 2023*; 7:00 p.m., KMYU | | East Tennessee State | W 80–65 | 12–1 | 19 – Brown II | 10 – tied | 8 – Brown II | Smith Spectrum (6,804); Logan, UT |
Mountain West regular season
| January 2, 2024; 2:00 p.m., KMYU | | at Air Force | W 88–60 | 13–1 (1–0) | 32 – Osobor | 9 – Osobor | 8 – Brown II | Clune Arena (945); Colorado Springs, CO |
| January 6, 2024; 7:00 p.m., KMYU | | No. 13 Colorado State | W 77–72 | 14–1 (2–0) | 20 – Osobor | 14 – Osobor | 3 – tied | Smith Spectrum (10,270); Logan, UT |
| January 9, 2024; 7:00 p.m., KMYU | No. 20 | Wyoming | W 83–59 | 15–1 (3–0) | 20 – Osobor | 8 – Osobor | 11 – Brown II | Smith Spectrum (8,214); Logan, UT |
| January 13, 2024; 1:00 p.m., CBSSN | No. 20 | at UNLV | W 87–86 | 16–1 (4–0) | 24 – tied | 14 – Osobor | 5 – Martinez | Thomas & Mack Center (5,992); Paradise, NV |
| January 16, 2024; 8:30 p.m., FS1 | No. 16 | at New Mexico | L 86–99 | 16–2 (4–1) | 22 – Martinez | 9 – Falslev | 5 – Brown II | The Pit (13,106); Albuquerque, NM |
| January 20, 2024; 7:00 p.m., KMYU | No. 16 | Fresno State | W 83–62 | 17–2 (5–1) | 20 – Osobor | 12 – Osobor | 6 – Martinez | Smith Spectrum (8,851); Logan, UT |
| January 27, 2024; 2:00 p.m., MW Network | No. 18 | at Boise State | W 90–84 ^{OT} | 18–2 (6–1) | 19 – Brown II | 11 – Johnson | 7 – Osobor | ExtraMile Arena (12,058); Boise, ID |
| January 30, 2024; 7:00 p.m., KMYU | No. 17 | San Jose State | W 82–61 | 19–2 (7–1) | 31 – Osobor | 10 – Brown II | 5 – Brown II | Smith Spectrum (8,599); Logan, UT |
| February 3, 2024; 1:30 p.m., FOX | No. 17 | at San Diego State | L 67–81 | 19–3 (7–2) | 17 – Osobor | 8 – Brown II | 5 – tied | Viejas Arena (12,414); San Diego, CA |
| February 6, 2024; 7:00 p.m., KMYU | No. 22 | Nevada | L 63–77 | 19–4 (7–3) | 16 – Martinez | 5 – tied | 4 – tied | Smith Spectrum (8,860); Logan, UT |
| February 10, 2024; 8:00 p.m., FS1 | No. 22 | Boise State | W 80–61 | 20–4 (8–3) | 25 – Falslev | 10 – Osobor | 5 – Brown II | Smith Spectrum (10,270); Logan, UT |
| February 14, 2024; 8:00 p.m., FS1 | | at Wyoming | W 84–76 | 21–4 (9–3) | 24 – Brown II | 8 – Brown II | 5 – Brown II | Arena-Auditorium (3,401); Laramie, WY |
| February 17, 2024; 5:30 p.m., CBSSN | | at Colorado State | L 55–75 | 21–5 (9–4) | 15 – Osobor | 13 – Osobor | 5 – Brown II | Moby Arena (8,083); Fort Collins, CO |
| February 20, 2024; 7:00 p.m., CBSSN | | No. 19 San Diego State | W 68–63 | 22–5 (10–4) | 25 – Brown II | 7 – Osobor | 7 – Osobor | Smith Spectrum (9,233); Logan, UT |
| February 27, 2024; 8:00 p.m., MW Network | No. 22 | at Fresno State | W 77–73 ^{OT} | 23–5 (11–4) | 21 – Osobor | 11 – tied | 6 – Brown II | Save Mart Center (3,785); Fresno, CA |
| March 2, 2024; 9:00 p.m., FS1 | No. 22 | Air Force | W 72–60 | 24–5 (12–4) | 21 – Martinez | 6 – tied | 5 – Falslev | Smith Spectrum (9,194); Logan, UT |
| March 5, 2024; 8:30 p.m., CBSSN | No. 22 | at San Jose State | W 90–70 | 25–5 (13–4) | 21 – Brown II | 8 – Osobor | 9 – Brown II | Provident Credit Union Event Center (2,851); San Jose, CA |
| March 9, 2024; 6:30 p.m., CBSSN | No. 22 | New Mexico | W 87–85 | 26–5 (14–4) | 22 – Martinez | 12 – Osobor | 9 – Brown II | Smith Spectrum (10,270); Logan, UT |
Mountain West tournament
| March 14, 2024; 1:00 p.m., CBSSN | (1) No. 18 | vs. (9) Fresno State; Quarterfinals | W 87–75 ^{OT} | 27–5 | 29 – Osobor | 17 – Osobor | 11 – Brown II | Thomas & Mack Center; Paradise, NV |
| March 15, 2024; 7:30 p.m., CBSSN | (1) No. 18 | vs. (5) San Diego State; Semifinals | L 70–86 | 27–6 | 19 – Osobor | 5 – tied | 5 – Brown II | Thomas & Mack Center; Paradise, NV |
NCAA tournament
| March 22, 2024; 7:55 p.m., TBS | (8 MW) No. 20 | vs. (9 MW) TCU; First Round | W 88–72 | 28–6 | 21 – Martinez | 7 – Osobor | 10 – Brown | Gainbridge Fieldhouse (16,668); Indianapolis, IN |
| March 24, 2024; 12:40 p.m., CBS | (8 MW) No. 20 | vs. (1 MW) No. 3 Purdue; Second Round | L 67–106 | 28–7 | 14 – Osobor | 6 – Osobor | 4 – Brown II | Gainbridge Fieldhouse (16,770); Indianapolis, IN |
*Non-conference game. ^{#}Rankings from AP poll. (#) Tournament seedings in parentheses. MW=Midwest. All times are in Mountain.

== Rankings ==
Ranking movements Legend: ██ Increase in ranking ██ Decrease in ranking — = Not ranked RV = Received votes
| | Week | | | | | | | | | | | | | | | | | | | | |
| Poll | Pre | 1 | 2 | 3 | 4 | 5 | 6 | 7 | 8 | 9 | 10 | 11 | 12 | 13 | 14 | 15 | 16 | 17 | 18 | 19 | Final |
|---|---|---|---|---|---|---|---|---|---|---|---|---|---|---|---|---|---|---|---|---|---|
| AP | — | — | — | — | — | — | — | — | — | 20 | 16 | 18 | 17 | 22 | RV | RV | 22 | 22 | 18 | 20 | 22 |
| Coaches | — | — | — | — | — | — | — | — | — | 23 | 17 | 20 | 17 | 21 | RV | RV | 23 | 22 | 18 | 19 | 20 |

== See also ==
- 2023–24 Utah State Aggies women's basketball team
