= Danny Sprinkle =

American basketball coach

Current position
- Title: Head coach
- Team: Washington
- Conference: Big Ten
- Record: 29–35 (.453)

Biographical details
- Born: October 12, 1976 (age 50); Pullman, Washington, U.S.

Playing career
- 1995–1999: Montana State

Coaching career (HC unless noted)
- 2000–2006: Cal State Northridge (assistant)
- 2006–2008: Montana State (assistant)
- 2008–2013: Cal State Northridge (assistant)
- 2013–2019: Cal State Fullerton (assistant)
- 2019–2023: Montana State
- 2023–2024: Utah State
- 2024–present: Washington

Head coaching record
- Overall: 138–85 (.619)
- Tournaments: 1–3 (NCAA Division I)

Accomplishments and honors

Championships
- Big Sky regular season (2022); 2 Big Sky tournament (2022, 2023); Mountain West regular season (2024)

Awards
- MWC Coach of the Year (2024); Big Sky Coach of the Year (2022)

Danny Sprinkle (born October 12, 1976) is an American college basketball coach. He is the head coach at the University of Washington. He was previously the head coach at his alma mater, Montana State University, and Utah State University.

== Playing career ==
A two-time all-state selection in Montana at Helena High School, Sprinkle played college basketball at Montana State University in Bozeman, where he was conference freshman of the year in 1996, and earned all-league honors in 1997. He graduated as the school's seventh-all-time-leading scorer.

== Coaching career ==
Sprinkle's first coaching job came in 2000 as an assistant at Cal State Northridge, where he stayed for six seasons. He returned to Montana State for a two-year stint as an assistant under new head coach Brad Huse, then went back to Northridge in 2008 for five seasons. Sprinkle joined Dedrique Taylor's staff at Cal State Fullerton in 2013, and was part of the Titans' NCAA tournament squad in 2018.

On April 4, 2019, Sprinkle was hired at his alma mater, succeeding Brian Fish and becoming the 23rd head coach of the men's program at Montana State.

Sprinkle led his team to a 16–15 record for the 2019–20 season and a #5 seed in the Big Sky tournament before it was shut down for the COVID-19 pandemic. The 2020–21 shortened season saw Sprinkle lead the Bobcats to knock off #1 seeded Southern Utah and advance to the Big Sky championship game, losing to Eastern Washington. Sprinkle successfully brought back his three COVID-eligible seniors for the 2021–22 campaign, culminating in a school-record 27 wins and the first trip to the NCAA tournament for the Bobcats since Sprinkle's freshman season. Sprinkle's final season in Bozeman saw him bringing Montana State to back-to-back NCAA tournaments for the first time in program history.

After four seasons at Montana State, he was hired by Utah State to be their new head coach on April 7, 2023, succeeding Ryan Odom.

On March 25, 2024, Sprinkle was hired by Washington to replace Mike Hopkins.

== Head coaching record ==
Record table
| Season | Team | Overall | Conference | Standing | Postseason |
|---|---|---|---|---|---|
Montana State Bobcats (Big Sky Conference) (2019–2023)
| 2019–20 | Montana State | 16–15 | 10–10 | T–5th | |
| 2020–21 | Montana State | 13–10 | 8–6 | T–4th | |
| 2021–22 | Montana State | 27–8 | 16–4 | 1st | NCAA Division I Round of 64 |
| 2022–23 | Montana State | 25–10 | 15–3 | 2nd | NCAA Division I Round of 64 |
| Montana State: | | 81–43 (.653) | 49–23 (.681) | | |
Utah State Aggies (Mountain West Conference) (2023–2024)
| 2023–24 | Utah State | 28–7 | 14–4 | 1st | NCAA Division I Round of 32 |
| Utah State: | | 28–7 (.800) | 14–4 (.778) | | |
Washington Huskies (Big Ten Conference) (2024–present)
| 2024–25 | Washington | 13–18 | 4–16 | 18th | |
| 2025–26 | Washington | 16–17 | 7–13 | T–12th | |
| Washington: | | 29–35 (.453) | 11–29 (.275) | | |
| Total: | | 138–85 (.619) | | | |
National champion Postseason invitational champion Conference regular season champion Conference regular season and conference tournament champion Division regular season champion Division regular season and conference tournament champion Conference tournament champion
