= Lamont Butler =

American basketball player (born 2002)

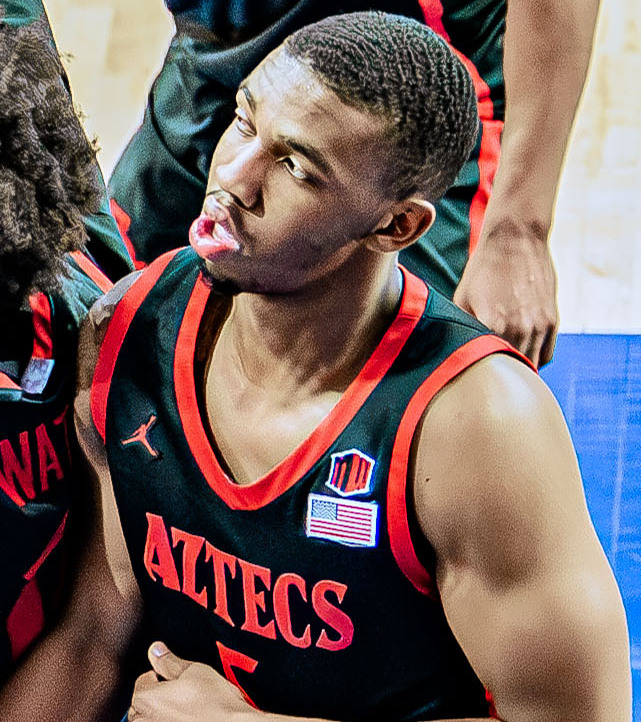
- Butler with San Diego State in 2024

No. 15 – College Park Skyhawks
- Position: Point guard
- League: NBA G League

Personal information
- Born: June 9, 2002 (age 24) Moreno Valley, California, U.S.
- Listed height: 6 ft 2 in (1.88 m)
- Listed weight: 205 lb (93 kg)

Career information
- High school: Riverside Polytechnic (Riverside, California)
- College: San Diego State (2020–2024); Kentucky (2024–2025)
- NBA draft: 2025: undrafted
- Playing career: 2025–present

Career history
- 2026–present: College Park Skyhawks

Career highlights
- Mountain West Defensive Player of the Year (2024); Third-team All-Mountain West (2023); 3× Mountain West All-Defensive Team (2022–2024)
- Stats at NBA.com
- Stats at Basketball Reference

Lamont Butler Jr. (born June 9, 2002) is an American professional basketball player for the College Park Skyhawks of the NBA G League. He played college basketball for the Kentucky Wildcats and San Diego State Aztecs, the latter of whom he led to a berth in the 2023 National Championship game.

== Early life and high school career ==
Butler grew up in and Moreno Valley, California and attended Riverside Polytechnic High School. He was a four-year starter for the school and broke the school's career scoring record, which was previously held by Reggie Miller. Butler was rated a three-star recruit and committed to playing college basketball for San Diego State over offers from Saint Mary's, Stanford, Washington, California, Colorado, USC, Boise State, and Utah State.

== College career ==
Butler played in 28 games with two starts during his freshman season at San Diego State, averaging 4.3 points and 1.7 rebounds per game. He started 25 games as a sophomore and averaged 7.3 points and 2.1 rebounds per game and was named to the Mountain West Conference All-Defensive team. Butler missed several games due to a broken wrist. He was named third-team All-Mountain West and repeated as an All-Defensive selection during his junior season. In the semifinal of the 2023 NCAA tournament, Butler hit a buzzer-beating jump shot as time expired to beat Florida Atlantic 72–71 and send the Aztecs to the 2023 national championship game. He averaged 8.8 points, 3.2 assists, and 2.7 rebounds per game. After the season, Butler entered his name into the 2023 NBA draft, but ultimately withdrew in order to return to San Diego State for his senior season.

Butler averaged 9.3 points, 2.6 rebounds, 3.0 assists and 1.5 steals per game as a senior. Eligible for a fifth year due to COVID interruptions to his college career, Butler transferred to Kentucky.

== Professional career ==
On September 24, 2025, Butler signed a training camp contract with the Atlanta Hawks. He was waived by Atlanta prior to the start of the regular season on October 18.

On September 10, 2026, Butler signed an Exhibit 10 contract with the Hawks. He was waived by Atlanta on September 19. Butler was eventually assigned to the Hawks' NBA G League affiliate, the College Park Skyhawks.

== Career statistics ==
Legend
GP	Games played	GS	Games started	MPG	Minutes per game
FG%	Field goal percentage	3P%	3-point field goal percentage	FT%	Free throw percentage
RPG	Rebounds per game	APG	Assists per game	SPG	Steals per game
BPG	Blocks per game	PPG	Points per game	**Bold**	Career high

=== College ===
Year	Team	GP	GS	MPG	FG%	3P%	FT%	RPG	APG	SPG	BPG	PPG
2020–21	San Diego State	28	2	12.4	.396	.290	.667	1.7	1.5	.9	.0	4.3
2021–22	San Diego State	27	25	25.4	.391	.329	**.773**	2.1	2.1	**1.7**	.1	7.3
2022–23	San Diego State	**39**	**38**	25.9	.421	.342	.731	2.7	3.2	1.5	.1	8.8
2023–24	San Diego State	37	37	**27.5**	.421	.302	.594	2.6	3.0	1.5	**.2**	9.3
2024–25	Kentucky	27	27	26.0	**.498**	**.391**	.735	**2.9**	**4.3**	1.6	**.2**	**11.4**
Career		158	129	23.8	.428	.333	.691	2.4	2.9	1.4	.2	8.3

== Personal life ==
Butler's sister, Asasha Hall, was shot and killed in a domestic dispute on January 25, 2022.
