= 2023–24 San Jose State Spartans men's basketball team =

American college basketball season

2023–24 San Jose State Spartans men's basketball
- Conference: Mountain West Conference
- Record: 9–23 (2–16 MW)
- Head coach: Tim Miles (3rd season)
- Assistant coaches: Damany Hendrix; Jeff Strohm; Ed Gipson
- Home arena: Provident Credit Union Event Center (Capacity: 5,000)

2023–24 Mountain West Conference men's basketball standings
	Conf.				Overall
Team	W		L	PCT	W		L	PCT
No. 22 Utah State	14	–	4	.778	28	–	7	.800
Nevada	13	–	5	.722	26	–	8	.765
Boise State	13	–	5	.722	22	–	11	.667
UNLV	12	–	6	.667	21	–	13	.618
No. 17 San Diego State	11	–	7	.611	26	–	11	.703
New Mexico †	10	–	8	.556	26	–	10	.722
Colorado State	10	–	8	.556	25	–	11	.694
Wyoming	8	–	10	.444	15	–	17	.469
Fresno State	4	–	14	.222	12	–	21	.364
San Jose State	2	–	16	.111	9	–	23	.281
Air Force	2	–	16	.111	9	–	22	.290
† 2024 Mountain West tournament winner Rankings from AP Poll

The 2023–24 San Jose State Spartans men's basketball team represented San Jose State University during the 2023–24 NCAA Division I men's basketball season. They were led by third-year head coach Tim Miles and played their games at Provident Credit Union Event Center as members of the Mountain West Conference.

== Previous season ==
The Spartans finished the season 24–14, 10–8 in conference play to finish in fifth place. They defeated Nevada in the quarterfinals of the MWC tournament before being falling to top-seeded San Diego State in the semifinals. The Spartans received an invitation to compete in the College Basketball Invitational, their first postseason tournament since 2011. In the opening round, they defeated Southern Indiana, marking the Spartans' first ever postseason victory, before losing to Radford in the quarterfinals.

With a final overall record of 21–14, the season marked school's most successful season since 1980–81.

== Offseason ==
=== Departures ===
Name	Number	Pos.	Height	Weight	Year	Hometown	Reason for departure
Max Allen	2	F	6'9"	260	Freshman	Las Vegas, NV	Transferred to Marist
Leo Torbor	4	G	6'4"	175	Freshman	Brooklyn Center, MN	Entered transfer portal
Ibrahima Diallo	5	C	7'0"	220	RS Junior	Saly, Senegal	Transferred to UCF
Omari Moore	10	F	6'6"	195	RS Junior	Pasadena, California	Declared for NBA Draft
J.T. Elder	11	G	6'7"	190	Freshman	Tucson, AZ	Left program
Kellen King	20	F	6'4"	190	RS Senior	Brentwood, TN	Walk-on; Graduated
Nico D'Augsta	21	F	6'5"	200	Freshman	San Jose, CA	Walk-on; left program
Sage Tolbert III	23	F	6'8"	210	RS Senior	New Orleans, LA	Graduated
Kevin Simeth	33	F	6'4"	207	Freshman	Geneva, Switzerland	Entered transfer portal

=== Incoming transfers ===
Name	Number	Pos.	Height	Weight	Year	Hometown	Previous college
Adrame Diongue	4	C	7'0"	190	Sophomore	Dakar, Senegal	Washington State

=== 2023 recruiting class ===
College recruiting
Name	Hometown	School	Height	Weight	Commit date
Pasha Goodarzi; SG	Los Gatos, CA	Valley Christian High School	6 ft 3 in (1.91 m)	190 lb (86 kg)	Oct 15, 2022
Pasha Goodarzi; SG	Recruit ratings: Scout: Rivals: 247Sports: ESPN: (NR)				
William Humer; SF	Sollentuna, Sweden	-	6 ft 10 in (2.08 m)	228 lb (103 kg)	Nov 14, 2022
William Humer; SF	Recruit ratings: Scout: Rivals: 247Sports: ESPN: (NR)				
Diego Seixas; SG	Lisbon, Portugal	212 Sports Academy	6 ft 8 in (2.03 m)	235 lb (107 kg)	Feb 5, 2023
Diego Seixas; SG	Recruit ratings: Scout: Rivals: 247Sports: ESPN: (NR)				
Overall recruit ranking: Scout: – Rivals: –
Note: In many cases, Scout, Rivals, 247Sports, On3, and ESPN may conflict in their listings of height and weight.; In these cases, the average was taken. ESPN grades are on a 100-point scale.; Sources: "2022 San Jose State Basketball Recruiting Commits". Scout.; "Scout.com Team Recruiting Rankings". Scout.; "2023 Team Ranking". Rivals.

== Roster ==
2023–24 San Jose State Spartans men's basketball team
Players
Coaches

Pos.	#	Name	Height	Weight	Year	Previous school	Hometown
G	0	M. J. Amey Jr.	6 ft 2 in (1.88 m)	185 lb (84 kg)	Jr	Scotland Prep (Pa.)	Vacaville, California
G	1	Garrett Anderson	6 ft 6 in (1.98 m)	185 lb (84 kg)	So	PHH Prep	Phoenix, Arizona
G	2	Ricky Mitchell Jr.	6 ft 4 in (1.93 m)	172 lb (78 kg)	Fr	Smoky Hill HS	Aurora, Colorado
C	4	Adrame Diongue	7 ft 0 in (2.13 m)	190 lb (86 kg)	So	Arizona Compass Prep; Washington State	Dakar, Senegal
F	5	Tibet Görener	6 ft 9 in (2.06 m)	205 lb (93 kg)	RS Jr	Orange Lutheran HS (CA); Arizona	Istanbul, Turkey
F	6	Latrell Davis	6 ft 2 in (1.88 m)	195 lb (88 kg)	Fr	First Baptist Academy (FL)	Leeds, England
G	7	Pasha Goodarzi	6 ft 3 in (1.91 m)	190 lb (86 kg)	RS Fr	Valley Christian HS	Los Gatos, California
G	8	Iggy Mitchell	6 ft 2 in (1.88 m)	200 lb (91 kg)	Fr	-	Sydney, Australia
G	13	Alvaro Cardenas Torre	6 ft 1 in (1.85 m)	182 lb (83 kg)	Jr	Get Better Academy	Granada, Spain
F	15	Trey Anderson	6 ft 7 in (2.01 m)	200 lb (91 kg)	RS Sr	Mater Dei Catholic; South Carolina	San Diego, California
F	20	Christian Wise	6 ft 6 in (1.98 m)	205 lb (93 kg)	RS Fr	Archbishop Riordan HS	San Francisco, California
F	21	William Humer	6 ft 10 in (2.08 m)	228 lb (103 kg)	So	McCook CC	Sollentuna, Sweden
F	22	Robert Vaihola	6 ft 8 in (2.03 m)	260 lb (118 kg)	Jr	Archbishop Riordan HS; Fresno State	San Mateo, California
F	23	Diogo Seixas	6 ft 8 in (2.03 m)	235 lb (107 kg)	Fr	212 Sports Academy	Lisbon, Portugal
G	24	Bennett Blackerby	6 ft 0 in (1.83 m)	180 lb (82 kg)	Fr	L.C. Anderson HS	Austin, Texas
G	25	Ryen Perry	6 ft 2 in (1.88 m)	188 lb (85 kg)	Jr	Fullerton College	Placentia, California

Head coach

- Tim Miles (Mary)

Assistant coach(es)

- Damany Hendrix (Lamar)
- Jeff Strohm (Eastern Illinois)
- Ed Gipson (Calumet College)

Legend

- (C) Team captain
- (S) Suspended
- (I) Ineligible
- (W) Walk-on
- Injured
- Current redshirt

Roster

== Schedule and results ==
Date time, TV	Rank^{#}	Opponent^{#}	Result	Record	High points	High rebounds	High assists	Site (attendance) city, state
Exhibition
November 4, 2023*; 4:00 p.m.		Cal State East Bay	W 77–61	–	18 – Gorener	8 – Humer	9 – Cardenas	Provident Credit Union Event Center (1,275); San Jose, CA
Non-conference regular season
November 7, 2023*; 7:00 p.m., MW Network		UC Irvine	W 72–64	1–0	19 – T. Anderson	5 – Tied	7 – Cardenas	Provident Credit Union Event Center (1,821); San Jose, CA
November 9, 2023*; 8:00 p.m., NBCSBA		Bethesda	W 117–72	2–0	26 – Gorener	11 – Diongue	8 – Cardenas	Provident Credit Union Event Center (1,484); San Jose, CA
November 12, 2023*; 11:00 a.m., ESPN+		at Texas Tech	L 42–56	2–1	14 – Cardenas	6 – Diongue	4 – Cardenas	United Supermarkets Arena (10,443); Lubbock, TX
November 17, 2023*; 12:15 p.m., ESPN+		vs. Abilene Christian; Paradise Jam quarterfinals	L 71–77	2–2	21 – Amey Jr.	9 – Diongue	5 – Tied	Sports and Fitness Center (524); Saint Thomas, USVI
November 18, 2023*; 12:15 p.m., ESPN+		vs. Norfolk State; Paradise Jam Consolation 2nd Round	W 77–53	3–2	16 – T. Anderson	10 – T. Anderson	5 – Tied	Sports and Fitness Center (–); Saint Thomas, USVI
November 20, 2023*; 12:15 p.m., ESPN+		vs. Hampton; Paradise Jam 5th Place Game	W 71–52	4–2	23 – Cardenas	9 – Diongue	4 – Tied	Sports and Fitness Center (376); Saint Thomas, USVI
November 27, 2023*; 8:00 p.m., MW Network		North Dakota State	W 78–65	5–2	21 – T. Anderson	10 – Amey Jr.	7 – Cardenas	Provident Credit Union Event Center (1,322); San Jose, CA
November 29, 2023*; 7:00 p.m., ESPN+		at Cal Poly	L 77–81 ^{OT}	5–3	22 – Amey Jr.	9 – Gorener	4 – Cardenas	Mott Athletics Center (1,352); San Luis Obispo, CA
December 2, 2023*; 1:00 p.m., ESPN+		at Montana	L 58–75	5–4	11 – Humer	7 – Gorener	5 – Cardenas	Dahlberg Arena (2,524); Missoula, MT
December 4, 2023*; 5:00 p.m., MW Network		at North Dakota State	L 78–83 ^{OT}	5–5	22 – Cardenas	10 – Cardenas	4 – Tied	Scheels Center (1,946); Fargo, ND
December 9, 2023*; 2:00 p.m., MW Network		New Orleans	W 87–82	6–5	29 – Amey Jr.	7 – Amey Jr.	10 – Cardenas	Provident Credit Union Event Center (1,747); San Jose, CA
December 17, 2023*; 2:00 p.m., MW Network		Montana	L 75–86	6–6	15 – Amey Jr.	6 – Tied	4 – Tied	Provident Credit Union Event Center (1,701); San Jose, CA
December 20, 2023*; 7:00 p.m., NBCSBA		Santa Clara	W 81–78	7–6	17 – Amey Jr.	9 – Amey Jr.	10 – Cardenas	Provident Credit Union Event Center (2,135); San Jose, CA
Mountain West regular season
January 2, 2024; 7:00 p.m., MW Network		at Wyoming	L 73–75	7–7 (0–1)	21 – Cardenas	9 – Cardenas	4 – Cardenas	Arena-Auditorium (3,368); Laramie, WY
January 5, 2024; 7:30 p.m., FS1		Boise State	L 69–78	7–8 (0–2)	30 – Amey Jr.	6 – Amey Jr.	7 – Cardenas	Provident Credit Union Event Center (2,287); San Jose, CA
January 9, 2024; 8:00 p.m., CBSSN		No. 19 San Diego State	L 78–81	7–9 (0–3)	21 – Cardenas	6 – T. Anderson	6 – Cardenas	Provident Credit Union Event Center (4,299); San Jose, CA
January 13, 2024; 6:30 p.m., MW Network		at Air Force	W 70–67	8–9 (1–3)	16 – Amey Jr.	9 – Amey Jr.	9 – Cardenas	Clune Arena (1,804); Colorado Springs, CO
January 16, 2024; 7:00 p.m., MW Network		at Fresno State	L 82–85	8–10 (1–4)	32 – Gorener	9 – Diongue	6 – Cardenas	Save Mart Center (3,146); Fresno, CA
January 24, 2024; 8:00 p.m., CBSSN		No. 25 New Mexico	L 75–95	8–11 (1–5)	24 – Amey Jr.	9 – Amey Jr.	10 – Cardenas	Provident Credit Union Event Center (3,118); San Jose, CA
January 27, 2024; 7:00 p.m., FS1		UNLV	L 65–77	8–12 (1–6)	18 – Amey Jr.	5 – Amey Jr.	6 – Cardenas	Provident Credit Union Event Center (2,982); San Jose, CA
January 30, 2024; 6:00 p.m., MW Network		at No. 17 Utah State	L 61–82	8–13 (1–7)	14 – Amey Jr.	7 – Tied	5 – Cardenas	Smith Spectrum (8,599); Logan, UT
February 2, 2024; 8:00 p.m., FS1		at Nevada	L 60–90	8–14 (1–8)	14 – Cardenas	6 – Tied	4 – Amey Jr.	Lawlor Events Center (8,512); Reno, NV
February 6, 2024; 7:00 p.m., NBCSBA		Fresno State	L 57–69	8–15 (1–9)	12 – Cardenas	8 – Wise	4 – Amey Jr.	Provident Credit Union Event Center (3,284); San Jose, CA
February 9, 2024; 6:30 p.m., FS1		at Colorado State	L 47–66	8–16 (1–10)	14 – Cardenas	7 – T. Anderson	5 – Cardenas	Moby Arena (7,783); Fort Collins, CO
February 13, 2024; 7:00 p.m., NBCSBA		Air Force	W 73–66	9–16 (2–10)	25 – Amey Jr.	4 – Amey Jr.	4 – G. Anderson	Provident Credit Union Event Center (1,722); San Jose, CA
February 17, 2024; 7:00 p.m., NBCSBA		Wyoming	L 75–80	9–17 (2–11)	20 – Davis	7 – Diongue	6 – Amey Jr.	Provident Credit Union Event Center (1,891); San Jose, CA
February 20, 2024; 7:30 p.m., FS1		at Boise State	L 50–82	9–18 (2–12)	21 – Amey Jr.	7 – Wise	3 – Cardenas	ExtraMile Arena (9,049); Boise, ID
February 23, 2024; 7:00 p.m., FS1		Nevada	L 63–84	9–19 (2–13)	18 – Amey Jr.	6 – Davis	8 – Cardenas	Provident Credit Union Event Center (2,177); San Jose, CA
February 27, 2024; 8:00 p.m., CBSSN		at No. 20 San Diego State	L 64–72	9–20 (2–14)	17 – Amey Jr.	10 – Amey Jr.	4 – Amey Jr.	Viejas Arena (12,414); San Diego, CA
March 2, 2024; 8:00 p.m., CBSSN		at UNLV	L 50–68	9–21 (2–15)	17 – Cardenas	8 – Amey Jr.	4 – Tied	Thomas & Mack Center (6,404); Paradise, NV
March 6, 2024; 7:30 p.m., CBSSN		No. 22 Utah State	L 70–90	9–22 (2–1)	20 – Amey Jr.	7 – Amey Jr.	10 – Cardenas	Provident Credit Union Event Center (2,851); San Jose, CA
Mountain West tournament
March 13, 2024; 1:30 p.m., MW Network	(10)	vs. (7) Colorado State; First Round	L 62−72	9–23	18 – Cardenas	9 – Cardenas	6 – Cardenas	Thomas & Mack Center; Paradise, NV
*Non-conference game. ^{#}Rankings from AP Poll. (#) Tournament seedings in parentheses. All times are in Pacific Time.
