= 2023–24 Nevada Wolf Pack men's basketball team =

American college basketball season

2023–24 Nevada Wolf Pack men's basketball
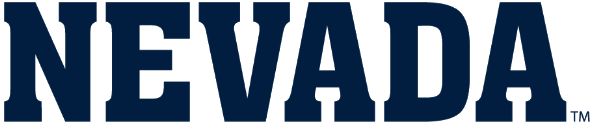

Diamond Head Classic champions

NCAA tournament, First Round
- Conference: Mountain West Conference
- Record: 26–8 (13–5 MW)
- Head coach: Steve Alford (5th season)
- Associate head coach: Craig Neal
- Assistant coaches: Kory Barnett; Bill Duany
- Home arena: Lawlor Events Center

2023–24 Mountain West Conference men's basketball standings
	Conf.				Overall
Team	W		L	PCT	W		L	PCT
No. 22 Utah State	14	–	4	.778	28	–	7	.800
Nevada	13	–	5	.722	26	–	8	.765
Boise State	13	–	5	.722	22	–	11	.667
UNLV	12	–	6	.667	21	–	13	.618
No. 17 San Diego State	11	–	7	.611	26	–	11	.703
New Mexico †	10	–	8	.556	26	–	10	.722
Colorado State	10	–	8	.556	25	–	11	.694
Wyoming	8	–	10	.444	15	–	17	.469
Fresno State	4	–	14	.222	12	–	21	.364
San Jose State	2	–	16	.111	9	–	23	.281
Air Force	2	–	16	.111	9	–	22	.290
† 2024 Mountain West tournament winner Rankings from AP Poll

The 2023–24 Nevada Wolf Pack men's basketball team represented the University of Nevada, Reno during the 2023–24 NCAA Division I men's basketball season. The Wolf Pack, led by fifth-year head coach Steve Alford, played their home games for the 40th season at the Lawlor Events Center in Reno, Nevada. They participated as members of the Mountain West Conference for the 12th season. They finished the season 26–6, 13–5 in Mountain West play to finish in second place. They were defeated by Colorado State in the quarterfinals of the Mountain West tournament. They received an at-large bid to the NCAA tournament as a No. 10 seed, where they lost in the first round to Dayton.

== Previous season ==
The Wolf Pack finished the 2022–23 season 22–9, 12–6 in Mountain West play to finish in fourth place. They were defeated by San Jose State in the quarterfinals of the Mountain West tournament. They received an at-large bid to the NCAA tournament as a No. 11 seed, where they lost in the first four play-in round to Arizona State.

== Offseason ==
=== Departures ===
Name	Number	Pos.	Height	Weight	Year	Hometown	Reason for departure
Trey Pettigrew	3	G	6'3"	175	Freshman	Chicago, IL	Transferred to Bradley
Darrion Williams	5	F	6'6"	210	Freshman	Las Vegas, NV	Transferred to Texas Tech
Michael Folarin	23	C	6'11"	210	Sophomore	London, England	Transferred to Eastern Washington
Will Baker	50	C	7'0"	245	RS Junior	Austin, TX	Transferred to LSU

=== Incoming transfers ===
Name	Number	Pos.	Height	Weight	Year	Hometown	Previous School
Jeriah Coleman	23	C	7'0"	220	Junior	Anchorage, AK	Clarendon College
Tylan Pope	33	F	6'6"	220	RS Junior	Franklinton, LA	Tulane

=== 2023 recruiting class ===
College recruiting information
Name	Hometown	School	Height	Weight	Commit date
Jazz Gardner #26 C	Hacienda Heights, CA	West Ranch High School	6 ft 9 in (2.06 m)	205 lb (93 kg)	Jun 20, 2023
Jazz Gardner #26 C	Recruit ratings: Rivals: 247Sports: ESPN: (82)				
Tyler Rolison #43 PG	Los Angeles, CA	St. Bernard High School	5 ft 9 in (1.75 m)	165 lb (75 kg)	May 3, 2023
Tyler Rolison #43 PG	Recruit ratings: Rivals: 247Sports: ESPN: (78)				
Amire Robinson; SG	Akron, OH	John R. Buchtel	6 ft 4 in (1.93 m)	N/A	Jul 17, 2021
Amire Robinson; SG	Recruit ratings: Rivals: 247Sports: ESPN: (NR)				
Overall recruit ranking: Scout: – Rivals: –
Note: In many cases, Scout, Rivals, 247Sports, On3, and ESPN may conflict in their listings of height and weight.; In these cases, the average was taken. ESPN grades are on a 100-point scale.; Sources: "2023 Team Ranking". Rivals.

=== 2024 recruiting class ===
College recruiting information (2024)
Name	Hometown	School	Height	Weight	Commit date
Caelum Harris; SF	Smyrna, TN	PHHoenix Prep	6 ft 6 in (1.98 m)	N/A	Oct 17, 2023
Caelum Harris; SF	Recruit ratings: Rivals: 247Sports: ESPN: (NR)				
Overall recruit ranking: Scout: – Rivals: –
Note: In many cases, Scout, Rivals, 247Sports, On3, and ESPN may conflict in their listings of height and weight.; In these cases, the average was taken. ESPN grades are on a 100-point scale.; Sources: "2024 Team Ranking". Rivals.

== Roster ==
2023–24 Nevada Wolf Pack men's basketball team
Players
Coaches

Pos.	#	Name	Height	Weight	Year	Previous school	Hometown
G	0	Hunter McIntosh	6 ft 2 in (1.88 m)	185 lb (84 kg)	GS	Elon	Snellville, GA
G/F	1	Tyler Powell	6 ft 5 in (1.96 m)	220 lb (100 kg)	Jr	Seton Hall	Los Angeles, CA
G	2	Jarod Lucas	6 ft 4 in (1.93 m)	195 lb (88 kg)	GS	Oregon State	Hacienda Heights, CA
G	3	Tyler Rolison	6 ft 0 in (1.83 m)	173 lb (78 kg)	Fr	St. Bernard HS	Los Angeles, CA
F	4	Tré Coleman	6 ft 7 in (2.01 m)	215 lb (98 kg)	Sr	Jeffersonville HS	Jeffersonville, IN
G	5	Amire Robinson	6 ft 4 in (1.93 m)	195 lb (88 kg)	Fr	John R. Buchtel Community Learning Center	Akron, OH
G	10	Snookey Wigington	5 ft 8 in (1.73 m)	140 lb (64 kg)	So	Ribet Academy	Los Angeles, CA
F	11	Nick Davidson	6 ft 8 in (2.03 m)	215 lb (98 kg)	RS So	Mater Dei HS	Santa Ana, CA
F	12	Jeriah Coleman	7 ft 1 in (2.16 m)	240 lb (109 kg)	Jr	Clarendon College	Anchorage, AK
G	13	Kenan Blackshear	6 ft 6 in (1.98 m)	215 lb (98 kg)	GS	Florida Atlantic	Orlando, FL
G	20	Daniel Foster	6 ft 6 in (1.98 m)	215 lb (98 kg)	Sr	Golden State Prep	Melbourne, Australia
C	23	Jazz Gardner	7 ft 0 in (2.13 m)	225 lb (102 kg)	Fr	West Ranch HS	Pasadena, CA
G/F	24	Isaac Hymes (W)	6 ft 8 in (2.03 m)	188 lb (85 kg)	Fr	PHHoenix Prep	Phoenix, AZ
F	33	Tylan Pope	6 ft 6 in (1.98 m)	240 lb (109 kg)	RS Jr	Tulane	Franklinton, LA
F	34	John Flannigan (W)	6 ft 8 in (2.03 m)	210 lb (95 kg)	So	De La Salle HS	Concord, CA
F	42	K. J. Hymes Jr.	6 ft 10 in (2.08 m)	235 lb (107 kg)	GS	Hillcrest Prep	Phoenix, AZ

Head coach

- Steve Alford (Indiana)

Assistant coach(es)

- Craig Neal (Georgia Tech)
- Kory Barnett (Indiana)
- Bill Duany (Indiana)

Legend

- (C) Team captain
- (S) Suspended
- (I) Ineligible
- (W) Walk-on
- Injured
- Current redshirt

Roster

== Schedule and results ==
Date time, TV	Rank^{#}	Opponent^{#}	Result	Record	High points	High rebounds	High assists	Site (attendance) city, state
Exhibition
November 1, 2023*; 7:00 p.m., −		Stanislaus State	W 84–80	−	21 – Lucas	5 – Rolison	4 – Blackshear	Lawlor Events Center (6,178); Reno, NV
Non-conference regular season
November 7, 2023*; 7:00 p.m., NSN/MWN		Sacramento State	W 77–63	1–0	18 – Lucas	8 – Gardner	4 – Lucas	Lawlor Events Center (6,875); Reno, NV
November 12, 2023*; 7:00 p.m., P12N		at Washington	W 83–76	2–0	31 – Blackshear	9 – Tied	5 – Blackshear	Alaska Airlines Arena (6,154); Seattle, WA
November 15, 2023*; 7:00 p.m., NSN/MWN		Pacific	W 88–41	3–0	12 – Tied	9 – Davidson	4 – Blackshear	Lawlor Events Center (7,131); Reno, NV
November 18, 2023*; 7:00 p.m., NSN/MWN		Portland	W 108–84	4–0	30 – Lucas	9 – Foster	11 – Blackshear	Lawlor Events Center (7,254); Reno, NV
November 29, 2023*; 7:00 p.m., NSN/MWN		Montana	W 77–66	5–0	22 – Blackshear	10 – Blackshear	5 – T. Coleman	Lawlor Events Center (6,918); Reno, NV
December 2, 2023*; 7:00 p.m., NSN/MWN		Loyola Marymount	W 73–53	6–0	20 – Lucas	7 – Foster	5 – Blackshear	Lawlor Events Center (7,851); Reno, NV
December 6, 2023*; 6:00 p.m., NSN/MWN		UC Davis	W 80–68	7–0	25 – Blackshear	8 – Davidson	3 – Blackshear	Lawlor Events Center (7,312); Reno, NV
December 9, 2023*; 4:30 p.m., BallerTV		vs. Drake; Jack Jones Classic	L 53–72	7–1	10 – Rolison	7 – Blackshear	3 – Blackshear	Dollar Loan Center (−); Henderson, NV
December 13, 2023*; 7:00 p.m., MWN		Weber State	W 72–55 ^{−}	8–1	15 – Blackshear	5 – Tied	5 – Tied	Lawlor Events Center (7,062); Reno, NV
December 17, 2023*; 8:00 p.m., ESPN+		at Hawai'i	W 72–66	9–1	16 – Lucas	7 – Davidson	4 – Tied	Stan Sheriff Center (4,794); Honolulu, HI
December 21, 2023*; 12:00 p.m., ESPNU		vs. Temple; Diamond Head Classic Quarterfinals	W 80–56	10–1	22 – Lucas	16 – Davidson	5 – Blackshear	Stan Sheriff Center (−); Honolulu, HI
December 22, 2023*; 2:00 p.m., ESPN2		vs. TCU; Diamond Head Classic Semifinals	W 88–75	11–1	25 – Lucas	7 – Foster	6 – Blackshear	Stan Sheriff Center (−); Honolulu, HI
December 24, 2023*; 6:00 p.m., ESPN		vs. Georgia Tech; Diamond Head Classic Championship Game	W 72–64	12–1	30 – Blackshear	8 – Davidson	4 – Blackshear	Stan Sheriff Center (5,005); Honolulu, HI
December 30, 2023*; 7:00 p.m., NSN/MWN		Fresno Pacific	W 92–59	13–1	22 – Lucas	5 – Blackshear	7 – Blackshear	Lawlor Events Center (8,913); Reno, NV
Mountain West regular season
January 6, 2024; 4:00 p.m., MWN		at Fresno State	W 72–57	14–1 (1–0)	18 – Blackshear	7 – Blackshear	4 – Blackshear	Save Mart Center (5,083); Fresno, CA
January 9, 2024; 7:00 p.m., MWN		Air Force	W 67–54	15–1 (2–0)	22 – Blackshear	10 – Davidson	4 – T. Coleman	Lawlor Events Center (7,645); Reno, NV
January 12, 2024; 7:30 p.m., FS1		Boise State	L 56–64	15–2 (2–1)	15 – Blackshear	6 – T. Coleman	4 – Lucas	Lawlor Events Center (10,191); Reno, NV
January 17, 2024; 8:00 p.m., CBSSN		at San Diego State	L 59–71	15–3 (2–2)	16 – T. Coleman	5 – Blackshear	7 – Blackshear	Viejas Arena (12,414); San Diego, CA
January 20, 2024; 4:30 p.m., MWN		at Wyoming	L 93–98	15–4 (2–3)	23 – T. Coleman	6 – Hymes	8 – Blackshear	Arena-Auditorium (4,136); Laramie, WY
January 24, 2024; 7:30 p.m., FS1		No. 24 Colorado State	W 77–64	16–4 (3–3)	28 – Lucas	7 – Davidson	7 – T. Coleman	Lawlor Events Center (9,029); Reno, NV
January 28, 2024; 7:00 p.m., FS1		at No. 25 New Mexico	L 55–89	16–5 (3–4)	9 – Tied	7 – Tied	2 – Tied	The Pit (15,021); Albuquerque, NM
February 2, 2024; 8:00 p.m., FS1		San Jose State	W 90–60	17–5 (4–4)	22 – Davidson	11 – Davidson	6 – Blackshear	Lawlor Events Center (8,512); Reno, NV
February 6, 2024; 6:00 p.m., MWN		at No. 22 Utah State	W 77–63	18–5 (5–4)	25 – Davidson	10 – Davidson	4 – Tied	Smith Spectrum (8,860); Logan, UT
February 9, 2024; 5:00 p.m., CBSSN		No. 24 San Diego State	W 70–66 ^{OT}	19–5 (6–4)	22 – Blackshear	6 – Foster	4 – Tied	Lawlor Events Center (11,394); Reno, NV
February 13, 2024; 8:00 p.m., CBSSN		New Mexico	L 82–83	19–6 (6–5)	19 – Davidson	8 – Foster	7 – Blackshear	Lawlor Events Center (8,293); Reno, NV
February 17, 2024; 8:30 p.m., FS1		at UNLV; Rivalry	W 69–66	20–6 (7–5)	19 – Davidson	11 – Davidson	3 – Tied	Thomas & Mack Center (9,517); Paradise, NV
February 20, 2024; 8:00 p.m., CBSSN		Wyoming	W 76–58	21–6 (8–5)	20 – Coleman	6 – Blackshear	8 – Blackshear	Lawlor Events Center (8,604); Reno, NV
February 23, 2024; 7:00 p.m., FS1		at San Jose State	W 84–63	22–6 (9–5)	23 – Davidson	15 – Davidson	9 – Blackshear	Provident Credit Union Event Center (2,177); San Jose, CA
February 27, 2024; 7:30 p.m., FS1		at Colorado State	W 77–74	23–6 (10–5)	23 – Lucas	12 – Davidson	3 – Lucas	Moby Arena (7,070); Fort Collins, CO
March 1, 2024; 7:30 p.m., CBSSN		Fresno State	W 74–66	24–6 (11–5)	21 – Lucas	7 – Foster	6 – Coleman	Lawlor Events Center (9,753); Reno, NV
March 5, 2024; 8:00 p.m., FS1		at Boise State	W 76–66	25–6 (12–5)	26 – McIntosh	3 – Tied	3 – Tied	ExtraMile Arena (11,242); Boise, ID
March 9, 2024; 7:30 p.m., CBSSN		UNLV; Rivalry	W 75–65	26–6 (13–5)	26 – Lucas	10 – Davidson	9 – Blackshear	Lawlor Events Center (11,874); Reno, NV
Mountain West tournament
March 14, 2024; 6:00 p.m., CBSSN	(2) No. 23	vs. (7) Colorado State; Quarterfinals	L 78–85	26–7	18 – Lucas	6 – Tied	6 – Blackshear	Thomas & Mack Center (−); Paradise, NV
NCAA tournament
March 21, 2024; 1:30 p.m, TBS	(10 W)	vs. (7 W) Dayton; First Round	L 60–63	26–8	17 – Lucas	7 – Davidson	8 – Blackshear	Delta Center; Salt Lake City, UT
*Non-conference game. ^{#}Rankings from AP Poll. (#) Tournament seedings in parentheses. All times are in Pacific Time.

== Rankings ==
Ranking movements Legend: ██ Increase in ranking ██ Decrease in ranking — = Not ranked RV = Received votes
	Week																				
Poll	1	2	3	4	5	6	7	8	9	10	11	12	13	14	15	16	17	18	19	20	Final
AP	—	—	RV	RV	RV	RV	RV	RV	RV	RV	RV	—	RV	—	RV	RV	RV	RV	23	RV	RV
Coaches	—	—	RV	RV	RV	—	RV	RV	RV	RV	RV	—	RV	—	RV	RV	RV	RV	22	RV	RV
