= 2023–24 Colorado State Rams men's basketball team =

American college basketball season

2023–24 Colorado State Rams men's basketball

Hall of Fame Classic champions

NCAA tournament, First Round
- Conference: Mountain West Conference
- Record: 25–11 (10–8 MW)
- Head coach: Niko Medved (6th season)
- Assistant coaches: Ali Farokhmanesh; Brian Cooley; C.J. Rivers; Tim Shelton
- Home arena: Moby Arena

2023–24 Mountain West Conference men's basketball standings
	Conf.				Overall
Team	W		L	PCT	W		L	PCT
No. 22 Utah State	14	–	4	.778	28	–	7	.800
Nevada	13	–	5	.722	26	–	8	.765
Boise State	13	–	5	.722	22	–	11	.667
UNLV	12	–	6	.667	21	–	13	.618
No. 17 San Diego State	11	–	7	.611	26	–	11	.703
New Mexico †	10	–	8	.556	26	–	10	.722
Colorado State	10	–	8	.556	25	–	11	.694
Wyoming	8	–	10	.444	15	–	17	.469
Fresno State	4	–	14	.222	12	–	21	.364
San Jose State	2	–	16	.111	9	–	23	.281
Air Force	2	–	16	.111	9	–	22	.290
† 2024 Mountain West tournament winner Rankings from AP Poll

The 2023–24 Colorado State Rams men's basketball team represented Colorado State University during the 2023–24 NCAA Division I men's basketball season. The Rams were led by 6th-year head coach Niko Medved and played their home games for the 58th season at Moby Arena in Fort Collins, Colorado. They participated as members of the Mountain West Conference for the 25th season.

== Previous season ==
The Rams finished the 2022–23 season 15–18, 6–12 in Mountain West play to finish in a tie for 8th place. They defeated Fresno State in the first round of the Mountain West Tournament before losing to San Diego State in the quarterfinals.

== Offseason ==
=== Departures ===
Name	Num	Pos.	Height	Weight	Year	Hometown	Reason for departure
Trace Young	0	G	6'3"	180	Junior	Austin, TX	Walk-on; transferred to LSU
John Tonje	1	G	6'5"	210	Senior	Omaha, NE	Graduate transferred to Missouri
Baylor Hebb	5	G	6'2"	180	Junior	Colleyville, TX	Transferred to UTEP
James Moors	10	F/C	6'10"	260	RS junior	Auckland, New Zealand	TBD
Nick Bassett	22	F	6'5"	205	Senior	Colorado Springs, CO	Walk-on; left the team for personal reasons
Isaiah Rivera	23	G	6'5"	210	Junior	Geneseo, IL	Transferred to UIC
Jacob Jennissen	35	C	7'1"	240	Junior	Sauk Centre, MN	Transferred to Minnesota State–Moorhead

=== Incoming transfers ===
Name	Num	Pos.	Height	Weight	Year	Hometown	Previous school
Joel Scott	1	F	6'7"	225	GS senior	Monument, CO	Black Hills State
Nique Clifford	10	G	6'6"	191	Senior	Colorado Springs, CO	Colorado
Javonte Johnson	13	G	6'6"	190	RS senior	Colorado Springs, CO	New Mexico

=== 2023 recruiting class ===
College recruiting
Name	Hometown	School	Height	Weight	Commit date
Kyle Evans; PG	Kansas City, MO	Staley High School	6 ft 2 in (1.88 m)	170 lb (77 kg)	Aug 16, 2022
Kyle Evans; PG	Recruit ratings: Rivals: 247Sports: ESPN: (NR)				
Rashaan Mbemba; F	Austria	Sportklub Niederösterreich St. Pölten	6 ft 7 in (2.01 m)	250 lb (110 kg)	Sep 26, 2022
Rashaan Mbemba; F	Recruit ratings: Rivals: 247Sports: ESPN: (NR)				
Overall recruit ranking: Scout: – Rivals: –
Note: In many cases, Scout, Rivals, 247Sports, On3, and ESPN may conflict in their listings of height and weight.; In these cases, the average was taken. ESPN grades are on a 100-point scale.; Sources: "Colorado State Commit List for 2023". Rivals.; "Men's Basketball Recruiting". Scout.; "ESPN – Colorado State Rams Basketball Recruiting 2023". ESPN.; "Scout.com Team Recruiting Rankings". Scout.; "2023 Team Ranking". Rivals.

=== 2024 recruiting class ===
College recruiting (2024)
Name	Hometown	School	Height	Weight	Commit date
Jaden Steppe #40 PF	Tualatin, OR	Tualatin High School	6 ft 6 in (1.98 m)	200 lb (91 kg)	Sep 25, 2023
Jaden Steppe #40 PF	Recruit ratings: Rivals: 247Sports: ESPN: (80)				
Jonathan Mekonnen; SF	Saint Paul, MN	Eastview Senior High School	6 ft 7 in (2.01 m)	185 lb (84 kg)	Jul 27, 2023
Jonathan Mekonnen; SF	Recruit ratings: Rivals: 247Sports: ESPN: (NR)				
Darnez Slater; PG	Corona, CA	Eleanor Roosevelt High School	6 ft 3 in (1.91 m)	165 lb (75 kg)	Jul 11, 2023
Darnez Slater; PG	Recruit ratings: Rivals: 247Sports: ESPN: (NR)				
Kyle Jorgensen; C	Minneapolis, MN	Washburn High School	6 ft 9 in (2.06 m)	N/A	Jun 26, 2023
Kyle Jorgensen; C	Recruit ratings: Rivals: 247Sports: ESPN: (NR)				
Overall recruit ranking: Scout: – Rivals: –
Note: In many cases, Scout, Rivals, 247Sports, On3, and ESPN may conflict in their listings of height and weight.; In these cases, the average was taken. ESPN grades are on a 100-point scale.; Sources: "Colorado State Commit List for 2024". Rivals.; "Men's Basketball Recruiting". Scout.; "ESPN – Colorado State Rams Basketball Recruiting 2024". ESPN.; "Scout.com Team Recruiting Rankings". Scout.; "2024 Team Ranking". Rivals.

== Roster ==
2023–24 Colorado State Rams men's basketball team
Players
Coaches

Pos.	#	Name	Height	Weight	Year	Previous school	Hometown
G	0	Kyan Evans	6 ft 2 in (1.88 m)	175 lb (79 kg)	Fr	Staley HS	Kansas City, MO
F	1	Joel Scott	6 ft 7 in (2.01 m)	225 lb (102 kg)	GS	Black Hills State	Monument, CO
G	2	Taviontae Jackson	6 ft 2 in (1.88 m)	165 lb (75 kg)	So	Las Vegas HS	Las Vegas, NV
G	3	Josiah Strong	6 ft 4 in (1.93 m)	195 lb (88 kg)	GS	Illinois State	Brooklyn Park, MN
G	4	Isaiah Stevens	6 ft 0 in (1.83 m)	185 lb (84 kg)	GS	Allen HS	Allen, TX
G	10	Nique Clifford	6 ft 6 in (1.98 m)	191 lb (87 kg)	Sr	Colorado	Colorado Springs, CO
F	11	Jack Payne	6 ft 6 in (1.98 m)	195 lb (88 kg)	RS Fr	Owyhee HS	Boise, ID
F	12	Patrick Cartier	6 ft 8 in (2.03 m)	220 lb (100 kg)	GS	Hillsdale College	Brookfield, WI
G	13	Javonte Johnson	6 ft 6 in (1.98 m)	215 lb (98 kg)	RS Sr	New Mexico	Colorado Springs, CO
G	14	Luke Murphy (W)	6 ft 2 in (1.88 m)	170 lb (77 kg)	RS Fr	Southern California Academy	Calabasas, CA
G	15	Jalen Lake	6 ft 4 in (1.93 m)	190 lb (86 kg)	Jr	Waxahachie HS	Waxachachie, TX
F	20	Joe Palmer	6 ft 4 in (1.93 m)	190 lb (86 kg)	GS	Augsburg	Faribault, MN
G	21	Rashaan Mbemba	6 ft 7 in (2.01 m)	250 lb (113 kg)	Fr	Borgi St. Polten	Vienna, Austria
G	22	Cam Lowe (W)	6 ft 5 in (1.96 m)	182 lb (83 kg)	Fr	Lewis Palmer HS	Monument, CO
F	32	Kyle Evans	6 ft 10 in (2.08 m)	200 lb (91 kg)	So	Santa Margarita Catholic HS	Aliso Viejo, CA

Head coach

- Niko Medved (Minnesota)

Assistant coach(es)

- Ali Farokhmanesh (Northern Iowa)
- Brian Cooley (Nebraska Wesleyan)
- C.J. Rivers (Drake)
- Tim Shelton (San Diego State)

Legend

- (C) Team captain
- (S) Suspended
- (I) Ineligible
- (W) Walk-on
- Injured
- Current redshirt

Roster

== Schedule and results ==
Date time, TV	Rank^{#}	Opponent^{#}	Result	Record	High points	High rebounds	High assists	Site (attendance) city, state
Non-conference regular season
November 6, 2023*; 8:00 p.m., MW Network		Louisiana Tech	W 81–73	1–0	18 – Scott	5 – Palmer	10 – Stevens	Moby Arena (4,331); Fort Collins, CO
November 10, 2023*; 7:00 p.m., MW Network		Wright State	W 105–77	2–0	18 – Stevens	9 – Tied	14 – Stevens	Moby Arena (4,802); Fort Collins, CO
November 14, 2023*; 6:00 p.m., ESPN+		at Northern Colorado	W 83–64	3–0	24 – Stevens	14 – Clifford	4 – Stevens	Bank of Colorado Arena (2,181); Greeley, CO
November 17, 2023*; 7:00 p.m., MW Network		Kansas City	W 84–61	4–0	14 – Cartier	6 – Scott	4 – Tied	Moby Arena (3,830); Fort Collins, CO
November 22, 2023*; 11:30 a.m., CBSSN		vs. Boston College; Hall of Fame Classic Semifinals	W 86–74	5–0	18 – Stevens	7 – Scott	8 – Stevens	T-Mobile Center (–); Kansas City, MO
November 23, 2023*; 2:00 p.m., CBSSN		vs. No. 8 Creighton; Hall of Fame Classic Championship	W 69–48	6–0	20 – Stevens	9 – Scott	8 – Stevens	T-Mobile Center (–); Kansas City, MO
November 29, 2023*; 7:00 p.m., CBSSN	No. 20	Colorado	W 88–83	7–0	20 – Stevens	6 – Clifford	11 – Stevens	Moby Arena (8,083); Fort Collins, CO
December 2, 2023*; 5:00 p.m., CBSSN	No. 20	vs. Washington; Legends of Basketball Invitational	W 86–81	8–0	17 – Scott	8 – Scott	5 – Tied	MGM Grand Garden Arena (N/A); Paradise, NV
December 6, 2023*; 7:00 p.m., MW Network	No. 13	Denver	W 90–80	9–0	19 – Cartier	7 – Scott	9 – Stevens	Moby Arena (7,135); Fort Collins, CO
December 9, 2023*; 4:30 p.m., CBSSN	No. 13	Saint Mary's	L 61–64	9–1	20 – Stevens	11 – Clifford	3 – Tied	Moby Arena (8,083); Fort Collins, CO
December 17, 2023*; 4:00 p.m., MW Network	No. 17	CSU Pueblo	W 86–54	10–1	18 – Stevens	9 – Clifford	6 – Stevens	Moby Arena (5,739); Fort Collins, CO
December 22, 2023*; 8:00 p.m., ESPN+	No. 16	at Loyola Marymount	W 76–67	11–1	23 – Clifford	4 – Tied	7 – Stevens	Gersten Pavilion (1,365); Los Angeles, CA
December 29, 2023*; 7:00 p.m., MW Network	No. 15	Adams State	W 106–61	12–1	13 – Tied	6 – Mbemba	7 – Stevens	Moby Arena (6,852); Fort Collins, CO
Mountain West regular season
January 2, 2024; 8:30 p.m., FS1	No. 13	New Mexico	W 76–68	13–1 (1–0)	21 – Cartier	10 – Clifford	8 – Stevens	Moby Arena (5,165); Fort Collins, CO
January 6, 2024; 7:00 p.m., MW Network	No. 13	at Utah State	L 72–77	13–2 (1–1)	21 – Stevens	5 – Palmer	8 – Stevens	Smith Spectrum (10,270); Logan, UT
January 9, 2024; 7:00 p.m., MW Network	No. 17	at Boise State	L 58–65	13–3 (1–2)	15 – Stevens	8 – Clifford	3 – Stevens	ExtraMile Arena (12,058); Boise, ID
January 16, 2024; 8:30 p.m., MW Network		Air Force	W 78–69 ^{OT}	14–3 (2–2)	17 – Clifford	7 – Scott	9 – Stevens	Moby Arena (6,345); Fort Collins, CO
January 19, 2024; 8:30 p.m., FS1		UNLV	W 78–75	15–3 (3–2)	21 – Clifford	7 – Clifford	7 – Stevens	Moby Arena (8,083); Fort Collins, CO
January 24, 2024; 8:30 p.m., FS1	No. 24	at Nevada	L 64–77	15–4 (3–3)	13 – Lake	9 – Clifford	10 – Stevens	Lawlor Events Center (9,029); Reno, NV
January 27, 2024; 2:00 p.m., MW Network	No. 24	Wyoming; Border War	L 76–79 ^{OT}	15–5 (3–4)	19 – Cartier	12 – Clifford	9 – Stevens	Arena-Auditorium (7,113); Laramie, WY
January 30, 2024; 7:00 p.m., CBSSN		San Diego State	W 79–71	16–5 (4–4)	20 – Tied	10 – Clifford	6 – Stevens	Moby Arena (8,093); Fort Collins, CO
February 3, 2024; 8:00 p.m., CBSSN		at Fresno State	W 73–61	17–5 (5–4)	14 – Tied	8 – Clifford	6 – Scott	Save Mart Center (4,331); Fresno, CA
February 6, 2024; 7:00 p.m., MW Network		Boise State	W 75–62	18–5 (6–4)	16 – Stevens	6 – Tied	11 – Stevens	Moby Arena (7,221); Fort Collins, CO
February 9, 2024; 7:30 p.m., FS1		San Jose State	W 66–47	19–5 (7–4)	13 – Mbemba	11 – Clifford	11 – Stevens	Moby Arena (7,783); Fort Collins, CO
February 13, 2024; 7:00 p.m., CBSSN		at San Diego State	L 55–71	19–6 (7–5)	14 – Strong	6 – Scott	5 – Stevens	Viejas Arena (12,414); San Diego, CA
February 17, 2024; 5:30 p.m., CBSSN		Utah State	W 75–55	20–6 (8–5)	18 – Stevens	10 – Clifford	8 – Stevens	Moby Arena (8,083); Fort Collins, CO
February 21, 2024; 8:00 p.m., CBSSN	No. 22	at New Mexico	L 66–68	20–7 (8–6)	20 – Stevens	13 – Scott	9 – Stevens	The Pit (14,618); Albuquerque, NM
February 24, 2024; 6:00 p.m., CBSSN	No. 22	at UNLV	L 60–66	20–8 (8–7)	18 – Stevens	7 – Tied	6 – Stevens	Thomas & Mack Center (8,591); Paradise, NV
February 27, 2024; 8:30 p.m., FS1		Nevada	L 74–77	20–9 (8–8)	23 – Stevens	8 – Cartier	6 – Stevens	Moby Arena (7,070); Fort Collins, CO
March 2, 2024; 2:00 p.m., MW Network		Wyoming; Border War	W 70–62	21–9 (9–8)	15 – Manyawu	10 – Manyawu	3 – Tied	Moby Arena (8,083); Fort Collins, CO
March 9, 2024; 2:00 p.m., MW Network		at Air Force	W 82–73	22–9 (10–8)	29 – Stevens	9 – Clifford	4 – Clifford	Clune Arena (4,647); Colorado Springs, CO
Mountain West tournament
March 13, 2024; 2:30 p.m., MW Network	(7)	vs. (10) San Jose State; First Round	W 72−62	23–9	17 – Scott	9 – Clifford	10 – Stevens	Thomas & Mack Center; Paradise, NV
March 14, 2024; 7:00 p.m., CBSSN	(7)	vs. (2) No. 23 Nevada; Quarterfinals	W 85–78	24–9	16 – Lake	10 – Clifford	7 – Stevens	Thomas & Mack Center; Paradise, NV
March 15, 2024; 10:00 p.m., CBSSN	(7)	vs. (6) New Mexico; Semifinals	L 61–74	24–10	20 – Scott	9 – Clifford	7 – Clifford	Thomas & Mack Center (13,213); Paradise, NV
NCAA tournament
March 19, 2024; 7:10 p.m., TruTV	(10 MW)	vs. (10 MW) Virginia; First Four	W 67–42	25–10	23 – Scott	11 – Scott	6 – Clifford	UD Arena (12,247); Dayton, OH
March 21, 2024; 4:50 p.m., TNT	(10 MW)	vs. (7 MW) Texas; First Round	L 44–56	25–11	10 – Tied	10 – Clifford	4 – Stevens	Spectrum Center; Charlotte, NC
*Non-conference game. ^{#}Rankings from AP Poll. (#) Tournament seedings in parentheses. MW=Midwest region. All times are in Mountain Time.

== Rankings ==
Ranking movements Legend: ██ Increase in ranking ██ Decrease in ranking — = Not ranked RV = Received votes
	Week																				
Poll	1	2	3	4	5	6	7	8	9	10	11	12	13	14	15	16	17	18	19	20	Final
AP	—	—	RV	20	13	17	16	15	13	17	RV	24	RV	RV	RV	22	RV	RV	RV	RV	RV
Coaches	—	—	—	21	12	18	17	14	14	18	RV	23	RV	RV	25	24	—	—	—	—	RV

== See also ==
- 2023–24 Colorado State Rams women's basketball team
