= 2024 Mountain West Conference men's basketball tournament =

American college basketball competition

- Classification: Division I
- Season: 2023–24
- Teams: 11
- Site: Thomas & Mack Center; Paradise, Nevada
- Champions: New Mexico (5th title)
- Winning coach: Richard Pitino (1st title)
- MVP: Jaelen House (New Mexico)
- Attendance: 47,712 (total); 11,112 (championship)
- Television: Mountain West Network, CBSSN, CBS/Paramount+

2023–24 Mountain West Conference men's basketball standings
	Conf.				Overall
Team	W		L	PCT	W		L	PCT
No. 22 Utah State	14	–	4	.778	28	–	7	.800
Nevada	13	–	5	.722	26	–	8	.765
Boise State	13	–	5	.722	22	–	11	.667
UNLV	12	–	6	.667	21	–	13	.618
No. 17 San Diego State	11	–	7	.611	26	–	11	.703
New Mexico †	10	–	8	.556	26	–	10	.722
Colorado State	10	–	8	.556	25	–	11	.694
Wyoming	8	–	10	.444	15	–	17	.469
Fresno State	4	–	14	.222	12	–	21	.364
San Jose State	2	–	16	.111	9	–	23	.281
Air Force	2	–	16	.111	9	–	22	.290
† 2024 Mountain West tournament winner Rankings from AP Poll

The 2024 Mountain West Conference men's basketball tournament is the postseason men's basketball tournament for the Mountain West Conference. It was held March 13–16, 2024, at the Thomas & Mack Center on the campus of University of Nevada, Las Vegas, in Paradise, Nevada. The tournament champion will receive the conference's automatic bid to the NCAA tournament.

== Seeds ==
The defending champions from the prior season were the San Diego State Aztecs.

All 11 Mountain West schools will participate in the tournament. Teams are to be seeded by conference record with a tiebreaker system to seed teams with identical percentages. The top five teams will receive byes into the tournament quarterfinals. The remaining teams will play in the first round. Tie-breaking procedures remained unchanged since the 2020 tournament.

- Head-to-head record between the tied teams
- Record against the highest-seeded team not involved in the tie, going down through the seedings as necessary
- Higher NET

Seed	School	Conf	Tiebreaker(s)
1	Utah State	14–4	
2	Nevada	13–5	1–0 vs. Utah State
3	Boise State	13–5	0–2 vs. Utah State
4	UNLV	12–6	
5	San Diego State	11–7	
6	New Mexico	10–8	2–0 vs. Nevada
7	Colorado State	10–8	0–2 vs. Nevada
8	Wyoming	8–10	
9	Fresno State	4–14	
10	San Jose State	2–16	2–0 vs. Air Force
11	Air Force	2–16	0–2 vs. San Jose State

== Schedule ==
Game	Time	Matchup	Score	Television	Attendance
First round – Wednesday, March 13
1	11:00 am	No. 8 Wyoming vs. No. 9 Fresno State	73–77	Mountain West Network	5,858
2	1:30 pm	No. 7 Colorado State vs. No. 10 San Jose State	72–62	Mountain West Network	5,858
3	4:00 pm	No. 6 New Mexico vs. No. 11 Air Force	82–56	Mountain West Network	5,858
Quarterfinals – Thursday, March 14
4	12:00 pm	No. 1 Utah State vs. No. 9 Fresno State	87–75^{OT}	CBSSN	8,968
5	2:30 pm	No. 4 UNLV vs. No. 5 San Diego State	71–74^{OT}	CBSSN	8,968
6	6:00 pm	No. 2 Nevada vs. No. 7 Colorado State	78–85	CBSSN	8,561
7	8:30 pm	No. 3 Boise State vs. No. 6 New Mexico	66–76	CBSSN	8,561
Semifinals – Friday, March 15
8	6:30 pm	No. 1 Utah State vs. No. 5 San Diego State	70–86	CBSSN	13,213
9	9:00 pm	No. 7 Colorado State vs. No. 6 New Mexico	61–74	CBSSN	13,213
Championship – Saturday, March 16
10	3:00 pm	No. 5 San Diego State vs. No. 6 New Mexico	68–61	CBS/Paramount+	11,112
Game times in PT. Rankings denote tournament seeding.

== Bracket ==
First round Wednesday, March 13; Mountain West Network
8	Wyoming	73
9	Fresno State	77
7	Colorado State	72
10	San Jose State	62
6	New Mexico	82
11	Air Force	56

Quarterfinals; Thursday, March 14; CBSSN
1	Utah State	87*
9	Fresno State	75
4	UNLV	71
5	San Diego State	74*
2	Nevada	78
7	Colorado State	85
3	Boise State	66
6	New Mexico	76

Semifinals; Friday, March 15; CBSSN
1	Utah State	70
5	San Diego State	86
7	Colorado State	61
6	New Mexico	74

Championship; Saturday, March 16; CBS/Paramount+
5	San Diego State	61
6	New Mexico	68

* denotes overtime period
