= 2023–24 UNLV Runnin' Rebels basketball team =

American college basketball season

2023–24 UNLV Runnin' Rebels basketball

NIT, Quarterfinals
- Conference: Mountain West Conference
- Record: 21–13 (12–6 MW)
- Head coach: Kevin Kruger (3rd season)
- Assistant coaches: Barret Peery; John Cooper; Jamaal Williams
- Home arena: Thomas & Mack Center

2023–24 Mountain West Conference men's basketball standings
	Conf.				Overall
Team	W		L	PCT	W		L	PCT
No. 22 Utah State	14	–	4	.778	28	–	7	.800
Nevada	13	–	5	.722	26	–	8	.765
Boise State	13	–	5	.722	22	–	11	.667
UNLV	12	–	6	.667	21	–	13	.618
No. 17 San Diego State	11	–	7	.611	26	–	11	.703
New Mexico †	10	–	8	.556	26	–	10	.722
Colorado State	10	–	8	.556	25	–	11	.694
Wyoming	8	–	10	.444	15	–	17	.469
Fresno State	4	–	14	.222	12	–	21	.364
San Jose State	2	–	16	.111	9	–	23	.281
Air Force	2	–	16	.111	9	–	22	.290
† 2024 Mountain West tournament winner Rankings from AP Poll

The 2023–24 UNLV Runnin' Rebels basketball team represented the University of Nevada, Las Vegas during the 2023–24 NCAA Division I men's basketball season. The Runnin' Rebels, led by third-year head coach Kevin Kruger, played their home games for the 41st season at the Thomas & Mack Center in Paradise, Nevada. They participated as members of the Mountain West Conference for the 25th season.

== Previous season ==
The Runnin' Rebels finished the 2022–23 season 19–13, 7–11 in Mountain West play to finish in seventh place. In the MWC tournament, they defeated Air Force in the first round before losing to Boise State in the quarterfinals. They failed to receive an invite to a postseason tournament.

== Offseason ==
=== Departures ===
Name	Number	Pos.	Height	Weight	Year	Hometown	Reason for departure
Victor Iwuakor	0	F	6'7"	225	Senior	Abuja, Nigeria	Graduate transferred to Southern Miss
Elijah Parquet	1	G	6'4"	195	GS Senior	Beaumont, TX	Graduated
Jordan McCabe	5	G	6'0"	190	GS Senior	Kaukauna, WI	Graduated
Keshon Gilbert	10	G	6'4"	190	Sophomore	Las Vegas, NV	Transferred to Iowa State
David Muoka	12	C	6'10"	235	Senior	Hong Kong	Graduate transferred
Keyshawn Hall	14	G	6'7"	250	Freshman	Cleveland, OH	Transferred to George Mason
Cameron Burist	34	G	6'3"	185	Senior	Las Vegas, NV	Graduated
Elijah Harkless	55	G	6'3"	195	GS Senior	San Bernardino, CA	Graduated

=== Incoming transfers ===
Name	Number	Pos.	Height	Weight	Year	Hometown	Previous college
Jalen Hill	1	F	6'6"	232	GS Senior	Las Vegas, NV	Oklahoma
Robert Whaley	5	F	6'6"		Junior	Farmington, NV	College of Southern Idaho
Kalib Boone	10	F	6'9"	198	GS Senior	Tulsa, OK	Oklahoma State
Keylan Boone	20	G/F	6'8"	200	GS Senior	Tulsa, OK	Pacific

=== 2023 recruiting class ===
College recruiting information
Name	Hometown	School	Height	Weight	Commit date
Dedan Thomas #9 PG	Henderson, NV	Liberty High School	6 ft 1 in (1.85 m)	170 lb (77 kg)	May 14, 2023
Dedan Thomas #9 PG	Recruit ratings: Rivals: 247Sports: ESPN: (88)				
Brooklyn Hicks #33 SG	Lacey, WA	Timberline High School	6 ft 3 in (1.91 m)	175 lb (79 kg)	Oct 20, 2022
Brooklyn Hicks #33 SG	Recruit ratings: Rivals: 247Sports: ESPN: (80)				
Jacob Bannarbie; C	Encinitas, CA	Hillcrest Prep	6 ft 8 in (2.03 m)	215 lb (98 kg)	Jul 1, 2023
Jacob Bannarbie; C	Recruit ratings: Rivals: 247Sports: ESPN: (NR)				
Overall recruit ranking:
Note: In many cases, Scout, Rivals, 247Sports, On3, and ESPN may conflict in their listings of height and weight.; In these cases, the average was taken. ESPN grades are on a 100-point scale.; Sources: "2023 UNLV Basketball Commitments". Rivals.; "2023 Team Ranking". Rivals.

=== 2024 recruiting class ===
College recruiting information (2024)
Name	Hometown	School	Height	Weight	Commit date
James Evans #17 SF	Santa Clarita, CA	West Ranch High School	6 ft 1 in (1.85 m)	170 lb (77 kg)	Jun 30, 2023
James Evans #17 SF	Recruit ratings: Rivals: 247Sports: ESPN: (81)				
Overall recruit ranking:
Note: In many cases, Scout, Rivals, 247Sports, On3, and ESPN may conflict in their listings of height and weight.; In these cases, the average was taken. ESPN grades are on a 100-point scale.; Sources: "2024 UNLV Basketball Commitments". Rivals.; "2024 Team Ranking". Rivals.

== Roster ==
2023–24 UNLV Runnin' Rebels men's basketball team
Players
Coaches

Pos.	#	Name	Height	Weight	Year	Previous school	Hometown
F	0	Isaiah Cottrell	6 ft 11 in (2.11 m)	245 lb (111 kg)	RS So	West Virginia	Las Vegas, NV
F	1	Jalen Hill	6 ft 6 in (1.98 m)	230 lb (104 kg)	GS	Oklahoma	Las Vegas, NV
G	2	Justin Webster	6 ft 3 in (1.91 m)	190 lb (86 kg)	GS	Hawaii	Dallas, TX
G	3	Shane Nowell	6 ft 6 in (1.98 m)	220 lb (100 kg)	Jr	Arizona	Seattle, WA
F	5	Rob Whaley Jr.	6 ft 7 in (2.01 m)	260 lb (118 kg)	Jr	College of Southern Idaho	Farmington, UT
F	10	Kalib Boone	6 ft 9 in (2.06 m)	215 lb (98 kg)	GS	Oklahoma State	Tulsa, OK
G	11	Dedan Thomas Jr.	6 ft 1 in (1.85 m)	170 lb (77 kg)	Fr	Liberty HS	Las Vegas, NV
F	12	Jacob Bannarbie	6 ft 9 in (2.06 m)	230 lb (104 kg)	Fr	Hillcrest Prep (AZ)	Anchorage, AK
G	13	Brooklyn Hicks	6 ft 3 in (1.91 m)	185 lb (84 kg)	Fr	Timberline HS	Seattle, WA
G	15	Luis Rodriguez	6 ft 6 in (1.98 m)	220 lb (100 kg)	GS	Ole Miss	Los Angeles, CA
F	20	Keylan Boone	6 ft 8 in (2.03 m)	200 lb (91 kg)	GS	Pacific	Tulsa, OK
F	22	Karl Jones	6 ft 10 in (2.08 m)	260 lb (118 kg)	Sr	LA Southwest College	Chicago, IL
G	24	Jackie Johnson III	5 ft 11 in (1.8 m)	185 lb (84 kg)	Jr	Duquesne	Wichita, KS
G	31	Nick Walters (W)	6 ft 1 in (1.85 m)	185 lb (84 kg)	Sr	College of Southern Idaho	Henderson, NV

Head coach

- Kevin Kruger (UNLV)

Assistant coach(es)

- Barret Peery (Southern Utah)
- John Cooper (Wichita State)
- Jamaal Williams (Washington)

Legend

- (C) Team captain
- (S) Suspended
- (I) Ineligible
- (W) Walk-on
- Injured
- Current redshirt

Roster

== Schedule and results ==
Date time, TV	Rank^{#}	Opponent^{#}	Result	Record	High points	High rebounds	High assists	Site (attendance) city, state
Non-conference regular season
November 8, 2023*; 7:00 p.m., –		Southern	L 71–85	0–1	18 – Cottrell	7 – Cottrell	5 – Thomas Jr.	Thomas & Mack Center (5,573); Paradise, NV
November 11, 2023*; 4:00 p.m., –		Stetson; Sunshine Slam campus site game	W 71–55	1–1	15 – Rodriguez	13 – Hill	9 – Thomas Jr.	Thomas & Mack Center (5,003); Paradise, NV
November 17, 2023*; 7:00 p.m., ESPN+		at Pepperdine	W 82–68	2–1	19 – Ka. Boone	7 – Hill	5 – Thomas Jr.	Firestone Fieldhouse (–); Malibu, CA
November 20, 2023*; 2:30 p.m., CBSSN		vs. Florida State; Sunshine Slam Beach Division semifinals	L 75–83	2–2	15 – Ka. Boone	6 – Thomas Jr.	6 – Thomas Jr.	Ocean Center (–); Daytona Beach, FL
November 21, 2023*; 3:30 p.m., FloSports		vs. Richmond; Sunshine Slam Beach Division consolation	L 65–82	2–3	17 – Johnson III	7 – Hill	4 – Thomas Jr.	Ocean Center (–); Daytona Beach, FL
November 28, 2023*; 7:00 p.m., MW Network		Akron	W 72–70	3–3	13 – Rodriguez	7 – Ka. Boone	6 – Thomas Jr.	Thomas & Mack Center (4,702); Paradise, NV
December 6, 2023*; 6:00 p.m., CBSSN		at Dayton	Canceled due to the 2023 University of Nevada, Las Vegas shooting.					UD Arena; Dayton, OH
December 9, 2023*; 7:00 p.m., Baller TV		vs. Loyola Marymount; Jack Jones Classic	L 75–78	3–4	17 – Thomas Jr.	8 – Rodriguez	8 – Thomas Jr.	Dollar Loan Center (–); Henderson, NV
December 13, 2023*; 6:00 p.m., CBSSN		vs. No. 8 Creighton; Jack Jones Classic	W 79–64	4–4	25 – Ka. Boone	7 – Ka. Boone	9 – Thomas Jr.	Dollar Loan Center (2,725); Henderson, NV
December 16, 2023*; 4:00 p.m., ESPN+		vs. Saint Mary's; Jerry Colangelo Classic	L 67–69 ^{2OT}	4–5	24 – Thomas Jr.	7 – Tied	2 – Tied	Footprint Center (–); Phoenix, AZ
December 21, 2023*; 7:00 p.m., MW Network		Hofstra	W 74–56	5–5	16 – Ke. Boone	10 – Rodriguez	7 – Thomas Jr.	Thomas & Mack Center (5,065); Paradise, NV
December 31, 2023*; 12:00 p.m., MW Network		Carroll College	W 87–51	6–5	16 – Webster	6 – Tied	10 – Thomas Jr.	Thomas & Mack Center (4,374); Paradise, NV
January 2, 2024*; 1:00 p.m., MW Network		Bethesda University	W 112–56	7–5	19 – Rodriguez	17 – Ke. Boone	7 – Tied	Cox Pavilion (1,005); Paradise, NV
Mountain West regular season
January 6, 2024; 1:00 p.m., CBS		at San Diego State; Rivalry	L 61–72	7–6 (0–1)	13 – Tied	6 – Ke. Boone	5 – Thomas Jr.	Viejas Arena (12,414); San Diego, CA
January 9, 2024; 7:30 p.m., FS1		New Mexico	W 83–73	8–6 (1–1)	29 – Ka. Boone	8 – Rodriguez	7 – Thomas Jr.	Thomas & Mack Center (5,760); Paradise, NV
January 13, 2024; 12:00 p.m., CBSSN		No. 20 Utah State	L 86–87	8–7 (1–2)	23 – Rodriguez	9 – Rodriguez	11 – Thomas Jr.	Thomas & Mack Center (5,992); Paradise, NV
January 16, 2024; 7:00 p.m., CBSSN		at Boise State	W 68–64	9–7 (2–2)	18 – Whaley Jr.	12 – Rodriguez	3 – Webster	ExtraMile Arena (9,863); Boise, ID
January 19, 2024; 7:30 p.m., FS1		at Colorado State	L 75–78	9–8 (2–3)	21 – Ke. Boone	8 – Ke. Boone	8 – Thomas Jr.	Moby Arena (8,083); Fort Collins, CO
January 23, 2024; 8:00 p.m., CBSSN		Air Force	L 58–90	9–9 (2–4)	14 – Webster	8 – Rodriguez	2 – tied	Thomas & Mack Center (6,392); Paradise, NV
January 27, 2024; 6:00 p.m., FS1		at San José State	W 77–65	10–9 (3–4)	18 – Ke. Boone	8 – Rodriguez	6 – Thomas Jr.	Provident Credit Union Event Center (2,982); San Jose, CA
January 30, 2024; 8:00 p.m., FS1		Fresno State	W 78–69	11–9 (4–4)	21 – Ka. Boone	13 – Ke. Boone	6 – Thomas Jr.	Thomas & Mack Center (5,980); Paradise, NV
February 3, 2024; 5:00 p.m., CBSSN		Wyoming	W 62–48	12–9 (5–4)	14 – Tied	7 – Ke. Boone	5 – Thomas Jr.	Thomas & Mack Center (5,963); Paradise, NV
February 10, 2024; 5:00 p.m., CBSSN		at No. 25 New Mexico	W 80–77	13–9 (6–4)	25 – Thomas Jr.	7 – Tied	4 – Thomas Jr.	The Pit (15,435); Albuquerque, NM
February 14, 2024; 8:00 p.m., CBSSN		at Fresno State	W 67–65	14–9 (7–4)	17 – Whaley Jr.	7 – Ke. Boone	3 – Ke. Boone	Save Mart Center (2,915); Fresno, CA
February 17, 2024; 8:30 p.m., FS1		Nevada; Rivalry	L 66–69	14–10 (7–5)	19 – Thomas Jr.	4 – Tied	8 – Thomas Jr.	Thomas & Mack Center (9,517); Paradise, NV
February 21, 2024; 8:00 p.m., FS1		at Air Force	W 72–43	15–10 (8–5)	15 – Whaley Jr.	8 – Ka. Boone	2 – Tied	Clune Arena (1,089); Colorado Springs, CO
February 24, 2024; 5:00 p.m., CBSSN		No. 22 Colorado State	W 66–60	16–10 (9–5)	23 – Thomas Jr.	6 – Tied	2 – Tied	Thomas & Mack Center (8,591); Paradise, NV
February 27, 2024; 6:00 p.m., CBSSN		at Wyoming	W 75–69 ^{OT}	17–10 (10–5)	24 – Ka. Boone	12 – Ka. Boone	2 – Tied	Arena-Auditorium (3,283); Laramie, WY
March 2, 2024; 7:00 p.m., CBSSN		San José State	W 68–50	18–10 (11–5)	18 – Thomas Jr.	12 – Tied	3 – Tied	Thomas & Mack Center (6,404); Paradise, NV
March 5, 2024; 8:00 p.m., CBSSN		No. 21 San Diego State; Rivalry	W 62–58	19–10 (12–5)	19 – Thomas Jr.	11 – Ke. Boone	4 – Ke. Boone	Thomas & Mack Center (7,911); Paradise, NV
March 9, 2024; 7:30 p.m., CBSSN		at Nevada; Rivalry	L 65–75	19–11 (12–6)	24 – Ke. Boone	8 – Whaley Jr.	3 – Thomas Jr.	Lawlor Events Center (11,874); Reno, NV
Mountain West tournament
March 14, 2024; 2:30 p.m., CBSSN	(4)	vs. (5) San Diego State; Quarterfinals	L 71–74 ^{OT}	19–12	29 – Thomas Jr.	8 – Boone	5 – Thomas Jr.	Thomas & Mack Center (8,968); Paradise, NV
NIT
March 20, 2024; 5:00 p.m., ESPN+		at (2) Princeton; First Round - Seton Hall Bracket	W 84–77	20–12	21 – Whaley Jr.	11 – Ke. Boone	4 – Tied	Jadwin Gymnasium (1,708); Princeton, NJ
March 24, 2024; 6:30 p.m., ESPNU		Boston College; Second Round - Seton Hall Bracket	W 79–70	21–12	19 – Ke. Boone	8 – Ke. Boone	5 – Tied	Thomas & Mack Center (5,543); Paradise, NV
March 27, 2024; 4:00 p.m., ESPN2		at (1) Seton Hall; Quarterfinals - Seton Hall Bracket	L 68–91	21–13	16 – Ke. Boone	7 – Whaley Jr.	4 – Tied	Walsh Gymnasium (1,316); South Orange, NJ
*Non-conference game. ^{#}Rankings from AP Poll. (#) Tournament seedings in parentheses. All times are in Pacific Time.
