= 2023–24 Wyoming Cowboys basketball team =

American college basketball season

2023–24 Wyoming Cowboys basketball
- Conference: Mountain West Conference
- Record: 15–17 (8–10 MW)
- Head coach: Jeff Linder (4th season)
- Assistant coaches: Ken DeWeese; Nick Whitmore; Bryston Williams; Shaun Vandiver
- Home arena: Arena-Auditorium

2023–24 Mountain West Conference men's basketball standings
	Conf.				Overall
Team	W		L	PCT	W		L	PCT
No. 22 Utah State	14	–	4	.778	28	–	7	.800
Nevada	13	–	5	.722	26	–	8	.765
Boise State	13	–	5	.722	22	–	11	.667
UNLV	12	–	6	.667	21	–	13	.618
No. 17 San Diego State	11	–	7	.611	26	–	11	.703
New Mexico †	10	–	8	.556	26	–	10	.722
Colorado State	10	–	8	.556	25	–	11	.694
Wyoming	8	–	10	.444	15	–	17	.469
Fresno State	4	–	14	.222	12	–	21	.364
San Jose State	2	–	16	.111	9	–	23	.281
Air Force	2	–	16	.111	9	–	22	.290
† 2024 Mountain West tournament winner Rankings from AP Poll

The 2023–24 Wyoming Cowboys basketball team represented the University of Wyoming during the 2023–24 NCAA Division I men's basketball season. The Cowboys were led by Jeff Linder in his fourth and final season and played their home games for the 42nd season at Arena-Auditorium in Laramie, Wyoming. They participated as members of the Mountain West Conference for the 25th season.

== Previous season ==
The Cowboys finished the 2022–23 season 9–22, 4–14 in Mountain West play, to finish in last place. They lost to New Mexico in the first round of the Mountain West tournament.

== Offseason ==
Three players left the team during the season, and had six more players transfer after the season. The Cowboys also hired two new assistant coaches, Bryston Williams and Nick Whitmore, to replace Marc Rodgers and Sundance Wicks.

=== Departures ===
Name	Number	Pos.	Height	Weight	Year	Hometown	Reason for departure
Ethan Anderson	20	G	6' 1"	208	Jr.	Los Angeles, CA	Transferred to Pepperdine
Max Agbonkpolo	23	G/F	6' 9"	196	Jr.	Laguna Niguel, CA	Transferred to Utah State
Nate Barnhart	15	F	7' 0"	190	RS Fr.	Lenexa, KS	Transferred to South Dakota State
Xavier DuSell	53	G	6' 4"	199	Jr.	Scottsdale, AZ	Transferred to Fresno State
Graham Ike	33	F	6' 9"	255	Jr.	Aurora, CO	Transferred to Gonzaga
Jake Kyman	13	G/F	6' 7"	213	Jr.	Aliso Viejo, CA	Transferred to Eastern Washington
Hunter Maldonado	24	G	6' 7"	202	RS Sr.	Colorado Springs, CO	Graduated; Signed with the Oklahoma City Thunder Summer League team
Jeremiah Oden	25	F	6' 8"	201	Jr.	Chicago, IL	Transferred to DePaul
Noah Reynolds	21	G	6' 3"	195	So.	Peoria, IL	Transferred to Wisconsin Green Bay
Nathaniel Talich	0	G	6' 4"	191	Fr.	Cheyenne, WY	Transferred to Casper College
Hunter Thompson	10	F	6' 10"	230	RS Sr.	Pine Bluffs, WY	Graduated

=== Incoming transfers ===
Name	Number	Pos.	Height	Weight	Year	Hometown	Previous school
Sam Griffin	3	G	6' 3"	188	Sr.	Miami, FL	Tulsa
Oleg Kojenets	15	F	7' 0"	228	So.	Kaunas, Lithuania	Nebraska
Akuel Kot	13	G	6' 2"	167	Sr.	Amarillo, TX	Fort Lewis
Kobe Newton	2	G	6' 2"	178	Jr.	Portland, OR	Fullerton College
Mason Walters	33	F	6' 9"	221	Gr.	Jamestown, ND	Jamestown

=== 2023 recruiting class ===
College recruiting information
Name	Hometown	School	Height	Weight	Commit date
Kael Combs; G	Nixa, MO	Nixa HS	6 ft 4 in (1.93 m)	170 lb (77 kg)	Apr 15, 2023
Kael Combs; G	Recruit ratings: Scout: Rivals: 247Sports: ESPN: (N/A)				
Nigle Cook; G	DeLand, FL	DME Academy	6 ft 6 in (1.98 m)	180 lb (82 kg)	Apr 14, 2023
Nigle Cook; G	Recruit ratings: Scout: Rivals: 247Sports: ESPN: (N/A)				
Cameron Manyawu; F	Kansas City, MO	Staley HS	6 ft 9 in (2.06 m)	215 lb (98 kg)	Apr 25, 2023
Cameron Manyawu; F	Recruit ratings: Scout: Rivals: 247Sports: ESPN: (N/A)				
Jonas Sirtautas; F	Kaunas, Lithuania	Žalgiris	6 ft 10 in (2.08 m)	185 lb (84 kg)	Aug 7, 2023
Jonas Sirtautas; F	Recruit ratings: Scout: Rivals: 247Sports: ESPN: (N/A)				
Jacob Theodosiou; G	Waterloo, ON	Western Reserve Academy	6 ft 3 in (1.91 m)	170 lb (77 kg)	Jul 1, 2023
Jacob Theodosiou; G	Recruit ratings: Scout: Rivals: 247Sports: ESPN: (N/A)				
Overall recruit ranking:
Note: In many cases, Scout, Rivals, 247Sports, On3, and ESPN may conflict in their listings of height and weight.; In these cases, the average was taken. ESPN grades are on a 100-point scale.; Sources: "203 Wyoming Basketball Commitments". Rivals.; "2023 Team Ranking". Rivals.

== Roster ==
2023–24 Wyoming Cowboys men's basketball team
Players
Coaches

Pos.	#	Name	Height	Weight	Year	Previous school	Hometown
G	0	Nigle Cook	6 ft 6 in (1.98 m)	176 lb (80 kg)	Fr	DME Academy	DeLand, FL
G	1	Brendan Wenzel	6 ft 7 in (2.01 m)	208 lb (94 kg)	Sr	Utah	San Antonio, TX
G	2	Kobe Newton	6 ft 2 in (1.88 m)	178 lb (81 kg)	Jr	Fullerton College	Portland, OR
G	3	Sam Griffin	6 ft 3 in (1.91 m)	188 lb (85 kg)	Sr	Tulsa	Miami, FL
F	5	Cam Manyawu	6 ft 9 in (2.06 m)	228 lb (103 kg)	Fr	Staley HS	Kansas City, MO
F	7	Jonas Sirtautas	6 ft 10 in (2.08 m)	185 lb (84 kg)	Fr	Žalgiris	Kaunas, Lithuania
G	10	Levi Brown (W)	6 ft 0 in (1.83 m)	167 lb (76 kg)	Fr	Laramie HS	Laramie, WY
G	11	Kael Combs	6 ft 4 in (1.93 m)	190 lb (86 kg)	Fr	Nixa HS	Nixa, MO
G	13	Akuel Kot	6 ft 2 in (1.88 m)	167 lb (76 kg)	Sr	Fort Lewis	Amarillo, TX
F	15	Oleg Kojenets	7 ft 0 in (2.13 m)	228 lb (103 kg)	So	Nebraska	Kaunas, Lithuania
G	22	Kenny Foster	6 ft 5 in (1.96 m)	193 lb (88 kg)	Sr	Smoky Hill HS	Aurora, CO
G	24	Jacob Theodosiou	6 ft 4 in (1.93 m)	188 lb (85 kg)	Fr	Western Reserve Academy	Waterloo, ON
G	31	Cort Roberson (W)	6 ft 0 in (1.83 m)	160 lb (73 kg)	So	Stanwood HS	Arlington, WA
F	33	Mason Walters	6 ft 9 in (2.06 m)	221 lb (100 kg)	GS	Jamestown	Jamestown, ND
F	44	Caden Powell	6 ft 10 in (2.08 m)	220 lb (100 kg)	So	Midway HS	Waco, TX

Head coach

- Jeff Linder (Western Colorado)

Assistant coach(es)

- Ken DeWeese (Mary Hardin–Baylor)
- Nick Whitmore (Boise State)
- Bryston Williams (Northwest Missouri State)
- Shaun Vandiver (Colorado)

Legend

- (C) Team captain
- (S) Suspended
- (I) Ineligible
- (W) Walk-on
- Injured
- Current redshirt

Roster
Last update: October 19, 2024

== Schedule and results ==
Date time, TV	Rank^{#}	Opponent^{#}	Result	Record	High points	High rebounds	High assists	Site (attendance) city, state
Exhibition
October 27, 2023*; 6:30 p.m.		MSU Denver	W 79–67	—	24 – Griffin	9 – tied	7 – Griffin	Arena-Auditorium (1,027); Laramie, WY
Non-conference regular season
November 7, 2023*; 6:30 p.m., MW Network		Northern New Mexico	W 104–56	1–0	23 – Griffin	10 – Manyawu	10 – Griffin	Arena-Auditorium (3,362); Laramie, WY
November 11, 2023*; 7:00 p.m., MW Network		Cal Poly	W 80–66	2–0	19 – Manyawu	10 – Manyawu	5 – Griffin	Arena-Auditorium (3,826); Laramie, WY
November 16, 2023*; 12:00 p.m., ESPN2		vs. Saint Louis; Myrtle Beach Invitational quarterfinals	L 69–79	2–1	17 – Powell	12 – Manyawu	4 – Griffin	HTC Center (1,201); Conway, SC
November 17, 2023*; 12:30 p.m., ESPNU		vs. Charleston; Myrtle Beach Invitational consolation 2nd round	W 67–60	3–1	24 – Griffin	8 – Wenzel	6 – Wenzel	HTC Center (1,152); Conway, SC
November 19, 2023*; 8:30 a.m., ESPNU		vs. Furman; Myrtle Beach Invitational 5th-place game	W 78–71	4–1	26 – Griffin	13 – Powell	4 – tied	HTC Center (1,136); Conway, SC
November 26, 2023*; 1:00 p.m., LHN		at No. 15 Texas	L 63–86	4–2	12 – tied	10 – Manyawu	3 – Griffin	Moody Center (9,926); Austin, TX
December 1, 2023*; 6:00 p.m., ESPN+		at Portland	L 70–81	4–3	17 – Griffin	6 – Wenzel	5 – Griffin	Chiles Center (1,076); Portland, OR
December 5, 2023*; 6:30 p.m., MW Network		South Dakota Mines	W 80–59	5–3	20 – Manyawu	11 – Manyawu	7 – Griffin	Arena-Auditorium (3,272); Laramie, WY
December 9, 2023*; 2:00 p.m., MW Network		Stephen F. Austin	W 78–70	6–3	23 – Griffin	10 – Powell	5 – Griffin	Arena-Auditorium (3,584); Laramie, WY
December 17, 2023*; 7:00 p.m., MW Network		Weber State	L 71–84	6–4	24 – Kot	7 – Manyawu	3 – Griffin	Arena-Auditorium (3,447); Laramie, WY
December 21, 2023*; 5:00 p.m.		vs. South Dakota State; Sun Bowl Invitational semifinals	W 78–65	7–4	22 – Kot	9 – Griffin	3 – Griffin	Don Haskins Center; El Paso, TX
December 22, 2023*; 7:00 p.m.		at UTEP; Sun Bowl Invitational championship	L 67–78	7–5	16 – Walters	11 – Powell	3 – Kot	Don Haskins Center (4,310); El Paso, TX
December 30, 2023*; 4:00 p.m., ESPN+		at No. 14 BYU	L 68–94	7–6	25 – Griffin	5 – tied	5 – Griffin	Marriott Center (18,987); Provo, UT
Mountain West regular season
January 2, 2024; 6:30 p.m., MW Network		San Jose State	W 75–73	8–6 (1–0)	23 – Griffin	6 – Griffin	3 – Walters	Arena-Auditorium (3,368); Laramie, WY
January 6, 2024; 8:00 p.m., CBSSN		at New Mexico	L 60–77	8–7 (1–1)	18 – Griffin	9 – Manyawu	3 – tied	The Pit (12,611); Albuquerque, NM
January 9, 2024; 7:00 p.m., MW Network		at No. 20 Utah State	L 59–83	8–8 (1–2)	17 – Walters	7 – Wenzel	3 – Kot	Smith Spectrum (8,214); Logan, UT
January 13, 2024; 2:00 p.m., MW Network		Fresno State	W 68–67	9–8 (2–2)	17 – Wenzel	8 – Wenzel	4 – Griffin	Arena-Auditorium (3,763); Laramie, WY
January 20, 2024; 5:30 p.m., MW Network		Nevada	W 98–93	10–8 (3–2)	26 – Griffin	8 – Walters	7 – Griffin	Arena-Auditorium (4,136); Laramie, WY
January 23, 2024; 7:00 p.m., CBSSN		at San Diego State	L 65–81	10–9 (3–3)	22 – Griffin	8 – Wenzel	3 – Griffin	Viejas Arena (12,414); San Diego, CA
January 27, 2024; 2:00 p.m., MW Network		No. 24 Colorado State; Border War	W 79–76 ^{OT}	11–9 (4–3)	24 – Griffin	9 – Wenzel	4 – Griffin	Arena-Auditorium (7,113); Laramie, WY
January 30, 2024; 7:00 p.m., MW Network		at Air Force	W 83–72	12–9 (5–3)	25 – Wenzel	7 – tied	5 – Kot	Clune Arena; Colorado Springs, CO
February 3, 2024; 6:00 p.m., CBSSN		at UNLV	L 48–62	12–10 (5–4)	13 – Manyawu	13 – Walters	3 – Walters	Thomas & Mack Center (5,963); Paradise, NV
February 6, 2024; 6:30 p.m., MW Network		No. 25 New Mexico	L 73–91	12–11 (5–5)	20 – Wenzel	7 – Manyawu	4 – Griffin	Arena-Auditorium (3,685); Laramie, WY
February 14, 2024; 8:00 p.m., FS1		Utah State	L 76–84	12–12 (5–6)	24 – Wenzel	11 – Manyawu	4 – Griffin	Arena-Auditorium (3,401); Laramie, WY
February 17, 2024; 8:00 p.m., MW Network		at San Jose State	W 80–75	13–12 (6–6)	21 – Griffin	7 – tied	3 – Griffin	Provident Credit Union Event Center (1,891); San Jose, CA
February 20, 2024; 9:00 p.m., CBSSN		at Nevada	L 58–76	13–13 (6–7)	17 – Wenzel	12 – Manyawu	3 – Griffin	Lawlor Events Center (8,604); Reno, NV
February 24, 2024; 5:30 p.m., MW Network		Boise State	L 72–92	13–14 (6–8)	16 – Griffin	9 – Manyawu	5 – Combs	Arena-Auditorium (5,180); Laramie, WY
February 27, 2024; 7:00 p.m., CBSSN		UNLV	L 69–75 ^{OT}	13–15 (6–9)	20 – Wenzel	10 – Manyawu	4 – Manyawu	Arena-Auditorium (3,283); Laramie, WY
March 2, 2024; 2:00 p.m., MW Network		at Colorado State; Border War	L 62–70	13–16 (6–10)	15 – Manyawu	10 – Manyawu	3 – tied	Moby Arena (8,083); Fort Collins, CO
March 5, 2024; 6:30 p.m., MW Network		Air Force	W 74–63	14–16 (7–10)	20 – Wenzel	14 – Manyawu	2 – tied	Arena-Auditorium (3,681); Laramie, WY
March 9, 2024; 5:00 p.m., MW Network		at Fresno State	W 86–47	15–16 (8–10)	17 – Kot	9 – Walters	5 – tied	Save Mart Center (4,395); Fresno, CA
Mountain West tournament
March 13, 2024; 12:00 p.m., MW Network	(8)	vs. (9) Fresno State; First round	L 73–77	15–17	23 – Kot	9 – Walters	6 – Griffin	Thomas & Mack Center; Paradise, NV
*Non-conference game. ^{#}Rankings from AP poll. (#) Tournament seedings in parentheses. All times are in Mountain.
