= 2023–24 Air Force Falcons men's basketball team =

Men's basketball team

2023–24 Air Force Falcons men's basketball
- Conference: Mountain West Conference
- Record: 9–22 (2–16 MW)
- Head coach: Joe Scott (8th overall, 4th straight season)
- Associate head coach: David Metzendorf
- Assistant coaches: Jared Czech; Lt. Col. Matt McCraw; Zack Curran; Derek Brooks; Jehyve Floyd Jon Jordan
- Home arena: Clune Arena

2023–24 Mountain West Conference men's basketball standings
	Conf.				Overall
Team	W		L	PCT	W		L	PCT
No. 22 Utah State	14	–	4	.778	28	–	7	.800
Nevada	13	–	5	.722	26	–	8	.765
Boise State	13	–	5	.722	22	–	11	.667
UNLV	12	–	6	.667	21	–	13	.618
No. 17 San Diego State	11	–	7	.611	26	–	11	.703
New Mexico †	10	–	8	.556	26	–	10	.722
Colorado State	10	–	8	.556	25	–	11	.694
Wyoming	8	–	10	.444	15	–	17	.469
Fresno State	4	–	14	.222	12	–	21	.364
San Jose State	2	–	16	.111	9	–	23	.281
Air Force	2	–	16	.111	9	–	22	.290
† 2024 Mountain West tournament winner Rankings from AP Poll

The 2023–24 Air Force Falcons men's basketball team represented the United States Air Force Academy during the 2023–24 NCAA Division I men's basketball season. The Falcons were led by head coach Joe Scott in his 4th season (8th overall) with the program and played their home games at Clune Arena in Colorado Springs, Colorado. They participated as members of the Mountain West Conference for the 25th season.

The Falcons finished 9–22, with a 2–16 record in conference play, tying for last place in the Mountain West. They lost to New Mexico in the first round of the Mountain West conference tournament.

== Previous season ==
The Falcons would finish the 2022–23 season 14–18, 5–13 in Mountain West play to finish in tenth place. They would lose to the 7th seeded UNLV end their hopes of winning the tournament.

== Offseason ==
=== Departures ===
Name	Num	Pos.	Height	Weight	Year	Hometown	Reason for departure
Jake Heidbreder	3	G	6'5"	180	Sophomore	Floyds Knobs, IN	Transferred to Clemson
Carter Murphy	4	G	6'4"	190	Senior	Phoenix, AZ	Graduate transferred to Georgia Tech
Kaleb Lichau	20	F	6'7"	205	Sophomore	Gig Harbor, WA	Left the team
Nikc Jackson	22	F	6'8"	195	Senior	Scottsdale, AZ	Graduated
Jack Murphy	23	G	6'4"	200	Sophomore	Phoenix, AZ	Transferred to UNC Wilmington
Camden Vander Zwaag	30	G	6'4"	200	Senior	Johnston, IA	Graduated

=== 2023 recruiting class ===
There were no incoming recruits for the class of 2023.

== Roster ==
2023–24 Air Force Falcons men's basketball team
Players
Coaches

Pos.	#	Name	Height	Weight	Year	Previous school	Hometown
F	0	Josh Gatete	6 ft 9 in (2.06 m)	190 lb (86 kg)	Fr	Penn High School	Granger, IN
G	1	Sam Akinrelere	6 ft 2 in (1.88 m)	228 lb (103 kg)	Fr	USAFA Prep School	Houston, TX
G	2	Dawson Sarblah	6 ft 6 in (1.98 m)	200 lb (91 kg)	Jr	Greenville High School	Greenville, AL
F	3	Luke Kearney	6 ft 7 in (2.01 m)	205 lb (93 kg)	Fr	USAFA Prep School	Phoenix, AZ
F	4	Wyatt Boeker	6 ft 8 in (2.03 m)	205 lb (93 kg)	Fr	The Woodlands Christian Academy	Tomball, TX
G	5	Ethan Taylor	6 ft 5 in (1.96 m)	195 lb (88 kg)	Jr	USAFA Prep School	Houston, TX
F	10	Caleb Walker	6 ft 9 in (2.06 m)	230 lb (104 kg)	Fr	USAFA Prep School	Jefferson City, MO
G	11	Byron Brown	6 ft 4 in (1.93 m)	205 lb (93 kg)	Jr	USAFA Prep School	Sahuarita, AZ
G/F	13	Chase Beasley	6 ft 7 in (2.01 m)	190 lb (86 kg)	Jr	USAFA Prep School	Fort Washington, MD
F	14	Beau Becker	6 ft 7 in (2.01 m)	205 lb (93 kg)	Jr	USAFA Prep School	Dallas, TX
F	15	Corbin Green	6 ft 5 in (1.96 m)	230 lb (104 kg)	So	USAFA Prep School	Midlothian, TX
F	21	Solo Jones	6 ft 8 in (2.03 m)	202 lb (92 kg)	So	USAFA Prep School	Long Beach, CA
G/F	23	Kellan Boylan	6 ft 7 in (2.01 m)	200 lb (91 kg)	So	Bishop Miege High School	Overland Park, KS
G	24	Jeffrey Mills	6 ft 4 in (1.93 m)	200 lb (91 kg)	Jr	USAFA Prep School	Flower Mound, TX
F	25	Warren Gorman	6 ft 7 in (2.01 m)	205 lb (93 kg)	Fr	Bishop Ireton High School	Washington, D.C.
F	31	Rytis Petraitis	6 ft 7 in (2.01 m)	210 lb (95 kg)	So	USAFA Prep School	Arlington, TX
F	32	Kolby Gilles	6 ft 5 in (1.96 m)	240 lb (109 kg)	Fr	USAFA Prep School	Chicago, IL
G	33	Brady Ruggles	6 ft 6 in (1.98 m)	195 lb (88 kg)	Fr	USAFA Prep School	Wheaton, IL
G	40	Nate Robinson	5 ft 9 in (1.75 m)	145 lb (66 kg)	Fr	Bishop Moore Catholic High School	Orlando, FL
C	51	Wesley Celichowski	7 ft 0 in (2.13 m)	245 lb (111 kg)	Fr	Floyd Central High School	Georgetown, IN

Head coach

- Joe Scott (Princeton)

Assistant coach(es)

- David Metzendorf (Ithaca)
- Jared Czech (Manhattanville)
- Lt. Col. Matt McCraw (Air Force)
- Zack Curran (Virginia Tech)
- Derek Brooks (Air Force)
- Jehyve Floyd (Holy Cross)
- Jon Jordan (Air Force)

Legend

- (C) Team captain
- (S) Suspended
- (I) Ineligible
- (W) Walk-on
- Injured
- Current redshirt

Roster
Last update: November 28, 2023

== Schedule and results ==
Date time, TV	Rank^{#}	Opponent^{#}	Result	Record	High points	High rebounds	High assists	Site (attendance) city, state
Non-conference regular season
November 6, 2023*; 7:30 p.m., MW Network		Portland State	L 55–62	0–1	14 – Tied	15 – Boylan	5 – Taylor	Clune Arena (1,417); Colorado Springs, CO
November 10, 2023*; 11:00 a.m., SNY		at LIU	W 82–67	1–1	26 – Taylor	12 – Taylor	6 – Taylor	Steinberg Wellness Center (812); Brooklyn, NY
November 12, 2023*; 11:00 a.m., FloHoops		at Delaware	L 57–65	1–2	26 – Taylor	5 – Boylan	5 – Mills	Bob Carpenter Center (2,028); Wilmington, DE
November 16, 2023*; 4:30 p.m., MW Network		Lindenwood; Air Force Multi-Team Event	W 76–58	2–2	21 – Taylor	6 – Tied	3 – Tied	Clune Arena (1,209); Colorado Springs, CO
November 17, 2023*; 4:30 p.m., MW Network		William & Mary; Air Force Multi-Team Event	W 80–71 ^{OT}	3–2	31 – Becker	10 – Boylan	5 – Beasley	Clune Arena (1,411); Colorado Springs, CO
November 19, 2023*; 2:00 p.m., MW Network		Omaha; Air Force Multi-Team Event	W 58–56	4–2	16 – Taylor	9 – Green	3 – Taylor	Clune Arena (1,466); Colorado Springs, CO
November 22, 2023*; 3:00 p.m., MW Network		VMI	W 64–54	5–2	19 – Tied	8 – Tied	4 – Tied	Clune Arena (1,048); Colorado Springs, CO
November 26, 2023*; 11:30 a.m., SLN		at South Dakota	W 58–57	6–2	18 – Petraitis	8 – Becker	5 – Boylan	Sanford Coyote Sports Center (1,633); Vermillion, SD
December 3, 2023*; 2:00 p.m., ESPN+		at Portland	W 80–58	7–2	20 – Petraitis	6 – Boylan	4 – Mills	Chiles Center (1,043); Portland, OR
December 9, 2023*; 4:00 p.m., MW Network		Eastern Washington	L 68–73	7–3	22 – Taylor	8 – Petraitis	4 – Petraitis	Clune Arena (2,377); Colorado Springs, CO
December 16, 2023*; 3:00 p.m., ESPN+		vs. UT Arlington; USLBM Coast-to-Coast Challenge	L 73–76	7–4	21 – Petraitis	7 – Petraitis	4 – Mills	Dickies Arena (3,752); Fort Worth, TX
December 21, 2023*; 2:00 p.m., MW Network		Northern Colorado	L 79–83	7–5	26 – Becker	9 – Boylan	8 – Petraitis	Clune Arena (1,827); Colorado Springs, CO
Mountain West regular season
January 2, 2024; 7:00 p.m., MW Network		Utah State	L 60–88	7–6 (0–1)	15 – Petraitis	5 – Tied	4 – Mills	Clune Arena (945); Colorado Springs, CO
January 9, 2024; 8:00 p.m., MW Network		at Nevada	L 54–67	7–7 (0–2)	14 – Tied	9 – Boylan	4 – Mills	Lawlor Events Center (7,645); Reno, NV
January 13, 2024; 7:30 p.m., MW Network		San Jose State	L 54–67	7–8 (0–3)	14 – Tied	9 – Boylan	4 – Mills	Clune Arena (1,804); Colorado Springs, CO
January 16, 2024; 8:30 p.m., MW Network		at Colorado State	L 69–78 ^{OT}	7–10 (0–4)	22 – Petraitis	8 – Taylor	5 – Petraitis	Moby Arena (6,345); Fort Collins, CO
January 20, 2024; 2:00 p.m., CBSSN		New Mexico	L 66–85	7–11 (0–5)	23 – Becker	9 – Mills	6 – Tied	Clune Arena (2,785); Colorado Springs, CO
January 23, 2024; 9:00 p.m., CBSSN		at UNLV	W 90–58	8–10 (1–5)	22 – Taylor	13 – Petraitis	11 – Petraitis	Thomas & Mack Center (6,392); Paradise, NV
January 27, 2024; 5:00 pm, MW Network		at Fresno State	L 70–84	8–11 (1–6)	22 – Becker	6 – Boylan	6 – Mills	Save Mart Center (4,443); Fresno, CA
January 30, 2024; 7:00 p.m., MW Network		Wyoming	L 73–82	8–12 (1–7)	32 – Boylan	6 – Becker	5 – Petraitis	Clune Arena (1,888); Colorado Springs, CO
February 3, 2024; 2:00 pm, MW Network		at Boise State	L 56–94	8–13 (1–8)	17 – Mills	5 – Tied	3 – Tied	ExtraMile Arena (12,004); Boise, ID
February 6, 2024; 8:30 p.m., FS1		No. 24 San Diego State	L 64–77	8–14 (1–9)	15 – Tied	8 – Petraitis	3 – Tied	Clune Arena (1,556); Colorado Springs, CO
February 10, 2024; 2:00 p.m., MW Network		Fresno State	L 66–68	8–15 (1–10)	20 – Mills	11 – Petraitis	6 – Petraitis	Clune Arena (2,287); Colorado Springs, CO
February 13, 2024; 8:00 p.m., NBCSBA/MW Network		at San Jose State	L 66–73	8–16 (1–11)	26 – Petraitis	8 – Tied	3 – Tied	Provident Credit Union Event Center (1,722); San Jose, CA
February 21, 2024; 9:00 p.m., FS1		UNLV	L 43–72	8–17 (1–12)	19 – Becker	6 – Becker	4 – Boylan	Clune Arena (1,089); Colorado Springs, CO
February 24, 2024; 2:00 p.m., CBSSN		at New Mexico	W 78–77	9–17 (2–12)	17 – Taylor	5 – Boylan	3 – Tied	The Pit (15,011); Albuquerque, NM
February 27, 2024; 7:00 p.m., MW Network		Boise State	L 48–79	9–18 (2–13)	19 – Petraitis	9 – Petraitis	4 – Taylor	Clune Arena (1,066); Colorado Springs, CO
March 1, 2024; 9:00 p.m., FS1		at No. 22 Utah State	L 60–72	9–19 (2–14)	15 – Taylor	6 – Tied	5 – Petraitis	Smith Spectrum (9,194); Logan, UT
March 5, 2024; 6:30 p.m., MW Network		at Wyoming	L 63–74	9–20 (2–15)	17 – Mills	9 – Petraitis	5 – Petraitis	Arena-Auditorium (3,681); Laramie, WY
March 9, 2024; 2:00 p.m., MW Network		Colorado State	L 73–82	9–21 (2–16)	27 – Petraitis	8 – Petraitis	4 – Tied	Clune Arena (4,647); Colorado Springs, CO
Mountain West tournament
March 13, 2024; 5:00 p.m., MW Network	(11)	vs. (6) New Mexico; First Round	L 56–82	9–22	26 – Petraitis	10 – Petraitis	4 – Boylan	Thomas & Mack Center (5,858); Paradise, NV
*Non-conference game. ^{#}Rankings from AP Poll. (#) Tournament seedings in parentheses. All times are in Mountain Time.
