= 2023–24 New Mexico Lobos men's basketball team =

American college basketball season

2023–24 New Mexico Lobos men's basketball

Mountain West tournament champions Ball Dawgs Classic champions

NCAA tournament, First Round
- Conference: Mountain West Conference
- Record: 26–10 (10–8 MW)
- Head coach: Richard Pitino (3rd season)
- Assistant coaches: Isaac Chew (2nd season); Tarvish Felton (2nd season); Aaron Katsuma (1st season)
- Home arena: The Pit

2023–24 Mountain West Conference men's basketball standings
	Conf.				Overall
Team	W		L	PCT	W		L	PCT
No. 22 Utah State	14	–	4	.778	28	–	7	.800
Nevada	13	–	5	.722	26	–	8	.765
Boise State	13	–	5	.722	22	–	11	.667
UNLV	12	–	6	.667	21	–	13	.618
No. 17 San Diego State	11	–	7	.611	26	–	11	.703
New Mexico †	10	–	8	.556	26	–	10	.722
Colorado State	10	–	8	.556	25	–	11	.694
Wyoming	8	–	10	.444	15	–	17	.469
Fresno State	4	–	14	.222	12	–	21	.364
San Jose State	2	–	16	.111	9	–	23	.281
Air Force	2	–	16	.111	9	–	22	.290
† 2024 Mountain West tournament winner Rankings from AP Poll

The 2023–24 New Mexico Lobos men's basketball team represented the University of New Mexico during the 2023–24 NCAA Division I men's basketball season. The Lobos, led by third-year head coach Richard Pitino, are members of the Mountain West Conference. They played their home games at The Pit in Albuquerque, New Mexico.

New Mexico finished 26–10, with a 10–8 record in the Mountain West, finishing tied for sixth place. They won the Mountain West conference tournament. As the champions of the Mountain West, New Mexico received an automatic bid to the 2024 NCAA Division I men's basketball tournament, being named the 11-seed in the West Region. The Lobos were eliminated by Clemson in the first round of the tournament.

The Lobos drew an average attendance of 13,042 in 16 home games.

== Previous season ==
The Lobos would finish 22–12, 8–10 in Mountain West play to finish in 6th place. They would win against the 11th seeded Wyoming Cowboys before losing to the 3rd seeded Utah State Aggies in the Mountain West tournament. They would make it into the 2023 National Invitation Tournament, capturing the 2nd seed in the Rutgers bracket, but would go on to lose to Utah Valley, 83–69 at The Pit.

== Offseason ==
=== Departures ===
Name	Number	Pos.	Height	Weight	Year	Hometown	Reason for departure
KJ Jenkins	0	G	6'2"	175	Senior	Atlanta, GA	Transferred to UNC Wilmington
Emmanuel Kuac	4	G	6'7"	200	Sophomore	Calgary, AB	Transferred to Detroit Mercy
Jay Allen-Tovar	12	F	6'9"	217	Senior	San Jose, CA	Transferred to Langston
Javonte Johnson	13	G	6'6"	190	RS Junior	Colorado Springs, CO	Transferred to Colorado State
Safi Fino-A-Laself	23	G	5'11"	165	Senior	Las Cruces, NM	Graduated
Morris Udeze	24	F	6'8"	245	Senior	Houston, TX	Graduated; went undrafted in 2023 NBA draft
Birima Seck	34	F	6'11"	200	Sophomore	Dakar, Senegal	Transferred to Fairfield
Josiah Allick	53	F	6'8"	240	Senior	Lincoln, NE	Transferred to Nebraska

=== Incoming transfers ===
Name	Number	Pos.	Height	Weight	Year	Hometown	Previous school
Jemarl Baker Jr.	0	G	6'4"	195	GS Senior	Los Angeles, CA	Fresno State
Isaac Mushila	12	F	6'5"	210	GS Senior	Lubumbashi, Congo	Texas A&M–Corpus Christi
Mustapha Amzil	22	F	6'9"	215	Senior	Washington, PA	Dayton
Nelly Joseph	23	C	6'9"	240	Senior	Lagos, Nigeria	Iona

=== 2023 recruiting class ===
College recruiting information
Name	Hometown	School	Height	Weight	Commit date
Tru Washington #19 SG	Phoenix, AZ	AZ Compass Prep	6 ft 3 in (1.91 m)	175 lb (79 kg)	Feb 21, 2023
Tru Washington #19 SG	Recruit ratings: Rivals: 247Sports: ESPN: (82)				
Jadyn Toppin #27 PF	Dallas, TX	Faith Family Academy	6 ft 8 in (2.03 m)	175 lb (79 kg)	Sep 19, 2022
Jadyn Toppin #27 PF	Recruit ratings: Rivals: 247Sports: ESPN: (81)				
Overall recruit ranking: Scout: – Rivals: –
Note: In many cases, Scout, Rivals, 247Sports, On3, and ESPN may conflict in their listings of height and weight.; In these cases, the average was taken. ESPN grades are on a 100-point scale.; Sources: "New Mexico Commit List for 2023". Rivals.; "Men's Basketball Recruiting". Scout.; "ESPN – New Mexico Lobos Basketball Recruiting 2023". ESPN.; "Scout.com Team Recruiting Rankings". Scout.; "2023 Team Ranking". Rivals.

== Roster ==
2023–24 New Mexico Lobos men's basketball team
Players
Coaches

Pos.	#	Name	Height	Weight	Year	Previous school	Hometown
G	0	Jemarl Baker Jr.	6 ft 5 in (1.96 m)	205 lb (93 kg)	GS	Fresno State	Menifee, CA
G	1	Braden Appelhans (redshirt)	6 ft 7 in (2.01 m)	195 lb (88 kg)	Fr	Western Reserve Academy	Blue Springs, MO
G	2	Donovan Dent	6 ft 2 in (1.88 m)	170 lb (77 kg)	So	Centennial HS	Riverside, CA
G	3	Tru Washington	6 ft 4 in (1.93 m)	195 lb (88 kg)	Fr	AZ Compass Prep	Phoenix, AZ
G	5	Jamal Mashburn Jr.	6 ft 2 in (1.88 m)	195 lb (88 kg)	Sr	Minnesota	Miami, FL
G	10	Jaelen House	6 ft 0 in (1.83 m)	170 lb (77 kg)	GS	Arizona State	Phoenix, AZ
G	11	Quinton Webb (redshirt)	6 ft 6 in (1.98 m)	205 lb (93 kg)	Fr	Etiwanda HS	San Bernardino, CA
F	12	Isaac Mushila	6 ft 5 in (1.96 m)	210 lb (95 kg)	GS	Texas A&M–Corpus Christi	Lubumbashi, Congo
F	15	JT Toppin	6 ft 9 in (2.06 m)	210 lb (95 kg)	Fr	Faith Family Academy of Oak Cliff	Dallas, TX
F	20	Deraje Agbaosi (W)	6 ft 7 in (2.01 m)	215 lb (98 kg)	Jr	North Alabama	Union Township, NJ
C	21	Sebastian Forsling	7 ft 0 in (2.13 m)	245 lb (111 kg)	Jr	RIG Mark	Floda, Sweden
F	22	Mustapha Amzil	6 ft 9 in (2.06 m)	220 lb (100 kg)	Sr	Dayton	Helsinki, Finland
C	23	Nelly Junior Joseph	6 ft 10 in (2.08 m)	240 lb (109 kg)	Sr	Iona	Benin City, Nigeria
G	24	Shane Douma-Sanchez (W)	6 ft 1 in (1.85 m)	165 lb (75 kg)	Fr	Del Norte HS	Laguna Pueblo, NM

Head coach

- Richard Pitino (Providence)

Assistant coach(es)

- Isaac Chew (Avila)
- Tarvish Felton (Southern Utah)
- Aaron Katsuma (Minnesota State)

Legend

- (C) Team captain
- (S) Suspended
- (I) Ineligible
- (W) Walk-on
- Injured
- Current redshirt

Roster

== Schedule and results ==
Date time, TV	Rank^{#}	Opponent^{#}	Result	Record	High points	High rebounds	High assists	Site (attendance) city, state
Exhibition
October 26, 2023*; 7:00 p.m., –		CSU Pueblo	W 83–65	–	26 – Dent	7 – Tied	6 – Dent	The Pit (9,290); Albuquerque, NM
November 1, 2023*; 7:00 p.m., –		New Mexico Highlands	W 86–73	–	25 – Mashburn Jr.	9 – Webb	4 – Dent	The Pit (9,474); Albuquerque, NM
Non-conference regular season
November 6, 2023*; 7:30 p.m., MW Network		Texas Southern	W 92–55	1–0	15 – Mashburn Jr.	9 – Toppin	6 – Dent	The Pit (11,106); Albuquerque, NM
November 9, 2023*; 8:00 p.m., ESPN+		at No. 23 Saint Mary's	L 58–72	1–1	15 – Dent	13 – Junior Joseph	5 – Dent	University Credit Union Pavilion (3,500); Moraga, CA
November 16, 2023*; 7:00 p.m., MW Network		UT Arlington	W 82–80	2–1	29 – Mashburn Jr.	10 – Toppin	5 – Dent	The Pit (10,484); Albuquerque, NM
November 21, 2023*; 9:15 p.m., –		vs. Toledo; Ball Dawgs Classic	W 92–84	3–1	27 – Tied	11 – Toppin	7 – Dent	Dollar Loan Center (N/A); Henderson, NV
November 22, 2023*; 7:45 p.m., –		vs. Rice; Ball Dawgs Classic	W 90–56	4–1	18 – Dent	7 – Tied	11 – Dent	Dollar Loan Center (N/A); Henderson, NV
November 24, 2023*; 4:45 p.m., –		vs. Pepperdine; Ball Dawgs Classic	W 90–71	5–1	24 – Dent	12 – Washington	7 – Dent	Dollar Loan Center (N/A); Henderson, NV
November 29, 2023*; 7:00 p.m., MW Network		Louisiana Tech	W 74–65	6–1	18 – Baker	11 – Junior Joseph	4 – Tied	The Pit (10,216); Albuquerque, NM
December 2, 2023*; 7:00 p.m., MW Network		New Mexico State; Rio Grande Rivalry	W 106–62	7–1	28 – House	6 – Mushila	10 – Dent	The Pit (15,435); Albuquerque, NM
December 6, 2023*; 7:00 p.m., MW Network		UC Santa Barbara	W 84–61	8–1	23 – Dent	9 – Mushila	8 – Dent	The Pit (10,311); Albuquerque, NM
December 9, 2023*; 3:00 p.m., –		vs. Santa Clara; Jack Jones Classic	W 93–76	9–1	22 – Dent	7 – Mushila	4 – Dent	Dollar Loan Center (N/A); Henderson, NV
December 15, 2023*; 7:00 p.m., CBSSN		at New Mexico State; Rio Grande Rivalry	W 73–72	10–1	18 – Toppin	11 – Toppin	6 – Dent	Pan American Center (5,182); Las Cruces, NM
December 20, 2023*; 7:00 p.m., MW Network		UC Irvine	W 78–65	11–1	20 – House	11 – Toppin	5 – House	The Pit (11,536); Albuquerque, NM
December 29, 2023*; 7:00 p.m., MW Network		Eastern New Mexico	W 87–54	12–1	22 – House	16 – Junior Joseph	5 – Tied	The Pit (11,962); Albuquerque, NM
Mountain West regular season
January 2, 2024; 8:30 p.m., FS1		at No. 13 Colorado State	L 68–76	12–2 (0–1)	17 – Toppin	11 – Toppin	9 – Dent	Moby Arena (5,165); Fort Collins, CO
January 6, 2024; 8:00 p.m., CBSSN		Wyoming	W 77–60	13–2 (1–1)	21 – Dent	9 – Junior Joseph	5 – House	The Pit (12,611); Albuquerque, NM
January 9, 2024; 8:30 p.m., FS1		at UNLV	L 73–83	13–3 (1–2)	16 – Tied	9 – Junior Joseph	6 – House	Thomas & Mack Center (5,760); Paradise, NV
January 13, 2024; 12:00 p.m., CBS		No. 19 San Diego State; Rivalry	W 88–70	14–3 (2–2)	26 – House	16 – Toppin	5 – House	The Pit (15,437); Albuquerque, NM
January 16, 2024; 8:30 p.m., FS1		No. 16 Utah State	W 99–86	15–3 (3–2)	26 – Junior Joseph	8 – Junior Joseph	14 – Dent	The Pit (13,106); Albuquerque, NM
January 20, 2024; 2:00 p.m., CBSSN		at Air Force	W 85–66	16–3 (4–2)	25 – Toppin	13 – Toppin	3 – Tied	Clune Arena (2,785); Colorado Springs, CO
January 24, 2024; 9:00 p.m., CBSSN	No. 25	at San José State	W 95–75	17–3 (5–2)	18 – House	10 – Toppin	5 – Dent	Provident Credit Union Event Center (3,118); San Jose, CA
January 28, 2024; 8:00 p.m., FS1	No. 25	Nevada	W 89–55	18–3 (6–2)	21 – House	10 – Junior Joseph	6 – House	The Pit (15,021); Albuquerque, NM
January 31, 2024; 8:30 p.m., FS1	No. 19	Boise State	L 78–86	18–4 (6–3)	31 – Dent	15 – Toppin	3 – House	The Pit (13,239); Albuquerque, NM
February 6, 2024; 6:30 p.m., MW Network	No. 25	at Wyoming	W 91–73	19–4 (7–3)	19 – Dent	13 – Toppin	7 – Dent	Arena-Auditorium (3,685); Laramie, WY
February 10, 2024; 6:00 p.m., CBSSN	No. 25	UNLV	L 77–80	19–5 (7–4)	20 – Tied	12 – Toppin	4 – Amzil	The Pit (15,435); Albuquerque, NM
February 13, 2024; 9:00 p.m., CBSSN		at Nevada	W 83–82	20–5 (8–4)	17 – Mashburn Jr.	13 – Junior Joesph	7 – Dent	Lawlor Events Center (8,293); Reno, NV
February 16, 2024; 8:00 p.m., FS1		at San Diego State; Rivalry	L 70–81	20–6 (8–5)	22 – House	11 – Amzil	2 – Tied	Viejas Arena (12,414); San Diego, CA
February 21, 2024; 8:00 p.m., CBSSN		No. 22 Colorado State	W 68–66	21–6 (9–5)	16 – Tied	12 – Junior Joseph	3 – Tied	The Pit (14,618); Albuquerque, NM
February 24, 2024; 2:00 p.m., CBSSN		Air Force	L 77–78	21–7 (9–6)	17 – Joseph	9 – Joseph	5 – Dent	The Pit (15,011); Albuquerque, NM
March 2, 2024; 6:00 p.m., CBSSN		at Boise State	L 79–89	21–8 (9–7)	21 – Toppin	12 – Junior Joseph	6 – Dent	ExtraMile Arena (12,184); Boise, ID
March 6, 2024; 8:30 p.m., FS1		Fresno State	W 79–58	22–8 (10–7)	19 – Mashburn Jr.	16 – Toppin	7 – Dent	The Pit (13,140); Albuquerque, NM
March 9, 2024; 6:30 p.m., CBSSN		at No. 22 Utah State	L 85–87	22–9 (10–8)	18 – Amzil	10 – Junior Joseph	6 – House	Smith Spectrum (10,270); Logan, UT
Mountain West tournament
March 13, 2024; 5:00 p.m., Stadium	(6)	vs. (11) Air Force; First Round	W 82–56	23–9	18 – Toppin	11 – Toppin	9 – Dent	Thomas & Mack Center (5,858); Paradise, NV
March 14, 2024; 9:30 p.m., CBSSN	(6)	vs. (3) Boise State; Quarterfinals	W 76–66	24–9	29 – House	13 – Toppin	4 – Dent	Thomas & Mack Center (8,561); Paradise, NV
March 15, 2024; 10:00 p.m., CBSSN	(6)	vs. (7) Colorado State; Semifinals	W 74–61	25–9	19 – House	12 – Joseph	8 – House	Thomas & Mack Center (13,213); Paradise, NV
March 16, 2024; 4:00 p.m., CBS	(6)	vs. (5) San Diego State; Championship	W 68–61	26–9	28 – House	11 – Toppin	4 – Dent	Thomas & Mack Center (11,112); Paradise, NV
NCAA Tournament
March 22, 2024*; 1:10 p.m., TruTV	(11 W)	vs. (6 W) Clemson; First Round	L 56–77	26–10	14 – Joseph	12 – Joseph	2 – House	FedExForum (12,754); Memphis, TN
*Non-conference game. ^{#}Rankings from AP Poll. (#) Tournament seedings in parentheses. All times are in Mountain Time.

== Rankings ==
Ranking movements Legend: ██ Increase in ranking ██ Decrease in ranking — = Not ranked RV = Received votes
	Week																					
Poll	Pre	1	2	3	4	5	6	7	8	9	10	11	12	13	14	15	16	17	18	19	20	Final
AP	RV	—	—	—	—	—	RV	RV	RV	RV	RV	RV	25	19	25	RV	RV	RV	RV	RV	RV	RV
Coaches	—	—	—	—	—	—	RV	RV	RV	RV	RV	RV	25	20	25	RV	—	—	—	—	RV	—
