= 2023–24 Boise State Broncos men's basketball team =

American college basketball season

2023–24 Boise State Broncos men's basketball

NCAA tournament, First Four
- Conference: Mountain West Conference
- Record: 22–11 (13–5 MW)
- Head coach: Leon Rice (14th season)
- Assistant coaches: Mike Burns (8th season); Tim Duryea (6th season); Roberto Bergersen (2nd season); David Moats (6th season)
- Home arena: ExtraMile Arena

2023–24 Mountain West Conference men's basketball standings
	Conf.				Overall
Team	W		L	PCT	W		L	PCT
No. 22 Utah State	14	–	4	.778	28	–	7	.800
Nevada	13	–	5	.722	26	–	8	.765
Boise State	13	–	5	.722	22	–	11	.667
UNLV	12	–	6	.667	21	–	13	.618
No. 17 San Diego State	11	–	7	.611	26	–	11	.703
New Mexico †	10	–	8	.556	26	–	10	.722
Colorado State	10	–	8	.556	25	–	11	.694
Wyoming	8	–	10	.444	15	–	17	.469
Fresno State	4	–	14	.222	12	–	21	.364
San Jose State	2	–	16	.111	9	–	23	.281
Air Force	2	–	16	.111	9	–	22	.290
† 2024 Mountain West tournament winner Rankings from AP Poll

The 2023–24 Boise State Broncos men's basketball team represented Boise State University during the 2023–24 NCAA Division I men's basketball season. The Broncos, led by fourteenth-year head coach Leon Rice, were members of the Mountain West Conference (MWC). They played their home games at ExtraMile Arena in Boise, Idaho.

== Previous season ==
The Broncos would finish the 2022–23 season 24–10, 13–5 in Mountain West play, to finish in 2nd place. They beat 7th-seeded UNLV in the first round of the Mountain West tournament and then lost to 3rd-seeded Utah State to end their hopes of winning the tournament. They made it to the first round of the 2023 NCAA Division I men's basketball tournament, where they lost to Northwestern in the first round to end their season.

== Offseason ==
=== Departures ===
Name	Number	Pos.	Height	Weight	Year	Hometown	Reason for departure
Sadraque Nganga	1	G	6'9"	205	Freshman	Chandler, AZ	Transferred to Seton Hall
Burke Smith	4	F	6'11	230	RS Sophomore	Glen Allen, VA	Transferred to Pacific
Marcus Shaver Jr.	10	G	6'2"	185	RS Senior	Phoenix, AZ	Graduated
Pavle Kuzmanovic	13	G	6'5"	190	Junior	Lužnica, Serbia	Entered transfer portal
Naje Smith	23	F	6'7"	205	GS Senior	Spokane, WA	Graduated
Lukas Milner	25	C	6'10"	238	GS Senior	Olathe, KS	Graduated

=== Incoming transfers ===
Name	Number	Pos.	Height	Weight	Year	Hometown	Previous school
O'Mar Stanley	1	F	6'8"	240	Sophomore	Branson, MO	St. John's
Cam Martin	31	F	6'8"	210	RS Senior	Yukon, OK	Kansas
Roddie Anderson III	0	G	6'2"	190	Freshman	Huntington Beach, CA	UC San Diego

=== Recruiting classes ===
==== 2023 recruiting class ====
College recruiting information
Name	Hometown	School	Height	Weight	Commit date
Chris Lockett Jr. SF	New Orleans, LA	Isidore Newman School	6 ft 5 in (1.96 m)	200 lb (91 kg)	Nov 16, 2022
Chris Lockett Jr. SF	Recruit ratings: Rivals: 247Sports: ESPN: (82)				
Andrew Meadow; PF	Stevenson Ranch, CA	West Ranch	6 ft 7 in (2.01 m)	200 lb (91 kg)	Aug 11, 2022
Andrew Meadow; PF	Recruit ratings: 247Sports:				
Emmanuel Ugbo; PF	Lagos, Nigeria	Riesen Ludwigsburg	6 ft 8 in (2.03 m)	235 lb (107 kg)	Dec 12, 2022
Emmanuel Ugbo; PF	Recruit ratings: No ratings found				
Overall recruit ranking:
Note: In many cases, Scout, Rivals, 247Sports, On3, and ESPN may conflict in their listings of height and weight.; In these cases, the average was taken. ESPN grades are on a 100-point scale.; Sources: "2023 Team Ranking". Rivals.

==== 2024 recruiting class ====
College recruiting information (2024)
Name	Hometown	School	Height	Weight	Commit date
Julian Bowie; PG	Pocatello, ID	Pocatello	6 ft 3 in (1.91 m)	180 lb (82 kg)	Aug 23, 2022
Julian Bowie; PG	Recruit ratings: No ratings found				
Pearson Carmichael; SG	Bend, OR	Summit	6 ft 6 in (1.98 m)	190 lb (86 kg)	Nov 11, 2022
Pearson Carmichael; SG	Recruit ratings: No ratings found				
Overall recruit ranking:
Note: In many cases, Scout, Rivals, 247Sports, On3, and ESPN may conflict in their listings of height and weight.; In these cases, the average was taken. ESPN grades are on a 100-point scale.; Sources: "2024 Team Ranking". Rivals.

== Roster ==
2023–24 Boise State Broncos men's basketball team
Players
Coaches

Pos.	#	Name	Height	Weight	Year	Previous school	Hometown
G	0	Roddie III Anderson	6 ft 3 in (1.91 m)	190 lb (86 kg)	So	UC San Diego	Huntington Beach, CA
F	1	O'Mar Stanley	6 ft 8 in (2.03 m)	240 lb (109 kg)	Jr	St. John's	Overland Park, KS
F	2	Tyson Degenhart	6 ft 8 in (2.03 m)	235 lb (107 kg)	Jr	Mt. Spokane High School	Spokane, WA
G	3	Kobe Young	6 ft 7 in (2.01 m)	208 lb (94 kg)	RS So	Chiawana High School	Pasco, WA
G	4	Chris Jr. Lockett	6 ft 4 in (1.93 m)	205 lb (93 kg)	Fr	Isidore Newman School	New Orleans, LA
G	5	RJ II Keene	6 ft 7 in (2.01 m)	202 lb (92 kg)	RS So	Concordia Lutheran High School	The Woodlands, TX
G	8	Kade Rice (W)	6 ft 4 in (1.93 m)	188 lb (85 kg)	RS Fr	Bishop Kelly High School	Boise, ID
F	10	Emmanuel Ugbo	6 ft 8 in (2.03 m)	235 lb (107 kg)	Fr	Riesen Ludwigsburg	Barendrecht, Netherlands
G	11	Chibuzo Agbo	6 ft 7 in (2.01 m)	226 lb (103 kg)	Sr	Texas Tech	San Diego, CA
G	12	Max Rice (W)	6 ft 5 in (1.96 m)	205 lb (93 kg)	GS	Bishop Kelly High School	Boise, ID
F	13	Andrew Meadow	6 ft 7 in (2.01 m)	218 lb (99 kg)	Fr	West Ranch High School	Santa Clarita, CA
C	14	Mohamed Sylla	6 ft 11 in (2.11 m)	243 lb (110 kg)	GS	Detroit Mercy	Abidjan, Ivory Coast
G	15	Jace Whiting	6 ft 3 in (1.91 m)	188 lb (85 kg)	So	Burley High School	Burley, ID
G	20	Vince Barringer (W)	6 ft 6 in (1.98 m)	218 lb (99 kg)	RS Fr	Saint Francis High School	San Carlos, CA
G	22	Sam Winter (W)	6 ft 2 in (1.88 m)	192 lb (87 kg)	Sr	Montesano High School	Montesano, WA
G	30	Alex Martin (W)	6 ft 5 in (1.96 m)	218 lb (99 kg)	Fr	Webb City High School	Webb City, MO
F	31	Cam Martin	6 ft 9 in (2.06 m)	234 lb (106 kg)	GS	Kansas	Yukon, OK

Head coach

- Leon Rice (Washington State)

Assistant coach(es)

- Mike Burns (Central Washington)
- Tim Duryea (North Texas)
- Roberto Bergersen (Boise State)
- David Moats (Florida)

Legend

- (C) Team captain
- (S) Suspended
- (I) Ineligible
- (W) Walk-on
- Injured
- Current redshirt

Roster
Last update: August 22, 2023

== Schedule and results ==
Date time, TV	Rank^{#}	Opponent^{#}	Result	Record	High points	High rebounds	High assists	Site (attendance) city, state
Non-conference regular season
November 7, 2023*; 7:00 p.m., KTVB/MW Network		Vanguard	W 89–55	1–0	19 – Agbo	13 – C. Martin	5 – Anderson III	ExtraMile Arena (9,501); Boise, ID
November 12, 2023*; 2:00 p.m., KTVB/MW Network		San Francisco	W 63–58	2–0	17 – Degenhart	6 – M. Rice	3 – C. Martin	ExtraMile Arena (10,520); Boise, ID
November 19, 2023*; 11:00 a.m., ACCNX/ESPN+		at Clemson	L 68–85	2–1	18 – Agbo	7 – Martin	4 – Martin	Littlejohn Coliseum (5,748); Clemson, SC
November 23, 2023*; 6:00 p.m., ESPNU		vs. Virginia Tech; ESPN Events Invitational quarterfinals	L 75–82	2–2	18 – Degenhart	8 – Degenhart	4 – Agbo	State Farm Field House (2,458); Orlando, FL
November 24, 2023*; 6:00 p.m., ESPNU		vs. VCU; ESPN Events Invitational consolation 2nd round	W 65–61	3–2	12 – Meadow	7 – Martin	2 – Stanley	State Farm Field House (2,579); Orlando, FL
November 26, 2023*; 2:00 p.m., ESPNU		vs. Butler; ESPN Events Invitational 5th-place game	L 56–70	3–3	12 – Degenhart	7 – Degenhart	3 – Whiting	State Farm Field House (234); Orlando, FL
December 1, 2023*; 8:30 p.m., FS1		vs. Saint Mary's	W 63–60	4–3	17 – Degenhart	8 – Agbo	5 – Degenhart	Mountain America Center (4,985); Idaho Falls, ID
December 5, 2023*; 7:00 p.m., KTVB/MW Network		North Texas	W 69–64	5–3	27 – Agbo	4 – Stanley	3 – tied	ExtraMile Arena (9,865); Boise, ID
December 9, 2023*; 2:00 p.m., KTVB/MW Network		Western Oregon	W 109–70	6–3	28 – M. Rice	7 – Stanley	6 – Martin	ExtraMile Arena (8,960); Boise, ID
December 12, 2023*; 7:00 p.m., KTVB/MW Network		Northwestern State	W 95–54	7–3	20 – Degenhart	9 – Martin	6 – Martin	ExtraMile Arena (8,471); Boise, ID
December 17, 2023*; 2:00 p.m., KTVB/MW Network		Cal State Fullerton	W 88–65	8–3	24 – M. Rice	10 – Stanley	4 – tied	ExtraMile Arena (9,178); Boise, ID
December 21, 2023*; 9:00 p.m., P12N		vs. Washington State; Numerica Holiday Hoops	L 61–66	8–4	23 – Stanley	10 – Degenhart	3 – Anderson III	Spokane Arena (5,146); Spokane, WA
December 29, 2023*; 7:00 p.m., KTVB/MW Network		Utah Valley	W 85–63	9–4	22 – M. Rice	7 – Stanley	3 – M. Rice	ExtraMile Arena (10,764); Boise, ID
Mountain West regular season
January 5, 2024; 8:30 p.m., FS1		at San Jose State	W 78–69	10–4 (1–0)	30 – Stanley	11 – Stanley	4 – M. Rice	Provident Credit Union Event Center (2,287); San Jose, CA
January 9, 2024; 7:00 p.m., KTVB/MW Network		No. 17 Colorado State	W 65–58	11–4 (2–0)	17 – Stanley	11 – Stanley	8 – Anderson III	ExtraMile Arena (12,058); Boise, ID
January 12, 2024; 8:30 p.m., FS1		at Nevada	W 64–56	12–4 (3–0)	20 – Degenhart	9 – tied	4 – tied	Lawlor Events Center (10,191); Reno, NV
January 16, 2024; 7:00 p.m., CBSSN		UNLV	L 64–68	12–5 (3–1)	24 – Degenhart	12 – Stanley	2 – tied	ExtraMile Arena (9,863); Boise, ID
January 20, 2024; 11:00 a.m., CBS		San Diego State	W 67–66	13–5 (4–1)	17 – Stanley	7 – tied	3 – M. Rice	ExtraMile Arena (11,705); Boise, ID
January 23, 2024; 8:30 p.m., FS1		at Fresno State	W 72–68	14–5 (5–1)	16 – tied	5 – tied	4 – Stanley	Save Mart Center (3,872); Fresno, CA
January 27, 2024; 2:00 p.m., KTVB/MW Network		No. 18 Utah State	L 84–90 ^{OT}	14–6 (5–2)	24 – Degenhart	9 – Stanley	2 – tied	ExtraMile Arena (12,058); Boise, ID
January 31, 2024; 8:30 p.m., FS1		at No. 19 New Mexico	W 86–78	15–6 (6–2)	35 – M. Rice	14 – Stanley	3 – tied	The Pit (13,239); Albuquerque, NM
February 3, 2024; 2:00 p.m., KTVB/MW Network		Air Force	W 94–56	16–6 (7–2)	29 – Degenhart	6 – tied	7 – C. Martin	ExtraMile Arena (12,004); Boise, ID
February 6, 2024; 7:00 p.m., MW Network		at Colorado State	L 62–75	16–7 (7–3)	25 – Degenhart	7 – Degenhart	2 – Anderson III	Moby Arena (7,221); Fort Collins, CO
February 10, 2024; 8:00 p.m., FS1		at No. 22 Utah State	L 61–80	16–8 (7–4)	17 – Degenhart	8 – Degenhart	2 – tied	Smith Spectrum (10,270); Logan, UT
February 17, 2024; 5:30 p.m., CBSSN		Fresno State	W 90–66	17–8 (8–4)	24 – Degenhart	9 – Degenhart	4 – tied	ExtraMile Arena (11,595); Boise, ID
February 20, 2024; 8:30 p.m., FS1		San Jose State	W 82–50	18–8 (9–4)	15 – Degenhart	8 – tied	4 – tied	ExtraMile Arena (9,049); Boise, ID
February 24, 2024; 5:30 p.m., MW Network		at Wyoming	W 92–72	19–8 (10–4)	22 – Degenhart	7 – Stanley	3 – tied	Arena-Auditorium (5,180); Laramie, WY
February 27, 2024; 7:00 p.m., MW Network		at Air Force	W 79–48	20–8 (11–4)	21 – Degenhart	6 – tied	2 – tied	Clune Arena (1,066); Colorado Springs, CO
March 2, 2024; 6:00 p.m., CBSSN		New Mexico	W 89–79	21–8 (12–4)	24 – Stanley	13 – Stanley	4 – Anderson III	ExtraMile Arena (12,184); Boise, ID
March 5, 2024; 9:00 p.m., FS1		Nevada	L 66–76	21–9 (12–5)	15 – tied	12 – Degenhart	3 – Rice	ExtraMile Arena (11,242); Boise, ID
March 8, 2024; 8:00 p.m., FS1		at No. 21 San Diego State	W 79–77 ^{OT}	22–9 (13–5)	16 – Anderson	11 – Degenhart	3 – Anderson	Viejas Arena (12,414); San Diego, CA
Mountain West tournament
March 14, 2024; 9:30 p.m., CBSSN	(3)	vs. (6) New Mexico; Quarterfinals	L 66–76	22–10	23 – Degenhart	12 – tied	3 – Anderson III	Thomas & Mack Center (8,561); Paradise, NV
NCAA tournament
March 20, 2024*; 7:10 pm, TruTV	(10 S)	vs. (10 S) Colorado; First Four	L 53–60	22–11	17 – Agbo	11 – Stanley	2 – Rice	UD Arena; Dayton, OH
*Non-conference game. ^{#}Rankings from AP poll. (#) Tournament seedings in parentheses. S=South region. All times are in Mountain.

== Rankings ==
Ranking movements Legend: RV = Received votes
	Week																				
Poll	Pre	1	2	3	4	5	6	7	8	9	10	11	12	13	14	15	16	17	18	19	Final
AP	RV	RV										RV	RV	RV			RV	RV			
Coaches	RV	RV										RV		RV		RV	RV	RV			RV

*AP does not release post-NCAA tournament rankings.
