= 2023–24 Fresno State Bulldogs men's basketball team =

American college basketball season

2023–24 Fresno State Bulldogs men's basketball
- Conference: Mountain West Conference
- Record: 12–21 (4–14 MW)
- Head coach: Justin Hutson (6th season)
- Assistant coaches: Keith Brown; Vonn Webb; George Aramide
- Home arena: Save Mart Center (Capacity: 15,596)

2023–24 Mountain West Conference men's basketball standings
	Conf.				Overall
Team	W		L	PCT	W		L	PCT
No. 22 Utah State	14	–	4	.778	28	–	7	.800
Nevada	13	–	5	.722	26	–	8	.765
Boise State	13	–	5	.722	22	–	11	.667
UNLV	12	–	6	.667	21	–	13	.618
No. 17 San Diego State	11	–	7	.611	26	–	11	.703
New Mexico †	10	–	8	.556	26	–	10	.722
Colorado State	10	–	8	.556	25	–	11	.694
Wyoming	8	–	10	.444	15	–	17	.469
Fresno State	4	–	14	.222	12	–	21	.364
San Jose State	2	–	16	.111	9	–	23	.281
Air Force	2	–	16	.111	9	–	22	.290
† 2024 Mountain West tournament winner Rankings from AP Poll

The 2023–24 Fresno State Bulldogs men's basketball team represented California State University, Fresno in the 2023–24 NCAA Division I men's basketball season. The Bulldogs were led by head coach Justin Hutson in his sixth and final season. The Bulldogs played their home games at the Save Mart Center as members of the Mountain West Conference.

== Previous season ==
The Bulldogs finished the 2022–23 season 11–20, 6–12 in Mountain West play to finish in a tie for eight place. They lost to Colorado State in the first round of the MWC tournament.

== Offseason ==
=== Departures ===
Name	Number	Pos.	Height	Weight	Year	Hometown	Reason for departure
Jemarl Baker Jr.	1	G	6'5"	195	GS Senior	Menifee, CA	Graduated
Alexander Gorton	4	G	6'3"	190	Senior	Jonesboro, AR	Graduated
Jordan Campbell	5	G	6'4"	200	RS Senior	Adelanto, CA	Graduate transferred
Isaih Moore	11	F	6'10"	195	Senior	Columbia, SC	Graduated
Jordan Brinson	12	G	6'2"	170	Junior	Inglewood, CA	Transferred to Cal State Northridge
Joseph Hunter	14	G	6'5"	190	Freshman	Fresno, CA	Dismissed from the team due to felony gun charges
Dustin Whitaker	22	G	6'5"	185	Junior	Romeoville, IL	Transferred to Purdue Fort Wayne
Anthony Holland	25	G	6'5"	225	Senior	Riverside, CA	Graduate transferred to Washington

=== Incoming transfers ===
Name	Number	Pos.	Height	Weight	Year	Hometown	Previous college
Jalen Weaver	5	G	6'5"	195	Junior	Aurora, CO	Salt Lake CC
Enoch Boakye	13	C	6'10"	240	Junior	Brampton, ON	Arizona State
Zaylon Thomas	14	G	6'5"		Senior	Sacramento, CA	Walk-on; UCLA T&F
Isaiah Pope	21	G	6'5'	202	Senior	Yorba Linda, CA	Utah Tech
Pierce Geneste Jr.	34	F	6'11"	215	Sophomore	Los Angeles, CA	Louisiana Tech
Chase Courtney	40	F	6'10"	230	Junior	Scottsdale, AZ	San Diego City College
Xavier DuSell	53	G	6'4"	199	Senior	Scottsdale, AZ	Wyoming

=== 2023 recruiting class ===
College recruiting information
Name	Hometown	School	Height	Weight	Commit date
Isaac Taveras; SG	Jacksonville, FL	North Florida Education Institute	6 ft 4 in (1.93 m)	175 lb (79 kg)	Jun 13, 2023
Isaac Taveras; SG	Recruit ratings: Rivals: 247Sports: ESPN: (NR)				
Overall recruit ranking: Scout: – Rivals: –
Note: In many cases, Scout, Rivals, 247Sports, On3, and ESPN may conflict in their listings of height and weight.; In these cases, the average was taken. ESPN grades are on a 100-point scale.; Sources: "Fresno State Commit List for 2023". Rivals.; "Men's Basketball Recruiting". Scout.; "ESPN – Fresno State Bulldogs Basketball Recruiting 2023". ESPN.; "Scout.com Team Recruiting Rankings". Scout.; "2023 Team Ranking". Rivals.

== Roster ==
2023–24 Fresno State Bulldogs men's basketball team
Players
Coaches

Pos.	#	Name	Height	Weight	Year	Previous school	Hometown
G	0	Donavan Yap Jr.	6 ft 5 in (1.96 m)	182 lb (83 kg)	Sr	UNLV	Las Vegas, NV
G	1	Isaac Taveres	6 ft 5 in (1.96 m)	186 lb (84 kg)	Fr	North Florida Educational Institute	Santo Domingo, DR
G	3	Isaiah Hill	6 ft 0 in (1.83 m)	170 lb (77 kg)	GS	Tulsa	Bakersfield, CA
C	4	Chuks Isitua	6 ft 11 in (2.11 m)	226 lb (103 kg)	Jr	IUPUI	Lagos, Nigeria
G	5	Jalen Weaver	6 ft 4 in (1.93 m)	200 lb (91 kg)	Jr	Salt Lake CC	Aurora, CO
G	12	Jeff Sims Jr. (W)	6 ft 1 in (1.85 m)	165 lb (75 kg)	RS Fr	Santa Rosa Academy	Menifee, CA
C	13	Enoch Boakye	6 ft 10 in (2.08 m)	250 lb (113 kg)	Jr	Arizona State	Brampton, ON
G	14	Zaylon Thomas (W)	6 ft 5 in (1.96 m)	185 lb (84 kg)	Sr	UCLA T&F	Sacramento, CA
G	21	Isaiah Pope	6 ft 5 in (1.96 m)	200 lb (91 kg)	Sr	Utah Tech	Yorba Linda, CA
G/F	23	Leo Colimerio	6 ft 7 in (2.01 m)	193 lb (88 kg)	Sr	Wasatch Academy	São Paulo, Brazil
G	33	Steven Vasquez (W)	6 ft 2 in (1.88 m)	190 lb (86 kg)	Jr	St. Joseph HS	Santa Maria, CA
F	34	Pierce Geneste Jr.	6 ft 11 in (2.11 m)	230 lb (104 kg)	So	Louisiana Tech	Port-au-Prince, Haiti
C	35	Eduardo Andre	6 ft 11 in (2.11 m)	248 lb (112 kg)	Sr	AZ Compass Prep	London, England
F	40	Chase Courtney	6 ft 10 in (2.08 m)	230 lb (104 kg)	Jr	San Diego City College	Scottsdale, Arizona
G	53	Xavier DuSell	6 ft 4 in (1.93 m)	200 lb (91 kg)	Sr	Wyoming	Scottsdale, AZ

Head coach

- Justin Hutson (Cal State Bakersfield)

Assistant coach(es)

- Keith Brown (Pacific)
- Vonn Webb (Western New Mexico)
- George Aramide (Thompson Rivers)

Legend

- (C) Team captain
- (S) Suspended
- (I) Ineligible
- (W) Walk-on
- Injured
- Current redshirt

Roster

== Schedule and results ==
Date time, TV	Rank^{#}	Opponent^{#}	Result	Record	High points	High rebounds	High assists	Site (attendance) city, state
Non-conference regular season
November 6, 2023*; 7:30 p.m., MW Network		Fresno Pacific	W 77–66	1–0	19 – DuSell	9 – Andre	7 – Hill	Save Mart Center (4,419); Fresno, CA
November 11, 2023*; 4:00 p.m., ESPN+		at Kent State	L 69–79	1–1	18 – DuSell	6 – Tied	8 – Hill	MAC Center (2,655); Kent, OH
November 15, 2023*; 7:30 p.m., MW Network		Morgan State; Cancún Challenge campus site game	W 87–68	2–1	23 – Yap Jr.	9 – Boakye	7 – Hill	Save Mart Center; Fresno, CA
November 21, 2023*; 5:30 p.m., CBSSN		vs. New Mexico State; Cancún Challenge Riviera Division semifinals	W 81–76 ^{OT}	3–1	21 – Hill	8 – Colimerio	5 – Hill	Hard Rock Hotel Riviera Maya (516); Cancún, Mexico
November 22, 2023*; 5:30 p.m., CBSSN		vs. No. 22 James Madison; Cancún Challenge Riviera Division championship	L 64–95	3–2	12 – Tied	13 – Boakye	3 – Hill	Hard Rock Hotel Riviera Maya (683); Cancún, Mexico
November 27, 2023*; 6:00 p.m., MW Network		UC Santa Barbara	L 65–69	3–3	19 – Hill	16 – Boakye	8 – Hill	Save Mart Center (2,796); Fresno, CA
December 1, 2023*; 6:00 p.m., ESPN+		vs. No. 19 BYU	L 56–85	3–4	14 – Hill	7 – Andre	5 – Hill	Delta Center (11,360); Salt Lake City, UT
December 5, 2023*; 7:00 p.m., MW Network		Idaho State	W 79–67	4–4	16 – Andre	7 – Andre	5 – Yap Jr.	Save Mart Center (2,638); Fresno, CA
December 9, 2023*; 4:00 p.m., MW Network		Pacific	W 89–56	5–4	19 – DuSell	10 – Andre	5 – Hill	Save Mart Center (1,109); Fresno, CA
December 15, 2023*; 7:00 p.m., MW Network		Cal State Bakersfield	W 61–58	6–4	13 – Hill	8 – Boakye	9 – Hill	Save Mart Center (3,166); Fresno, CA
December 18, 2023*; 7:00 p.m., MW Network		Portland State	L 72–75 ^{OT}	6–5	14 – Pope	10 – Andre	8 – Hill	Save Mart Center (3,003); Fresno, CA
December 22, 2023*; 5:00 p.m., ESPN+		at San Francisco	L 57–77	6–6	9 – DuSell	8 – Boakye	3 – Hill	War Memorial Gymnasium (1,488); San Francisco, CA
December 29, 2023*; 7:00 p.m., ESPN+		at San Diego	W 71–67	7–6	13 – Pope	14 – Boakye	4 – Pope	Jenny Craig Pavilion (1,197); San Diego, CA
Mountain West regular season
January 3, 2024; 7:30 p.m., FS1		at San Diego State	L 47–74	7–7 (0–1)	10 – DuSell	5 – Tied	2 – Tied	Viejas Arena (12,414); San Diego, CA
January 6, 2024; 4:00 p.m.		Nevada	L 57–72	7–8 (0–2)	18 – Pope	11 – Boakye	7 – Hill	Save Mart Center (5,083); Fresno, CA
January 13, 2024; 1:00 p.m.		at Wyoming	L 67–68	7–9 (0–3)	15 – Pope	7 – Pope	3 – Tied	Arena-Auditorium (3,763); Laramie, WY
January 16, 2024; 7:00 p.m., MW Network		San Jose State	W 85–82	8–9 (1–3)	24 – Hill	13 – Boakye	9 – Hill	Save Mart Center (3,146); Fresno, CA
January 20, 2024; 6:00 p.m.		at No. 16 Utah State	L 62–83	8–10 (1–4)	16 – Pope	7 – Boakye	10 – Hill	Smith Spectrum (8,851); Logan, UT
January 23, 2024; 7:30 p.m., FS1		Boise State	L 68–72	8–11 (1–5)	17 – Yap Jr.	5 – Tied	6 – Hill	Save Mart Center (3,872); Fresno, CA
January 27, 2024; 4:00 p.m., MW Network		Air Force	W 84–70	9–11 (2–5)	19 – Boakye	10 – Boakye	10 – Hill	Save Mart Center (4,433); Fresno, CA
January 30, 2024; 8:00 p.m., FS1		at UNLV	L 69–78	9–12 (2–6)	16 – Boakye	10 – Boakye	9 – Hill	Thomas & Mack Center (5,980); Paradise, NV
February 3, 2024; 7:00 p.m., CBSSN		Colorado State	L 61–73	9–13 (2–7)	20 – Yap Jr.	7 – Boakye	9 – Hill	Save Mart Center (4,331); Fresno, CA
February 6, 2024; 7:00 p.m., NBCSBA		at San Jose State	W 69–57	10–13 (3–7)	23 – DuSell	14 – Boakye	10 – Hill	Provident Credit Union Event Center (3,284); San Jose, CA
February 10, 2024; 2:00 p.m.		at Air Force	W 68–66	11–13 (4–7)	29 – DuSell	10 – Boakye	7 – Hill	Clune Arena (2,287); Colorado Springs, CO
February 14, 2024; 8:00 p.m., CBSSN		UNLV	L 65–67	11–14 (4–8)	30 – Colimerio	4 – Colimerio	7 – Hill	Save Mart Center (2,915); Fresno, CA
February 17, 2024; 4:30 p.m., CBSSN		at Boise State	L 66–90	11–15 (4–9)	17 – Pope	4 – Tied	6 – Hill	ExtraMile Arena (11,595); Boise, ID
February 24, 2024; 7:00 p.m., CBSSN		No. 19 San Diego State	L 41–73	11–16 (4–10)	12 – Hill	8 – Colimerio	2 – Weaver	Save Mart Center (6,452); Fresno, CA
February 27, 2024; 7:00 p.m., MW Network		No. 22 Utah State	L 73–77 ^{OT}	11–17 (4–11)	21 – Hill	8 – Colimerio	3 – Tied	Save Mart Center (3,785); Fresno, CA
March 1, 2024; 7:30 p.m., CBSSN		at Nevada	L 66–74	11–18 (4–12)	16 – Tied	5 – Tied	4 – Hill	Lawlor Events Center (9,753); Reno, NV
March 6, 2024; 7:30 p.m., FS1		at New Mexico	L 58–79	11–19 (4–13)	20 – DuSell	6 – Tied	3 – Tied	The Pit (13,140); Albuquerque, NM
March 9, 2024; 4:00 p.m., MW Network		Wyoming	L 47-86	11–20 (4–14)	12 – Weaver	6 – Pope	7 – Hill	Save Mart Center (4,395); Fresno, CA
Mountain West tournament
March 13, 2024; 11:00 a.m., MW Network	(9)	vs. (8) Wyoming; First round	W 77–73	12–20	22 – Pope	7 – Boakye	4 – Hill	Thomas & Mack Center; Paradise, NV
March 14, 2024; 12:00 p.m., CBSSN	(9)	vs. (1) No. 18 Utah State; Quarterfinals	L 75–87 ^{OT}	12–21	19 – Weaver	10 – Hill	7 – Hill	Thomas & Mack Center; Paradise, NV
*Non-conference game. ^{#}Rankings from AP Poll. (#) Tournament seedings in parentheses. All times are in Pacific Time.
