= List of UNLV Runnin' Rebels basketball seasons =

This is a list of seasons completed by the UNLV Runnin' Rebels men's college basketball team.

== Seasons ==
Statistics overview
Season	Coach	Overall	Conference	Standing	Postseason
Michael Drakulich (Independent) (1958–1963)
1958–59	Michael Drakulich	5–13			
1959–60	Michael Drakulich	13–8			
1960–61	Michael Drakulich	13–12			
1961–62	Michael Drakulich	16–8			
1962–63	Michael Drakulich	21–4			
Ed Gregory (Independent) (1963–1965)
1963–64	Ed Gregory	19–7			
1964–65	Ed Gregory	21–8			NCAA College Division first round
Rolland Todd (Independent) (1965–1969)
1965–66	Rolland Todd	15–11			
1966–67	Rolland Todd	21–6			NCAA College Division Sweet Sixteen
1967–68	Rolland Todd	22–7			NCAA College Division Elite Eight
1968–69	Rolland Todd	21–7			NCAA College Division Sweet Sixteen
Rolland Todd (West Coast Athletic Conference) (1969–1970)
1969–70	Rolland Todd	17–9	9–5	T–3rd	
John Bayer (West Coast Athletic Conference) (1970–1973)
1970–71	John Bayer	16–10	9–5	3rd	
1971–72	John Bayer	14–12	8–6	4th	
1972–73	John Bayer	13–15	6–8	T–5th	
Jerry Tarkanian (West Coast Athletic Conference) (1973–1975)
1973–74	Jerry Tarkanian	20–6	10–4	3rd	
1974–75	Jerry Tarkanian	24–5	13–1	1st	NCAA Division I second round
Jerry Tarkanian (Independent) (1975–1982)
1975–76	Jerry Tarkanian	29–2			NCAA Division I second round
1976–77	Jerry Tarkanian	29–3			NCAA Division I Final Four
1977–78	Jerry Tarkanian	20–8			
1978–79	Jerry Tarkanian	21–8			
1979–80	Jerry Tarkanian	23–9			NIT Fourth Place
1980–81	Jerry Tarkanian	16–12			
1981–82	Jerry Tarkanian	20–10			NIT second round
Jerry Tarkanian (Pacific Coast Athletic Association / Big West Conference) (1982–1992)
1982–83	Jerry Tarkanian	28–3	15–1	1st	NCAA Division I second round
1983–84	Jerry Tarkanian	29–6	16–2	1st	NCAA Division I Sweet Sixteen
1984–85	Jerry Tarkanian	28–4	17–1	1st	NCAA Division I second round
1985–86	Jerry Tarkanian	33–5	16–2	1st	NCAA Division I Sweet Sixteen
1986–87	Jerry Tarkanian	37–2	18–0	1st	NCAA Division I Final Four
1987–88	Jerry Tarkanian	28–6	15–3	1st	NCAA Division I second round
1988–89	Jerry Tarkanian	29–8	16–2	1st	NCAA Division I Elite Eight
1989–90	Jerry Tarkanian	35–5	16–2	T–1st	NCAA Division I Champion
1990–91	Jerry Tarkanian	34–1	18–0	1st	NCAA Division I Final Four
1991–92	Jerry Tarkanian	26–2	18–0	1st	Ineligible
Rollie Massimino (Big West Conference) (1992–1994)
1992–93	Rollie Massimino	21–8	13–5	2nd	NIT first round
1993–94	Rollie Massimino	15–13	10–8	T–5th	
Tim Grgurich (Big West Conference) (1994–1995)
1994–95	Tim Grgurich; Howie Landa; Cleveland Edwards	12–16^{[Note A]}	7–11^{[Note A]}	7th	
Bill Bayno (Big West Conference) (1995–1996)
1995–96	Bill Bayno	10–16	7–11	9th	
Bill Bayno (Western Athletic Conference) (1996–1999)
1996–97	Bill Bayno	22–10	11–5	3rd (Pacific)	NIT Quarterfinal
1997–98	Bill Bayno	20–13	7–7	5th (Mountain)	NCAA Division I first round
1998–99	Bill Bayno	16–13	9–5	1st (Mountain)	NIT first round
Bill Bayno (Mountain West Conference) (1999–2001)
1999–00	Bill Bayno	23–8	10–4	T–1st	NCAA Division I first round
2000–01	Bill Bayno; Max Good	16–13^{[Note B]}	7–7^{[Note B]}	4th	
Charlie Spoonhour (Mountain West Conference) (2001–2004)
2001–02	Charlie Spoonhour	21–11	9–5	3rd	NIT second round
2002–03	Charlie Spoonhour	21–11	8–6	T–3rd	NIT first round
2003–04	Charlie Spoonhour; Jay Spoonhour	18–13^{[Note C]}	8–8^{[Note C]}	4th	NIT Opening Round
Lon Kruger (Mountain West Conference) (2004–2011)
2004–05	Lon Kruger	17–14	7–7	4th	NIT second round
2005–06	Lon Kruger	17–13	10–6	4th	
2006–07	Lon Kruger	30–7	12–4	2nd	NCAA Division I Sweet Sixteen
2007–08	Lon Kruger	27–8	12–4	2nd	NCAA Division I second round
2008–09	Lon Kruger	21–11	9–7	5th	NIT first round
2009–10	Lon Kruger	25–9	11–5	T–3rd	NCAA Division I first round
2010–11	Lon Kruger	24–9	11–5	3rd	NCAA Division I first round
Dave Rice (Mountain West Conference) (2011–2016)
2011–12	Dave Rice	26–9	9–5	3rd	NCAA Division I first round
2012–13	Dave Rice	25–10	10–6	3rd	NCAA Division I second round
2013–14	Dave Rice	20–13	10–8	T–3rd	
2014–15	Dave Rice	18–15	8–10	7th	
2015–16	Dave Rice; Todd Simon	18–15^{[Note D]}	8–10^{[Note D]}	T–6th	
Marvin Menzies (Mountain West Conference) (2016–2019)
2016–17	Marvin Menzies	11–21	4–14	11th	
2017–18	Marvin Menzies	20–13	8–10	T–7th	
2018–19	Marvin Menzies	17–14	11–7	T–4th	
T. J. Otzelberger (Mountain West Conference) (2019–2021)
2019–20	T. J. Otzelberger	17–15	12–6	T–2nd	No postseason held
2020–21	T. J. Otzelberger	12–15	8–10	7th	
Kevin Kruger (Mountain West) (2021–2025)
2021–22	Kevin Kruger	18–14	10–8	5th	
2022–23	Kevin Kruger	19–13	7–11	7th	
2023–24	Kevin Kruger	21–13	12–6	4th	NIT quarterfinals
2024–25	Kevin Kruger	17–14	11–9	6th	
Josh Pastner (Mountain West) (2025–present)
2025–26	Josh Pastner	18–17	11–9	T–7th	NIT second round
Total:		–			
National champion Postseason invitational champion Conference regular season champion Conference regular season and conference tournament champion Division regular season champion Division regular season and conference tournament champion Conference tournament champion

^A. Grgurich resigned after going 2–5, 0–2 in conference. Edwards went 5–9 and Landa went 5–2.
^B. Bayno went 3–4, while Good went 13–9 and 7–7 in conference.
^C. Charlie Spoonhour went 12–9 and 4–6 in conference. Jay Spoonhour went 6–4 and 4–2 in conference.
^D. Rice went 9–7 and 0–3 in conference. Simon went 9–8 and 8–7 in conference.
