= Heath Schroyer =

American college basketball coach (born 1972)

Current position
- Title: Senior Deputy Athletic Director
- Team: LSU
- Conference: SEC

Biographical details
- Born: March 15, 1972 (age 54); Walkersville, Maryland, U.S.

Playing career
- 1991–1993: Kings River CC
- 1993–1995: Armstrong Atlantic State

Coaching career (HC unless noted)
- 1996–1997: Fresno CC (assistant)
- 1997–2001: BYU (assistant)
- 2001–2002: Wyoming (assistant)
- 2002–2005: Portland State
- 2005–2007: Fresno State (assistant)
- 2007–2011: Wyoming
- 2011–2014: UNLV (assistant)
- 2014–2016: UT Martin
- 2016–2017: NC State (asst. HC)
- 2017–2018: BYU (assistant)
- 2018–2021: McNeese

Administrative career (AD unless noted)
- 2021–2025: McNeese
- 2026-Present: LSU

Head coaching record
- Overall: 149–182
- Tournaments: CBI: 0–1; CIT: 4–2

Accomplishments and honors

Championships
- Big Sky regular season (2002); OVC West division (2016)

Heath Martin Schroyer (born March 15, 1972) is currently serving as the Senior Deputy Athletic Director at Louisiana State University. Prior to becoming the AD, Schroyer spent 25 years as a Division 1 men’s basketball coach, including stops at BYU, Wyoming, Portland State, Fresno State, UNLV, UT Martin and NC State.

== Playing career ==
Schroyer was born and raised in Walkersville, Maryland where his family owned a dairy farm. He played high school basketball under head coach Morgan Wootten at DeMatha Catholic High School and went on to win All-Conference awards at Kings River Community College before playing at Armstrong Atlantic State University, where he graduated with a bachelor’s in liberal studies. He holds a master’s degree in instructional leadership from National University.

== Coaching career ==
Schroyer's coaching career began following graduation when he was an assistant for one year at Reedley College in California, then served as an assistant under Steve Cleveland at Fresno City College. When Cleveland became the coach at Brigham Young University in 1997, Schroyer followed him and spent the next four seasons as an assistant coach there. He became an assistant at the University of Wyoming for the 2001–02 season before being hired as the head coach at Portland State University.

At the time of his hiring, Schroyer was the second-youngest coach in Division I, and his first team at Portland State won just five games. In his third and final season at the school, Schroyer led the Vikings to a 19–9 record, including an 11–3 conference record and a Big Sky Conference championship. Following the season, Schroyer rejoined Cleveland as the associate head coach at Fresno State University.

On February 8, 2011, Schroyer was fired from his head coaching job at the University of Wyoming after starting 8–15 and 1–8 in Mountain West Conference play and a 49–68 record in four years. In May 2011, newly appointed UNLV Runnin' Rebels basketball coach Dave Rice announced that he had signed Schroyer on as an assistant and recruiting coordinator.

Schroyer returned to head coaching when he accepted the position at the University of Tennessee at Martin on March 20, 2014. He stayed with the Skyhawks for two seasons, amassing a 41-28 record before leaving to take an assistant coaching position at North Carolina State under Mark Gottfried. The following season, Schroyer returned to BYU for his second stint as an assistant coach, joining Dave Rose's staff.

On March 15, 2018, Schroyer was named the head men's basketball coach at McNeese State, replacing Dave Simmons. He stepped down in 2021 to become athletic director.

== Head coaching record ==
Record table
Season	Team	Overall	Conference	Standing	Postseason
Portland State Vikings (Big Sky Conference) (2002–2005)
2002–03	Portland State	5–22	3–11	8th	
2003–04	Portland State	11–16	5–9	8th	
2004–05	Portland State	19–9	11–3	1st	
Portland State:		35–47 (.427)	19–23 (.452)		
Wyoming Cowboys (Mountain West Conference) (2007–2011)
2007–08	Wyoming	12–18	5–11	8th	
2008–09	Wyoming	19–14	7–9	6th	CBI First Round
2009–10	Wyoming	10–21	3–13	8th	
2010–11	Wyoming	8–15	1–8	(fired)	
Wyoming:		49–68 (.419)	16–41 (.281)		
UT Martin Skyhawks (Ohio Valley Conference) (2014–2016)
2014–15	UT Martin	21–13	10–6	2nd (West)	CIT Semifinals
2015–16	UT Martin	20–15	10–6	T–1st (West)	CIT Second Round
Tennessee Martin:		41–28 (.594)	20–12 (.625)		
McNeese State Cowboys (Southland Conference) (2018–2021)
2018–19	McNeese State	9–22	5–13	12th	
2019–20	McNeese State	15–17	10–10	T–6th	
2020–21	McNeese State	10–14	4–10	9th	
McNeese State:		34–53 (.391)	19–33 (.365)		
Total:		158–196 (.446)			
National champion Postseason invitational champion Conference regular season champion Conference regular season and conference tournament champion Division regular season champion Division regular season and conference tournament champion Conference tournament champion
