= 2007–08 Wyoming Cowboys basketball team =

American college basketball season

2007–08 Wyoming Cowboys basketball
- Conference: Mountain West Conference
- Record: 12–18 (5–11 MWC)
- Head coach: Heath Schroyer
- Assistant coaches: Fred Langley; Shaun Vandiver; Anthony Stewart
- Home arena: Arena-Auditorium

2007–08 Mountain West Conference men's basketball standings
	Conf.				Overall
Team	W		L	PCT	W		L	PCT
BYU	14	–	2	.875	27	–	8	.771
UNLV †	12	–	4	.750	27	–	8	.771
New Mexico	11	–	5	.688	24	–	9	.727
San Diego State	9	–	7	.563	20	–	13	.606
Air Force	8	–	8	.500	16	–	14	.533
Utah	7	–	9	.438	18	–	15	.545
TCU	6	–	10	.375	14	–	16	.467
Wyoming	5	–	11	.313	12	–	18	.400
Colorado State	0	–	16	.000	7	–	25	.219
† 2008 Mountain West tournament winner Rankings from AP Poll

The 2007–08 Wyoming Cowboys basketball team represented the University of Wyoming during the 2007–08 NCAA Division I men's basketball season. The Cowboys, led by first year head coach Heath Schroyer, played their home games at the Arena-Auditorium as members of the Mountain West Conference.

== Roster ==
Number	Name	Position	Height	Weight	Class	Hometown
0	Sean Ogirri	G	6–2	200	Senior*	Denver, Colorado
1	Brad Jones	G	6–0	170	Senior	Marked Tree, Arkansas
5	Ryan Dermody	F	6–8	205	Sophomore	Loveland, Colorado
11	Afam Muojeke	G/F	6–7	198	Freshman	Jamaica, New York
12	Byron Geis	G	6–3	195	Senior	Gillette, Wyoming
13	Mikhail Linskens	C	7–0	270	Freshman	West Flanders, Belgium
15	Adam Waddell	F/C	6–9	215	Freshman	Cody, Wyoming
20	Joseph Taylor	F	6–8	210	Senior	Los Angeles, California
21	Tyson Johnson	F	6–6	235	Junior	Long Island, New York
23	Brandon Ewing	G	6–2	190	Junior	Chicago, Illinois
24	Marios Matalon	G	6–1	185	Freshman	Thessaloniki, Greece
31	Eric Platt	G-F	6–5	205	Sophomore	Casper, Wyoming
32	Travis Nelson	C	6–11	235	Sophomore	Marion, Iowa
45	Bienvenu Songondo	F	6–10	220	Senior	Bangui, Central African Republic
55	Travis Bunker	G/F	6–5	200	Junior	Beaver, Utah

- Ogirri sat out the 2007–08 season per NCAA transfer rules

== Schedule and results ==
Date	Opponent	Place	W/L	Result	Record	MWC
Nov. 10	Colorado-Colorado Springs	Laramie, Wyoming	Win	87–63	1–0	
Nov. 13	Denver	Denver, Colorado	Loss	65–76	1–1	
Nov. 19	Lamar	Beaumont, Texas	Win	75–71	2–1	
Nov. 24	Wichita State	Wichita, Kansas	Loss	63–75	2–2	
Nov. 26	Arkansas-Pine Bluff	Laramie, Wyoming	Win	78–59	3–2	
Dec. 1	Akron	Akron, Ohio	Loss	71–96	3–3	
Dec. 8	Colorado	Laramie, Wyoming	Win	73–64	4–3	
Dec. 15	Montana State	Casper, Wyoming	Loss	72–79	4–4	
Dec. 21	Buffalo	El Paso, Texas	Win	66–63	5–4	
Dec. 22	UTEP	El Paso, Texas	Loss	73–79	5–5	
Dec. 29	Wisconsin–Milwaukee	Laramie, Wyoming	Loss	66–80	5–6	
Dec. 31	Chadron State College	Laramie, Wyoming	Win	76–69	6–6	
Jan. 5	New Mexico	Laramie, Wyoming	Loss	92–99	6–7	0–1
Jan. 12	TCU	Fort Worth, Texas	Loss	56–83	6–8	0–2
Jan. 16	Air Force	Laramie, Wyoming	Loss	62–64	6–9	0–3
Jan. 19	San Diego State	San Diego, California	Loss	43–70	6–10	0–4
Jan. 23	UNLV	Las Vegas, Nevada	Loss	71–78	6–11	0–5
Jan. 26	Colorado State	Laramie, Wyoming	Win	73–58	7–11	1–5
Jan. 30	Utah	Salt Lake City, Utah	Win	69–64	8–11	2–5
Feb. 2	BYU	Laramie, Wyoming	Loss	63–73	8–12	2–6
Feb. 6	Cal State Bakersfield	Laramie, Wyoming	Win	78–53	9–12	2–6
Feb. 9	New Mexico	Albuquerque, New Mexico	Loss	55–100	9–13	2–7
Feb. 13	TCU	Laramie, Wyoming	Win	72–54	10–13	3–7
Feb. 16	Air Force	Colorado Springs, Colorado	Loss	66–72	10–14	3–8
Feb. 19	San Diego State	Laramie, Wyoming	Loss	68–79	10–15	3–9
Feb. 23	UNLV	Laramie, Wyoming	Loss	65–73	10–16	3–10
Feb. 27	Colorado State	Fort Collins, Colorado	Win	77–67	11–16	4–10
Mar. 1	Utah	Laramie, Wyoming	Win	72–64	12–16	5–10
Mar. 5	BYU	Provo, Utah	Loss	61–78	12–17	5–11
2008 Mountain West Conference men's basketball tournament
Mar. 12	Colorado State	Las Vegas, Nevada	Loss	63–68	12–18	5–11
