= 2007–08 BYU Cougars men's basketball team =

American college basketball season

2007–08 BYU Cougars men's basketball

MWC Regular season champions

NCAA tournament, First round
- Conference: Mountain West Conference
- Record: 27–8 (14–2 Mountain West)
- Head coach: Dave Rose
- Home arena: Marriott Center

2007–08 Mountain West Conference men's basketball standings
	Conf.				Overall
Team	W		L	PCT	W		L	PCT
BYU	14	–	2	.875	27	–	8	.771
UNLV †	12	–	4	.750	27	–	8	.771
New Mexico	11	–	5	.688	24	–	9	.727
San Diego State	9	–	7	.563	20	–	13	.606
Air Force	8	–	8	.500	16	–	14	.533
Utah	7	–	9	.438	18	–	15	.545
TCU	6	–	10	.375	14	–	16	.467
Wyoming	5	–	11	.313	12	–	18	.400
Colorado State	0	–	16	.000	7	–	25	.219
† 2008 Mountain West tournament winner Rankings from AP Poll

The 2007–08 BYU Cougars men's basketball team represented Brigham Young University in the 2007–08 college basketball season. This was head coach Dave Rose's third season at BYU. The Cougars competed in the Mountain West Conference and played their home games at the Marriott Center.

== Roster ==
#	Name	Height	Weight (lbs.)	Position	Hometown	Previous Team(s)			
2	Lamont Morgan Jr.	5'10"	170	G	Pomona, California	(California)	United States	(United States)	Diamond Ranch HS; Saddleback CC
5	Archie Rose	6'5"	210	G	Nassau		Bahamas	(The Bahamas)	Lee College
10	Vuk Ivanovic	6'10"	250	F C	Pančevo		Serbia	(Serbia)	Seton Hill
10	Michael Loyd Jr.	6'1"	170	G	Las Vegas, Nevada	(Nevada)	United States	(United States)	Palo Verde HS
14	Nick Martineau	6'0"	170	G	Fruit Heights, Utah	(Utah)	United States	(United States)	Davis HS
15	James Anderson	6'10"	240	F C	Page, Arizona	(Arizona)	United States	(United States)	Page HS
20	Sam Burgess	6'3"	190	G	Alpine, Utah	(Utah)	United States	(United States)	Snow College
20	Matt Pinegar	6'0"	190	G	Provo, Utah	(Utah)	United States	(United States)	Timpview HS
24	Ben Murdock	6'2"	185B	G	Bountiful, Utah	(Utah)	United States	(United States)	Dixie State College
30	Lee Cummard	6'7"	190	G	Mesa, Arizona	(Arizona)	United States	(United States)	Mesa HS
32	Jimmer Fredette	6'2"	195	G	Glens Falls, New York	(New York (state))	United States	(United States)	Glens Falls HS
41	Chris Collinsworth	6'9"	235	F	Provo, Utah	(Utah)	United States	(United States)	Provo HS
44	Trent Plaisted	6'11"	245	F C	San Antonio, Texas	(Texas)	United States	(United States)	Clark HS
45	Jonathan Tavernari	6'6"	215	G F	São Bernardo do Campo	(São Paulo (state))	Brazil	(Brazil)	Bishop Gorman HS
53	Gavin MacGregor	6'10"	240	F C	Ridgecrest, California	(California)	United States	(United States)	Burroughs HS
54	Chris Miles	6'11"	235	F C	Provo, Utah	(Utah)	United States	(United States)	Timpview HS

== Rankings ==
Ranking movements Legend: ██ Increase in ranking ██ Decrease in ranking — = Not ranked RV = Received votes
	Week																				
Poll	Pre	1	2	3	4	5	6	7	8	9	10	11	12	13	14	15	16	17	18	19	Final
AP	RV	RV	RV	21	20	25	21	20	RV	RV	—	—	—	RV	RV	RV	RV	RV	24	RV	Not released
Coaches	RV	RV	RV	23	22	25	23	21	RV	RV	RV	—	RV	RV	RV	RV	25	24	23	RV	RV

*AP does not release post-NCAA Tournament rankings.
