= 2006–07 UNLV Runnin' Rebels basketball team =

American college basketball season

2006–07 UNLV Runnin' Rebels basketball

MWC tournament champions

NCAA tournament, Sweet Sixteen
- Conference: Mountain West Conference

Ranking
- Coaches: No. 14
- AP: No. 19
- Record: 30–7 (12–4 Mountain West)
- Head coach: Lon Kruger
- Assistant coaches: Greg Grensing; Steve Henson; Lew Hill
- Home arena: Thomas & Mack Center

2006–07 Mountain West Conference men's basketball standings
	Conf.				Overall
Team	W		L	PCT	W		L	PCT
No. 24 BYU	13	–	3	.813	25	–	9	.735
No. 19 UNLV †	12	–	4	.750	30	–	7	.811
San Diego State	10	–	6	.625	22	–	11	.667
Air Force	10	–	6	.625	26	–	9	.743
Wyoming	7	–	9	.438	17	–	15	.531
Colorado State	6	–	10	.375	17	–	13	.567
Utah	6	–	10	.375	11	–	19	.367
TCU	4	–	12	.250	13	–	17	.433
New Mexico	4	–	12	.250	15	–	17	.469
† 2007 Mountain West tournament winner Rankings from AP Poll

The 2006–07 UNLV Runnin' Rebels basketball team represented the University of Nevada, Las Vegas. The team was coached by Lon Kruger, returning for his third year with the Runnin' Rebels. They played their home games at the Thomas & Mack Center on UNLV's main campus in Paradise, Nevada and were a member of the Mountain West Conference. The Runnin' Rebels finished the season 30–7, 12–4 in MWC play. They won the 2007 Mountain West Conference men's basketball tournament to receive an automatic bid to the 2007 NCAA Division I men's basketball tournament, earning a 7 seed in the Midwest Region. The Runnin' Rebels defeated 10 seed Georgia Tech in the opening round and 2 seed Wisconsin to reach the Sweet Sixteen before losing to 3 seed Oregon in the regional semifinals.

== Roster ==
2006–07 UNLV Rebels men's basketball team
Players
Coaches

Pos.	#	Name	Height	Weight	Year	Previous school	Hometown
G	1	Wink Adams	6 ft 0 in (1.83 m)	195 lb (88 kg)	So	Gulf Shores Academy	Houston, Texas
G	2	Kevin Kruger	6 ft 2 in (1.88 m)	185 lb (84 kg)	Sr	Arizona State	Marietta, Georgia
G	24	René Rougeau	6 ft 6 in (1.98 m)	200 lb (91 kg)	So	Etiwanda	Rancho Cucamonga, California
G	33	Tre'Von Willis	6 ft 4 in (1.93 m)	—	Fr		Fresno, California
F	45	Joe Darger	6 ft 7 in (2.01 m)	225 lb (102 kg)	So	Riverton	Riverton, Utah

Head coach

- Lon Kruger

Assistant coach(es)

- Greg Grensing
- Steve Henson
- Lew Hill

Legend

- (C) Team captain
- (S) Suspended
- (I) Ineligible
- (W) Walk-on
- Injured
- Current redshirt

Roster

== Schedule and results ==
Date time, TV	Rank^{#}	Opponent^{#}	Result	Record	Site (attendance) city, state
Exhibition
Nov 7, 2006*; 7:30 p.m.		Dixie State	W 70–37		Thomas & Mack Center (9,534); Paradise, Nevada
Non-conference regular season
Nov 10, 2006*; 7:00 p.m.		Hawaii	W 73–59	1–0	Thomas & Mack Center (9,284); Paradise, Nevada
Nov 14, 2006*; 7:30 p.m.		Eastern Washington	W 82–79	2–0	Thomas & Mack Center (7,236); Paradise, Nevada
Nov 17, 2006*; 7:30 p.m.		UC Santa Barbara	L 76–79	2–1	Thomas & Mack Center (8,525); Paradise, Nevada
Nov 21, 2006; 7:30 p.m.		Washburn	W 83–55	3–1	Thomas & Mack Center (6,838); Paradise, Nevada
Nov 25, 2006*; 7:30 p.m.		San Francisco	W 96–88	4–1	Thomas & Mack Center (8,096); Paradise, Nevada
Nov 28, 2006*; 7:30 p.m.		at No. 16 Arizona	L 75–89	4–2	McKale Center (13,180); Tucson, Arizona
Dec 2, 2006*; 3:00 p.m.		vs. Northern Arizona	W 93–53	5–2	Burns Arena (1,274)
Dec 5, 2006*; 9:00 p.m.		at Hawaii	W 61–58	6–2	Stan Sheriff Center (6,200); Honolulu, Hawaii
Dec 9, 2006*; 8:00 p.m.		at No. 20 Nevada	W 58–49	7–2	Lawlor Events Center (11,368); Reno, Nevada
Dec 17, 2006*; 7:30 p.m.		Texas A&M–Corpus Christi	W 67–57	8–2	Thomas & Mack Center (8,041); Paradise, Nevada
Dec 18, 2006*; 7:30 p.m.		Norfolk State	W 103–56	9–2	Thomas & Mack Center (7,536); Paradise, Nevada
Dec 19, 2006*; 7:30 p.m.		South Florida	W 74–59	10–2	Thomas & Mack Center (8,812); Paradise, Nevada
Dec 22, 2006*; 7:00 p.m.		Minnesota	W 62–58	11–2	Thomas & Mack Center (11,359); Paradise, Nevada
Dec 28, 2006*; 6:00 p.m.		at Texas Tech	W 74–66	12–2	United Spirit Arena (15,098); Lubbock, Texas
Dec 30, 2006*; 5:00 p.m.		at Houston	W 78–62	13–2	Hofheinz Pavilion (4,056); Houston, Texas
MWC regular season
Jan 3, 2007; 8:00 p.m.		Utah	W 97–94 ^{2OT}	14–2 (1–0)	Thomas & Mack Center (12,369); Paradise, Nevada
Jan 6, 2007; 12:30 p.m.		at No. 20 Air Force	L 50–56	14–3 (1–1)	Clune Arena (5,908); Colorado Springs, Colorado
Jan 10, 2007; 7:00 p.m.		at Wyoming	L 76–86 ^{OT}	14–4 (1–2)	Arena-Auditorium (6,760); Laramie, Wyoming
Jan 13, 2007; 7:00 p.m.		BYU	W 83–75	15–4 (2–2)	Thomas & Mack Center (12,946); Paradise, Nevada
Jan 20, 2007; 5:00 p.m.		at TCU	W 75–66	16–4 (3–2)	Daniel-Meyer Coliseum (4,175); Fort Worth, Texas
Jan 23, 2007; 7:00 p.m.		San Diego State	W 68–61	17–4 (4–2)	Thomas & Mack Center (10,881); Paradise, Nevada
Jan 27, 2007; 7:00 p.m.		New Mexico	W 76–72 ^{OT}	18–4 (5–2)	Thomas & Mack Center (17,056); Paradise, Nevada
Jan 30, 2007; 6:00 p.m.		at Colorado State	W 76–59	19–4 (6–2)	Moby Arena (5,124); Fort Collins, Colorado
Feb 3, 2007; 2:30 p.m.		at BYU	L 63–90	19–5 (6–3)	Marriott Center (15,899); Provo, Utah
Feb 7, 2007; 7:00 p.m.		TCU	W 82–67	20–5 (7–3)	Thomas & Mack Center (10,097); Paradise, Nevada
Feb 10, 2007; 7:00 p.m.		Wyoming	W 80–70	21–5 (8–3)	Thomas & Mack Center (13,217); Paradise, Nevada
Feb 13, 2007; 8:00 p.m.		at San Diego State	L 52–67	21–6 (8–4)	Viejas Arena (9,006); San Diego, California
Feb 17, 2007; 3:00 p.m.		at Utah	W 70–57	22–6 (9–4)	Jon M. Huntsman Center (8,394); Salt Lake City, Utah
Feb 20, 2007; 7:00 p.m.		No. 14 Air Force	W 60–50	23–6 (10–4)	Thomas & Mack Center (15,692); Paradise, Nevada
Feb 28, 2007; 7:00 p.m.		at New Mexico	W 85–83	24–6 (11–4)	The Pit (13,211); Albuquerque, New Mexico
Mar 3, 2007; 6:00 p.m.		Colorado State	W 65–47	25–6 (12–4)	Thomas & Mack Center (18,069); Paradise, Nevada
MWC tournament
Mar 8, 2007*; 6:00 p.m.	(2) No. 25	(7) Utah; Quarterfinals	W 80–54	26–6	Thomas & Mack Center (10,925); Paradise, Nevada
Mar 9, 2007*; 8:30 p.m.	(2) No. 25	(6) Colorado State; Semifinals	W 88–72	27–6	Thomas & Mack Center (13,891); Paradise, Nevada
Mar 10, 2007*; 4:00 p.m.	(2) No. 25	(1) No. 23 BYU; Championship	W 78–70	28–6	Thomas & Mack Center (16,204); Paradise, Nevada
NCAA tournament
Mar 16, 2007*; 9:25 a.m.	(7 MW) No. 19	vs. (10 MW) Georgia Tech; First round	W 67–63	29–6	United Center (18,237); Chicago, Illinois
Mar 18, 2007*; 11:30 a.m.	(7 MW) No. 19	vs. (2 MW) No. 6 Wisconsin; Second Round	W 74–68	30–6	United Center (20,916); Chicago, Illinois
Mar 23, 2007*; 6:40 p.m.	(7 MW) No. 19	vs. (3 MW) No. 10 Oregon; Midwest Regional semifinal – Sweet Sixteen	L 72–76	30–7	Edward Jones Dome (26,307); St. Louis, Missouri
*Non-conference game. ^{#}Rankings from AP poll/Coaches' Poll. (#) Tournament seedings in parentheses. MW=Midwest. All times are in Pacific Time.
