= 2007 Mountain West Conference men's basketball tournament =

- Classification: Division I
- Season: 2006–07
- Teams: 9
- Site: Thomas & Mack Center; Paradise, Nevada
- Champions: UNLV (2nd title)
- MVP: Kevin Kruger (UNLV)
- Television: MountainWest Sports Network

2006–07 Mountain West Conference men's basketball standings
	Conf.				Overall
Team	W		L	PCT	W		L	PCT
No. 24 BYU	13	–	3	.813	25	–	9	.735
No. 19 UNLV †	12	–	4	.750	30	–	7	.811
San Diego State	10	–	6	.625	22	–	11	.667
Air Force	10	–	6	.625	26	–	9	.743
Wyoming	7	–	9	.438	17	–	15	.531
Colorado State	6	–	10	.375	17	–	13	.567
Utah	6	–	10	.375	11	–	19	.367
TCU	4	–	12	.250	13	–	17	.433
New Mexico	4	–	12	.250	15	–	17	.469
† 2007 Mountain West tournament winner Rankings from AP Poll

The 2007 Mountain West Conference men's basketball tournament was played at the Thomas & Mack Center in Las Vegas, Nevada from March 8–10, 2007. Tournament host UNLV upset regular season league champion BYU 78–70 to claim the Mountain West Conference tournament title and the league's automatic bid to the NCAA Tournament. It was UNLV's first tournament title since winning the inaugural tournament in 2000 (though they had previously lost 3 consecutive championship games from 2002 to 2004).

2007 marked the return of the tournament to the Thomas & Mack Center after a three-year stint in Denver.

== Tournament Bracket ==
First round
8	Texas Christian	62
9	New Mexico	54

Quarterfinals
1	#23 BYU	77
8	TCU	64
4	Air Force	62
5	Wyoming	67
2	#25 UNLV	80
7	Utah	54
3	San Diego State	64
6	Colorado State	69

Semifinals
1	#23 BYU	96
5	Wyoming	84
2	#25 UNLV	88
6	Colorado St.	72

Championship
1	#23 BYU	70
2	#25 UNLV	78
