= 2006–07 BYU Cougars men's basketball team =

American college basketball season

2006–07 BYU Cougars men's basketball

MWC Regular season champions

NCAA tournament, First round
- Conference: Mountain West Conference

Ranking
- AP: No. 24
- Record: 25–9 (13–3 Mountain West)
- Head coach: Dave Rose (2nd season)
- Home arena: Marriott Center

2006–07 Mountain West Conference men's basketball standings
| | Conf. | | | | Overall |
| Team | W | | L | PCT | W | | L | PCT |
|---|---|---|---|---|---|---|---|---|
| No. 24 BYU | 13 | – | 3 | .813 | 25 | – | 9 | .735 |
| No. 19 UNLV † | 12 | – | 4 | .750 | 30 | – | 7 | .811 |
| San Diego State | 10 | – | 6 | .625 | 22 | – | 11 | .667 |
| Air Force | 10 | – | 6 | .625 | 26 | – | 9 | .743 |
| Wyoming | 7 | – | 9 | .438 | 17 | – | 15 | .531 |
| Colorado State | 6 | – | 10 | .375 | 17 | – | 13 | .567 |
| Utah | 6 | – | 10 | .375 | 11 | – | 19 | .367 |
| TCU | 4 | – | 12 | .250 | 13 | – | 17 | .433 |
| New Mexico | 4 | – | 12 | .250 | 15 | – | 17 | .469 |
† 2007 Mountain West tournament winner Rankings from AP Poll

The 2006–07 BYU Cougars men's basketball team represented Brigham Young University in the 2006–07 college basketball season. This was head coach Dave Rose's second season at BYU. The Cougars competed in the Mountain West Conference and played their home games at the Marriott Center.

== Roster ==
2006–07 BYU Cougars men's basketball team
Players
Coaches

| Pos. | # | Name | Height | Weight | Year | Hometown |
|---|---|---|---|---|---|---|
| G | 2 | Mike Rose | 6 ft 3 in (1.91 m) | 185 lb (84 kg) | Sr | Houston, Texas |
| F | 3 | Keena Young | 6 ft 6 in (1.98 m) | 215 lb (98 kg) | Sr | Beaumont, Texas |
| G | 13 | Austin Ainge | 6 ft 2 in (1.88 m) | 180 lb (82 kg) | Sr | Gilbert, Arizona |
| G | 23 | Jimmy Balderson | 6 ft 6 in (1.98 m) | 205 lb (93 kg) | Sr |
| G | 30 | Lee Cummard | 6 ft 7 in (2.01 m) | 190 lb (86 kg) | So | Mesa, Arizona |
| F | 44 | Trent Plaisted | 6 ft 11 in (2.11 m) | 245 lb (111 kg) | So | San Antonio, Texas |
| F | 45 | Jonathan Tavernari | 6 ft 6 in (1.98 m) | 215 lb (98 kg) | Fr | São Bernardo do Campo, Brazil |

Head coach

- Dave Rose

Assistant coach(es)

Legend

- (C) Team captain
- (S) Suspended
- (I) Ineligible
- (W) Walk-on
- Injured
- Current redshirt

== Schedule and results ==
| Date time, TV | Rank^{#} | Opponent^{#} | Result | Record | Site city, state |
Exhibition
| Nov 2, 2006*; 7:00 p.m. | | Brock University | W 90–49 | | Marriott Center; Provo, Utah |
| Nov 8, 2006*; 7:00 p.m. | | Montevallo | W 92–63 | | Marriott Center; Provo, Utah |
Non-conference regular season
| Nov 15, 2006*; 7:30 p.m., FSN PT | | at No. 6 UCLA | L 69–82 | 0–1 | Pauley Pavilion; Los Angeles, California |
| Nov 18, 2006*; 7:30 p.m. | | Idaho State | W 84–78 ^{OT} | 1–1 | Marriott Center; Provo, Utah |
| Nov 22, 2006*; 7:30 p.m. | | Portland | W 79–50 | 2–1 | Marriott Center; Provo, Utah |
| Nov 24, 2006*; 8:00 p.m., The Mtn. | | Southern Utah | W 80–61 | 3–1 | Marriott Center; Provo, Utah |
| Nov 29, 2006*; 7:00 p.m., KTVB | | at Boise State | L 68–72 | 3–2 | Taco Bell Arena; Boise, Idaho |
| Dec 2, 2006*; 7:00 p.m., KJZZ | | at Weber State | W 73–69 ^{OT} | 4–2 | Dee Events Center; Ogden, Utah |
| Dec 6, 2006*; 7:00 p.m., The Mtn. | | San Jose State | W 81–69 | 5–2 | Marriott Center (7,729); Provo, Utah |
| Dec 9, 2006*; 3:00 p.m., ESPN2 | | vs. Michigan State; Spartan Clash | L 61–76 | 5–3 | Palace of Auburn Hills (11,187); Auburn Hills, Michigan |
| Dec 13, 2006*; 7:00 p.m. | | at Lamar | L 77–86 ^{OT} | 5–4 | Montagne Center; Beaumont, Texas |
| Dec 16, 2006*; 4:00 p.m., The Mtn. | | Utah State | W 75–62 | 6–4 | Marriott Center; Provo, Utah |
| Dec 22, 2006*; 7:00 p.m. | | Western Oregon | W 102–40 | 7–4 | Marriott Center (8,277); Provo, Utah |
| Dec 28, 2006*; 7:30 p.m. | | Liberty; BYU Holiday Classic | W 73–59 | 8–4 | Marriott Center; Provo, Utah |
| Dec 29, 2006*; 7:30 p.m. | | Oral Roberts; BYU Holiday Classic | W 72–62 | 9–4 | Marriott Center; Provo, Utah |
| Dec 30, 2006*; 7:30 p.m. | | Seton Hall; BYU Holiday Classic | W 77–68 | 10–4 | Marriott Center; Provo, Utah |
MWC Regular Season
| Jan 6, 2007; 3:30 p.m. | | San Diego State | W 80–58 | 11–4 (1–0) | Marriott Center; Provo, Utah |
| Jan 10, 2007; 7:00 p.m., The Mtn. | | TCU | W 89–65 | 12–4 (2–0) | Marriott Center (10,806); Provo, Utah |
| Jan 13, 2007; 7:00 p.m., The Mtn. | | at UNLV | L 75–83 | 12–5 (2–1) | Thomas & Mack Center; Paradise, Nevada |
| Jan 16, 2007; 6:00 p.m., The Mtn. | | Wyoming | W 89–81 | 13–5 (3–1) | Marriott Center; Provo, Utah |
| Jan 20, 2007; 3:30 p.m., The Mtn. | | at Colorado State | L 78–90 | 13–6 (3–2) | Moby Arena; Fort Collins, Colorado |
| Jan 24, 2007; 8:00 p.m., The Mtn. | | at New Mexico | W 70–49 | 14–6 (4–2) | The Pit; Albuquerque, New Mexico |
| Jan 27, 2007; 4:00 p.m., The Mtn. | | No. 16 Air Force | W 61–52 | 15–6 (5–2) | Marriott Center (22,700); Provo, Utah |
| Jan 31, 2007; 8:00 p.m., The Mtn. | | at Utah | W 76–66 | 16–6 (6–2) | Jon M. Huntsman Center; Salt Lake City, Utah |
| Feb 3, 2007; 3:30 p.m., The Mtn. | | UNLV | W 90–63 | 17–6 (7–2) | Marriott Center; Provo, Utah |
| Feb 6, 2007; 7:00 p.m., The Mtn. | | at Wyoming | W 77–73 | 18–6 (8–2) | Arena-Auditorium; Laramie, Wyoming |
| Feb 10, 2007; 7:00 p.m. | | at TCU | W 85–72 | 19–6 (9–2) | Daniel–Meyer Coliseum (4,824); Fort Worth, Texas |
| Feb 14, 2007; 7:00 p.m., The Mtn. | | New Mexico | W 96–83 | 20–6 (10–2) | Marriott Center; Provo, Utah |
| Feb 21, 2007; 8:00 p.m., The Mtn. | | Colorado State | W 76–67 | 21–6 (11–2) | Marriott Center; Provo, Utah |
| Feb 24, 2007; 3:00 p.m., CST | No. 21 | at San Diego State | L 74–86 | 21–7 (11–3) | Viejas Arena; San Diego, California |
| Feb 27, 2007; 7:00 p.m., CST | | at No. 25 Air Force | W 62–58 | 22–7 (12–3) | Clune Arena (6,146); Colorado Springs, Colorado |
| Mar 3, 2007; 5:30 p.m., CST | | Utah | W 85–62 | 23–7 (13–3) | Marriott Center; Provo, Utah |
MWC tournament
| Mar 8, 2007; 12:00 p.m., The Mtn. | (1) No. 23 | vs. (8) TCU; Quarterfinals | W 77–64 | 24–7 | Thomas & Mack Center; Las Vegas, Nevada |
| Mar 9, 2007; 6:00 p.m., CST | (1) No. 23 | vs. (5) Wyoming; Semifinals | W 96–84 | 25–7 | Thomas & Mack Center; Las Vegas, Nevada |
| Mar 10, 2007; 4:00 p.m. | (1) No. 23 | vs. (2) No. 25 UNLV; Championship | L 70–78 | 25–8 | Thomas & Mack Center; Las Vegas, Nevada |
NCAA tournament
| Mar 15, 2007*; 9:30 p.m., CBS | (8 S) No. 24 | vs. (9 S) Xavier; First Round | L 77–79 | 25–9 | Rupp Arena; Lexington, Kentucky |
*Non-conference game. ^{#}Rankings from AP Poll. (#) Tournament seedings in parentheses. S=South. All times are in Mountain.
