= Lon Kruger =

American basketball coach (born 1952)

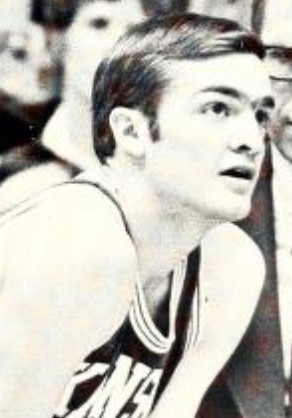
- Kruger at Kansas State

Biographical details
- Born: August 19, 1952 (age 74); Silver Lake, Kansas, U.S.

Playing career
- 1971–1974: Kansas State
- Position: Point guard

Coaching career (HC unless noted)
- 1976–1977: Pittsburg State (assistant)
- 1977–1978: Kansas State (assistant)
- 1979–1982: Kansas State (assistant)
- 1982–1986: Pan American
- 1986–1990: Kansas State
- 1990–1996: Florida
- 1996–2000: Illinois
- 2000–2003: Atlanta Hawks
- 2003–2004: New York Knicks (assistant)
- 2004–2011: UNLV
- 2011–2021: Oklahoma

Head coaching record
- Overall: 674–432 (.609) (college); 69–122 (.348) (NBA)

Accomplishments and honors

Championships
- 2 NCAA Division I Regional—Final Four (1994, 2016); Big Ten regular season (1998); 2 MWC tournament (2007, 2008)

Awards
- 2× SEC Coach of the Year (1992, 1994); MWC Coach of the Year (2008); 2× Big Eight Player of the Year (1973, 1974)
- College Basketball Hall of Fame; Inducted in 2022
Medal record
Men's basketball
Assistant coach for United States
FIBA Basketball World Cup
Bronze medal – third place	1998 Greece	National team

Lonnie Duane Kruger (born August 19, 1952) is an American former college and professional basketball coach. Kruger played college basketball for Kansas State University. He served as the head coach of the University of Texas–Pan American, Kansas State, University of Florida, University of Illinois, University of Nevada, Las Vegas, and University of Oklahoma as well as the Atlanta Hawks of the National Basketball Association (NBA).

Kruger was the first coach to lead five programs to the NCAA tournament (he has since been joined by Tubby Smith, Rick Pitino and Steve Alford). His teams participated in 21 NCAA Tournaments, including two Final Fours (1994 with Florida; 2016 with Oklahoma).

== Early life ==
Kruger was born and raised in Silver Lake, Kansas. As a point guard, Kruger led the Kansas State Wildcats to back-to-back Big Eight championships in 1972 and 1973 under coach Jack Hartman. Kruger was named the Big Eight Player of the Year in 1973 and 1974, after being named the Big Eight Sophomore of the Year in 1972. He was also a shortstop on the Kansas State baseball team.

He was a ninth-round pick of the Atlanta Hawks in the 1974 NBA draft. Kruger also tried out with the Detroit Pistons, and played professionally in Israel. He also played a season of minor league baseball in the St. Louis Cardinals organization and was invited to training camp with the Dallas Cowboys as a quarterback.

== Head coaching career ==
Kruger started his career coaching at the University of Texas Pan American. He rescinded an offer made to Mark Calaway while coaching UT Pan America. Mark would become WWE legend The Undertaker.

=== Kansas State ===
As basketball coach of the Wildcats, Kruger led K-State to the NCAA tournament in each of his four seasons as head coach and the Elite Eight in 1988 — a team featuring future NBA players Mitch Richmond and Steve Henson — before losing to archrival Kansas Jayhawks, the eventual national champion.

From Kansas State, Kruger moved south to the University of Florida, taking over a program that had limited success not only nationally, but in the Southeastern Conference.

=== Florida ===
In his six seasons with Florida, Kruger compiled a 104–80 mark. In the process, he led the University of Florida to its first Final Four appearance in 1994.

He was named SEC coach of the year in 1992 and 1994.

=== Illinois ===
Kruger accepted the vacant position at Illinois. While there, he became the only Big Ten coach to successfully sign three consecutive Illinois Mr. Basketball winners, after inking Sergio McClain, Frank Williams, and Brian Cook between 1997 and 1999. Kruger left the university to accept the head coaching job for the Atlanta Hawks of the NBA in 2000.

=== UNLV ===
Kruger accepted the job at UNLV in 2004. His son, Kevin, took advantage of a new NCAA rule, called Proposal 2005–54, before the 2006–2007 season to transfer from Arizona State and immediately play for his father at UNLV without sitting out one year. The controversial rule was repealed for the following season due to what some claimed were the unintended consequence of allowing players with undergraduate diplomas to immediately begin playing for another school without sitting out for any time.

In 2007, Kruger led the Runnin' Rebels to the Sweet Sixteen of the NCAA Tournament, which was the team's first trip there since Jerry Tarkanian led it in 1991.

On February 9, 2008, the UNLV Runnin' Rebels beat Colorado State 68–51 at home for Kruger's 400th career win.

=== Oklahoma ===
On April 1, 2011, Kruger accepted the head coaching position with the Oklahoma Sooners, replacing the fired Jeff Capel. Kruger's new compensation package reportedly exceed $2.2 million annually. Despite his success, he was not immune to criticism, having won just one regular season conference championship in his lengthy college coaching career (Illinois tied for the Big Ten title in 1997–98). However, Kruger has generally enjoyed a positive reputation.

On November 30, 2012, Kruger earned his 500th career head coaching victory as the Sooners beat Northwestern State 69–65 in Norman.

On March 17, 2013, Kruger became the only head coach in Division I history to lead five programs to the NCAA tournament when the Sooners were named a No. 10 seed in the South region. The feat was later matched by Tubby Smith in 2016 when he took Texas Tech to the tournament.

On March 20, 2015, Kruger became the only head coach in Division I history to win an NCAA tournament game with five programs. He is one of four active coaches who have had three teams in the Elite Eight.

Kruger reached his second career Final Four, this time with Oklahoma, in 2016.

On February 25, 2017, Kruger earned his 600th career head coaching victory as the Sooners beat Kansas State 81–51 in Norman.

After 10 seasons at OU, it was announced on March 25, 2021, that he planned to retire.

== Professional coaching ==
Prior to accepting the head coaching position at UNLV in 2004, Kruger was the head coach of the Atlanta Hawks of the NBA. It was as head coach of the Hawks that Kruger guaranteed season-ticket holders in 2003 that the Hawks would make the playoffs or get a $125 refund. The Hawks failed to make the playoffs and Kruger was fired midway through the 2002–2003 season.

Kruger was an assistant coach under Rudy Tomjanovich for the US national team in the 1998 FIBA World Championship, winning the bronze medal.

== Head coaching record ==
=== College ===
Record table
Season	Team	Overall	Conference	Standing	Postseason
Pan American Broncs (NCAA Division I independent) (1982–1986)
1982–83	Pan American	7–21			
1983–84	Pan American	13–14			
1984–85	Pan American	12–16			
1985–86	Pan American	20–8			
Pan American:		52–59 (.468)			
Kansas State Wildcats (Big Eight Conference) (1986–1990)
1986–87	Kansas State	20–11	8–6	4th	NCAA Division I Round of 32
1987–88	Kansas State	25–9	11–3	2nd	NCAA Division I Elite Eight
1988–89	Kansas State	19–11	8–6	3rd	NCAA Division I Round of 64
1989–90	Kansas State	17–15	7–7	4th	NCAA Division I Round of 64
Kansas State:		81–46 (.638)	34–22 (.607)		
Florida Gators (Southeastern Conference) (1990–1996)
1990–91	Florida	11–17	7–11	6th	
1991–92	Florida	19–14	9–7	2nd (East)	NIT semifinal
1992–93	Florida	16–12	9–7	3rd (East)	NIT first round
1993–94	Florida	29–8	12–4	T–1st (East)	NCAA Division I Final Four
1994–95	Florida	17–13	8–8	3rd (East)	NCAA Division I Round of 64
1995–96	Florida	12–16	6–10	5th (East)	
Florida:		104–80 (.565)	51–47 (.520)		
Illinois Fighting Illini (Big Ten Conference) (1996–2000)
1996–97	Illinois	22–10	11–7	4th	NCAA Division I Round of 32
1997–98	Illinois	23–10	13–3	T–1st	NCAA Division I Round of 32
1998–99	Illinois	14–18	3–13	11th	
1999–2000	Illinois	22–10	11–5	5th	NCAA Division I Round of 32
Illinois:		81–48 (.628)	38–28 (.576)		
UNLV Runnin' Rebels (Mountain West Conference) (2004–2011)
2004–05	UNLV	17–14	7–7	4th	NIT second round
2005–06	UNLV	17–13	10–6	4th	
2006–07	UNLV	30–7	12–4	2nd	NCAA Division I Sweet 16
2007–08	UNLV	27–8	12–4	2nd	NCAA Division I Round of 32
2008–09	UNLV	21–11	9–7	5th	NIT first round
2009–10	UNLV	25–9	11–5	T–3rd	NCAA Division I Round of 64
2010–11	UNLV	24–9	11–5	3rd	NCAA Division I Round of 64
UNLV:		161–71 (.694)	72–38 (.655)		
Oklahoma Sooners (Big 12 Conference) (2011–2021)
2011–12	Oklahoma	15–16	5–13	8th	
2012–13	Oklahoma	20–12	11–7	4th	NCAA Division I Round of 64
2013–14	Oklahoma	23–10	12–6	2nd	NCAA Division I Round of 64
2014–15	Oklahoma	24–11	12–6	T–2nd	NCAA Division I Sweet 16
2015–16	Oklahoma	29–8	12–6	3rd	NCAA Division I Final Four
2016–17	Oklahoma	11–20	5–13	9th	
2017–18	Oklahoma	18–14	8–10	T–8th	NCAA Division I Round of 64
2018–19	Oklahoma	20–14	7–11	T–7th	NCAA Division I Round of 32
2019–20	Oklahoma	19–12	9–9	T–3rd	NCAA Division I Canceled*
2020–21	Oklahoma	16–11	9–8	T–6th	NCAA Division I Round of 32
Oklahoma:		195–128 (.604)	90–89 (.503)		
Total:		674–432 (.609)			
National champion Postseason invitational champion Conference regular season champion Conference regular season and conference tournament champion Division regular season champion Division regular season and conference tournament champion Conference tournament champion

*The 2020 NCAA tournament was canceled due to concerns over the coronavirus pandemic.

=== NBA ===
Legend
Regular season	G	Games coached	W	Games won	L	Games lost	W–L %	Win–loss %
Playoffs	PG	Playoff games	PW	Playoff wins	PL	Playoff losses	PW–L %	Playoff win–loss %

Team	Year	G	W	L	W–L%	Finish	PG	PW	PL	PW–L%	Result
Atlanta	2000–01	82	25	57	.305	7th in Central	—	—	—	—	Missed Playoffs
Atlanta	2001–02	82	33	49	.402	6th in Central	—	—	—	—	Missed Playoffs
Atlanta	2002–03	27	11	16	.407	(fired)	—	—	—	—	—
Career		191	69	122	.361	–	—	—	—	—	

== See also ==
- List of college men's basketball coaches with 600 wins
- List of NCAA Division I Men's Final Four appearances by coach

== Bibliography ==
- Dortch, Chris, String Music: Inside the Rise of SEC Basketball, Brassey's, Inc., Dulles, Virginia (2002). ISBN 1-57488-439-5.
- Koss, Bill, Pond Birds: Gator Basketball, The Whole Story From The Inside, Fast Break Press, Gainesville, Florida (1996). ISBN 978-0-8130-1523-1.
