= 2015–16 BYU Cougars men's basketball team =

American college basketball season

2015–16 BYU Cougars men's basketball

NIT, Semifinals
- Conference: West Coast Conference
- Record: 1–10 (25 wins, 1 loss vacated)* (0–5 (13 wins vacated) WCC)
- Head coach: Dave Rose (11th season)
- Assistant coaches: Tim LaComb (6th season); Terry Nashif (9th season); Quincy Lewis (1st season)
- Home arena: Marriott Center

2015–16 West Coast Conference men's basketball standings
	Conf.				Overall
Team	W		L	PCT	W		L	PCT
Saint Mary's	15	–	3	.833	29	–	6	.829
Gonzaga †	15	–	3	.833	28	–	8	.778
BYU	13	–	5	.722	26	–	11	.703
Pepperdine	10	–	8	.556	18	–	14	.563
San Francisco	8	–	10	.444	15	–	15	.500
Santa Clara	7	–	11	.389	11	–	20	.355
Portland	6	–	12	.333	12	–	20	.375
Loyola Marymount	6	–	12	.333	14	–	17	.452
Pacific*	6	–	12	.333	8	–	20	.286
San Diego	4	–	14	.222	9	–	21	.300
† Conference tournament winner *ineligible for postseason due to self probation

The 2015–16 BYU Cougars men's basketball team represented Brigham Young University in the 2015–16 NCAA Division I men's basketball season. It was head coach Dave Rose's eleventh season at BYU and the Cougars fifth season in the West Coast Conference. The Cougars once again played their home games at the Marriott Center.

As a result of a scandal surrounding inappropriate benefits received by BYU starting guard Nick Emery from a BYU booster, the NCAA vacated all of BYU's wins for the 2015–16 and 2016–17 seasons with the exception of a 2015 win over Weber State in which Nick Emery did not play.

== Before the season ==
=== Departures ===
Ten individuals left the BYU program following the 2014–15 season—four players graduated (including BYU's all-time scoring leader Tyler Haws), two others transferred, and three more left for missions and are expected to return in 2017–18. The remaining individual was assistant coach Mark Pope, who left to become the new head coach at Utah Valley.

Name	Number	Pos.	Height	Weight	Year	Hometown	Notes
Tyler Haws	3	G	6'5"	200	Senior	Alpine, UT	Graduated. Signed with Obradoiro CAB in Spain (2015).
Ryan Andrus	10	F	6'8"	200	Freshman	American Fork, UT	LDS mission (returning in 2017)
Josh Sharp	12	F	6'7"	185	RS Senior	Highland, UT	Graduated.
Anson Winder	20	G	6'3"	195	RS Senior	Las Vegas, NV	Graduated.
Skyler Halford	23	G	6'1"	190	RS Senior	Orem, UT	Graduated.
Frank Bartley	24	G	6'3"	200	Sophomore	Baton Rouge, LA	Transferred to Louisiana–Lafayette.
Dalton Nixon	30	F	6'7"	190	Freshman	Orem, UT	LDS mission (returning in 2017)
Isaac Neilson	35	C	6'10"	230	RS Sophomore	Mission Viejo, CA	Transferred to Utah Valley.
Luke Worthingon	41	F	6'9"	240	Sophomore	Mequon, WI	LDS mission (returning in 2017)

=== Recruiting ===
BYU has one high school graduate joining the school for the 2015–16 season.

College recruiting (2015)
Name	Hometown	School	Height	Weight	Commit date
Zac Seljaas; G	Bountiful, Utah	Bountiful	6 ft 7 in (2.01 m)	210 lb (95 kg)	May 19, 2014
Zac Seljaas; G	Recruit ratings: Scout: Rivals: 247Sports: (75)				
Overall recruit ranking: Scout: nr Rivals: nr 247Sports: 109 ESPN: nr
Note: In many cases, Scout, Rivals, 247Sports, On3, and ESPN may conflict in their listings of height and weight.; In these cases, the average was taken. ESPN grades are on a 100-point scale.; Sources: "BYU 2015 Basketball Commitments". Rivals.; "2015 BYU Basketball Commits". Scout.; "ESPN". ESPN.; "Scout.com Team Recruiting Rankings". Scout.; "2015 Team Ranking". Rivals.; "2015 BYU Basketball Commits". 247Sports.

=== 2014–15 return missionaries ===
BYU will debut three returned missionaries for the 2015–16 season. Nick Emery, Jakob Hartsock, and Braiden Shaw will all have their debut season for the Cougars after serving missions.

College recruiting (2013)
Name	Hometown	School	Height	Weight	Commit date
Nick Emery; G	Alpine, Utah	Lone Peak	6 ft 2 in (1.88 m)	180 lb (82 kg)	Aug 30, 2011
Nick Emery; G	Recruit ratings: Scout: Rivals: 247Sports: (86)				
Jakob Hartsock; F	Bartlesville, Oklahoma	Bartlesville	6 ft 7 in (2.01 m)	205 lb (93 kg)	Feb 26, 2012
Jakob Hartsock; F	Recruit ratings: Scout: Rivals: 247Sports: (72)				
Braiden Shaw; F	Eagle, Idaho	Eagle	6 ft 8 in (2.03 m)	210 lb (95 kg)	Oct 9, 2011
Braiden Shaw; F	Recruit ratings: Scout: Rivals: 247Sports: (70)				
Overall recruit ranking: Scout: 22 Rivals: 17 247Sports: 17 ESPN: 16
Note: In many cases, Scout, Rivals, 247Sports, On3, and ESPN may conflict in their listings of height and weight.; In these cases, the average was taken. ESPN grades are on a 100-point scale.; Sources: "BYU 2013 Basketball Commitments". Rivals.; "2013 BYU Basketball Commits". Scout.; "ESPN". ESPN.; "Scout.com Team Recruiting Rankings". Scout.; "2013 Team Ranking". Rivals.; "2013 BYU Basketball Commits". 247Sports.

BYU will also see the return of two familiar faces who came to school for one season. Both Cory Calvert & Cooper Ainge return from their missions.

College recruiting (2012)
Name	Hometown	School	Height	Weight	Commit date
Cooper Ainge; PG	Wellesley, Massachusetts	Wellesley	6 ft 0 in (1.83 m)	175 lb (79 kg)	Oct 3, 2011
Cooper Ainge; PG	Recruit ratings: (40)				
Cory Calvert; SG	Parker, Colorado	Chaparral	6 ft 3 in (1.91 m)	185 lb (84 kg)	Sep 10, 2011
Cory Calvert; SG	Recruit ratings: Scout: (40)				
Overall recruit ranking: Scout: nr Rivals: nr ESPN: nr
Note: In many cases, Scout, Rivals, 247Sports, On3, and ESPN may conflict in their listings of height and weight.; In these cases, the average was taken. ESPN grades are on a 100-point scale.; Sources: "BYU 2012 Basketball Commitments". Rivals.; "2012 BYU Basketball Commits". Scout.; "ESPN". ESPN.; "Scout.com Team Recruiting Rankings". Scout.; "2012 Team Ranking". Rivals.

=== Walk-ons ===
In addition to Cooper Ainge returning from his mission as a walk-on, BYU will be joined by new walk-on Alan Hamson.

=== Transfers ===
On July 28, 2015, Elijah Bryant announced he would transfer to BYU from Elon. Bryant won the CAA Rookie of the Year title in the 2014–15 season. Bryant will redshirt the 2015–16 season and begin play with BYU as a Redshirt Sophomore in 2016–17.

== 2015–16 media ==
=== Nu Skin Cougar IMG Sports Network ===
KSL 102.7 FM and 1160 AM- Flagship Station (Salt Lake City/ Provo, UT and ksl.com)
BYU Radio- Nationwide (Dish Network 980, Sirius XM 143, and byuradio.org)
KTHK- Blackfoot/ Idaho Falls/ Pocatello/ Rexburg, ID
KMGR- Manti, UT
KSUB- Cedar City, UT
KDXU- St. George, UT

== Roster ==
(Subject to change)

2015–16 BYU Cougars men's basketball team
Players
Coaches

Pos.	#	Name	Height	Weight	Year	Previous school	Hometown
G	1	Chase Fischer (C)	6 ft 3 in (1.91 m)	190 lb (86 kg)	RS Sr	Ripley; Wake Forest	Ripley, WV
F	2	Zac Seljaas	6 ft 7 in (2.01 m)	215 lb (98 kg)	Fr	Bountiful	Bountiful, UT
G	3	Elijah Bryant (I) (redshirt)	6 ft 4 in (1.93 m)	210 lb (95 kg)	So	New Hampton School; Elon	Gwinnett, GA
G	4	Nick Emery	6 ft 2 in (1.88 m)	185 lb (84 kg)	Fr	Lone Peak	Alpine, UT
G	5	Kyle Collinsworth (C)	6 ft 6 in (1.98 m)	215 lb (98 kg)	Sr	Provo	Provo, UT
C	12	Alan Hamson (W) (redshirt)	7 ft 2 in (2.18 m)	210 lb (95 kg)	Fr	Pleasant Grove	Pleasant Grove, UT
G	15	Jake Toolson	6 ft 5 in (1.96 m)	205 lb (93 kg)	So	Highland	Gilbert, AZ
F	21	Kyle Davis	6 ft 8 in (2.03 m)	225 lb (102 kg)	RS Jr	Alta; Southern Utah; Utah State	Draper, UT
G	25	Jordan Chatman	6 ft 5 in (1.96 m)	195 lb (88 kg)	RS Fr	Union	Vancouver, WA
F	31	Braiden Shaw	6 ft 8 in (2.03 m)	210 lb (95 kg)	Fr	Eagle	Eagle, ID
F	33	Nate Austin (W, C)	6 ft 11 in (2.11 m)	245 lb (111 kg)	RS Sr	Lone Peak	Alpine, UT
F	34	Jakob Hartsock	6 ft 8 in (2.03 m)	205 lb (93 kg)	Fr	Bartlesville	Bartlesville, OK
F	40	Jamal Aytes	6 ft 6 in (1.98 m)	235 lb (107 kg)	RS So	JSerra; UNLV	San Diego, CA
C	44	Corbin Kaufusi	6 ft 10 in (2.08 m)	255 lb (116 kg)	So	Timpview	Provo, UT

Head coach

- Dave Rose (Houston)

Assistant coach(es)

- Tim LaComb- Assoc. Head Coach (Utah)
- Terry Nashif (BYU)
- Quincy Lewis (Wagner)

Legend

- (C) Team captain
- (S) Suspended
- (I) Ineligible
- (W) Walk-on
- Injured
- Current redshirt

- On November 20, Cooper Ainge, a Guard out of Wellesley, Massachusetts and son of Danny Ainge, announced he would leave the team to focus on his studies. On that same day Alan Hamson announced he would redshirt the current season.
- On December 14, Cory Calvert announced he was leaving the team for the remainder of the season and would transfer from BYU.
- On December 21, Jake Toolson was granted a medical leave from the team.

== Schedule ==
- The 2015–16 schedule begins with a Summer Trip to Spain and features matches against state rivals Utah, Utah State, and Weber State. BYU will also return to Hawaii in 2015 to participate in the Diamond Head Classic.
- Matches airing on both BYUtv and Root Sports are BYUtv productions for the WCC. BYUtv is producing the game and airing it nationally while WCC Game of the Week affiliates air it regionally.

Asterisk next to a score indicates a win that was forfeited due to NCAA-imposed sanctions (the only win not forfeited was December 5, 2015 against Weber State, in which Nick Emery did not play).

Date time, TV	Rank^{#}	Opponent^{#}	Result	Record	Site city, state
Exhibition
08/19/2015*; 12:00 pm, Periscope		Eurocolegio Casvi	W 95–74	–	Madrid, Spain
08/20/2015*; 10:00 am		Albacete Basket	W 75–52	–	Albacete, Spain
08/24/2015*; 12:00 pm, Periscope		European Basketball Academy	W 102–74	–	Barcelona, Spain
08/25/2015*; 12:00 pm, Periscope		CB Castelldefels	W 82–55	–	Barcelona, Spain
10/30/2015*; 7:30 pm, BYUtv		Arizona Christian	W 103–75	–	Marriott Center; Provo, UT
11/07/2015*; 7:30 pm, BYUtv		Alaska	W 77–64	–	Marriott Center; Provo, UT
Non-conference regular season
11/13/2015*; 7:00 pm, BYUtv		Utah Valley; Old Oquirrh Bucket	W 85–54*	1–0	Marriott Center; Provo, UT
11/16/2015*; 11:45 pm, ESPN2		at Long Beach State; ESPN College Hoops Tipoff Marathon	L 65–66	1–1	Walter Pyramid; Long Beach, CA
11/20/2015*; 7:00 pm, BYUtv		Adams State	W 97–56*	2–1	Marriott Center; Provo, UT
11/25/2015*; 7:00 pm, BYUtv		Mississippi Valley State	W 75–68*	3–1	Marriott Center; Provo, UT
11/28/2015*; 7:00 pm, BYUtv		Belmont	W 95–81*	4–1	Marriott Center; Provo, UT
12/02/2015*; 8:00 pm, P12N		at Utah; Old Oquirrh Bucket/Deseret First Duel	L 75–83	4–2	Jon M. Huntsman Center; Salt Lake City, UT
12/05/2015*; 1:00 pm, BYUtv		vs. Weber State; Old Oquirrh Bucket	W 73–68	5–2	Vivint Smart Home Arena; Salt Lake City, UT
12/09/2015*; 7:00 pm, BYUtv		Utah State; Old Oquirrh Bucket	W 80–68*	6–2	Marriott Center; Provo, UT
12/12/2015*; 6:00 pm, P12N		at Colorado	L 83–92	6–3	Coors Events Center; Boulder, CO
12/18/2015*; 7:00 pm, BYUtv		Central Michigan	W 98–85*	7–3	Marriott Center; Provo, UT
12/22/2015*; 2:30 pm, ESPNU		vs. Harvard; Diamond Head Classic quarterfinals	L 82–85 ^{OT}	7–4	Stan Sheriff Center; Honolulu, HI
12/23/2015*; 12:30 pm, ESPNU		vs. New Mexico; Diamond Head Classic Consolation	W 96–66*	8–4	Stan Sheriff Center; Honolulu, HI
12/25/2015*; 1:30 pm, ESPNU		vs. Northern Iowa; 2015 Diamond Head Classic 5th Place	W 84–76*	9–4	Stan Sheriff Center; Honolulu, HI
WCC Regular Season
12/31/2015; 9:00 pm, ESPNU		at Saint Mary's	L 74–85	9–5 (0–1)	McKeon Pavilion; Moraga, CA
01/02/2016; 4:00 pm, RTUT		at Pacific	W 81–67*	10–5 (1–1)	Alex G. Spanos Center; Stockton, CA
01/07/2016; 9:00 pm, ESPNU		Santa Clara	W 97–61*	11–5 (2–1)	Marriott Center; Provo, UT
01/09/2016; 7:00 pm, BYUtv		San Francisco	W 102–92*	12–5 (3–1)	Marriott Center; Provo, UT
01/14/2016; 7:00 pm, ESPN2		at No. 25/21 Gonzaga	W 69–68*	13–5 (4–1)	McCarthey Athletic Center; Spokane, WA
01/16/2016; 4:00 pm, RTUT		at Portland	L 81–84	13–6 (4–2)	Chiles Center; Portland, OR
01/21/2016; 9:00 pm, RTUT; BYUtv		at Loyola Marymount	W 91–80*	14–6 (5–2)	Gersten Pavilion; Los Angeles, CA
01/23/2016; 6:00 pm, BYUtv		at Pepperdine	L 65–71	14–7 (5–3)	Firestone Fieldhouse; Malibu, CA
01/28/2016; 9:00 pm, ESPNU		Loyola Marymount	W 87–62*	15–7 (6–3)	Marriott Center; Provo, UT
01/30/2016; 8:00 pm, ESPN2		Pepperdine	W 88–77*	16–7 (7–3)	Marriott Center; Provo, UT
02/04/2016; 7:00 pm, BYUtv		No. RV/25 Saint Mary's	W 70–59*	17–7 (8–3)	Marriott Center; Provo, UT
02/06/2016; 2:00 pm, RTUT; BYUtv		Pacific	L 72–77	17–8 (8–4)	Marriott Center; Provo, UT
02/11/2016; 8:00 pm, BYUtv		at San Francisco	W 114–89*	18–8 (9–4)	War Memorial Gymnasium; San Francisco, CA
02/13/2016; 2:00 pm, RTUT; BYUtv		at Santa Clara	W 96–62*	19–8 (10–4)	Leavey Center; Santa Clara, CA
02/18/2016; 9:00 pm, ESPNU		at San Diego	W 69–67*	20–8 (11–4)	Jenny Craig Pavilion; San Diego, CA
02/20/2016; 7:00 pm, BYUtv		San Diego	W 91–33*	21–8 (12–4)	Marriott Center; Provo, UT
02/25/2016; 9:00 pm, ESPNU		Portland	W 99–81*	22–8 (13–4)	Marriott Center; Provo, UT
02/27/2016; 6:00 pm, ESPN2		Gonzaga	L 68–71	22–9 (13–5)	Marriott Center; Provo, UT
WCC Tournament
03/05/2016; 2:00 pm, BYUtv	(3)	vs. (6) Santa Clara; Quarterfinals	W 72–60*	23–9	Orleans Arena; Paradise, NV
03/07/2016; 9:30 pm, ESPN2	(3)	vs. (2) Gonzaga; Semifinals	L 84–88	23–10	Orleans Arena; Paradise, NV
National Invitation Tournament
03/16/2016*; 8:00 pm, ESPNU	(2)	(7) UAB; First Round – St. Bonaventure Bracket	W 97–79*	24–10	Marriott Center; Provo, UT
03/18/2016*; 7:30 pm, ESPNU	(2)	(3) Virginia Tech; Second Round – St. Bonaventure Bracket	W 80–77*	25–10	Marriott Center; Provo, UT
03/22/2016*; 7:00 pm, ESPN	(2)	(4) Creighton; Quarterfinals – St. Bonaventure Bracket	W 88–82*	26–10	Marriott Center; Provo, UT
03/29/2016*; 5:00 pm, ESPN	(2)	vs. (1) Valparaiso; Semifinals	L 70–72	26–11	Madison Square Garden; New York City, NY
*Non-conference game. ^{#}Rankings from AP Poll / Coaches' Poll. (#) Tournament seedings in parentheses. All times are in Mountain.

== Game summaries ==
=== Eurocolegio Casvi ===
Starting Lineups:

- BYU: Chase Fischer, Kyle Collinsworth, Kyle Davis, Nate Austin, Corbin Kaufusi
- Eurocolegio Casvi: Nicol Bermúdez De Castro, Jorg Sánchez Domínguez, Héctor Jiménez Redondo, Eduard Gómez Fernández, Walter Cabral

Aug 19
12:00 p.m. MDT

Recap

BYU Cougars 95, Eurocolegio Casvi 74
Scoring by half: 52–41, 43–33
Pts: Chase Fischer 16; Rebs: Nate Austin 13; Asts: Corbin Kaufusi 4	Pts: Héctor Jiménez Redondo 18; Rebs: Jorg Sánchez Domínguez 7 Asts: Adrián Uso Estrella 2

Madrid, Spain

=== Albacete Basket ===
Starting Lineups:

- BYU: Chase Fischer, Zac Seljaas, Kyle Collinsworth, Kyle Davis, Corbin Kaufusi
- Albacete Basket: Georvys Elias Sayu, Juan Carlos Vilches, Diego Javier Fox Esm, Miguel Raez Cuenca, Jose Maria Lopez

Aug 20
10:00 a.m. MDT

Recap

BYU Cougars 75, Albacete Basket 52
Scoring by half: 34–34, 41–18
Pts: Kyle Collinsworth 15; Rebs: Corbin Kaufusi 12; Asts: Kyle Collinsworth 8	Pts: Miguel Raez Cuenca 17; Rebs: Miguel Raez Cuenca 10; Asts: Diego Javier Fox Esm & Alvaro Picazo Serran 3

Albacete, Spain

=== European Basketball Academy ===
Starting Lineups:

- BYU: Chase Fischer, Nick Emery, Kyle Collinsworth, Jordan Chatman, Nate Austin
- European Basketball Academy: Not listed

Aug 24
12:00 p.m. MDT

Recap

BYU Cougars 102, European Basketball Academy 74
Scoring by half: 42–40, 60–34
Pts: Chase Fischer 22; Rebs: Corbin Kaufusi 10; Asts: Kyle Collinsworth 14	Pts: Not listed Rebs: Not listed Asts: Not listed

Barcelona, Spain

=== CB Castelldefels ===
Starting Lineups:

- BYU: Chase Fischer, Kyle Collinsworth, Kyle Davis, Jordan Chatman, Corbin Kaufusi
- CB Castelldefels: Not listed

Aug 25
12:00 p.m. MDT

Recap

BYU Cougars 82, CB Castelldefels 55
Scoring by half: 34–36, 48–19
Pts: Chase Fischer 20; Rebs: Kyle Davis & Corbin Kaufusi 13; Asts: Kyle Collinsworth 5	Pts: Not listed Rebs: Not listed Asts: Not listed

Barcelona, Spain

=== Papa John's Cougar Tipoff ===
Broadcasters: Spencer Linton & Jarom Jordan
Starting Lineups:

- BYU White: Zac Seljaas, Jordan Chatman, Elijah Bryant, Braiden Shaw, Jakob Hartsock
- BYU Blue: Chase Fischer, Nick Emery, Jake Toolson, Kyle Davis, Jamal Aytes

byutv.org

Oct 28
7:00 p.m. MDT

Recap

BYU White 60, BYU Blue 66
Scoring by half: 37–19, 23–47
Pts: Zac Seljaas 19; Rebs: Zac Seljaas, Briaden Shaw, Jakob Hartsock 4 Asts: Elijah Bryant 4	Pts: Nick Emery 19; Rebs: Kyle Davis 11; Asts: Jake Toolson, Kyle Davis 3

Marriott Center
Provo, UT
Attendance: 4,318
Referees: DG Nelson, Chad Shepherd, Matt Basham

=== Exhibition: Arizona Christian ===
Broadcasters: Dave McCann, Jarom Jordan, & Jason Shepherd
Starting Lineups:

- Arizona Christian: Bobby Gray, Brandon Newman, Chris Sterling, Jackson Helms, Mike Navar
- BYU: Nick Emery, Zac Seljaas, Jake Toolson, Kyle Davis, Nate Austin

BYUtv

Oct 30
7:30 p.m. MDT

Recap

Arizona Christian Firestorm 75, BYU Cougars 103
Scoring by half: 44–44, 31–59
Pts: Chris Sterling 18; Rebs: Bobby Gray 8 Asts: Bobby Gray 7	Pts: Jake Toolson 23; Rebs: Jamal Aytes 7 Asts: Cooper Ainge 7

Marriott Center
Provo, UT
Attendance: 12,269
Referees: Verne Harris, Casey McClellan, Chad Shepherd

=== Exhibition: Alaska ===
Broadcasters: Dave McCann, Blaine Fowler, & Spencer Linton
Starting Lineups:

- Alaska Fairbanks: Alex Duncan, Bangaly Kaba, Joe Slocum, Travante Williams, Almir Hadzisehovic
- BYU: Chase Fischer, Nick Emery, Kyle Collinsworth, Jake Toolson, Nate Austin

BYUtv

Nov 7
7:30 p.m. MST

Recap

Alaska Nanooks 64, BYU Cougars 77
Scoring by half: 25–39, 39–38
Pts: Travante Williams 13; Rebs: Almir Hadzisehovic 9 Asts: Joe Slocum 5	Pts: Chase Fischer 18; Rebs: Nick Emery, Nate Austin 8 Asts: Nick Emery, Kyle Collinsworth 3

Marriott Center
Provo, UT
Attendance: 13,124
Referees: Chris Rastatter, Casey McClellan, Chad Shepherd

=== Utah Valley ===
Broadcasters: Spencer Linton, Blaine Fowler, & Lauren Francom
Series History: BYU leads series 1–0
Starting Lineups:

- Utah Valley: Marcel Davis, Jaden Jackson, Konner Frey, Ivory Young, Andrew Bastien
- BYU: Chase Fischer, Kyle Collinsworth, Jake Toolson, Kyle Davis, Corbin Kaufusi

BYUtv

Nov 13
7 p.m. MST

Recap

Utah Valley Wolverines 54, BYU Cougars 85
Scoring by half: 26–46, 28–39
Pts: Konner Frey 19; Rebs: Konner Frey, Andrew Bastien 6 Asts: Marcel Davis, Telly Davenport, 3	Pts: Chase Fischer 20; Rebs: Kyle Davis 20; Asts: Kyle Collinsworth 7

Marriott Center
Provo, UT
Attendance: 17,683
Referees: Dick Cartmell, Bob Staffen, Rick Batsell

=== Long Beach State ===
Broadcasters: Steve Quis & Brad Daugherty
Series history: BYU leads series 6–4
Starting Lineups:

- BYU: Chase Fischer, Kyle Collinsworth, Jake Toolson, Kyle Davis, Corbin Kaufusi
- Long Beach State: Nick Faust, Roschon Prince, Justin Bibbins, A. J. Spencer, Gabe Levin

ESPN2

Nov 16
10:45 p.m. PST

Recap

BYU Cougars 65, Long Beach State 49ers 66
Scoring by half: 30–36, 35–30
Pts: Corbin Kaufusi 17; Rebs: Kyle Collinsworth 13; Asts: Kyle Collinsworth 6 Kaufusi & Collinsworth both have double-doubles	Pts: Noah Blackwell 11; Rebs: Nick Faust 8 Asts: Justin Bibbins 7

Walter Pyramid
Long Beach, CA
Attendance: 3,412
Referees: Chris Rastatter, Mike Reed, Deron White

=== Adams State ===
Broadcasters: Dave McCann, Blaine Fowler, & Spencer Linton
Series History: First Meeting
Starting Lineups:

- Adams State: EJ Hubbard II, Joe Bell Austin, Shakir Smith, Kendyl Grover, Ante Mioc
- BYU: Chase Fischer, Kyle Collinsworth, Jake Toolson, Kyle Davis, Corbin Kaufusi

BYUtv

Nov 20
7 p.m. MST

Recap

Adams State Grizzlies 56, BYU Cougars 97
Scoring by half: 29–42, 27–55
Pts: Bryan Umoru 12; Rebs: EJ Hubbard II 9 Asts: EJ Hubbard II 4	Pts: Nick Emery 20; Rebs: Kyle Davis 10; Asts: Nick Emery 6

Marriott Center
Provo, UT
Attendance: 12,976
Referees: Casey McClellan, LaDonte King, Coban Lopez

=== Mississippi Valley State ===
Broadcasters: Dave McCann, Blaine Fowler, & Spencer Linton
Series history: Series even 1–1
Starting Lineups:

- Mississippi Valley State: Vacha Vaughn, Damian Young, Ta'Jay Henry, Kylan Phillips, Jabari Alex
- BYU: Chase Fischer, Nick Emery, Kyle Collinsworth, Kyle Davis, Corbin Kaufusi

BYUtv

Nov 25
7 p.m. MST

Recap

Mississippi Valley State Delta Devils 68, BYU Cougars 75
Scoring by half: 32–44, 36–31
Pts: Damian Young 21; Rebs: Michael Matlock 10; Asts: Kylan Phillips 4	Pts: Nick Emery 18; Rebs: Kyle Collinsworth 8 Asts: Nick Emery 7

Marriott Center
Provo, UT
Attendance: 15,467
Referees: Tom O'Neill, Shawn Lehigh, Dennis Flannery

=== Belmont ===
Broadcasters: Dave McCann, Blaine Fowler, & Lauren Francom
Series History: First Meeting
Starting Lineups:

- Belmont: Luke Austin, Taylor Barnette, Craig Bradshaw, Evan Bradds, Tyler Hadden
- BYU: Chase Fischer, Nick Emery, Kyle Collinsworth, Kyle Davis, Corbin Kaufusi

BYUtv

Nov 28
7 p.m. MST

Recap

Belmont Bruins 81, BYU Cougars 95
Scoring by half: 42–40, 39–55
Pts: Craig Bradshaw 26; Rebs: Craig Bradshaw, Dylan Windler 6 Asts: Austin Luke 6	Pts: Nick Emery 27; Rebs: Kyle Davis 14; Asts: Kyle Collinsworth 10; Collinsworth 26 pts, 10 rebs, 10 asts for 7th career triple double, new NCAA record for triple doubles in a career

Marriott Center
Provo, UT
Attendance: 13,712
Referees: Gregory Nixon, Tommy Nunez, Travis Schatzman

=== Utah ===
Broadcasters: Ted Robinson, Bill Walton, & Lewis Johnson
Series history: BYU leads series 129–127
Starting Lineups:

- BYU: Chase Fischer, Nick Emery, Kyle Collinsworth, Kyle Davis, Corbin Kaufusi
- Utah: Brandon Taylor, Jordan Loveridge, Kenneth Ogbe, Kyle Kuzma, Jakob Poeltl

P12

Dec 2
8 p.m. MST

Recap

BYU Cougars 75, Utah Utes 83
Scoring by half: 28–51, 47–32
Pts: Chase Fischer 26; Rebs: Kyle Collinsworth 9 Asts: Kyle Collinsworth 5	Pts: Jakob Poeltl 26; Rebs: Jakob Poeltl 13; Asts: Brandon Taylor 9

Huntsman Center
Salt Lake City, UT
Attendance: 15,131
Referees: Verne Harris, Dick Cartmell, Michael Greenstein

=== Weber State ===
Broadcasters: Dave McCann, Blaine Fowler, & Spencer Linton
Series History: BYU leads series 30–10
Starting Lineups:

- Weber State: Joel Bolomboy, McKay Cannon, Dusty Baker, Jeremy Senglin, Zach Braxton
- BYU: Chase Fischer, Kyle Collinsworth, Jake Toolson, Kyle Davis, Corbin Kaufusi

BYUtv

Dec 5
1 p.m. MST

Recap

Weber State Wildcats 68, BYU Cougars 73
Scoring by half: 37–39, 31–34
Pts: Jeremy Senglin 20; Rebs: Joel Bolomboy 12; Asts: Jeremy Senglin 5	Pts: Chase Fisher 21; Rebs: Kyle Davis 8 Asts: Kyle Collinsworth 10

Vivint Smart Home Arena
Salt Lake City, UT
Attendance: 15,121
Referees: Tony Padilla, Larry Spaulding, Glen Mayberry

=== Utah State ===
Broadcasters: Dave McCann, Blaine Fowler, & Spencer Linton
Series history: BYU leads series 139–92
Starting Lineups:

- Utah State: Darius Perkins, Shane Rector, Jalen Moore, Chris Smith, Elston Jones
- BYU: Chase Fischer, Kyle Collinsworth, Jake Toolson, Kyle Davis, Corbin Kaufusi

BYUtv

Dec 10
7 p.m. MST

Recap

Utah State Aggies 68, BYU Cougars 80
Scoring by half: 24–39, 44–41
Pts: Jalen Moore 15; Rebs: Lew Evans 8 Asts: Shane Rector 6	Pts: Chase Fischer 24; Rebs: Kyle Davis 14; Asts: Kyle Collinsworth 11

Marriott Center
Provo, UT
Attendance: 14,048
Referees: Mike Scyphers, Michael Irving, Rick Batsell

=== Colorado ===
Broadcasters: Jim Watson & Lamar Hurd
Series History: Colorado leads series 16–6
Starting Lineups:

- BYU: Chase Fischer, Nick Emery, Kyle Collinsworth, Kyle Davis, Corbin Kaufusi
- Colorado: Wesley Gordon, Dominique Collier, George King, Josh Scott, Josh Fortune

P12

Dec 12
6:00 p.m. MST

Recap

BYU Cougars 83, Colorado Buffaloes 92
Scoring by half: 36–48, 47–44
Pts: Nick Emery 23; Rebs: Kyle Davis 11; Asts: Kyle Collinsworth 6 Davis' 5th double-double this season	Pts: George King 23; Rebs: Josh Scott 10; Asts: Josh Fortune 5

Coors Events Center
Boulder, CO
Attendance: 8,913
Referees: Chris Rastatter, Gregory Nixon, Nate Harris

=== Central Michigan ===
Broadcasters: Dave McCann, Blaine Fowler, & Lauren Francom
Series History: First Meeting
Starting Lineups:

- Central Michigan: Braylon Rayson, Rayshawn Simmons, Chris Fowler, Luke Meyer, John Simons
- BYU: Chase Fischer, Nick Emery, Kyle Collinsworth, Kyle Davis, Corbin Kaufusi

BYUtv

Dec 18
7 p.m. MST

Recap

Central Michigan Chippewas 85, BYU Cougars 98
Scoring by half: 44–44, 41–54
Pts: Josh Kozinski 18; Rebs: John Simons 9 Asts: Chris Fowler 10	Pts: Zac Seljaas 25; Rebs: Kyle Collinsworth 10; Asts: Kyle Collinsworth 10; Collinsworth triple double #8 (12–10–10)

Marriott Center
Provo, UT
Attendance: 13,408
Referees: Verne Harris, Keith Kimble, Larry Spaudling

=== Harvard ===
Broadcasters: Kanoa Leahey & Cory Alexander
Series History: BYU leads series 1–0
Starting Lineups:

- BYU: Chase Fischer, Nick Emery, Kyle Collinsworth, Kyle Davis, Corbin Kaufusi
- Harvard: Tommy McCarthy, Zena Edosomwan, Corey Johnson, Evan Cummins, Agunwa Okolie

ESPNU

Dec 22
11:30 a.m. HST

Recap

BYU Cougars 82, Harvard Crimson 85 (OT)
Scoring by half: 29–31, 37–35 Overtime: 16–19
Pts: Kyle Collinsworth & Kyle Davis 23; Rebs: Kyle Davis 16; Asts: Kyle Collinsworth 8	Pts: Zena Edosomwan 23; Rebs: Zena Edosomwan 17; Asts: Tommy McCarthy 5

Stan Sheriff Center
Honolulu, Oahu
Attendance: 7,161
Referees: Todd Apo, Duke Edsell, Jason Barker

=== New Mexico ===
Broadcasters: Kanoa Leahey & Cory Alexander
Series History: BYU leads series 76–55
Starting Lineups:

- New Mexico: Cullen Neal, Elijah Brown, Obij Aget, Sam Logwood, Tim Williams
- BYU: Chase Fischer, Nick Emery, Kyle Collinsworth, Kyle Davis, Nate Austin

ESPNU

Dec 23
9:30 a.m. HST

Recap

New Mexico Lobos 66, BYU Cougars 96
Scoring by half: 38–46, 28–50
Pts: Elijah Brown, Tim Williams 16; Rebs: Tim Williams 8 Asts: Cullen Neal, Elijah Brown 2	Pts: Chase Fischer 41; Rebs: Kyle Davis, Jamal Aytes 6 Asts: Kyle Collinsworth 9

Stan Sheriff Center
Honolulu, Oahu
Attendance: 6,437
Referees: Ken Ditty, Alfred Smith, Todd Apo

=== Northern Iowa ===
Broadcasters: Kanoa Leahey & Cory Alexander
Series History: First Meeting
Starting Lineups:

- BYU: Chase Fischer, Nick Emery, Kyle Collinsworth, Kyle Davis, Nate Austin
- Northern Iowa: Paul Jesperson, Matt Bohannon, Wes Washpun, Jeremy Morgan, Bennett Koch

ESPNU

Dec 25
10:30 a.m. HST

Recap

BYU Cougars 84, Northern Iowa Panthers 76
Scoring by half: 38–28, 46–48
Pts: Chase Fischer 26; Rebs: Kyle Collinsworth 16; Asts: Kyle Collinsworth 6	Pts: Matt Bohannon 21; Rebs: Wes Washpun 8 Asts: Wes Washpun 7

Stan Sheriff Center
Honolulu, Oahu
Attendance: 7,251
Referees: Jason Baker, Tom Short, JB DeRosa

=== Saint Mary's ===
Broadcasters: Roxy Bernstein & Corey Williams
Series History: BYU leads series 11–7
Starting Lineups:

- BYU: Chase Fischer, Nick Emery, Kyle Collinsworth, Kyle Davis, Nate Austin
- Saint Mary's: Emmett Naar, Evan Fitzner, Dane Pineau, Calvin Hermanson, Joe Rahon

ESPNU

Dec 31
8:00 p.m. PST

Recap

BYU Cougars 74, Saint Mary's Gaels 85
Scoring by half: 27–36, 47–49
Pts: Chase Fischer 21; Rebs: Nate Austin 14; Asts: Kyle Collinsworth 6	Pts: Calvin Hermanson 21; Rebs: Evan Fitzner 9 Asts: Emmett Naar, Joe Rahon 6

McKeon Pavilion
Moraga, CA
Attendance: 3,183
Referees: Randy McCall, John Higgins, Mike Reed

=== Pacific ===
Broadcasters: Glen Kuiper & Dan Belluomini
Series History: BYU leads series 6–4
Starting Lineups:

- BYU: Chase Fischer, Nick Emery, Kyle Collinsworth, Kyle Davis, Nate Austin
- Pacific: T.J. Wallace, Alec Kobre, Tonko Vuko, Jacob Lampkin, Ray Bowles

RTUT

Jan 2
3 p.m. PST

Recap

BYU Cougars 81, Pacific Tigers 67
Scoring by half: 34–28, 47–39
Pts: Chase Fischer 23; Rebs: Nate Austin 10; Asts: Kyle Collinsworth 8	Pts: Jacob Lampkin 14; Rebs: T.J. Wallace 6 Asts: Ray Bowles, Ilias Theodorou 5

Alex G. Spanos Center
Stockton, CA
Attendance: 3,175
Referees: Verne Harris, Eric Curry, Michael Greenstein

=== Santa Clara ===
Broadcasters: Roxy Bernstein & Corey Williams
Series History: BYU leads series 24–5
Starting Lineups:

- Santa Clara: Kai Healy, Jared Brownridge, KJ Feagin, Nate Kratch, Emmanuel Ndumanya
- BYU: Chase Fischer, Nick Emery, Kyle Collinsworth, Kyle Davis, Nate Austin

ESPNU

Jan 7
9:05 p.m. MST

Recap

Santa Clara Broncos 61, BYU Cougars 97
Scoring by half: 34–48, 27–49
Pts: Jared Brownridge 16; Rebs: Nate Kratch 8 Asts: KJ Feagin 5	Pts: Nick Emery 23; Rebs: Kyle Collinsworth 11; Asts: Kyle Collinsowrth 10; Collinsworth triple double #9 (21–11–10)

Marriott Center
Provo, UT
Attendance: 12,777
Referees: David Hall, Shawn Lehigh, Nate Harris

=== San Francisco ===
Broadcasters: Dave McCann, Blaine Fowler, & Spencer Linton
Series History: BYU leads series 13–7
Starting Lineups:

- San Francisco: Devin Watson, Uche Ogoegbu, Dont'e Reynolds, Chase Foster, Tim Derksen
- BYU: Chase Fischer, Nick Emery, Kyle Collinsworth, Kyle Davis, Nate Austin

BYUtv

Jan 9
7:05 p.m. MST

Recap

San Francisco Dons 92, BYU Cougars 102
Scoring by half: 45–51, 47–51
Pts: Devin Watson 25; Rebs: Dont'e Reynolds 7 Asts: Devin Watson, Tim Derksen 5	Pts: Chase Fischer 25; Rebs: Kyle Davis 9 Asts: Kyle Collinsworth 7

Marriott Center
Provo, UT
Attendance: 16,616
Referees: Deron White, Tom Spitznagel, Ryan McDaniel

=== Gonzaga ===
Broadcasters: Beth Mowins & Brad Daugherty
Series History: Gonzaga leads series 8–5
Starting Lineups:

- BYU: Chase Fischer, Nick Emery, Kyle Collinsworth, Kyle Davis, Nate Austin
- Gonzaga: Bryan Alberts, Domantas Sabonis, Josh Perkins, Eric McClellan, Kyle Wiltjer

ESPN2

Jan 14
6 p.m. PST

Recap

BYU Cougars 69, Gonzaga Bulldogs 68
Scoring by half: 32–36, 37–32
Pts: Kyle Collinsworth 20; Rebs: Kyle Davis 11; Asts: Chase Fischer 4	Pts: Kyle Wiltjer 35; Rebs: Kyle Wiltjer 10; Asts: Josh Perkins 7

McCarthey Athletic Center
Spokane, WA
Attendance: 6,000
Referees: Verne Harris, John Higgins, Michael Irving

=== Portland ===
Broadcasters: Tom Glasgow & Francis Williams
Series History: BYU leads series 13–1
Starting Lineups:

- BYU: Chase Fischer, Nick Emery, Kyle Collinsworth, Kyle Davis, Nate Austin
- Portland: Bryce Pressley, Alex Wintering, Jason Todd, Gabe Taylor, Ray Barreno

RTUT

Jan 16
3 p.m. PST

Recap

BYU Cougars 81, Portland Pilots 84
Scoring by half: 40–42, 41–42
Pts: Chase Fischer 22; Rebs: Nate Austin 11; Asts: Kyle Collinsworth 6	Pts: Alec Wintering 22; Rebs: Ray Barreno 8 Asts: Alex Wintering 5

Chiles Center
Portland, OR
Attendance: 4,852
Referees: Chris Rastatter, Ruben Ramos, Nate Harris

=== Loyola Marymount ===
Broadcasters: Dave McCann & Brad Holland
Series History: BYU leads series 8–4
Starting Lineups:

- BYU: Chase Fischer, Nick Emery, Kyle Collinsworth, Kyle Davis, Nate Austin
- LMU: Adom Jacko, Brandon Brown, Steven Haney, Buay Tuach, Shamar Johnson

RTUT
BYUtv

Jan 21
8 p.m. PST

Recap

BYU Cougars 91, LMU Lions 80
Scoring by half: 40–50, 51–30
Pts: Nick Emery 24; Rebs: Kyle Collinsworth, Kyle Davis 13; Asts: Kyle Collinsworth 15; Collinsworth triple double #10 (10–13–15)	Pts: Adom Jacko 26; Rebs: Adom Jacko 12; Asts: Brandon Brown 10

Gersten Pavilion
Los Angeles, CA
Attendance: 2,681
Referees: Bob Staffen, Dick Cartmell, Kelly Self

=== Pepperdine ===
Broadcasters: Dave McCann & Brad Holland
Series History: BYU leads series 9–7
Starting Lineups:

- BYU: Chase Fischer, Nick Emery, Kyle Collinsworth, Kyle Davis, Nate Austin
- Pepperdine: Jeremy Major, Stacy Davis, Kameron Edwards, Lamond Murray Jr., Jett Raines

BYUtv

Jan 23
5 p.m. PST

Recap

BYU Cougars 65, Pepperdine Waves 71
Scoring by half: 28–30, 37–41
Pts: Kyle Collinsworth 18; Rebs: Nate Austin 11; Asts: Kyle Collinsworth, Kyle Davis 3	Pts: Lamond Murray Jr. 20; Rebs: Stacy Davis, Kameron Edwards 9 Asts: Amadi Udenyi 9

Firestone Fieldhouse
Malibu, CA
Attendance: 3,019
Referees: Gregory Nixon, Horace Shields, Dennis Flannery

=== Loyola Marymount ===
Broadcasters: Roxy Bernstein & Corey Williams
Series History: BYU leads series 9–4
Starting Lineups:

- LMU: Adom Jacko, Brandon Brown, Steven Haney, Shamar Johnson, David Humphries
- BYU: Chase Fischer, Nick Emery, Kyle Collinsworth, Kyle Davis, Nate Austin

ESPNU

Jan 28
9:05 p.m. MST

Recap

LMU Lions 62, BYU Cougars 87
Scoring by half: 24–38, 38–49
Pts: Adom Jacko 20; Rebs: David Humphries 8 Asts: Brandon Brown 4	Pts: Kyle Davis 19; Rebs: Jordan Chatman, Nate Austin 7 Asts: Kyle Collinworth 8

Marriott Center
Provo, UT
Attendance: 12,816
Referees: Verne Harris, Shawn Lehigh, Tom O'Neill

=== Pepperdine ===
Broadcasters: Beth Mowins & Brad Daugherty
Series History: BYU leads series 9–8
Starting Lineups:

- Pepperdine: Jeremy Major, Stacy Davis, Kameron Edwards, Lamond Murray Jr., Jett Raines
- BYU: Chase Fischer, Nick Emery, Kyle Collinsworth, Kyle Davis, Nate Austin

ESPN2

Jan 30
8:05 p.m. MST

Recap

Pepperdine Waves 77, BYU Cougars 88
Scoring by half: 45–53, 32–35
Pts: Jett Raines 17; Rebs: Stacy Davis 9 Asts: Jeremy Major 4	Pts: Kyle Collinsworth 24; Rebs: Kyle Davis 8 Asts: Kyle Collinsworth 10

Marriott Center
Provo, UT
Attendance: 18,987
Referees: Michael Greenstein, Jimmy Casas, Kelly Pfeifer

=== Saint Mary's ===
Broadcasters: Dave McCann, Blaine Fowler, & Spencer Linton
Series History: BYU leads series 11–8
Starting Lineups:

- Saint Mary's: Emmett Naar, Evan Fitzner, Dane Pineau, Calvin Hermanson, Joe Rahon
- BYU: Chase Fischer, Nick Emery, Kyle Collinsworth, Jakob Hartsock, Kyle Davis

BYUtv

Feb 4
7:05 p.m. MST

Recap

Saint Mary's Gaels 59, BYU Cougars 70
Scoring by half: 37–33, 22–37
Pts: Joe Rahon 17; Rebs: Dane Pineau 6 Asts: Joe Rahon 5	Pts: Chase Fischer 19; Rebs: Kyle Collinsworth 9 Asts: Kyle Collinsworth 7

Marriott Center
Provo, UT
Attendance: 14,897
Referees: Tony Padilla, John Higgins, Kelly Self

=== Pacific ===
Broadcasters: Dave McCann, Blaine Fowler, & Spencer Linton
Series History: BYU leads series 7–4
Starting Lineups:

- Pacific: T.J. Wallace, Alec Kobre, Tonko Vuko, Eric Thompson, Ray Bowles
- BYU: Chase Fischer, Nick Emery, Kyle Collinsworth, Jackob Hartsock, Kyle Davis

BYUtv
RTUT

Feb 6
2:05 p.m. MST

Recap

Pacific Tigers 77, BYU Cougars 72
Scoring by half: 32–34, 45–38
Pts: Alec Kobre 17; Rebs: Eric Thompson 8 Asts: T.J. Wallace 3	Pts: Chase Fischer 23; Rebs: Kyle Collinsworth 12; Asts: Kyle Collinsworth 4

Marriott Center
Provo, UT
Attendance: 16,069
Referees: Dick Cartmell, Michael Irving, Nate Harris

=== San Francisco ===
Broadcasters: Dave McCann & Blaine Fowler
Series History: BYU leads series 14–7
Starting Lineups:

- BYU: Chase Fischer, Nick Emery, Kyle Collinsworth, Kyle Davis, Corbin Kaufusi
- San Francisco: Devin Watson, Uche Ogoegbu, Ronnie Boyce, Dont'e Reynolds, Tim Derksen

BYUtv

Feb 11
7 p.m. PST

Recap

BYU Cougars 114, San Francisco Dons 89
Scoring by half: 58–39, 56–50
Pts: Nick Emery 37; Rebs: Corbin Kaufusi 10; Asts: Kyle Collinsworth 8	Pts: Devin Watson 29; Rebs: Dont'e Reynolds 10; Asts: Devin Watson 7

War Memorial Gymnasium
San Francisco, CA
Attendance: 1,420
Referees: Randy McCall, Larry Spauding, Bill Vinovich

=== Santa Clara ===
Broadcasters: Dave McCann & Blaine Fowler
Series History: BYU leads series 25–5
Starting Lineups:

- BYU: Chase Fischer, Nick Emery, Kyle Collinsworth, Kyle Davis, Corbin Kaufusi
- Santa Clara: Kai Healy, Jared Brownridge, KJ Feagin, Nate Kratch, Emmanuel Ndumanya

BYUtv
RTUT

Feb 13
1 p.m. PST

Recap

BYU Cougars 96, Santa Clara Broncos 62
Scoring by half: 51–32, 45–30
Pts: Nick Emery 31; Rebs: Kyle Davis 8 Asts: Kyle Collinsworth 8	Pts: Jared Brownridge 16; Rebs: Emmanuel Ndumanya 10; Asts: Kai Healy, Jared Brownridge, Matt Hubbard 2

Leavey Center
Santa Clara, CA
Attendance: 2,469
Referees: Michael Scyphers, Ruben Ramos, Deldre Carr

=== San Diego ===
Broadcasters: Roxy Bernstein & Corey Williams
Series History: BYU leads series 9–3
Starting Lineups:

- BYU: Chase Fischer, Nick Emery, Kyle Collinsworth, Kyle Davis, Corbin Kaufusi
- USD: Olin Carter III, Vasa Pusica, Marcus Harris, Brett Bailey, Jito Kok

ESPNU

Feb 18
8:05 p.m. PST

Recap

BYU Cougars 69, San Diego Toreros 67
Scoring by half: 27–32, 42–35
Pts: Kyle Collinsworth 25; Rebs: Kyle Collinsworth 12; Asts: Kyle Collinsworth 6	Pts: Vasa Pusica 17; Rebs: Duda Sanadze 7 Asts: Duda Sanadze 5

Jenny Craig Pavilion
San Diego, CA
Attendance: 3,056
Referees: Gregory Nixon, Tony Padilla, Klaus Endrissat

=== San Diego ===
Broadcasters: Dave McCann, Blaine Fowler, & Spencer Linton
Series History: BYU leads series 10–3
Starting Lineups:

- USD: Olin Carter III, Vasa Pusica, Marcus Harris, Brett Bailey, Jito Kok
- BYU: Chase Fischer, Nick Emery, Kyle Collinsworth, Kyle Davis, Corbin Kaufusi

BYUtv

Feb 20
7:05 p.m. MST

Recap

San Diego Toreros 33, BYU Cougars 91
Scoring by half: 11–39, 22–52
Pts: Brett Bailey 9 Rebs: Duda Sanadze 4 Asts: Vasa Pusica, Brett Bailey, Jito Kok, Duda Sanadze, Cameron Neubauer, 1	Pts: Nick Emery 17; Rebs: Nick Emery 9 Asts: Nick Emery 5

Marriott Center
Provo, UT
Attendance: 16,324
Referees: Randy McCall, Glen Mayberry, Steve Olson

=== Portland ===
Broadcasters: Roxy Bernstein & Corey Williams
Series History: BYU leads series 13–2
Starting Lineups:

- Portland: Bryce Pressley, Alex Wintering, D'Marques Tyson, Gabe Taylor, Ray Barreno
- BYU: Chase Fischer, Nick Emery, Kyle Collinsworth, Kyle Davis, Corbin Kaufusi

ESPNU

Feb 25
9:05 p.m. MST

Recap

Portland Pilots 81, BYU Cougars 99
Scoring by half: 32–53, 49–46
Pts: Jazz Johnson 17; Rebs: Ray Barreno 11; Asts: Bryce Pressley, Alex Wintering 6	Pts: Chase Fischer 21; Rebs: Kyle Collinsworth 11; Asts: Kyle Collinsworth 10; Collinsworth triple-double #11

Marriott Center
Provo, UT
Attendance: 13,497
Referees: Bob Staffen, Deron White, Brent Meaux

=== Gonzaga ===
Broadcasters: Beth Mowins & Brad Daugherty
Series History: Gonzaga leads series 8–6
Starting Lineups:

- Gonzaga: Kyle Dranginis, Domantas Sabonis, Josh Perkins, Eric McClellan, Kyle Witljer
- BYU: Chase Fischer, Nick Emery, Kyle Collinsworth, Kyle Davis, Corbin Kaufusi

ESPN2

Feb 27
6:05 p.m. MST

Gonzaga Bulldogs 71, BYU Cougars 68
Scoring by half: 38–34, 33–34
Pts: Kyle Wiltjer 21; Rebs: Domantas Sabonis 14; Asts: Josh Perkins 5	Pts: Chase Fischer 18; Rebs: Kyle Collinsworth 15; Asts: Kyle Collinsworth 5

Marriott Center
Provo, UT
Attendance: 18,987
Referees: David Hall, Larry Spaulding, Michael Greenstein

=== Santa Clara ===
Broadcasters: Dave McCann & Blaine Fowler (BYUtv)
Steve Quis, Casey Jacobsen, & Kelli Tennant (TheW.tv)
Series History: BYU leads series 26–5
Starting Lineups:

- Santa Clara: Kai Healy, Jared Brownridge, KJ Feagin, Nate Kratch, Emmanuel Ndumanya
- BYU: Chase Fischer, Nick Emery, Kyle Collinsworth, Kyle Davis, Corbin Kaufusi

BYUtv
TheW.tv

Mar 5
1 p.m. PST

Santa Clara Broncos 60, BYU Cougars 72
Scoring by half: 25–35, 35–37
Pts: Jared Brownridge 30; Rebs: Jarvis Pugh 8 Asts: Kai Healy, KJ Feagin, Matt Hauser 2	Pts: Nick Emery 15; Rebs: Kyle Collinsworth 9 Asts: Kyle Collinsworth 6

Orleans Arena
Paradise, NV
Attendance: 7,341
Referees: Ken Ditty, Mark Cook, Ron Brokenbrough

=== Gonzaga ===
Broadcasters: Brent Musburger & Fran Fraschilla
Series History: Gonzaga leads series 9–6
Starting Lineups:

- BYU: Chase Fischer, Nick Emery, Kyle Collinsworth, Kyle Davis, Corbin Kaufusi
- Gonzaga: Kyle Dranginis, Domantas Sabonis, Josh Perkins, Eric McClellan, Kyle Wiltjer

ESPN2

Mar 7
8:30 p.m. PST

Recap

#3 BYU Cougars 84, #2 Gonzaga Bulldogs 88
Scoring by half: 47–47, 37–41
Pts: Nick Emery 27; Rebs: Kyle Collinsworth 11; Asts: Kyle Collinsworth 6	Pts: Kyle Wiltjer 29; Rebs: Domantas Sabonis 14; Asts: Josh Perkins 5

Orleans Arena
Paradise, NV
Attendance: 8,362
Referees: Randy McCall, Verne Harris, Dick Cartmell

=== UAB ===
Broadcasters: Mitch Holthus & Corey Williams
Series History: BYU leads series 2–1
Starting Lineups:

- UAB: Hakeem Baxter, Nick Norton, Chris Cokley, Robert Brown, William Lee
- BYU: Chase Fischer, Nick Emery, Kyle Collinsworth, Kyle Davis, Corbin Kaufusi

ESPNU

Mar 16
8:05 p.m. MDT

Recap

#7 UAB Blazers 79, #2 BYU Cougars 97
Scoring by half: 30–51, 49–46
Pts: Robert Brown 29; Rebs: Chris Cokley 7 Asts: Tosin Mehenti, Lewis Sullivan 3	Pts: Chase Fischer 27; Rebs: Kyle Collinsworth 10; Asts: Kyle Collinsworth 12; Collinsworth triple-double #12

Marriott Center
Provo, UT
Attendance: 8,420
Referees: Randy McCall, Robert Lehigh, Deron White

=== Virginia Tech ===
Broadcasters: Mitch Holthus & Corey Williams
Series History: BYU leads series 3–0
Starting Lineups:

- Virginia Tech: Shane Henry, Justin Robinson, Justin Bibbs, Jalen Hudson, Zach Leday
- BYU: Chase Fischer, Nick Emery, Kyle Collinsworth, Kyle Davis, Corbin Kaufusi

ESPNU

Mar 18
7:35 p.m. MDT

Recap

#3 Virginia Tech Hokies 77, #2 BYU Cougars 80
Scoring by half: 34–38, 43–42
Pts: Seth Allen 22; Rebs: Zach Leday 14; Asts: Seth Allen, Justin Robinson 3	Pts: Chase Fischer 24; Rebs: Kyle Davis 8 Asts: Kyle Collinsworth 10

Marriott Center
Provo, UT
Attendance: 12,379
Referees: Larry Spaudling, Rick Batsell, Frank Harvey

=== Creighton ===
Broadcasters: Roxy Bernstein & Fran Fraschilla
Series History: BYU leads series 6–3
Starting Lineups:

- Creighton: Khyri Thomas, Maurice Watson Jr., Cole Huff, James Milliken, Geoffrey Groselle
- BYU: Chase Fischer, Zac Seljaas, Nick Emery, Kyle Davis, Corbin Kaufusi

ESPN

Mar 22
7:05 p.m. MDT

Recap

#4 Creighton Bluejays 82, #2 BYU Cougars 88
Scoring by half: 37–38, 45–50
Pts: Geoffrey Groselle 22; Rebs: Cole Huff 11; Asts: Maurice Watson Jr. 9	Pts: Zac Seljaas 19; Rebs: Zac Seljaas, Nick Emery 7 Asts: Nick Emery 5

Marriott Center
Provo, UT
Attendance: 15,525
Referees: Verne Harris, Don Daily, Keith Kimble

=== Valparaiso ===
Broadcasters: Bob Wischusen, Fran Fraschilla, & Kaylee Hartung (ESPN)
Scott Graham & Kelly Tripucka (Westwood One)
Series History: Series even 1–1
Starting Lineups:

- BYU: Chase Fischer, Nick Emery, Kyle Collinsworth, Kyle Davis, Corbin Kaufusi
- Valparaiso: Keith Carter, Darien Walker, Shane Hammink, Vashil Hernandez, Alec Peters

ESPN
Westwood One

Mar 29
7 p.m. EDT

#2 BYU Cougars 70, #1 Valparaiso Crusaders 72
Scoring by half: 30–44, 40–28
Pts: Kyle Collinsworth 20; Rebs: Kyle Davis, Corbin Kaufusi 8 Asts: Kyle Collinsworth 5	Pts: David Skara, Alec Peters 15; Rebs: Alec Peters 9 Asts: Shane Hammink 5

Madison Square Garden
New York City, NY
Attendance: 8,298
Referees: Pat Driscoll, John Gaffney, Brian O'Connell
