= 2008 Mountain West Conference men's basketball tournament =

- Classification: Division I
- Season: 2007–08
- Teams: 9
- Site: Thomas & Mack Center; Paradise, Nevada, NV
- Champions: UNLV (3rd title)
- Winning coach: Lon Kruger (2nd title)
- MVP: Wink Adams (UNLV)
- Television: MountainWest Sports Network, CSTV, Versus

2007–08 Mountain West Conference men's basketball standings
	Conf.				Overall
Team	W		L	PCT	W		L	PCT
BYU	14	–	2	.875	27	–	8	.771
UNLV †	12	–	4	.750	27	–	8	.771
New Mexico	11	–	5	.688	24	–	9	.727
San Diego State	9	–	7	.563	20	–	13	.606
Air Force	8	–	8	.500	16	–	14	.533
Utah	7	–	9	.438	18	–	15	.545
TCU	6	–	10	.375	14	–	16	.467
Wyoming	5	–	11	.313	12	–	18	.400
Colorado State	0	–	16	.000	7	–	25	.219
† 2008 Mountain West tournament winner Rankings from AP Poll

The 2008 Mountain West Conference men's basketball tournament was played at the Thomas & Mack Center in Las Vegas, Nevada from March 12–15, 2008. The tournament was sponsored by Phillips 66 and all first round, quarterfinal, and semifinal games were broadcast live on the MountainWest Sports Network and CBS College Sports Network, while the championship game was broadcast on Versus.

For the second straight year, tournament host UNLV defeated regular season league champion BYU 76–61 to win the Mountain West Conference tournament championship and earn the league's automatic bid to the NCAA Tournament.

== Regular season ==
BYU entered the tournament as the first team in Mountain West history to win back-to-back regular season titles.

Standings
		Conf		Overall		Post-tournament play	
Seed	School	W	L	W	L	Tournament	Eliminated
1	BYU*	14	2	25	6	NCAA	1st round
2	UNLV	12	4	23	7	NCAA	2nd round
3	New Mexico	11	5	24	7	NIT	1st round
4	San Diego State	9	7	19	11	NIT	1st round
5	Air Force	8	8	16	13		
6	Utah	7	9	16	13	CBI	2nd round
7	Texas Christian	6	10	14	15		
8	Wyoming	5	11	12	17		
9	Colorado State	0	16	6	24		

* Denotes regular season champion.

== Tournament bracket ==
First round (March 12)
8	Wyoming	63
9	Colorado St.	68

Quarterfinals (March 13)
1	#24 BYU	89
9	Colorado St.	62
4	San Diego St.	53
5	Air Force	49
3	New Mexico	80
6	Utah	82*
2	UNLV	89
7	TCU	88

Semifinals (March 14)
1	#24 BYU	63
4	San Diego St.	54
6	Utah	55
2	UNLV	61

Championship (March 15)
1	#24 BYU	61
2	UNLV	76

Note: Asterisk (*) denotes game ended in overtime.

== Games ==
=== First round ===
==== Colorado St. vs. Wyoming ====
Before the game, Wyoming held the lead in all-time matchups against Colorado State, 125–83, and had won every matchup this season. It was the third meeting of the two teams in MWC Tournament play. The Rams are now 7–7 in Mountain West tournament history, while the Cowboys are 6–9. 9th seed Colorado State entered the contest with 8th seed Wyoming having gone 0–16 in conference play during the regular season, but stunned Wyoming with a 68–63 win during the first round game of the tournament. Junior Marcus Walker led the Rams with 22 points followed by true Freshman Andre McFarland with 18. Wyoming received 29 points from Junior Brandon Ewing, 19 of which were in the first half. Colorado St. went on to play top seed BYU.

=== Quarterfinals ===
==== BYU vs. Colorado St. ====
Colorado St. kept it close through the first half by shooting threes, but BYU took off early in the second half. BYU shot over 70% in the second half. BYU's Lee Cummard was the player of the game.

==== San Diego St. vs. Air Force ====
Lorrenzo Wade sank four free throws and grabbed a critical rebound in the final seven seconds, allowing San Diego State to edge Air Force 53–49.

==== UNLV vs. TCU ====
UNLV answered TCU's record onslaught of 3-pointers with a three-point play by Wink Adams in the closing seconds that gave the Runnin' Rebels an 89–88 win over the Horned Frogs.

==== Utah vs. New Mexico ====
Luke Nevill made all the plays down the stretch despite playing with four fouls over the final 11½ minutes and the Utah Utes put a crimp in New Mexico's NCAA plans with an 82–80 overtime victory over the Lobos. New Mexico's J.R. Giddens missed a potential game tying lay-up as the clock expired in overtime.

=== Semifinals ===
==== BYU vs. San Diego St. ====
Lee Cummard's 20 points led 24th-ranked BYU past pesky San Diego State 63–54, sending the Cougars to the championship for the second straight year.

==== UNLV vs. Utah ====
Wink Adams and Curtis Terry each scored 20 points, leading UNLV back into the Mountain West Conference championship with a 61–55 win over Utah.

=== Finals ===
==== UNLV vs. BYU ====
In a rematch of the 2007 MWC Championship game, the second-seed UNLV Runnin' Rebels challenged the top-seed and nationally ranked BYU Cougars. The two teams split the regular season series in blowouts. UNLV defeated BYU 76–61 to win their second straight conference championship and their third overall. BYU led at halftime, but the Runnin' Rebels produced a slaughter in the second half. UNLV's junior guard Wink Adams was named the Tournament MVP after scoring 23 points, 14 of which came in the final 7 minutes of the game and senior Curtis Terry added 20 points for the Rebels. BYU was led by freshman guard Jimmer Fredette, who had 17 points.
