= 2007–08 UNLV Runnin' Rebels basketball team =

American college basketball season

2007–08 UNLV Runnin' Rebels basketball

MWC tournament champions

NCAA tournament, second round
- Conference: Mountain West Conference
- Record: 27–8 (12–4 Mountain West)
- Head coach: Lon Kruger
- Assistant coaches: Greg Grensing; Steve Henson; Lew Hill
- Home arena: Thomas & Mack Center

2007–08 Mountain West Conference men's basketball standings
	Conf.				Overall
Team	W		L	PCT	W		L	PCT
BYU	14	–	2	.875	27	–	8	.771
UNLV †	12	–	4	.750	27	–	8	.771
New Mexico	11	–	5	.688	24	–	9	.727
San Diego State	9	–	7	.563	20	–	13	.606
Air Force	8	–	8	.500	16	–	14	.533
Utah	7	–	9	.438	18	–	15	.545
TCU	6	–	10	.375	14	–	16	.467
Wyoming	5	–	11	.313	12	–	18	.400
Colorado State	0	–	16	.000	7	–	25	.219
† 2008 Mountain West tournament winner Rankings from AP Poll

The 2007–08 UNLV Runnin' Rebels basketball team represented the University of Nevada, Las Vegas. The team was coached by Lon Kruger, returning for his fourth year with the Runnin' Rebels. They played their home games at the Thomas & Mack Center on UNLV's main campus in Paradise, Nevada and were a member of the Mountain West Conference. The Runnin' Rebels finished the season 27–8, 12–4 in MWC play. They won the 2008 Mountain West Conference men's basketball tournament to receive an automatic bid to the 2008 NCAA Division I men's basketball tournament, earning an 8 seed in the Midwest Region. The Runnin' Rebels defeated 9 seed Kent State in the opening round before losing to 1 seed and eventual National champion Kansas in the second round.

== Roster ==
2007–08 UNLV Rebels men's basketball team
Players
Coaches

Pos.	#	Name	Height	Weight	Year	Previous school	Hometown
G	1	Wink Adams	6 ft 0 in (1.83 m)	195 lb (88 kg)	Jr	Gulf Shores Academy	Houston, Texas
G	24	René Rougeau	6 ft 6 in (1.98 m)	205 lb (93 kg)	Jr	Etiwanda	Rancho Cucamonga, California
G	33	Tre'Von Willis	6 ft 4 in (1.93 m)	—	So		Fresno, California
F	45	Joe Darger	6 ft 7 in (2.01 m)	225 lb (102 kg)	Jr	Riverton	Riverton, Utah

Head coach

- Lon Kruger

Assistant coach(es)

- Greg Grensing
- Steve Henson
- Lew Hill

Legend

- (C) Team captain
- (S) Suspended
- (I) Ineligible
- (W) Walk-on
- Injured
- Current redshirt

Roster

== Schedule and results ==
Date time, TV	Rank^{#}	Opponent^{#}	Result	Record	Site (attendance) city, state
Regular season
Nov 9, 2007*		Montana State	W 76–65	1–0	Thomas & Mack Center (10,013); Paradise, Nevada
Nov 13, 2007*		Dixie State	W 97–66	2–0	Thomas & Mack Center (8,034); Paradise, Nevada
Nov 17, 2007*		at San Diego	W 66–55	3–0	Jenny Craig Pavilion (2,853); San Diego, California
Nov 21, 2007*		No. 6 Louisville	L 48–68	3–1	Thomas & Mack Center (14,133); Paradise, Nevada
Nov 24, 2007*		Nevada	W 79–67	4–1	Thomas & Mack Center (13,068); Paradise, Nevada
Nov 27, 2007*		at UC Santa Barbara	L 60–63	4–2	The Thunderdome (3,438); Santa Barbara, California
Dec 1, 2007*		UTEP	W 84–71	5–2	Thomas & Mack Center (10,766); Paradise, Nevada
Dec 5, 2007*		at Northern Arizona	W 83–74	6–2	Walkup Skydome (2,138); Flagstaff, Arizona
Dec 8, 2007*		Fresno State	W 84–71	7–2	Thomas & Mack Center (4,924); Paradise, Nevada
Dec 19, 2007*; CSTV		No. 19 Arizona	L 49–52	7–3	Thomas & Mack Center (13,676); Paradise, Nevada
Dec 22, 2007*		Tennessee-Martin	W 74–48	8–3	Thomas & Mack Center (7,899); Paradise, Nevada
Dec 28, 2007*		Kennesaw State	W 78–55	9–3	Thomas & Mack Center (10,103); Paradise, Nevada
Dec 29, 2007*		Nicholls State	W 64–42	10–3	Thomas & Mack Center (10,317); Paradise, Nevada
Dec 30, 2007*		Minnesota	W 81–64	11–3	Thomas & Mack Center (11,615); Paradise, Nevada
Jan 5, 2008		at Colorado State	W 65–62	12–3 (1–0)	Moby Arena (4,023); Fort Collins, Colorado
Jan 12, 2008		at Air Force	L 53–65	12–4 (1–1)	Clune Arena (5,146); Colorado Springs, Colorado
Jan 15, 2008		BYU	W 70–41	13–4 (2–1)	Thomas & Mack Center (13,074); Paradise, Nevada
Jan 23, 2008		Wyoming	W 78–71	14–4 (3–1)	Thomas & Mack Center (10,082); Paradise, Nevada
Jan 26, 2008		at San Diego State	W 72–69	15–4 (4–1)	Viejas Arena (9,131); San Diego, California
Jan 30, 2008		at TCU	W 70–58	16–4 (5–1)	Daniel-Meyer Coliseum (3,577); Fort Worth, Texas
Feb 2, 2008		New Mexico	W 79–60	17–4 (6–1)	Thomas & Mack Center (14,056); Paradise, Nevada
Feb 6, 2008		at Utah	L 73–81	17–5 (6–2)	Jon M. Huntsman Center (9,989); Salt Lake City, Utah
Feb 9, 2008		Colorado State	W 68–51	18–5 (7–2)	Thomas & Mack Center (12,946); Paradise, Nevada
Feb 12, 2008		Air Force	W 58–51	19–5 (8–2)	Thomas & Mack Center (10,506); Paradise, Nevada
Feb 16, 2008		at BYU	L 48–74	19–6 (8–3)	Marriott Center (22,580); Provo, Utah
Feb 23, 2008		at Wyoming	W 73–65	20–6 (9–3)	Arena-Auditorium (5,547); Laramie, Wyoming
Feb 26, 2008		San Diego State	W 68–58	21–6 (10–3)	Thomas & Mack Center (13,036); Paradise, Nevada
Mar 1, 2008		TCU	W 74–55	22–6 (11–3)	Thomas & Mack Center (12,615); Paradise, Nevada
Mar 4, 2008		at New Mexico	L 45–59	22–7 (11–4)	The Pit (18,018); Albuquerque, New Mexico
Mar 8, 2008		Utah	W 70–63	23–7 (12–4)	Thomas & Mack Center (12,366); Paradise, Nevada
MWC tournament
Mar 13, 2008*		TCU; Quarterfinals	W 89–88	24–7	Thomas & Mack Center (10,857); Paradise, Nevada
Mar 14, 2008*		Utah; Semifinals	W 61–55	25–7	Thomas & Mack Center (13,913); Paradise, Nevada
Mar 15, 2008*		No. 24 BYU; Championship Game	W 76–61	26–7	Thomas & Mack Center (16,096); Paradise, Nevada
NCAA tournament
Mar 20, 2008*	(8 MW)	vs. (9 MW) Kent State; First Round	W 71–58	27–7	Qwest Center Omaha (17,162); Omaha, Nebraska
Mar 22, 2008*; CBS	(8 MW)	vs. (1 MW) No. 4 Kansas; Second Round	L 56–75	27–8	Qwest Center Omaha (17,162); Omaha, Nebraska
*Non-conference game. ^{#}Rankings from AP poll/Coaches' Poll. (#) Tournament seedings in parentheses. MW=Midwest. All times are in Pacific Time.
