= Dave Rose (basketball) =

American basketball player-coach

Biographical details
- Born: December 19, 1957 (age 68); Houston, Texas, U.S.

Playing career
- 1976–1977: Dixie (UT)
- 1979–1980: Dixie (UT)
- 1980–1983: Houston

Coaching career (HC unless noted)
- 1983–1986: Millard HS (UT)
- 1986–1987: Pine View HS (UT) (assistant)
- 1987–1990: Dixie (UT) (assistant)
- 1990–1997: Dixie (UT)
- 1997–2005: BYU (assistant)
- 2005–2019: BYU

Head coaching record
- Overall: 348–135 (.720) (college)
- Tournaments: 4–8 (NCAA Division I); 6–5 (NIT)

Accomplishments and honors

Championships
- 4 MWC regular season (2007–2009, 2011)

Awards
- SWAC Coach of the Year (1993); 3× MWC Coach of the Year (2006, 2007, 2011); USBWA Most Courageous Award (2010)

David Jack Rose (born December 19, 1957) is an American college basketball coach who recently served as the head coach at Brigham Young University. He played two years at Dixie College and later became a coach there. Rose then became co-captain of Phi Slama Jama, the University of Houston's college basketball squad featuring Clyde Drexler and Hakeem Olajuwon that finished as the national runner-up in the 1983 NCAA Division I men's basketball tournament.

== Career ==
Rose was named the head basketball coach at BYU in 2005, replacing Steve Cleveland and began the first of eleven straight 20-win seasons in 2005–06. Rose inherited a 9–21 team and immediately posted a 20–9 record, the second best turnaround in college basketball in 2005–06. Rose recruited Jimmer Fredette in 2007, who was selected by all awards as National Player of the Year. In 2010, Rose coached BYU to their first NCAA tournament victory in 17 years in a double-overtime win against the University of Florida. In 2011, Rose's team shared the regular season Mountain West title with San Diego State and advanced to the Sweet Sixteen in the NCAA tournament, BYU's first appearance in that round in 30 years.

In April 2011, Rose signed a five-year head coaching contract extension with BYU. In 2011–12, Rose coached the team in their first season as members of the West Coast Conference. Rose coached the Cougars to their 6th straight NCAA tournament appearance. Participating in the First Four round, the Cougars made the largest comeback in NCAA Tournament history, beating Iona 78–72 after previously trailing by 25. On January 19, 2013, Rose won his 200th game as a Division I coach, in a game against San Diego. He won his 300th game as a Division I coach on February 4, 2017, in a BYU win against Portland. Rose retired from coaching BYU's men's basketball team on March 26, 2019.

Shortly before the start of what would be Rose's last season, the Cougars were stripped of all 47 wins over the 2015–16 and 2016–17 seasons after guard Nick Emery was retroactively declared ineligible for receiving impermissible benefits from boosters. Even with the vacated games, Rose is still the second-winningest coach in school history, behind only Stan Watts.

== Personal life ==
Rose and his wife, Cheryl, are the parents of three children. Rose served a full-time mission for the Church of Jesus Christ of Latter-day Saints in Manchester, England from 1977 to 1979. In June 2009, he was diagnosed with pancreatic cancer and returned to coaching later that year. In October 2019, shortly after his retirement, Rose suffered a severe heart attack. In January 2021, Rose suffered a stroke.

His sister-in-law is Whitney Rose, a cast member on The Real Housewives of Salt Lake City.

== Head coaching record ==
=== College ===
Record table
Season	Team	Overall	Conference	Standing	Postseason
BYU Cougars (Mountain West Conference) (2005–2011)
2005–06	BYU	20–9	12–4	T–2nd	NIT First Round
2006–07	BYU	25–9	13–3	1st	NCAA Division I Round of 64
2007–08	BYU	27–8	14–2	1st	NCAA Division I Round of 64
2008–09	BYU	25–8	12–4	T–1st	NCAA Division I Round of 64
2009–10	BYU	30–6	13–3	2nd	NCAA Division I Round of 32
2010–11	BYU	32–5	14–2	T–1st	NCAA Division I Sweet 16
BYU Cougars (West Coast Conference) (2011–2019)
2011–12	BYU	26–9	12–4	3rd	NCAA Division I Round of 64
2012–13	BYU	24–12	10–6	3rd	NIT Semifinal
2013–14	BYU	23–12	13–5	2nd	NCAA Division I Round of 64
2014–15	BYU	25–10	13–5	2nd	NCAA Division I First Four
2015–16	BYU	26–11*	13–5*	3rd	NIT Semifinal
2016–17	BYU	22–12*	12–6*	3rd	NIT First Round
2017–18	BYU	24–11	11–7	3rd	NIT First Round
2018–19	BYU	19–13	11–5	T–2nd	
BYU:		348–135 (.720)	173–61 (.739)		
Total:		348–135 (.720)			
National champion Postseason invitational champion Conference regular season champion Conference regular season and conference tournament champion Division regular season champion Division regular season and conference tournament champion Conference tournament champion

*Includes 47 vacated wins, 25 of which were conference wins. Under official NCAA records, Rose's career record is 301–135. At BYU, Rose's official record is 301–135 (148–61 in conference play)
