= Kevin Kruger =

American basketball coach (born 1983)

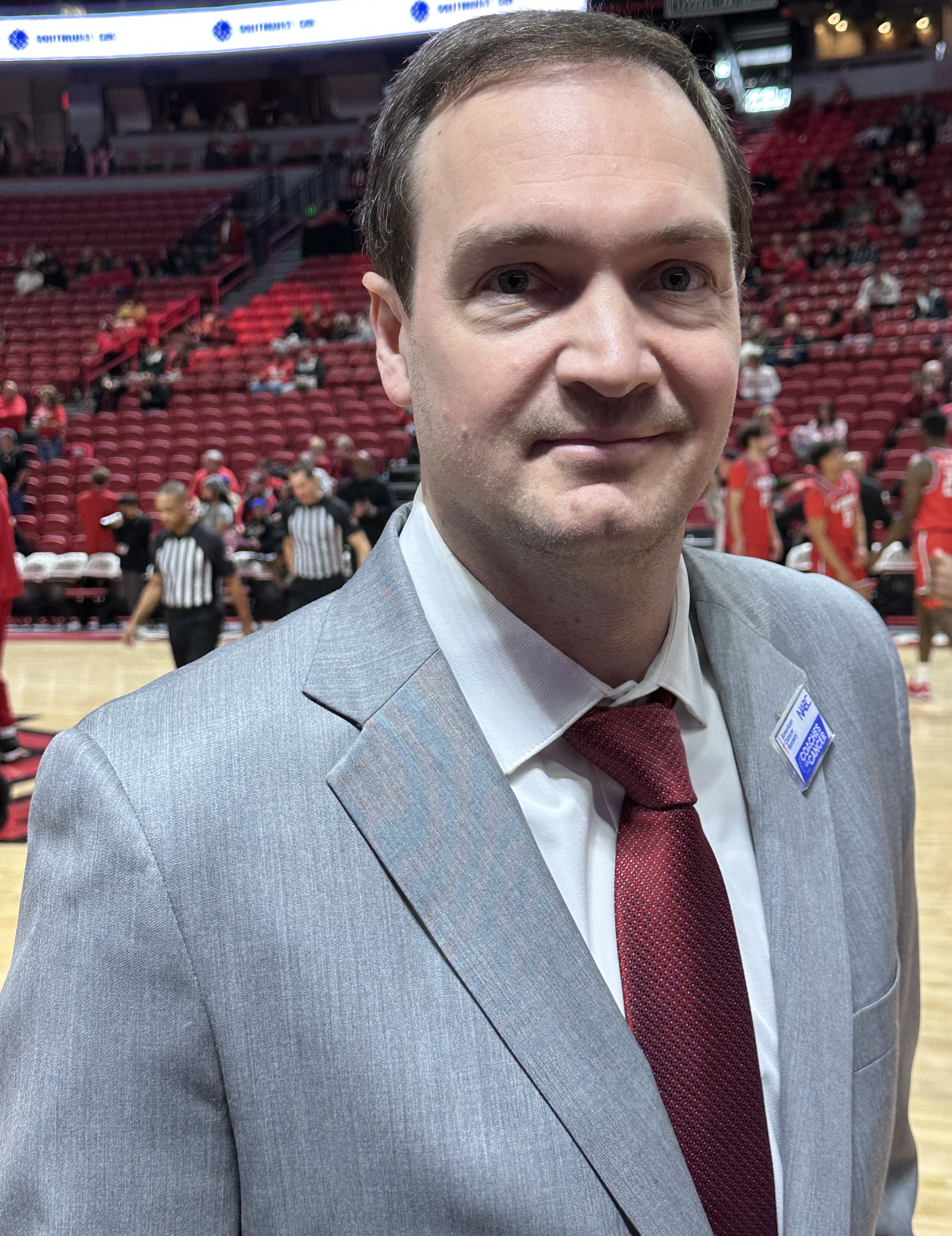
- Kruger in 2025

Illinois Fighting Illini
- Title: Assistant to the Head Coach
- League: Big Ten Conference

Personal information
- Born: May 1, 1983 (age 43) McAllen, Texas, U.S.
- Listed height: 6 ft 2 in (1.88 m)
- Listed weight: 185 lb (84 kg)

Career information
- High school: Walton (Marietta, Georgia)
- College: Arizona State (2003–2006); UNLV (2006–2007)
- NBA draft: 2007: undrafted
- Playing career: 2007–2013
- Position: Point guard
- Coaching career: 2016–present

Career history

Playing
- 2007–2008: Utah Flash
- 2008: Lukoil Academic
- 2009: Utah Flash
- 2009: NSB Napoli
- 2010: Utah Flash
- 2010: Soles de Mexicali
- 2010–2011: Utah Flash
- 2011–2012: Okapi Aalstar
- 2012–2013: Los Angeles D-Fenders
- 2013: Eisbären Bremerhaven

Coaching
- 2014–2016: Northern Arizona (asst.)
- 2016–2019: Oklahoma (asst.)
- 2019–2021: UNLV (asst.)
- 2021–2025: UNLV
- 2025-present: Illinois (asst. to the HC)

Kevin Michael Kruger (born May 1, 1983) is an American basketball coach and former player. Born in McAllen, Texas, Kruger played high school basketball at George Walton Comprehensive High School in Marietta, Georgia and college basketball at Arizona State and UNLV. Kruger then played professional basketball from 2007 to 2013, including multiple stints with NBA Development League teams Utah Flash and Los Angeles D-Fenders.

After retiring from playing basketball, Kruger became a college basketball coach, beginning as assistant coach at Northern Arizona from 2014 to 2016. Kruger later worked under his father, head coach Lon Kruger, as an assistant coach at Oklahoma from 2016 to 2019. Returning to UNLV, Kevin Kruger was an assistant coach from 2019 to 2021 before becoming head coach in 2021 until 2025. Later that year, Kruger was hired by Illinois.

== Early life and college basketball career ==
Kevin Michael Kruger was born in McAllen, Texas in 1983. His father, Lon Kruger, was head men's basketball coach at the University of Texas Pan American at the time. Kevin Kruger then grew up in Kansas, Florida, Illinois, and Georgia, as his father later was head coach at Kansas State University, the University of Florida, University of Illinois Urbana-Champaign, and Atlanta Hawks.

He attended Champaign Centennial High School in Champaign, Illinois, where he was a member of the basketball team. At the conclusion of his sophomore season, he moved to Marietta, Georgia, where he attended George Walton Comprehensive High School, graduating in 2002.

From 2002 to 2006, Kruger attended Arizona State University, redshirting his true freshman season in 2002–03 before playing at guard for the Arizona State Sun Devils from 2003 to 2006. Kruger had 43 starts in three seasons, including all 28 games in the 2005–06 season. His .812 free throw percentage was fourth best in Arizona State history. As a junior in 2005–06, Kruger averaged 15.0 points and led in minutes per games at 38.96.

After graduating from Arizona State in 2006 with a bachelor's degree in justice studies, Kruger transferred to the University of Nevada, Las Vegas to play his senior season under his father, by then the head coach for the UNLV Runnin' Rebels. In his senior season of 2006–07, Kevin Kruger averaged 13.5 points, 2.6 rebounds, and 5.1 assists on a UNLV team that advanced to the 2007 Sweet 16.

== Pro basketball career ==
Kruger was not drafted after his collegiate career; he was later invited to the Orlando Magic's training camp. Before the season began, he was cut and drafted by the Flash, the Utah Jazz's D-League team. He had a career high 35 points against the Reno Bighorns on March 1, 2009.

Kruger played for Okapi Aalstar in the Ethias League's 2011–2012 season. They won the Belgian Cup against the Antwerp Giants, 96–89 in overtime, a game during which Kruger scored 31 points.

== Coaching career ==
Kruger began his coaching career at Northern Arizona as an assistant for two seasons before joining his father's staff at Oklahoma.

In 2019, he returned to UNLV as an assistant coach under T. J. Otzelberger. When Otzelberger departed for the Iowa State head coaching position, Kruger was promoted to head coach of the Runnin' Rebels on March 21, 2021. Kruger was dismissed from the UNLV head coach position on March 15, 2025.

On July 9, 2025, the Illinois Fighting Illini announced Kruger's hiring as Assistant to the Head Coach.

== Head coaching record ==
=== College ===
Record table
Season	Team	Overall	Conference	Standing	Postseason
UNLV Runnin' Rebels (Mountain West) (2021–2025)
2021–22	UNLV	18–14	10–8	5th	
2022–23	UNLV	19–13	7–11	7th	
2023–24	UNLV	21–13	12–6	4th	NIT Quarterfinals
2024–25	UNLV	18–15	11–9	6th	
UNLV:		75–54 (.581)	40–34 (.541)		
Total:		75–54 (.581)			
National champion Postseason invitational champion Conference regular season champion Conference regular season and conference tournament champion Division regular season champion Division regular season and conference tournament champion Conference tournament champion
