= 2022–23 Southern Indiana Screaming Eagles men's basketball team =

American college basketball season

2022–23 Southern Indiana Screaming Eagles men's basketball

CBI, First Round
- Conference: Ohio Valley Conference
- Record: 16–17 (9–9 OVC)
- Head coach: Stan Gouard (3rd season)
- Assistant coaches: John Spruance; Jon Aldridge; Chris Moore
- Home arena: Screaming Eagles Arena

2022–23 Ohio Valley Conference men's basketball standings
	Conf.				Overall
Team	W		L	PCT	W		L	PCT
Morehead State	14	–	4	.778	22	–	12	.647
Tennessee Tech	11	–	7	.611	16	–	17	.485
UT Martin	10	–	8	.556	19	–	14	.576
Tennessee State	10	–	8	.556	18	–	14	.563
Southeast Missouri State †	10	–	8	.556	19	–	17	.528
SIU Edwardsville	9	–	9	.500	19	–	14	.576
Southern Indiana*	9	–	9	.500	16	–	17	.485
Lindenwood*	6	–	12	.333	11	–	21	.344
Little Rock	6	–	12	.333	10	–	21	.323
Eastern Illinois	5	–	13	.278	9	–	22	.290
† 2023 OVC tournament winner * ineligible for the 2023 NCAA tournament due to transition period

The 2022–23 Southern Indiana Screaming Eagles men's basketball team represented the University of Southern Indiana in the 2022–23 NCAA Division I men's basketball season. The Screaming Eagles, led by third-year head coach Stan Gouard, played their home games at Screaming Eagles Arena in Evansville, Indiana as members of the Ohio Valley Conference (OVC). They finished the season 16–17, 9–9 in OVC play, to finish in a tie for sixth place. As the No. 7 seed in the OVC tournament, they lost to SIU Edwardsville in the first round. The Screaming Eagles received an invitation to the College Basketball Invitational as the No. 15 seed. There they lost to San Jose State in the first round.

The season marked Southern Indiana's first year of a four-year transition period from Division II to Division I. As a result, the Screaming Eagles are not eligible for the NCAA tournament until the 2026–27 season.

== Previous season ==
The Screaming Eagles finished the 2021–22 season 18–8, 12–6 in Great Lakes Valley Conference (GLVC) play, to finish in second place in the East Division. They defeated Illinois–Springfield in the first round of the GLVC tournament, before falling to UMSL in the quarterfinals.

== Roster ==
2022–23 Southern Indiana Screaming Eagles men's basketball team
Players
Coaches

Pos.	#	Name	Height	Weight	Year	Hometown
G	0	Jelani Simmons	6 ft 5 in (1.96 m)	190 lb (86 kg)	Sr	Columbus, OH
G	1	Isaiah Swope	5 ft 10 in (1.78 m)	170 lb (77 kg)	So	Newburgh, IN
G	2	Gary Solomon	6 ft 6 in (1.98 m)	200 lb (91 kg)	Jr	Detroit, MI
G	3	Tyler Henry	6 ft 4 in (1.93 m)	186 lb (84 kg)	Jr	Brooklyn, NY
F	4	Peter Nwoke	6 ft 7 in (2.01 m)	215 lb (98 kg)	Fr	Lagos, Nigeria
G	5	Ryan Hall	6 ft 5 in (1.96 m)	190 lb (86 kg)	So	Kettering, OH
G	10	Sam Mervis	5 ft 11 in (1.8 m)	175 lb (79 kg)	So	Indianapolis, IN
F	11	Jack Mielke	6 ft 7 in (2.01 m)	220 lb (100 kg)	So	Downers Grove, IL
G	13	Jeremiah Hernandez	6 ft 4 in (1.93 m)	180 lb (82 kg)	So	Chicago, IL
G/F	21	AJ Smith	6 ft 6 in (1.98 m)	215 lb (98 kg)	Fr	Edwardsville, IL
G	24	Jack Campion	5 ft 11 in (1.8 m)	170 lb (77 kg)	Fr	Milton, WI
F	32	Jacob Polakovich	6 ft 9 in (2.06 m)	245 lb (111 kg)	Sr	Grand Rapids, MI
F	33	Trevor Lakes	6 ft 8 in (2.03 m)	220 lb (100 kg)	GS	Lebanon, IN
F	50	Nick Hittle	6 ft 10 in (2.08 m)	245 lb (111 kg)	So	Indianapolis, IN
C	52	Kiyron Powell	6 ft 8 in (2.03 m)	210 lb (95 kg)	Fr	Evansville, IN

Head coach

- Stan Gouard (Southern Indiana)

Assistant coach(es)

- John Spruance (Hope)
- Jon Aldridge (Indianapolis)
- Chris Moore (Kentucky State)

Legend

- (C) Team captain
- (S) Suspended
- (I) Ineligible
- (W) Walk-on
- Injured
- Current redshirt

Roster
Last update: November 13, 2022

== Schedule and results ==
Date time, TV	Rank^{#}	Opponent^{#}	Result	Record	Site (attendance) city, state
Exhibition
November 2, 2022*; 7:00 p.m.		Midway	W 85–50	–	Screaming Eagles Arena (1,369); Evansville, IN
Non-conference regular season
November 7, 2022*; 6:00 p.m., SECN+/ESPN+		at Missouri	L 91–97	0–1	Mizzou Arena (10,723); Columbia, MO
November 13, 2022*; 3:00 p.m., ESPN+		Southern Illinois	W 71–53	1–1	Screaming Eagles Arena (3,071); Evansville, IN
November 16, 2022*; 7:00 p.m., ACCN		at Notre Dame; Gotham Classic	L 70–82	1–2	Joyce Center (4,433); South Bend, IN
November 18, 2022*; 7:00 p.m., ESPN+		Loras College	W 87–55	2–2	Screaming Eagles Arena (1,551); Evansville, IN
November 22, 2022*; 6:00 p.m., ESPN+		at St. Bonaventure; Gotham Classic	L 66–80	2–3	Reilly Center (3,102); Olean, NY
November 26, 2022*; 3:00 p.m., ESPN+		at Bowling Green; Gotham Classic	W 69–57	3–3	Stroh Center (1,199); Bowling Green, OH
November 30, 2022*; 7:30 p.m.		at Western Illinois	L 78–86	3–4	Western Hall (493); Macomb, IL
December 4, 2022*; 2:00 p.m.		at Chicago State	L 61–78	3–5	Jones Convocation Center; Chicago, IL
December 7, 2022*; 7:00 p.m., ESPN+		Anderson (IN)	W 78–47	4–5	Screaming Eagles Arena (1,235); Evansville, IN
December 11, 2022*; 3:00 p.m., ESPN+		Indiana State	W 88–85 ^{OT}	5–5	Screaming Eagles Arena (2,989); Evansville, IN
December 15, 2022*; 7:00 p.m., ESPN+		Saint Mary-of-the-Woods	W 84–42	6–5	Screaming Eagles Arena (1,469); Evansville, IN
December 19, 2022*; 3:00 p.m., ESPN+		vs. IUPUI; Indiana Classic	W 87–74	7–5	Memorial Coliseum (176); Fort Wayne, IN
December 20, 2022*; 6:00 p.m., ESPN+		at Purdue Fort Wayne; Indiana Classic	L 59–83	7–6	Memorial Coliseum (2,145); Fort Wayne, IN
OVC regular season
December 29, 2022; 7:30 p.m., ESPN+		Southeast Missouri State	W 86–81	8–6 (1–0)	Screaming Eagles Arena (3,110); Evansville, IN
December 31, 2022; 3:30 p.m., ESPN+		at Eastern Illinois	L 80–91	8–7 (1–1)	Lantz Arena (1,125); Charleston, IL
January 5, 2023; 7:30 p.m., ESPN+		at Morehead State	L 80–84	8–8 (1–2)	Ellis Johnson Arena (1,655); Morehead, KY
January 7, 2023; 7:30 p.m., ESPN+		SIU Edwardsville	L 62–69	8–9 (1–3)	Screaming Eagles Arena (2,269); Evansville, IN
January 12, 2023; 7:30 p.m., ESPN+		Little Rock	W 74–67	9–9 (2–3)	Screaming Eagles Arena (2,296); Evansville, IN
January 14, 2023; 7:30 p.m., ESPN+		UT Martin	W 80–66	10–9 (3–3)	Screaming Eagles Arena (2,560); Evansville, IN
January 19, 2023; 7:30 p.m., ESPN+		at Lindenwood	W 81–65	11–9 (4–3)	Hyland Arena (2,073); St. Charles, MO
January 21, 2023; 3:30 p.m., ESPN+		at SIU Edwardsville	W 82–72	12–9 (5–3)	First Community Arena (1,527); Edwardsville, IL
January 26, 2023; 7:30 p.m., ESPN+		Eastern Illinois	W 78–74	13–9 (6–3)	Screaming Eagles Arena (2,136); Evansville, IN
January 28, 2023; 3:30 p.m., ESPN+		at UT Martin	L 83–86	13–10 (6–4)	Skyhawk Arena (1,927); Union City, TN
February 2, 2023; 7:30 p.m., ESPN+		Tennessee State	L 76–80	13–11 (6–5)	Screaming Eagles Arena (2,018); Evansville, IN
February 4, 2023; 3:30 p.m., ESPN+		Morehead State	L 66–71	13–12 (6–6)	Screaming Eagles Arena (3,644); Evansville, IN
February 9, 2023; 7:30 p.m., ESPN+		at Tennessee Tech	L 69–84	13–13 (6–7)	Eblen Center (1,977); Cookeville, TN
February 11, 2023; 7:30 p.m., ESPN+		Lindenwood	W 74–64	14–13 (7–7)	Screaming Eagles Arena (2,659); Evansville, IN
February 16, 2023; 7:30 p.m., ESPN+		at Little Rock	W 82–81	15–13 (8–7)	Jack Stephens Center (2,939); Little Rock, AR
February 18, 2023; 4:00 p.m., ESPN+		at Southeast Missouri State	L 80–85	15–14 (8–8)	Show Me Center (2,340); Cape Girardeau, MO
February 23, 2023; 7:30 p.m., ESPN+		Tennessee Tech	L 79–82	15–15 (8–9)	Screaming Eagles Arena (2,195); Evansville, IN
February 25, 2023; 3:30 p.m., ESPN+		at Tennessee State	W 93–81	16–15 (9–9)	Gentry Complex (5,139); Nashville, TN
Ohio Valley tournament
March 1, 2023; 9:30 p.m., ESPN+	(7)	vs. (6) SIU Edwardsville; First round	L 54–68	16–16	Ford Center; Evansville, IN
College Basketball Invitational
March 18, 2023; 4:00 p.m., FloHoops	(15)	vs. (2) San Jose State; First round	L 52–77	16–17	Ocean Center; Daytona Beach, FL
*Non-conference game. ^{#}Rankings from AP poll. (#) Tournament seedings in parentheses. All times are in Central.
