= 2022–23 Tennessee State Tigers basketball team =

American college basketball season

2022–23 Tennessee State Tigers basketball
- Conference: Ohio Valley Conference
- Record: 18–14 (10–8 OVC)
- Head coach: Brian Collins (5th season)
- Assistant coaches: Jerry Nichols; Russ Willemsen; Josh Bone
- Home arena: Gentry Complex

2022–23 Ohio Valley Conference men's basketball standings
	Conf.				Overall
Team	W		L	PCT	W		L	PCT
Morehead State	14	–	4	.778	22	–	12	.647
Tennessee Tech	11	–	7	.611	16	–	17	.485
UT Martin	10	–	8	.556	19	–	14	.576
Tennessee State	10	–	8	.556	18	–	14	.563
Southeast Missouri State †	10	–	8	.556	19	–	17	.528
SIU Edwardsville	9	–	9	.500	19	–	14	.576
Southern Indiana*	9	–	9	.500	16	–	17	.485
Lindenwood*	6	–	12	.333	11	–	21	.344
Little Rock	6	–	12	.333	10	–	21	.323
Eastern Illinois	5	–	13	.278	9	–	22	.290
† 2023 OVC tournament winner * ineligible for the 2023 NCAA tournament due to transition period

The 2022–23 Tennessee State Tigers basketball team represented Tennessee State University in the 2022–23 NCAA Division I men's basketball season. The Tigers, led by fifth-year head coach Brian Collins, played their home games at the Gentry Complex in Nashville, Tennessee as members of the Ohio Valley Conference (OVC).

The Tigers finished the season 18–14, 10–8 in OVC play, to finish in a tie for third place. As the No. 4 seed in the OVC tournament, they lost in the quarterfinals to Southeast Missouri State.

== Previous season ==
The Tigers finished the 2021–22 season 14–18, 8–10 in OVC play, to finish in a tie for fifth place. They defeated SIU Edwardsville in the first round of the OVC tournament, before falling to Southeast Missouri State in the quarterfinals.

== Roster ==
2022–23 Tennessee State Tigers men's basketball team
Players
Coaches

Pos.	#	Name	Height	Weight	Year	Hometown
F	0	Zion Griffin	6 ft 7 in (2.01 m)	215 lb (98 kg)	GS	Chicago, IL
G	1	Marcus Jr. Fitzgerald	6 ft 2 in (1.88 m)	175 lb (79 kg)	So	Nashville, TN
F	2	Christian Brown	6 ft 6 in (1.98 m)	215 lb (98 kg)	Jr	Hopkins, SC
G	3	Ethan Riggs Abner	6 ft 6 in (1.98 m)	195 lb (88 kg)	So	Mount Juliet, TN
G	4	Jr. Clay	6 ft 0 in (1.83 m)	170 lb (77 kg)	GS	Chattanooga, TN
G	5	Tajik Bartholomew	6 ft 3 in (1.91 m)	—	Jr	Austin, TX
C	10	Adong Makuoi	6 ft 9 in (2.06 m)	220 lb (100 kg)	GS	Edmonton, AB
G	11	Justin Williams	6 ft 3 in (1.91 m)	185 lb (84 kg)	So	Los Angeles, CA
G/F	12	Learic Davis	6 ft 7 in (2.01 m)	180 lb (82 kg)	Fr	Milwaukee, WI
F	13	Zool Kueth	6 ft 7 in (2.01 m)	210 lb (95 kg)	GS	Gallatin, TN
G	20	Dedric Boyd	6 ft 4 in (1.93 m)	195 lb (88 kg)	RS Sr	Brownsville, TN
F	23	Emmanuel Dowuona	6 ft 10 in (2.08 m)	245 lb (111 kg)	RS Jr	Miami, FL
G	30	Jalen Anglin	6 ft 4 in (1.93 m)	182 lb (83 kg)	Fr	Atwood, TN
F	44	David Acosta	6 ft 11 in (2.11 m)	—	Jr	Santiago, Dominican Republic
G	55	Knute Wood	6 ft 4 in (1.93 m)	—	Fr	Killen, AL

Head coach

- Brian Collins (Belmont)

Assistant coach(es)

- Jerry Nichols (Arkansas State)
- Russ Willemsen (Lee)
- Josh Bone (Tennessee)

Legend

- (C) Team captain
- (S) Suspended
- (I) Ineligible
- (W) Walk-on
- Injured
- Current redshirt

Roster
Last update: December 11, 2022

== Schedule and results ==
Date time, TV	Rank^{#}	Opponent^{#}	Result	Record	Site (attendance) city, state
Non-conference regular season
November 7, 2022*; 8:00 p.m., ESPN+		Fisk	W 85–75	1–0	Gentry Complex (8,967); Nashville, TN
November 12, 2022*; 11:00 a.m., ESPN+		South Carolina State	W 80–61	2–0	Gentry Complex (1,307); Nashville, TN
November 14, 2022*; 8:00 p.m., ESPN+		Alabama A&M	W 87–76	3–0	Gentry Complex (5,619); Nashville, TN
November 17, 2022*; 7:00 p.m., ESPN+		at Southern Illinois; SoCal Challenge campus-site game	L 44–57	3–1	Banterra Center (3,780); Carbondale, IL
November 21, 2022*; 2:00 p.m., FloHoops		vs. Cal State Northridge; SoCal Challenge Sand Division semifinals	W 74–73	4–1	The Pavilion at JSerra (321); San Juan Capistrano, CA
November 23, 2022*; 4:30 p.m., FloHoops		vs. High Point; SoCal Challenge Sand Division championship	L 72–77	4–2	The Pavilion at JSerra (300); San Juan Capistrano, CA
November 30, 2022*; 8:00 p.m., ESPN+		at Saint Louis	L 63–80	4–3	Chaifetz Arena (5,025); St. Louis, MO
December 3, 2022*; 3:00 p.m., ESPN+		at Austin Peay	L 61–77	4–4	Dunn Center (1,736); Clarksville, TN
December 6, 2022*; 7:00 p.m., ESPN+		Boyce	W 103–49	5–4	Gentry Complex (257); Nashville, TN
December 11, 2022*; 2:30 p.m., ESPN+		Lipscomb	W 90–85	6–4	Gentry Complex (708); Nashville, TN
December 14, 2022*; 7:00 p.m., ESPN+		Charleston Southern	L 87–91	6–5	Gentry Complex (537); Nashville, TN
December 17, 2022*; 2:00 p.m., ESPN+		Bryan	W 99–78	7–5	Gentry Complex (378); Nashville, TN
December 20, 2022*; 2:00 p.m., ESPN+		Brescia	W 98–83	8–5	Gentry Complex (427); Nashville, TN
OVC regular season
December 29, 2022; 8:00 p.m., ESPN+		Morehead State	L 75–83	8–6 (0–1)	Gentry Complex (437); Nashville, TN
December 31, 2022; 3:30 p.m., ESPN+		Little Rock	W 94–69	9–6 (1–1)	Gentry Complex (590); Nashville, TN
January 5, 2023; 6:00 p.m., ESPNEWS		at SIU Edwardsville	L 72–81	9–7 (1–2)	First Community Arena (1,187); Edwardsville, IL
January 7, 2023; 3:30 p.m., ESPN+		at Lindenwood	W 60–57	10–7 (2–2)	Hyland Performance Arena (1,517); St. Charles, MO
January 12, 2023; 8:00 p.m., ESPN+		UT Martin	L 66–77	10–8 (2–3)	Gentry Complex (372); Nashville, TN
January 14, 2023; 3:00 p.m., ESPN+		at Tennessee Tech	L 63–71	10–9 (2–4)	Eblen Center (1,573); Cookeville, TN
January 19, 2023; 8:00 p.m., ESPN+		Eastern Illinois	W 78–74	11–9 (3–4)	Gentry Complex (6,331); Nashville, TN
January 21, 2023; 3:30 p.m., ESPN+		at Little Rock	L 77–89	11–10 (3–5)	Jack Stephens Center (3,446); Little Rock, AR
January 26, 2023; 7:00 p.m., ESPN+		at Southeast Missouri State	L 75–92	11–11 (3–6)	Show Me Center (1,857); Cape Girardeau, MO
January 28, 2023; 3:30 p.m., ESPN+		Lindenwood	W 83–66	12–11 (4–6)	Gentry Complex (1,256); Nashville, TN
February 2, 2023; 7:30 p.m., ESPN+		at Southern Indiana	W 80–76	13–11 (5–6)	Screaming Eagles Arena (2,018); Evansville, IN
February 4, 2023; 3:30 p.m., ESPN+		at Eastern Illinois	W 65–61	14–11 (6–6)	Lantz Arena (1,528); Charleston, IL
February 9, 2023; 8:00 p.m., ESPN+		Southeast Missouri State	W 85–65	15–11 (7–6)	Gentry Complex (6,691); Nashville, TN
February 11, 2023; 3:30 p.m., ESPN+		Tennessee Tech	W 67–53	16–11 (8–6)	Gentry Complex (4,347); Nashville, TN
February 16, 2023; 6:00 p.m., ESPN+		at Morehead State	L 64–74	16–12 (8–7)	Ellis Johnson Arena (2,468); Morehead, KY
February 18, 2023; 3:30 p.m., ESPN+		SIU Edwardsville	W 100–85	17–12 (9–7)	Gentry Complex (4,119); Nashville, TN
February 23, 2023; 8:00 p.m., ESPN+		at UT Martin	W 88–82	18–12 (10–7)	Skyhawk Arena (3,418); Union City, TN
February 25, 2023; 3:30 p.m., ESPN+		Southern Indiana	L 81–93	18–13 (10–8)	Gentry Complex (5,139); Nashville, TN
Ohio Valley Conference tournament
March 2, 2023; 6:30 p.m., ESPN+	(4)	vs. (5) Southeast Missouri State; Quarterfinals	L 83–91	18–14	Ford Center (968); Evansville, IN
*Non-conference game. ^{#}Rankings from AP poll. (#) Tournament seedings in parentheses. All times are in Central.
