= 2023 Ohio Valley Conference men's basketball tournament =

- Classification: Division I
- Season: 2022–23
- Teams: 8
- Site: Ford Center; Evansville, Indiana
- Champions: Southeast Missouri State (2nd title)
- Winning coach: Brad Korn (1st title)
- MVP: Chris Harris (Southeast Missouri State)
- Television: ESPN+, ESPNU, ESPN2

The 2023 Ohio Valley Conference Men's Basketball Tournament was the final event of the 2022–23 NCAA Division I men's basketball season in the Ohio Valley Conference. The tournament was held March 1–4, 2023 at the Ford Center in Evansville, Indiana.

2022–23 Ohio Valley Conference men's basketball standings
	Conf.				Overall
Team	W		L	PCT	W		L	PCT
Morehead State	14	–	4	.778	22	–	12	.647
Tennessee Tech	11	–	7	.611	16	–	17	.485
UT Martin	10	–	8	.556	19	–	14	.576
Tennessee State	10	–	8	.556	18	–	14	.563
Southeast Missouri State †	10	–	8	.556	19	–	17	.528
SIU Edwardsville	9	–	9	.500	19	–	14	.576
Southern Indiana*	9	–	9	.500	16	–	17	.485
Lindenwood*	6	–	12	.333	11	–	21	.344
Little Rock	6	–	12	.333	10	–	21	.323
Eastern Illinois	5	–	13	.278	9	–	22	.290
† 2023 OVC tournament winner * ineligible for the 2023 NCAA tournament due to transition period

== Seeds ==
Only the top eight teams in the conference qualified for the tournament. Teams were seeded by record within the conference, with a tiebreaker system to seed teams with identical conference records.

If a team that is not eligible for the NCAA Tournament wins the Ohio Valley Conference Tournament, the conference's automatic bid goes to the tournament runner-up. If that team is also not eligible, i.e. two ineligible teams met in the tournament final, the automatic bid goes to the highest seeded tournament-eligible team.

Seed	School	Conf.	Tiebreaker
1	Morehead State	14–4	
2	Tennessee Tech	11–7	
3	UT Martin	10–8	3-1 vs. TSU/SEMO
4	Tennessee State	10–8	2-2 vs. UTM/SEMO
5	Southeast Missouri State	10–8	1-3 vs. UTM/TSU
6	SIU Edwardsville	9–9	1-1 vs. Tennessee Tech
7	Southern Indiana	9–9	0-2 vs. Tennessee Tech
8	Lindenwood	6-12	2-0 vs. UALR
DNQ	Little Rock	6-12	0-2 vs. Lindenwood
DNQ	Eastern Illinois	5-13	

== Schedule ==
Game	Time	Matchup	Score	Television
First round – Wednesday, March 1
1	6:00 pm	No. 5 Southeast Missouri State vs. No. 8 Lindenwood	84–65	ESPN+
2	9:30 pm	No. 6 SIU Edwardsville vs. No. 7 Southern Indiana	68–54	ESPN+
Quarterfinals – Thursday, March 2
3	6:30 pm	No. 4 Tennessee State vs. No. 5 Southeast Missouri State	83–91	ESPN+
4	9:00 pm	No. 3 UT Martin vs. No. 6 SIU Edwardsville	81–75	ESPN+
Semifinals – Friday, March 3
5	7:00 pm	No. 1 Morehead State vs. No. 5 Southeast Missouri State	58–65	ESPNU
6	9:30 pm	No. 2 Tennessee Tech vs. No. 3 UT Martin	78–63	ESPNU
Championship – Saturday, March 4
7	7:00 pm	No. 5 Southeast Missouri State vs. No. 2 Tennessee Tech	89–82	ESPN2
All game times in Central Time.

== Bracket ==
First round Wednesday, March 1
5	Southeast Missouri State	84
8	Lindenwood	65
6	SIU Edwardsville	68
7	Southern Indiana	54

Quarterfinals; Thursday, March 2
4	Tennessee State	83
5	Southeast Missouri State	91
3	UT Martin	81
6	SIU Edwardsville	75

Semifinals; Friday, March 3
1	Morehead State	58
5	Southeast Missouri State	65
2	Tennessee Tech	78
3	UT Martin	63

Championship; Saturday, March 4
5	Southeast Missouri State	89*
2	Tennessee Tech	82

* — Denotes overtime period
