= 2022–23 SIU Edwardsville Cougars men's basketball team =

American college basketball season

2022–23 SIU Edwardsville Cougars men's basketball
- Conference: Ohio Valley Conference
- Record: 19–14 (9–9 OVC)
- Head coach: Brian Barone (4th season)
- Assistant coaches: Colin Schneider; Terrance McGee; Kristof Kendrick; Mike Waldo (Special Assistant)
- Home arena: First Community Arena

2022–23 Ohio Valley Conference men's basketball standings
	Conf.				Overall
Team	W		L	PCT	W		L	PCT
Morehead State	14	–	4	.778	22	–	12	.647
Tennessee Tech	11	–	7	.611	16	–	17	.485
UT Martin	10	–	8	.556	19	–	14	.576
Tennessee State	10	–	8	.556	18	–	14	.563
Southeast Missouri State †	10	–	8	.556	19	–	17	.528
SIU Edwardsville	9	–	9	.500	19	–	14	.576
Southern Indiana*	9	–	9	.500	16	–	17	.485
Lindenwood*	6	–	12	.333	11	–	21	.344
Little Rock	6	–	12	.333	10	–	21	.323
Eastern Illinois	5	–	13	.278	9	–	22	.290
† 2023 OVC tournament winner * ineligible for the 2023 NCAA tournament due to transition period

The 2022–23 SIU Edwardsville Cougars men's basketball team represented Southern Illinois University Edwardsville in the 2022–23 NCAA Division I men's basketball season. The Cougars, led by fourth-year head coach Brian Barone, played their home games at the First Community Arena in Edwardsville, Illinois as members of the Ohio Valley Conference. They finished the season 19–14, 9–9 in OVC play to finish in a tie for sixth place. As the No. 6 seed in the OVC tournament, they defeated Southern Indiana in the first round before losing to UT Martin.

== Previous season ==
The Cougars finished the 2021–22 season 11–21, 4–13 in OVC play to finish in eighth place. They lost in the first round of the OVC tournament to Tennessee State.

Despite missing a third of the season to injury, SIUE freshman guard Ray'Sean Taylor was named to the Kyle Macy Freshmen All-America Team and was a finalist for the Kyle Macy Award given to the top freshman in NCAA Division I college basketball.

== Season forecast ==
Eight players return from the 2021–22 squad. They are joined by two freshmen (one a walk-on), four transfers from junior colleges (including the NABC JuCo Player of the Year), and one graduate student transfer from a Division I program with a year of remaining eligibility.

In a vote of Ohio Valley Conference head men's basketball coaches and communication directors, SIUE was picked to finish 5th in the 10 team Ohio Valley Conference, while receiving two first place votes. Guard Ray’Sean Taylor and forward DeeJuan Pruitt were named to the 10 member 2022-23 Preseason All-OVC Team.

== Regular season ==
The Cougars opened the season against once frequent opponent, Harris Stowe of St. Louis. Double doubles from DeeJuan Pruitt (20 pts, 10 reb.) and Damarco Minor (11 pts, 10 asst.) led SIUE to a 28 point win, 85-57. Lamar Wright and Ray'Sean Taylor also scored in double digits, with 12 Cougar players seeing game action.

Defending Horizon League champion Purdue Fort Wayne took a double digit first half lead on the Cougars with a barrage of 3 point buckets. SIUE made a comeback in the second half, cutting the lead to three before the Mastodons' long range shooting locked up their win.

On November 14, the Ohio Valley Conference named Damarco Minor the OVC Newcomer of the Week for his play in games against Harris Stowe and Purdue Fort Wayne.

Missouri shot 60% from the field and dominated SIUE 105-80, despite four Cougars scoring in double figures.

In their opener of the JK54 Classic round robin tournament, there were 18 ties and 13 lead changes before SIUE beat Fairleigh Dickinson 79-78 on a 10-foot turnaround-jumper with 6.5 seconds to play by Lamar Wright. Damarco Minor's 22 points led four Cougars in double figures, and Jonathan Kurtas had his first career double-double (13 pts, 10 rebounds.)

After falling behind 11-3, the Cougars found their game and easily defeated VMI 93-67. Lamar Wright topped four Cougars in double figures with a career-high 24 points. Shamar Wright also had a career-high with 11 assists as SIUE had 19 assists. The Cougars forced 24 turnovers, including 14 steals---the most in the Division I era. They also hit a season-best 33 field goals, with their 13 3-pointers being the most for an SIUE team since two years ago versus LSU.

For their third game in three days, SIUE met Longwood, the hosts of the JK54 Classic (honoring Longwood All-American Jerome Kersey) and the defending Big South Conference champions. The two teams had tired legs after both had won their first two tourney games, but both brought their strong defenses to the game.. Longwood took an early lead, but the Cougars fought to an 8 point halftime lead. SIUE led by as many as 11 points before the home team went on a ten point run to take a three-point lead, but the Cougars retook the lead and held on for a 61-56 win. Ray'Sean Taylor led all scorers with 15 points, and his 11 first half points led to the SIUE halftime lead. Damarco Minor scored all of his 9 points in the second half and was a major factor in the Cougars hanging on for the win. The victory snapped Longwood's 15-game home court winning streak and earned the Cougars the program's first tournament title since defeating Longwood in the 2010 Las Vegas Classic, the two schools' only previous meeting.

Cougar redshirt-sophomore guard Ray'Sean Taylor is one of 50 players from the 21 so-called "mid-major" conferences named to the Lou Henson Award Watch List. The Lou Henson National Player of the Year Award is given annually to the top mid-major player in NCAA Division I college basketball and is named after the late former Illinois and New Mexico State head coach, who won 775 games in 41 seasons. and remains the winningest coach in both schools' histories.

It was a defensive battle with two teams shutting down the other's offence as the Cougars visited the Kansas City Roos. SIUE took a 2 point halftime lead on a slam dunk by Jonathan Kurtas at the buzzer. SIUE's shooting percentage was only 32% for the game after going only 28% in the first half. The Cougars, however, picked up the majority of the many missed shots, besting one of the best rebounding teams in the nation 47-41. SIUE garnered nine steals and forced 15 turnovers, generating 21 points off turnovers. The Cougars took their first 10-point lead on a three-pointer with 5:08 to play by Shamar Wright, only to see the Roos go on an eight point run. In the final two and a half minutes, SIUE finished on a 9-1 run while holding Kansas City to only a single free throw, to close out the 64-54 win. Shamar Wright led the Cougars in scoring, with 16 points, to go with eight rebounds and three steals. Damarco "Polo" Minor added 13 points, and DeeJuan Pruitt scored seven points while taking down in 10 rebounds---his third double-digit rebounding game of the young season. The victory gave SIUE its first 4-game road winning streak of the Division I era, and their 5-2 record is the program's best Division I season's opening.

The Cougars beat St. Ambrose 89-54 in only their second home game of the season. It was the team's fifth consecutive win and its sixth non-conference win of the season--- both high marks in SIUE's Division I era.. Four SIUE players scored in double figures, and three others just missed that goal, each scoring at least eight points. Terrance Thompson's career-high 15 points led the team. He was 7-9 from the field and added 4 rebounds, 2 assists and 2 steals. Ray'Sean Taylor scored 13 points and had 6 rebounds and 4 assists. Lamar Wright scored 12 points, striking early on his first three shots from three-point range. Damarco Minor had 10 points, 4 rebounds, an assist, and 2 steals. In all, twelve Cougars saw game action and added to their statistical totals.

SIUE and Troy were both 6-2 before their Saturday afternoon game. The Trojans scored the first basket, but the Cougars scored the next nine points and never trailed again. When Ray'Sean Taylor sank a three pointer with 7:39 left before halftime, the home team took its largest lead at 12 points. SIUE had a 41-34 halftime lead, but the Alabama team's pressure caused two quick turnovers as the second half began, shaving the lead to only three. Several times, the Cougars then stretched the lead, only to see the visitors move closer. As time closed down to 10 minutes left in the game, Troy scored eight straight points to tie the score on a three-point shot. The home team stretched their lead once more, only to see the visitors close the gap to 65-64 at the five-minute mark. The Cougars then allowed no more and outscored Troy 13-8 for the hectic remainder of the game. Ray'Sean Taylor led the game in scoring (21) and rebounding (8). This was his first 20-point scoring job of the year and the 10th of his career. Three other Cougars hit double digit scoring--- Damarco Minor- 17 with 4 assists and 3 steals, Lamar Wright - 14 with 3 3-pointers, and Shamar Wright -13. SIUE began the game among the top 35 in the NCAA in turnovers forced and forced 17 from Troy, turning them into 25 points. The Cougars now have a six-game winning streak--- the longest for SIUE since the 2005-06 (Division II) season. Their now-seven nonconference wins is also a program high since the school joined the Ohio Valley Conference.

Ray'Sean Taylor's last second over-the-shoulder shot went in, but the final buzzer sounded while it was still in the air, and the Bradley Braves won 56-54 to stop the SIUE win streak at six games while extending their own to four. The Cougars came out strong, shooting 54% in the first half, for an eight point halftime lead. The second half was another story. Bradley began with 13 unanswered points, helped by three Cougar turnovers. After giving up the lead, SIUE played the visitors fairly even for the rest of the game, but they were never able to regain the lead. Nine Cougar players saw action, but DeeJuan Pruitt missed his third game due to illness.

For their second consecutive Missouri Valley Conference opponent, the Cougars visited the Illinois State Redbirds for their Return to Horton Fieldhouse to honor ISU alumnus Doug Collins. The home team scored the first basket before SIUE reeled off nine unanswered points. ISU battled back, but SIUE held onto their lead, going into halftime up 34-33. The Redbirds again scored first in the second half and went out to a six point lead before the Cougars ran off a 12-2 run to take a four point lead. The two teams went back and forth from halfway through the second half until 3:44 remaining, when ISU took its final lead. They stretched it out to as many as seven points. Then it was SIUE scores, SIUE fouls, ISU shoots free throws, and repeat, and repeat with the Redbirds winning 77-71. Despite losing, four Cougars scored in double figures; Ray'Sean Taylor' - 20, Shamar Wright -12, Terrance Thompson -11, Jonathan Kurtas -10.

The Division III Scarlet Hawks of IIT, coached by former Cougar Terrance "T.J." Gray, visited First Community Arena. The visitors held their own during the first half of the first half, taking the lead three times by as many as four points. Then, the Cougars defense clamped down, and they started hitting their shots, with a streak of eleven made shots while going 13 for 15 in the last ten minutes of the half, and SIUE led by as many as 16 on the way to a 51-40 halftime lead. Fourteen years after graduating, T.J. Gray still holds the SIUE record for 3 point baskets in a season, and his team played the same way, shooting 15-32 from outside the line to keep the Cougars from blowing them out of the gym. The home team was 10-23 on 3's, while shooting an overall 59% for the game. They tied their season high for points and tied the school record of 11 blocked shots in a game. Twelve Cougars saw game action (including DeeJuan Pruitt after missing four games), and all twelve scored, with five scoring in double figures; Ray'Sean Taylor - 20, Damarco "Polo" Minor- 17, both Lamar Wright & Shamar Wright -13, Jonathan Kurtas -10.

The visiting Cougars and the Saint Louis Billikens played even, if poorly for the first fourteen minutes, but SIUE then went cold, hitting only one of fourteen shots for the rest of the half, while the home team went on a 12-2 run to take a 33-22 halftime lead. The Cougars opened the second half with an eight point run, only to see the Bills answer with their own 22-7 run for an eighteen (18) point lead with 11:06 left in the game. Then, the Cougars defense went into overdrive, forcing repeated St.Louis turnovers, and the offense started hitting their shots. Slowly, the lead shrank, until DeeJuan Pruitt sank a pair of free throws to tie the game at 66 with only 1:06 remaining. Stymied in the first half, Ray'Sean Taylor scored 9 of his 12 points in the second, including the Cougars' last three to lock up the win. Lamar Wright, shut out in the first, scored 13 second half points, including three of three three pointers. Ray'Sean Taylor led SIUE with a career high 21 points and took down 9 rebounds. Damarco Minor added 12 points, while Shamar Wright led the team with 4 assists and a career-high 12 rebounds. The Cougars' nine nonconference wins is the most as a Division I team, and the 9-4 record is the best season start for SIUE since the 2006-07 team was also 9-4.

In their conference opener, SIUE and Tennessee Tech played even for the first ten minutes. Then the Cougars stepped it up and took a ten point halftime lead. Tech's Golden Eagles came out with an eight point run to open the second half. SIUE again stepped up their game, answering Tech's run with a nine point run of their own. After that, the Cougars never led by less than nine, leading by as much as 17 and winning 64-51. Shamar Wright led the team with 18 points to go with five rebounds, three steals and four blocked shots. Ray'Sean Taylor scored 14 points and grabbed eight rebounds. while DeeJuan Pruitt' led the team with nine rebounds and scored 13 points. Terrance Thompson played only 12 minutes coming off the bench but scored eight points and had four rebounds. The win moves the SIUE record to 10-4, winning three straight and nine of its last 11 games. The 10-4 starts is the best for SIUE at the Division I level, and it is the earliest the Cougars have won 10 games since the 2004-05DeeJu team won its 10th game on December 19.

The Cougars shoot only 35% from the field during the first half at Southeast Missouri State but stayed within five points at halftime by going 11-11 from the free throw line. In the second half, SUIE upped its shooting to 46%, but allowed SEMO to lead by as many as 10 points on the way to an 82-73 win by missing ten of twentythree second half free throws and committing 15 turnovers for the game, including three in the last minute. Ray'Sean Taylor was tops of four Cougars scoring in double figure with 23 points. Lamar Wright had 12 points, and Shamar Wright and Damarco Minor both had 10, with Minor scoring all of his points on free throws.

Last season, Tennessee State beat SIUE three times and ended the Cougars' season in the first round of the OVC tournament. Opening with a 9-0 run, SIUE led this year's first rematch from start to finish. Each time the Tigers got close, the Cougars answered and widened the gap. SIUE led 40-34 at halftime. Answering TSU's challenges, the Cougars looked to be taking a decisive lead at 61-49 and their largest lead of the night, but the Tigers put on a 15-5 run that closed the score to 66-64 with four minutes left. The home team then allowed only four points in the next three minutes, while sinking free throw after free throw to extend the score to the final nine point margin and win the game 81-72. Both DeeJuan Pruitt' and Damarco Minor had "double doubles" for the game. Minor topped the scoring with 18 points and had 10 rebounds. Pruit had 13 rebound to go with his 16 points. Lamar Wright and Shamar Wright added 13 and 10 points. Ray'Sean Taylor and Terrance Thompson each added nine points. Taylor, having an off night shooting, led the team in assists, including two alley-oop passes to Pruitt.

It was the first meeting between SIUE and new OVC rival Southern Indiana since 2008. Striving to maintain its unbeaten home record, the Screaming Eagles hit five three-pointers early in the game for a 19-15 lead. The Cougars then scored ten straight for a 25-19 lead. After shutting down USI's long-distance shooting SIUE had a 35-29 halftime lead. The Cougars built their lead to fifteen at 57-42 before the home team had runs of 11-2 and 8-2 to get close, but the visitors held on for a 69-62 win. Damarco Minor had his second consecutive "double double" with career highs of 26 points and 11 rebounds and was a perfect 15-15 at the free throw line. Ray'Sean Taylor and DeeJuan Pruitt' scored 12 and 10 points. This was the Cougars twelfth win of the season, tying SIUE's record for most wins as a Division I team.

On January 9, the Ohio Valley Conference named Damarco Minor both the OVC Player of the Week and the OVC Newcomer of the Week for his play in games against Tennessee State and Southern Indiana.

SIUE rolled over Eastern Illinois 80-62 for its 13th win this season, the school's most wins in Division I. The two teams played even for the first half, but the Cougars opened the second with a 10-0 run. With their sixth win in seven game, SIUE took sole possession of first place in the OVC. Damarco Minor went to the free throw line with 4:23 left in the first and hit the first of two shots for his 47th consecutive free throw, setting the OVC record before missing his second shot, his first miss since the fourth game of the season. The Cougars took its first double-digit lead 48-37 with 14:48 to play on consecutive 3-pointers by Shamar Wright, and the Cougars kept a double-digit lead for the rest of the game as Wright scored 14 points. DeeJuan Pruitt continued his domination of the Panthers with his sixth career double-double--- a career-high 24 points and tying his season high 13 rebounds. EIU had pulled to within 11 when Minor was fouled with 9:34 to play; EIU coach Marty Simmons (a former SIUE head coach) disputed the call enough to earn a technical foul, and Minor hit all four free throws to push the Cougar lead to 61-46. Minor's 12 points and Ray'Sean Taylor's 11 gave the Cougars four scorers in double figures, with Lamar Wright missing a free throw for his tenth point immediately before fouling out. Taylor led the team with a season high 6 assists, "...big time," coach Brian Barone declared.

Located only 32 miles apart, their first meeting as Ohio Valley Conference opponents was their first since 2005, when SIUE was in Division II and Lindenwood in the NAIA. The Cougars led from start to finish in the 68-58 win, but the Lions kept them close in front of SIUE's largest home crowd of the season. The home team took several double digit leads (by as many as 14 points), but the visitors kept closing the gap. Ray'Sean Taylor led the Cougars with 18 points and five assists. Damarco Minor scored 16 and had nine rebounds. Shamar Wright added 11 points and five rebounds. Double-teamed the entire game, DeeJuan Pruitt scored only five points but got his season high thirteen rebounds for the third time.

The Morehead State Eagles were the preseason pick to win the OVC championship. They traveled to Edwardsville to show the league-leading SIUE Cougars why. The Eagles shot 56% with six 3 pointers to take a ten point halftime lead. Ray'Sean Taylor's season high 24 points and DeeJuan Pruitt's 11 could not offset the five Morehead State players in double figures. "There was a level of frustration throughout the game,". SIUE Head Coach Brian Barone said. "You feel like you string two or three plays together and it is still an eight or nine point game." Morehead shot 47 percent both from the field (22 of 46) and from the three-point line (9 of 19), while SIUE hit only 38 percent (20 of 52) from the field while being a perfect 11 of 11 from the free-throw line. Despite having their four game win streak snapped, the Cougars remain in first place in the OVC.

The Southern Indiana Screaming Eagles avenged its home loss to the Cougars by jumping to an 8-0 opening lead and hit eight first-half three-pointers to take a 38-22 halftime lead. SIUE shot only 35 percent for the game, while ISU shot 44. The Screaming Eagles held a double digit lead through most of the game. The Cougars able to close to only six points with just over two minutes left to play, but the visitors held on for the 82-72 win. SIUE was led in scoring with 19 points by both Ray'Sean Taylor and Shamar Wright. DeeJuan Pruitt's seventh career double-double with 10 points and a season-high 15 rebounds was more than offset by USI's Jacob Polakovich scoring 16 points and pulling down 23 rebounds while two other Eagles outscored him. The Cougars remain in first place in the OVC but are now in a six-way tie.

Thirty points and five steals by Ray'Sean Taylor and DeeJuan Pruitt's eighth career double-double were not enough to hold off hot shooting Tennessee Tech, who gave the Cougars their third consecutive loss.

The Cougars had a ten point lead midway through the second half when Morehead State's Mark Freeman scored 14 straight points as the Eagles 16-1 run put them in the lead on the way to handing SIUE its fourth straight loss.

Hosting OVC co-leader Tennessee Martin, the Cougars opened with a 14-2 blitz and never looked back on the way to snapping their four game losing streak. Ray'Sean Taylor again led the way with 27 points and 10 rebounds for his first double-double of the season, adding four assists and two steals to his stat line. Damarco Minor scored sixteen, and Shamar Wright scored his 1,000th career point on the way to his 15. DeeJuan Pruitt added another double-double with 11 points and 13 rebounds. The Skyhawks tried to get closer, but the Cougars repeatedly held them at bay, leading by as many as 28 before UT Martin was able to close to the final margin.

In the first ever meeting between the Cougars and the Little Rock Trojans, SIUE shot 56 percent (32-57) for the game and 47 percent (10-21) 3-point range, but the home team kept dropping 3s of their own (13-25). The Cougars led by as many as 15 with 16:19 to play, but the Trojans kept hitting their shots, cutting the margin to only five points with just over five minutes to go. With the score down to 81-79, Lamar Wright was intentionally fouled on a breakaway, but only a shooting foul was called on the intentional shove the pushed him off the floor. He missed both free throws, and the rebounder was fouled, then sinking two frees to tie the game 81-81 with only 2.1 seconds left. Shamar Wright inbounded to Ray'Sean Taylor at the far free throw line. Taylor took one dribble and put up a sixty foot shot that hit the back of the rim and dropped through the net for the 84-81 win. Damarco Minor led four Cougars in double figures with 23 points. Taylor had 21, DeeJuan Pruitt 13, and Shamar Wright 12.

For only the second time this season, the Cougars won after trailing at halftime. Lindenwood started out 12-2 and was up 16-5 just nine minutes into the game as SIUE suffered through a spate of unforced turnovers. After getting their act together, the Cougars closed to 30-28 at the break, and tied the game with the first basket of the second half, a DeeJuan Pruitt layup. SIUE took the lead at 38-36 with 16:21 to play and never trailed on the way to the 63-58 win. Damarco Minor had his fourth double-double with a game-high 19 points and 11 rebounds, and DeeJuan Pruitt had his sixth double-double of the season with 11 points and 12 rebounds after being held scoreless in the first half. Ray'Sean Taylor contributed 11 points, five rebounds and three assists. Lamar Wright and Terrance Thompson each scored seven points, with Wright adding four rebounds and a block and Thompson two rebounds and a block. The Cougars improved to 17-9 overall, 8-5 in the OVC, and 7-6 on the road--- all three victory marks are program highs in Division I.

The Eastern Illinois Panthers shot .567 from the field and .538 from 3 point range, and the Cougars were unable to counter, as Eastern fired shot after shot that swished through the nets. As SIUE fell to 17-10 overall and 8-6 in the OVC, Damarco Minor again led the scoring with 19 points. Shamar Wright added 17 and DeeJuan Pruitt 12.

Both teams started slowly but picked up the pace as the Cougars visited Tennessee Martin. SIUE ended up with a strong showing, but the home team came out on top, 90-84. Damarco Minor again led the scoring with 20 points, his fifth 20 point game of the season. Ray'Sean Taylor scored 18 points, with 13 in the second half. DeeJuan Pruitt had his seventh double-double performance this season with 12 points and 10 rebounds. Jalen Hodge added 13 points, one off his high as a Cougar.

The Cougars and Tennessee State started out pretty much playing even, but the Tigers' Junior Clay was on fire, scoring 40 points as he led his team to a 100-85 win. Shamar Wright led SIUE with a season-high 20 points as he moved up to No. 11 on SIUE's all-time scoring list. Ray'Sean Taylor added 17, Damarco Minor 15, and DeeJuan Pruitt 11.

== Roster ==
2022–23 SIU Edwardsville Cougars men's basketball team
Players
Coaches

Pos.	#	Name	Height	Weight	Year	Previous school	Hometown
G	0	Demarco Minor	6 ft 0 in (1.83 m)	180 lb (82 kg)	So	South Suburban College/Thornton Twp. HS	Chicago, IL
F	1	DeeJuan Pruitt	6 ft 8 in (2.03 m)	230 lb (104 kg)	RS So	Butler CC/Grant Union HS	Sacramento, CA
G	2	Desmond Polk	6 ft 4 in (1.93 m)	175 lb (79 kg)	RS So	Link Year Prep/La Lumiere School	Milwaukee, WI
G	3	Ray'Sean Taylor	6 ft 1 in (1.85 m)	175 lb (79 kg)	RS So	Collinsville HS	Collinsville, IL
G	4	Shamar Wright	6 ft 7 in (2.01 m)	185 lb (84 kg)	RS Jr	Link Year Prep/Murrieta Mesa HS	Memphis, TN
F	5	Dorion Staples	6 ft 7 in (2.01 m)	195 lb (88 kg)	Jr	Triton College/Massaponax HS	Fredericksburg, VA
G	10	Jalen Hodge	6 ft 1 in (1.85 m)	180 lb (82 kg)	GS	James Madison University/O'Fallon THS	O'Fallon, IL
C	12	Jonathan Kurtas	6 ft 10 in (2.08 m)	235 lb (107 kg)	So	Lake Norman Christian HS	Mooresville, NC
G	13	Quani Rudd	6 ft 5 in (1.96 m)	180 lb (82 kg)	So	Mt. Vernon THS	Mount Vernon, IL
G	14	Braden Wood	6 ft 3 in (1.91 m)	190 lb (86 kg)	Fr	Link Year Prep/Gunnison (CO) HS	Springfield, MO
G	20	Cobie Barnes	6 ft 7 in (2.01 m)	215 lb (98 kg)	Jr	John A. Logan College/Floyd Central HS	Floyds Knobs, IN
F	21	Terrance Thompson	6 ft 8 in (2.03 m)	225 lb (102 kg)	So	Navarro College/La Crosse Central HS	LaCrosse, WI
G	24	Cam Williams	6 ft 2 in (1.88 m)	190 lb (86 kg)	RS Sr	Hazelwood Central HS	St. Louis, MO
C	34	Arnas Sakenis (W)	6 ft 11 in (2.11 m)	240 lb (109 kg)	Fr	Andrew HS	Tinley Park, IL
F	55	Lamar Wright	6 ft 7 in (2.01 m)	185 lb (84 kg)	RS Jr	Link Year Prep/Murrieta Mesa HS	Memphis, TN

Head coach

- Brian Barone (Marquette)

Assistant coach(es)

- Colin Schneider (Green Bay)
- Terrance McGee (Missouri State)
- Kristof Kendrick (Western Michigan)
- Mike Waldo (SIUE)

Legend

- (C) Team captain
- (S) Suspended
- (I) Ineligible
- (W) Walk-on
- Injured
- Current redshirt

Roster
Last update: November 8, 2022

== Schedule and results ==
Source=

Date time, TV	Rank^{#}	Opponent^{#}	Result	Record	High points	High rebounds	High assists	Site (attendance) city, state
Exhibition
November 2, 2022*; 7:00 pm		Eureka	W 110–54	–	18 – Hodge	6 – 3 Tied	8 – Barnes	First Community Arena (565); Edwardsville, IL
Non-conference regular season
November 7, 2022*; 7:00 pm, ESPN+		Harris–Stowe	W 85–57	1–0	20 – Pruitt	10 – Pruitt	10 – Minor	First Community Arena (1,074); Edwardsville, IL
November 12, 2022*; 12:00 pm, ESPN+		at Purdue Fort Wayne	L 76–81	1–1	21 – Minor	8 – S. Wright	2 – Pruitt	Memorial Coliseum (1,374); Fort Wayne, IN
November 15, 2022*; 7:00 pm, ESPN+		at Missouri	L 80–105	1–2	16 – Taylor	8 – Minor	3 – Barnes	Mizzou Arena (8,241); Columbia, MO
November 18, 2022*; 6:30 pm, ESPN+		vs. Fairleigh Dickinson; JK54 Classic	W 79–78	2–2	22 – Minor	10 – Kurtis	2 – L. Wright	Willett Hall (173); Farmville, VA
November 19, 2022*; 6:30 pm, ESPN+		vs. VMI; JK54 Classic	W 93–67	3–2	24 – L. Wright	8 – Pruitt	11 – S. Wright	Willett Hall (132); Farmville, VA
November 20, 2022*; 12:30 pm, ESPN+		at Longwood; JK54 Classic	W 61–56	4–2	15 – Taylor	7 – Kurtas	3 – Taylor	Willett Hall (1,103); Farmville, VA
November 26, 2022*; 7:00 pm, Roos All-Access		at Kansas City	W 64–54	5–2	16 – S. Wright	10 – Pruitt	6 – Taylor	Swinney Recreation Center (735); Kansas City, MO
November 29, 2022*; 7:00 pm, ESPN+		St. Ambrose	W 89–54	6–2	15 – Thompson	7 – Barnes	4 – Taylor	First Community Arena (536); Edwardsville, IL
December 3, 2022*; 2:00 pm, ESPN+		Troy	W 78–72	7–2	21 – Taylor	8 – Taylor	4 – Minor	First Community Arena (727); Edwardsville, IL
December 6, 2022*; 7:00 pm, ESPN+		Bradley	L 54–56	7–3	11 – 2 Tied	5 – 2 Tied	5 – Minor	First Community Arena (1,516); Edwardsville, IL
December 10, 2022*; 3:00 pm, ESPN3		at Illinois State; Return to Horton	L 71–76	7–4	20 – Taylor	7 – Kurtas	5 – Minor	Horton Field House (3,420); Normal, IL
December 18, 2022*; 3:00 pm, ESPN+		Illinois Tech	W 93–78	8–4	20 – Taylor	6 – Hodge	6 – Minor	First Community Arena (632); Edwardsville, IL
December 21, 2022*; 7:00 pm, ESPN+		at Saint Louis	W 69–67	9–4	21 – Pruitt	12 – S.Wright	4 – S.Wright	Chaifetz Arena (7,876); St. Louis, MO
Ohio Valley Conference regular season
December 29, 2022; 7:30 pm, ESPN+		Tennessee Tech	W 64–51	10–4 (1–0)	18 – S. Wright	9 – Pruitt	5 – S.Wright	First Community Arena (956); Edwardsville, IL
December 31, 2022; 2:00 pm, ESPN+		at Southeast Missouri State	L 73–82	10–5 (1–1)	23 – Taylor	7 – Minor	3 – 2 Tied	Show Me Center (1,159); Cape Girardeau, MO
January 5, 2023; 6:00 pm, ESPNews		Tennessee State	W 81–72	11–5 (2–1)	18 – Minor	13 – Pruitt	5 – Taylor	First Community Arena (1,187); Edwardsville, IL
January 7, 2023; 7:30 pm, ESPN+		at Southern Indiana	W 69–62	12–5 (3–1)	27 – Minor	11 – Minor	5 – Pruitt	Screaming Eagles Arena (2,269); Evansville, IN
January 12, 2023; 7:30 pm, ESPN+		at Eastern Illinois	W 80–62	13–5 (4–1)	24 – Pruitt	13 – Pruitt	6 – Taylor	Lantz Arena (1,746); Charleston, IL
January 14, 2023; 5:30 pm, ESPN+		Lindenwood	W 68–58	14–5 (5–1)	18 – Taylor	13 – Pruitt	5 – Taylor	First Community Arena (1,839); Edwardsville, IL
January 19, 2023; 7:30 pm, ESPN+		Morehead State	L 58–67	14–6 (5–2)	24 – Taylor	9 – Pruitt	4 – 2 Tied	First Community Arena (1,880); Edwardsville, IL
January 21, 2023; 3:30 pm, ESPN+		Southern Indiana	L 72–82	14–7 (5–3)	19 – 2 Tied	15 – Pruitt	5 – Minor	First Community Arena (1,527); Edwardsville, IL
January 26, 2023; 7:30 pm, ESPN+		at Tennessee Tech	L 68–80	14–8 (5–4)	30 – Taylor	12 – Pruitt	3 – Pruitt	Eblen Center (1,913); Cookeville, TN
January 28, 2023; 2:00 pm, ESPN+		at Morehead State	L 50-55	14–9 (5–5)	14 – S. Wright	10 – Pruitt	2 – Tied	Ellis Johnson Arena (1,880); Morehead, KY
February 2, 2023; 6:00 pm, ESPN+		UT Martin	W 89–75	15–9 (6–5)	27 – Taylor	13 – Pruitt	4 – Taylor	First Community Arena (918); Edwardsville, IL
February 4, 2023; 3:30 pm, ESPN+		at Little Rock	W 84–81	16–9 (7–5)	23 – Minor	6 – Taylor	3 – Minor	Jack Stephens Center (2,763); Little Rock, AR
February 9, 2023; 8:00 pm, ESPN+		at Lindenwood	W 63–58	17–9 (8–5)	19 – Minor	12 – Pruitt	5 – Taylor	Hyland Performance Arena (2,132); St. Charles, MO
February 11, 2023; 3:30 pm, ESPN+		Eastern Illinois	L 73–84	17–10 (8–6)	19 – Minor	8 – Pruitt	4 – Taylor	First Community Arena (2,513); Edwardsville, IL
February 16, 2023; 8:00 pm, ESPN+		at UT Martin	L 84–90	17–11 (8–7)	20 – Minor	10 – Pruitt	4 – Tied	Skyhawk Arena (1,178); Martin, TN
February 18, 2023; 3:30 pm, ESPN+		at Tennessee State	L 85–100	17–12 (8–8)	20 – Wright	8 – Wright	3 – Tied	Gentry Complex (4,119); Nashville, TN
February 23, 2023; 7:30 pm, ESPN+		Little Rock	L 74–79	17–13 (8–9)	21 – Taylor	9 – Minor	5 – Taylor	First Community Arena (846); Edwardsville, IL
February 25, 2023; 3:30 pm, ESPN+		Southeast Missouri State	W 93–78	18–13 (9–9)	25 – Minor	8 – Pruitt	6 – Taylor	First Community Arena (1,818); Edwardsville, IL
Ohio Valley Conference Tournament
March 1, 2023*; 9:00 pm, ESPN+	(6)	vs. (7) Southern Indiana; First Round	W 68–54	19–13	27 – Minor	13 – Pruitt	3 – Hodge	Ford Center (1,650); Evansville, IN
March 2, 2023*; 9:00 pm, ESPN+	(6)	vs. (3) UT Martin; Quarterfinals	L 75–81	19–14	32 – Minor	9 – Minor	6 – Minor	Ford Center (968); Evansville, IN
*Non-conference game. ^{#}Rankings from AP Poll. (#) Tournament seedings in parentheses. All times are in Central Time; Source.
