= 2022–23 Morehead State Eagles men's basketball team =

American college basketball season

2022–23 Morehead State Eagles men's basketball

Ohio Valley regular season champions

NIT, Second Round
- Conference: Ohio Valley Conference
- Record: 22–12 (14–4 OVC)
- Head coach: Preston Spradlin (6th season)
- Assistant coaches: Scott Combs; Dominic Lombardi; Cason Burk
- Home arena: Ellis Johnson Arena

2022–23 Ohio Valley Conference men's basketball standings
| | Conf. | | | | Overall |
| Team | W | | L | PCT | W | | L | PCT |
|---|---|---|---|---|---|---|---|---|
| Morehead State | 14 | – | 4 | .778 | 22 | – | 12 | .647 |
| Tennessee Tech | 11 | – | 7 | .611 | 16 | – | 17 | .485 |
| UT Martin | 10 | – | 8 | .556 | 19 | – | 14 | .576 |
| Tennessee State | 10 | – | 8 | .556 | 18 | – | 14 | .563 |
| Southeast Missouri State † | 10 | – | 8 | .556 | 19 | – | 17 | .528 |
| SIU Edwardsville | 9 | – | 9 | .500 | 19 | – | 14 | .576 |
| Southern Indiana* | 9 | – | 9 | .500 | 16 | – | 17 | .485 |
| Lindenwood* | 6 | – | 12 | .333 | 11 | – | 21 | .344 |
| Little Rock | 6 | – | 12 | .333 | 10 | – | 21 | .323 |
| Eastern Illinois | 5 | – | 13 | .278 | 9 | – | 22 | .290 |
† 2023 OVC tournament winner * ineligible for the 2023 NCAA tournament due to transition period

The 2022–23 Morehead State Eagles men's basketball team represented Morehead State University in the 2022–23 NCAA Division I men's basketball season. The Eagles, led by sixth-year head coach Preston Spradlin, played their home games at Ellis Johnson Arena in Morehead, Kentucky as members of the Ohio Valley Conference. With a victory against Eastern Illinois on February 22, 2023, the Eagles clinched their first outright OVC regular season title since 1984. They lost to Southeast Missouri State in the OVC tournament semifinals. As a regular season conference champion who did not win their conference tournament, the Eagles received an automatic bid to the National Invitation Tournament, the school's first trip to the NIT. There, they upset No. 1-seed Clemson in the first round before losing to UAB in the second round.

== Previous season ==
The Eagles finished the 2021–22 season 23–11, 13–5 in OVC play to finish in third place. They defeated Tennessee Tech and Belmont, before falling to Murray State in the championship game of the OVC tournament.

== Roster ==
2022–23 Morehead State Eagles men's basketball team
Players
Coaches

| Pos. | # | Name | Height | Weight | Year | Previous school | Hometown |
|---|---|---|---|---|---|---|---|
| G | 0 | Mark Freeman | 5 ft 11 in (1.8 m) | 165 lb (75 kg) | Sr | Illinois State | Memphis, Tennessee |
| G | 1 | Tucson Redding | 6 ft 3 in (1.91 m) | 185 lb (84 kg) | So | Northeastern Oklahoma A&M | Aurora, Colorado |
| G | 2 | Jordan Lathon | 6 ft 4 in (1.93 m) | 205 lb (93 kg) | GS | Milwaukee | Grandview, Missouri |
| G | 3 | Drew Thelwell | 6 ft 3 in (1.91 m) | 185 lb (84 kg) | So | The Master's Academy | Orlando, Florida |
| G | 4 | Jalen Hawkins | 6 ft 2 in (1.88 m) | 190 lb (86 kg) | GS | Norfolk State | Bronx, New York |
| G | 5 | Branden Maughmer | 6 ft 3 in (1.91 m) | 195 lb (88 kg) | Sr | Cedarville | Chillicothe, Ohio |
| G | 10 | Brady Dingess | 6 ft 1 in (1.85 m) | 185 lb (84 kg) | Fr | Martin County High School (KY) | Inez, Kentucky |
| G | 11 | Trent Scott | 6 ft 4 in (1.93 m) | 175 lb (79 kg) | Fr | Alonso High School | Tampa, Florida |
| G | 12 | Julian Norris | 6 ft 3 in (1.91 m) | 180 lb (82 kg) | Fr | Link Academy | Evansville, Indiana |
| G | 14 | Chris Cole | 6 ft 6 in (1.98 m) | 205 lb (93 kg) | RS Fr | Brookwood High School | Lawrenceville, Georgia |
| G | 15 | Kalil Thomas | 6 ft 5 in (1.96 m) | 190 lb (86 kg) | Jr | UMass Lowell | New Orleans, Louisiana |
| G | 20 | Cole Villers | 6 ft 2 in (1.88 m) | 200 lb (91 kg) | Fr | Ashland Blazer High School | Ashland, Kentucky |
| F | 21 | Reis Jones | 6 ft 10 in (2.08 m) | 240 lb (109 kg) | Fr | Flint Hill School | Oxon Hill, Maryland |
| F | 22 | LJ Bryan | 6 ft 9 in (2.06 m) | 250 lb (113 kg) | Sr | State Fair Community College | Cheltenham, Maryland |
| G | 24 | Jake Wolfe | 6 ft 5 in (1.96 m) | 200 lb (91 kg) | RS Sr | Lipscomb | Aurora, Illinois |
| F | 45 | Alex Gross | 6 ft 10 in (2.08 m) | 250 lb (113 kg) | GS | Olivet Nazarene | Hope, Indiana |

Head coach

- Preston Spradlin (Alice Lloyd)

Assistant coach(es)

- Scott Combs (Austin Peay)
- Dominic Lombardi (Indiana (PA))
- Cason Burk (Jackson State)

Legend

- (C) Team captain
- (S) Suspended
- (I) Ineligible
- (W) Walk-on
- Injured
- Current redshirt

Roster
Last update: November 22, 2022

== Schedule and results ==
| Date time, TV | Rank^{#} | Opponent^{#} | Result | Record | Site (attendance) city, state |
Non-conference regular season
| November 7, 2022*; 7:00 pm, BTN+ | | at No. 13 Indiana | L 53–88 | 0–1 | Simon Skjodt Assembly Hall (17,222); Bloomington, IN |
| November 10, 2022*; 6:00 pm, ESPN+ | | CU–Harrodsburg | W 99–58 | 1–1 | Ellis Johnson Arena (1,011); Morehead, KY |
| November 12, 2022*; 8:00 pm, ESPN+ | | Bellarmine | W 62–55 | 2–1 | Ellis Johnson Arena (2,166); Morehead, KY |
| November 15, 2022*; 7:00 pm, ESPN+ | | at West Virginia | L 57–75 | 2–2 | WVU Coliseum (9,417); Morgantown, WV |
| November 18, 2022*; 7:00 pm, SECN+ | | at Vanderbilt | L 43–76 | 2–3 | Memorial Gymnasium (5,732); Nashville, TN |
| November 22, 2022*; 7:00 pm, ESPN+ | | Kentucky State | W 114–49 | 3–3 | Ellis Johnson Arena (1,356); Morehead, KY |
| November 26, 2022*; 7:00 pm, ESPN+ | | at Marshall | L 59–83 | 3–4 | Cam Henderson Center (4,315); Huntington, WV |
| November 29, 2022*; 7:00 pm, ESPN+ | | Kentucky Christian | W 109–62 | 4–4 | Ellis Johnson Arena (1,606); Morehead, KY |
| December 3, 2022*; 2:00 pm, ESPN+ | | North Alabama | L 75–81 | 4–5 | Ellis Johnson Arena (1,745); Morehead, KY |
| December 11, 2022*; 2:00 pm, ESPN+ | | East Tennessee State | W 61–57 | 5–5 | Ellis Johnson Arena (1,565); Morehead, KY |
| December 14, 2022*; 7:00 pm, ESPN+ | | at Georgia Southern | W 74–71 | 6–5 | Hanner Fieldhouse (501); Statesboro, GA |
| December 17, 2022*; 2:00 pm, ESPN+ | | at Mercer | L 52–79 | 6–6 | Hawkins Arena (1,572); Macon, GA |
| December 21, 2022*; 12:00 pm, ESPN+ | | Alice Lloyd | W 66–50 | 7–6 | Ellis Johnson Arena (1,065); Morehead, KY |
Ohio Valley regular season
| December 29, 2022; 9:00 pm, ESPN+ | | at Tennessee State | W 83–75 | 8–6 (1–0) | Gentry Complex (437); Nashville, TN |
| December 31, 2022; 4:30 pm, ESPN+ | | at UT Martin | L 57–64 | 8–7 (1–1) | Skyhawk Arena (1,302); Union City, TN |
| January 5, 2023; 7:00 pm, ESPN+ | | Southern Indiana | W 84–80 | 9–7 (2–1) | Ellis Johnson Arena (1,655); Morehead, KY |
| January 7, 2023; 3:00 pm, ESPN+ | | Eastern Illinois | W 69–59 | 10–7 (3–1) | Ellis Johnson Arena (1,464); Morehead, KY |
| January 12, 2023; 8:30 pm, ESPN+ | | at Tennessee Tech | L 62–79 | 10–8 (3–2) | Eblen Center (1,085); Cookeville, TN |
| January 14, 2023; 3:00 pm, ESPN+ | | Southeast Missouri State | L 86–91 | 10–9 (3–3) | Ellis Johnson Arena (1,740); Morehead, KY |
| January 19, 2023; 8:30 pm, ESPN+ | | at SIU Edwardsville | W 67–58 | 11–9 (4–3) | First Community Arena (1,334); Edwardsville, IL |
| January 21, 2023; 4:30 pm, ESPN+ | | at Lindenwood | W 72–63 | 12–9 (5–3) | Hyland Performance Arena (1,211); St. Charles, MO |
| January 26, 2023; 7:00 pm, ESPN+ | | Little Rock | W 76–72 | 13–9 (6–3) | Ellis Johnson Arena (1,557); Morehead, KY |
| January 28, 2023; 3:00 pm, ESPN+ | | SIU Edwardsville | W 55–50 | 14–9 (7–3) | Ellis Johnson Arena (1,880); Morehead, KY |
| February 2, 2023; 7:00 pm, ESPN+ | | Tennessee Tech | W 64–45 | 15–9 (8–3) | Ellis Johnson Arena (2,055); Morehead, KY |
| February 4, 2023; 4:30 pm, ESPN+ | | at Southern Indiana | W 71–66 ^{OT} | 16–9 (9–3) | Screaming Eagles Arena (3,644); Evansville, IN |
| February 9, 2023; 7:30 pm, ESPN+ | | at Little Rock | L 68–72 | 16–10 (9–4) | Jack Stephens Center (2,601); Little Rock, AR |
| February 11, 2023; 5:00 pm, ESPN+ | | at Southeast Missouri State | W 65–59 | 17–10 (10–4) | Show Me Center (2,890); Cape Girardeau, MO |
| February 16, 2023; 7:00 pm, ESPN+ | | Tennessee State | W 74–64 | 18–10 (11–4) | Ellis Johnson Arena (2,468); Morehead, KY |
| February 18, 2023; 3:00 pm, ESPN+ | | Lindenwood | W 71–58 | 19–10 (12–4) | Ellis Johnson Arena (2,788); Morehead, KY |
| February 22, 2023; 8:30 pm, ESPN+ | | at Eastern Illinois | W 69–63 | 20–10 (13–4) | Lantz Arena (1,625); Charleston, IL |
| February 25, 2023; 3:00 pm, ESPN+ | | UT Martin | W 72–58 | 21–10 (14–4) | Ellis Johnson Arena (2,672); Morehead, KY |
Ohio Valley tournament
| March 3, 2023; 8:00 pm, ESPNU | (1) | vs. (5) Southeast Missouri State; Semifinals | L 58–65 | 21–11 | Ford Center; Evansville, IN |
NIT
| March 15, 2023*; 7:00 pm, ESPN+ | | at (1) Clemson; First Round – Clemson Bracket | W 68–64 | 22–11 | Littlejohn Coliseum (2,697); Clemson, SC |
| March 19, 2023*; 2:00 pm, ESPN+ | | at (4) UAB; Second Round – Clemson Bracket | L 59–77 | 22–12 | Bartow Arena (2,624); Birmingham, AL |
*Non-conference game. ^{#}Rankings from AP Poll. (#) Tournament seedings in parentheses. All times are in Eastern.
