= 2022–23 Arkansas State Red Wolves men's basketball team =

Men's basketball team

2022–23 Arkansas State Red Wolves men's basketball
- Conference: Sun Belt Conference
- Record: 13–20 (4–14 Sun Belt)
- Head coach: Mike Balado (6th season)
- Assistant coaches: Brent Crews; Casey Stanley; Ian Young
- Home arena: First National Bank Arena

2022–23 Sun Belt Conference men's basketball standings
	Conf.				Overall
Team	W		L	PCT	W		L	PCT
Southern Miss	14	–	4	.778	25	–	8	.758
Louisiana †	13	–	5	.722	26	–	8	.765
Marshall	13	–	5	.722	24	–	8	.750
James Madison	12	–	6	.667	22	–	11	.667
Troy	11	–	7	.611	20	–	13	.606
Old Dominion	11	–	7	.611	19	–	12	.613
Georgia Southern	9	–	9	.500	17	–	16	.515
South Alabama	9	–	9	.500	19	–	16	.543
Appalachian State	9	–	9	.500	16	–	16	.500
Louisiana–Monroe	7	–	11	.389	11	–	21	.344
Texas State	6	–	12	.333	16	–	19	.457
Coastal Carolina	5	–	13	.278	11	–	20	.355
Arkansas State	4	–	14	.222	13	–	20	.394
Georgia State	3	–	15	.167	10	–	21	.323
† 2023 Sun Belt Tournament winner

The 2022–23 Arkansas State Red Wolves men's basketball team represented Arkansas State University in the 2022–23 NCAA Division I men's basketball season. The Red Wolves, led by sixth-year head coach Mike Balado, played their home games at the First National Bank Arena in Jonesboro, Arkansas as members of the Sun Belt Conference. They finished the season 13–20, 4–14 in Sun Belt play to finish in 13th place. They defeated Coastal Carolina in the first round of the Sun Belt tournament before losing to Troy in the second round.

On March 16, 2023, the school fired head coach Mike Balado. On March 22, the school named Alabama assistant coach Bryan Hodgson the team's new head coach.

== Previous season ==
The Red Wolves finished the 2021–21 season 18–11, 8–7 in Sun Belt play to finish in sixth place. They defeated Louisiana–Monroe in the first round of the Sun Belt tournament before losing to Georgia State in the quarterfinals.

== Offseason ==
=== Departures ===
Name	Number	Pos.	Height	Weight	Year	Hometown	Reason for departure
Desi Sills	3	G	6'2"	195	Junior	Jonesboro, AR	Transferred to Kansas State
Christian Willis	5	G	6'2"	195	Senior	Belleville, IL	Graduated
Lazar Grbovic	11	F	6'8"	230	Freshman	Belgrade, Serbia	Transferred to Moberly Area CC
Mario Fantina	13	G	6'4"	192	Freshman	Sveti Filip i Jakov, Croatia	Transferred to Arkansas–Monticello
Norchad Omier	15	F	6'7"	232	Freshman	Bluefields, Nicaragua	Transferred to Miami (FL)
Cheikh Ndour	21	F	6'7"	228	Freshman	Médina, Senegal	Walk-on; left the team for personal reasons
Keyon Wesley	22	F	6'9"	176	Junior	Chesilhurst, NJ	Transferred to Alabama State
Marquis Eaton	23	G	6'2'	202	Senior	Helena, AR	Graduated

=== Incoming transfers ===
Name	Number	Pos.	Height	Weight	Year	Hometown	Previous School
Mak Manciel	3	G	6'3"	197	Sophomore	Sterling Heights, MI	Henry Ford College
Alaaeddine Boutayeb	4	F	7'2"	226	Freshman	Casablanca, Morocco	Florida State
Detrick Reeves Jr.	5	G	6'3"	200	RS Sophomore	Marion, AR	John A. Logan College
Dylan Arnette	13	G	6'3"	188	RS Senior	DeSoto, TX	Western New Mexico
Omar El Sheik	22	F	6'8"	218	GS Senior	Giza, Egypt	Assumption
Julian Lual	23	F	6'6"	196	RS Junior	Calgary, AB	McCook Community College

=== 2022 recruiting class ===
College recruiting information
Name	Hometown	School	Height	Weight	Commit date
Izaiyah Nelson; PF	Marietta, GA	Marietta High School	6 ft 8 in (2.03 m)	175 lb (79 kg)	Oct 1, 2021
Izaiyah Nelson; PF	Recruit ratings: Rivals:				
Terrance Ford; PG	Brandenton, FL	Victory Rock Prep	6 ft 1 in (1.85 m)	165 lb (75 kg)	Nov 15, 2021
Terrance Ford; PG	Recruit ratings: No ratings found				
Overall recruit ranking:
Note: In many cases, Scout, Rivals, 247Sports, On3, and ESPN may conflict in their listings of height and weight.; In these cases, the average was taken. ESPN grades are on a 100-point scale.; Sources: "2022 Team Ranking". Rivals.

== Preseason ==
=== Preseason Sun Belt Conference poll ===
The Red Wolves were picked to finish in 12th place in the conference's preseason poll. Junior guard Caleb Fields was named preseason All-SBC Third Team.

Coaches poll
Predicted finish	Team (1st place Votes)
1	Louisiana - 190 (10)
2	Texas State - 162 (1)
3	South Alabama - 150 (1)
4	James Madison - 149 (1)
5	Georgia State - 127 (1)
6	Marshall - 122
7	App State - 120
8	Coastal Carolina - 100
9	Old Dominion - 93
10	Troy - 76
11	Georgia Southern - 69
12	Arkansas State - 48
13	Southern Miss - 34
14	ULM - 30

== Roster ==
2022–23 Arkansas State Red Wolves men's basketball team
Players
Coaches

Pos.	#	Name	Height	Weight	Year	Previous school	Hometown
G	0	Caleb Fields	6 ft 0 in (1.83 m)	186 lb (84 kg)	Jr	Aspire Basketball Academy	Lewisburg, Tennessee
G/F	1	Markise Davis	6 ft 8 in (2.03 m)	195 lb (88 kg)	Sr	Wallace State CC	Oxford, Alabama
G	2	Avery Felts (W)	6 ft 2 in (1.88 m)	190 lb (86 kg)	RS So	Westside HS	Jonesboro, Arkansas
G	3	Mak Manciel	6 ft 3 in (1.91 m)	197 lb (89 kg)	So	Henry Ford College	Detroit, Michigan
F	4	Alaaeddine Boutayeb	7 ft 2 in (2.18 m)	226 lb (103 kg)	Fr	Florida State	Casablanca, Morocco
G	5	Detrick Reeves Jr.	6 ft 3 in (1.91 m)	200 lb (91 kg)	RS So	John A. Logan College	Marion, Arkansas
G	10	Malcolm Farrington	6 ft 3 in (1.91 m)	202 lb (92 kg)	RS So	DME Academy	West Palm Beach, Florida
G	11	Terrance Ford Jr.	6 ft 1 in (1.85 m)	175 lb (79 kg)	Fr	Victory Rock Prep	Chicago, Illinois
G	12	Nicolas Tingling (W)	6 ft 1 in (1.85 m)	177 lb (80 kg)	So	Cardinal Newman HS	Port St. Lucie, Florida
G	13	Dylan Arnette (W)	6 ft 3 in (1.91 m)	188 lb (85 kg)	RS Sr	Western New Mexico	DeSoto, Texas
F	22	Omar El-Sheikh	6 ft 8 in (2.03 m)	218 lb (99 kg)	GS	Assumption	Cairo, Egypt
F	23	Julian Lual	6 ft 6 in (1.98 m)	196 lb (89 kg)	So	McCook Community College	Calgary, Alberta
G	24	Caleb London	6 ft 4 in (1.93 m)	195 lb (88 kg)	Fr	Conway HS	Memphis, Tennessee
G	33	Parker St. Pierre (W)	6 ft 1 in (1.85 m)	169 lb (77 kg)	Fr	Valley View HS	Jonesboro, Arkansas
F	35	Izaiyah Nelson	6 ft 10 in (2.08 m)	212 lb (96 kg)	Fr	Marietta HS	Marietta, Georgia
F	50	Antwon Jackson	6 ft 7 in (2.01 m)	280 lb (127 kg)	So	Clark HS	Las Vegas, Nevada

Head coach

- Mike Balado (St. Thomas)

Assistant coach(es)

- Brent Crews (Florida Atlantic)
- Casey Stanley (Iona)
- Ian Young (Auburn)

Legend

- (C) Team captain
- (S) Suspended
- (I) Ineligible
- (W) Walk-on
- Injured
- Current redshirt

Roster

== Schedule and results ==
Date time, TV	Rank^{#}	Opponent^{#}	Result	Record	High points	High rebounds	High assists	Site (attendance) city, state
Exhibition
November 2, 2022*; 7:00 p.m.		Voorhees (SC)	W 79–56		18 – El-Sheikh	9 – El-Sheikh	5 – Tied	First National Bank Arena (1,026); Jonesboro, AR
Non-conference regular season
November 7, 2022*; 7:00 p.m., ESPN+		Harding	W 86–55	1–0	16 – Felts	8 – El-Sheikh	7 – Felts	First National Bank Arena (3,092); Jonesboro, AR
November 12, 2022*; 5:00pm, SECN+/ESPN+		at LSU	L 52–61	1–1	17 – El-Sheikh	8 – El-Sheikh	4 – Fields	Pete Maravich Assembly Center (9,011); Baton Rouge, LA
November 14, 2022*; 7:00 p.m., ESPN+		Lyon College	W 82–58	2–1	16 – Tied	5 – Tied	9 – Felts	First National Bank Arena (1,387); Jonesboro, AR
November 18, 2022*; 8:00 p.m., ESPN+		at UC Davis	L 60–75	2–2	25 – Fields	8 – Nelson	2 – Tied	University Credit Union Center (1,125); Davis, CA
November 22, 2022*; 5:00 p.m., ESPN+		UT Martin; Arkansas State Multi-Team Event	W 70–64	3–2	17 – Fields	11 – El-Sheikh	7 – Fields	First National Bank Arena (3,686); Jonesboro, AR
November 25, 2022*; 7:00 p.m., ESPN+		Prairie View A&M; Arkansas State Multi-Team Event	L 59–67	3–3	15 – Tied	8 – El-Sheikh	5 – Fields	First National Bank Arena (2,495); Jonesboro, AR
November 27, 2022*; 2:00 p.m., ESPN+		Bethel (TN)	W 90–65	4–3	18 – Farrington	9 – El-Sheikh	7 – Fields	First National Bank Arena (2,380); Jonesboro, AR
December 1, 2022*; 7:00 p.m., ESPN+		Mississippi Valley State	W 58–38	5–3	15 – Farrington	9 – Nelson	5 – Felts	First National Bank Arena (2,274); Jonesboro, AR
December 6, 2022*; 7:00 p.m., ESPN+		at Central Arkansas	L 67–72	5–4	16 – Fields	10 – El-Sheikh	7 – Fields	Farris Center (2,385); Conway, AR
December 9, 2022*; 8:00 p.m., MW Network		at Air Force	L 55–80	5–5	14 – Felts	7 – El-Sheikh	5 – Fields	Clune Arena (1,119); Colorado Springs, CO
December 14, 2022*; 7:00 p.m., ESPN+		Southeast Missouri State	W 68–61	6–5	14 – Fields	14 – El-Sheikh	6 – Fields	First National Bank Arena (1,541); Jonesboro, AR
December 19, 2022*; 7:00 p.m., ESPN+		Alabama State	W 72–65	7–5	22 – Fields	10 – Nelson	5 – Ford Jr.	First National Bank Arena (2,072); Jonesboro, AR
December 22, 2022*; 2:00 p.m., ESPN+		Little Rock	W 77–75	8–5	25 – El-Sheikh	15 – El-Sheikh	5 – Ford Jr.	First National Bank Arena (1,378); Jonesboro, AR
Sun Belt Conference regular season
December 29, 2022; 6:00 p.m., ESPN+		at Old Dominion	W 60–57	9–5 (1–0)	18 – El-Sheikh	13 – El-Sheikh	4 – Fields	Chartway Arena (4,464); Norfolk, VA
December 31, 2022; 2:00 p.m., ESPN+		Louisiana–Monroe	L 72–84	9–6 (1–1)	18 – El-Sheikh	15 – El-Sheikh	8 – Fields	First National Bank Arena (2,347); Jonesboro, AR
January 5, 2023; 7:00 p.m., ESPN+		at South Alabama	L 45–63	9–7 (1–2)	18 – El-Sheikh	13 – El-Sheikh	2 – Fields	Mitchell Center (1,451); Mobile, AL
January 7, 2023; 4:00 p.m., ESPN+		at Troy	L 54–66	9–8 (1–3)	13 – Davis	11 – Davis	2 – Fields	Trojan Arena (2,972); Troy, AL
January 12, 2023; 7:00 p.m., ESPN+		Texas State	L 58–61	9–9 (1–4)	15 – Ford	9 – El-Sheikh	4 – Fields	First National Bank Arena (1,257); Jonesboro, AR
January 14, 2023; 2:00 p.m., ESPN+		Southern Miss	L 57–74	9–10 (1–5)	15 – Felts	11 – El-Sheikh	6 – Ford	First National Bank Arena (1,024); Jonesboro, AR
January 19, 2023; 7:00 p.m., ESPN+		Louisiana	L 71–80	9–11 (1–6)	14 – Ford	6 – El-Sheikh	6 – Fields	First National Bank Arena (1,132); Jonesboro, AR
January 21, 2023; 2:00 p.m., ESPN+		Marshall	L 78–87 ^{OT}	9–12 (1–7)	18 – Felts	15 – El-Sheikh	10 – Fields	First National Bank Arena (1,084); Jonesboro, AR
January 26, 2023; 7:00 p.m.		at Southern Miss	L 57–73	9–13 (1–8)	10 – Tied	6 – El-Sheikh	8 – Ford Jr.	Reed Green Coliseum (4,266); Hattiesburg, MS
January 28, 2023; 3:30 p.m., ESPN+		at Appalachian State	L 51–63	9–14 (1–9)	14 – El-Sheikh	10 – El-Sheikh	5 – Fields	Holmes Center (3,487); Boone, NC
February 2, 2023; 7:00 p.m., ESPN+		South Alabama	L 62–82	9–15 (1–10)	21 – Ford Jr.	11 – Nelson	4 – Ford Jr.	First National Bank Arena (1,341); Jonesboro, AR
February 4, 2023; 2:00 p.m., ESPN+		Coastal Carolina	W 73–57	10–15 (2–10)	19 – Fields	8 – Ford Jr.	3 – Tied	First National Bank Arena (1,402); Jonesboro, AR
February 9, 2023; 7:00 p.m.		at Texas State	L 62–66	10–16 (2–11)	19 – Davis	8 – El-Sheikh	6 – Fields	Strahan Coliseum (2,638); San Marcos, TX
February 11, 2023; 2:00 p.m.		at Georgia Southern	L 53–68	10–17 (2–12)	13 – Ford Jr.	11 – El-Sheikh	5 – Fields	Hanner Fieldhouse (1,727); Statesboro, GA
February 16, 2023; 7:30 p.m., ESPN+		Troy	L 62–67	10–18 (2–13)	16 – El-Sheikh	11 – El-Sheikh	4 – Fields	First National Bank Arena (1,026); Jonesboro, AR
February 18, 2023; 2:00 p.m., ESPN+		Georgia State	W 75–70	11–18 (3–13)	22 – Ford Jr.	12 – El-Sheikh	4 – Fields	First National Bank Arena; Jonesboro, AR
February 22, 2023; 7:00 p.m., ESPN+		at Louisiana	L 74–85	11–19 (3–14)	18 – Tied	13 – El-Sheikh	3 – Tied	Cajundome (2,615); Lafayette, LA
February 24, 2023; 6:30 p.m., ESPN+		at Louisiana–Monroe	W 64–61	12–19 (4–14)	15 – Fields	8 – Fields	8 – Fields	Fant–Ewing Coliseum (2,286); Monroe, LA
Sun Belt tournament
February 28, 2023; 5:00 p.m., ESPN+	(13)	vs. (12) Coastal Carolina; First Round	W 86–69	13–19	25 – Ford	15 – El-Sheikh	5 – Ford	Pensacola Bay Center; Pensacola, FL
March 2, 2023; 2:00 p.m., ESPN+	(13)	vs. (5) Troy; Second Round	L 59–63	13–20	21 – Davis	9 – Nelson	4 – Fields	Pensacola Bay Center; Pensacola, FL
*Non-conference game. ^{#}Rankings from AP Poll. (#) Tournament seedings in parentheses. All times are in Central.
