= 2022–23 Southeast Missouri State Redhawks men's basketball team =

American college basketball season

2022–23 Southeast Missouri State Redhawks men's basketball

OVC tournament champions

NCAA tournament, First Four
- Conference: Ohio Valley Conference
- Record: 19–17 (10–8 OVC)
- Head coach: Brad Korn (3rd season)
- Assistant coaches: Keith Pickens; J.R. Reynolds; Connor Wheeler
- Home arena: Show Me Center

2022–23 Ohio Valley Conference men's basketball standings
	Conf.				Overall
Team	W		L	PCT	W		L	PCT
Morehead State	14	–	4	.778	22	–	12	.647
Tennessee Tech	11	–	7	.611	16	–	17	.485
UT Martin	10	–	8	.556	19	–	14	.576
Tennessee State	10	–	8	.556	18	–	14	.563
Southeast Missouri State †	10	–	8	.556	19	–	17	.528
SIU Edwardsville	9	–	9	.500	19	–	14	.576
Southern Indiana*	9	–	9	.500	16	–	17	.485
Lindenwood*	6	–	12	.333	11	–	21	.344
Little Rock	6	–	12	.333	10	–	21	.323
Eastern Illinois	5	–	13	.278	9	–	22	.290
† 2023 OVC tournament winner * ineligible for the 2023 NCAA tournament due to transition period

The 2022–23 Southeast Missouri State Redhawks men's basketball team represented Southeast Missouri State University in the 2022–23 NCAA Division I men's basketball season. The Redhawks, led by third-year head coach Brad Korn, played their home games at the Show Me Center in Cape Girardeau, Missouri as members of the Ohio Valley Conference. They finished the season 19–17, 10–8 in OVC play to finish a three-way tie for third place. As No. 5 seed in the OVC tournament, they defeated Lindenwood, Tennessee State, Moorehead State, and Tennessee Tech to win the conference championship. As a result, they received the conference's automatic bid to the NCAA tournament for the second time in school history and first since 2000. As a No. 16 seed in the South region, they lost to Texas A&M–Corpus Christi in the First Four.

== Previous season ==
The Redhawks finished the 2021–22 season 14–18, 8–9 in OVC play to finish in fourth place. They defeated Tennessee State in the quarterfinals of the OVC tournament, before falling to Murray State in the semifinals.

== Roster ==
2022–23 Southeast Missouri State Redhawks men's basketball team
Players
Coaches

Pos.	#	Name	Height	Weight	Year	Previous school	Hometown
G	0	Israel Barnes	6 ft 4 in (1.93 m)	185 lb (84 kg)	RS Sr	Newman	Wichita, Kansas
G	1	Phillip Russell	5 ft 10 in (1.78 m)	165 lb (75 kg)	So	Saint Louis	St. Louis, Missouri
G	3	Aquan Smart	6 ft 3 in (1.91 m)	175 lb (79 kg)	So	FIU	Evanston, Illinois
F	4	Adam Larson	6 ft 9 in (2.06 m)	180 lb (82 kg)	RS Fr	Fennimore HS	Fennimore, Wisconsin
G	5	Chris Harris	6 ft 3 in (1.91 m)	205 lb (93 kg)	RS Sr	John A. Logan College	Antioch, Illinois
C	10	David Idada	7 ft 0 in (2.13 m)	250 lb (113 kg)	Fr	Golden State Prep	Barendrecht, Netherlands
G	11	Evan Eursher	6 ft 2 in (1.88 m)	177 lb (80 kg)	Fr	The Webb School	Hendersonville, Tennessee
G	12	Tevin Gowins	5 ft 9 in (1.75 m)	167 lb (76 kg)	Fr	Hazelwood Central HS	Florissant, Missouri
C	14	Nate Johnson	6 ft 9 in (2.06 m)	250 lb (113 kg)	Sr	Seminole State College	Broward County, Florida
F	15	Josh Mitchell	6 ft 8 in (2.03 m)	215 lb (98 kg)	So	Northeast Mississippi CC	Tupelo, Mississippi
F	21	Josh Earley	6 ft 7 in (2.01 m)	242 lb (110 kg)	Jr	Tulsa	Shawnee Mission, Kansas
G	22	Gavyn Elkamil	6 ft 5 in (1.96 m)	190 lb (86 kg)	So	Tulsa	Pittsburg, Kansas
F	24	Kobe Clark	6 ft 6 in (1.98 m)	180 lb (82 kg)	So	Georgetown	St. Louis, Missouri
G	33	Dylan Branson	6 ft 5 in (1.96 m)	220 lb (100 kg)	So	Mehlville HS	St. Louis, Missouri
C	35	Mason Hanback	7 ft 0 in (2.13 m)	245 lb (111 kg)	Fr	Tennessee Prep	Jackson, Tennessee

Head coach

- Brad Korn (Southern Illinois)

Assistant coach(es)

- Keith Pickens (Missouri State)
- J.R. Reynolds (Eastern Illinois)
- Connor Wheeler (SIU Edwardsville)

Legend

- (C) Team captain
- (S) Suspended
- (I) Ineligible
- (W) Walk-on
- Injured
- Current redshirt

Roster
Last update: November 29, 2022

== Schedule and results ==
Date time, TV	Rank^{#}	Opponent^{#}	Result	Record	Site (attendance) city, state
Exhibition
October 25, 2022*; 6:30 pm		Fontbonne	W 67–52	–	Show Me Center (225); Cape Girardeau, MO
October 30, 2022*; 2:00 pm		Aurora	W 84–51	–	Show Me Center (245); Cape Girardeau, MO
Non-conference regular season
November 7, 2022*; 7:00 pm, ESPN+		at South Florida	W 64–61	1–0	Yuengling Center (4,046); Tampa, FL
November 12, 2022*; 4:00 pm, ESPN+		Lyon College	W 83–46	2–0	Show Me Center (683); Cape Girardeau, MO
November 16, 2022*; 7:00 pm, ESPN+		at Evansville	W 67–61	3–0	Ford Center (3,756); Evansville, IN
November 19, 2022*; 3:00 pm, ESPN+		at Bradley	L 60–73	3–1	Carver Arena (4,826); Peoria, IL
November 22, 2022*; 6:30 pm, ESPN+		William Woods	W 87–49	4–1	Show Me Center (784); Cape Girardeau, MO
November 26, 2022*; 1:00 pm		vs. Boston University; Cream City Classic	W 63–52	5–1	Klotsche Center; Milwaukee, WI
November 27, 2022*; 12:00 pm		vs. UC Davis; Cream City Classic	L 71–73	5–2	Klotsche Center; Milwaukee, WI
November 28, 2022*; 7:00 pm, ESPN+		at Milwaukee; Cream City Classic	L 68–84	5–3	Klotsche Center (1,183); Milwaukee, WI
December 4, 2022*; 3:00 pm, SECN+		at Missouri	L 89–96	5–4	Mizzou Arena (8,873); Columbia, MO
December 7, 2022*; 7:00 pm, ESPN+		Purdue Fort Wayne	L 68–89	5–5	Show Me Center (1,155); Cape Girardeau, MO
December 14, 2022*; 7:00 pm, ESPN+		at Arkansas State	L 61–68	5–6	First National Bank Arena (1,541); Jonesboro, AR
December 17, 2022*; 7:30 pm, BTN		at Iowa	L 75–106	5–7	Carver–Hawkeye Arena (11,240); Iowa City, IA
December 21, 2022*; 6:30 pm, ESPN+		Southern Illinois	L 68–70	5–8	Show Me Center (1,632); Cape Girardeau, MO
Ohio Valley regular season
December 29, 2022; 7:30 pm, ESPN+		at Southern Indiana	L 81–86	5–9 (0–1)	Screaming Eagles Arena (3,110); Evansville, IN
December 31, 2022; 2:00 pm, ESPN+		SIU Edwardsville	W 82–73	6–9 (1–1)	Show Me Center (1,159); Cape Girardeau, MO
January 5, 2023; 8:00 pm, ESPN+		at UT Martin	L 82–87	6–10 (1–2)	Skyhawk Arena (1,180); Union City, TN
January 7, 2023; 3:30 pm, ESPN+		at Little Rock	W 74–68	7–10 (2–2)	Jack Stephens Center (2,135); Little Rock, AR
January 12, 2023; 7:00 pm, ESPN+		Lindenwood	W 94–71	8–10 (3–2)	Show Me Center (875); Cape Girardeau, MO
January 14, 2023; 2:00 pm, ESPN+		at Morehead State	W 91–86	9–10 (4–2)	Ellis Johnson Arena (1,740); Morehead, KY
January 19, 2023; 7:00 pm, ESPN+		UT Martin	L 60–80	9–11 (4–3)	Show Me Center (1,115); Cape Girardeau, MO
January 21, 2023; 4:00 pm, ESPN+		Tennessee Tech	W 84–77 ^{2OT}	10–11 (5–3)	Show Me Center (2,632); Cape Girardeau, MO
January 26, 2023; 7:00 pm, ESPN+		Tennessee State	W 92–75	11–11 (6–3)	Show Me Center (1,857); Cape Girardeau, MO
January 28, 2023; 3:30 pm, ESPN+		at Eastern Illinois	W 79–68	12–11 (7–3)	Lantz Arena (1,515); Charleston, IL
February 2, 2023; 7:00 pm, ESPN+		Little Rock	W 99–98	13–11 (8–3)	Show Me Center (1,290); Cape Girardeau, MO
February 4, 2023; 3:00 pm, ESPN+		at Tennessee Tech	L 80–82	13–12 (8–4)	Eblen Center (1,476); Cookeville, TN
February 9, 2023; 8:00 pm, ESPN+		at Tennessee State	L 65–85	13–13 (8–5)	Gentry Complex (6,691); Nashville, TN
February 11, 2023; 4:00 pm, ESPN+		Morehead State	L 59–65	13–14 (8–6)	Show Me Center (2,890); Cape Girardeau, MO
February 16, 2023; 7:00 pm, ESPN+		Eastern Illinois	W 78–64	14–14 (9–6)	Show Me Center (2,124); Cape Girardeau, MO
February 18, 2023; 4:00 pm, ESPN+		Southern Indiana	W 85–80	15–14 (10–6)	Show Me Center (2,340); Cape Girardeau, MO
February 23, 2023; 8:00 pm, ESPN+		at Lindenwood	L 102–105 ^{2OT}	15–15 (10–7)	Hyland Performance Arena (2,119); St. Charles, MO
February 25, 2023; 3:30 pm, ESPN+		at SIU Edwardsville	L 78–93	15–16 (10–8)	First Community Arena; Edwardsville, IL
Ohio Valley Tournament
March 1, 2023; 6:00 pm, ESPN+	(5)	vs. (8) Lindenwood; First round	W 84–65	16–16	Ford Center; Evansville, IN
March 2, 2023; 6:30 pm, ESPN+	(5)	vs. (4) Tennessee State; Quarterfinals	W 91–83	17–16	Ford Center; Evansville, IN
March 3, 2023; 7:00 pm, ESPNU	(5)	vs. (1) Morehead State; Semifinals	W 65–58	18–16	Ford Center; Evansville, IN
March 4, 2023; 7:00 pm, ESPN2	(5)	vs. (2) Tennessee Tech; Championship	W 89–82 ^{OT}	19–16	Ford Center; Evansville, IN
NCAA tournament
March 14, 2023*; 5:40 pm, TruTV	(16 S)	vs. (16 S) Texas A&M–Corpus Christi; First Four	L 71–75	19–17	UD Arena; Dayton, OH
*Non-conference game. ^{#}Rankings from AP Poll. (#) Tournament seedings in parentheses. S=South. All times are in Central.
