= 2022–23 Eastern Illinois Panthers men's basketball team =

American college basketball season

2022–23 Eastern Illinois Panthers men's basketball
- Conference: Ohio Valley Conference
- Record: 9–22 (5–13 OVC)
- Head coach: Marty Simmons (2nd season)
- Associate head coach: Doug Novsek
- Assistant coaches: Justin Walker; Quinn Peterson
- Home arena: Lantz Arena

2022–23 Ohio Valley Conference men's basketball standings
	Conf.				Overall
Team	W		L	PCT	W		L	PCT
Morehead State	14	–	4	.778	22	–	12	.647
Tennessee Tech	11	–	7	.611	16	–	17	.485
UT Martin	10	–	8	.556	19	–	14	.576
Tennessee State	10	–	8	.556	18	–	14	.563
Southeast Missouri State †	10	–	8	.556	19	–	17	.528
SIU Edwardsville	9	–	9	.500	19	–	14	.576
Southern Indiana*	9	–	9	.500	16	–	17	.485
Lindenwood*	6	–	12	.333	11	–	21	.344
Little Rock	6	–	12	.333	10	–	21	.323
Eastern Illinois	5	–	13	.278	9	–	22	.290
† 2023 OVC tournament winner * ineligible for the 2023 NCAA tournament due to transition period

The 2022–23 Eastern Illinois Panthers men's basketball team represented Eastern Illinois University in the 2022–23 NCAA Division I men's basketball season. The Panthers, led by second-year head coach Marty Simmons, played their home games at Lantz Arena in Charleston, Illinois as members of the Ohio Valley Conference (OVC). They finished the season 9–22, 5–13 in OVC play, to finish in last place. They failed to qualify for the OVC tournament.

On December 21, 2022, the Panthers defeated Iowa, marking the team's fourth win over a Power Five school in program history.

== Previous season ==
The Panthers finished the 2021–22 season 5–26, 3–15 in OVC play, to finish in last place. They failed to qualify for the OVC tournament.

== Roster ==
2022–23 Eastern Illinois Panthers men's basketball team
Players
Coaches

Pos.	#	Name	Height	Weight	Year	Hometown
G	1	CJ Lane	6 ft 5 in (1.96 m)	195 lb (88 kg)	Sr	Eatonville, FL
F	2	Paul Bizimana	6 ft 9 in (2.06 m)	215 lb (98 kg)	So	Haltom City, TX
G	3	Cameron Haffner	6 ft 2 in (1.88 m)	180 lb (82 kg)	Fr	Westfield, IN
G	4	Yaakema Jr. Rose	5 ft 9 in (1.75 m)	185 lb (84 kg)	GS	Springfield, IL
F	5	Sincere Malone	6 ft 8 in (2.03 m)	210 lb (95 kg)	Fr	Chicago, IL
G	10	Kinyon Hodges	6 ft 2 in (1.88 m)	180 lb (82 kg)	Jr	Cape Girardeau, MO
C	11	Nick Ellington	6 ft 8 in (2.03 m)	220 lb (100 kg)	Jr	St. Louis, MO
G	13	Kyle Carlesimo	6 ft 2 in (1.88 m)	185 lb (84 kg)	Fr	Seattle, WA
G	20	Caleb Donaldson	6 ft 5 in (1.96 m)	195 lb (88 kg)	Jr	Rockton, IL
F	22	Luke Light	6 ft 8 in (2.03 m)	205 lb (93 kg)	Fr	Surprise, AZ
F	23	Rodolfo Bolis	6 ft 8 in (2.03 m)	240 lb (109 kg)	So	Espírito Santo, Brazil
C	24	Kyle Thomas	6 ft 10 in (2.08 m)	240 lb (109 kg)	Fr	Bolingbrook, IL
G	25	Dan Luers	6 ft 5 in (1.96 m)	210 lb (95 kg)	So	Lebanon, OH
F	34	Jermaine Hamlin	6 ft 10 in (2.08 m)	235 lb (107 kg)	Sr	Lincoln, IL

Head coach

- Marty Simmons (Evansville)

Assistant coach(es)

- Doug Novsek (Southern Illinois)
- Justin Walker (Eastern Illinois)
- Quinn Peterson (DePaul)

Legend

- (C) Team captain
- (S) Suspended
- (I) Ineligible
- (W) Walk-on
- Injured
- Current redshirt

Roster
Last update: December 29, 2022

== Schedule and results ==
Date time, TV	Rank^{#}	Opponent^{#}	Result	Record	Site (attendance) city, state
Non-conference regular season
November 7, 2022*; 8:00 p.m., ESPNU		at No. 23 Illinois	L 57–87	0–1	State Farm Center (12,938); Champaign, IL
November 10, 2022*; 7:00 p.m., ESPN+		Illinois State	L 49–54	0–2	Lantz Arena (1,385); Charleston, IL
November 13, 2022*; 1:00 p.m., ESPN+		at Central Michigan	L 60–76	0–3	McGuirk Arena (1,162); Mount Pleasant, MI
November 16, 2022*; 6:00 p.m., BTN		at Ohio State	L 43–65	0–4	Value City Arena (8,350); Columbus, OH
November 21, 2022*; 12:00 p.m., ESPN+		Saint Mary-of-the-Woods	W 102–40	1–4	Lantz Arena (2,185); Charleston, IL
November 25, 2022*; 1:00 p.m., ESPN3		at Ohio; Bobcat Battle	L 67–78	1–5	Convocation Center (3,982); Athens, OH
November 26, 2022*; 1:00 p.m., YouTube		vs. Alabama State; Bobcat Battle	L 58–67	1–6	Convocation Center (126); Athens, OH
November 30, 2022*; 7:00 p.m., ESPN+		Northern Illinois	L 70–90	1–7	Lantz Arena (1,651); Charleston, IL
December 3, 2022*; 6:00 p.m., ESPN+		Blackburn	W 93–43	2–7	Lantz Arena (921); Charleston, IL
December 7, 2022*; 7:00 p.m., ESPN+		Ball State	L 59–76	2–8	Lantz Arena (1,636); Charleston, IL
December 10, 2022*; 2:00 p.m., ESPN+		Western Illinois	L 75–79	2–9	Lantz Arena (1,137); Charleston, IL
December 17, 2022*; 11:00 am, ESPN+		at IUPUI	W 70–59	3–9	Indiana Farmers Coliseum (734); Indianapolis, IN
December 21, 2022*; 2:30 p.m., BTN+		at Iowa	W 92–83	4–9	Carver–Hawkeye Arena (10,553); Iowa City, IA
OVC regular season
December 29, 2022; 7:30 p.m., ESPN+		Lindenwood	W 55–54	5–9 (1–0)	Lantz Arena (854); Charleston, IL
December 31, 2022; 3:30 p.m., ESPN+		Southern Indiana	W 91–80	6–9 (2–0)	Lantz Arena (1,125); Charleston, IL
January 5, 2023; 7:30 p.m., ESPN+		at Tennessee Tech	L 49–70	6–10 (2–1)	Eblen Center (1,323); Cookeville, TN
January 7, 2023; 2:00 p.m., ESPN+		at Morehead State	L 59–69	6–11 (2–2)	Ellis Johnson Arena (1,464); Morehead, KY
January 12, 2023; 7:30 p.m., ESPN+		SIU Edwardsville	L 62–80	6–12 (2–3)	Lantz Arena (1,746); Charleston, IL
January 14, 2023; 3:30 p.m., ESPN+		Little Rock	W 70–63	7–12 (3–3)	Lantz Arena (1,363); Charleston, IL
January 19, 2023; 8:00 p.m., ESPN+		at Tennessee State	L 74–78	7–13 (3–4)	Gentry Complex (6,331); Nashville, TN
January 21, 2023; 3:30 p.m., ESPN+		at UT Martin	L 78–91	7–14 (3–5)	Skyhawk Arena (1,437); Union City, TN
January 26, 2023; 7:30 p.m., ESPN+		at Southern Indiana	L 74–78	7–15 (3–6)	Screaming Eagles Arena (2,136); Evansville, IN
January 28, 2023; 3:30 p.m., ESPN+		Southeast Missouri State	L 68–79	7–16 (3–7)	Lantz Arena (1,515); Charleston, IL
February 2, 2023; 8:00 p.m., ESPN+		at Lindenwood	L 67–80	7–17 (3–8)	Hyland Performance Arena (1,574); St. Charles, MO
February 4, 2023; 3:30 p.m., ESPN+		Tennessee State	L 61–65	7–18 (3–9)	Lantz Arena (1,528); Charleston, IL
February 9, 2023; 7:30 p.m., ESPN+		UT Martin	W 77–75	8–18 (4–9)	Lantz Arena (1,908); Charleston, IL
February 11, 2023; 3:30 p.m., ESPN+		at SIU Edwardsville	W 84–73	9–18 (5–9)	First Community Arena (2,513); Edwardsville, IL
February 16, 2023; 7:00 p.m., ESPN+		at Southeast Missouri State	L 64–78	9–19 (5–10)	Show Me Center (2,124); Cape Girardeau, MO
February 18, 2023; 3:30 p.m., ESPN+		at Little Rock	L 77–81	9–20 (5–11)	Jack Stephens Center (3,001); Little Rock, AR
February 22, 2023; 7:30 p.m., ESPN+		Morehead State	L 63–69	9–21 (5–12)	Lantz Arena (1,625); Charleston, IL
February 25, 2023; 3:30 p.m., ESPN+		Tennessee Tech	L 66–75	9–22 (5–13)	Lantz Arena (1,923); Charleston, IL
*Non-conference game. ^{#}Rankings from AP poll. (#) Tournament seedings in parentheses. All times are in Central.
