= 2022–23 UT Martin Skyhawks men's basketball team =

American college basketball season

2022–23 UT Martin Skyhawks men's basketball
- Conference: Ohio Valley Conference
- Record: 19–14 (10–8 OVC)
- Head coach: Ryan Ridder (2nd season)
- Assistant coaches: Denver Cobb; Erik Buggs; Reed Ridder
- Home arena: Skyhawk Arena

2022–23 Ohio Valley Conference men's basketball standings
	Conf.				Overall
Team	W		L	PCT	W		L	PCT
Morehead State	14	–	4	.778	22	–	12	.647
Tennessee Tech	11	–	7	.611	16	–	17	.485
UT Martin	10	–	8	.556	19	–	14	.576
Tennessee State	10	–	8	.556	18	–	14	.563
Southeast Missouri State †	10	–	8	.556	19	–	17	.528
SIU Edwardsville	9	–	9	.500	19	–	14	.576
Southern Indiana*	9	–	9	.500	16	–	17	.485
Lindenwood*	6	–	12	.333	11	–	21	.344
Little Rock	6	–	12	.333	10	–	21	.323
Eastern Illinois	5	–	13	.278	9	–	22	.290
† 2023 OVC tournament winner * ineligible for the 2023 NCAA tournament due to transition period

The 2022–23 UT Martin Skyhawks men's basketball team represented the University of Tennessee at Martin in the 2022–23 NCAA Division I men's basketball season. The Skyhawks, led by second-year head coach Ryan Ridder, played their home games at Skyhawk Arena in Martin, Tennessee as members of the Ohio Valley Conference. They finished the season 19–14, 10–8 in OVC play to finish in a tie for third place. As the No. 3 seed in the OVC tournament, they defeated SIU Edwardsville before losing Tennessee Tech in the semifinals.

== Previous season ==
The Skyhawks finished the 2021–22 season 8–22, 4–14 in OVC play to finish in ninth place. Since only the top eight teams make the tournament, they failed to qualify for the OVC tournament.

== Roster ==
2022–23 UT Martin Skyhawks men's basketball team
Players
Coaches

Pos.	#	Name	Height	Weight	Year	Hometown
F	0	KK Curry	6 ft 6 in (1.98 m)	205 lb (93 kg)	Jr	Cleveland, Tennessee
G	1	Koby Jeffries	6 ft 3 in (1.91 m)	190 lb (86 kg)	RS So	Memphis, Tennessee
G	2	KJ Simon	6 ft 3 in (1.91 m)	195 lb (88 kg)	Sr	Orlando, Florida
G	3	Jordan Sears	5 ft 11 in (1.8 m)	175 lb (79 kg)	So	Daytona Beach, Florida
F	4	Josh Endicott	6 ft 9 in (2.06 m)	205 lb (93 kg)	Sr	Baxter, Tennessee
F	5	Chris Nix	6 ft 9 in (2.06 m)	220 lb (100 kg)	Jr	Bellevue, Tennessee
G	10	Desmond Williams	6 ft 1 in (1.85 m)	180 lb (82 kg)	Jr	Montgomery, Alabama
G	11	Grant Hurst	6 ft 2 in (1.88 m)	180 lb (82 kg)	So	Cleveland, Tennessee
G	13	Dylan Pumpian	6 ft 1 in (1.85 m)	175 lb (79 kg)	So	Marietta, Georgia
F	20	Josiah Morris	6 ft 6 in (1.98 m)	215 lb (98 kg)	So	Mount Washington, Kentucky
F	22	Rifen Miguel	6 ft 8 in (2.03 m)	240 lb (109 kg)	Sr	Luanda, Angola
F	23	Jalen Myers	6 ft 8 in (2.03 m)	195 lb (88 kg)	So	Madison, Alabama
G	45	Parker Stewart	6 ft 5 in (1.96 m)	205 lb (93 kg)	GS	Union City, Tennessee
F	55	David Kamwanga	6 ft 7 in (2.01 m)	220 lb (100 kg)	So	Kinshasa, Democratic Republic of the Congo

Head coach

- Ryan Ridder (Embry–Riddle)

Assistant coach(es)

- Denver Cobb (Embry–Riddle)
- Erik Buggs (Valparaiso)
- Reed Ridder (Embry–Riddle)

Legend

- (C) Team captain
- (S) Suspended
- (I) Ineligible
- (W) Walk-on
- Injured
- Current redshirt

Roster
Last update: November 30, 2022

== Schedule and results ==
Date time, TV	Rank^{#}	Opponent^{#}	Result	Record	Site (attendance) city, state
Non-conference regular season
November 7, 2022*; 6:00 pm, ACCNX/ESPN+		at Pittsburgh	L 58–80	0–1	Petersen Events Center (6,055); Pittsburgh, PA
November 9, 2022*; 6:00 pm, ESPN+		at Youngstown State	L 72–90	0–2	Beeghly Center (1,753); Youngstown, OH
November 12, 2022*; 2:00 pm, ESPN+		Champion Christian	W 124–65	1–2	Skyhawk Arena (1,146); Martin, TN
November 15, 2022*; 6:00 pm, ESPN+		Harris–Stowe	W 96–53	2–2	Skyhawk Arena (1,063); Martin, TN
November 18, 2022*; 6:30 pm, SECN+/ESPN+		at Ole Miss	L 68–72	2–3	SJB Pavilion (5,024); Oxford, MS
November 20, 2022*; 2:00 pm, ESPN+		Prairie View A&M	W 80–79	3–3	Skyhawk Arena (1,037); Martin, TN
November 22, 2022*; 5:00 pm, ESPN+		at Arkansas State	L 64–70	3–4	First National Bank Arena (3,686); Jonesboro, AR
November 28, 2022*; 6:00 pm, ESPN+		McNeese State	W 86–83	4–4	Skyhawk Arena (1,104); Martin, TN
December 3, 2022*; 1:00 pm, ESPN+		at UNC Asheville	L 83–90	4–5	Kimmel Arena (908); Asheville, NC
December 11, 2022*; 2:00 pm, ESPN+		Chicago State	W 75–74 ^{OT}	5–5	Skyhawk Arena (1,099); Martin, TN
December 13, 2022*; 11:00 am, ESPN+		Bethel	W 103–75	6–5	Skyhawk Arena (3,572); Martin, TN
December 17, 2022*; 1:00 pm, ESPN3		at Bowling Green	W 75–67	7–5	Stroh Center (1,439); Bowling Green, OH
December 19, 2022*; 6:00 pm, ESPN+		Crowley's Ridge	W 120–59	8–5	Skyhawk Arena (1,066); Martin, TN
Ohio Valley regular season
December 29, 2022; 7:30 pm		at Little Rock	L 74–88	8–6 (0–1)	Simmons Bank Arena (2,709); North Little Rock, AR
December 31, 2022; 3:30 pm, ESPN+		Morehead State	W 64–57	9–6 (1–1)	Skyhawk Arena (1,302); Martin, TN
January 5, 2023; 8:00 pm, ESPN+		Southeast Missouri State	W 87–82	10–6 (2–1)	Skyhawk Arena (1,180); Martin, TN
January 7, 2023; 3:30 pm, ESPN+		Tennessee Tech	L 80–84 ^{OT}	10–7 (2–2)	Skyhawk Arena (1,484); Martin, TN
January 12, 2023; 8:00 pm, ESPN+		at Tennessee State	W 77–66	11–7 (3–2)	Gentry Complex (372); Nashville, TN
January 14, 2023; 7:30 pm, ESPN+		at Southern Indiana	L 66–80	11–8 (3–3)	Screaming Eagles Arena (2,560); Evansville, IN
January 19, 2023; 7:00 pm, ESPN+		at Southeast Missouri State	W 80–60	12–8 (4–3)	Show Me Center (1,115); Cape Girardeau, MO
January 21, 2023; 3:30 pm, ESPN+		Eastern Illinois	W 91–78	13–8 (5–3)	Skyhawk Arena (1,437); Martin, TN
January 26, 2023; 8:00 pm, ESPN+		Lindenwood	W 66–59	14–8 (6–3)	Skyhawk Arena (1,059); Martin, TN
January 28, 2023; 3:30 pm, ESPN+		Southern Indiana	W 86–83 ^{OT}	15–8 (7–3)	Skyhawk Arena (1,927); Martin, TN
February 2, 2023; 6:00 pm, ESPN+		at SIU Edwardsville	L 75–89	15–9 (7–4)	First Community Arena (918); Edwardsville, IL
February 4, 2023; 3:30 pm, ESPN+		at Lindenwood	L 75–80	15–10 (7–5)	Hyland Performance Arena (1,789); St. Charles, MO
February 9, 2023; 7:30 pm, ESPN+		at Eastern Illinois	L 75–77	15–11 (7–6)	Lantz Arena (1,908); Charleston, IL
February 11, 2023; 3:30 pm, ESPN+		Little Rock	W 84–61	16–11 (8–6)	Skyhawk Arena (1,456); Martin, TN
February 16, 2023; 8:00 pm, ESPN+		SIU Edwardsville	W 90–84	17–11 (9–6)	Skyhawk Arena (1,178); Martin, TN
February 18, 2023; 3:00 pm, ESPN+		at Tennessee Tech	W 100–91	18–11 (10–6)	Eblen Center (1,857); Cookeville, TN
February 23, 2023; 8:00 pm, ESPN+		Tennessee State	L 82–88	18–12 (10–7)	Skyhawk Arena (3,418); Martin, TN
February 25, 2023; 2:00 pm, ESPN+		at Morehead State	L 58–72	18–13 (10–8)	Ellis Johnson Arena (2,672); Morehead, KY
Ohio Valley tournament
March 2, 2023; 9:00 pm, ESPN+	(3)	vs. (6) SIU Edwardsville; Quarterfinals	W 81–75	19–13	Ford Center (968); Evansville, IN
March 3, 2023; 9:30 pm, ESPNU	(3)	vs. (2) Tennessee Tech; Semifinals	L 63–78	19–14	Ford Center (1,172); Evansville, IN
*Non-conference game. ^{#}Rankings from AP Poll. (#) Tournament seedings in parentheses. All times are in Central.
