= 2022–23 Little Rock Trojans men's basketball team =

American college basketball season

2022–23 Little Rock Trojans men's basketball
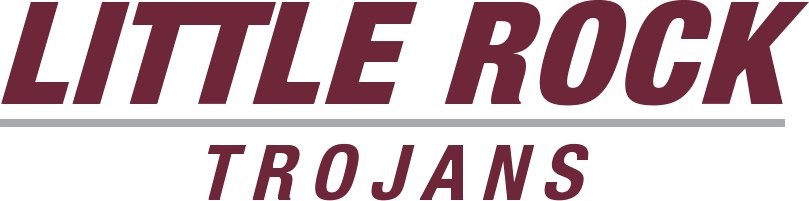
- Conference: Ohio Valley Conference
- Record: 10–21 (6–12 OVC)
- Head coach: Darrell Walker (5th season)
- Assistant coaches: Charles Baker; Preston Laird; Julius Hodge
- Home arena: Jack Stephens Center

2022–23 Ohio Valley Conference men's basketball standings
	Conf.				Overall
Team	W		L	PCT	W		L	PCT
Morehead State	14	–	4	.778	22	–	12	.647
Tennessee Tech	11	–	7	.611	16	–	17	.485
UT Martin	10	–	8	.556	19	–	14	.576
Tennessee State	10	–	8	.556	18	–	14	.563
Southeast Missouri State †	10	–	8	.556	19	–	17	.528
SIU Edwardsville	9	–	9	.500	19	–	14	.576
Southern Indiana*	9	–	9	.500	16	–	17	.485
Lindenwood*	6	–	12	.333	11	–	21	.344
Little Rock	6	–	12	.333	10	–	21	.323
Eastern Illinois	5	–	13	.278	9	–	22	.290
† 2023 OVC tournament winner * ineligible for the 2023 NCAA tournament due to transition period

The 2022–23 Little Rock Trojans men's basketball team represented the University of Arkansas at Little Rock in the 2022–23 NCAA Division I men's basketball season. The Trojans, led by fifth-year head coach Darrell Walker, played their home games at the Jack Stephens Center in Little Rock, Arkansas, as first-year members of the Ohio Valley Conference. They finished the season 10–21, 6–12 in OVC play to finish in ninth place. They failed to qualify for the OVC Tournament.

== Previous season ==
The Trojans finished the 2021–22 season 9–19, 3–11 in Sun Belt play to finish in last place. As the No. 12 seed, they upset No. 5 seed South Alabama in the first round of the Sun Belt tournament, before falling to Troy in the quarterfinals.

The season was the school's last season as a member of the Sun Belt Conference as they moved to the Ohio Valley Conference, effective July 1, 2022.

== Roster ==
2022–23 Little Rock Trojans men's basketball team
Players
Coaches

Pos.	#	Name	Height	Weight	Year	Hometown
F	0	Daniel Egbuniwe	6 ft 7 in (2.01 m)	210 lb (95 kg)	Fr	Memphis, Tennessee
F	1	DeAntoni Gordon	6 ft 8 in (2.03 m)	220 lb (100 kg)	Sr	Mobile, Alabama
G	2	D.J. Smith	6 ft 0 in (1.83 m)	160 lb (73 kg)	So	North Little Rock, Arkansas
G	3	Isaiah Palermo	6 ft 6 in (1.98 m)	200 lb (91 kg)	Sr	Kissimmee, Florida
G	5	CJ White	6 ft 5 in (1.96 m)	220 lb (100 kg)	GS	Little Rock, Arkansas
G	10	Chris Walker	6 ft 6 in (1.98 m)	195 lb (88 kg)	RS Fr	Wellington, Florida
F	11	Ethan Speaker	6 ft 7 in (2.01 m)	215 lb (98 kg)	RS Fr	Boulder City, Nevada
G	12	Jordan Jefferson	6 ft 4 in (1.93 m)	180 lb (82 kg)	So	Marietta, Georgia
G	13	Jordan Shorter	6 ft 4 in (1.93 m)	200 lb (91 kg)	Fr	Miami, Florida
G	15	Myron Gardner	6 ft 6 in (1.98 m)	220 lb (100 kg)	Sr	Detroit, Michigan
G	20	Marcus Golden	6 ft 0 in (1.83 m)	175 lb (79 kg)	Fr	Anna, Texas
F	21	Ante Beljan	6 ft 8 in (2.03 m)	220 lb (100 kg)	Fr	Trogir, Croatia
F	22	Nigel John	6 ft 8 in (2.03 m)	245 lb (111 kg)	So	Allen, Texas
G	24	Shota Abashidze	5 ft 11 in (1.8 m)	150 lb (68 kg)	Fr	Tbilisi, Georgia
G	33	Jovan Stulic	6 ft 6 in (1.98 m)	215 lb (98 kg)	Sr	Prigrevica, Serbia

Head coach

- Darrell Walker (Arkansas)

Assistant coach(es)

- Charles Baker (Eastern Kentucky)
- Preston Laird (Memphis)
- Julius Hodge (NC State)

Legend

- (C) Team captain
- (S) Suspended
- (I) Ineligible
- (W) Walk-on
- Injured
- Current redshirt

Roster
Last update: December 29, 2022

== Schedule and results ==
Due to unseasonably cold weather, a water coil at the Trojans' normal home of Jack Stephens Center froze and burst on December 28, flooding the court. The team's next home game on December 29 was moved to Simmons Bank Arena in North Little Rock. The Stephens Center reopened for the January 4 game against Lindenwood.

Date time, TV	Rank^{#}	Opponent^{#}	Result	Record	High points	High rebounds	High assists	Site (attendance) city, state
Non-conference regular season
November 7, 2022*; 7:00 pm, ESPN3		at Southern Illinois	L 63–94	0–1	21 – Smith	6 – Gardner	2 – 3 Tied	Banterra Center (5,199); Carbondale, IL
November 10, 2022*; 7:30 pm, ESPN+		Arkansas Baptist	W 71–60	1–1	16 – John	13 – Gardner	6 – Smith	Jack Stephens Center (2,522); Little Rock, AR
November 14, 2022*; 7:00 pm, ESPN+		at Central Arkansas; Governor's I-40 Showdown	L 71–82	1–2	14 – John	14 – Gardner	6 – Gardner	Farris Center (1,945); Conway, AR
November 17, 2022*; 6:00 pm, ESPN+		at East Tennessee State	L 76–84	1–3	15 – Jefferson	8 – Gardner	7 – Gardner	Freedom Hall Civic Center (2,814); Johnson City, TN
November 20, 2022*; 6:30 pm, ESPN+		Jackson State; Indiana Hoosier Classic	W 94–91	2–3	23 – Gardner	9 – Gardner	5 – Smith	Jack Stephens Center (2,685); Little Rock, AR
November 23, 2022*; 5:30 pm, BTN		at No. 11 Indiana; Indiana Hoosier Classic	L 68–87	2–4	20 – Smith	9 – Gardner	6 – Gardner	Simon Skjodt Assembly Hall (11,829); Bloomington, IN
November 26, 2022*; 12:00 pm, ESPN3		at Miami (OH); Indiana Hoosier Classic	L 67–80	2–5	18 – Smith	8 – Walker	5 – Gardner	Millett Hall (804); Oxford, OH
November 30, 2022*; 9:00 pm, WCC Network		at San Francisco	L 68–90	2–6	16 – Smith	12 – Gardner	3 – Smith	War Memorial Gymnasium; San Francisco, CA
December 6, 2022*; 7:00 pm, ESPN+		at Memphis	L 71–87	2–7	18 – Walker	10 – Gardner	4 – 2 Tied	FedExForum (9,259); Memphis, TN
December 12, 2022*; 6:30 pm, ESPN+		Philander Smith	W 83–54	3–7	17 – Jefferson	11 – 2 Tied	4 – Gardner	Jack Stephens Center (2,486); Little Rock, AR
December 17, 2022*; 1:00 pm, ESPN+		at Jacksonville State	L 62–72	3–8	20 – Gardner	5 – Speaker	3 – 2 Tied	Pete Mathews Coliseum (1,043); Jacksonville, AL
December 20, 2022*; 6:30 pm, ESPN+		Central Arkansas; Governor's I-40 Showdown	W 75–66	4–8	17 – Gardner	13 – Gardner	6 – Gardner	Jack Stephens Center (2,766); Little Rock, AR
December 22, 2022*; 2:00 pm, ESPN+		at Arkansas State	L 75–77	4–9	30 – Jefferson	10 – Gardner	3 – Gardner	First National Bank Arena (1,378); Jonesboro, AR
OVC regular season
December 29, 2022; 7:30 pm		UT Martin	W 88–74	5–9 (1–0)	23 – Gardner	12 – Gordon	5 – Gardner	Simmons Bank Arena (2,709); North Little Rock, AR
December 31, 2022; 3:30 pm, ESPN+		at Tennessee State	L 69–94	5–10 (1–1)	17 – Jefferson	7 – Walker	3 – Walker	Gentry Complex (550); Nashville, TN
January 4, 2023; 7:30 pm, ESPN+		Lindenwood	L 62–67	5–11 (1–2)	16 – Gardner	15 – Gardner	5 – White	Jack Stephens Center (1,983); Little Rock, AR
January 7, 2023; 3:30 pm, ESPN+		Southeast Missouri State	L 68–74	5–12 (1–3)	14 – Smith	12 – Gardner	5 – Smith	Jack Stephens Center (2,135); Little Rock, AR
January 12, 2023; 8:00 pm, ESPNU		at Southern Indiana	L 67–74	5–13 (1–4)	20 – Gordon	8 – White	3 – Gardner	Screaming Eagles Arena (2,296); Evansville, IN
January 14, 2023; 3:30 pm, ESPN+		at Eastern Illinois	L 63–70	5–14 (1–5)	13 – Jefferson	9 – Gardner	7 – Gardner	Lantz Arena (1,363); Charleston, IL
January 19, 2023; 7:30 pm, ESPN+		Tennessee Tech	L 75–77	5–15 (1–6)	16 – Gordon	13 – White	8 – White	Jack Stephens Center (2,509); Little Rock, AR
January 21, 2023; 3:30 pm, ESPN+		Tennessee State	W 89–77	6–15 (2–6)	21 – White	7 – White	5 – White	Jack Stephens Center (3,446); Little Rock, AR
January 26, 2023; 6:00 pm, ESPN+		at Morehead State	L 72–76	6–16 (2–7)	18 – Gordon	10 – Gardner	2 – Tied	Ellis Johnson Arena (1,557); Morehead, KY
January 28, 2023; 3:00 pm, ESPN+		at Tennessee Tech	W 91–89	7–16 (3–7)	25 – Gordon	9 – Gordon	11 – White	Eblen Center (1,659); Cookeville, TN
February 2, 2023; 7:00 pm, ESPN+		at Southeast Missouri State	L 98–99	7–17 (3–8)	22 – White	10 – Gardner	6 – White	Show Me Center (1,290); Cape Girardeau, MO
February 4, 2023; 3:30 pm, ESPN+		SIU Edwardsville	L 81–84	7–18 (3–9)	21 – Gordon	10 – Gardner	6 – Gardner	Jack Stephens Center (2,752); Little Rock, AR
February 9, 2023; 6:30 pm, ESPN+		Morehead State	W 72–68	8–18 (4–9)	15 – White	14 – Gardner	5 – Gardner	Jack Stephens Center (2,601); Little Rock, AR
February 11, 2023; 3:30 pm, ESPN+		at UT Martin	L 61–84	8–19 (4–10)	19 – Palermo	8 – White	6 – Tied	Skyhawk Arena (1,456); Union City, TN
February 16, 2023; 7:30 pm, ESPN+		Southern Indiana	L 81–82	8–20 (4–11)	20 – Gordon	12 – Gardner	9 – Gardner	Jack Stephens Center (2,939); Little Rock, AR
February 18, 2023; 3:30 pm, ESPN+		Eastern Illinois	W 81–77	9–20 (5–11)	20 – Smith	12 – Gordon	9 – White	Jack Stephens Center (3,001); Little Rock, AR
February 23, 2023; 7:30 pm, ESPN+		at SIU Edwardsville	W 79–74	10–20 (6–11)	19 – White	11 – Gardner	6 – Smith	First Community Arena (846); Edwardsville, IL
February 25, 2023; 3:30 pm, ESPN+		at Lindenwood	L 96–97 ^{OT}	10–21 (6–12)	35 – Gordon	9 – Gordon	10 – White	Hyland Performance Arena (1,811); St. Charles, MO
*Non-conference game. ^{#}Rankings from AP Poll. (#) Tournament seedings in parentheses. All times are in Central.
