= 2022–23 Lindenwood Lions men's basketball team =

American college basketball season

2022–23 Lindenwood Lions men's basketball
- Conference: Ohio Valley Conference
- Record: 11–21 (6–21 OVC)
- Head coach: Kyle Gerdeman (4th season)
- Assistant coaches: Anthony Beane; Kyle Campbell; Tommy Abdenour
- Home arena: Hyland Performance Arena

2022–23 Ohio Valley Conference men's basketball standings
	Conf.				Overall
Team	W		L	PCT	W		L	PCT
Morehead State	14	–	4	.778	22	–	12	.647
Tennessee Tech	11	–	7	.611	16	–	17	.485
UT Martin	10	–	8	.556	19	–	14	.576
Tennessee State	10	–	8	.556	18	–	14	.563
Southeast Missouri State †	10	–	8	.556	19	–	17	.528
SIU Edwardsville	9	–	9	.500	19	–	14	.576
Southern Indiana*	9	–	9	.500	16	–	17	.485
Lindenwood*	6	–	12	.333	11	–	21	.344
Little Rock	6	–	12	.333	10	–	21	.323
Eastern Illinois	5	–	13	.278	9	–	22	.290
† 2023 OVC tournament winner * ineligible for the 2023 NCAA tournament due to transition period

The 2022–23 Lindenwood Lions men's basketball team represented Lindenwood University in the 2022–23 NCAA Division I men's basketball season. The Lions, led by fourth-year head coach Kyle Gerdeman, played their home games at Hyland Performance Arena in St. Charles, Missouri as members of the Ohio Valley Conference (OVC). They finished the season 11–21, 6–12 in OVC play, to finish in a tie for eighth place. As the No. 8 seed in the OVC tournament, they lost to Southeast Missouri State in the first round.

The season marked Lindenwood's first year of a four-year transition period from Division II to Division I. As a result, the Lions were not eligible for NCAA postseason play until the 2026–27 season.

== Previous season ==
The Lions finished the 2021–22 season 12–17, 8–12 in Great Lakes Valley Conference (GLVC) play, to finish tied for third place in the Central Division. They were defeated by William Jewell in the first round of the GLVC tournament.

== Roster ==
2022–23 Lindenwood Lions men's basketball team
Players
Coaches

Pos.	#	Name	Height	Weight	Year	Hometown
F	0	David Ware	6 ft 5 in (1.96 m)	210 lb (95 kg)	Jr	Milford, VA
G	1	Donavan Moore	6 ft 3 in (1.91 m)	185 lb (84 kg)	Jr	Hillsboro, IL
G	2	Brandon Trimble	6 ft 2 in (1.88 m)	182 lb (83 kg)	Sr	St. Joseph, IL
G	3	Tommie Williams	6 ft 4 in (1.93 m)	185 lb (84 kg)	Fr	Belleville, IL
G	4	Jacob Tracey	6 ft 4 in (1.93 m)	195 lb (88 kg)	Jr	Fort Myers, FL
F	5	Cam Burrell	6 ft 7 in (2.01 m)	180 lb (82 kg)	Sr	Chicago, IL
F	10	Karrington Davis	6 ft 7 in (2.01 m)	215 lb (98 kg)	Jr	St. Louis, MO
G	11	Kevin Jr. Caldwell	5 ft 11 in (1.8 m)	170 lb (77 kg)	Sr	Alton, IL
G	12	Sharrod Taylor	6 ft 3 in (1.91 m)	175 lb (79 kg)	So	Youngstown, OH
G	13	Raynard Horry	5 ft 11 in (1.8 m)	170 lb (77 kg)	Fr	O'Fallon, MO
G	20	Brayden Wampler-Foust	6 ft 3 in (1.91 m)	190 lb (86 kg)	Fr	St. Charles, MO
G	22	Braden Bryant	6 ft 1 in (1.85 m)	180 lb (82 kg)	Fr	Mascoutah, IL
F	24	Keenon Cole	6 ft 7 in (2.01 m)	215 lb (98 kg)	Jr	Streamwood, IL
G	25	Darius Beane	6 ft 3 in (1.91 m)	175 lb (79 kg)	Sr	Carbondale, IL
G	30	Chris Childs	6 ft 2 in (1.88 m)	180 lb (82 kg)	Sr	The Bronx, NY
F	40	Devion Harris	6 ft 7 in (2.01 m)	240 lb (109 kg)	Fr	St. Louis, MO
F	42	Remy Lemovou	6 ft 9 in (2.06 m)	220 lb (100 kg)	Jr	Yaoundé, Cameroon

Head coach

- Kyle Gerdeman (Southeast Missouri State)

Assistant coach(es)

- Anthony Beane (Kansas State)
- Kyle Campbell (Hastings)
- Tommy Abdenour (Utah)

Legend

- (C) Team captain
- (S) Suspended
- (I) Ineligible
- (W) Walk-on
- Injured
- Current redshirt

Roster
Last update: November 13, 2022

== Schedule and results ==
Date time, TV	Rank^{#}	Opponent^{#}	Result	Record	Site (attendance) city, state
Non-conference regular season
November 7, 2022*; 6:00 p.m., ESPN+		at No. 24 Dayton	L 46–73	0–1	UD Arena (13,407); Dayton, OH
November 10, 2022*; 7:00 p.m., ESPN+		Hannibal–LaGrange	W 85–58	1–1	Hyland Performance Arena (582); St. Charles, MO
November 13, 2022*; 5:00 p.m., SECN+/ESPN+		at Missouri	L 53–82	1–2	Mizzou Arena (7,914); Columbia, MO
November 18, 2022*; 2:00 p.m.		vs. Lamar; McNeese Tournament	L 71–73	1–3	The Legacy Center (211); Lake Charles, LA
November 19, 2022*; 1:00 p.m.		at McNeese State; McNeese Tournament	W 78–60	2–3	The Legacy Center (1,520); Lake Charles, LA
November 20, 2022*; 11:00 am		vs. Western Carolina; McNeese Tournament	L 88–90 ^{OT}	2–4	The Legacy Center (169); Lake Charles, LA
November 23, 2022*; 7:00 p.m., ESPN+		Idaho State	W 77–76 ^{OT}	3–4	Hyland Performance Arena (731); St. Charles, MO
November 25, 2022*; 8:00 p.m., BTN+		at No. 16 Illinois	L 59–92	3–5	State Farm Center (12,552); Champaign, IL
November 30, 2022*; 7:00 p.m., ESPN+		East–West	W 103–56	4–5	Hyland Performance Arena (586); St. Charles, MO
December 3, 2022*; 7:00 p.m.		at Kansas City	L 47–61	4–6	Swinney Recreation Center (723); Kansas City, MO
December 17, 2022*; 1:00 p.m., ESPN+		Knox College	W 77–42	5–6	Hyland Performance Arena (822); St. Charles, MO
December 20, 2022*; 8:00 p.m., BYUtv		at BYU	L 61–90	5–7	Marriott Center (12,180); Provo, UT
December 22, 2022*; 2:00 p.m., ESPN+		at Utah Tech	L 64–95	5–8	Burns Arena (442); St. George, UT
OVC regular season
December 29, 2022; 7:30 p.m., ESPN+		at Eastern Illinois	L 54–55	5–9 (0–1)	Lantz Arena (854); Charleston, IL
December 31, 2022; 3:30 p.m., ESPN+		Tennessee Tech	W 82–64	6–9 (1–1)	Hyland Performance Arena; St. Charles, MO
January 4, 2023; 7:30 p.m., ESPN+		at Little Rock	W 67–62	7–9 (2–1)	Jack Stephens Center (1,983); Little Rock, AR
January 7, 2023; 3:30 p.m., ESPN+		Tennessee State	L 57–60	7–10 (2–2)	Hyland Performance Arena (1,517); St. Charles, MO
January 12, 2023; 7:00 p.m., ESPN+		at Southeast Missouri State	L 71–94	7–11 (2–3)	Show Me Center (875); Cape Girardeau, MO
January 14, 2023; 5:30 p.m.		at SIU Edwardsville	L 58–68	7–12 (2–4)	First Community Arena (1,839); Edwardsville, IL
January 19, 2023; 8:00 p.m., ESPN+		Southern Indiana	L 65–81	7–13 (2–5)	Hyland Performance Arena (2,073); St. Charles, MO
January 21, 2023; 3:30 p.m., ESPN+		Morehead State	L 63–72	7–14 (2–6)	Hyland Performance Arena (1,211); St. Charles, MO
January 26, 2023; 8:00 p.m., ESPN+		at UT Martin	L 59–66	7–15 (2–7)	Skyhawk Arena (1,059); Union City, TN
January 28, 2023; 3:30 p.m., ESPN+		at Tennessee State	L 66–83	7–16 (2–8)	Gentry Complex (1,246); Nashville, TN
February 2, 2023; 8:00 p.m., ESPN+		Eastern Illinois	W 80–67	8–16 (3–8)	Hyland Performance Arena (1,574); St. Charles, MO
February 4, 2023; 3:30 p.m., ESPN+		UT Martin	W 80–75	9–16 (4–8)	Hyland Performance Arena (1,789); St. Charles, MO
February 9, 2023; 8:00 p.m., ESPN+		SIU Edwardsville	L 58–63	9–17 (4–9)	Hyland Performance Arena (2,132); St. Charles, MO
February 11, 2023; 7:30 p.m., ESPN+		at Southern Indiana	L 64–74	9–18 (4–10)	Screaming Eagles Arena (2,659); Evansville, IN
February 16, 2023; 7:30 p.m., ESPN+		at Tennessee Tech	L 68–77	9–19 (4–11)	Eblen Center (1,064); Cookeville, TN
February 18, 2023; 2:00 p.m., ESPN+		at Morehead State	L 58–71	9–20 (4–12)	Ellis Johnson Arena (2,788); Morehead, KY
February 23, 2023; 8:00 p.m., ESPN+		Southeast Missouri State	W 105–102 ^{2OT}	10–20 (5–12)	Hyland Performance Arena (2,119); St. Charles, MO
February 25, 2023; 3:30 p.m., ESPN+		Little Rock	W 97–96 ^{OT}	11–20 (6–12)	Hyland Performance Arena (1,811); St. Charles, MO
OVC tournament
March 3, 2023; 8:00 p.m., ESPN+	(8)	vs. (5) Southeast Missouri State; First round	L 65–84	11–21	Ford Center; Evansville, IN
*Non-conference game. ^{#}Rankings from AP poll. (#) Tournament seedings in parentheses. All times are in Central.
