= Brad Korn =

American basketball player and coach (born 1981)

Current position
- Title: Head coach
- Team: Southeast Missouri State
- Conference: OVC
- Record: 94–98 (.490)

Biographical details
- Born: August 22, 1981 (age 45); Oswego, Illinois, U.S.

Playing career
- 1999–2004: Southern Illinois

Coaching career (HC unless noted)
- 2004–2012: Southern Illinois (assistant)
- 2012–2013: Kansas State (assistant)
- 2013–2016: Missouri State (assistant)
- 2016–2020: Kansas State (assistant)
- 2020–present: Southeast Missouri State

Head coaching record
- Overall: 94–98 (.490)
- Tournaments: 0–1 (NCAA Tournament)

Accomplishments and honors

Championships
- OVC regular season (2025); OVC tournament (2023)

Awards
- OVC Coach of the Year (2025)

Brad Korn (born August 22, 1981) is an American basketball coach who is the current head coach of the Southeast Missouri State Redhawks men's basketball team.

== Playing career ==
Korn played four years at Southern Illinois, three under Bruce Weber and one under Matt Painter and was a member of three-straight Salukis' NCAA Tournament appearances, including the Sweet 16 in 2002.

== Coaching career ==
Korn would transition from playing to the Salukis' coaching staff under Chris Lowery, where he was part of another three-straight NCAA Tournament appearances and a Sweet 16 appearance in 2007. Following Lowery's firing from Southern Illinois, Korn joined Weber's staff at Kansas State for one season as the director of basketball operations before becoming an assistant coach at Missouri State from 2013 to 2016. He'd return to Kansas State in 2016 as an assistant coach, in which the Wildcats had three-straight NCAA Tournament appearances, capped by an Elite Eight run in 2018.

On March 24, 2020, Korn was introduced as the seventh head coach in the Division I era at Southeast Missouri State, replacing Rick Ray.

== Head coaching record ==
Record table
Season	Team	Overall	Conference	Standing	Postseason
Southeast Missouri State Redhawks (Ohio Valley Conference) (2020–present)
2020–21	Southeast Missouri State	11–16	9–11	7th	
2021–22	Southeast Missouri State	14–18	8–9	4th	
2022–23	Southeast Missouri State	19–17	10–8	T–3rd	NCAA Division I First Four
2023–24	Southeast Missouri State	9–22	4–14	10th	
2024–25	Southeast Missouri State	21–12	15–5	1st	
2025–26	Southeast Missouri State	20–13	14–6	3rd	
2026–27	Southeast Missouri State	0–0	0–0		
Southeast Missouri State:		94–98 (.490)	60–53 (.531)		
Total:		94–98 (.490)			
National champion Postseason invitational champion Conference regular season champion Conference regular season and conference tournament champion Division regular season champion Division regular season and conference tournament champion Conference tournament champion
