= 2022–23 Tennessee Tech Golden Eagles men's basketball team =

American college basketball season

2022–23 Tennessee Tech Golden Eagles men's basketball
- Conference: Ohio Valley Conference
- Record: 16–17 (11–7 OVC)
- Head coach: John Pelphrey (4th season)
- Assistant coaches: Alex Fain; Blake Gray; Andrew Steele
- Home arena: Eblen Center

2022–23 Ohio Valley Conference men's basketball standings
	Conf.				Overall
Team	W		L	PCT	W		L	PCT
Morehead State	14	–	4	.778	22	–	12	.647
Tennessee Tech	11	–	7	.611	16	–	17	.485
UT Martin	10	–	8	.556	19	–	14	.576
Tennessee State	10	–	8	.556	18	–	14	.563
Southeast Missouri State †	10	–	8	.556	19	–	17	.528
SIU Edwardsville	9	–	9	.500	19	–	14	.576
Southern Indiana*	9	–	9	.500	16	–	17	.485
Lindenwood*	6	–	12	.333	11	–	21	.344
Little Rock	6	–	12	.333	10	–	21	.323
Eastern Illinois	5	–	13	.278	9	–	22	.290
† 2023 OVC tournament winner * ineligible for the 2023 NCAA tournament due to transition period

The 2022–23 Tennessee Tech Golden Eagles men's basketball team represented Tennessee Technological University in the 2022–23 NCAA Division I men's basketball season. The Golden Eagles, led by fourth-year head coach John Pelphrey, played their home games at the Eblen Center in Cookeville, Tennessee as members of the Ohio Valley Conference. They finished the season 16–17, 11–7 in OVC play to finish in second place. They defeated UT Martin to advance to the championship of the OVC tournament where they lost to Southeast Missouri State.

== Previous season ==
The Golden Eagles finished the 2021–22 season 11–21, 7–10 in OVC play to finish in seventh place. As the No. 7 seed, they defeated Austin Peay in the first round of the OVC tournament, before falling to Morehead State in the quarterfinals.

== Roster ==
2022–23 Tennessee Tech Golden Eagles men's basketball team
Players
Coaches

Pos.	#	Name	Height	Weight	Year	Hometown
G	0	Ty Perry	6 ft 2 in (1.88 m)	175 lb (79 kg)	GS	Apopka, Florida
G	1	Diante Wood	6 ft 4 in (1.93 m)	210 lb (95 kg)	Jr	Anniston, Alabama
F	2	Jaylen Sebree	6 ft 7 in (2.01 m)	200 lb (91 kg)	GS	Hopkinsville, Kentucky
F	3	Daniel Ramsey	6 ft 9 in (2.06 m)	235 lb (107 kg)	Jr	Cordele, Georgia
C	4	Nolan Causwell	6 ft 10 in (2.08 m)	235 lb (107 kg)	Jr	Duluth, Georgia
G	5	Brett Thompson	6 ft 1 in (1.85 m)	180 lb (82 kg)	Jr	Oakland, California
G	10	Grant Slatten	6 ft 5 in (1.96 m)	195 lb (88 kg)	So	Sparta, Tennessee
G	11	Grant Strong	6 ft 6 in (1.98 m)	185 lb (84 kg)	Fr	Celina, Tennessee
G	12	Erik Oliver	6 ft 1 in (1.85 m)	195 lb (88 kg)	Jr	Cheyenne, Wyoming
G	13	Jayvis Harvey	6 ft 5 in (1.96 m)	210 lb (95 kg)	Jr	Durham, North Carolina
F	15	Jalen Stayton	6 ft 8 in (2.03 m)	205 lb (93 kg)	So	Murfreesboro, Tennessee
F	20	Isaiah Nelson-Ododa	6 ft 9 in (2.06 m)	180 lb (82 kg)	RS Fr	Winder, Georgia
G	21	Bailey Gilliam	6 ft 1 in (1.85 m)	175 lb (79 kg)	So	Cookeville, Tennessee
G	24	Marcus Lee Jr.	6 ft 4 in (1.93 m)	210 lb (95 kg)	Sr	Memphis, Tennessee
G	33	Bogdan Zimonjic	6 ft 5 in (1.96 m)	190 lb (86 kg)	So	Belgrade, Serbia
F	35	Jerome Beya	6 ft 9 in (2.06 m)	225 lb (102 kg)	Fr	Kinshasa, Democratic Republic of the Congo
G	52	Walter Peggs Jr.	6 ft 4 in (1.93 m)	200 lb (91 kg)	So	Jackson, Tennessee

Head coach

- John Pelphrey (Kentucky)

Assistant coach(es)

- Alex Fain (Alabama)
- Blake Gray (Alabama)
- Andrew Steele (Alabama)

Legend

- (C) Team captain
- (S) Suspended
- (I) Ineligible
- (W) Walk-on
- Injured
- Current redshirt

Roster
Last update: November 1, 2022

== Schedule and results ==
Date time, TV	Rank^{#}	Opponent^{#}	Result	Record	Site (attendance) city, state
Exhibition
October 27, 2022*; 7:30 pm		Cumberland	W 80–69	–	Eblen Center; Cookeville, TN
Non-conference regular season
November 7, 2022*; 6:00 pm, SECN+/ESPN+		at No. 11 Tennessee	L 43–75	0–1	Thompson–Boling Arena (17,957); Knoxville, TN
November 10, 2022*; 6:00 pm, ESPN+		Tennessee Wesleyan	W 82–48	1–1	Eblen Center (966); Cookeville, TN
November 14, 2022*; 6:00 pm, ESPN+		at Marshall; Herd Run Hoops Jam	L 65–91	1–2	Cam Henderson Center (4,240); Huntington, WV
November 17, 2022*; 7:30 pm, ESPN+		Coppin State; Herd Run Hoops Jam	L 85–90 ^{OT}	1–3	Eblen Center (1,166); Cookeville, TN
November 20, 2022*; 3:00 pm, ESPN+		East Tennessee State	W 69–62	2–3	Eblen Center (787); Cookeville, TN
November 22, 2022*; 6:00 pm, ESPN+		Truett McConnell	W 84–48	3–3	Eblen Center (633); Cookeville, TN
November 27, 2022*; 1:00 pm, ESPN+		at Northern Kentucky	L 77–85 ^{2OT}	3–4	Truist Arena (2,267); Highland Heights, KY
November 30, 2022*; 6:00 pm, ESPN+		Chattanooga	L 74–81	3–5	Eblen Center (831); Cookeville, TN
December 3, 2022*; 1:00 pm, FS1		at Butler	L 66–80	3–6	Hinkle Fieldhouse (7,723); Indianapolis, IN
December 10, 2022*; 4:30 pm, ESPN+		at Troy	L 64–87	3–7	Trojan Arena (2,987); Troy, AL
December 14, 2022*; 7:00 pm, ESPN+		at Lipscomb	L 63–64	3–8	Allen Arena (661); Nashville, TN
December 17, 2022*; 3:00 pm, ESPN+		Western Carolina	L 65–75	3–9	Eblen Center (557); Cookeville, TN
December 20, 2022*; 6:00 pm, ESPN+		Kentucky Christian	W 104–72	4–9	Eblen Center (579); Cookeville, TN
OVC regular season
December 29, 2022; 7:30 pm, ESPN+		at SIU Edwardsville	L 51–64	4–10 (0–1)	First Community Arena (956); Edwardsville, IL
December 31, 2022; 3:30 pm, ESPN+		at Lindenwood	L 64–82	4–11 (0–2)	Hyland Performance Arena; St. Charles, MO
January 5, 2023; 7:30 pm, ESPN+		Eastern Illinois	W 70–49	5–11 (1–2)	Eblen Center (1,323); Cookeville, TN
January 7, 2023; 3:30 pm, ESPN+		at UT Martin	W 84–80 ^{OT}	6–11 (2–2)	Skyhawk Arena (1,484); Union City, TN
January 12, 2023; 7:30 pm, ESPN+		Morehead State	W 79–62	7–11 (3–2)	Eblen Center (1,085); Cookeville, TN
January 14, 2023; 3:00 pm, ESPN+		Tennessee State	W 71–63	8–11 (4–2)	Eblen Center (1,573); Cookeville, TN
January 19, 2023; 7:30 pm, ESPN+		at Little Rock	W 77–75	9–11 (5–2)	Jack Stephens Center (2,509); Little Rock, AR
January 21, 2023; 4:00 pm, ESPN+		at Southeast Missouri State	L 77–84 ^{2OT}	9–12 (5–3)	Show Me Center (2,632); Cape Girardeau, MO
January 26, 2023; 7:30 pm, ESPN+		SIU Edwardsville	W 80–68	10–12 (6–3)	Eblen Center (1,913); Cookeville, TN
January 28, 2023; 3:00 pm, ESPN+		Little Rock	L 89–91	10–13 (6–4)	Eblen Center (1,659); Cookeville, TN
February 2, 2023; 6:00 pm, ESPN+		at Morehead State	L 45–64	10–14 (6–5)	Ellis Johnson Arena (2,055); Morehead, KY
February 4, 2023; 3:00 pm, ESPN+		Southeast Missouri State	W 82–80	11–14 (7–5)	Eblen Center (1,476); Cookeville, TN
February 9, 2023; 7:30 pm, ESPN+		Southern Indiana	W 84–69	12–14 (8–5)	Eblen Center (1,977); Cookeville, TN
February 11, 2023; 3:30 pm, ESPN+		at Tennessee State	L 53–67	12–15 (8–6)	Gentry Complex (4,347); Nashville, TN
February 16, 2023; 7:30 pm, ESPN+		Lindenwood	W 77–68	13–15 (9–6)	Eblen Center (1,064); Cookeville, TN
February 18, 2023; 3:00 pm, ESPN+		UT Martin	L 91–100	13–16 (9–7)	Eblen Center (1,857); Cookeville, TN
February 23, 2023; 7:30 pm, ESPN+		at Southern Indiana	W 82–79	14–16 (10–7)	Screaming Eagles Arena (2,195); Evansville, IN
February 25, 2023; 3:30 pm, ESPN+		at Eastern Illinois	W 75–66	15–16 (11–7)	Lantz Arena (1,923); Charleston, IL
Ohio Valley tournament
March 3, 2023; 9:30 pm, ESPNU	(2)	vs. (3) UT Martin; Semifinals	W 78–63	16–16	Ford Center (1,172); Evansville, IN
March 4, 2023; 7:00 pm, ESPN2	(2)	vs. (5) Southeast Missouri State; Championship	L 82–89 ^{OT}	16–17	Ford Center; Evansville, IN
*Non-conference game. ^{#}Rankings from AP Poll. (#) Tournament seedings in parentheses. All times are in Central.
