= Keith Richard =

American basketball coach (born 1960)

Biographical details
- Born: January 10, 1960 (age 66); Baton Rouge, Louisiana, U.S.

Playing career
- 1978–1982: Northeast Louisiana

Coaching career (HC unless noted)
- 1984–1986: Northeast Louisiana (G.A.)
- 1986–1989: Marshall (asst.)
- 1989–1994: Northeast Louisiana (asst.)
- 1995–1998: Louisiana Tech (asst.)
- 1998–2007: Louisiana Tech
- 2008–2010: LSU (asst.)
- 2010–2025: Louisiana–Monroe

Administrative career (AD unless noted)
- 2013: Louisiana–Monroe (interim AD)

Head coaching record
- Overall: 320–413 (.437)
- Tournaments: 2–2 (NIT); 3–2 (CBI); 1–3 (CIT)

Accomplishments and honors

Championships
- Sun Belt regular season (1999)

Awards
- 2× Sun Belt Coach of the Year (1999, 2015)

Keith Gerard Richard (born January 10, 1960) is a former American college basketball coach. He coached at the University of Louisiana at Monroe and Louisiana Tech University.

Born in Baton Rouge, Louisiana, Richard earned a B.A. in business (1982) and M.A. in counseling (1986) from Northeast Louisiana University, now the University of Louisiana at Monroe. As a senior on the Northeast Louisiana basketball team, Richard started 29 of 30 games and averaged 4.5 points per game. Richard was on the Northeast Louisiana teams that won the Trans American Athletic Conference regular season titles in 1979, 1980, and 1982 and conference tournament in 1982. Richard is the active leader and 2nd all-time in Sun Belt Conference wins with 124.

== Coaching career ==
=== Louisiana Tech ===
Ricard was head coach of Louisiana Tech from 1998–2007, after being assistant coach there for the three previous seasons. He had a 150–117 record during his nine seasons there.

=== Louisiana–Monroe ===
In 2010, Richard was named head coach of Louisiana–Monroe. On December 20, 2024, Richard announced that he would retire from coaching at the end of the 2024–25 basketball season. His record at ULM was 170–296.

== Head coaching record ==
Record table
Season	Team	Overall	Conference	Standing	Postseason
Louisiana Tech Bulldogs (Sun Belt Conference) (1998–2001)
1998–99	Louisiana Tech	19–9	10–4	1st	
1999–00	Louisiana Tech	21–8	13–5	3rd	
2000–01	Louisiana Tech	17–12	10–6	T–2nd (East)	
Louisiana Tech Bulldogs (Western Athletic Conference) (2001–2007)
2001–02	Louisiana Tech	22–10	14–4	3rd	NIT First Round
2002–03	Louisiana Tech	12–15	9–9	T–6th	
2003–04	Louisiana Tech	15–15	8–10	7th	
2004–05	Louisiana Tech	14–15	9–9	T–4th	
2005–06	Louisiana Tech	20–13	11–5	T–2nd	NIT First Round
2006–07	Louisiana Tech	10–20	7–9	7th	
Louisiana Tech:		150–117 (.562)	91–61 (.599)		
Louisiana–Monroe Warhawks (Sun Belt Conference) (2010–2025)
2010–11	Louisiana–Monroe	7–24	2–14	6th (West)	
2011–12	Louisiana–Monroe	3–26	2–14	6th (West)	
2012–13	Louisiana–Monroe	4–23	3–17	5th (West)	
2013–14	Louisiana–Monroe	10–17	7–11	7th	
2014–15	Louisiana–Monroe	24–14	14–6	T–2nd	CBI Runner-up
2015–16	Louisiana–Monroe	20–14	15–5	2nd	CIT First Round
2016–17	Louisiana–Monroe	9–24	2–16	12th	
2017–18	Louisiana–Monroe	16–16	9–9	T–5th	CIT First Round
2018–19	Louisiana–Monroe	19–16	9–9	T–6th	CIT Second Round
2019–20	Louisiana–Monroe	9–20	5–15	T–11th	
2020–21	Louisiana–Monroe	7–19	5–13	6th (West)	
2021–22	Louisiana–Monroe	13–18	5–13	11th	
2022–23	Louisiana–Monroe	11–21	7–11	10th	
2023–24	Louisiana–Monroe	11–19	6–12	12th	
2024–25	Louisiana–Monroe	7–25	3–15	T–13th	
Louisiana–Monroe:		170–296 (.365)	94–180 (.343)		
Total:		320–413 (.437)			
National champion Postseason invitational champion Conference regular season champion Conference regular season and conference tournament champion Division regular season champion Division regular season and conference tournament champion Conference tournament champion
