= 2021–22 South Alabama Jaguars men's basketball team =

American college basketball season

2021–22 South Alabama Jaguars men's basketball

Las Vegas Classic champions

The Basketball Classic, Semifinals
- Conference: Sun Belt Conference
- Record: 21–12 (9–7 Sun Belt)
- Head coach: Richie Riley (4th season)
- Associate head coach: Adam Howard
- Assistant coaches: Tyler Parker; Rodney Crawford
- Home arena: Mitchell Center

2021–22 Sun Belt Conference men's basketball standings
| | Conf. | | | | Overall |
| Team | W | | L | PCT | W | | L | PCT |
|---|---|---|---|---|---|---|---|---|
| Texas State | 12 | – | 3 | .800 | 21 | – | 8 | .724 |
| Appalachian State | 12 | – | 6 | .667 | 19 | – | 15 | .559 |
| Georgia State † | 9 | – | 5 | .643 | 18 | – | 11 | .621 |
| Troy | 10 | – | 6 | .625 | 20 | – | 12 | .625 |
| South Alabama | 9 | – | 7 | .563 | 21 | – | 12 | .636 |
| Arkansas State | 8 | – | 7 | .533 | 18 | – | 11 | .621 |
| Coastal Carolina | 8 | – | 8 | .500 | 19 | – | 14 | .576 |
| Louisiana | 8 | – | 9 | .471 | 16 | – | 15 | .516 |
| UT Arlington | 7 | – | 10 | .412 | 11 | – | 18 | .379 |
| Georgia Southern | 5 | – | 11 | .313 | 13 | – | 16 | .448 |
| Louisiana–Monroe | 5 | – | 13 | .278 | 13 | – | 18 | .419 |
| Little Rock | 3 | – | 11 | .214 | 9 | – | 19 | .321 |
† 2022 Sun Belt Tournament winner

The 2021–22 South Alabama Jaguars men's basketball team represented the University of South Alabama in the 2021–22 NCAA Division I men's basketball season. The Jaguars, led by fourth-year head coach Richie Riley, play their home games at the Mitchell Center in Mobile, Alabama as members in the Sun Belt Conference.

The Jaguars are set to play in the inaugural 2022 The Basketball Classic postseason tournament.

== Previous season ==
In a season limited due to the COVID-19 pandemic, the Jaguars finished the 2020–21 season 17–11, 10–7 in Sun Belt play to finish in third place in the East Division. In the Sun Belt tournament, they defeated Louisiana–Monroe in the first round, before losing to Louisiana in the quarterfinals.

== Roster ==
2021–22 South Alabama Jaguars men's basketball team
Players
Coaches

| Pos. | # | Name | Height | Weight | Year | Previous school | Hometown |
|---|---|---|---|---|---|---|---|
| G | 0 | Tyrell Jones | 6 ft 1 in (1.85 m) | 186 lb (84 kg) | Jr | Auburn | Chicago, IL |
| F | 1 | Lance Thomas | 6 ft 9 in (2.06 m) | 224 lb (102 kg) | GS | Memphis | Norcross, GA |
| G | 2 | Greg Parham | 6 ft 3 in (1.91 m) | 184 lb (83 kg) | GS | VMI | Richmond, VA |
| G | 3 | Andrew Anderson | 6 ft 0 in (1.83 m) | 160 lb (73 kg) | So | Tipton-Rosemark Academy | Memphis, TN |
| F | 4 | Kayo Goncalves | 6 ft 8 in (2.03 m) | 212 lb (96 kg) | GS | Southeastern Oklahoma State | Rio de Janeiro, Brazil |
| F | 10 | Diante Smith | 6 ft 6 in (1.98 m) | 189 lb (86 kg) | Jr | TCU | Fort Walton Beach, FL |
| F | 12 | Alex Anderson | 6 ft 6 in (1.98 m) | 185 lb (84 kg) | Fr | Tipton-Rosemark Academy | Memphis, TN |
| F | 13 | Javon Franklin | 6 ft 7 in (2.01 m) | 220 lb (100 kg) | Sr | Auburn | Little Rock, AR |
| G | 14 | Adam Sizemore | 5 ft 9 in (1.75 m) | 166 lb (75 kg) | Jr | North Laurel HS | London, KY |
| F | 20 | Marshall Kearing | 6 ft 9 in (2.06 m) | 225 lb (102 kg) | Jr | State College of Florida | Pinjarra, Australia |
| G | 21 | Charles Manning Jr. | 6 ft 4 in (1.93 m) | 193 lb (88 kg) | Sr | LSU | Riverhead, NY |
| G | 22 | Jay Jay Chandler | 6 ft 4 in (1.93 m) | 180 lb (82 kg) | GS | Texas A&M | Katy, TX |
| F | 24 | Tyler Shirley | 6 ft 6 in (1.98 m) | 212 lb (96 kg) | Fr | Pebblebrook HS | Gary, IN |
| F | 25 | Jamal West | 6 ft 5 in (1.96 m) | 224 lb (102 kg) | So | St. Frances Academy | Baltimore, MD |

Head coach

- Richie Riley (Eastern Kentucky)

Assistant coach(es)

- Adam Howard (Western Kentucky)
- Tyler Parker (Faulkner)
- Rodney Crawford (Cincinnati)

Legend

- (C) Team captain
- (S) Suspended
- (I) Ineligible
- (W) Walk-on
- Injured
- Current redshirt

Roster
Last update: December 23, 2021

== Schedule and results ==
| Date time, TV | Rank^{#} | Opponent^{#} | Result | Record | High points | High rebounds | High assists | Site (attendance) city, state |
Non-conference regular season
| November 9, 2021*; 7:00 pm, ESPN+ | | Spring Hill | W 102–41 | 1–0 | 21 – Chandler | 9 – Franklin | 4 – Jones | Mitchell Center (2,037); Mobile, AL |
| November 13, 2021*; 3:00 pm, ESPN+ | | at Wichita State | L 58–64 | 1–1 | 18 – Franklin | 12 – Franklin | 2 – 2 Tied | Charles Koch Arena (8,507); Wichita, KS |
| November 16, 2021*; 6:30 pm, SECN+/ESPN+ | | at No. 14 Alabama | L 68–73 | 1–2 | 23 – Manning Jr. | 11 – Franklin | 4 – Manning Jr. | Coleman Coliseum (9,038); Tuscaloosa, AL |
| November 20, 2021*; 3:00 pm, ESPN+ | | Mobile | W 78–45 | 2–2 | 15 – Chandler | 16 – Kearing | 5 – Manning Jr. | Mitchell Center (1,549); Mobile, AL |
| November 22, 2021*; 7:00 pm, ESPN+ | | William Carey | W 96–53 | 3–2 | 22 – Chandler | 10 – Kearing | 4 – Manning Jr. | Mitchell Center (1,386); Mobile, AL |
| November 25, 2021*; 12:30 pm | | vs. San Diego; Las Vegas Classic Semifinals | W 68–67 | 4–2 | 21 – 2 Tied | 7 – Smith | 5 – Manning Jr. | Orleans Arena; Paradise, NV |
| November 26, 2021*; 5:00 pm | | vs. Hawaiʻi; Las Vegas Classic Championship | W 72–69 | 5–2 | 25 – Manning Jr. | 7 – Manning Jr. | 4 – Chandler | Orleans Arena; Paradise, NV |
| November 29, 2021*; 7:00 pm, ESPN+ | | Texas A&M–Commerce | W 69–66 | 6–2 | 20 – Manning Jr. | 7 – 2 Tied | 5 – Manning Jr. | Mitchell Center (1,654); Mobile, AL |
| December 1, 2021*; 7:00 pm, ESPN+ | | Southern Miss | W 85–55 | 7–2 | 22 – Franklin | 9 – Franklin | 6 – Chandler | Mitchell Center (2,418); Mobile, AL |
| December 4, 2021*; 7:30 pm, ESPN+ | | at Jacksonville State | W 74–64 | 8–2 | 22 – Manning Jr. | 7 – Chandler | 2 – 2 Tied | Pete Mathews Coliseum (804); Jacksonville, AL |
| December 14, 2021*; 7:00 pm, ESPN+ | | Tarleton State | W 69–62 | 9–2 | 17 – Manning Jr. | 8 – Franklin | 5 – Manning Jr. | Mitchell Center (1,607); Mobile, AL |
| December 17, 2021*; 7:00 pm, ESPN+ | | at Tarleton State | L 52–65 | 9–3 | 23 – Chandler | 8 – Goncalves | 3 – Al. Anderson | Wisdom Gym (802); Stephenville, TX |
| December 21, 2021*; 7:00 pm, ESPN+ | | SIU Edwardsville | W 84–69 | 10–3 | 22 – Chandler | 9 – Franklin | 6 – Manning Jr. | Mitchell Center (1,794); Mobile, AL |
Sun Belt Conference regular season
| December 30, 2021; 7:00 pm, ESPN+ | | at UT Arlington | L 87–89 ^{OT} | 10–4 (0–1) | 26 – Manning Jr. | 15 – Franklin | 5 – Chandler | College Park Center (1,200); Arlington, TX |
| January 1, 2022; 4:00 pm, ESPN+ | | at Texas State | Canceled due to COVID-19 issues | | | | | Strahan Arena; San Marcos, TX |
| January 6, 2022; 7:00 pm, ESPN+ | | Appalachian State | L 64–72 | 10–5 (0–2) | 19 – Chandler | 8 – Manning, Jr. | 4 – Manning, Jr. | Mitchell Center (1,520); Mobile, AL |
| January 8, 2022; 3:00 pm, ESPN+ | | Coastal Carolina | Canceled due to COVID-19 issues | | | | | Mitchell Center; Mobile, AL |
| January 13, 2022; 8:00 pm, ESPN2 | | Georgia State | W 74–65 | 11–5 (1–2) | 20 – Manning, Jr. | 10 – Franklin | 6 – Manning, Jr. | Mitchell Center (2,354); Mobile, AL |
| January 15, 2022; 4:00 pm, ESPN+ | | Georgia Southern | W 73–67 | 12–5 (2–2) | 19 – 2 Tied | 12 – Franklin | 3 – 3 Tied | Mitchell Center (1,926); Mobile, AL |
| January 20, 2022; 7:00 pm, ESPN+ | | at Louisiana | W 77–70 | 13–5 (3–2) | 20 – Manning, Jr. | 5 – 3 Tied | 5 – 2 Tied | Cajundome (2,853); Lafayette, LA |
| January 22, 2022; 2:00 pm, ESPN+ | | at Louisiana–Monroe | W 68–56 | 14–5 (4–2) | 21 – Chandler | 5 – Franklin | 6 – Manning, Jr. | Fant–Ewing Coliseum (2,766); Monroe, LA |
| January 27, 2022; 7:00 pm, ESPN+ | | Troy | W 82–63 | 15–5 (5–2) | 26 – Chandler | 8 – Franklin | 6 – Manning, Jr. | Mitchell Center (4,146); Mobile, AL |
| January 29, 2022; 4:00 pm, ESPN+ | | at Troy | L 68–77 | 15–6 (5–3) | 20 – 2 Tied | 11 – Franklin | 2 – 4 Tied | Trojan Arena (4,546); Troy, AL |
| February 3, 2022; 6:00 pm, ESPN+ | | at Georgia Southern | L 57–58 | 15–7 (5–4) | 15 – Chandler | 8 – Franklin | 2 – 2 Tied | Hanner Fieldhouse (1,886); Statesboro, GA |
| February 5, 2022; 2:00 pm, ESPN+ | | at Georgia State | L 62–69 | 15–8 (5–5) | 26 – Chandler | 8 – Smith | 2 – 3 Tied | GSU Sports Arena (1,377); Atlanta, GA |
| February 10, 2022; 7:00 pm, ESPN+ | | Little Rock | W 77–46 | 16–8 (6–5) | 14 – Chandler | 6 – Franklin | 5 – Chandler | Mitchell Center (1,727); Mobile, AL |
| February 12, 2022; 6:00 pm, ESPN+ | | Arkansas State | W 70–51 | 17–8 (7–5) | 22 – Chandler | 8 – Franklin | 3 – Chandler | Mitchell Center (2,674); Mobile, AL |
| February 17, 2022; 6:00 pm, ESPN+ | | at Coastal Carolina | W 71–68 | 18–8 (8–5) | 17 – Chandler | 14 – Franklin | 8 – Chandler | HTC Center (1,030); Conway, SC |
| February 19, 2022; 4:30 pm, ESPN+ | | at Appalachian State | L 51–69 | 18–9 (8–6) | 14 – Kearing | 6 – Franklin | 3 – Manning Jr. | Holmes Center (4,508); Boone, NC |
| February 23, 2022; 7:00 pm, ESPN+ | | Texas State | L 52–55 | 18–10 (8–7) | 16 – Franklin | 8 – Franklin | 5 – Chandler | Mitchell Center (1,847); Mobile, AL |
| February 25, 2022; 7:00 pm, ESPN+ | | UT Arlington | W 62–52 | 19–10 (9–7) | 17 – Manning Jr. | 9 – Smith | 5 – Manning Jr. | Mitchell Center (963); Mobile, AL |
Sun Belt tournament
| March 3, 2022; 2:00 pm, ESPN+ | (5) | vs. (12) Little Rock; First round | L 71–75 | 19–11 | 26 – Manning Jr. | 9 – Franklin | 4 – Jones | Pensacola Bay Center (85); Pensacola, FL |
The Basketball Classic
| March 16, 2022*; 7:00 p.m., ESPN+ | | Southeastern Louisiana; First Round - The Travis Grant Game | W 70–68 | 20–11 | 17 – 2 Tied | 14 – Franklin | 6 – Manning Jr. | Mitchell Center (885); Mobile, AL |
| March 21, 2022*; 7:00 p.m., ESPN+ | | USC Upstate; Second Round | W 83–79 | 21–11 | 28 – Franklin | 7 – Franklin | 6 – Jones | Mitchell Center (699); Mobile, AL |
| March 28, 2022*; 7:00 p.m., ESPN+ | | Coastal Carolina; Semifinals | L 68–69 ^{OT} | 21–12 | – | – | – | Mitchell Center (1,013); Mobile, AL |
*Non-conference game. ^{#}Rankings from AP Poll. (#) Tournament seedings in parentheses. All times are in Central.
