= 2021–22 Arkansas State Red Wolves men's basketball team =

American college basketball season

2021–22 Arkansas State Red Wolves men's basketball
- Conference: Sun Belt Conference
- Record: 18–11 (8–7 Sun Belt)
- Head coach: Mike Balado (5th season)
- Assistant coaches: Brent Crews; Mike Scutero; Ian Young
- Home arena: First National Bank Arena

2021–22 Sun Belt Conference men's basketball standings
	Conf.				Overall
Team	W		L	PCT	W		L	PCT
Texas State	12	–	3	.800	21	–	8	.724
Appalachian State	12	–	6	.667	19	–	15	.559
Georgia State †	9	–	5	.643	18	–	11	.621
Troy	10	–	6	.625	20	–	12	.625
South Alabama	9	–	7	.563	21	–	12	.636
Arkansas State	8	–	7	.533	18	–	11	.621
Coastal Carolina	8	–	8	.500	19	–	14	.576
Louisiana	8	–	9	.471	16	–	15	.516
UT Arlington	7	–	10	.412	11	–	18	.379
Georgia Southern	5	–	11	.313	13	–	16	.448
Louisiana–Monroe	5	–	13	.278	13	–	18	.419
Little Rock	3	–	11	.214	9	–	19	.321
† 2022 Sun Belt Tournament winner

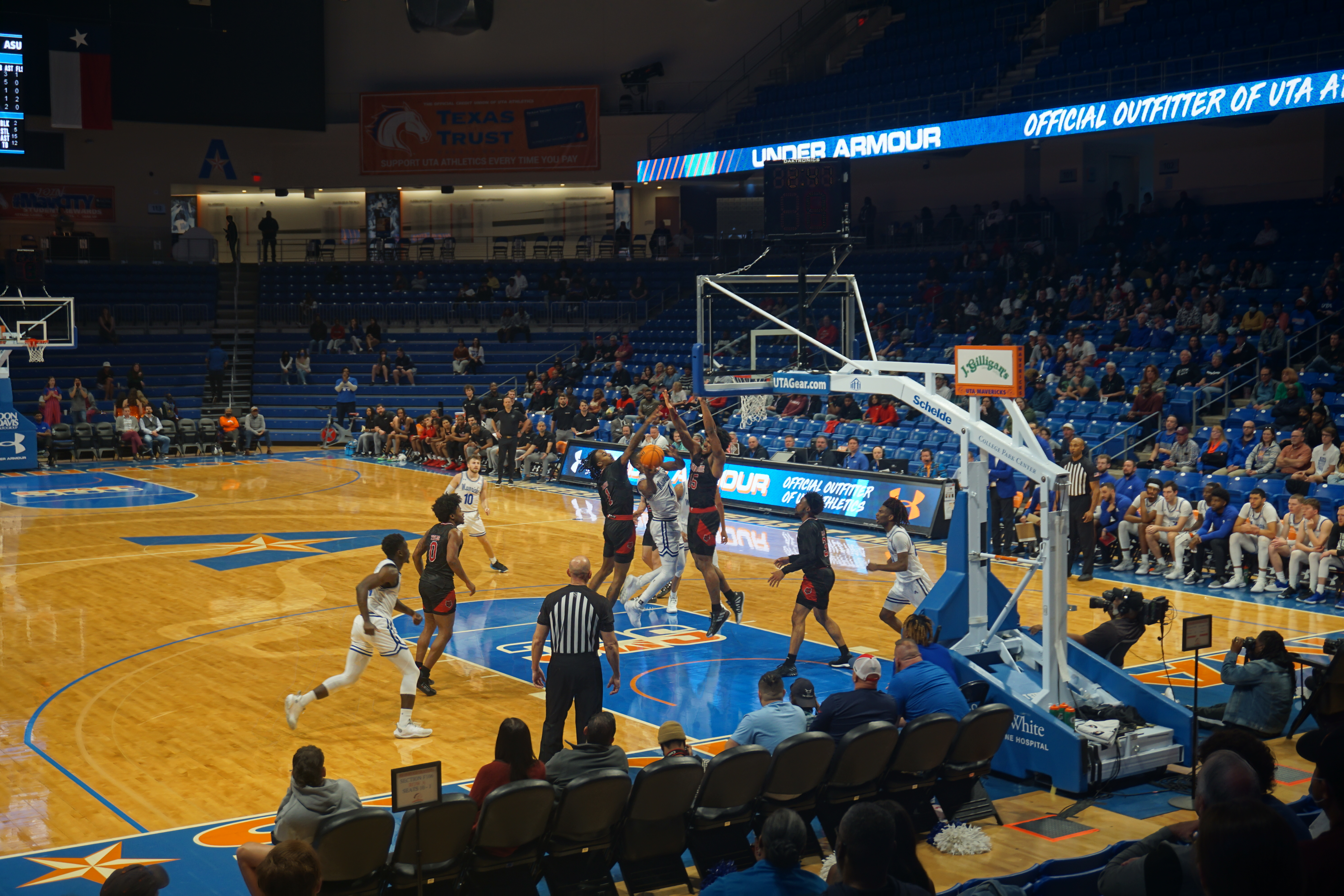
Arkansas State in action at UT Arlington

The 2021–22 Arkansas State Red Wolves men's basketball team represented Arkansas State University in the 2021–22 NCAA Division I men's basketball season. The Red Wolves, led by fifth-year head coach Mike Balado, played their home games at the First National Bank Arena in Jonesboro, Arkansas as members of the Sun Belt Conference. They finished the season 18–11, 8–7 in Sun Belt play to finish in sixth place. They defeated Louisiana–Monroe in the first round of the Sun Belt tournament before losing to Georgia State in the quarterfinals.

== Previous season ==
In a season limited due to the ongoing COVID-19 pandemic, the Red Wolves finished the 2020–21 season 11–13, 7–8 in Sun Belt play to finish in fourth place in the West Division. In the first round of the Sun Belt tournament, they defeated Georgia Southern, before falling to Georgia State in the quarterfinals.

== Roster ==
2021–22 Arkansas State Red Wolves men's basketball team
Players
Coaches

Pos.	#	Name	Height	Weight	Year	Hometown
G	0	Caleb Fields	6 ft 0 in (1.83 m)	192 lb (87 kg)	So	Lewisburg, Tennessee
G/F	1	Markise Davis	6 ft 8 in (2.03 m)	195 lb (88 kg)	Jr	Oxford, Alabama
G	2	Avery Felts	6 ft 2 in (1.88 m)	192 lb (87 kg)	RS Fr	Jonesboro, Arkansas
G	3	Desi Sills	6 ft 2 in (1.88 m)	195 lb (88 kg)	Jr	Jonesboro, Arkansas
G	5	Christian Willis	6 ft 2 in (1.88 m)	195 lb (88 kg)	Sr	Belleville, Illinois
G	10	Malcolm Farrington	6 ft 3 in (1.91 m)	201 lb (91 kg)	RS Fr	West Palm Beach, Florida
F	11	Lazar Grbovic	6 ft 8 in (2.03 m)	230 lb (104 kg)	Fr	Belgrade, Serbia
G	12	Nicolas Tingling	6 ft 1 in (1.85 m)	180 lb (82 kg)	Fr	Port St. Lucie, Florida
G	13	Mario Fantina	6 ft 4 in (1.93 m)	192 lb (87 kg)	Fr	Sveti Filip i Jakov, Croatia
F	15	Norchad Omier	6 ft 7 in (2.01 m)	232 lb (105 kg)	Fr	Bluefields, Nicaragua
F	21	Cheikh Ndour	6 ft 7 in (2.01 m)	228 lb (103 kg)	Fr	Médina, Senegal
F	22	Keyon Wesley	6 ft 9 in (2.06 m)	176 lb (80 kg)	Jr	Chesilhurst, New Jersey
G	23	Marquis Eaton	6 ft 2 in (1.88 m)	202 lb (92 kg)	Sr	Helena, Arkansas
G	24	Caleb London	6 ft 4 in (1.93 m)	195 lb (88 kg)	Fr	Memphis, Tennessee
F	50	Antwon Jackson	6 ft 7 in (2.01 m)	280 lb (127 kg)	So	Las Vegas, Nevada

Head coach

- Mike Balado (St. Thomas)

Assistant coach(es)

- Brent Crews (Florida Atlantic)
- Mike Scutero (UCF)
- Ian Young (Auburn)

Legend

- (C) Team captain
- (S) Suspended
- (I) Ineligible
- (W) Walk-on
- Injured
- Current redshirt

Roster
Last update: December 11, 2021

== Schedule and results ==
Date time, TV	Rank^{#}	Opponent^{#}	Result	Record	High points	High rebounds	High assists	Site (attendance) city, state
Exhibition
November 1, 2021*; 7:00 pm		Blue Mountain	W 72–66	–	22 – Omier	17 – Omier	6 – Eaton	First National Bank Arena (881); Jonesboro, AR
Non-conference regular season
November 9, 2021*; 7:30 pm, ESPN3		Harding	W 81–55	1–0	21 – Sills	12 – Omier	4 – Fields	First National Bank Arena (1,817); Jonesboro, AR
November 12, 2021*; 8:00 pm, BTN+		at No. 11 Illinois	L 53–92	1–1	15 – Eaton	5 – Omier	5 – Fields	State Farm Center (14,327); Champaign, IL
November 15, 2021*; 7:30 pm, ESPN+		Central Baptist	W 90–63	2–1	16 – Omier	6 – 3 Tied	7 – 2 Tied	First National Bank Arena (1,413); Jonesboro, AR
November 19, 2021*; 6:30 pm, ESPN+		at Southeast Missouri State	W 72–60	3–1	18 – Omier	12 – Omier	7 – Fields	Show Me Center (1,145); Cape Girardeau, MO
November 26, 2021*; 7:00 pm, ESPN+		Morehead State; Collegeinsider.com Eracism Invitational	L 51–75	3–2	15 – Sills	8 – Omier	5 – Eaton	First National Bank Arena (1,132); Jonesboro, AR
November 28, 2021*; 3:00 pm, ESPN+		Kansas City; Collegeinsider.com Eracism Invitational	W 66–55	4–2	18 – Sills	8 – Omier	5 – 2 Tied	First National Bank Arena (801); Jonesboro, AR
December 4, 2021*; 4:00 pm, ESPN+		Central Arkansas	W 95–82	5–2	19 – 2 Tied	13 – Omier	6 – Fields	First National Bank Arena (951); Jonesboro, AR
December 8, 2021*; 7:00 pm, UAPB Sports Network		at Arkansas–Pine Bluff	W 84–73	6–2	25 – Sills	12 – Omier	4 – 2 Tied	H. O. Clemmons Arena (3,148); Pine Bluff, AR
December 11, 2021*; 4:00 pm, YouTube		at Mississippi Valley State	W 82–77	7–2	18 – Eaton	15 – Omier	6 – Fields	Harrison HPER Complex (237); Itta Bena, MS
December 14, 2021*; 7:00 pm, ESPN+		at No. 25 Texas Tech	L 62–75	7–3	17 – Davis	7 – Omier	9 – Sills	United Supermarkets Arena (12,431); Lubbock, TX
December 19, 2021*; 1:00 pm, ESPN+		Air Force	W 68–46	8–3	22 – Omier	16 – Omier	4 – Fields	First National Bank Arena (945); Jonesboro, AR
December 21, 2021*; 4:00 pm, ESPN+		Lyon	W 88–66	9–3	31 – Omier	10 – Omier	6 – Fields	First National Bank Arena (615); Jonesboro, AR
Sun Belt Conference regular season
December 30, 2021; 7:00 pm, ESPN+		Georgia State	Canceled due to COVID-19 issues					First National Bank Arena; Jonesboro, AR
January 1, 2022; 4:00 pm, ESPN+		Georgia Southern	W 74–56	10–3 (1–0)	18 – Omier	11 – Omier	4 – 2 Tied	First National Bank Arena (1,012); Jonesboro, AR
January 6, 2022; 7:00 pm, ESPN+		at Louisiana	L 77–83 ^{OT}	10–4 (1–1)	29 – Omier	17 – Omier	7 – Fields	Cajundome (2,682); Lafayette, LA
January 8, 2022; 2:00 pm, ESPN+		at Louisiana–Monroe	W 90–83	11–4 (2–1)	25 – Eaton	11 – 2 Tied	8 – Sills	Fant–Ewing Coliseum (2,245); Monroe, LA
January 13, 2022; 7:30 pm, ESPN+		Little Rock	Canceled due to COVID-19 issues					First National Bank Arena; Jonesboro, AR
January 15, 2022; 4:00 pm, ESPN+		at Little Rock	Canceled due to COVID-19 issues					Jack Stephens Center; Little Rock, AR
January 20, 2022; 7:00 pm, ESPN+		UT Arlington	W 75–70	12–4 (3–1)	18 – Omier	16 – Omier	8 – Eaton	First National Bank Arena (1,161); Jonesboro, AR
January 22, 2022; 2:00 pm, ESPN+		Texas State	W 67–60	13–4 (4–1)	23 – Omier	13 – Omier	7 – Fields	First National Bank Arena (1,716); Jonesboro, AR
January 27, 2022; 5:30 pm, ESPN+		at Appalachian State	L 54–61	13–5 (4–2)	13 – Eaton	10 – Omier	4 – Fields	Holmes Center (3,045); Boone, NC
January 29, 2022; 12:00 pm, ESPN+		at Coastal Carolina	W 73–66	14–5 (5–2)	22 – Omier	10 – Omier	4 – 2 Tied	HTC Center (1,282); Conway, SC
February 3, 2022; 7:00 pm, ESPN+		Louisiana–Monroe	L 59–60	14–6 (5–3)	23 – Omier	26 – Omier	8 – Eaton	First National Bank Arena (1,003); Jonesboro, AR
February 5, 2022; 4:00 pm, ESPN+		Louisiana	W 67–58	15–6 (6–3)	15 – Sills	17 – Omier	9 – Fields	First National Bank Arena (2,542); Jonesboro, AR
February 10, 2022; 6:30 pm, ESPN+		at Troy	L 77–79	15–7 (6–4)	31 – Omier	11 – Omier	6 – Fields	Trojan Arena (2,917); Troy, AL
February 12, 2022; 6:00 pm, ESPN+		at South Alabama	L 51–70	15–8 (6–5)	10 – Eaton	9 – Omier	2 – Tied	Mitchell Center (2,674); Mobile, AL
February 17, 2022; 7:00 pm, ESPN+		at Texas State	L 67–84	15–9 (6–6)	14 – Omier	9 – Omier	3 – Sills	Strahan Arena (5,388); San Marcos, TX
February 19, 2022; 2:00 pm, ESPN+		at UT Arlington	W 58–49	16–9 (7–6)	22 – Omier	16 – Omier	6 – Davis	College Park Center (1,912); Arlington, TX
February 23, 2022; 7:00 pm, ESPN+		Coastal Carolina	L 69–74	16–10 (7–7)	23 – Omier	15 – Omier	6 – Eaton	First National Bank Arena (819); Jonesboro, AR
February 25, 2022; 7:00 pm, ESPN+		Appalachian State	W 62–60	17–10 (8–7)	16 – Sills	8 – Omier	5 – Fields	First National Bank Arena (2,967); Jonesboro, AR
Sun Belt tournament
March 3, 2022; 5:00 pm, ESPN+	(6)	vs. (11) Louisiana–Monroe; First round	W 81–77	18–10	35 – Omier	13 – Omier	5 – Eaton	Pensacola Bay Center (1,121); Pensacola, FL
March 5, 2022; 5:00 pm, ESPN+	(6)	vs. (3) Georgia State; Quarterfinals	L 62–65	18–11	21 – Omier	17 – Omier	4 – Eaton	Pensacola Bay Center (2,452); Pensacola, FL
*Non-conference game. ^{#}Rankings from AP Poll. (#) Tournament seedings in parentheses. All times are in Central.
