= 2021–22 Georgia State Panthers men's basketball team =

American college basketball season

2021–22 Georgia State Panthers men's basketball

Sun Belt tournament champions

NCAA tournament, first round
- Conference: Sun Belt Conference
- East Division
- Record: 18–11 (9–5 Sun Belt)
- Head coach: Rob Lanier (3rd season)
- Assistant coaches: Jarvis Hayes (3rd season); Chris Kreider (3rd season); Cliff Warren (3rd season)
- Home arena: GSU Sports Arena

2021–22 Sun Belt Conference men's basketball standings
	Conf.				Overall
Team	W		L	PCT	W		L	PCT
Texas State	12	–	3	.800	21	–	8	.724
Appalachian State	12	–	6	.667	19	–	15	.559
Georgia State †	9	–	5	.643	18	–	11	.621
Troy	10	–	6	.625	20	–	12	.625
South Alabama	9	–	7	.563	21	–	12	.636
Arkansas State	8	–	7	.533	18	–	11	.621
Coastal Carolina	8	–	8	.500	19	–	14	.576
Louisiana	8	–	9	.471	16	–	15	.516
UT Arlington	7	–	10	.412	11	–	18	.379
Georgia Southern	5	–	11	.313	13	–	16	.448
Louisiana–Monroe	5	–	13	.278	13	–	18	.419
Little Rock	3	–	11	.214	9	–	19	.321
† 2022 Sun Belt Tournament winner

The 2021–22 Georgia State Panthers men's basketball team represented Georgia State University during the 2021–22 NCAA Division I men's basketball season. The Panthers, led by third-year head coach Rob Lanier, played their home games at the GSU Sports Arena in Atlanta, Georgia as members of the Sun Belt Conference. They finished the season 18–11, 9–5 in Sun Belt play to finish in third place. They defeated Arkansas State, Appalachian State, and Louisiana to win the Sun Belt tournament championship. As a result, they received the conference's automatic bid to the NCAA tournament as the No. 16 seed in the West region. They lost in the first round to overall No. 1 seed Gonzaga.

The season marked the Panthers' final season at the GSU Sports Arena, with the new GSU Convocation Center set to open for the 2022–23 season.

On March 27, 2022, head coach Rob Lanier left the school to take the head coaching position at SMU. On April 6, the school named Xavier assistant and former University of Georgia player Jonas Hayes the team's new basketball coach.

== Previous season ==
In a season limited due to the ongoing COVID-19 pandemic, the Panthers finished the 2020–21 season 16–6, 8–4 in Sun Belt play to finish win the East division (divisions were created to cut down on travel due to the COVID-19 pandemic). As the No. 1 seed in the Sun Belt tournament, they defeated Arkansas State and Louisiana before losing to Appalachian State in the championship game.

== Roster ==
2021–22 Georgia State Panthers men's basketball team
Players
Coaches

Pos.	#	Name	Height	Weight	Year	Previous school	Hometown
G	0	Evan Johnson	5 ft 11 in (1.8 m)	165 lb (75 kg)	So	Oak Hill Academy	Durham, NC
F	1	Eliel Nsoseme	6 ft 8 in (2.03 m)	235 lb (107 kg)	Sr	The Rise Centre Academy; Cincinnati	Kinshasa, DR Congo
G	2	Justin Roberts	5 ft 10 in (1.78 m)	170 lb (77 kg)	Sr	Findlay Prep; DePaul	Indianapolis, IN
G	4	Jordan Rawls	6 ft 1 in (1.85 m)	180 lb (82 kg)	Jr	Hamilton Heights	Chattanooga, TN
G	10	Nelson Phillips	6 ft 4 in (1.93 m)	190 lb (86 kg)	RS Jr	Warner Robins HS	Warner Robins, GA
G	11	Corey Allen	6 ft 2 in (1.88 m)	195 lb (88 kg)	Sr	Ypsilanti HS; Detroit	Ypsilanti, MI
G	12	Kane Williams	6 ft 4 in (1.93 m)	190 lb (86 kg)	Sr	South Paulding HS	Douglasville, GA
F	14	Chien-Hao Ma	6 ft 7 in (2.01 m)	180 lb (82 kg)	Fr	Taipei Municipal Song-Shan Senior HS	Taichung City, Taiwan
F	15	Ja'Heim Hudson	6 ft 7 in (2.01 m)	230 lb (104 kg)	Fr	Wheeler HS	Hinesville, GA
G	20	Danny Stubbs	6 ft 0 in (1.83 m)	174 lb (79 kg)	Fr	Pebblerbrook HS	Austell, GA
G	21	Kalik Brooks (W)	6 ft 5 in (1.96 m)	190 lb (86 kg)	Jr	Alpharetta HS	Alpharetta, GA
C	23	Joe Jones III	6 ft 9 in (2.06 m)	230 lb (104 kg)	RS So	The Park School	Buffalo, NY
G	24	Collin Moore	6 ft 4 in (1.93 m)	205 lb (93 kg)	So	Sunrise Christian Academy	North Little Rock, AR
F	25	Jalen Thomas	6 ft 10 in (2.08 m)	230 lb (104 kg)	Jr	University of Detroit Jesuit HS	Detroit, MI
F	30	Kaleb Scott	6 ft 6 in (1.98 m)	235 lb (107 kg)	So	Holly Springs HS	Fuquay-Varina, NC
G	31	Zach Pina	6 ft 0 in (1.83 m)	165 lb (75 kg)	Jr	McIntosh HS; East Georgia State	Peachtree City, GA
F	33	Jamall Clyce	6 ft 6 in (1.98 m)	195 lb (88 kg)	Fr	Pebblebrook HS	Richmond Hill, GA

Head coach

- Rob Lanier (St. Bonaventure)

Assistant coach(es)

- Jarvis Hayes (Georgia)
- Chris Kreider (Lebanon Valley)
- Cliff Warren (Mount St. Mary's)

Legend

- (C) Team captain
- (S) Suspended
- (I) Ineligible
- (W) Walk-on
- Injured
- Current redshirt

== Schedule and results ==
Date time, TV	Rank^{#}	Opponent^{#}	Result	Record	High points	High rebounds	High assists	Site (attendance) city, state
Exhibition Matches
November 5, 2021*; 7:00 p.m.		Clayton State	W 101–56		22 – Allen	5 – Tied	5 – Tied	GSU Sports Arena (732); Atlanta, GA
Non-conference regular season
November 9, 2021*; 7:00 p.m., ESPN+		Brewton–Parker	W 97–37	1–0	20 – Allen	6 – Thomas	7 – Williams	GSU Sports Arena (1,839); Atlanta, GA
November 12, 2021*; 1:00 p.m., ESPN+		Northeastern	W 83–64	2–0	25 – Allen	7 – Phillips	6 – Allen	GSU Sports Arena (1,008); Atlanta, GA
November 16, 2021*; 7:00 p.m., ESPN+		at Richmond	L 78–94	2–1	17 – Williams	6 – Thomas	5 – Johnson	Robins Center (5,521); Richmond, VA
November 20, 2021*; 5:00 p.m.		vs. William & Mary; Legends Classic at High Point	W 77–59	3–1	23 – Williams	11 – Thomas	6 – Williams	Quebin Center (1,570); High Point, NC
November 21, 2021*; 2:00 p.m., ESPN+		at High Point; Legends Classic at High Point	W 74–66 ^{OT}	4–1	25 – Roberts	11 – Williams	4 – Williams	Qubein Center (3,112); High Point, NC
November 27, 2021*; 4:00 p.m., ESPN+		at Rhode Island	L 59–94	4–2	19 – Williams	8 – Brooks	7 – Williams	Ryan Center (4,132); Kingston, RI
December 1, 2021*; 8:00 p.m., ESPN+		Tennessee State	Cancelled due to COVID-19 protocols					GSU Sports Arena; Atlanta, GA
December 4, 2021*; 2:00 p.m., ESPN+		at Mercer	L 77–83	4–3	19 – Phillips	6 – Williams	3 – Williams	Hawkins Arena (901); Macon, GA
December 6, 2021*; 7:00 p.m., ESPN+		Voorhees	W 80–51	5–3	12 – Thomas	13 – Allen	8 – Allen	GSU Sports Arena (913); Atlanta, GA
December 14, 2021*; 8:00 p.m., SECN+/ESPN+		at Mississippi State	L 50–79	5–4	13 – Allen	5 – Allen	5 – Williams	Humphrey Coliseum (5,953); Starkville, MS
December 18, 2021*; 6:00 p.m., ESPN+		Toccoa Falls	W 92–44	6–4	23 – Allen	12 – Thomas	8 – Williams	GSU Sports Arena (846); Atlanta, GA
December 21, 2021*; 9:00 p.m., RSN/BSSE		at Georgia Tech	L 62–72 ^{OT}	6–5	15 – Allen	8 – Thomas	4 – Johnson	McCamish Pavilion (4,228); Atlanta, GA
Conference regular season
December 30, 2021; 8:00 p.m., ESPN+		at Arkansas State	Canceled due to COVID-19 protocols					First National Bank Arena; Jonesboro, AR
January 1, 2022; 5:00 p.m., ESPN+		at Little Rock	Canceled due to COVID-19 protocols					Jack Stephens Center; Little Rock, AR
January 6, 2022; 7:00 p.m., ESPN+		UT Arlington	L 63–70	6–6 (0–1)	15 – Allen	12 – Thomas	7 – Allen	GSU Sports Arena (732); Atlanta, GA
January 8, 2022; 2:00 p.m., ESPN+		Texas State	Canceled due to COVID-19 protocols					GSU Sports Arena; Atlanta, GA
January 13, 2022; 8:00 p.m., ESPN2		at South Alabama	L 65–74	6–7 (0–2)	12 – Williams	4 – 3 Tied	3 – Allen	Mitchell Center (2,354); Mobile, AL
January 15, 2022; 6:00 p.m., ESPN+		at Troy	Canceled due to COVID-19 protocols					Trojan Arena; Troy, AL
January 20, 2022; 7:00 p.m., ESPN+		Appalachian State	L 60–61	6–8 (0–3)	16 – Allen	11 – 2 Tied	5 – Roberts	GSU Sports Arena (1,196); Atlanta, GA
January 22, 2022; 2:00 p.m., ESPN+		Coastal Carolina	L 68–72 ^{OT}	6–9 (0–4)	19 – Nsoseme	15 – Nsoseme	5 – Roberts	GSU Sports Arena (1,034); Atlanta, GA
January 27, 2022; 8:00 p.m., ESPN+		at Louisiana	W 68–64	7–9 (1–4)	14 – 2 Tied	10 – Nsoseme	6 – Roberts	Cajundome (2,580); Lafayette, LA
January 29, 2022; 3:00 p.m., ESPN+		at Louisiana–Monroe	W 73–62	8–9 (2–4)	18 – 2 Tied	13 – Nsoseme	6 – Williams	Fant–Ewing Coliseum (2,007); Monroe, LA
February 3, 2022; 7:00 p.m., ESPN+		Troy	L 63–67	8–10 (2–5)	17 – Roberts	13 – Nsoseme	2 – Allen	GSU Sports Arena (1,038); Atlanta, GA
February 5, 2022; 2:00 p.m., ESPN+		South Alabama	W 69–62	9–10 (3–5)	17 – Williams	9 – Nsoseme	6 – Williams	GSU Sports Arena (1,377); Atlanta, GA
February 10, 2022; 7:00 p.m., ESPN+		at Coastal Carolina	W 61–50	10–10 (4–5)	18 – Williams	13 – Thomas	5 – Roberts	HTC Center (1,041); Conway, SC
February 12, 2022; 4:00 pm, ESPN+		at Appalachian State	W 58–49	11–10 (5–5)	16 – Thomas	12 – Nsoseme	4 – Allen	Holmes Center (3,008); Boone, NC
February 17, 2022; 7:00 p.m., ESPN+		Georgia Southern	W 79–63	12–10 (6–5)	21 – Williams	11 – Nsoseme	5 – Roberts	GSU Sports Arena (3,339); Atlanta, GA
February 19, 2022; 3:00 pm, ESPN+		at Georgia Southern	W 58–49	13–10 (7–5)	14 – Roberts	9 – Hudson	6 – Williams	Hanner Fieldhouse (3,353); Statesboro, GA
February 23, 2022; 7:00 p.m., ESPN+		Louisiana–Monroe	W 82–70	14–10 (8–5)	15 – Roberts	10 – Thomas	6 – Williams	GSU Sports Arena (1,006); Atlanta, GA
February 25, 2022; 7:00 p.m., ESPN+		Louisiana	W 65–58	15–10 (9–5)	16 – Thomas	8 – Thomas	6 – Roberts	GSU Sports Arena (1,445); Atlanta, GA
Sun Belt tournament
March 5, 2022; 5:00 pm, ESPN+	(3)	vs. (6) Arkansas State; Quarterfinals	W 65–62	16–10	23 – Williams	12 – Nsoseme	2 – Tied	Pensacola Bay Center (2,452); Pensacola, FL
March 6, 2022; 8:30 pm, ESPN+	(3)	vs. (2) Appalachian State; Semifinals	W 71–66	17–10	29 – Allen	10 – Nsoseme	8 – Allen	Pensacola Bay Center (1,289); Pensacola, FL
March 7, 2022; 7:00 pm, ESPN2	(3)	vs. (8) Louisiana; Championship	W 80–71	18–10	24 – Allen	13 – Nsoseme	6 – Allen	Pensacola Bay Center; Pensacola, FL
NCAA tournament
March 17, 2022*; 4:15 pm, TNT	(16 W)	vs. (1 W) No. 1 Gonzaga; First Round	L 72–93	18–11	16 – Allen	8 – Thomas	5 – Roberts	Moda Center (14,343); Portland, OR
*Non-conference game. ^{#}Rankings from AP Poll. (#) Tournament seedings in parentheses. W=West. All times are in Eastern Time.
