= 2021–22 Louisiana–Monroe Warhawks men's basketball team =

American college basketball season

2021–22 Louisiana–Monroe Warhawks men's basketball
- Conference: Sun Belt Conference
- Record: 13–18 (5–13 Sun Belt)
- Head coach: Keith Richard (12th season)
- Assistant coaches: Morris Scott; Alex Hausladen; Ronnie Dean
- Home arena: Fant–Ewing Coliseum

2021–22 Sun Belt Conference men's basketball standings
	Conf.				Overall
Team	W		L	PCT	W		L	PCT
Texas State	12	–	3	.800	21	–	8	.724
Appalachian State	12	–	6	.667	19	–	15	.559
Georgia State †	9	–	5	.643	18	–	11	.621
Troy	10	–	6	.625	20	–	12	.625
South Alabama	9	–	7	.563	21	–	12	.636
Arkansas State	8	–	7	.533	18	–	11	.621
Coastal Carolina	8	–	8	.500	19	–	14	.576
Louisiana	8	–	9	.471	16	–	15	.516
UT Arlington	7	–	10	.412	11	–	18	.379
Georgia Southern	5	–	11	.313	13	–	16	.448
Louisiana–Monroe	5	–	13	.278	13	–	18	.419
Little Rock	3	–	11	.214	9	–	19	.321
† 2022 Sun Belt Tournament winner

The 2021–22 Louisiana–Monroe Warhawks men's basketball team represented the University of Louisiana at Monroe in the 2021–22 NCAA Division I men's basketball season. The Warhawks, led by 12th-year head coach Keith Richard, played their home games at Fant–Ewing Coliseum in Monroe, Louisiana as members of the Sun Belt Conference.

== Previous season ==
The Warhawks finished the 2020–21 season 7–18, 5–13 in Sun Belt play to finish in last place in the West Division. They lost to South Alabama in the first round of the Sun Belt tournament.

== Roster ==
2021–22 Louisiana–Monroe Warhawks men's basketball team
Players
Coaches

Pos.	#	Name	Height	Weight	Year	Hometown
G	0	Trey Boston	6 ft 2 in (1.88 m)	165 lb (75 kg)	So	Chicago, IL
G	1	Andre Jones	6 ft 5 in (1.96 m)	191 lb (87 kg)	GS	Little Rock, AR
G	2	Koreem Ozier	6 ft 1 in (1.85 m)	190 lb (86 kg)	Jr	Racine, WI
G	3	Elijah Gonzales	5 ft 11 in (1.8 m)	170 lb (77 kg)	Jr	Clackamas, OR
F	4	Nika Metskhvarishvili	6 ft 8 in (2.03 m)	225 lb (102 kg)	So	Tbilisi, Georgia
G	5	Reginald Gee	6 ft 2 in (1.88 m)	230 lb (104 kg)	GS	Houston, TX
G	10	Langston Powell	6 ft 5 in (1.96 m)	195 lb (88 kg)	Jr	West Monroe, LA
F	13	Thomas Howell	6 ft 8 in (2.03 m)	235 lb (107 kg)	Fr	Natchitoches, LA
G/F	14	D'Marcus Hall	6 ft 5 in (1.96 m)	210 lb (95 kg)	Fr	Haughton, LA
F	21	Luke Phillips	6 ft 10 in (2.08 m)	220 lb (100 kg)	RS So	Adelaide, Australia
G/F	22	Justin Gibson	6 ft 4 in (1.93 m)	205 lb (93 kg)	Jr	Gonzales, LA
G	23	Johnnie Williams IV	6 ft 5 in (1.96 m)	180 lb (82 kg)	Fr	Sarasota, FL
G/F	24	Russell Harrison	6 ft 7 in (2.01 m)	200 lb (91 kg)	Sr	Lubbock, TX

Head coach

- Keith Richard (Louisiana–Monroe)

Assistant coach(es)

- Morris Scott (Florida A&M)
- Alex Hausladen (Arkansas)
- Ronnie Dean (Harris–Stowe State)

Legend

- (C) Team captain
- (S) Suspended
- (I) Ineligible
- (W) Walk-on
- Injured
- Current redshirt

Roster
Last update: November 16, 2021

== Schedule and results ==
Date time, TV	Rank^{#}	Opponent^{#}	Result	Record	High points	High rebounds	High assists	Site (attendance) city, state
Non-conference regular season
November 9, 2021*; 7:00 pm, SECN+		at LSU	L 39–101	0–1	8 – Howell	4 – 2 Tied	3 – Gonzales	Pete Maravich Assembly Center (9,969); Baton Rouge, LA
November 12, 2021*; 7:00 pm, SECN+		at No. 22 Auburn	L 65–93	0–2	16 – Boston	7 – Metskhvarishvili	3 – Ozier	Auburn Arena (4,105); Auburn, AL
November 16, 2021*; 6:30 pm, ESPN+		Champion Christian	W 114–59	1–2	17 – Jones	8 – Howell	4 – 2 Tied	Fant–Ewing Coliseum (1,352); Monroe, LA
November 22, 2021*; 2:00 pm		vs. Northwestern State; Louisiana Tech Classic	W 96–66	2–2	15 – 3 Tied	11 – Howell	10 – Gonzales	Thomas Assembly Center (112); Ruston, LA
November 24, 2021*; 6:30 pm		at Louisiana Tech; Louisiana Tech Classic	L 74–96	2–3	18 – Ozier	6 – Harrison	4 – Gonzales	Thomas Assembly Center (2,233); Ruston, LA
November 28, 2021*; 2:00 pm, ESPN+		at SMU	L 67–74	2–4	15 – Ozier	8 – 2 Tied	5 – 2 Tied	Moody Coliseum (2,931); University Park, TX
December 1, 2021*; 6:30 pm, ESPN+		Centenary	W 104–67	3–4	21 – Jones	5 – 3 Tied	7 – Jones	Fant–Ewing Coliseum (1,576); Monroe, LA
December 4, 2021*; 2:00 pm, ESPN+		Northwestern State	W 84–71	4–4	25 – Harrison	7 – 2 Tied	5 – 2 Tied	Fant–Ewing Coliseum (1,321); Monroe, LA
December 8, 2021*; 6:30 pm, ESPN+		Louisiana Christian	W 89–68	5–4	24 – Harrison	8 – Jones	9 – Gonzales	Fant–Ewing Coliseum (1,221); Monroe, LA
December 14, 2021*; 6:30 pm, ESPN+		at Stephen F. Austin	W 82–69	6–4	21 – Metskhvarishvili	7 – Gonzales	6 – Jones	William R. Johnson Coliseum (1,550); Nacogdoches, TX
December 18, 2021*; 2:00 pm, ESPN+		Southern Miss	W 74–65	7–4	18 – Jones	10 – Harrison	4 – 2 Tied	Fant–Ewing Coliseum (1,423); Monroe, LA
December 20, 2021*; 7:00 pm, ESPN+		at Lamar	W 80–77	8–4	25 – Harrison	8 – Harrison	8 – Jones	Montagne Center (1,543); Beaumont, TX
Sun Belt regular season
December 30, 2021; 6:00 pm, ESPN+		at Coastal Carolina	L 64–94	8–5 (0–1)	20 – Metskhvarishvili	6 – Howell	5 – 2 Tied	HTC Center (887); Conway, SC
January 1, 2022; 3:00 pm, ESPN+		at Appalachian State	L 69–77	8–6 (0–2)	19 – Ozier	7 – Jones	9 – Gonzales	Holmes Center (2,048); Boone, NC
January 6, 2022; 6:30 pm, ESPN+		Little Rock	W 80–72	9–6 (1–2)	28 – Harrison	12 – Harrison	9 – Jones	Fant–Ewing Coliseum (1,869); Monroe, LA
January 8, 2022; 2:00 pm, ESPN+		Arkansas State	L 83–90	9–7 (1–3)	22 – Metskhvarishvili	7 – Metskhvarishvili	7 – Jones	Fant–Ewing Coliseum (2,245); Monroe, LA
January 13, 2022; 7:00 pm, ESPN3		at Texas State	L 56–80	9–8 (1–4)	15 – 2 Tied	11 – Metskhvarishvili	5 – Gonzales	Strahan Arena (1,080); San Marcos, TX
January 15, 2022; 2:00 pm, ESPN+		at UT Arlington	W 62–55 ^{OT}	10–8 (2–4)	23 – Metskhvarishvili	13 – Harrison	9 – Gonzales	College Park Center (1,107); Arlington, TX
January 20, 2022; 6:30 pm, ESPN+		Troy	L 65–73	10–9 (2–5)	15 – Harrison	9 – Metskhvarishvili	7 – Gonzales	Fant–Ewing Coliseum (2,682); Monroe, LA
January 22, 2022; 2:00 pm, ESPN+		South Alabama	L 56–68	10–10 (2–6)	13 – 2 Tied	7 – Metskhvarishvili	5 – Jones	Fant–Ewing Coliseum (2,766); Monroe, LA
January 27, 2022; 6:30 pm, ESPN+		Georgia Southern	L 45–50	10–11 (2–7)	17 – Harrison	13 – Harrison	3 – Jones	Fant–Ewing Coliseum (2,968); Monroe, LA
January 29, 2022; 2:00 pm, ESPN+		Georgia State	L 62–73	10–12 (2–8)	16 – Metskhvarishvili	5 – Ozier	6 – Ozier	Fant–Ewing Coliseum (2,007); Monroe, LA
February 3, 2022; 7:00 pm, ESPN+		at Arkansas State	W 60–59	11–12 (3–8)	21 – Jones	9 – Ozier	3 – 2 Tied	First National Bank Arena (1,003); Jonesboro, AR
February 5, 2022; 2:00 pm, ESPN+		at Little Rock	W 75–72 ^{OT}	12–12 (4–8)	30 – Jones	6 – Metskhvarishvili	5 – Gonzales	Jack Stephens Center (2,257); Little Rock, AR
February 10, 2022; 6:30 pm, ESPN+		UT Arlington	W 74–71	13–12 (5–8)	23 – Jones	7 – Jones	6 – Jones	Fant–Ewing Coliseum (1,999); Monroe, LA
February 12, 2022; 2:00 pm, ESPN+		Texas State	L 54–63	13–13 (5–9)	20 – Jones	7 – Gonzales	2 – Tied	Fant–Ewing Coliseum (1,720); Monroe, LA
February 17, 2022; 6:30 pm, ESPN+		Louisiana	L 77–78	13–14 (5–10)	26 – Jones	9 – Jones	6 – Metskhvarishvili	Fant–Ewing Coliseum (2,287); Monroe, LA
February 19, 2022; 7:00 pm, ESPN+		at Louisiana	L 74–79	13–15 (5–11)	20 – Jones	9 – Ozier	5 – Jones	Cajundome (2,850); Lafayette, LA
February 23, 2022; 6:00 pm, ESPN+		at Georgia State	L 70–82	13–16 (5–12)	14 – Jones	12 – Harrison	4 – Gonzales	GSU Sports Arena (1,006); Atlanta, GA
February 25, 2022; 6:00 pm, ESPN+		at Georgia Southern	L 75–81 ^{OT}	13–17 (5–13)	23 – Ozier	13 – Ozier	3 – Jones	Hanner Fieldhouse (1,707); Statesboro, GA
Sun Belt tournament
March 3, 2022; 5:00 pm, ESPN+	(11)	vs. (6) Arkansas State; First round	L 77–81	13–18	24 – Jones	6 – Jones	4 – Jones	Pensacola Bay Center (1,121); Pensacola, FL
*Non-conference game. ^{#}Rankings from AP Poll. (#) Tournament seedings in parentheses. All times are in Central.
