= 2021–22 Troy Trojans men's basketball team =

American college basketball season

2021–22 Troy Trojans men's basketball

Paradise Classic champion

CBI, First Round
- Conference: Sun Belt Conference
- Record: 20–12 (10–6 Sun Belt)
- Head coach: Scott Cross (3rd season)
- Assistant coaches: Kenneth Mangrum; Byron Jones; Mike Worley
- Home arena: Trojan Arena (Capacity 6,000)

2021–22 Sun Belt Conference men's basketball standings
	Conf.				Overall
Team	W		L	PCT	W		L	PCT
Texas State	12	–	3	.800	21	–	8	.724
Appalachian State	12	–	6	.667	19	–	15	.559
Georgia State †	9	–	5	.643	18	–	11	.621
Troy	10	–	6	.625	20	–	12	.625
South Alabama	9	–	7	.563	21	–	12	.636
Arkansas State	8	–	7	.533	18	–	11	.621
Coastal Carolina	8	–	8	.500	19	–	14	.576
Louisiana	8	–	9	.471	16	–	15	.516
UT Arlington	7	–	10	.412	11	–	18	.379
Georgia Southern	5	–	11	.313	13	–	16	.448
Louisiana–Monroe	5	–	13	.278	13	–	18	.419
Little Rock	3	–	11	.214	9	–	19	.321
† 2022 Sun Belt Tournament winner

The 2021–22 Troy Trojans men's basketball team represented Troy University in the 2021–22 NCAA Division I men's basketball season. The Trojans, led by third-year head coach Scott Cross, played their home games at Trojan Arena in Troy, Alabama as members of the Sun Belt Conference. They finished the season 20–12, 10–6 in SBC play to finish in fourth place. They defeated Little Rock in the quarterfinals of the SBC tournament before losing to Louisiana in the semifinals. They received an invitation to the College Basketball Invitational where they lost to Abilene Christian in the first round.

== Previous season ==
In a season limited due to the ongoing COVID-19 pandemic, the Trojans finished the 2020–21 season 11–17, 4–12 in Sun Belt play to finish in sixth place in the East Division.

== Roster ==
2021–22 Troy Trojans men's basketball team
Players
Coaches

Pos.	#	Name	Height	Weight	Year	Hometown
G	0	Kieffer Punter	6 ft 5 in (1.96 m)	175 lb (79 kg)	Jr	Bronx, NY
G	1	TK Smith	6 ft 5 in (1.96 m)	185 lb (84 kg)	Jr	Memphis, TN
G	5	Christyon Eugene	6 ft 3 in (1.91 m)	—	So	Spring, TX
F	10	Zay Williams	6 ft 9 in (2.06 m)	190 lb (86 kg)	Jr	Birmingham, AL
G	11	Desmond Williams	6 ft 1 in (1.85 m)	165 lb (75 kg)	So	Montgomery, AL
G	12	Kirk Cole	6 ft 2 in (1.88 m)	160 lb (73 kg)	Fr	Yukon, OK
F	13	Khalyl Waters	6 ft 5 in (1.96 m)	190 lb (86 kg)	Sr	Douglasville, GA
G	14	Jakevan Leftridge	6 ft 7 in (2.01 m)	180 lb (82 kg)	So	Dallas, TX
G	15	Duke Miles	6 ft 2 in (1.88 m)	175 lb (79 kg)	Fr	Montgomery, AL
G	20	Nick O'Brien	6 ft 0 in (1.83 m)	180 lb (82 kg)	Fr	Troy, AL
G	21	Duke Deen	5 ft 8 in (1.73 m)	—	Fr	Shreveport, LA
F	22	Rifen Miguel	6 ft 8 in (2.03 m)	240 lb (109 kg)	Jr	Luanda, Angola
F	23	Efe Odigie	6 ft 9 in (2.06 m)	240 lb (109 kg)	Jr	Houston, TX
F	24	Nick Stampley	6 ft 6 in (1.98 m)	210 lb (95 kg)	Sr	Broward County, FL
F	30	Christian Turner	6 ft 7 in (2.01 m)	220 lb (100 kg)	Fr	Grand Prairie, TX
F	32	Lydell Geffrard	6 ft 8 in (2.03 m)	245 lb (111 kg)	Jr	New York, NY
G	34	DJ Roberts	6 ft 1 in (1.85 m)	160 lb (73 kg)	Fr	Monroeville, AL
F	35	Nate Tshimanga	6 ft 10 in (2.08 m)	230 lb (104 kg)	Fr	Montreal, Quebec, Canada

Head coach

- Scott Cross (UT Arlington)

Assistant coach(es)

- Kenneth Mangrum (North Texas)
- Byron Jones (Eastern Kentucky)
- Mike Worley (Denver)

Legend

- (C) Team captain
- (S) Suspended
- (I) Ineligible
- (W) Walk-on
- Injured
- Current redshirt

Roster
Last update: February 6, 2022

== Schedule and results ==
Date time, TV	Rank^{#}	Opponent^{#}	Result	Record	High points	High rebounds	High assists	Site (attendance) city, state
Non-conference regular season
November 9, 2021*; 7:30pm, ESPN+		Carver	W 104–42	1–0	17 – D. Williams	8 – Z. Williams	9 – Deen	Trojan Arena (3,037); Troy, AL
November 13, 2021*; 8:00 pm, FS2		at Butler	L 59–70	1–1	13 – Odigie	6 – Deen	4 – Deen	Hinkle Fieldhouse (7,227); Indianapolis, IN
November 16, 2021*; 6:00 pm, ESPN+		Jacksonville State	W 69–65 ^{3OT}	2–1	20 – Deen	11 – Z. Williams	2 – Deen	Trojan Arena (2,159); Troy, AL
November 19, 2021*; 3:00 pm, CUSA.tv		vs. North Dakota; The Paradise Classic	L 72–74	2–2	15 – Punter	8 – Odigie	6 – Deen	FAU Arena (122); Boca Raton, FL
November 20, 2021*; 3:00 pm, CUSA.tv		vs. UT Martin; The Paradise Classic	W 80–67	3–2	17 – Deen	11 – Z. Williams	5 – Deen	FAU Arena (352); Boca Raton, FL
November 22, 2021*; 7:00 pm, CUSA.tv		at Florida Atlantic; The Paradise Classic	W 83–78 ^{OT}	4–2	17 – Deen	7 – Odigie	4 – Miles	FAU Arena (988); Boca Raton, FL
November 28, 2021*; 11:00 am, SECN		at No. 23 Florida	L 45–84	4–3	10 – Dean	7 – Odigie	2 – Dean	Exactech Arena (8,875); Gainesville, FL
December 1, 2021*; 7:30 pm, ESPN+		Rust	W 81–48	5–3	14 – D. Williams	9 – Miguel	7 – Deen	Trojan Arena (1,937); Troy, AL
December 5, 2021*; 4:00 pm, ESPN+		Southeastern Louisiana	L 68–72	5–4	18 – Odigie	10 – Odigie	4 – Tied	Trojan Arena (1,805); Troy, AL
December 11, 2021*; 1:00 pm, ESPN+		at Tennessee Tech	W 75–72	6–4	13 – Stampley	11 – Stampley	3 – Tied	Eblen Center (679); Cookeville, TN
December 14, 2021*; 6:00 pm, ESPN+		Alabama A&M	W 66–57	7–4	19 – D. Williams	7 – Z. Williams	4 – Deen	Trojan Arena (1,567); Troy, AL
December 18, 2021*; 4:00 pm, ESPN+		Arkansas Baptist	W 84–64	8–4	17 – Tied	10 – Miguel	4 – Tied	Trojan Arena (1,879); Troy, AL
December 22, 2021*; 5:00 pm, ESPN+		at Mercer	W 69–65	9–4	21 – D. Williams	9 – Z. Williams	2 – D. Williams	Hawkins Arena (1,256); Macon, GA
Sun Belt regular season
December 30, 2021; 7:00 pm, ESPN+		at Texas State	W 78–63	10–4 (1–0)	22 – Odigie	7 – Z. Williams	4 – Deen	Strahan Arena (1,122); San Marcos, TX
January 1, 2022; 2:00 pm, ESPN+		at UT Arlington	L 57–62	10–5 (1–1)	13 – Odigie	12 – Z. Williams	3 – Z. Williams	College Park Center (1,574); Arlington, TX
January 6, 2022; 6:00 pm, ESPN+		Coastal Carolina	W 69–59	11–5 (2–1)	13 – Odigie	10 – Z. Williams	3 – Leftridge	Trojan Arena (1,833); Troy, AL
January 8, 2022; 4:00 pm, ESPN+		Appalachian State	W 68–53	12–5 (3–1)	11 – Odigie	12 – Stampley	5 – Deen	Trojan Arena (0); Troy, AL
January 13, 2022; 6:00 pm, ESPN+		Georgia Southern	Canceled due to COVID-19 protocols					Trojan Arena; Troy, AL
January 15, 2022; 4:00 pm, ESPN+		Georgia State	Canceled due to COVID-19 protocols					Trojan Arena; Troy, AL
January 20, 2022; 6:30 pm, ESPN+		at Louisiana–Monroe	W 73–65	13–5 (4–1)	18 – Z. Williams	7 – Z. Williams	4 – Miles	Fant–Ewing Coliseum (2,682); Monroe, LA
January 22, 2022; 7:00 pm, ESPN+		at Louisiana	L 59–69	13–6 (4–2)	14 – Odigie	9 – Odigie	2 – Odigie	Cajundome (3,150); Lafayette, LA
January 27, 2022; 7:00 pm, ESPN+		at South Alabama	L 63–82	13–7 (4–3)	13 – Turner	8 – Williams	4 – Miles	Mitchell Center (4,146); Mobile, AL
January 29, 2022; 7:00 pm, ESPN+		South Alabama	W 77–68	14–7 (5–3)	22 – Miles	15 – Odigie	7 – Miles	Trojan Center (4,546); Troy, AL
February 3, 2022; 6:00 pm, ESPN+		at Georgia State	W 67–63	15–7 (6–3)	17 – Odigie	11 – Odigie	4 – Williams	GSU Sports Arena (1,038); Atlanta, GA
February 5, 2022; 3:00 pm, ESPN+		at Georgia Southern	W 61–52	16–7 (7–3)	12 – Odigie	6 – Punter	8 – Miles	Hanner Fieldhouse (2,144); Statesboro, GA
February 10, 2022; 6:00 pm, ESPN+		Arkansas State	W 79–77	17–7 (8–3)	19 – Odigie	7 – Williams	8 – Deen	Trojan Center (2,917); Troy, AL
February 12, 2022; 4:00 pm, ESPN+		Little Rock	L 62–66	17–8 (8–4)	14 – Eugene	9 – Turner	3 – Eugene	Trojan Center (4,128); Troy, AL
February 17, 2022; 5:30 pm, ESPN+		at Appalachian State	W 67–61	18–8 (9–4)	17 – Odigie	12 – Odigie	5 – Deen	Holmes Center (3,017); Boone, NC
February 19, 2022; 3:00 pm, ESPN+		at Coastal Carolina	L 63–73	18–9 (9–5)	10 – Tied	8 – Williams	4 – Eugene	HTC Center (1,349); Conway, SC
February 23, 2022; 6:00 pm, ESPN+		UT Arlington	W 59–53	19–9 (10–5)	15 – Williams	10 – Odigie	5 – Dean	Trojan Center (3,346); Troy, AL
February 25, 2022; 8:00 pm, ESPN2		Texas State	L 61–66	19–10 (10–6)	19 – Odigie	9 – Odigie	3 – Miles	Trojan Center (4,438); Troy, AL
Sun Belt tournament
March 5, 2022; 2:00 pm, ESPN+	(4)	vs. (12) Little Rock; Quarterfinals	W 69–62	20–10	16 – Odigie	11 – Odigie	5 – Deen	Pensacola Bay Center (2,313); Pensacola, FL
March 6, 2022; 5:00 pm, ESPN+	(4)	vs. (8) Louisiana; Semifinals	L 57–66	20–11	19 – Miles	7 – Deen	2 – Miles	Pensacola Bay Center (1,985); Pensacola, FL
CBI
March 20, 2022; 6:30 pm, FloHoops	(11)	vs. (6) Abilene Christian; First Round	L 70–82	20–12	18 – Waters	9 – Odigie	4 – Tied	Ocean Center (762); Daytona Beach, FL
*Non-conference game. ^{#}Rankings from AP Poll. (#) Tournament seedings in parentheses. All times are in Central.
