= 2021–22 UT Arlington Mavericks men's basketball team =

American college basketball season

2021–22 UT Arlington Mavericks men's basketball
- Conference: Sun Belt Conference
- West Division
- Record: 11–18 (7–10 Sun Belt)
- Head coach: Greg Young (1st season)
- Associate head coach: Royce Johnson
- Assistant coaches: Riley Davis; Dwight Thorne II
- Home arena: College Park Center

2021–22 Sun Belt Conference men's basketball standings
	Conf.				Overall
Team	W		L	PCT	W		L	PCT
Texas State	12	–	3	.800	21	–	8	.724
Appalachian State	12	–	6	.667	19	–	15	.559
Georgia State †	9	–	5	.643	18	–	11	.621
Troy	10	–	6	.625	20	–	12	.625
South Alabama	9	–	7	.563	21	–	12	.636
Arkansas State	8	–	7	.533	18	–	11	.621
Coastal Carolina	8	–	8	.500	19	–	14	.576
Louisiana	8	–	9	.471	16	–	15	.516
UT Arlington	7	–	10	.412	11	–	18	.379
Georgia Southern	5	–	11	.313	13	–	16	.448
Louisiana–Monroe	5	–	13	.278	13	–	18	.419
Little Rock	3	–	11	.214	9	–	19	.321
† 2022 Sun Belt Tournament winner

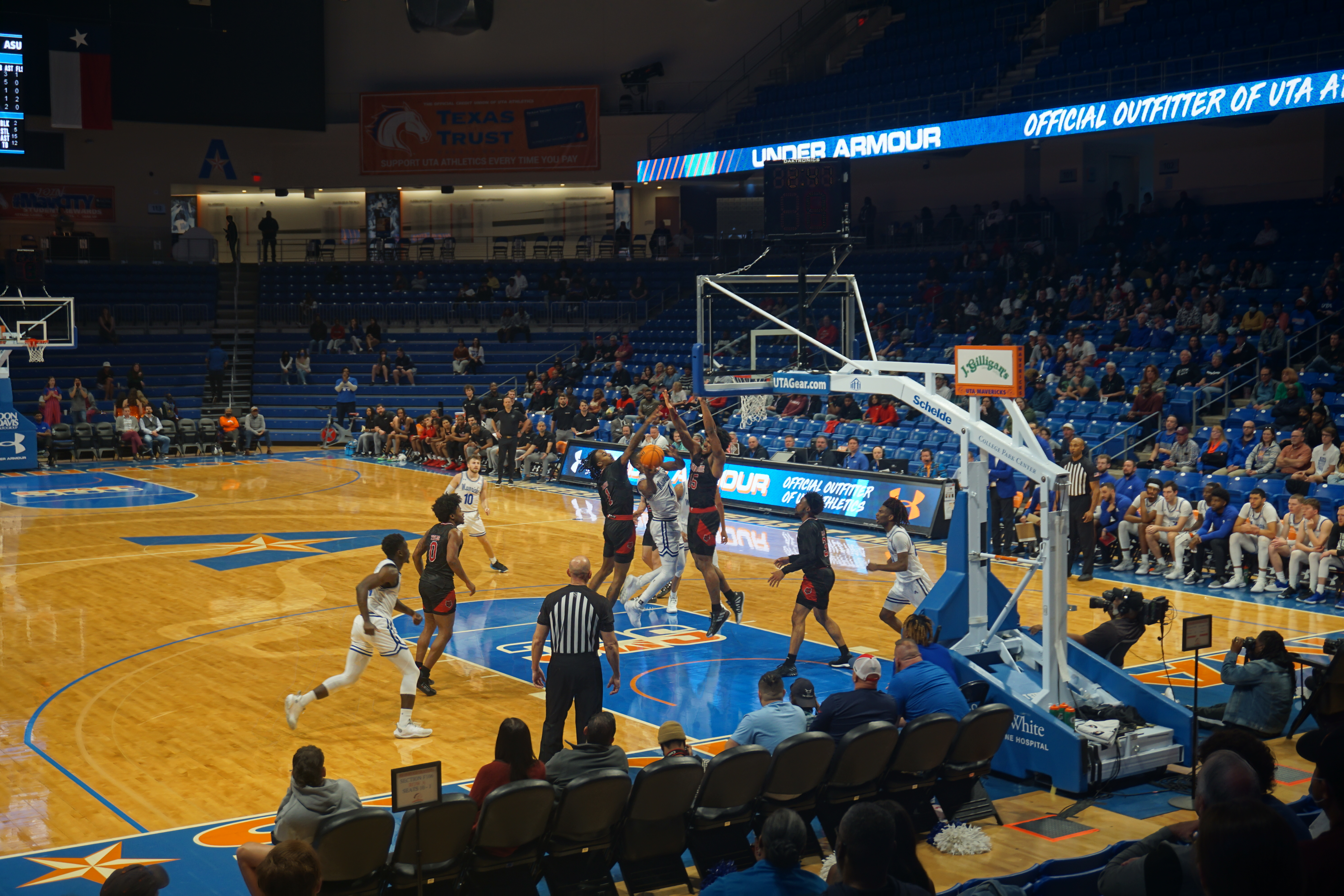
UT Arlington in action against Arkansas State

The 2021–22 UT Arlington Mavericks men's basketball team represented the University of Texas at Arlington in the 2021–22 NCAA Division I men's basketball season. The Mavericks, led by first-year head coach Greg Young, played their home games at the College Park Center in Arlington, Texas as members of the Sun Belt Conference's West Division.

On January 21, 2022, UT Arlington announced that it would be the last season for the team in the Sun Belt as they will rejoin the Western Athletic Conference on July 1, 2022.

== Previous season ==
The Mavericks finished the 2020–21 season 13–13, 9–8 in Sun Belt play to finish in third place in the West Division. They were defeated by Troy in the first round of the Sun Belt tournament.

On April 1, 2021, it was announced that head coach Chris Ogden was hired as an assistant coach at his alma mater, Texas. Four days later, on April 5, associate head coach Greg Young was elevated to head coach.

== Roster ==
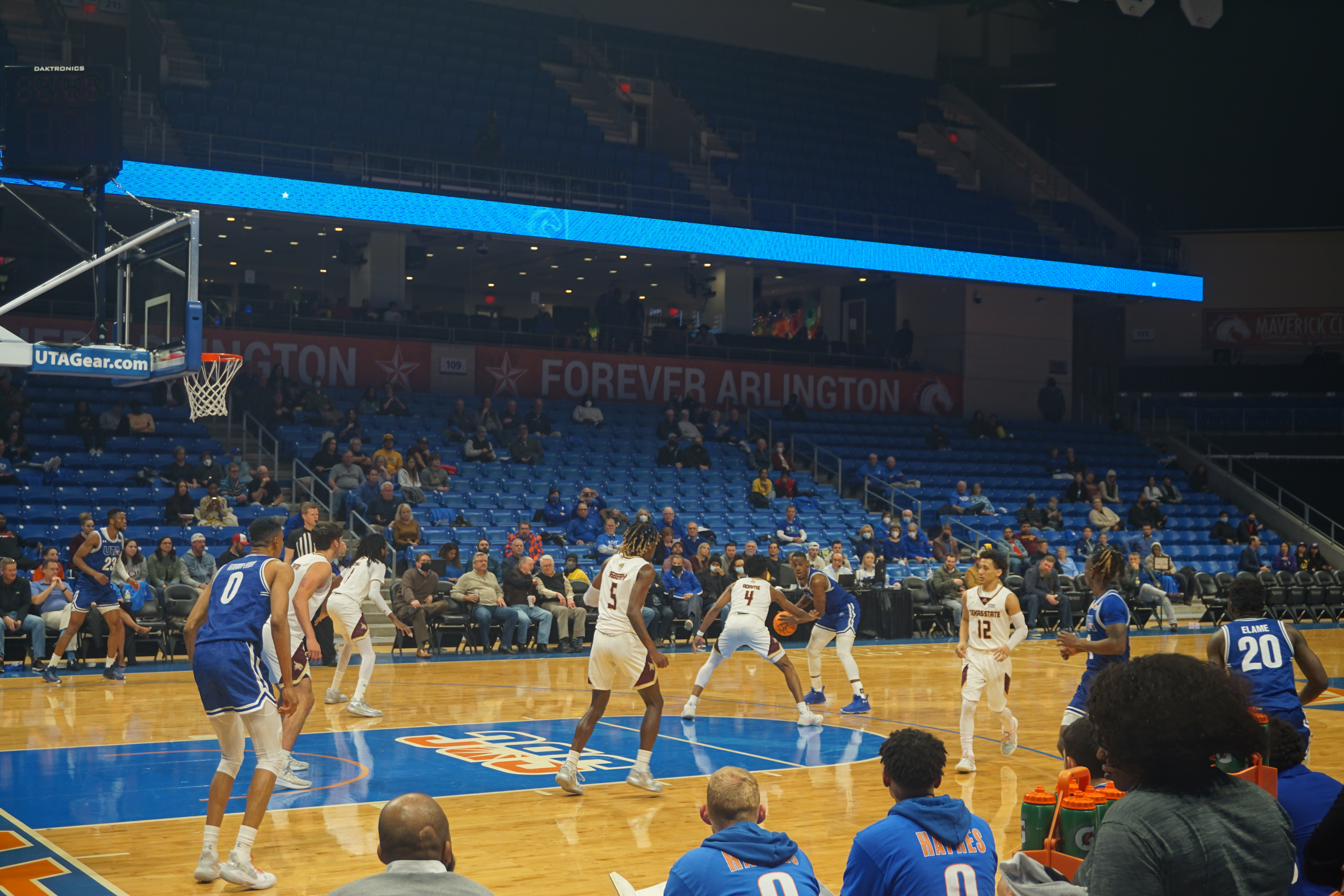
UT Arlington in action against Texas State

2021–22 UT Arlington Mavericks men's basketball team
Players
Coaches

Pos.	#	Name	Height	Weight	Year	Hometown
F	0	Kaodirichi Akobundu-Ehiogu	6 ft 9 in (2.06 m)	202 lb (92 kg)	RS So	Lagos, Nigeria
G	1	Javon Levi	5 ft 11 in (1.8 m)	163 lb (74 kg)	GS	Killeen, TX
F	2	Hayden Brittingham	6 ft 5 in (1.96 m)	209 lb (95 kg)	Fr	Fort Worth, TX
G	3	Carson Bischoff	6 ft 4 in (1.93 m)	210 lb (95 kg)	RS Jr	Ogden, UT
G	4	David Azore	6 ft 4 in (1.93 m)	211 lb (96 kg)	GS	Houston, TX
G	5	Brandyn Talbot	6 ft 5 in (1.96 m)	176 lb (80 kg)	Fr	Newmarket, Ontario
G	10	Jack Hoiberg	5 ft 11 in (1.8 m)	172 lb (78 kg)	GS	Burr Ridge, IL
F	12	Lazaro Rojas	6 ft 11 in (2.11 m)	239 lb (108 kg)	GS	Porto Seguro, Brazil
G	15	Antonio Romanelli	6 ft 0 in (1.83 m)	174 lb (79 kg)	Fr	Sydney, Australia
G	20	Nicolas Elame	6 ft 3 in (1.91 m)	192 lb (87 kg)	So	Paris, France
G	21	Pedro Castro	6 ft 6 in (1.98 m)	190 lb (86 kg)	GS	Fort Worth, TX
F	22	Shemar Wilson	6 ft 9 in (2.06 m)	225 lb (102 kg)	Fr	Avondale, AZ
F	23	Patrick Mwamba	6 ft 7 in (2.01 m)	201 lb (91 kg)	RS So	Bukavu, Congo
F	24	Montez Young Jr.	6 ft 5 in (1.96 m)	192 lb (87 kg)	Fr	Waxahachie, TX
G	55	Nathaniel Spurgeon	6 ft 0 in (1.83 m)	165 lb (75 kg)	Sr	Azle, TX

Head coach

- Greg Young (Howard Payne)

Assistant coach(es)

- Royce Johnson (Thomas Edison State)
- Riley Davis (Howard)
- Dwight Thorne II (Colorado)

Legend

- (C) Team captain
- (S) Suspended
- (I) Ineligible
- (W) Walk-on
- Injured
- Current redshirt

Roster
Last update: November 8, 2021

== Schedule and results ==
Date time, TV	Rank^{#}	Opponent^{#}	Result	Record	High points	High rebounds	High assists	Site (attendance) city, state
Exhibition
November 1, 2021*; 7:00 pm		Southeastern Oklahoma State	W 68–64	–	18 – Castro	8 – Elame	6 – Levi	College Park Center (1,294); Arlington, TX
Non-conference regular season
November 9, 2021*; 7:00 pm, ESPN+		at Oklahoma State	L 45–88	0–1	9 – Castro	5 – Levi	2 – Elame	Gallagher-Iba Arena (7,981); Stillwater, OK
November 13, 2021*; 7:00 pm, ESPN+		Mary Hardin–Baylor	W 104–75	1–1	17 – Elame	8 – Castro	10 – Levi	College Park Center (3,288); Arlington, TX
November 16, 2021*; 7:00 pm, ESPN+		Abilene Christian	L 71–80 ^{OT}	1–2	21 – Azore	8 – Azore	5 – Levi	College Park Center (1,480); Arlington, TX
November 18, 2021*; 7:00 pm		at North Texas	L 36–64	1–3	6 – Young	7 – Akobundu-Ehiogu	1 – 3 tied	The Super Pit (3,211); Denton, TX
November 20, 2021*; 9:00 pm		at San Diego State	L 62–68	1–4	17 – Castro	10 – Young Jr.	4 – Levi	Viejas Arena (11,903); San Diego, CA
November 27, 2021*; 8:00 pm		at Utah State	L 61–80	1–5	17 – Azore	6 – Rojas	4 – Levi	Smith Spectrum (8,088); Logan, UT
November 29, 2021*; 8:00 pm, ESPN+		at UC Santa Barbara	W 70–62	2–5	16 – Castro	8 – Akobudu-Ehiogu	6 – Levi	The Thunderdome (483); Santa Barbara, CA
December 7, 2021*; 7:00 pm, ESPN+		Nevada	Cancelled					College Park Center; Arlington, TX
December 11, 2021*; 2:00 pm, ESPN+		Lamar	W 56–47	3–5	21 – Buster	10 – Smith	2 – Catt	College Park Center (1,306); Arlington, TX
December 16, 2021*; 7:00 pm		at Oral Roberts	L 62–71	3–6	16 – Azore	10 – 2 Tied	4 – Levi	Mabee Center (3,238); Tulsa, OK
December 19, 2021*; 2:00 pm, BSOK		at Oklahoma	L 50–70	3–7	15 – Azore	6 – Akobundu-Ehiogu	3 – Talbot	Lloyd Noble Center (6,579); Norman, OK
December 22, 2021*; 7:00 pm, ESPN+		Howard Payne	W 95–46	4–7	14 – Wilson	8 – 2 Tied	8 – Levi	College Park Center (1,150); Arlington, TX
Sun Belt Conference regular season
December 30, 2021; 7:00 pm, ESPN+		South Alabama	W 89–87	5–7 (1–0)	30 – Azore	7 – Azore	7 – Levi	College Park Center (1,200); Arlington, TX
January 1, 2022; 2:00 pm, ESPN+		Troy	W 62–57	6–7 (2–0)	24 – Azore	7 – Azore	4 – Mwamba	College Park Center (1,574); Arlington, TX
January 6, 2022; 6:00 pm, ESPN+		at Georgia State	W 70–63	7–7 (3–0)	17 – Azore	9 – 2 Tied	8 – Levi	GSU Sports Arena (732); Atlanta, GA
January 8, 2022; 2:00 pm, ESPN+		at Georgia Southern	L 73–74 ^{OT}	7–8 (3–1)	33 – Azore	12 – Levi	4 – Elame	Hanner Fieldhouse (1,822); Statesboro, GA
January 13, 2022; 7:00 pm, ESPN+		Louisiana	W 83–73	8–8 (4–1)	22 – Mwamba	10 – Levi	10 – Levi	College Park Center (1,057); Arlington, TX
January 15, 2022; 2:00 pm, ESPN+		Louisiana–Monroe	L 55–62 ^{OT}	8–9 (4–2)	20 – Mwamba	11 – Young Jr.	5 – Elame	College Park Center (1,107); Arlington, TX
January 20, 2022; 7:00 pm, ESPN+		at Arkansas State	L 70–75	8–10 (4–3)	18 – Azore	9 – Akobundu-Ehiogu	3 – 2 Tied	First National Bank Arena (1,161); Jonesboro, AR
January 22, 2022; 2:00 pm, ESPN+		at Little Rock	L 96–98 ^{3OT}	8–11 (4–4)	37 – Azore	13 – Rojas	7 – Levi	Jack Stephens Center (1,910); Little Rock, AR
January 27, 2022; 7:00 pm, ESPN+		Texas State	W 70–58	9–11 (5–4)	15 – Mwamba	7 – 2 Tied	6 – Levi	College Park Center (1,658); Arlington, TX
January 29, 2022; 4:00 pm, ESPN+		at Texas State	L 53–58	9–12 (5–5)	23 – Azore	5 – 2 Tied	5 – Levi	Strahan Arena (3,587); San Marcos, TX
February 3, 2022; 7:00 pm, ESPN+		Coastal Carolina	Canceled due to COVID-19 issues					College Park Center; Arlington, TX
February 5, 2022; 5:00 pm, ESPN+		Appalachian State	L 61–70	9–13 (5–6)	36 – Azore	8 – Rojas	9 – Levi	College Park Center (2,075); Arlington, TX
February 10, 2022; 6:30 pm, ESPN+		at Louisiana–Monroe	L 71–74	9–14 (5–7)	29 – Azore	6 – Azore	5 – Levi	Fant–Ewing Coliseum (1,999); Monroe, LA
February 12, 2022; 2:00 pm, ESPN+		at Louisiana	W 80–77 ^{OT}	10–14 (6–7)	25 – Azore	6 – Elame	5 – Levi	Cajundome (2,591); Lafayette, LA
February 17, 2022; 7:00 pm, ESPN+		Little Rock	W 85–70	11–14 (7–7)	20 – Azore	6 – Azore	10 – Levi	College Park Center (1,777); Arlington, TX
February 19, 2022; 2:00 pm, ESPN+		Arkansas State	L 49–58	11–15 (7–8)	11 – 2 Tied	7 – Elame	3 – 2 Tied	College Park Center (1,912); Arlington, TX
February 23, 2022; 6:00 pm, ESPN+		at Troy	L 53–59	11–16 (7–9)	22 – Azore	6 – Elame	6 – Levi	Trojan Arena (3,346); Troy, AL
February 25, 2022; 7:00 pm, ESPN+		at South Alabama	L 52–62	11–17 (7–10)	22 – Azore	7 – Akobundu-Ehiogu	3 – Hoiberg	Mitchell Center (963); Mobile, AL
Sun Belt tournament
March 3, 2022; 11:30 am, ESPN+	(9)	vs. (8) Louisiana; First round	L 64–67	11–18	23 – Azore	7 – Mwamba	5 – Levi	Pensacola Bay Center (437); Pensacola, FL
*Non-conference game. ^{#}Rankings from AP Poll. (#) Tournament seedings in parentheses. All times are in Central.
