= 2021–22 Texas State Bobcats men's basketball team =

American college basketball season

2021–22 Texas State Bobcats men's basketball

Sun Belt regular season champions

NIT, First Round
- Conference: Sun Belt Conference
- Record: 21–8 (12–3 Sun Belt)
- Head coach: Terrence Johnson (2nd season)
- Associate head coach: Bennie Seltzer
- Assistant coaches: Robert Guster; Donte Mathis
- Home arena: Strahan Arena

2021–22 Sun Belt Conference men's basketball standings
	Conf.				Overall
Team	W		L	PCT	W		L	PCT
Texas State	12	–	3	.800	21	–	8	.724
Appalachian State	12	–	6	.667	19	–	15	.559
Georgia State †	9	–	5	.643	18	–	11	.621
Troy	10	–	6	.625	20	–	12	.625
South Alabama	9	–	7	.563	21	–	12	.636
Arkansas State	8	–	7	.533	18	–	11	.621
Coastal Carolina	8	–	8	.500	19	–	14	.576
Louisiana	8	–	9	.471	16	–	15	.516
UT Arlington	7	–	10	.412	11	–	18	.379
Georgia Southern	5	–	11	.313	13	–	16	.448
Louisiana–Monroe	5	–	13	.278	13	–	18	.419
Little Rock	3	–	11	.214	9	–	19	.321
† 2022 Sun Belt Tournament winner

The 2021–22 Texas State Bobcats men's basketball team represented Texas State University in the 2021–22 NCAA Division I men's basketball season. The Bobcats, led by second-year head coach Terrence Johnson, played their home games at Strahan Arena in San Marcos, Texas as members of the Sun Belt Conference. They finished the season 18–7, 12–3 in Sun Belt play to win the regular season championship. They lost in the quarterfinals of the Sun Belt tournament to Louisiana. As a regular season champion who did not win their conference tournament, they received an automatic bid to the National Invitation Tournament where they lost in the first round to North Texas.

== Previous season ==
In a season limited due to the ongoing COVID-19 pandemic, the Bobcats finished the 2020–21 season 18–7, 12–3 in Sun Belt play to finish in first place in the West Division. They were upset by Appalachian State in the quarterfinals of the Sun Belt tournament. After leading the Bobcats to their first Sun Belt regular season championship, Terrence Johnson, who had been named interim head coach after head coach Danny Kaspar resigned amid allegations of racially insensitive language used at players, was named the team's head coach.

== Roster ==
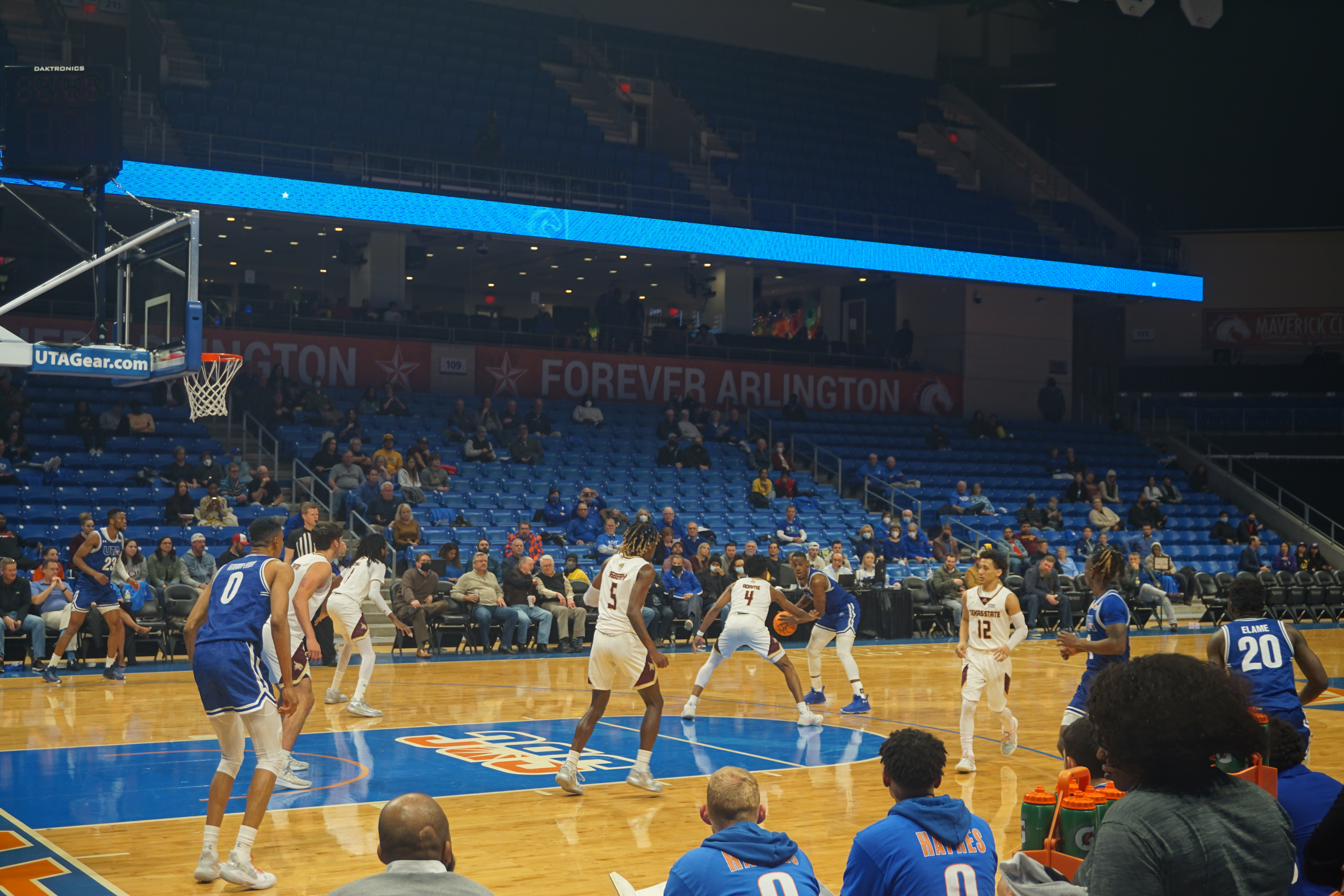
Texas State in action at UT Arlington

2021–22 Texas State Bobcats men's basketball team
Players
Coaches

Pos.	#	Name	Height	Weight	Year	Hometown
G	0	Dylan Dawson	6 ft 3 in (1.91 m)	180 lb (82 kg)	RS So	Humble, Texas
F	1	Isiah Small	6 ft 8 in (2.03 m)	170 lb (77 kg)	Sr	Jersey City, New Jersey
G	2	Davion Coleman	6 ft 2 in (1.88 m)	165 lb (75 kg)	So	Houston, Texas
G	3	Darien Jenkins	6 ft 3 in (1.91 m)	190 lb (86 kg)	RS Jr	Deer Park, New York
G	4	Shelby Adams	6 ft 3 in (1.91 m)	175 lb (79 kg)	Sr	Converse, Texas
G	5	Caleb Asberry	6 ft 3 in (1.91 m)	170 lb (77 kg)	Sr	Pflugerville, Texas
F	10	Tyrel Morgan	6 ft 5 in (1.96 m)	185 lb (84 kg)	Jr	Atlanta, Georgia
F	11	Nate Martin	6 ft 8 in (2.03 m)	215 lb (98 kg)	So	Cypress, Texas
G	12	Mason Harrell	5 ft 9 in (1.75 m)	145 lb (66 kg)	Sr	Midwest City, Oklahoma
G	14	Dalen Whitlock	6 ft 4 in (1.93 m)	—	Fr	San Antonio, Texas
G	15	Deuce Guidry	5 ft 8 in (1.73 m)	155 lb (70 kg)	So	Dickinson, Texas
F	22	Nighael Ceaser	6 ft 8 in (2.03 m)	225 lb (102 kg)	Sr	Houston, Texas
F	23	Nate Lacewell	6 ft 9 in (2.06 m)	210 lb (95 kg)	So	Missouri City, Texas
F	24	Brandon Love	6 ft 9 in (2.06 m)	208 lb (94 kg)	Fr	Houston, Texas
G	55	Drue Drinnon	6 ft 1 in (1.85 m)	180 lb (82 kg)	Jr	Smyrna, Georgia

Head coach

- Terrence Johnson (Southern)

Assistant coach(es)

- Bennie Seltzer (Washington State)
- Robert Guster (Missouri–Rolla)
- Donte Mathis (Texas State)

Legend

- (C) Team captain
- (S) Suspended
- (I) Ineligible
- (W) Walk-on
- Injured
- Current redshirt

Roster
Last update: August 11, 2022

== Schedule and results ==
Date time, TV	Rank^{#}	Opponent^{#}	Result	Record	High points	High rebounds	High assists	Site (attendance) city, state
Non-conference regular season
November 9, 2021*; 6:30 pm		at Incarnate Word	W 75–57	1–0	20 – Asberry	6 – Small	5 – Small	McDermott Center (657); San Antonio, TX
November 12, 2021*; 7:00 pm, SECN+		at LSU	L 59–84	1–1	13 – Small	9 – Small	4 – Harrell	Pete Maravich Assembly Center (11,030); Baton Rouge, LA
November 14, 2021*; 7:00 pm, SECN+		at Vanderbilt	L 60–79	1–2	16 – Harrell	9 – Martin	2 – 3 Tied	Memorial Gymnasium (5,642); Nashville, TN
November 19, 2021*; 1:00 pm		vs. Dixie State; Empire Classic	W 85–65	2–2	24 – Asberry	9 – Small	7 – Asberry	Matadome (75); Northridge, CA
November 20, 2021*; 11:00 pm		vs. Eastern Washington; Empire Classic	W 81–74	3–2	18 – Asberry	8 – Small	2 – 2 Tied	Matadome (124); Northridge, CA
November 24, 2021*; 6:00 pm, ESPN+		LeTourneau	W 92–47	4–2	12 – Ceaser	10 – Ceaser	4 – Drinnon	Strahan Arena (1,014); San Marcos, TX
November 30, 2021*; 7:00 pm		at Rice	W 80–69	5–2	24 – Harrell	9 – Asberry	3 – 2 Tied	Tudor Fieldhouse (1,365); Houston, TX
December 5, 2021*; 1:00 pm, ESPN+		Denver	W 71–58	6–2	14 – Adams	8 – Small	5 – Harrell	Strahan Arena (1,381); San Marcos, TX
December 12, 2021*; 4:00 pm, ESPN+		Southwestern	W 101–54	7–2	21 – Small	7 – Small	7 – Harrell	Strahan Arena (978); San Marcos, TX
December 15, 2021*; 7:00 pm, ESPN+		Lamar	W 67–47	8–2	14 – Adams	7 – Martin	3 – 2 Tied	Strahan Arena (1,059); San Marcos, TX
December 18, 2021*; 4:00 pm, ESPN+		Paul Quinn	W 75–36	9–2	15 – Dawson	8 – Small	4 – Asberry	Strahan Arena (942); San Marcos, TX
December 22, 2021*; 7:00 pm, ESPN+		at No. 13 Houston	L 47–80	9–3	10 – Adams	5 – Martin	3 – 2 Tied	Fertitta Center (7,488); Houston, TX
Sun Belt regular season
December 30, 2021; 7:00 pm, ESPN+		Troy	L 63–78	9–4 (0–1)	17 – Small	8 – Small	6 – Asberry	Strahan Arena (1,122); San Marcos, TX
January 1, 2022; 4:00 pm, ESPN+		South Alabama	Canceled due to COVID-19 issues					Strahan Arena; San Marcos, TX
January 6, 2022; ESPN+		at Georgia Southern	Canceled due to COVID-19 issues					Hanner Fieldhouse; Statesboro, GA
January 8, 2022; 1:00 pm, ESPN+		at Georgia State	Canceled due to COVID-19 issues					GSU Sports Arena; Statesboro, GA
January 13, 2022; 7:00 pm, ESPN+		Louisiana–Monroe	W 80–56	10–4 (1–1)	19 – Asberry	10 – Asberry	4 – 2 Tied	Strahan Arena (1,080); San Marcos, TX
January 15, 2022; 4:00 pm, ESPN+		Louisiana	W 72–68	11–4 (2–1)	22 – Asberry	6 – 2 Tied	4 – Drinnon	Strahan Arena (1,163); San Marcos, TX
January 20, 2022; 6:30 pm, ESPN+		at Little Rock	W 69–59	12–4 (3–1)	19 – Asberry	8 – Asberry	5 – Harrell	Jack Stephens Center (1,979); Little Rock, AR
January 22, 2022; 2:00 pm, ESPN+		at Arkansas State	L 60–67	12–5 (3–2)	17 – Small	10 – Small	2 – 2 Tied	First National Bank Arena (1,716); Jonesboro, AR
January 27, 2022; 7:00 pm, ESPN+		at UT Arlington	L 58–70	12–6 (3–3)	16 – Adams	8 – Small	6 – Harrell	College Park Center (1,658); Arlington, TX
January 29, 2022; 4:00 pm, ESPN+		UT Arlington	W 58–53	13–6 (4–3)	15 – Asberry	10 – Small	4 – Harrell	Strahan Arena (3,587); San Marcos, TX
February 3, 2022; 7:00 pm, ESPN+		Appalachian State	W 68–66	14–6 (5–3)	16 – Asberry	6 – 2 Tied	8 – Harrell	Strahan Arena (1,217); San Marcos, TX
February 5, 2022; 5:00 pm, ESPN+		Coastal Carolina	W 69–64	15–6 (6–3)	15 – Small	9 – Small	4 – Adams	Strahan Arena (2,638); San Marcos, TX
February 10, 2022; 7:00 pm, ESPN+		at Louisiana	W 82–73	16–6 (7–3)	20 – Harrell	7 – Small	5 – Harrell	Cajundome (2,609); Lafayette, LA
February 12, 2022; 2:00 pm, ESPN+		at Louisiana–Monroe	W 63–54	17–6 (8–3)	17 – Adams	7 – Harrell	3 – Small	Fant–Ewing Coliseum (1,720); Monroe, LA
February 17, 2022; 7:00 pm, ESPN+		Arkansas State	W 84–67	18–6 (9–3)	21 – Harrell	6 – Small	4 – Asberry	Strahan Arena (5,388); San Marcos, TX
February 19, 2022; 4:00 pm, ESPN+		Little Rock	W 68–50	19–6 (10–3)	19 – Harrell	8 – Ceasar	4 – Asberry	Strahan Arena (2,510); San Marcos, TX
February 23, 2022; 7:00 pm, ESPN+		at South Alabama	W 55–52	20–6 (11–3)	11 – 2 Tied	12 – Ceasar	3 – Harrell	Mitchell Center (1,847); Mobile, AL
February 25, 2022; 8:00 pm, ESPN2		at Troy	W 66–61	21–6 (12–3)	26 – Asberry	10 – Small	5 – Harrell	Trojan Arena (4,438); Troy, AL
Sun Belt tournament
March 5, 2022; 11:30 am, ESPN+	(1)	vs. (8) Louisiana; Quarterfinals	L 72–79	21–7	16 – Harrell	11 – Small	3 – Adams	Pensacola Bay Center (2,167); Pensacola, FL
NIT tournament
March 15, 2022*; 7:00 p.m., ESPN+		at (2) North Texas; First Round – Oklahoma Bracket	L 63–67 ^{OT}	21–8	14 – Ceaser	8 – Small	3 – 2 Tied	The Super Pit (3,386); Denton, TX
*Non-conference game. ^{#}Rankings from AP Poll. (#) Tournament seedings in parentheses. All times are in Central.
