= 2021–22 Appalachian State Mountaineers men's basketball team =

American college basketball season

2021–22 Appalachian State Mountaineers men's basketball

The Basketball Classic, first round
- Conference: Sun Belt Conference
- Record: 19–15 (12–6 Sun Belt)
- Head coach: Dustin Kerns (3rd season)
- Assistant coaches: Patrick Moynihan; Bob Szorc; Frank Young
- Home arena: Holmes Center

2021–22 Sun Belt Conference men's basketball standings
	Conf.				Overall
Team	W		L	PCT	W		L	PCT
Texas State	12	–	3	.800	21	–	8	.724
Appalachian State	12	–	6	.667	19	–	15	.559
Georgia State †	9	–	5	.643	18	–	11	.621
Troy	10	–	6	.625	20	–	12	.625
South Alabama	9	–	7	.563	21	–	12	.636
Arkansas State	8	–	7	.533	18	–	11	.621
Coastal Carolina	8	–	8	.500	19	–	14	.576
Louisiana	8	–	9	.471	16	–	15	.516
UT Arlington	7	–	10	.412	11	–	18	.379
Georgia Southern	5	–	11	.313	13	–	16	.448
Louisiana–Monroe	5	–	13	.278	13	–	18	.419
Little Rock	3	–	11	.214	9	–	19	.321
† 2022 Sun Belt Tournament winner

The 2021–22 Appalachian State Mountaineers men's basketball team represented Appalachian State University in the 2021–22 NCAA Division I men's basketball season. The Mountaineers, led by third-year head coach Dustin Kerns, played their home games at the Holmes Center in Boone, North Carolina as members in the Sun Belt Conference. They finished the season 19–15, 12–6 in Sun Belt play to finish in second place. They defeated Georgia Southern in the quarterfinals of the Sun Belt tournament before losing to Georgia State in the semifinals. The Mountaineers received an invitation to The Basketball Classic postseason tournament, formerly known as the CollegeInsider.com Tournament. There they lost in the first round to USC Upstate.

== Previous season ==
In a season limited due to the ongoing COVID-19 pandemic, the Mountaineers finished the 2020–21 season 17–12, 7–8 in Sun Belt play to finish in fourth place in the West Division. In the Sun Belt tournament, they defeated Little Rock in the first round, Texas State in the quarterfinals, and Coastal Carolina in the semifinals to advance to the championship game. In the championship game, they defeated Georgia State, sending the Mountaineers to their third ever NCAA tournament appearance, and their first since 2000. In the NCAA tournament, they received the #16 seed in the West Region, matching up with fellow #16 seed Norfolk State in the First Four, narrowly losing the game by a point, 53–54.

== Roster ==
2021–22 Appalachian State Mountaineers men's basketball team
Players
Coaches

Pos.	#	Name	Height	Weight	Year	Hometown
G	0	Xavion Brown	6 ft 3 in (1.91 m)	180 lb (82 kg)	So	Sacramento, CA
G	1	Justin Forrest	6 ft 2 in (1.88 m)	195 lb (88 kg)	Sr	Decatur, GA
F	2	Christopher Mantis	6 ft 7 in (2.01 m)	185 lb (84 kg)	Fr	Lowell, IN
F	4	R. J. Duhart	6 ft 9 in (2.06 m)	205 lb (93 kg)	Jr	Boynton Beach, FL
G	5	Michael Almonacy	6 ft 0 in (1.83 m)	180 lb (82 kg)	GS	Brentwood, NY
G	10	Michael Eads Jr.	6 ft 4 in (1.93 m)	200 lb (91 kg)	So	Orlando, FL
F	11	Donovan Gregory	6 ft 5 in (1.96 m)	190 lb (86 kg)	Jr	Charlotte, NC
G	12	Andrew Muse	6 ft 2 in (1.88 m)	180 lb (82 kg)	Jr	Winston-Salem, NC
G	14	Bryant Greene	6 ft 1 in (1.85 m)	175 lb (79 kg)	Jr	Boone, NC
F	15	C. J. Huntley	6 ft 10 in (2.08 m)	190 lb (86 kg)	So	Huntersville, NC
G	20	Adrian Delph	6 ft 3 in (1.91 m)	185 lb (84 kg)	Sr	Gastonia, NC
G	23	Terence Harcum	6 ft 3 in (1.91 m)	190 lb (86 kg)	Fr	Butner, NC
G	24	Michael Moore	6 ft 5 in (1.96 m)	200 lb (91 kg)	Fr	Bear Creek, NC
F	25	James Lewis Jr.	6 ft 8 in (2.03 m)	215 lb (98 kg)	Sr	Mount Holly, NC
C	33	Sasha Glushkov	6 ft 11 in (2.11 m)	205 lb (93 kg)	So	Vladivostok, Russia

Head coach

- Dustin Kerns (Clemson)

Assistant coach(es)

- Patrick Moynihan (North Georgia)
- Bob Szorc (St. John's)
- Frank Young (West Virginia)

Legend

- (C) Team captain
- (S) Suspended
- (I) Ineligible
- (W) Walk-on
- Injured
- Current redshirt

Roster
Last update: December 25, 2021

== Schedule and results ==
Date time, TV	Rank^{#}	Opponent^{#}	Result	Record	High points	High rebounds	High assists	Site (attendance) city, state
Non-conference regular season
November 9, 2021*; 7:00 pm, ESPN3		at Iona	L 53–65	0–1	15 – Delph	9 – Lewis Jr.	3 – Brown	Hynes Athletic Center (2,319); New Rochelle, NY
November 12, 2021*; 6:30 pm, ESPN+		East Tennessee State	W 69–67	1–1	19 – Delph	8 – Lewis Jr.	5 – Forrest	Holmes Center (3,401); Boone, NC
November 15, 2021*; 6:30 pm, ESPN+		William Peace	W 98–49	2–1	15 – Lewis Jr.	9 – Gregory	5 – Brown	Holmes Center (1,467); Boone, NC
November 18, 2021*; 6:30 pm, ESPN+		Charlotte	L 66–67	2–2	17 – Forrest	9 – Delph	4 – Almonacy	Holmes Center (3,234); Boone, NC
November 22, 2021*; 7:30 pm, FloHoops		vs. Delaware; Gulf Coast Showcase First Round	L 68–75	2–3	39 – Delph	6 – Duhart	3 – Almonacy	Hertz Arena (386); Estero, FL
November 23, 2021*; 1:30 pm, FloHoops		vs. Akron; Gulf Coast Showcase Consolation 2nd Round	W 57–45	3–3	18 – Almonacy	6 – 2 Tied	3 – Almonacy	Hertz Arena (401); Estero, FL
November 24, 2021*; 1:30 pm, FloHoops		vs. Vermont; Gulf Coast Showcase 5th place game	L 63–65	3–4	22 – Delph	6 – Gregory	3 – Gregory	Hertz Arena (213); Estero, FL
November 29, 2021*; 6:30 pm, ESPN+		Hartford	W 69–59	4–4	20 – Eads Jr.	7 – Huntley	4 – Forrest	Holmes Center (1,259); Boone, NC
December 1, 2021*; 7:30 pm, ESPN+		Boyce	W 90–29	5–4	11 – Almonacy	10 – Eads Jr.	5 – 2 Tied	Holmes Center (2,549); Boone, NC
December 10, 2021*; 7:00 pm, ESPN+		at Furman	L 65–73	5–5	17 – 2 Tied	10 – Delph	4 – Gregory	Timmons Arena (1,978); Greenville, SC
December 13, 2021*; 6:30 pm, ESPN+		Erskine	W 69–44	6–5	16 – Gregory	6 – Lewis Jr.	2 – 4 Tied	Holmes Center (1,037); Boone, NC
December 16, 2021*; 7:00 pm, ESPN2		at No. 2 Duke	L 67–92	6–6	17 – Almonacy	9 – Gregory	6 – Delph	Cameron Indoor Stadium (9,314); Durham, NC
December 21, 2021*; 7:00 pm, ACCN		at North Carolina	L 50–70	6–7	18 – Gregory	9 – Gregory	3 – Almonacy	Dean Smith Center (19,386); Chapel Hill, NC
Sun Belt Conference regular season
December 30, 2021; 6:30 pm, ESPN+		Louisiana	L 55–71	6–8 (0–1)	17 – Delph	8 – Lewis Jr.	6 – Almonacy	Holmes Center (2,535); Boone, NC
January 1, 2022; 4:00 pm, ESPN+		Louisiana–Monroe	W 77–69	7–8 (1–1)	29 – Delph	10 – Lewis Jr.	10 – Almonacy	Holmes Center (2,048); Boone, NC
January 6, 2022; 8:00 pm, ESPN+		at South Alabama	W 72–64	8–8 (2–1)	20 – Huntley	7 – Lewis Jr.	6 – Almonacy	Mitchell Center (1,520); Mobile, AL
January 8, 2022; 5:00 pm, ESPN+		at Troy	L 53–68	8–9 (2–2)	16 – Delph	9 – Huntley	4 – Almonacy	Trojan Arena (2,258); Troy, AL
January 13, 2022; 6:30 pm, ESPN+		Coastal Carolina	W 61–60	9–9 (3–2)	16 – Delph	11 – Huntley	3 – 2 Tied	Holmes Center (3,008); Boone, NC
January 15, 2022; 2:00 pm, ESPN+		at Coastal Carolina	W 84–76 ^{OT}	10–9 (4–2)	25 – Delph	14 – Lewis Jr.	4 – 2 Tied	HTC Center (1,267); Conway, SC
January 20, 2022; 7:00 pm, ESPN+		at Georgia State	W 61–60	11–9 (5–2)	29 – Delph	5 – Gregory	6 – Gregory	GSU Sports Arena (1,196); Atlanta, GA
January 22, 2022; 3:00 pm, ESPN+		at Georgia Southern	W 70–62	12–9 (6–2)	24 – Delph	4 – Almonacy	5 – Almonacy	Hanner Fieldhouse (2,241); Statesboro, GA
January 27, 2022; 6:30 pm, ESPN+		Arkansas State	W 61–54	13–9 (7–2)	13 – 2 Tied	9 – Gregory	5 – Forrest	Holmes Center (3,045); Boone, NC
January 29, 2022; 4:00 pm, ESPN+		Little Rock	W 72–57	14–9 (8–2)	23 – Gregory	9 – 2 Tied	2 – 3 Tied	Holmes Center (3,206); Boone, NC
February 3, 2022; 8:00 pm, ESPN+		at Texas State	L 66–68	14–10 (8–3)	22 – Delph	9 – Lewis Jr.	3 – Delph	Strahan Arena (1,217); San Marcos, TX
February 5, 2022; 6:00 pm, ESPN+		at UT Arlington	W 70–61	15–10 (9–3)	19 – Huntley	10 – Delph	5 – Gregory	College Park Center (2,075); Arlington, TX
February 10, 2022; 6:30 pm, ESPN+		Georgia Southern	W 65–61	16–10 (10–3)	19 – Delph	11 – Delph	4 – Forrest	Holmes Center (3,152); Boone, NC
February 12, 2022; 4:00 pm, ESPN+		Georgia State	L 49–58	16–11 (10–4)	12 – Delph	8 – Almonacy	2 – Tied	Holmes Center (3,008); Boone, NC
February 17, 2022; 6:30 pm, ESPN+		Troy	L 61–67	16–12 (10–5)	17 – Gregory	9 – Lewis Jr.	5 – Gregory	Holmes Center (3,017); Boone, NC
February 19, 2022; 4:30 pm, ESPN+		South Alabama	W 69–51	17–12 (11–5)	20 – Delph	9 – Lewis Jr.	10 – Gregory	Holmes Center (4,508); Boone, NC
February 23, 2022; 7:30 pm, ESPN+		at Little Rock	W 78–66	18–12 (12–5)	26 – Almonacy	8 – Delph	7 – Gregory	Jack Stephens Center (1,875); Little Rock, AR
February 25, 2022; 8:00 pm, ESPN+		at Arkansas State	L 60–62	18–13 (12–6)	19 – Delph	7 – Delph	3 – Gregory	First National Bank Arena (2,967); Jonesboro, AR
Sun Belt tournament
March 5, 2022; 7:30 pm, ESPN+	(2)	vs. (10) Georgia Southern; Quarterfinals	W 73–60	19–13	20 – Forrest	9 – Gregory	3 – Gregory	Pensacola Bay Center (1,177); Pensacola, FL
March 5, 2022; 8:30 pm, ESPN+	(2)	vs. (3) Georgia State; Semifinals	L 66–71	19–14	25 – Delph	9 – Duhart	5 – Gregory	Pensacola Bay Center (1,289); Pensacola, FL
The Basketball Classic
March 15, 2022*; 6:30 pm, ESPN+		USC Upstate; First Round	L 74–80	19–15	28 – Delph	10 – Gregory	4 – Gregory	Holmes Center; Boone, NC
*Non-conference game. ^{#}Rankings from AP Poll. (#) Tournament seedings in parentheses. All times are in Eastern.
