= 2022 Sun Belt Conference men's basketball tournament =

American college basketball postseason tournament

- Classification: Division I
- Season: 2021–22
- Teams: 12
- Site: Pensacola Bay Center; Pensacola, Florida
- Champions: Georgia State (4th title)
- Winning coach: Rob Lanier (1st title)
- Television: ESPN+, ESPN2

2021–22 Sun Belt Conference men's basketball standings
	Conf.				Overall
Team	W		L	PCT	W		L	PCT
Texas State	12	–	3	.800	21	–	8	.724
Appalachian State	12	–	6	.667	19	–	15	.559
Georgia State †	9	–	5	.643	18	–	11	.621
Troy	10	–	6	.625	20	–	12	.625
South Alabama	9	–	7	.563	21	–	12	.636
Arkansas State	8	–	7	.533	18	–	11	.621
Coastal Carolina	8	–	8	.500	19	–	14	.576
Louisiana	8	–	9	.471	16	–	15	.516
UT Arlington	7	–	10	.412	11	–	18	.379
Georgia Southern	5	–	11	.313	13	–	16	.448
Louisiana–Monroe	5	–	13	.278	13	–	18	.419
Little Rock	3	–	11	.214	9	–	19	.321
† 2022 Sun Belt Tournament winner

The 2022 Sun Belt Conference men's basketball tournament was the postseason men's basketball tournament for Sun Belt Conference during the 2021–22 NCAA Division I men's basketball season. All tournament games were played at Pensacola Bay Center in Florida during March 3–7, 2022. The winner, Georgia State, received the conference's automatic bid to the 2022 NCAA tournament.

== Seeds ==
All 12 conference teams qualified for the tournament. The top four teams received a bye into the quarterfinals.

Seed	School	Conference	NET ranking (March 2, 2021)
1	Texas State	12–3	119th
2	Appalachian State	12–6	158th
3	Georgia State	9–5	177th
4	Troy	10–6	175th
5	South Alabama	9–7	132nd
6	Arkansas State	8–7	171st
7	Coastal Carolina	8–8	146th
8	Louisiana	8–9	195th
9	UT Arlington	7–10	233rd
10	Georgia Southern	5–11	248th
11	Louisiana–Monroe	5–13	278th
12	Little Rock	3–11	325th

== Schedule ==
Game	Time	Matchup	Score	Television
First round – Thursday, March 3 – Pensacola Bay Center, Pensacola, FL
1	11:30 am	No. 8 Louisiana vs. No. 9 UT Arlington	67–64	ESPN+
2	2:00 pm	No. 5 South Alabama vs. No. 12 Little Rock	71–75	ESPN+
3	5:00 pm	No. 6 Arkansas State vs. No. 11 Louisiana–Monroe	81–77	ESPN+
4	7:30 pm	No. 7 Coastal Carolina vs. No. 10 Georgia Southern	64–70	ESPN+
Quarterfinals – Saturday, March 5 – Pensacola Bay Center, Pensacola, FL
5	11:30 am	No. 1 Texas State vs. No. 8 Louisiana	72–79	ESPN+
6	2:00 pm	No. 4 Troy vs. No. 12 Little Rock	69–62	ESPN+
7	5:00 pm	No. 3 Georgia State vs. No. 6 Arkansas State	65–62	ESPN+
8	7:30 pm	No. 2 Appalachian State vs. No. 10 Georgia Southern	73–60	ESPN+
Semifinals – Sunday, March 6 – Pensacola Bay Center, Pensacola, FL
9	5:00 pm	No. 8 Louisiana vs. No. 4 Troy	66–57	ESPN+
10	7:30 pm	No. 3 Georgia State vs. No. 2 Appalachian State	71–66	ESPN+
Championship – Monday, March 7 – Pensacola Bay Center, Pensacola, FL
11	6:00 pm	No. 8 Louisiana vs. No. 3 Georgia State	71–80	ESPN2
Game times in CT. Rankings denote tournament seed

== Bracket ==
First Round; Thursday, March 3rd, 2022; ESPN+
8	Louisiana	67
9	UT Arlington	64
5	South Alabama	71
12	Little Rock	75
6	Arkansas State	81
11	Louisiana–Monroe	77
7	Coastal Carolina	64
10	Georgia Southern	70

Quarterfinals; Saturday, March 5th, 2022; ESPN+
1	Texas State	72
8	Louisiana	79
4	Troy	69
12	Little Rock	62
3	Georgia State	65
6	Arkansas State	62
2	Appalachian State	73
10	Georgia Southern	60

Semifinals; Sunday, March 6th, 2022; ESPN+
8	Louisiana	66
4	Troy	57
3	Georgia State	71
2	Appalachian State	66

Championship; Monday, March 7th, 2022; ESPN2
8	Louisiana	71
3	Georgia State	80

== See also ==
2022 Sun Belt Conference women's basketball tournament
