= Brian Burg =

American basketball player and coach

Current position
- Title: Assistant Coach
- Team: Ole Miss
- Conference: SEC

Biographical details
- Born: February 4, 1980 (age 46)

Playing career
- 2001–2003: Mount Mercy University

Coaching career (HC unless noted)
- 2003–2005: Lake Erie College (graduate assistant)
- 2005–2006: Garden City CC (assistant)
- 2006–2007: Western Texas College (assistant)
- 2009–2013: Campbell (assistant)
- 2013–2015: North Carolina Central (assistant)
- 2015–2016: Little Rock (assistant)
- 2018–2020: Texas Tech (assistant)
- 2020–2023: Georgia Southern
- 2023–2024: Ole Miss (analyst)
- 2024–2026: Ole Miss (assistant)
- 2026–present: Ole Miss (General Manager)

Administrative career (AD unless noted)
- 2007–2009: Middle Tennessee State (director of basketball operations)
- 2016–2018: Texas Tech (chief of staff)

Head coaching record
- Overall: 42–44 (.488)

Brian Adam Burg (born February 4, 1980) is an American basketball coach who most recently served as head coach of the Georgia Southern Eagles men's basketball team.

== Early life and education ==
Burg is a native of Katy, Texas and is the son of Jim Burg. He played basketball at Cisco College before transferring to Mount Mercy University. When he was in college, Burg wrote letters to Bob Knight to try to find a coaching job. Burg graduated from Mount Mercy in 2003. He earned his master's degree from Lake Erie College in 2005.

== Coaching career ==
Burg began his coaching career as a graduate assistant at Lake Erie College from 2003 to 2005. He was an assistant coach at Garden City Community College from 2005 to 2006 and at Western Texas College from 2006 to 2007. Between 2007 and 2009 Burg served as the Director of Basketball Operations under Kermit Davis at Middle Tennessee State and was responsible for overseeing student-athlete academics, video editing and community. In 2009, Burg became an assistant coach at Campbell. He helped the team win the 2010 Atlantic Sun Conference regular season title and was the lead recruiter for Eric Griffin, the program's first NBA player. Burg served as an assistant at North Carolina Central from 2013 to 2015 and helped the team go to the 2014 NCAA Tournament and 2015 NIT. In 2015, Burg joined Little Rock as an assistant under Chris Beard and helped the team finish 30-5 and win a game in the NCAA Tournament. Burg followed Beard to Texas Tech in 2016 where he became the chief of staff. Burg became an assistant at Texas Tech in 2018 and led the team to the 2019 NCAA Tournament Championship Game.

On March 29, 2020, Burg was hired as the head coach at Georgia Southern. He replaces Mark Byington, who left to take the job at James Madison, and is athletic director Jared Benko's first hire.

== Head coaching record ==
Record table
Season	Team	Overall	Conference	Standing	Postseason
Georgia Southern (Sun Belt) (2020–2023)
2020–21	Georgia Southern	13–13	7–9	5th (East)	
2021–22	Georgia Southern	12–15	5–11	10th	
2022–23	Georgia Southern	17–16	9–9	T–7th	
Georgia Southern:		42–44 (.488)	21–29 (.420)		
Total:		42–44 (.488)			
National champion Postseason invitational champion Conference regular season champion Conference regular season and conference tournament champion Division regular season champion Division regular season and conference tournament champion Conference tournament champion
