= 2021–22 Georgia Southern Eagles men's basketball team =

American college basketball season

2021–22 Georgia Southern Eagles men's basketball
- Conference: Sun Belt Conference
- Record: 13–16 (5–11 Sun Belt)
- Head coach: Brian Burg (2nd season)
- Associate head coach: Chris Shumate
- Assistant coach: Tim MacAllister
- Home arena: Hanner Fieldhouse

2021–22 Sun Belt Conference men's basketball standings
	Conf.				Overall
Team	W		L	PCT	W		L	PCT
Texas State	12	–	3	.800	21	–	8	.724
Appalachian State	12	–	6	.667	19	–	15	.559
Georgia State †	9	–	5	.643	18	–	11	.621
Troy	10	–	6	.625	20	–	12	.625
South Alabama	9	–	7	.563	21	–	12	.636
Arkansas State	8	–	7	.533	18	–	11	.621
Coastal Carolina	8	–	8	.500	19	–	14	.576
Louisiana	8	–	9	.471	16	–	15	.516
UT Arlington	7	–	10	.412	11	–	18	.379
Georgia Southern	5	–	11	.313	13	–	16	.448
Louisiana–Monroe	5	–	13	.278	13	–	18	.419
Little Rock	3	–	11	.214	9	–	19	.321
† 2022 Sun Belt Tournament winner

The 2021–22 Georgia Southern Eagles men's basketball team represented Georgia Southern University in the 2021–22 NCAA Division I men's basketball season. The Eagles, led by second-year head coach Brian Burg, played their home games at Hanner Fieldhouse in Statesboro, Georgia as members of the Sun Belt Conference.

== Previous season ==
The Eagles finished the 2020–21 season 13–13, 7–9 in Sun Belt play to finish in fifth place in the East Division. They were defeated by Arkansas State in the first round of the Sun Belt tournament.

== Offseason ==
=== Departures ===
Name	Number	Pos.	Height	Weight	Year	Hometown	Notes
David Viti	1	F/G	6'5"	215	Redshirt Sophomore	Buford, Georgia	Transfer to Augusta
Zach Bryant	3	G	6'2"	200	Senior	Hastings, Florida	Graduated and playing professionally in Basketball Bundesliga
Eric Boone	5	G	6'2"	190	Junior	Lexington, Kentucky	Transfer to North Carolina Central
Eito Yuminami	21	G	5'6"	160	Junior	Mooresville, North Carolina	Graduated and playing professionally in the B.League
JeMar Lincoln	33	G	6'1"	200	Redshirt Junior	Waycross, Georgia	Released/Quit
Jacob Sowers	34	G	6'0"	185	Senior	Alpharetta, Georgia	Graduated
Fred Odhiambo	44	C	6'11"	210	Junior	Nairobi, Kenya	Transfer to Clayton State

=== Transfers ===
Name	Number	Pos.	Height	Weight	Year	Hometown	Old School
Tre Cobbs	3	G	6'0"	190	Senior	Lima, Ohio	Kentucky Wesleyan
Carlos Curry	25	F	6'11"	240	Redshirt Junior	Albany, Georgia	Northwest Mississippi CC

=== Recruiting ===
College recruiting
Name	Hometown	School	Height	Weight	Commit date
Mannie Harris; Guard	Camilla, GA	Mitchell County HS	6 ft 3 in (1.91 m)	180 lb (82 kg)	Nov 17, 2020
Mannie Harris; Guard	Recruit ratings: No ratings found				
Donovan Stocks; Guard	Cincinnati, OH	Covington Catholic HS	6 ft 3 in (1.91 m)	185 lb (84 kg)	Jun 15, 2021
Donovan Stocks; Guard	Recruit ratings: No ratings found				
Amar Augillard; Guard	Zion, IL	Zion Benton HS	6 ft 4 in (1.93 m)	210 lb (95 kg)	Aug 14, 2021
Amar Augillard; Guard	Recruit ratings: No ratings found				
Overall recruit ranking:
Note: In many cases, Scout, Rivals, 247Sports, On3, and ESPN may conflict in their listings of height and weight.; In these cases, the average was taken. ESPN grades are on a 100-point scale.; Sources: "Georgia Southern 2021-22 Basketball Commits". ESPN.; "2021-22 Team Ranking". Rivals.

== Roster ==
2021–22 Georgia Southern Eagles men's basketball team
Players
Coaches

Pos.	#	Name	Height	Weight	Year	Hometown
G/F	0	Kaden Archie	6 ft 6 in (1.98 m)	205 lb (93 kg)	Sr	Dallas, Texas
G/F	1	Cam Bryant	6 ft 7 in (2.01 m)	215 lb (98 kg)	So	Camilla, Georgia
G	2	Elijah McCadden	6 ft 4 in (1.93 m)	205 lb (93 kg)	Sr	Rocky Mount, North Carolina
G	3	Tre Cobbs	6 ft 0 in (1.83 m)	190 lb (86 kg)	RS Sr	Lima, Ohio
G	4	Kamari Brown	6 ft 3 in (1.91 m)	190 lb (86 kg)	Sr	Tallahassee, Florida
G	5	Mannie Harris	6 ft 3 in (1.91 m)	180 lb (82 kg)	Fr	Camilla, Georgia
F	10	Carlos Curry	6 ft 11 in (2.11 m)	240 lb (109 kg)	RS Jr	Albany, Georgia
F	11	Mackenzie McFatten	6 ft 8 in (2.03 m)	210 lb (95 kg)	RS So	Douglas, Georgia
F	12	Andrei Savrasov	6 ft 7 in (2.01 m)	225 lb (102 kg)	RS Jr	St. Petersburg, Russia
G/F	13	Gedi Juozapaitis	6 ft 4 in (1.93 m)	210 lb (95 kg)	Sr	London, England
G	14	Donovan Stocks	6 ft 3 in (1.91 m)	185 lb (84 kg)	Fr	Cincinnati, Ohio
G	21	Amar Augillard	6 ft 4 in (1.93 m)	210 lb (95 kg)	Fr	Zion, Illinois
G	23	Grant Weatherford	6 ft 2 in (1.88 m)	195 lb (88 kg)	RS Sr	Cicero, Indiana
F/C	24	Prince Toyambi	6 ft 7 in (2.01 m)	230 lb (104 kg)	RS Jr	Kinshasa, DR Congo
G		Will Dillard	6 ft 3 in (1.91 m)	205 lb (93 kg)	RS Sr	Greensboro, North Carolina

Head coach

- Brian Burg (UNC Wilmington)

Assistant coach(es)

- Chris Shumate (Murray State)
- Tim MacAllister (Murray State)

Legend

- (C) Team captain
- (S) Suspended
- (I) Ineligible
- (W) Walk-on
- Injured
- Current redshirt

Roster
Last update: October 26, 2021

== Schedule and results ==
Date time, TV	Rank^{#}	Opponent^{#}	Result	Record	High points	High rebounds	High assists	Site (attendance) city, state
Non-conference regular season
November 9, 2021*; 7:00 pm, ESPN+		Ball State	W 82–71	1–0	15 – Juozapaitis	7 – Savrasov	4 – Brown	Hanner Fieldhouse (2,654); Statesboro, GA
November 13, 2021*; 12:00 pm, ESPN+		at South Florida	W 53–41	2–0	13 – McCadden	7 – Brown	3 – McCadden	Yuengling Center (2,259); Tampa, FL
November 16, 2021*; 7:00 pm, ESPN+		Bob Jones	W 103–51	3–0	18 – Savrasov	8 – Savrasov	5 – McCadden	Hanner Fieldhouse (2,364); Statesboro, GA
November 20, 2021*; 5:00 pm, ESPN+		vs. Hampton	W 86–66	4–0	16 – Savrasov	6 – Toyambi	6 – Cobbs	Jerry Richardson Indoor Stadium (70); Spartanburg, SC
November 21, 2021*; 5:00 pm, ESPN+		at Wofford	L 52–70	4–1	10 – Savrasov	6 – Toyambi	6 – Juozapaitis	Jerry Richardson Indoor Stadium (791); Spartanburg, SC
November 26, 2021*; 12:00 pm, ACCNX		at Georgia Tech	L 59–61	4–2	14 – 2 Tied	7 – 2 Tied	3 – 4 Tied	McCamish Pavilion (4,486); Atlanta, GA
December 1, 2021*; 7:00 pm, ESPN+		at Morehead State	L 51–59	4–3	17 – McCadden	7 – Toyambi	4 – 2 Tied	Ellis Johnson Arena (1,555); Morehead, KY
December 8, 2021*; 7:00 pm, ESPN+		Carver	W 85–43	5–3	22 – Savrasov	10 – Curry	6 – Bryant	Hanner Fieldhouse (1,106); Statesboro, GA
December 11, 2021*; 2:00 pm, ESPN+		at Mercer	L 68–77	5–4	14 – 2 Tied	9 – Brown	3 – McCadden	Hawkins Arena (2,322); Macon, GA
December 15, 2021*; 7:00 pm, ESPN+		at Campbell	W 69–66	6–4	17 – McCadden	8 – McCadden	3 – McCadden	Gore Arena (1,360); Buies Creek, NC
December 18, 2021*; 3:00 pm, ESPN+		Covenant	W 85–51	7–4	16 – 2 Tied	9 – Savrasov	4 – Bryant	Hanner Fieldhouse (1,025); Statesboro, GA
December 22, 2021*; 4:00 pm, ESPN+		at Fordham	Canceled due to COVID-19 protocols					Rose Hill Gymnasium; Bronx, NY
Sun Belt Conference regular season
December 30, 2021; 7:30 pm, ESPN+		at Little Rock	L 66–78	7–5 (0–1)	17 – Toyambi	8 – Toyambi	4 – McCadden	Jack Stephens Center (1,775); Little Rock, AR
January 1, 2022; 5:00 pm, ESPN+		at Arkansas State	L 56–74	7–6 (0–2)	13 – Savrasov	7 – Bryant	2 – Archie	First National Bank Arena (1,012); Jonesboro, AR
January 6, 2022; 7:00 pm, ESPN+		Texas State	Canceled due to COVID-19 protocols					Hanner Fieldhouse; Statesboro, GA
January 8, 2022; 3:00 pm, ESPN+		UT Arlington	W 74–73 ^{OT}	8–6 (1–2)	16 – Brown	8 – Bryant	5 – 2 Tied	Hanner Fieldhouse (1,822); Statesboro, GA
January 13, 2022; 7:00 pm, ESPN+		at Troy	Canceled due to COVID-19 protocols					Trojan Arena; Troy, AL
January 15, 2022; 5:00 pm, ESPN+		at South Alabama	L 67–73	8–7 (1–3)	19 – McCadden	11 – McCadden	4 – Juozapaitis	Mitchell Center (1,926); Mobile, AL
January 20, 2022; 7:00 pm, ESPN+		Coastal Carolina	L 72–76	8–8 (1–4)	20 – McCadden	8 – McCadden	4 – Archie	Hanner Fieldhouse (1,861); Statesboro, GA
January 22, 2022; 3:00 pm, ESPN+		Appalachian State	L 62–70	8–9 (1–5)	16 – Savrasov	12 – Toyambi	4 – Brown	Hanner Fieldhouse (2,241); Statesboro, GA
January 27, 2022; 7:30 pm, ESPN+		at Louisiana–Monroe	W 50–45	9–9 (2–5)	12 – Bryant	8 – 2 Tied	3 – Cobbs	Fant–Ewing Coliseum (2,968); Monroe, LA
January 29, 2022; 8:00 pm, ESPN+		at Louisiana	W 66–65	10–9 (3–5)	21 – McCadden	10 – Toyambi	4 – McCadden	Cajundome (3,023); Lafayette, LA
February 3, 2022; 7:00 pm, ESPN+		South Alabama	W 58–57	11–9 (4–5)	10 – 2 Tied	8 – Savrasov	4 – Archie	Hanner Fieldhouse (1,886); Statesboro, GA
February 5, 2022; 4:00 pm, ESPN+		Troy	L 52–61	11–10 (4–6)	13 – McCadden	7 – Curry	2 – 2 Tied	Hanner Fieldhouse (2,144); Statesboro, GA
February 10, 2022; 6:30 pm, ESPN+		at Appalachian State	L 61–65	11–11 (4–7)	13 – Savrasov	8 – Toyambi	5 – McCadden	Holmes Center (3,152); Boone, NC
February 12, 2022; 2:00 pm, ESPN+		at Coastal Carolina	L 58–79	11–12 (4–8)	14 – McCadden	10 – Toyambi	3 – McCadden	HTC Center (969); Conway, SC
February 17, 2022; 7:00 pm, ESPN+		at Georgia State; Modern Day Hate	L 63–79	11–13 (4–9)	17 – Brown	9 – Savrasov	2 – 4 Tied	GSU Sports Arena (3,339); Atlanta, GA
February 19, 2022; 3:00 pm, ESPN+		Georgia State; Modern Day Hate	L 49–58	11–14 (4–10)	21 – Savrasov	7 – Bryant	3 – 2 Tied	Hanner Fieldhouse (3,353); Statesboro, GA
February 23, 2022; 7:00 pm, ESPN+		Louisiana	L 69–82	11–15 (4–11)	16 – McFadden	8 – McFadden	4 – McFadden	Hanner Fieldhouse (1,669); Statesboro, GA
February 25, 2022; 7:00 pm, ESPN+		Louisiana–Monroe	W 81–75 ^{OT}	12–15 (5–11)	22 – Brown	8 – Savrasov	5 – McCadden	Hanner Fieldhouse (1,707); Statesboro, GA
Sun Belt tournament
March 3, 2022; 7:30 pm, ESPN+	(10)	vs. (7) Coastal Carolina; First round	W 70–64	13–15	15 – McCadden	8 – Brown	4 – McCadden	Pensacola Bay Center (723); Pensacola, FL
March 5, 2022; 7:30 pm, ESPN+	(10)	vs. (2) Appalachian State; Quarterfinals	L 60–73	13–16	17 – Archie	7 – McCadden	6 – McCadden	Pensacola Bay Center (1,177); Pensacola, FL
*Non-conference game. ^{#}Rankings from AP Poll. (#) Tournament seedings in parentheses. All times are in Eastern Time.
