= 2021–22 Little Rock Trojans men's basketball team =

American college basketball season

2021–22 Little Rock Trojans men's basketball
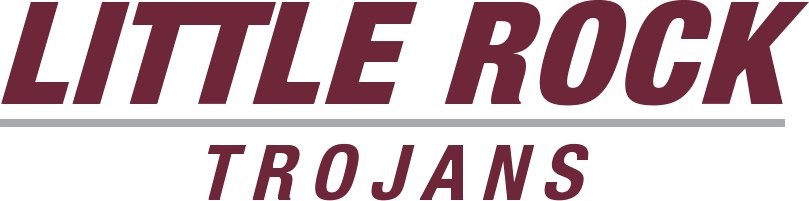
- Conference: Sun Belt Conference
- Record: 9–19 (3–11 Sun Belt)
- Head coach: Darrell Walker (4th season)
- Assistant coaches: Charles Baker; Preston Laird; Julius Hodge
- Home arena: Jack Stephens Center

2021–22 Sun Belt Conference men's basketball standings
	Conf.				Overall
Team	W		L	PCT	W		L	PCT
Texas State	12	–	3	.800	21	–	8	.724
Appalachian State	12	–	6	.667	19	–	15	.559
Georgia State †	9	–	5	.643	18	–	11	.621
Troy	10	–	6	.625	20	–	12	.625
South Alabama	9	–	7	.563	21	–	12	.636
Arkansas State	8	–	7	.533	18	–	11	.621
Coastal Carolina	8	–	8	.500	19	–	14	.576
Louisiana	8	–	9	.471	16	–	15	.516
UT Arlington	7	–	10	.412	11	–	18	.379
Georgia Southern	5	–	11	.313	13	–	16	.448
Louisiana–Monroe	5	–	13	.278	13	–	18	.419
Little Rock	3	–	11	.214	9	–	19	.321
† 2022 Sun Belt Tournament winner

The 2021–22 Little Rock Trojans men's basketball team represented the University of Arkansas at Little Rock in the 2021–22 NCAA Division I men's basketball season. The Trojans, led by fourth-year head coach Darrell Walker, played their home games at the Jack Stephens Center in Little Rock, Arkansas as members in the Sun Belt Conference. They finished the season 9–19, 3–11 in Sun Belt play to finish in last place. They defeated South Alabama in the first round of the Sun Belt tournament before losing to Troy in the quarterfinals.

On December 9, 2021, Little Rock announced that this was the last season for the team in the Sun Belt as they would join the Ohio Valley Conference on July 1, 2022.

== Previous season ==
In a season limited due to the ongoing COVID-19 pandemic, the Trojans finished the 2020–21 season 11–15, 7–11 in Sun Belt play to finish in fifth place in the West Division. In the Sun Belt tournament, they were defeated by Appalachian State in the first round.

== Roster ==
2021–22 Little Rock Trojans men's basketball team
Players
Coaches

Pos.	#	Name	Height	Weight	Year	Hometown
G	0	Chris Walker	6 ft 6 in (1.98 m)	185 lb (84 kg)	Fr	Wellington, FL
F	1	DeAntoni Gordon	6 ft 7 in (2.01 m)	210 lb (95 kg)	Jr	Mobile, AL
G	3	Isaiah Palermo	6 ft 5 in (1.96 m)	185 lb (84 kg)	Jr	Kissimmee, FL
G	5	CJ White	6 ft 5 in (1.96 m)	215 lb (98 kg)	Sr	Little Rock, AR
G	10	Marko Lukic	6 ft 7 in (2.01 m)	195 lb (88 kg)	Jr	Belgrade, Serbia
G	11	Marko Andric	6 ft 2 in (1.88 m)	180 lb (82 kg)	So	Belgrade, Serbia
G	12	Jordan Jefferson	6 ft 2 in (1.88 m)	165 lb (75 kg)	Fr	Marietta, GA
G	13	D.J. Smith	6 ft 0 in (1.83 m)	150 lb (68 kg)	Fr	North Little Rock, AR
F	15	Myron Gardner	6 ft 6 in (1.98 m)	220 lb (100 kg)	Jr	Detroit, MI
F	20	Kevin Osawe	6 ft 7 in (2.01 m)	210 lb (95 kg)	Jr	Toronto, Ontario, Canada
F	22	Ethan Speaker	6 ft 6 in (1.98 m)	200 lb (91 kg)	Fr	Boulder City, NV
F	25	Nikola Marić	6 ft 10 in (2.08 m)	250 lb (113 kg)	Sr	Trebinje, Bosnia–Herzegovina
G	33	Jovan Stulic	6 ft 5 in (1.96 m)	205 lb (93 kg)	Jr	Prigrevica, Serbia
C	52	Admir Besovic	7 ft 0 in (2.13 m)	250 lb (113 kg)	GS	Sarajevo, Bosnia–Herzegovina
G	55	Terrell Curtis II	5 ft 10 in (1.78 m)	165 lb (75 kg)	Sr	Maumelle, AR

Head coach

- Darrell Walker (Arkansas)

Assistant coach(es)

- Charles Baker (Eastern Kentucky)
- Preston Laird (Memphis)
- Julius Hodge (NC State)

Legend

- (C) Team captain
- (S) Suspended
- (I) Ineligible
- (W) Walk-on
- Injured
- Current redshirt

Roster
Last update: December 26, 2021

== Schedule and results ==
Date time, TV	Rank^{#}	Opponent^{#}	Result	Record	High points	High rebounds	High assists	Site (attendance) city, state
Non-conference regular season
November 9, 2021*; 5:00 pm, ESPN+		Southern Illinois	W 69–66	1–0	15 – Stulic	7 – Marić	7 – Marić	Jack Stephens Center; Little Rock, AR
November 12, 2021*; 6:30 pm, ESPN+		Champion Christian	W 115–51	2–0	30 – Palermo	10 – White	8 – Smith	Jack Stephens Center (1,113); Little Rock, AR
November 14, 2021*; 2:00 pm, ESPN+		Arkansas Baptist	W 91–60	3–0	20 – Osawe	11 – Maric	7 – White	Jack Stephens Center; Little Rock, AR
November 17, 2021*; 9:00 pm, WCC Network		at Loyola Marymount; Jacksonville Classic campus-site game	L 63–82	3–1	16 – Palermo	4 – 2 Tied	3 – 2 Tied	Gersten Pavilion (985); Los Angeles, CA
November 21, 2021*; 1:30 pm		vs. Sam Houston State; Jacksonville Classic Jax Bracket Semifinals	L 59–77	3–2	16 – Maric	5 – Osawe	5 – Andric	UNF Arena (745); Jacksonville, FL
November 22, 2021*; 10:00 am		vs. Northern Illinois; Jacksonville Classic Jax Bracket Consolation	W 67–60	4–2	16 – Gordon	9 – Gordon	2 – 7 Tied	UNF Arena (180); Jacksonville, FL
November 26, 2021*; 7:00 pm, ESPN+		at Tulsa	L 63–77	4–3	17 – Gordon	5 – Besovic	3 – 2 Tied	Reynolds Center (2,687); Tulsa, OK
December 1, 2021*; 8:00 pm, MWN		at Colorado State	L 55–86	4–4	16 – Palermo	6 – Osawe	3 – Smith	Moby Arena (4,147); Fort Collins, CO
December 4, 2021*; 3:00 pm, SECN		at No. 10 Arkansas	L 78–93	4–5	23 – Lukic	10 – Palermo	6 – 2 Tied	Bud Walton Arena (19,200); Fayetteville, AR
December 8, 2021*; 6:30 pm, ESPN+		Missouri State	L 55–81	4–6	15 – Lukic	7 – Palermo	5 – 2 Tied	Jack Stephens Center (1,057); Little Rock, AR
December 11, 2021*; 2:00 pm, ESPN+		Philander Smith	W 60–51	5–6	18 – Palermo	10 – Smith	5 – Palermo	Jack Stephens Center (1,252); Little Rock, AR
December 14, 2021*; 7:00 pm		at Central Arkansas; Governor's I-40 Showdown	Postponed					Farris Center; Conway, AR
December 21, 2021*; 2:00 pm, ESPN+		Jacksonville State	L 67–87	5–7	25 – Lukic	5 – Palermo	3 – 2 Tied	Jack Stephens Center (977); Little Rock, AR
Sun Belt Conference regular season
December 30, 2021; 6:30 pm, ESPN+		Georgia Southern	W 78–68	6–7 (1–0)	24 – Maric	8 – Maric	4 – Lukic	Jack Stephens Center (1,775); Little Rock, AR
January 1, 2022; 4:00 pm, ESPN+		Georgia State	Canceled due to COVID-19 issues					Jack Stephens Center; Little Rock, AR
January 6, 2022; 6:30 pm, ESPN+		at Louisiana–Monroe	L 72–80	6–8 (1–1)	24 – Maric	8 – White	8 – White	Fant–Ewing Coliseum (1,869); Monroe, LA
January 8, 2022; 7:05 pm, ESPN+		at Louisiana	Canceled due to COVID-19 issues					Cajundome; Lafayette, LA
January 13, 2022; 7:30 pm, ESPN+		at Arkansas State	Canceled due to COVID-19 issues					First National Bank Arena; Jonesboro, AR
January 15, 2022; 4:00 pm, ESPN+		Arkansas State	Canceled due to COVID-19 issues					Jack Stephens Center; Little Rock, AR
January 20, 2022; 6:30 pm, ESPN+		Texas State	L 59–69	6–9 (1–2)	13 – 2 Tied	5 – Gardner	4 – Smith	Jack Stephens Center (1,979); Little Rock, AR
January 22, 2022; 2:00 pm, ESPN+		UT Arlington	W 98–96 ^{3OT}	7–9 (2–2)	27 – Smith	5 – 2 Tied	7 – White	Jack Stephens Center (1,910); Little Rock, AR
January 27, 2022; 6:00 pm, ESPN+		at Coastal Carolina	L 49–65	7–10 (2–3)	18 – Jefferson	9 – Maric	2 – 3 Tied	HTC Center (1,122); Conway, SC
January 29, 2022; 3:00 pm, ESPN+		at Appalachian State	L 57–72	7–11 (2–4)	16 – Gardner	8 – Gardner	6 – Maric	Holmes Center (3,206); Boone, NC
February 3, 2022; 6:30 pm, ESPN+		Louisiana	L 51–75	7–12 (2–5)	14 – Jefferson	6 – Palermo	2 – Palermo	Jack Stephens Center (1,833); Little Rock, AR
February 5, 2022; 2:00 pm, ESPN+		Louisiana–Monroe	L 72–75 ^{OT}	7–13 (2–6)	19 – Palermo	9 – Palermo	5 – White	Jack Stephens Center (2,257); Little Rock, AR
February 10, 2022; 7:00 pm, ESPN+		at South Alabama	L 46–77	7–14 (2–7)	16 – Palermo	5 – Osawe	3 – Smith	Mitchell Center (1,727); Mobile, AL
February 12, 2022; 4:00 pm, ESPN+		at Troy	W 66–62	8–14 (3–7)	18 – Stulic	8 – Stulic	3 – Gardner	Trojan Arena (4,128); Troy, AL
February 17, 2022; 7:00 pm, ESPN+		at UT Arlington	L 70–85	8–15 (3–8)	24 – Gardner	11 – Gardner	8 – Smith	College Park Center (1,777); Arlington, TX
February 19, 2022; 4:00 pm, ESPN+		at Texas State	L 50–68	8–16 (3–9)	10 – 2 Tied	7 – 2 Tied	2 – 2 Tied	Strahan Arena (2,510); San Marcos, TX
February 23, 2022; 6:30 pm, ESPN+		Appalachian State	L 66–78	8–17 (3–10)	20 – White	16 – Gardner	10 – Gardner	Jack Stephens Center (1,875); Little Rock, AR
February 25, 2022; 6:30 pm, ESPN+		Coastal Carolina	L 55–68	8–18 (3–11)	14 – Besovic	9 – Jefferson	3 – Jefferson	Jack Stephens Center (2,285); Little Rock, AR
Sun Belt tournament
March 3, 2022; 2:00 pm, ESPN+	(12)	vs. (5) South Alabama; First round	W 75–71	9–18	24 – Jefferson	7 – Gardner	5 – White	Pensacola Bay Center (852); Pensacola, FL
March 5, 2022; 2:00 pm, ESPN+	(12)	vs. (4) Troy; Quarterfinals	L 62–69	9–19	18 – Maric	9 – Maric	4 – Maric	Pensacola Bay Center (2,313); Pensacola, FL
*Non-conference game. ^{#}Rankings from AP Poll. (#) Tournament seedings in parentheses. All times are in Central.
