= 2022–23 Louisiana Ragin' Cajuns men's basketball team =

American college basketball season

2022–23 Louisiana Ragin' Cajuns men's basketball

Sun Belt tournament champions Asheville Championship champions

NCAA tournament, First Round
- Conference: Sun Belt Conference
- Record: 26–8 (13–5 Sun Belt)
- Head coach: Bob Marlin (13th season)
- Assistant coaches: Derrick Zimmerman; Donovan Kates; Casey Perrin
- Home arena: Cajundome

2022–23 Sun Belt Conference men's basketball standings
	Conf.				Overall
Team	W		L	PCT	W		L	PCT
Southern Miss	14	–	4	.778	25	–	8	.758
Louisiana †	13	–	5	.722	26	–	8	.765
Marshall	13	–	5	.722	24	–	8	.750
James Madison	12	–	6	.667	22	–	11	.667
Troy	11	–	7	.611	20	–	13	.606
Old Dominion	11	–	7	.611	19	–	12	.613
Georgia Southern	9	–	9	.500	17	–	16	.515
South Alabama	9	–	9	.500	19	–	16	.543
Appalachian State	9	–	9	.500	16	–	16	.500
Louisiana–Monroe	7	–	11	.389	11	–	21	.344
Texas State	6	–	12	.333	16	–	19	.457
Coastal Carolina	5	–	13	.278	11	–	20	.355
Arkansas State	4	–	14	.222	13	–	20	.394
Georgia State	3	–	15	.167	10	–	21	.323
† 2023 Sun Belt Tournament winner

The 2022–23 Louisiana Ragin' Cajuns men's basketball team represented the University of Louisiana at Lafayette during the 2022–23 NCAA Division I men's basketball season. The Ragin' Cajuns, led by 13th-year head coach Bob Marlin, played their home games at the Cajundome as members of the Sun Belt Conference. They finished the season 26–8, 13–5 in Sun Belt play to finish in a tie for second place. As the No. 2 seed in the Sun Belt tournament, they defeated Georgia Southern, Texas State, and South Alabama to win the tournament championship. As a result, they received the conference's automatic bid to the NCAA tournament as the No. 13 seed in the East region. Then they lost to Tennessee in the first round.

== Previous season ==
The Ragin' Cajuns finished the 2021–22 season 16–15, 8–9 in Sun Belt play to finish in eighth place. They defeated UT Arlington, Texas State, and Troy to advance to the Sun Belt tournament championship where they lost to Georgia State.

== Offseason ==
=== Departures ===
Name	Number	Pos.	Height	Weight	Year	Hometown	Reason for departure
Trajan Wesley	3	G	5'9"	165	Junior	Navasota, TX	Transferred to Prairie View A&M
Theo Akwuba	10	F	6'11"	225	Junior	Montgomery, AL	Transferred to Ole Miss
Durey Cadwell	11	G	6'5"	185	Sophomore	Houston, TX	Left the team for personal reasons
Dou Gueye	23	F	6'9"	220	Senior	Dakar, Senegal	Graduated
Antwann Jones	25	G	6'6"	220	RS Sophomore	Orlando, FL	Left the team for personal reasons
Carter Domingue	40	G	6'2"	205	Freshman	Lafayette, LA	Walk-on; left the team for personal reasons
Brayan Au	41	G	6'4"	190	Junior	Nuevo Casas Grandes, Mexico	Left the team for personal reasons
Ty Harper	55	G	6'3"	175	Freshman	Norcross, GA	Transferred to Eastern Washington

=== Transfers ===
Name	Number	Pos.	Height	Weight	Year	Hometown	Previous School
Themus Fulks	0	G	6'1"	175	RS Sophomore	Winston-Salem, NC	Dodge City CC
Terence Lewis II	34	G	6'6"	205	Senior	Upper Marlboro, MD	Jackson State

=== Recruiting class ===
College recruiting information
Name	Hometown	School	Height	Weight	Commit date
Chancellor White; SG	Richmond, TX	Foster High School	6 ft 6 in (1.98 m)	185 lb (84 kg)	Sep 16, 2021
Chancellor White; SG	Recruit ratings: No ratings found				
Vincent Sigona; PG	Plano, TX	Prestonwood Christian Academy	6 ft 1 in (1.85 m)	160 lb (73 kg)	
Vincent Sigona; PG	Recruit ratings: No ratings found				
Kyran Ratliff; PF	New Orleans, LA	Booker T. Washington High School	6 ft 8 in (2.03 m)	190 lb (86 kg)	
Kyran Ratliff; PF	Recruit ratings: 247Sports:				
Overall recruit ranking:
Note: In many cases, Scout, Rivals, 247Sports, On3, and ESPN may conflict in their listings of height and weight.; In these cases, the average was taken. ESPN grades are on a 100-point scale.; Sources: "Louisiana 2022-23 Basketball Commits". ESPN.; "2022-23 Team Ranking". Rivals.

== Preseason ==
=== Preseason Sun Belt Conference poll ===
The Ragin' Cajuns were picked to win the conference in the conference's preseason poll; they received 10 of 14 first-place votes. Junior forward Jordan Brown was named the preseason player of the year. Sophomore forward Kobe Julien was named to the preseason All-SBC Second Team.

Coaches poll
Predicted finish	Team (1st place Votes)
1	Louisiana - 190 (10)
2	Texas State - 162 (1)
3	South Alabama - 150 (1)
4	James Madison - 149 (1)
5	Georgia State - 127 (1)
6	Marshall - 122
7	App State - 120
8	Coastal Carolina - 100
9	Old Dominion - 93
10	Troy - 76
11	Georgia Southern - 69
12	Arkansas State - 48
13	Southern Miss - 34
14	ULM - 30

== Roster ==
2022–23 Louisiana Ragin' Cajuns men's basketball team
Players
Coaches

Pos.	#	Name	Height	Weight	Year	Previous school	Hometown
G	0	Themus Fulks	6 ft 1 in (1.85 m)	175 lb (79 kg)	RS So	North Davidson HS; Dodge CC	Winston-Salem, North Carolina
F	1	Joe Charles	6 ft 7 in (2.01 m)	195 lb (88 kg)	So	Carencro HS	Carencro, Louisiana
G	2	Michael Thomas	6 ft 1 in (1.85 m)	160 lb (73 kg)	So	Hamilton Christian	Lake Charles, Louisiana
G	3	Chancellor White	6 ft 6 in (1.98 m)	185 lb (84 kg)	Fr	Foster HS	Richmond, Texas
F	4	Kobe Julien	6 ft 6 in (1.98 m)	215 lb (98 kg)	RS So	Madison Preparatory	Baton Rouge, Louisiana
G	5	Jalen Dalcourt	6 ft 1 in (1.85 m)	160 lb (73 kg)	Sr	Lafayette HS; San Jose State	Lafayette, Louisiana
G	11	Isaiah Crawford (W)	6 ft 3 in (1.91 m)	175 lb (79 kg)	Fr	Archbishop Shaw HS	New Orleans, Louisiana
G	13	Greg Williams, Jr.	6 ft 3 in (1.91 m)	205 lb (93 kg)	Sr	Lafayette Christian; St. John's	Lafayette, Louisiana
F	21	Jordan Brown	6 ft 11 in (2.11 m)	225 lb (102 kg)	Jr	Prolific Preparatory; Arizona	Roseville, California
G	22	Kentrell Garnett	6 ft 1 in (1.85 m)	165 lb (75 kg)	So	Catholic HS	Donaldsonville, Louisiana
F	23	Kyran Ratliff	6 ft 8 in (2.03 m)	205 lb (93 kg)	Fr	Booker T. Washington HS; Shaun Dumas Academy	New Orleans, Louisiana
G	30	Vinny Sigona	6 ft 1 in (1.85 m)	165 lb (75 kg)	Fr	Prestonwood Christian Academy	Plano, Texas
F	34	Terence Lewis II	6 ft 7 in (2.01 m)	215 lb (98 kg)	Sr	Combine Academy; Jackson State; North Texas	Upper Marlboro, Maryland
F	35	Isaiah Richards	6 ft 10 in (2.08 m)	225 lb (102 kg)	So	South Shore HS; Springfield Commonwealth	Brooklyn, New York

Head coach

- Bob Marlin (Mississippi State)

Assistant coach(es)

- Derrick Zimmerman (Mississippi State)
- Donovan Kates (Manhattan)
- Casey Perrin (Campbell)

Legend

- (C) Team captain
- (S) Suspended
- (I) Ineligible
- (W) Walk-on
- Injured
- Current redshirt

Roster

== Schedule and results ==
Date time, TV	Rank^{#}	Opponent^{#}	Result	Record	High points	High rebounds	High assists	Site (attendance) city, state
Non-conference regular season
November 7, 2022*; 7:00 p.m., ESPN+		Centenary	W 106–55	1–0	26 – Brown	10 – Charles	7 – Fulks	Cajundome (2,045); Lafayette, LA
November 11, 2022*; 5:00 p.m., ESPN+		vs. Harvard; Asheville Championship semifinals	W 75–61	2–0	20 – Lewis II	11 – Lewis II	3 – Fulks	Harrah's Cherokee Center (565); Asheville, NC
November 13, 2022*; 3:30 p.m., ESPNU		vs. East Tennessee State; Asheville Championship final	W 81–77	3–0	14 – Brown	9 – Lewis II	5 – Fulks	Harrah's Cherokee Center (1,221); Asheville, NC
November 17, 2022*; 7:00 p.m., ESPN+		Louisiana Tech	W 94–88	4–0	23 – Lewis II	12 – Lewis II	7 – Fulks	Cajundome (3,181); Lafayette, LA
November 22, 2022*; 7:30 p.m., ESPN+		at SMU	W 76–72	5–0	26 – Brown	9 – Williams Jr.	6 – Thomas	Moody Coliseum (3,194); University Park, TX
November 26, 2022*; 5:00 p.m., ESPN+		at Drake	L 64–76	5–1	16 – Fulks	7 – Brown	3 – Fulks	Knapp Center (2,819); Des Moines, IA
November 29, 2022*; 7:00 p.m., ESPN+		Loyola (New Orleans)	W 104–70	6–1	27 – Brown	17 – Lewis II	9 – Fulks	Cajundome (2,630); Lafayette, LA
December 3, 2022*; 4:00 p.m., ESPN+		at New Orleans	W 78–77	7–1	27 – Williams Jr.	13 – Brown	5 – Fulks	Lakefront Arena (1,243); New Orleans, LA
December 10, 2022*; 7:00 p.m., ESPN+		Samford	W 75–58	8–1	19 – Lewis II	10 – Lewis II	7 – Fulks	Cajundome (2,643); Lafayette, LA
December 12, 2022*; 7:00 p.m., ESPN+		Louisiana Christian	W 98–63	9–1	37 – Brown	6 – Tied	11 – Fulks	Cajundome (2,475); Lafayette, LA
December 15, 2022*; 7:00 p.m., ESPN+		at McNeese State	W 78–70	10–1	20 – Brown	8 – Lewis II	6 – Fulks	The Legacy Center (2,101); Lake Charles, LA
December 21, 2022*; 7:00 p.m., LHN		at No. 7 Texas	L 72–100	10–2	20 – Brown	6 – Brown	5 – Fulks	Moody Center (10,763); Austin, TX
Sun Belt Conference regular season
December 29, 2022; 6:00 p.m., ESPN+		at Coastal Carolina	L 76–77	10–3 (0–1)	25 – Brown	10 – Lewis II	9 – Fulks	HTC Center (1,372); Conway, SC
December 31, 2022; 1:00 p.m., ESPN+		at Old Dominion	L 66–70	10–4 (0–2)	16 – Tied	11 – Brown	12 – Fulks	Chartway Arena (5,094); Norfolk, VA
January 5, 2023; 7:00 p.m., ESPN+		Southern Miss	W 75–61	11–4 (1–2)	20 – Garnett	9 – Lewis II	5 – Fulks	Cajundome (3,007); Lafayette, LA
January 7, 2023; 7:00 p.m., ESPN+		Georgia State	W 78–70	12–4 (2–2)	16 – Brown	10 – Brown	5 – Fulks	Cajundome (3,306); Lafayette, LA
January 12, 2023; 6:30 p.m., ESPN+		at Louisiana–Monroe	W 86–73	13–4 (3–2)	21 – Brown	8 – Lewis II	8 – Fulks	Fant–Ewing Coliseum (3,568); Monroe, LA
January 14, 2023; 3:00 p.m., ESPN+		at South Alabama	W 79–76	14–4 (4–2)	23 – Brown	8 – Brown	6 – Brown	Mitchell Center (2,246); Mobile, AL
January 19, 2023; 7:00 p.m., ESPN+		at Arkansas State	W 80–71	15–4 (5–2)	31 – Brown	13 – Brown	11 – Fulks	First National Bank Arena (1,132); Jonesboro, AR
January 21, 2023; 4:00 p.m., ESPN+		at Texas State	W 60–51	16–4 (6–2)	22 – Williams	9 – Brown	4 – Fulks	Strahan Coliseum (3,397); San Marcos, TX
January 26, 2023; 7:00 p.m., ESPN+		Troy	W 72–57	17–4 (7–2)	21 – Williams	11 – Lewis II	7 – Fulks	Cajundome (3,148); Lafayette, LA
January 28, 2023; 7:00 p.m., ESPN+		Georgia Southern	W 94–87	18–4 (8–2)	21 – Williams	11 – Lewis II	6 – Fulks	Cajundome (3,504); Lafayette, LA
February 2, 2023; 7:30 p.m., ESPN+		Texas State	W 82–63	19–4 (9–2)	23 – Williams Jr.	7 – Brown	9 – Fulks	Cajundome (3,256); Lafayette, LA
February 4, 2023; 7:00 p.m., ESPN+		Marshall	W 77–67	20–4 (10–2)	26 – Brown	20 – Brown	7 – Fulks	Cajundome (5,351); Lafayette, LA
February 9, 2023; 7:30 p.m., ESPN+		at Southern Miss	L 71–82	20–5 (10–3)	25 – Brown	8 – Tied	4 – Fulks	Reed Green Coliseum (8,097); Hattiesburg, MS
February 11, 2023; 4:00 p.m., ESPN+		at Troy	L 60–85	20–6 (10–4)	15 – Williams Jr.	8 – Richards	6 – Fulks	Trojan Arena (3,772); Troy, AL
February 16, 2023; 7:00 p.m., ESPN+		Louisiana–Monroe	W 84–67	21–6 (11–4)	17 – Fulks	7 – Brown	4 – Thomas	Cajundome (2,948); Lafayette, IN
February 18, 2023; 6:00 p.m., ESPN+		at James Madison	L 68–74	21–7 (11–5)	17 – Brown	10 – Brown	7 – Fulks	Atlantic Union Bank Center (5,668); Harrisonburg, VA
February 22, 2023; 7:30 p.m., ESPN+		Arkansas State	W 85–74	22–7 (12–5)	24 – Brown	12 – Brown	3 – Tied	Cajundome (2,615); Lafayette, LA
February 24, 2023; 7:00 p.m., ESPN+		South Alabama	W 74–64	23–7 (13–5)	28 – Brown	11 – Brown	5 – Fulks	Cajundome; Lafayette, LA
Sun Belt tournament
March 4, 2023; 7:30 p.m., ESPN+	(2)	vs. (7) Georgia Southern; Quarterfinals	W 67–49	24–7	16 – Brown	13 – Brown	3 – Lewis II	Pensacola Bay Center; Pensacola, FL
March 5, 2023; 7:30 p.m., ESPN+	(2)	vs. (11) Texas State; Semifinals	W 64–58	25–7	18 – Brown	7 – Tied	5 – Fulks	Pensacola Bay Center (2,050); Pensacola, FL
March 6, 2023; 6:00 p.m., ESPN2	(2)	vs. (8) South Alabama; Championship	W 71–66	26–7	23 – Fulks	16 – Brown	3 – Fulks	Pensacola Bay Center; Pensacola, FL
NCAA Tournament
March 16, 2023*; 8:40 pm, CBS	(13 E)	vs. (4 E) No. 20 Tennessee; First Round	L 55–58	26–8	16 – Brown	7 – Brown	11 – Fulks	Amway Center (18,018); Orlando, FL
*Non-conference game. ^{#}Rankings from AP Poll. (#) Tournament seedings in parentheses. E=East. All times are in Central Time.
