= 2022–23 Sun Belt Conference men's basketball season =

- League: NCAA Division I
- Sport: Basketball
- Teams: 14
- TV partner: ESPN

2022–23 NCAA Division I men's basketball season
- Regular season champions: Southern Miss
- Runners-up: Louisiana; Marshall
- Season MVP: Taevion Kinsey

Tournament
- Champions: Louisiana
- Runners-up: South Alabama
- Finals MVP: Jordan Brown

Basketball seasons
- ← 2021–22 2023–24 →

2022–23 Sun Belt Conference men's basketball standings
	Conf.				Overall
Team	W		L	PCT	W		L	PCT
Southern Miss	14	–	4	.778	25	–	8	.758
Louisiana †	13	–	5	.722	26	–	8	.765
Marshall	13	–	5	.722	24	–	8	.750
James Madison	12	–	6	.667	22	–	11	.667
Troy	11	–	7	.611	20	–	13	.606
Old Dominion	11	–	7	.611	19	–	12	.613
Georgia Southern	9	–	9	.500	17	–	16	.515
South Alabama	9	–	9	.500	19	–	16	.543
Appalachian State	9	–	9	.500	16	–	16	.500
Louisiana–Monroe	7	–	11	.389	11	–	21	.344
Texas State	6	–	12	.333	16	–	19	.457
Coastal Carolina	5	–	13	.278	11	–	20	.355
Arkansas State	4	–	14	.222	13	–	20	.394
Georgia State	3	–	15	.167	10	–	21	.323
† 2023 Sun Belt Tournament winner

The 2022–23 Sun Belt Conference men's basketball season was the season for Sun Belt Conference men's basketball teams that began with practices in October 2022, followed by the start of the 2022–23 NCAA Division I men's basketball season in November 2022. The regular season ended in March 2023.

== Conference realignment ==
The SBC lost two members and gained four in July 2022.

The conference's two non-football members, Little Rock and UT Arlington, left with Little Rock joining the Ohio Valley Conference and UT Arlington joining the Western Athletic Conference. Three schools left Conference USA to join the SBC—Marshall, Old Dominion, and Southern Miss, with Old Dominion returning to the SBC after a 31-year absence. James Madison joined from the Colonial Athletic Association.

== Head coaches ==
=== Coaching changes ===
==== Georgia State ====
Following an appearance in the 2022 NCAA Division I tournament, Georgia State head coach Rob Lanier left to coach the SMU Mustangs. On April 6, 2022, Jonas Hayes was named as the new head coach starting the 2022 regular season.

=== Coaches ===
Team	Head coach	Previous job	Years at school	Overall record	Sun Belt record	Sun Belt titles	Sun Belt Tournament titles	NCAA Tournaments
Appalachian State	Dustin Kerns	Presbyterian	4	70–58 (.547)	39–32 (.549)	0	1	1
Arkansas State	Mike Balado	Louisville (Asst.)	5	67–78 (.462)	36–50 (.419)	0	0	0
Coastal Carolina	Cliff Ellis	Auburn	15	283–203 (.582)	52–52 (.500)	0	0	2
Georgia Southern	Brian Burg	Texas Tech (Asst.)	2	25–28 (.472)	12–20 (.375)	0	0	0
Georgia State	Jonas Hayes	Xavier (Assoc.)	1	0–0 (–)	0–0 (–)	0	0	0
James Madison	Mark Byington	Georgia Southern	2	28–21 (.571)	0–0 (–)	0	0	0
Louisiana	Bob Marlin	Sam Houston	12	218–165 (.569)	127–91 (.583)	1	1	1
Louisiana–Monroe	Keith Richard	LSU (Asst.)	12	141–230 (.380)	78–142 (.355)	0	0	0
Marshall	Dan D'Antoni	Los Angeles Lakers (Asst.)	8	140–120 (.538)	0–0 (–)	0	0	1
Old Dominion	Jeff Jones	American	9	181–113 (.616)	0–0 (–)	0	0	1
South Alabama	Richie Riley	Nicholls	4	75–50 (.600)	40–31 (.563)	0	0	0
Southern Miss	Jay Ladner	Southeastern Louisiana	2	24–65 (.270)	0–0 (–)	0	0	0
Texas State	Terrence Johnson	Texas State (Asst.)	2	39–15 (.722)	24–6 (.800)	2	0	0
Troy	Scott Cross	TCU (Asst.)	4	40–50 (.444)	19–33 (.365)	0	0	0

Notes:

- All records, appearances, titles, etc. are from time with current school only.
- Year at school includes 2022–23 season.
- Overall and Sun Belt records are from time at current school only and are through the beginning of the season.

== Preseason ==
=== Preseason Coaches Poll ===
On October 17, 2022, the conference announced a preseason conference poll as voted on by the league's 14 head coaches.

Rank	Team
1.	Louisiana (10)
2.	Texas State (1)
3.	South Alabama (1)
4.	James Madison (1)
5.	Georgia State (1)
6.	Marshall
7.	Appalachian State
8.	Coastal Carolina
9.	Old Dominion
10.	Troy
11.	Georgia Southern
12.	Arkansas State
13.	Southern Miss
14.	Louisiana–Monroe
(first place votes)

=== Preseason Awards ===
The conference also announced preseason All-SBC teams.

Honor	Recipient
Preseason Player of the Year	Jordan Brown, Louisiana
All-SBC First Team	Jordan Brown, Louisiana
All-SBC First Team	Mason Harrell, Texas State
All-SBC First Team	Taevion Kinsey, Marshall
All-SBC First Team	Vado Morse, James Madison
All-SBC First Team	Kevin Samuel, South Alabama
All-SBC Second Team	Donovan Gregory, Appalachian State
All-SBC Second Team	Felipe Haase, Southern Miss
All-SBC Second Team	Kobe Julien, Louisiana
All-SBC Second Team	Essam Mostafa, Coastal Carolina
All-SBC Second Team	Greg Parham II, South Alabama
All-SBC Third Team	Kamdyn Curfman, Marshall
All-SBC Third Team	Caleb Fields, Arkansas State
All-SBC Third Team	Nika Metskhvarishvili, Louisiana–Monroe
All-SBC Third Team	Andrew Taylor, Marshall
All-SBC Third Team	Zay Williams, Troy

== Attendance ==
Team	**Arena**	**Capacity**	Game 1	Game 2	Game 3	Game 4	Game 5	Game 6	Game 7	Game 8	Game 9	Game 10	**Total**	**Average**	**% of Capacity**
**Team**	**Arena**	**Capacity**	Game 11	Game 12	Game 13	Game 14	Game 15	Game 16	Game 17	Game 18	Game 19	Game 20	**Total**	**Average**	**% of Capacity**
Appalachian State	Holmes Center	8,325	1,944	2,145	2,856	2,603	1,553	1,976	1,622	1,394	1,819	1,651	40,397	2,376	28.54%
Appalachian State	Holmes Center	8,325	2,377	2,559	3,487	2,685	3,870†	2,205	3,651				40,397	2,376	28.54%
Arkansas State	First National Bank Arena	10,038	3,092	1,387	3,686†	2,495	2,380	2,274	1,541	2,072	1,378	2,347	32,271	1,793	17.86%
Arkansas State	First National Bank Arena	10,038	1,257	1,024	1,132	1,084	1,341	1,402	1,026	1,353			32,271	1,793	17.86%
Coastal Carolina	HTC Center	3,370	1,223	1,127	1,003	1,509	1,327	1,934	1,372	1,201	2,143†	1,459	23,841	1,490	44.22%
Coastal Carolina	HTC Center	3,370	1,321	1,656	1,923	1,578	1,655	1,410					23,841	1,490	44.22%
Georgia Southern	Hanner Fieldhouse	4,325	1,328	512	1,423	724	545	501	573	957	1,009	1,412	20,527	1,283	29.66%
Georgia Southern	Hanner Fieldhouse	4,325	1,553	2,672†	1,863	1,727	1,283	2,445					20,527	1,283	29.66%
Georgia State	Georgia State Convocation Center	7,500	2,089	4,083†	1,607	1,259	1,198	1,331	1,416	1,385	1,440	1,176	33,997	1,789	23.86%
Georgia State	Georgia State Convocation Center	7,500	1,878	1,306	1,673	1,479	3,309	2,024	1,581	1,913	1,850		33,997	1,789	23.86%
James Madison	Atlantic Union Bank Center	8,500	3,148	3,768	4,303	3,642	2,785	3,068	3,540	3,787	5,609	6,429†	60,283	4,306	50.66%
James Madison	Atlantic Union Bank Center	8,500	4,829	5,668	4,688	5,019							60,283	4,306	50.66%
Louisiana	Cajundome	11,500	2,045	3,181	2,630	2,643	2,475	3,007	3,306	3,148	3,508	3,256	43,603	3,115	27.08%
Louisiana	Cajundome	11,500	5,351†	2,948	2,615	3,494							43,603	3,115	27.08%
Louisiana-Monroe	Fant-Ewing Coliseum	7,085	538	744	887	871	978	828	1,208	1,984	3,568	2,007	27,101	1,807	25.05%
Louisiana-Monroe	Fant-Ewing Coliseum	7,085	3,659†	3,023	3,558	962	2,286						27,101	1,807	25.05%
Marshall	Cam Henderson Center	9,048	4,240	3,625	3,573	4,315	4,012	5,180	4,065	4,035	4,816	4,508	79,145	4,656	51.45%
Marshall	Cam Henderson Center	9,048	4,672	4,321	5,719†	4,931	5,711	5,711	5,711				79,145	4,656	51.45%
Old Dominion	Chartway Arena	8,472	4,798	5,085	4,898	7,966†	4,579	4,741	4,297	4,464	5,094	6,021	89,903	5,619	66.23%
Old Dominion	Chartway Arena	8,472	5,433	5,954	7,691	7,029	5,428	6,425					89,903	5,619	66.23%
South Alabama	Mitchell Center	10,041	2,019	7,673†	1,667	1,455	1,451	1,812	1,725	2,246	1,894	2,779	32,180	2,299	22.89%
South Alabama	Mitchell Center	10,041	1,955	1,404	2,398	1,702							32,180	2,299	22.89%
Southern Miss	Reed Green Coliseum	8,095	2,523	2,350	2,428	3,022	2,581	2,600	3,265	3,192	4,128	4,318	56,534	3,769	46.56%
Southern Miss	Reed Green Coliseum	8,095	4,266	4,289	**8,097**†	4,587	4,888						56,534	3,769	46.56%
Texas State	Strahan Arena	10,000	1,131	1,282	1,189	1,329	877	1,052	941	3,183	3,397†	2,331	26,261	1,876	18.76
Texas State	Strahan Arena	10,000	2,638	2,518	1,776	2,617							26,261	1,876	18.76
Troy	Trojan Arena	6,000	2,879	2,498	2,130	2,987	2,081	2,322	2,972	2,953	3,154	3,314	42,500	3,306	50.60%
Troy	Trojan Arena	6,000	3,192	4,014	3,772	4,232†							42,500	3,306	50.60%

Bold – At or exceeded capacity

† – Season high

== Honors and awards ==
=== Sun Belt Awards ===
2022-23 Sun Belt Men's Basketball Individual Awards
Award	Recipient(s)
Player of the Year	Taevion Kinsey – Marshall
Coach of the Year	Jay Ladner – Southern Miss
Defensive Player of the Year	Kevin Samuel – South Alabama
Newcomer of the Year	Austin Crowley – Southern Miss
Freshman of the Year	Micah Handlogten – Marshall
Sixth Man Award	Terrence Edwards Jr. – James Madison

2022-23 Sun Belt Men's Basketball All-Conference Teams
First Team	Second Team	Third Team
Jordan Brown – Louisiana; Taevion Kinsey – Marshall; Andrew Taylor – Marshall; Isaiah Moore – South Alabama; Austin Crowley – Southern Miss	Andrei Savrasov – Georgia Southern; Terrence Edwards Jr. – James Madison; Greg Williams – Louisiana; Felipe Haase – Southern Miss; Zay Williams – Troy	Donovan Gregory – Appalachian State; Jamari Blackmon – ULM; Chaunce Jenkins – Old Dominion; Kevin Samuel – South Alabama; DeAndre Pinckney – Southern Miss; Mason Harrell – Texas State
