= 2022–23 Georgia State Panthers men's basketball team =

American college basketball season

2022–23 Georgia State Panthers men's basketball
- Conference: Sun Belt Conference
- Record: 10–21 (3–15 Sun Belt)
- Head coach: Jonas Hayes (1st season)
- Assistant coaches: Danny Peters (1st season); Jarvis Hayes (4th season); Allen Payne (1st season)
- Home arena: GSU Convocation Center

2022–23 Sun Belt Conference men's basketball standings
	Conf.				Overall
Team	W		L	PCT	W		L	PCT
Southern Miss	14	–	4	.778	25	–	8	.758
Louisiana †	13	–	5	.722	26	–	8	.765
Marshall	13	–	5	.722	24	–	8	.750
James Madison	12	–	6	.667	22	–	11	.667
Troy	11	–	7	.611	20	–	13	.606
Old Dominion	11	–	7	.611	19	–	12	.613
Georgia Southern	9	–	9	.500	17	–	16	.515
South Alabama	9	–	9	.500	19	–	16	.543
Appalachian State	9	–	9	.500	16	–	16	.500
Louisiana–Monroe	7	–	11	.389	11	–	21	.344
Texas State	6	–	12	.333	16	–	19	.457
Coastal Carolina	5	–	13	.278	11	–	20	.355
Arkansas State	4	–	14	.222	13	–	20	.394
Georgia State	3	–	15	.167	10	–	21	.323
† 2023 Sun Belt Tournament winner

The 2022–23 Georgia State Panthers men's basketball team represented Georgia State University during the 2022–23 NCAA Division I men's basketball season. The Panthers, led by first-year head coach Jonas Hayes, played their home games at new the GSU Convocation Center in Atlanta, Georgia as members of the Sun Belt Conference.

== Previous season ==
The Panthers finished the 2021–22 season 18–11, 9–5 in Sun Belt play to finish in third place. They defeated Arkansas State, Appalachian State, and Louisiana to win the Sun Belt tournament championship. As a result, they received the conference's automatic bid to the NCAA tournament as the No. 16 seed in the West region. They lost in the first round to overall No. 1 seed Gonzaga.

On March 27, 2022, head coach Rob Lanier left the school to take the head coaching position at SMU. On April 6, the school named Xavier assistant and former University of Georgia player Jonas Hayes the team's new basketball coach.

The season marked the Panthers' final season at the GSU Sports Arena, with the new GSU Convocation Center set to open for the 2022–23 season.

== Offseason ==
=== Departures ===
Georgia State Departures
Name	Number	Pos.	Height	Weight	Year	Hometown	Reason for departure
Eliel Nsoseme	1	F	6'8"	235	Senior	Kinshasa, DR Congo	Graduated
Justin Roberts	2	G	5'10"	170	Senior	Indianapolis, IN	Graduated; Signed to play with Fribourg Olympic
Jordan Rawls	4	G	6'1"	180	Junior	Chattanooga, TN	Transferred to Western Kentucky
Nelson Phillips	10	G	6'4"	190	RS Junior	Waner Robins, GA	Transferred to Troy
Corey Allen	11	G	6'2"	195	Senior	Ypsilanti, MI	Graduated; Signed to play with Pieno Zvaigzdes
Kane Williams	12	G	6'4"	190	Senior	Douglasville, GA	Graduated
Chien-Hao Ma	14	F	6'7"	180	Freshman	Taichung City, Taiwan	Signed to play professionally in China with Jiangsu Dragons
Jalen Thomas	25	F	6'10"	230	Junior	Detroit, MI	Transferred to Butler
Zach Pina	31	G	6'0"	165	Junior	Peachtree City, GA	Walk-on; didn't return

=== Incoming transfers ===
Georgia State Incoming Transfers
Name	Number	Pos.	Height	Weight	Year	Hometown	Previous School	Years Remaining
Dwon Odom	1	G	6'2"	182	Sophomore	Alpharetta, GA	Xavier	2
Jamaine Mann	2	G	6'6"	230	Sophomore	Hampton, GA	Vanderbilt	2
Brenden Tucker	5	G	6'3"	180	Junior	Lawrenceville, GA	College of Charleston	2

=== 2022 Recruiting class ===
College recruiting information
Name	Hometown	School	Height	Weight	Commit date
Edward Nnamoko; C	Miami, FL	Riviera Preparatory School	6 ft 10 in (2.08 m)	225 lb (102 kg)	Apr 20, 2022
Edward Nnamoko; C	Recruit ratings: No ratings found				
Overall recruit ranking:
Note: In many cases, Scout, Rivals, 247Sports, On3, and ESPN may conflict in their listings of height and weight.; In these cases, the average was taken. ESPN grades are on a 100-point scale.; Sources: "Georgia State 2022 Basketball Commits". ESPN.; "2022 Team Ranking". Rivals.

==== 2023 Recruiting class ====
College recruiting information (2023)
Name	Hometown	School	Height	Weight	Commit date
DK Manyiel; C	Decatur, GA	Greenforest Mccalep Christian Academy	7 ft 0 in (2.13 m)	200 lb (91 kg)	Aug 19, 2022
DK Manyiel; C	Recruit ratings: Scout: Rivals: 247Sports: ESPN: (78)				
Vashon Ferguson; SG	Grovetown, GA	Grovetown High School	6 ft 4 in (1.93 m)	190 lb (86 kg)	Jul 31, 2022
Vashon Ferguson; SG	Recruit ratings: No ratings found				
Overall recruit ranking:
Note: In many cases, Scout, Rivals, 247Sports, On3, and ESPN may conflict in their listings of height and weight.; In these cases, the average was taken. ESPN grades are on a 100-point scale.; Sources: "Georgia State 2023 Basketball Commits". ESPN.; "2023 Team Ranking". Rivals.

== Preseason ==
=== Preseason Sun Belt Conference poll ===
The Panthers were picked to finish in fifth place in the conference's preseason poll.

Coaches poll
Predicted finish	Team (1st place Votes)
1	Louisiana - 190 (10)
2	Texas State - 162 (1)
3	South Alabama - 150 (1)
4	James Madison - 149 (1)
5	Georgia State - 127 (1)
6	Marshall - 122
7	App State - 120
8	Coastal Carolina - 100
9	Old Dominion - 93
10	Troy - 76
11	Georgia Southern - 69
12	Arkansas State - 48
13	Southern Miss - 34
14	ULM - 30

== Roster ==
2022–23 Georgia State Panthers men's basketball team
Players
Coaches

Pos.	#	Name	Height	Weight	Year	Previous school	Hometown
G	0	Evan Johnson	5 ft 11 in (1.8 m)	165 lb (75 kg)	So	Oak Hill Academy	Durham, NC
G	1	Dwon Odom	6 ft 2 in (1.88 m)	182 lb (83 kg)	Jr	St. Francis HS; Xavier	Alpharetta, GA
G	2	Jamaine Mann	6 ft 6 in (1.98 m)	230 lb (104 kg)	So	Dutchtown HS; Vanderbilt	Hampton, GA
C	4	Edward Nnamoko	6 ft 10 in (2.08 m)	220 lb (100 kg)	Fr	Riviera Prep (FL)	Lagos, Nigeria
G	5	Brenden Tucker	6 ft 3 in (1.91 m)	195 lb (88 kg)	Jr	Dacula HS; College of Charleston	Lawrenceville, GA
G	11	Jalen Bouknight (W)	6 ft 1 in (1.85 m)	185 lb (84 kg)	Fr	Archbishop Spalding HS	Odenton, MD
F	15	Ja'Heim Hudson	6 ft 7 in (2.01 m)	230 lb (104 kg)	So	Wheeler HS	Hinesville, GA
G	20	Danny Stubbs	6 ft 0 in (1.83 m)	174 lb (79 kg)	So	Pebblerbrook HS	Austell, GA
G	21	Kalik Brooks (W)	6 ft 5 in (1.96 m)	190 lb (86 kg)	Jr	Alpharetta HS	Alpharetta, GA
C	23	Joe Jones III	6 ft 9 in (2.06 m)	230 lb (104 kg)	RS So	The Park School	Buffalo, NY
G	24	Collin Moore (injured)	6 ft 4 in (1.93 m)	205 lb (93 kg)	So	Sunrise Christian Academy	North Little Rock, AR
F	30	Kaleb Scott	6 ft 6 in (1.98 m)	235 lb (107 kg)	So	Holly Springs HS	Fuquay-Varina, NC
F	33	Jamall Clyce (injured)	6 ft 6 in (1.98 m)	195 lb (88 kg)	So	Pebblebrook HS	Richmond Hill, GA

Head coach

- Jonas Hayes (Georgia)

Assistant coach(es)

- Danny Peters (Ohio State)
- Jarvis Hayes (Georgia)
- Allen Payne (Auburn)

Legend

- (C) Team captain
- (S) Suspended
- (I) Ineligible
- (W) Walk-on
- Injured
- Current redshirt

Roster

== Schedule and results ==
Date time, TV	Rank^{#}	Opponent^{#}	Result	Record	High points	High rebounds	High assists	Site (attendance) city, state
Exhibition
October 31, 2022*; 7:00 p.m.		Morehouse	W 68–57		20 – Tucker	12 – Odom	6 – Odom	GSU Convocation Center (1,928); Atlanta, GA
Non-conference regular season
November 7, 2022*; 8:00 p.m., ESPN+		Coastal Georgia	W 76–59	1–0	16 – Hudson	10 – Hudson	4 – Odom	GSU Convocation Center (2,089); Atlanta, GA
November 12, 2022*; 7:00 p.m., ESPN+		Georgia Tech	L 57–59	1–1	23 – Hudson	11 – Hudson	5 – Odom	GSU Convocation Center (4,083); Atlanta, GA
November 15, 2022*; 7:00 p.m., ESPN+		Mercer	W 85–83 ^{OT}	2–1	21 – Odom	4 – Hudson	3 – Johnson	GSU Convocation Center (1,607); Atlanta, GA
November 18, 2022*; 6:00 p.m., ESPN+		Eastern Kentucky; Capitol Classic	L 61–62	2–2	16 – Odom	9 – Hudson	2 – Tied	GSU Convocation Center (1,259); Atlanta, GA
November 19, 2022*; 3:00 p.m., ESPN+		Texas A&M–Commerce; Capitol Classic	W 57–53	3–2	20 – Odom	6 – Tied	4 – Odom	GSU Convocation Center (1,198); Atlanta, GA
November 20, 2022*; 3:30 p.m., ESPN+		UNC Asheville; Capitol Classic	W 74–68	4–2	27 – Odom	7 – Tied	5 – Mann	GSU Convocation Center (1,331); Atlanta, GA
November 27, 2022*; 2:00 p.m., ESPN+		Belmont	L 66–68	4–3	24 – Odom	9 – Hudson	4 – Odom	GSU Convocation Center (1,416); Atlanta, GA
December 1, 2022*; 7:00 p.m., ESPN+		Middle Georgia State	W 79–53	5–3	19 – Mann	13 – Hudson	5 – Johnson	GSU Convocation Center (1,385); Atlanta, GA
December 4, 2022*; 2:00 p.m., FloSports		at Northeastern	L 46–66	5–4	11 – Hudson	8 – Hudson	3 – Johnson	Matthews Arena (627); Boston, MA
December 14, 2022*; 8:00 p.m., SECN+		at No. 19 Auburn	L 64–72	5–5	14 – Johnson	11 – Hudson	5 – Odom	Neville Arena (9,121); Auburn, AL
December 18, 2022*; 2:00 p.m., ESPN+		Rhode Island	W 75–66	6–5	15 – Tucker	6 – Brooks	8 – Odom	GSU Convocation Center (1,440); Atlanta, GA
December 21, 2022*; 12:00 p.m., ESPN+		Toccoa Falls	W 91–52	7–5	18 – Jones III	10 – Jones III	6 – Mann	GSU Convocation Center (1,176); Atlanta, GA
Sun Belt Conference regular season
December 29, 2022; 7:00 p.m., ESPN+		James Madison	L 47–63	7–6 (0–1)	17 – Odom	7 – Odom	3 – Odom	GSU Convocation Center (1,878); Atlanta, GA
December 31, 2022; 2:00 p.m., ESPN+		South Alabama	W 68–58	8–6 (1–1)	18 – Tied	11 – Hudson	2 – Tied	GSU Convocation Center (1,306); Atlanta, GA
January 5, 2023; 7:30 p.m., ESPN+		at Louisiana–Monroe	L 58–66	8–7 (1–2)	25 – Tucker	6 – Tied	4 – Johnson	Fant–Ewing Coliseum (1,208); Monroe, LA
January 7, 2023; 8:00 p.m., ESPN+		at Louisiana	L 70–78	8–8 (1–3)	18 – Odom	6 – Nnamoko	2 – Johnson	Cajundome (3,306); Lafayette, LA
January 12, 2023; 7:00 p.m., ESPN+		Troy	L 53–65	8–9 (1–4)	21 – Tucker	9 – Clyce	3 – Tied	GSU Convocation Center (1,673); Atlanta, GA
January 14, 2023; 2:00 p.m., ESPN+		Coastal Carolina	W 100–66	9–9 (2–4)	26 – Hudson	5 – Tied	11 – Odom	GSU Convocation Center (1,479); Atlanta, GA
January 19, 2023; 7:00 p.m., ESPN+		at Old Dominion	L 58–70	9–10 (2–5)	15 – Johnson	8 – Hudson	5 – Johnson	Chartway Arena (5,433); Norfolk, VA
January 21, 2023; 3:00 p.m., ESPN+		at Georgia Southern; Rivalry	L 52–58	9–11 (2–6)	17 – Moore	7 – Tied	2 – Tied	Hanner Fieldhouse (2,672); Statesboro, GA
January 26, 2023; 6:30 p.m., ESPN+		at Appalachian State	L 59–71	9–12 (2–7)	16 – Mann	8 – Tied	3 – Odom	Holmes Center (2,559); Boone, NC
January 28, 2023; 7:00 p.m., ESPN+		at Marshall	L 65–103	9–13 (2–8)	12 – Mann	14 – Jones III	3 – Tied	Cam Henderson Center (5,711); Huntington, WV
February 2, 2023; 7:00 p.m., ESPN+		Georgia Southern; Rivalry	W 64–60	10–13 (3–8)	20 – Tucker	11 – Moore	7 – Odom	GSU Convocation Center (3,309); Atlanta, GA
February 4, 2023; 2:00 p.m., ESPN+		Southern Miss	L 71–79	10–14 (3–9)	17 – Tucker	10 – Mann	7 – Odom	GSU Convocation Center (2,024); Atlanta, GA
February 9, 2023; 7:00 p.m., ESPN+		Old Dominion	L 60–63	10–15 (3–10)	15 – Tied	8 – Hudson	5 – Odom	GSU Convocation Center (1,581); Atlanta, GA
February 11, 2023; 2:00 p.m., ESPN+		Marshall	L 77–88	10–16 (3–11)	28 – Moore	9 – Odom	5 – Odom	GSU Conovcation Center (1,913); Atlanta, GA
February 16, 2023; 7:00 p.m., ESPN+		at Coastal Carolina	L 68–77	10–17 (3–12)	18 – Mann	9 – Mann	5 – Odom	HTC Center (1,655); Conway, SC
February 18, 2023; 3:00 p.m., ESPN+		at Arkansas State	L 70–75	10–18 (3–13)	18 – Tied	7 – Moore	5 – Odom	First National Bank Arena; Jonesboro, AR
February 22, 2023; 7:00 p.m., ESPN+		Appalachian State	L 52–78	10–19 (3–14)	19 – Tucker	9 – Mann	5 – Odom	GSU Conovcation Center (1,850); Atlanta, GA
February 24, 2023; 8:00 p.m., ESPN+		at James Madison	L 69–90	10–20 (3–15)	16 – Tied	7 – Mann	4 – Odom	Atlantic Union Bank Center (5,019); Williamsburg, VA
Sun Belt tournament
February 28, 2023; 8:30 p.m., ESPN+	(14)	vs. (11) Texas State; First Round	L 76–81	10–21	25 – Moore	6 – Hudson	2 – Odom	Pensacola Bay Center (748); Pensacola, FL
*Non-conference game. ^{#}Rankings from AP Poll. (#) Tournament seedings in parentheses. All times are in Eastern Time.
