= 2023 Sun Belt Conference men's basketball tournament =

U.S. collegiate basketball event

- Classification: Division I
- Season: 2022–23
- Teams: 14
- Site: Pensacola Bay Center; Pensacola, Florida
- Champions: Louisiana (7th title)
- Winning coach: Bob Marlin (2nd title)
- MVP: Jordan Brown (Louisiana)
- Television: ESPN+, ESPN2

The 2023 Sun Belt Conference men's basketball tournament was the postseason men's basketball tournament for Sun Belt Conference during the 2022–23 NCAA Division I men's basketball season. All tournament games were played at Pensacola Bay Center between February 28–March 6. The winner, Louisiana, received the Sun Belt's automatic bid to the 2023 NCAA tournament.

2022–23 Sun Belt Conference men's basketball standings
	Conf.				Overall
Team	W		L	PCT	W		L	PCT
Southern Miss	14	–	4	.778	25	–	8	.758
Louisiana †	13	–	5	.722	26	–	8	.765
Marshall	13	–	5	.722	24	–	8	.750
James Madison	12	–	6	.667	22	–	11	.667
Troy	11	–	7	.611	20	–	13	.606
Old Dominion	11	–	7	.611	19	–	12	.613
Georgia Southern	9	–	9	.500	17	–	16	.515
South Alabama	9	–	9	.500	19	–	16	.543
Appalachian State	9	–	9	.500	16	–	16	.500
Louisiana–Monroe	7	–	11	.389	11	–	21	.344
Texas State	6	–	12	.333	16	–	19	.457
Coastal Carolina	5	–	13	.278	11	–	20	.355
Arkansas State	4	–	14	.222	13	–	20	.394
Georgia State	3	–	15	.167	10	–	21	.323
† 2023 Sun Belt Tournament winner

== Seeds ==
All 14 conference teams qualified for the tournament. The teams were seeded by record within the conference, along with a tiebreaker system used to seed teams with identical conference records. The top-ten teams received a first-round bye and the top-four teams received a double bye, automatically advancing them into the quarterfinals.

Seed	School	Conference	Tiebreaker
1	Southern Miss	14–4	
2	Louisiana	13–5	1–0 vs. Marshall
3	Marshall	13–5	0–1 vs. Louisiana
4	James Madison	12–6	
5	Troy	11–7	1–0 vs. Old Dominion
6	Old Dominion	11–7	0–1 vs. Troy
7	Georgia Southern	9–9	3–0 vs. South Alabama/Appalachian State
8	South Alabama	9–9	1–1 vs. Georgia Southern/Appalachian State
9	Appalachian State	9–9	0–3 vs. Georgia Southern/South Alabama
10	Louisiana–Monroe	7–11	
11	Texas State	6–12	
12	Coastal Carolina	5–13	
13	Arkansas State	4–14	
14	Georgia State	3–15	

== Schedule ==
Game	Time	Matchup	Score	Television
First round – Tuesday, February 28
1	5:00 pm	No. 12 Coastal Carolina vs. No. 13 Arkansas State	69–86	ESPN+
2	7:30 pm	No. 11 Texas State vs. No. 14 Georgia State	81–76	ESPN+
Second round – Thursday, March 2
3	11:30 am	No. 8 South Alabama vs. No. 9 Appalachian State	68–61	ESPN+
4	2:00 pm	No. 5 Troy vs. No. 13 Arkansas State	63–59	ESPN+
5	5:00 pm	No. 6 Old Dominion vs.No. 11 Texas State	65-36	ESPN+
6	7:30 pm	No. 7 Georgia Southern vs. No. 10 Louisiana–Monroe	66-57	ESPN+
Quarterfinals – Saturday, March 4
7	11:30 am	No. 1 Southern Miss vs. No. 8 South Alabama	61–78	ESPN+
8	2:00 pm	No. 4 James Madison vs. No. 5 Troy	75–72	ESPN+
9	5:00 pm	No. 3 Marshall vs. No. 11 Texas State	68–71	ESPN+
10	7:30 pm	No. 2 Louisiana vs. No. 7 Georgia Southern	67–49	ESPN+
Semifinals – Sunday, March 5
11	5:00 pm	No. 8 South Alabama vs. No. 4 James Madison	75–66	ESPN+
12	7:30 pm	No. 2 Louisiana vs. No. 11 Texas State	64–58	ESPN+
Championship – Monday, March 6
13	6:00 pm	No. 8 South Alabama vs. No. 2 Louisiana	66–71	ESPN2
Game times in CT. Rankings denote tournament seed

== Bracket ==
First round Tuesday, February 28; ESPN+
12	Coastal Carolina	69
13	Arkansas State	86
11	Texas State	81
14	Georgia State	74

Second round Thursday, March 2 ESPN+
8	South Alabama	68
9	Appalachian State	61
5	Troy	63
13	Arkansas State	59
7	Georgia Southern	66
10	Louisiana-Monroe	57
6	Old Dominion	36
11	Texas State	65

Quarterfinals; Saturday, March 4 ESPN+
1	Southern Miss	61
8	South Alabama	78
4	James Madison	75
5	Troy	72
2	Louisiana	67
7	Georgia Southern	49
3	Marshall	68
11	Texas State	71

Semifinals; Sunday, March 5 ESPN+
8	South Alabama	75
4	James Madison	66
2	Louisiana	64
11	Texas State	58

Championship; Monday, March 6 ESPN2
8	South Alabama	66
2	Louisiana	71

== See also ==
2023 Sun Belt Conference women's basketball tournament
