= 2022–23 Marshall Thundering Herd men's basketball team =

American college basketball season

2022–23 Marshall Thundering Herd men's basketball
- Conference: Sun Belt Conference
- Record: 24–8 (13–5 Sun Belt)
- Head coach: Dan D'Antoni (9th season)
- Assistant coaches: Mark Cline; Cornelius Jackson; Adam Williams
- Home arena: Cam Henderson Center

2022–23 Sun Belt Conference men's basketball standings
	Conf.				Overall
Team	W		L	PCT	W		L	PCT
Southern Miss	14	–	4	.778	25	–	8	.758
Louisiana †	13	–	5	.722	26	–	8	.765
Marshall	13	–	5	.722	24	–	8	.750
James Madison	12	–	6	.667	22	–	11	.667
Troy	11	–	7	.611	20	–	13	.606
Old Dominion	11	–	7	.611	19	–	12	.613
Georgia Southern	9	–	9	.500	17	–	16	.515
South Alabama	9	–	9	.500	19	–	16	.543
Appalachian State	9	–	9	.500	16	–	16	.500
Louisiana–Monroe	7	–	11	.389	11	–	21	.344
Texas State	6	–	12	.333	16	–	19	.457
Coastal Carolina	5	–	13	.278	11	–	20	.355
Arkansas State	4	–	14	.222	13	–	20	.394
Georgia State	3	–	15	.167	10	–	21	.323
† 2023 Sun Belt Tournament winner

The 2022–23 Marshall Thundering Herd men's basketball team represented Marshall University during the 2022–23 NCAA Division I men's basketball season. The Thundering Herd, led by ninth-year head coach Dan D'Antoni, played their home games at the Cam Henderson Center in Huntington, West Virginia as members of the Sun Belt Conference. They finished the season 24–8, 13–5 in Sun Belt play, to finish in a tie for second place. They lost to Texas State in the quarterfinals of the Sun Belt tournament. Despite finishing with 24 wins, they did not participate in a postseason tournament.

The season marked the school's inaugural season in the Sun Belt Conference after spending the previous 17 seasons as a member of Conference USA.

== Previous season ==
The Thundering Herd finished the season 12–21, 4–14 in C-USA play, to finish in seventh place in the East Division. They defeated FIU in the first round of the C-USA tournament before losing to Louisiana Tech in the second round.

On October 30, 2021, Marshall announced they would become a member of the Sun Belt Conference. On March 29, it was announced they would officially join on July 1, 2022, making it the final season competing in C-USA.

== Offseason ==
=== Departures ===
Name	Number	Pos.	Height	Weight	Year	Hometown	Notes
Mikel Beyers	31	F	6' 10"	225	Senior	Houston, TX	Graduated
Devin Collins	35	G	6' 8"	200	RS Freshman	Chapmanville, WV	Transferred to Pikeville
Jeremy Dillon	5	G/F	6' 5"	190	RS Sophomore	Mingo, WV	Transferred to West Virginia State (football)
Darius George	2	F	6' 7"	205	Senior	Staunton, VA	Graduated

=== Incoming transfers ===
Name	Number	Pos.	Height	Weight	Year	Hometown	Previous school
Kamdyn Curfman	11	G	6' 1"	186	Junior	North Bethesda, MD	VMI

=== 2022 recruiting class ===
College recruiting
Name	Hometown	School	Height	Weight	Commit date
Jacob Conner; SF	Kettering, OH	Archbishop Alter High School	6 ft 9 in (2.06 m)	195 lb (88 kg)	Jul 13, 2021
Jacob Conner; SF	Recruit ratings: Rivals: (NR)				
Micah Handlogten; C	Huntersville, NC	Southlake Christian Academy	7 ft 0 in (2.13 m)	190 lb (86 kg)	Sep 21, 2021
Micah Handlogten; C	Recruit ratings: Rivals: (NR)				
Overall recruit ranking: Rivals: NR 247Sports: NR ESPN: NR
Note: In many cases, Scout, Rivals, 247Sports, On3, and ESPN may conflict in their listings of height and weight.; In these cases, the average was taken. ESPN grades are on a 100-point scale.; Sources: "Marshall Basketball Commitment List". Rivals.; "ESPN". ESPN.; "2022 Team Ranking". Rivals.

== Preseason ==
=== Preseason Sun Belt Conference poll ===
The Thundering Herd were picked to finish in sixth place in the conference's preseason poll. Senior guard Taevion Kinsey was named to the preseason All-SBC First Team. Junior guards Andrew Taylor and Kamdyn Curfman were named to the preseason All-SBC Third Team.

Coaches poll
Predicted finish	Team (1st-place votes)
1	Louisiana – 190 (10)
2	Texas State – 162 (1)
3	South Alabama – 150 (1)
4	James Madison – 149 (1)
5	Georgia State – 127 (1)
6	Marshall – 122
7	App State – 120
8	Coastal Carolina – 100
9	Old Dominion – 93
10	Troy – 76
11	Georgia Southern – 69
12	Arkansas State – 48
13	Southern Miss – 34
14	ULM – 30

== Roster ==
2022–23 Marshall Thundering Herd men's basketball team
Players
Coaches

Pos.	#	Name	Height	Weight	Year	Previous school	Hometown
G	0	Andrew Taylor	6 ft 3 in (1.91 m)	194 lb (88 kg)	RS Sr	Corbin	Corbin, KY
F	1	Chase McKey	6 ft 10 in (2.08 m)	198 lb (90 kg)	So	The Skill Factory	Atlanta, GA
F	2	Wyatt Fricks	6 ft 9 in (2.06 m)	196 lb (89 kg)	RS Fr	Winder-Barrow	Winder, GA
G	3	Kyle Braun	6 ft 2 in (1.88 m)	177 lb (80 kg)	So	Scotland Prep	Los Angeles, CA
G/F	4	Jacob Conner	6 ft 8 in (2.03 m)	191 lb (87 kg)	Fr	Archbishop Alter	Dayton, OH
C	5	Micah Handlogten	7 ft 1 in (2.16 m)	227 lb (103 kg)	Fr	SouthLake Christian	Huntersville, NC
G	11	Kamdyn Curfman	6 ft 1 in (1.85 m)	190 lb (86 kg)	Jr	VMI	North Bethesda, MD
G/F	12	Aymeric Toussaint	6 ft 10 in (2.08 m)	237 lb (108 kg)	So	Hoosac	Saint-Denis, Réunion
G	13	Creighton Thienneman (W)	6 ft 5 in (1.96 m)	192 lb (87 kg)	So	South Oldham	Louisville, KY
G/F	15	Marko Sarenac	6 ft 7 in (2.01 m)	207 lb (94 kg)	Jr	Hoosac	Ljubovija, Serbia
C	21	Goran Miladinovic	7 ft 0 in (2.13 m)	244 lb (111 kg)	Jr	Hoosac	Tivat, Montenegro
G	23	David Early	6 ft 4 in (1.93 m)	234 lb (106 kg)	So	Logan	Logan, WV
G	24	Taevion Kinsey	6 ft 5 in (1.96 m)	191 lb (87 kg)	Sr	Eastmoor	Columbus, OH
F	25	Obinna Anochili-Killen	6 ft 8 in (2.03 m)	222 lb (101 kg)	So	Chapmanville	Lagos, Nigeria

Head coach

- Dan D'Antoni (Marshall)

Assistant coach(es)

- Mark Cline (Wake Forest)
- Cornelius Jackson (Marshall)
- Adam Williams (Marshall)

Legend

- (C) Team captain
- (S) Suspended
- (I) Ineligible
- (W) Walk-on
- Injured
- Current redshirt

Roster
Last update: August 31, 2026

== Schedule and results ==
Date time, TV	Rank^{#}	Opponent^{#}	Result	Record	High points	High rebounds	High assists	Site (attendance) city, state
Exhibition
October 28, 2022*; 7:00 p.m.		Charleston (WV)	W 92–66	–	29 – Taylor	10 – 2 tied	6 – Taylor	Cam Henderson Center (3,608); Huntington, WV
November 2, 2022*; 7:00 p.m.		Pikeville	W 83–69	–	24 – Taylor	9 – Handlogten	6 – Taylor	Cam Henderson Center (3,719); Huntington, WV
Non-conference regular season
November 7, 2022*; 7:00 p.m., ESPN+		at Queens	L 82–83	0–1	23 – Kinsey	10 – Kinsey	4 – 3 tied	Curry Arena (1,608); Charlotte, NC
November 14, 2022*; 7:00 p.m., ESPN+		Tennessee Tech; Marshall/Tennessee Tech MTE	W 91–65	1–1	28 – Kinsey	8 – 3 tied	7 – Kinsey	Cam Henderson Center (4,240); Huntington, WV
November 17, 2022*; 7:00 p.m., ESPN+		at Miami (OH)	W 95–69	2–1	26 – Taylor	12 – Handlogten	6 – Conner	Millett Hall (2,157); Oxford, OH
November 19, 2022*; 7:00 p.m., ESPN+		Coppin State; Marshall/Tennessee Tech MTE	W 86–67	3–1	23 – Kinsey	11 – Anochili-Killen	8 – Kinsey	Cam Henderson Center (3,625); Huntington, WV
November 21, 2022*; 7:00 p.m., ESPN+		Chicago State	W 82–70	4–1	24 – Taylor	13 – Handlogten	7 – Kinsey	Cam Henderson Center (3,573); Huntington, WV
November 26, 2022*; 7:00 p.m., ESPN+		Morehead State	W 83–59	5–1	19 – Taylor	14 – Handlogten	7 – Taylor	Cam Henderson Center (4,315); Huntington, WV
November 30, 2022*; 7:00 p.m., ESPN+		Akron	W 68–57	6–1	21 – Kinsey	10 – Taylor	6 – Taylor	Cam Henderson Center (4,012); Huntington, WV
December 3, 2022*; 5:00 p.m., ESPN+		Ohio	W 83–69	7–1	19 – Taylor	9 – Kinsey	5 – Kinsey	Cam Henderson Center (5,180); Huntington, WV
December 8, 2022*; 7:00 p.m., ESPN+		at Duquesne	W 82–71	8–1	19 – Kinsey	16 – Handlogten	7 – Kinsey	UPMC Cooper Fieldhouse (1,967); Pittsburgh, PA
December 10, 2022*; 7:00 p.m., ESPN+		at Robert Morris	W 69–60	9–1	26 – Kinsey	13 – Handlogten	5 – Kinsey	UPMC Events Center (1,627); Moon Township, PA
December 13, 2022*; 7:00 p.m., ESPN+		at UNC Greensboro	L 67–75	9–2	24 – Kinsey	10 – Anochili-Killen	6 – Kinsey	Greensboro Coliseum (1,089); Greensboro, NC
December 17, 2022*; 3:30 p.m., ESPN+		Toledo	W 100–85	10–2	30 – Kinsey	13 – Handlogten	6 – Taylor	Cam Henderson Center (4,065); Huntington, WV
December 19, 2022*; 7:00 p.m., ESPN+		Glenville State	W 99–73	11–2	22 – Taylor	14 – Handlogten	7 – Kinsey	Cam Henderson Center (4,035); Huntington, WV
Sun Belt Conference regular season
December 29, 2022; 7:00 p.m., ESPN+		Appalachian State	W 79–53	12–2 (1–0)	15 – 2 tied	7 – 3 tied	9 – Taylor	Cam Henderson Center (4,816); Huntington, WV
December 31, 2022; 2:00 p.m., ESPN+		James Madison	L 66–72	12–3 (1–1)	18 – Kinsey	10 – Handlogten	7 – Kinsey	Cam Henderson Center (4,508); Huntington, WV
January 5, 2023; 7:00 p.m., ESPN+		at Georgia Southern	L 76–81	12–4 (1–2)	22 – Kinsey	12 – Handlogten	6 – 2 tied	Hanner Fieldhouse (1,009); Statesboro, GA
January 7, 2023; 3:30 p.m., ESPN+		Coastal Carolina	W 81–66	13–4 (2–2)	27 – Kinsey	19 – Handlogten	9 – Kinsey	Cam Henderson Center (4,672); Huntington, WV
January 12, 2023; 9:00 p.m., ESPN2		Southern Miss	W 89–67	14–4 (3–2)	23 – Kinsey	16 – Handlogten	9 – Curfman	Cam Henderson Center (4,321); Huntington, WV
January 14, 2023; 7:00 p.m., ESPN+		Old Dominion	W 73–65	15–4 (4–2)	24 – Kinsey	9 – Handlogten	8 – Kinsey	Cam Henderson Center (5,719); Huntington, WV
January 19, 2023; 8:00 p.m., ESPN+		at Texas State	W 81–73	16–4 (5–2)	21 – Curfman	7 – 2 tied	6 – Kinsey	Strahan Arena (3,183); San Marcos, TX
January 21, 2023; 3:00 p.m., ESPN+		at Arkansas State	W 87–78 ^{OT}	17–4 (6–2)	27 – Taylor	10 – Conner	4 – Taylor	First National Bank Arena (1,084); Jonesboro, AR
January 26, 2023; 7:00 p.m., ESPN+		Louisiana–Monroe	L 82–86 ^{2OT}	17–5 (6–3)	28 – Kinsey	14 – Handlogten	6 – Taylor	Cam Henderson Center (4,931); Huntington, WV
January 28, 2023; 7:00 p.m., ESPN+		Georgia State	W 103–65	18–5 (7–3)	20 – Taylor	5 – Fricks	10 – Kinsey	Cam Henderson Center (5,711); Huntington, WV
February 2, 2023; 6:30 p.m., ESPN+		at Appalachian State	W 66–58	19–5 (8–3)	21 – Taylor	11 – Handlogten	7 – Taylor	Holmes Center (2,685); Boone, NC
February 4, 2023; 8:00 p.m., ESPN+		at Louisiana	L 67–77	19–6 (8–4)	28 – Kinsey	8 – Handlogten	5 – Taylor	Cajundome (5,351); Lafayette, LA
February 9, 2023; 7:00 p.m., ESPN+		at Coastal Carolina	W 92–74	20–6 (9–4)	33 – Taylor	10 – Taylor	6 – Taylor	HTC Center (1,923); Conway, SC
February 11, 2023; 2:00 p.m., ESPN+		at Georgia State	W 88–77	21–6 (10–4)	37 – Kinsey	9 – Handlogten	5 – 2 tied	GSU Convocation Center (1,913); Atlanta, GA
February 16, 2023; 7:00 p.m., ESPN+		Georgia Southern	W 84–83	22–6 (11–4)	28 – Taylor	6 – Handlogten	4 – Taylor	Cam Henderson Center (5,711); Huntington, WV
February 18, 2023; 7:00 p.m., ESPN+		Troy	W 88–78	23–6 (12–4)	27 – Taylor	10 – Handlogten	6 – Taylor	Cam Henderson Center (5,711); Huntington, WV
February 22, 2023; 7:00 p.m., ESPN+		at James Madison	W 92–83	24–6 (13–4)	31 – Kinsey	9 – 2 tied	7 – Kinsey	Atlantic Union Bank Center (4,688); Harrisonburg, VA
February 24, 2023; 7:00 p.m., ESPN+		at Old Dominion	L 67–71	24–7 (13–5)	23 – Taylor	9 – Conner	5 – Kinsey	Chartway Arena (6,425); Norfolk, VA
Sun Belt Conference tournament
March 4, 2023; 6:00 p.m., ESPN+	(3)	vs. (11) Texas State; Quarterfinals	L 68–71	24–8	19 – Taylor	7 – Handlogten	6 – Kinsey	Pensacola Bay Center; Pensacola, FL
*Non-conference game. ^{#}Rankings from AP poll. (#) Tournament seedings in parentheses. All times are in Eastern Time.

== Awards and honors ==
Recipient	Award	Date	Ref.
Taevion Kinsey	SBC Player of the Week (Week 2)	Nov. 22	
Taevion Kinsey	SBC Player of the Week (Week 5)	Dec. 13	
Taevion Kinsey	SBC Player of the Week (Week 10)	Jan. 17	
Andrew Taylor	Lou Henson Award National Player of the Week	Feb. 13	
Andrew Taylor	SBC Player of the Week (Week 14)	Feb. 14	
Taevion Kinsey	SBC All-Conference First Team	Feb. 27	
Andrew Taylor	SBC All-Conference First Team	Feb. 27	
Micah Handlogten	SBC Freshman of the Year	Feb. 27	
