= 2022–23 Louisiana–Monroe Warhawks men's basketball team =

American college basketball season

2022–23 Louisiana–Monroe Warhawks men's basketball
- Conference: Sun Belt Conference
- Record: 11–21 (7–11 Sun Belt)
- Head coach: Keith Richard (13th season)
- Assistant coaches: Morris Scott; Alex Hausladen; Ronnie Dean
- Home arena: Fant–Ewing Coliseum

2022–23 Sun Belt Conference men's basketball standings
	Conf.				Overall
Team	W		L	PCT	W		L	PCT
Southern Miss	14	–	4	.778	25	–	8	.758
Louisiana †	13	–	5	.722	26	–	8	.765
Marshall	13	–	5	.722	24	–	8	.750
James Madison	12	–	6	.667	22	–	11	.667
Troy	11	–	7	.611	20	–	13	.606
Old Dominion	11	–	7	.611	19	–	12	.613
Georgia Southern	9	–	9	.500	17	–	16	.515
South Alabama	9	–	9	.500	19	–	16	.543
Appalachian State	9	–	9	.500	16	–	16	.500
Louisiana–Monroe	7	–	11	.389	11	–	21	.344
Texas State	6	–	12	.333	16	–	19	.457
Coastal Carolina	5	–	13	.278	11	–	20	.355
Arkansas State	4	–	14	.222	13	–	20	.394
Georgia State	3	–	15	.167	10	–	21	.323
† 2023 Sun Belt Tournament winner

The 2022–23 Louisiana–Monroe Warhawks men's basketball team represented the University of Louisiana at Monroe in the 2022–23 NCAA Division I men's basketball season. The Warhawks, led by 13th-year head coach Keith Richard, played their home games at Fant–Ewing Coliseum in Monroe, Louisiana as members of the Sun Belt Conference.

== Previous season ==
The Warhawks finished the 2021–22 season 13–18, 5–13 in Sun Belt play to finish in 11th place in the Sun Belt Conference. They lost to Arkansas State in the first round of the Sun Belt tournament.

== Offseason ==
=== Departures ===
Name	Number	Pos.	Height	Weight	Year	Hometown	Reason for departure
Trey Boston	0	G	6'2'	165	Sophomore	Chicago, IL	Left Team for personal reasons
Andre Jones	1	G	6'5"	191	GS Senior	Little Rock, AR	Graduated
Koreem Ozier	2	G	6'1"	190	Junior	Racine, WI	Graduated
Elijah Gonzales	3	G	5'11"	170	Junior	Clackamas, OR	Graduated
Reginald Gee	5	G	6'2"	230	GS Senior	Houston, TX	Graduated
D'Marcus Hall	14	G/F	6'5"	210	Freshman	Haughton, LA	Transferred to Bossier Parish Community College
Luke Phillips	21	F	6'10"	220	RS Sophomore	Adelaide, Australia	Signed to play semi-professionally in Australia with Cockburn Cougars
Russell Harrison	24	G/F	6'4"	200	Senior	Lubbock, TX	Graduate transferred to Lubbock Christian University

=== Incoming transfers ===
Name	Number	Pos.	Height	Weight	Year	Hometown	Previous School
Jamari Blackmon	0	G	6'1"	205	Senior	Hoover, AL	North Alabama
Savion Gallion	1	G	6'4"	182	Sophomore	Washington, D.C.	South Plains College
Devon Hancock	2	G	6'3"	190	RS Sophomore	Dallas, TX	Milwaukee
Tyreke Locure	11	G	6'0"	165	Junior	New Orleans, LA	UAB
Victor Bafutto	14	C	6'10"	230	GS Senior	Brasília, Brazil	Mercer
AD Diedhiou	34	F	6'10"	240	Junior	Dakar, Senegal	UAB

=== Recruiting classes ===
==== 2022 recruiting class ====
College recruiting information
Name	Hometown	School	Height	Weight	Commit date
Jacob Wilson; SG	Baton Rouge, LA	Liberty Magnet High School	6 ft 5 in (1.96 m)	209 lb (95 kg)	Aug 2, 2022
Jacob Wilson; SG	Recruit ratings: No ratings found				
Jalen Bolden; SG	Zachary, LA	Zachary High School	6 ft 4 in (1.93 m)	212 lb (96 kg)	Mar 14, 2022
Jalen Bolden; SG	Recruit ratings: No ratings found				
Overall recruit ranking:
Note: In many cases, Scout, Rivals, 247Sports, On3, and ESPN may conflict in their listings of height and weight.; In these cases, the average was taken. ESPN grades are on a 100-point scale.; Sources: "Louisiana–Monroe 2022-23 Basketball Commits". ESPN.; "2022-23 Team Ranking". Rivals.

==== 2023 recruiting class ====
College recruiting information (2023)
Name	Hometown	School	Height	Weight	Commit date
Kelton Williams; PG	Midloathian, TX	Midloathian High School	6 ft 1 in (1.85 m)	165 lb (75 kg)	Oct 7, 2022
Kelton Williams; PG	Recruit ratings: No ratings found				
Overall recruit ranking:
Note: In many cases, Scout, Rivals, 247Sports, On3, and ESPN may conflict in their listings of height and weight.; In these cases, the average was taken. ESPN grades are on a 100-point scale.; Sources: "Louisiana–Monroe 2023-24 Basketball Commits". ESPN.; "2023-24 Team Ranking". Rivals.

== Preseason ==
=== Preseason Sun Belt Conference poll ===
The Warhawks were picked to finish in last place in the conference's preseason poll. Junior forward Nika Metskhavarishvili was named preseason All-SBC Third Team.

Coaches poll
Predicted finish	Team (1st place Votes)
1	Louisiana - 190 (10)
2	Texas State - 162 (1)
3	South Alabama - 150 (1)
4	James Madison - 149 (1)
5	Georgia State - 127 (1)
6	Marshall - 122
7	App State - 120
8	Coastal Carolina - 100
9	Old Dominion - 93
10	Troy - 76
11	Georgia Southern - 69
12	Arkansas State - 48
13	Southern Miss - 34
14	ULM - 30

== Roster ==
2022–23 Louisiana–Monroe Warhawks men's basketball team
Players
Coaches

Pos.	#	Name	Height	Weight	Year	Hometown
G	0	Jamari Blackmon	6 ft 0 in (1.83 m)	185 lb (84 kg)	Sr	Hoover, Alabama
G	1	Savion Gallion	6 ft 4 in (1.93 m)	182 lb (83 kg)	So	Washington, D.C.
G	2	Devon Hancock	6 ft 3 in (1.91 m)	188 lb (85 kg)	So	Dallas, Texas
F	4	Nika Metskhvarishvili	6 ft 8 in (2.03 m)	225 lb (102 kg)	Jr	Tbilisi, Georgia
F	5	Jalen Bolden	6 ft 4 in (1.93 m)	212 lb (96 kg)	Fr	Zachary, Louisiana
F	10	Langston Powell	6 ft 5 in (1.96 m)	195 lb (88 kg)	GS	West Monroe, Louisiana
G	11	Tyreke Locure	6 ft 0 in (1.83 m)	167 lb (76 kg)	Jr	New Orleans, Louisiana
F	13	Thomas Howell	6 ft 8 in (2.03 m)	235 lb (107 kg)	So	Natchitoches, Louisiana
C	14	Victor Bafutto	6 ft 10 in (2.08 m)	227 lb (103 kg)	GS	Brasília, Brazil
G	15	Jacob Wilson	6 ft 5 in (1.96 m)	—	Fr	Baton Rouge, Louisiana
F	22	Edwin Litolff	6 ft 7 in (2.01 m)	184 lb (83 kg)	Fr	Livingston, Louisiana
G	23	Johnnie Williams IV	6 ft 5 in (1.96 m)	180 lb (82 kg)	So	Sarasota, Florida
C	34	AD Diedhiou	6 ft 11 in (2.11 m)	262 lb (119 kg)	Jr	Dakar, Senegal

Head coach

- Keith Richard (Louisiana–Monroe)

Assistant coach(es)

- Morris Scott (Florida A&M)
- Alex Hausladen (Arkansas)
- Ronnie Dean (Harris–Stowe State)

Legend

- (C) Team captain
- (S) Suspended
- (I) Ineligible
- (W) Walk-on
- Injured
- Current redshirt

Roster
Last update: January 20, 2023

== Schedule and results ==
Date time, TV	Rank^{#}	Opponent^{#}	Result	Record	High points	High rebounds	High assists	Site (attendance) city, state
Non-conference regular season
November 7, 2022*; 7:00 pm, SECN+		at Texas A&M	L 54–87	0–1	10 – Tied	9 – Metskhvarishvili	2 – Locure	Reed Arena (6,262); College Station, TX
November 10, 2022*; 6:30 pm, ESPN+		Dallas Christian	W 111–59	1–1	14 – Howell	10 – Metskhvarishvili	9 – Blackmon	Fant–Ewing Coliseum (538); Monroe, LA
November 14, 2022*; 6:30 pm, ESPN+		Central Baptist	W 105–56	2–1	15 – Metskhvarishvili	9 – Bafutto	4 – Tied	Fant–Ewing Coliseum (744); Monroe, LA
November 17, 2022*; 7:00 pm, ESPN+		at No. 15 TCU; Emerald Coast Classic campus-site game	L 60–95	2–2	14 – Locure	6 – Howell	1 – Tied	Schollmaier Arena (4,959); Fort Worth, TX
November 21, 2022*; 6:00 pm, CUSA.tv		at Louisiana Tech	L 58–79	2–3	18 – Locure	7 – Howell	6 – Blackmon	Thomas Assembly Center (2,214); Ruston, LA
November 25, 2022*; 1:30 pm, FloHoops		vs. Omaha; Emerald Coast Classic semifinal	L 56–63	2–4	15 – Blackmon	10 – Howell	3 – Tied	The Arena at NFSC (160); Niceville, FL
November 26, 2022*; 10:00 am, FloHoops		vs. Loyola (MD); Emerald Coast Classic	L 64–65	2–5	20 – Bafutto	8 – Bafutto	5 – Blackmon	The Arena at NFSC (100); Niceville, FL
November 28, 2022*; 6:00 pm, ESPN+		at Tulane	L 60–75	2–6	14 – Locure	11 – Howell	8 – Blackmon	Devlin Fieldhouse; New Orleans, LA
December 3, 2022*; 2:00 pm, ESPN+		Champion Christian	W 101–46	3–6	20 – Bafutto	15 – Howell	7 – Locure	Fant–Ewing Coliseum (887); Monroe, LA
December 10, 2022*; 3:30 pm, ESPN+		at Northwestern State	L 73–91	3–7	16 – Howell	10 – Bafutto	2 – Tied	Prather Coliseum (1,627); Natchitoches, LA
December 14, 2022*; 6:30 pm, ESPN+		Sam Houston	L 53–79	3–8	14 – Locure	4 – Tied	3 – Locure	Fant–Ewing Coliseum (871); Monroe, LA
December 17, 2022*; 2:00 pm, ESPN+		Lamar	W 83–59	4–8	17 – Locure	10 – Baffuto	7 – Locure	Fant–Ewing Coliseum (978); Monroe, LA
December 20, 2022*; 11:30 am, ESPN+		Jacksonville	L 55–66	4–9	12 – Howell	5 – Tied	2 – Tied	Fant–Ewing Coliseum (828); Monroe, LA
Sun Belt regular season
December 29, 2022; 7:00 pm, ESPN+		at Texas State	W 57–53	5–9 (1–0)	12 – Locure	13 – Howell	4 – Locure	Strahan Arena (1,052); San Marcos, TX
December 31, 2022; 2:00 pm, ESPN+		at Arkansas State	W 84–72	6–9 (2–0)	25 – Blackmon	9 – Bafutto	4 – Tied	First National Bank Arena (2,347); Jonesboro, AR
January 5, 2023; 6:30 pm, ESPN+		Georgia State	W 66–58	7–9 (3–0)	25 – Locure	8 – Howell	4 – Tied	Fant–Ewing Coliseum (1,208); Monroe, LA
January 7, 2023; 2:00 pm, ESPN+		Southern Miss	L 60–65	7–10 (3–1)	21 – Locure	10 – Howell	5 – Blackmon	Fant–Ewing Coliseum (1,984); Monroe, LA
January 12, 2023; 6:30 pm, ESPN+		Louisiana; 2,000th Game in NLU/ULM Program History	L 73–86	7–11 (3–2)	19 – Powell	6 – Howell	5 – Howell	Fant–Ewing Coliseum (3,568); Monroe, LA
January 14, 2023; 2:00 pm, ESPN+		Texas State	W 61–58	8–11 (4–2)	24 – Blackmon	6 – Howell	4 – Gallion	Fant–Ewing Coliseum (2,007); Monroe, LA
January 19, 2023; 6:00 pm, ESPN+		at Georgia Southern; Keith Richard's 300th Career Victory	W 72–59	9–11 (5–2)	19 – Locure	15 – Bafutto	6 – Locure	Hanner Fieldhouse (1,553); Statesboro, GA
January 21, 2023; 4:00 pm, ESPN+		at Troy	L 53–77	9–12 (5–3)	14 – Howell	8 – Bafutto	3 – Tied	Trojan Arena (3,154); Troy, AL
January 26, 2023; 6:00 pm, ESPN+		at Marshall	W 86–82 ^{2OT}	10–12 (6–3)	35 – Blackmon	15 – Howell	4 – Powell	Cam Henderson Center (4,931); Huntington, WV
January 28, 2023; 3:00 pm, ESPN+		at James Madison	L 45–58	10–13 (6–4)	10 – Bafutto	7 – Tied	3 – Locure	Atlantic Union Bank Center (6,429); Harrisonburg, VA
February 2, 2023; 6:30 pm, ESPN+		Coastal Carolina	W 83–70	11–13 (7–4)	35 – Blackmon	8 – Tied	7 – Blackmon	Fant–Ewing Coliseum (3,659); Monroe, LA
February 4, 2023; 2:00 pm, ESPN+		South Alabama	L 64–72	11–14 (7–5)	23 – Blackmon	7 – Howell	4 – Blackmon	Fant–Ewing Coliseum (3,023); Monroe, LA
February 9, 2023; 6:30 pm, ESPN+		Appalachian State	L 45–52	11–15 (7–6)	13 – Locure	16 – Howell	3 – Locure	Fant–Ewing Coliseum (3,558); Monroe, LA
February 11, 2023; 2:30 pm, ESPN+		at Southern Miss	L 67–76	11–16 (7–7)	24 – Locure	10 – Howell	5 – Blackmon	Reed Green Coliseum (4,578); Hattiesburg, MS
February 16, 2023; 7:00 pm, ESPN+		at Louisiana	L 67–84	11–17 (7–8)	16 – Howell	6 – Tied	4 – Blackmon	Cajundome (2,948); Lafayette, LA
February 18, 2023; 3:00 pm, ESPN+		at South Alabama	L 45–81	11–18 (7–9)	12 – Locure	8 – Howell	2 – Tied	Mitchell Center (1,702); Mobile, AL
February 22, 2023; 6:30 pm, ESPN+		Troy	L 78–82 ^{OT}	11–19 (7–10)	33 – Locure	9 – Howell	2 – Tied	Fant–Ewing Coliseum (962); Monroe, LA
February 24, 2023; 6:30 pm, ESPN+		Arkansas State	L 61–64	11–20 (7–11)	24 – Locure	11 – Howell	5 – Howell	Fant–Ewing Coliseum (2,286); Monroe, LA
Sun Belt tournament
March 2, 2023; 7:30 pm, ESPN+	(10)	vs. (7) Georgia Southern; Second Round	L 57–66	11–21	15 – Blackmon	11 – Howell	1 – Tied	Pensacola Bay Center (940); Pensacola, FL
*Non-conference game. ^{#}Rankings from AP Poll. (#) Tournament seedings in parentheses. All times are in Central.
