= 2022–23 James Madison Dukes men's basketball team =

American college basketball season

2022–23 James Madison Dukes men's basketball
- Conference: Sun Belt Conference
- Record: 22–11 (12–6 Sun Belt)
- Head coach: Mark Byington (3rd season)
- Assistant coaches: Xavier Joyner; Jon Cremins; Matt Bucklin
- Home arena: Atlantic Union Bank Center

2022–23 Sun Belt Conference men's basketball standings
	Conf.				Overall
Team	W		L	PCT	W		L	PCT
Southern Miss	14	–	4	.778	25	–	8	.758
Louisiana †	13	–	5	.722	26	–	8	.765
Marshall	13	–	5	.722	24	–	8	.750
James Madison	12	–	6	.667	22	–	11	.667
Troy	11	–	7	.611	20	–	13	.606
Old Dominion	11	–	7	.611	19	–	12	.613
Georgia Southern	9	–	9	.500	17	–	16	.515
South Alabama	9	–	9	.500	19	–	16	.543
Appalachian State	9	–	9	.500	16	–	16	.500
Louisiana–Monroe	7	–	11	.389	11	–	21	.344
Texas State	6	–	12	.333	16	–	19	.457
Coastal Carolina	5	–	13	.278	11	–	20	.355
Arkansas State	4	–	14	.222	13	–	20	.394
Georgia State	3	–	15	.167	10	–	21	.323
† 2023 Sun Belt Tournament winner

The 2022–23 James Madison Dukes men's basketball team represented James Madison University in the 2022–23 NCAA Division I men's basketball season. The Dukes, led by third-year head coach Mark Byington, played their home games at the Atlantic Union Bank Center in Harrisonburg, Virginia as members of the Sun Belt Conference.

The season marks the Dukes' first season in the Sun Belt Conference as they had previously been members of the Colonial Athletic Association.

== Previous season ==
During the 2021–22 season, the Dukes competed in the Colonial Athletic Association, of which they had been a member since the conference was founded in 1979. They completed the season at 15–14 overall and 6–12 in CAA play to finish in eighth place.

On November 6, 2021, the school announced that it would leave the CAA to join the Sun Belt Conference effective June 30, 2022. In response to their announced move to the Sun Belt Conference, the Dukes were banned by the CAA from competing in the CAA Tournament.

== Offseason ==
=== Departures ===
Name	Number	Pos.	Height	Weight	Year	Hometown	Reason for departure
Devon Savage	1	G	6'4"	190	Freshman	Washington, D.C.	Transferred to Merrimack
Jaylen Stinson	2	G	6'0"	170	Freshman	Philadelphia, PA	Transferred to Merrimack
Andrew McConnell	3	G	6'0"	170	Freshman	Buford, GA	Transferred to USC Upstate
Charles Falden	11	G	6'3"	210	GS Senior	Richmond, VA	Graduated
Jalen Hodge	13	G	6'1"	180	RS Junior	O'Fallon, IL	Transferred to SIU Edwardsville

=== Incoming transfers ===
Name	Number	Pos.	Height	Weight	Year	Hometown	Previous school
Noah Freidel	1	G	6'4"	200	Junior	Tea, SD	South Dakota State
Mezie Offurum	13	F	6'8"	230	GS Senior	Germantown, MD	Mount St. Mary's

=== Recruiting ===
College recruiting information
Name	Hometown	School	Height	Weight	Commit date
Jerrell Roberson; PF	Hyattsville, MD	DeMatha Catholic High School	6 ft 8 in (2.03 m)	205 lb (93 kg)	Sep 10, 2021
Jerrell Roberson; PF	Recruit ratings: Rivals:				
Xavier Brown; PG	Williamsburg, VA	Jamestown High School	6 ft 2 in (1.88 m)	170 lb (77 kg)	May 1, 2022
Xavier Brown; PG	Recruit ratings: No ratings found				
Brycen Blaine; SG	Lilburn, GA	Berkmar High School	6 ft 5 in (1.96 m)	195 lb (88 kg)	May 1, 2022
Brycen Blaine; SG	Recruit ratings: No ratings found				
Overall recruit ranking:
Note: In many cases, Scout, Rivals, 247Sports, On3, and ESPN may conflict in their listings of height and weight.; In these cases, the average was taken. ESPN grades are on a 100-point scale.; Sources: "2022 Team Ranking". Rivals.

=== Recruiting class of 2023 ===
College recruiting information (2023)
Name	Hometown	School	Height	Weight	Commit date
Tyshawn Archie; CG	Houston, TX	C.E. King High School	6 ft 1 in (1.85 m)	160 lb (73 kg)	Oct 7, 2022
Tyshawn Archie; CG	Recruit ratings: No ratings found				
Overall recruit ranking:
Note: In many cases, Scout, Rivals, 247Sports, On3, and ESPN may conflict in their listings of height and weight.; In these cases, the average was taken. ESPN grades are on a 100-point scale.; Sources: "2023 Team Ranking". Rivals.

== Preseason ==
=== Preseason Sun Belt Conference poll ===
In the conference's preseason coaches poll, the Dukes were picked to finish fourth, but were one of four schools to receive first place votes. Additionally, senior guard Vado Morse was named to the preseason All-Conference First Team.

Coaches poll
Predicted finish	Team (1st place Votes)
1	Louisiana - 190 (10)
2	Texas State - 162 (1)
3	South Alabama - 150 (1)
4	James Madison - 149 (1)
5	Georgia State - 127 (1)
6	Marshall - 122
7	App State - 120
8	Coastal Carolina - 100
9	Old Dominion - 93
10	Troy - 76
11	Georgia Southern - 69
12	Arkansas State - 48
13	Southern Miss - 34
14	ULM - 30

== Roster ==
2022–23 James Madison Dukes men's basketball team
Players
Coaches

Pos.	#	Name	Height	Weight	Year	Previous school	Hometown
G	0	Xavier Brown	6 ft 2 in (1.88 m)	170 lb (77 kg)	Fr	Jamestown HS	Williamsburg, VA
G	1	Noah Freidel	6 ft 4 in (1.93 m)	210 lb (95 kg)	RS Jr	South Dakota State	Tea, SD
G	2	Tyree Ihenacho	6 ft 4 in (1.93 m)	195 lb (88 kg)	RS So	North Dakota	Prior Lake, MN
G	4	Vado Morse	6 ft 0 in (1.83 m)	170 lb (77 kg)	RS Sr	Mount St. Mary's	Suitland, MD
G/F	5	Terrence Edwards Jr.	6 ft 6 in (1.98 m)	190 lb (86 kg)	RS So	Tucker HS	Atlanta, GA
G	10	Terell Strickland	6 ft 0 in (1.83 m)	175 lb (79 kg)	RS So	Scotland Campus Sports	Tampa, FL
F	11	Justin Amadi	6 ft 7 in (2.01 m)	220 lb (100 kg)	RS So	Paul M. Dorman HS	Greenville, SC
G	12	Brycen Blaine	6 ft 5 in (1.96 m)	195 lb (88 kg)	Fr	Berkmar HS	Richmond, VA
G	13	Mezie Offurum	6 ft 8 in (2.03 m)	230 lb (104 kg)	GS	Mount St. Mary's	Germantown, MD
G	15	Takal Molson	6 ft 4 in (1.93 m)	210 lb (95 kg)	GS	Seton Hall	Buffalo, NY
G	20	Dylan Hamrick (W)	6 ft 0 in (1.83 m)	170 lb (77 kg)	Jr	Central HS	Strasburg, VA
G	21	Hollman Smith (W)	6 ft 0 in (1.83 m)	185 lb (84 kg)	RS So	Tilton School	Falls Church, VA
F	22	Julien Wooden	6 ft 8 in (2.03 m)	225 lb (102 kg)	RS Jr	Northside HS	Roanoke, VA
F	25	Alonzo Sule	6 ft 7 in (2.01 m)	225 lb (102 kg)	GS	Texas State	Houston, TX
G	33	Jerrell Roberson	6 ft 9 in (2.06 m)	225 lb (102 kg)	Fr	DeMatha HS	Upper Marlboro, MD
F	35	Shane Feden (W)	6 ft 6 in (1.98 m)	175 lb (79 kg)	So	Woodbridge HS	Woodbridge, VA

Head coach

- Mark Byington (UNC Wilmington)

Assistant coach(es)

- Xavier Joyner (Husson)
- Jon Cremins (Valdosta State)
- Matt Bucklin (Georgia)

Legend

- (C) Team captain
- (S) Suspended
- (I) Ineligible
- (W) Walk-on
- Injured
- Current redshirt

Roster
Last update: October 21, 2022

== Schedule and results ==
Date time, TV	Rank^{#}	Opponent^{#}	Result	Record	High points	High rebounds	High assists	Site (attendance) city, state
Non-conference regular season
November 7, 2022*; 4:00 pm, ESPN+		Valley Forge	W 123–38	1–0	17 – Freidel	11 – Roberson	5 – Blaine	Atlantic Union Bank Center (3,148); Harrisonburg, VA
November 9, 2022*; 7:00 pm, ESPN+		Hampton	W 106–58	2–0	21 – Edwards	11 – Edwards	7 – Brown	Atlantic Union Bank Center (3,768); Harrisonburg, VA
November 12, 2022*; 1:00 pm, ESPN+		at Buffalo	W 97–62	3–0	22 – Morse	7 – Sule	4 – Morse	Alumni Arena (1,949); Buffalo, NY
November 15, 2022*; 7:00 pm		at Howard	W 95–69	4–0	23 – Freidel	6 – Tied	3 – Tied	Burr Gymnasium (889); Washington, D.C.
November 20, 2022*; 12:00 pm, ACCN		at No. 1 North Carolina	L 64–80	4–1	19 – Molson	8 – Offurum	3 – Offurum	Dean Smith Center (19,942); Chapel Hill, NC
November 25, 2022*; 11:00 am		vs. Coastal Georgia	W 100–54	5–1	17 – Brown	7 – Tied	4 – Wooden	Enmarket Arena (247); Savannah, GA
November 26, 2022*; 12:00 pm		vs. South Dakota State; Hostilo Hoops Community Classic	W 79–60	6–1	13 – Freidel	7 – Sule	2 – Tied	Enmarket Arena (276); Savannah, GA
November 27, 2022*; 12:00 pm		vs. Valparaiso; Hostilo Hoops Community Classic	L 79–81 ^{OT}	6–2	21 – Edwards	6 – Edwards	2 – Tied	Enmarket Arena (188); Savannah, GA
December 2, 2022*; 7:00 pm, ESPN+		Eastern Kentucky	W 97–80	7–2	17 – Tied	7 – Offurum	4 – Edwards	Atlantic Union Bank Center (4,303); Harrisonburg, VA
December 6, 2022*; 8:00 pm, ACCN		at No. 3 Virginia	L 50–55	7–3	20 – Molson	6 – Tied	3 – Morse	John Paul Jones Arena (14,193); Charlottesville, VA
December 10, 2022*; 7:00 pm, ESPN+		Gallaudet	W 106–43	8–3	22 – Morse	11 – Sule	7 – Molson	Atlantic Union Bank Center (3,642); Harrisonburg, VA
December 18, 2022*; 2:00 pm, ESPN+		Long Island	W 115–79	9–3	18 – Wooden	6 – Sule	8 – Strickland	Atlantic Union Bank Center (2,785); Harrisonburg, VA
December 21, 2022*; 11:00 am		at Coppin State	L 100–107 ^{2OT}	9–4	21 – Sule	10 – Molson	4 – Morse	Physical Education Complex (3,378); Baltimore, MD
Sun Belt Conference regular season
December 29, 2022; 7:00 pm, ESPN+		at Georgia State	W 63–47	10–4 (1–0)	15 – Ihenacho	8 – Tied	2 – Tied	GSU Convocation Center (1,878); Atlanta, GA
December 31, 2022; 2:00 pm, ESPN+		at Marshall	W 72–66	11–4 (2–0)	16 – Edwards	6 – Edwards	4 – Edwards	Cam Henderson Center (4,508); Huntington, WV
January 5, 2023; 7:00 pm, ESPN+		Texas State	L 62–63	11–5 (2–1)	19 – Offurum	7 – Wooden	5 – Ihenacho	Atlantic Union Bank Center (3,068); Harrisonburg, VA
January 7, 2023; 8:00 pm, ESPNU		Appalachian State	L 62–71	11–6 (2–2)	17 – Edwards	6 – Tied	3 – Tied	Atlantic Union Bank Center (3,540); Harrisonburg, VA
January 12, 2023; 7:00 pm, ESPN+		at South Alabama	L 62–63	11–7 (2–3)	20 – Edwards	8 – Offurum	3 – Molson	Mitchell Center (1,725); Mobile, AL
January 14, 2023; 7:00 pm, ESPN+		Georgia Southern	W 83–71	12–7 (3–3)	25 – Morse	6 – Molson	3 – Morse	Atlantic Union Bank Center (3,787); Harrisonburg, VA
January 19, 2023; 7:00 pm, ESPN+		at Troy	W 89–87	13–7 (4–3)	25 – Morse	9 – Edwards	3 – Edwards	Trojan Arena (2,953); Troy, AL
January 21, 2023; 3:00 pm, ESPN+		at Southern Miss	L 70–83	13–8 (4–4)	18 – Edwards	8 – Edwards	5 – Molson	Reed Green Coliseum (4,318); Hattiesburg, MS
January 26, 2023; 7:00 pm, ESPN+		Coastal Carolina	W 75–69	14–8 (5–4)	15 – Morse	9 – Molson	3 – Molson	Atlantic Union Bank Center (5,609); Harrisonburg, VA
January 28, 2023; 4:00 pm, ESPN+		Louisiana–Monroe	W 58–45	15–8 (6–4)	15 – Offurum	14 – Molson	3 – Molson	Atlantic Union Bank Center (6,429); Harrisonburg, VA
February 2, 2023; 7:00 pm, ESPN+		at Old Dominion; Royal Rivalry	W 78–73	16–8 (7–4)	18 – Molson	7 – Edwards	9 – Molson	Chartway Arena (7,691); Norfolk, VA
February 4, 2023; 4:00 pm, ESPN+		at Appalachian State	W 63–57	17–8 (8–4)	16 – Molson	10 – Freidel	3 – Tied	Holmes Center (3,870); Boone, NC
February 9, 2023; 7:00 pm, ESPN+		at Georgia Southern	L 73–76	17–9 (8–5)	16 – Edwards	9 – Edwards	6 – Ihenacho	Hanner Fieldhouse (1,863); Statesboro, GA
February 11, 2023; 2:00 pm, ESPN+		at Coastal Carolina	W 73–66	18–9 (9–5)	16 – Edwards	10 – Offurum	6 – Ihenacho	HTC Center (1,578); Conway, SC
February 16, 2023; 7:00 pm, ESPN+		Old Dominion; Royal Rivalry	W 76–67	19–9 (10–5)	18 – Offurum	7 – Offurum	5 – Offurum	Atlantic Union Bank Center (4,829); Harrisonburg, VA
February 18, 2023; 7:00 pm, ESPN+		Louisiana	W 74–68	20–9 (11–5)	24 – Morse	7 – Offurum	4 – Morse	Atlantic Union Bank Center (5,668); Harrisonburg, VA
February 22, 2023; 7:00 pm, ESPN+		Marshall	L 83–92	20–10 (11–6)	26 – Edwards	11 – Edwards	6 – Molson	Atlantic Union Bank Center (4,688); Harrisonburg, VA
February 24, 2023; 8:00 pm, ESPN+		Georgia State	W 90–69	21–10 (12–6)	19 – Morse	12 – Sule	4 – Morse	Atlantic Union Bank Center (5,019); Harrisonburg, VA
Sun Belt Conference tournament
March 4, 2023; 2:00 pm, ESPN+	(4)	vs. (5) Troy; Quarterfinals	W 75–72	22–10	27 – Edwards	12 – Edwards	4 – Molson	Pensacola Bay Center; Pensacola, FL
March 5, 2023; 5:00 pm, ESPN+	(4)	vs. (8) South Alabama; Semifinals	L 66–75	22–11	20 – Offurum	9 – Molson	1 – Tied	Pensacola Bay Center; Pensacola, FL
*Non-conference game. ^{#}Rankings from AP Poll. (#) Tournament seedings in parentheses. All times are in Eastern.
