= 2022–23 Appalachian State Mountaineers men's basketball team =

American college basketball season

2022–23 Appalachian State Mountaineers men's basketball
- Conference: Sun Belt Conference
- Record: 16–16 (9–9 Sun Belt)
- Head coach: Dustin Kerns (4th season)
- Assistant coaches: Patrick Moynihan; Bob Szorc; Frank Young
- Home arena: Holmes Center

2022–23 Sun Belt Conference men's basketball standings
	Conf.				Overall
Team	W		L	PCT	W		L	PCT
Southern Miss	14	–	4	.778	25	–	8	.758
Louisiana †	13	–	5	.722	26	–	8	.765
Marshall	13	–	5	.722	24	–	8	.750
James Madison	12	–	6	.667	22	–	11	.667
Troy	11	–	7	.611	20	–	13	.606
Old Dominion	11	–	7	.611	19	–	12	.613
Georgia Southern	9	–	9	.500	17	–	16	.515
South Alabama	9	–	9	.500	19	–	16	.543
Appalachian State	9	–	9	.500	16	–	16	.500
Louisiana–Monroe	7	–	11	.389	11	–	21	.344
Texas State	6	–	12	.333	16	–	19	.457
Coastal Carolina	5	–	13	.278	11	–	20	.355
Arkansas State	4	–	14	.222	13	–	20	.394
Georgia State	3	–	15	.167	10	–	21	.323
† 2023 Sun Belt Tournament winner

The 2022–23 Appalachian State Mountaineers men's basketball team represented Appalachian State University in the 2022–23 NCAA Division I men's basketball season. The Mountaineers, led by fourth-year head coach Dustin Kerns, played their home games at the Holmes Center in Boone, North Carolina as members in the Sun Belt Conference.

The Mountaineers finished the season 16–16, 9–9 in Sun Belt play, to finish in a three-way tie for seventh place. They lost to South Alabama in the first round of the Sun Belt tournament.

== Previous season ==
The Mountaineers finished the 2021–22 season 19–15, 12–6 in Sun Belt play, to finish in second place. They defeated Georgia Southern in the quarterfinals of the Sun Belt tournament before losing to Georgia State in the semifinals. The Mountaineers received an invitation to The Basketball Classic postseason tournament, formerly known as the CollegeInsider.com Tournament. There they lost in the first round to USC Upstate.

== Offseason ==
=== Departures ===
Name	Number	Pos.	Height	Weight	Year	Hometown	Reason for departure
Justin Forrest	1	G	6' 2"	195	Senior	Decatur, GA	Graduated
R. J. Duhart	4	F	6' 9"	205	Junior	Boynton Beach, FL	Transferred to Charleston Southern
Michael Almonacy	5	G	6' 0"	180	GS Senior	Brentwood, NY	Graduated
Adrian Delph	20	G	6' 3"	185	Senior	Gastonia, NC	Graduated/went undrafted in the 2022 NBA draft
Michael Moore	24	G	6' 5"	200	Freshman	Bear Creek, NC	Walk-on; left the team for personal reasons
James Lewis Jr.	25	F	6' 8"	215	Senior	Mount Holly, NC	Graduated
Sasha Glushkov	33	C	6' 11"	205	Sophomore	Vladivostok, Russia	Transferred to Southwest Baptist

=== Incoming transfers ===
Name	Number	Pos.	Height	Weight	Year	Hometown	Previous school
Tamell Pearson	3	F	6' 10"	223	Senior	Chicago, IL	Western Illinois
Carvell Teasett	12	G	6' 1"	180	Sophomore	Baton Rouge, LA	Northwestern State
Tyree Boykin	30	G	6' 1"	190	GS Senior	Clarksville, TN	Union (TN)
Dibaji Walker	35	F	6' 9"	200	GS Senior	Columbus, OH	UMass

=== 2022 recruiting class ===
College recruiting information
Name	Hometown	School	Height	Weight	Commit date
Zocko Littleton #37 SG	Albany, GA	Osborne High School	6 ft 2 in (1.88 m)	185 lb (84 kg)	Oct 29, 2021
Zocko Littleton #37 SG	Recruit ratings: Scout: 247Sports: ESPN: (82)				
Justin Abson; PF	Pompano Beach, FL	North Broward Prep	6 ft 9 in (2.06 m)	235 lb (107 kg)	Jan 24, 2022
Justin Abson; PF	Recruit ratings: No ratings found				
Overall recruit ranking:
Note: In many cases, Scout, Rivals, 247Sports, On3, and ESPN may conflict in their listings of height and weight.; In these cases, the average was taken. ESPN grades are on a 100-point scale.; Sources: "2022 Team Ranking". Rivals.

=== 2023 recruiting class ===
College recruiting information (2023)
Name	Hometown	School	Height	Weight	Commit date
Joshua Hayes; PF	Gainesville, FL	The Rock School	6 ft 9 in (2.06 m)	220 lb (100 kg)	Sep 19, 2022
Joshua Hayes; PF	Recruit ratings: No ratings found				
Etienne Strothers; PG	Newport News, VA	Menchville High School	6 ft 2 in (1.88 m)	160 lb (73 kg)	Aug 23, 2022
Etienne Strothers; PG	Recruit ratings: No ratings found				
Overall recruit ranking:
Note: In many cases, Scout, Rivals, 247Sports, On3, and ESPN may conflict in their listings of height and weight.; In these cases, the average was taken. ESPN grades are on a 100-point scale.; Sources: "2023 Team Ranking". Rivals.

== Preseason ==
=== Preseason Sun Belt Conference poll ===
The Mountaineers were picked to finish in seventh place in the conference's preseason poll. Senior forward Donovan Gregory was named preseason All-SBC Second Team.

Coaches poll
Predicted finish	Team (1st-place votes)
1	Louisiana – 190 (10)
2	Texas State – 162 (1)
3	South Alabama – 150 (1)
4	James Madison – 149 (1)
5	Georgia State – 127 (1)
6	Marshall – 122
7	App State – 120
8	Coastal Carolina – 100
9	Old Dominion – 93
10	Troy – 76
11	Georgia Southern – 69
12	Arkansas State – 48
13	Southern Miss – 34
14	ULM – 30

== Roster ==
2022–23 Appalachian State Mountaineers men's basketball team
Players
Coaches

Pos.	#	Name	Height	Weight	Year	Previous school	Hometown
G	0	Xavion Brown	6 ft 3 in (1.91 m)	180 lb (82 kg)	Jr	Sheldon	Sacramento, CA
F	2	Christopher Mantis	6 ft 7 in (2.01 m)	185 lb (84 kg)	So	Lowell	Lowell, IN
F	3	Tamell Pearson	6 ft 10 in (2.08 m)	223 lb (101 kg)	GS	Western Illinois	Chicago, IL
G	4	Zocko Jr. Littleton	6 ft 3 in (1.91 m)	175 lb (79 kg)	Fr	Osborne	Albany, GA
G	5	Andrew Muse (W)	6 ft 2 in (1.88 m)	180 lb (82 kg)	Sr	Mount Tabor	Winston-Salem, NC
G	10	Michael Jr. Eads	6 ft 4 in (1.93 m)	200 lb (91 kg)	Jr	Edgehwater	Orlando, FL
F	11	Donovan Gregory	6 ft 5 in (1.96 m)	190 lb (86 kg)	Sr	Carmel Christian School	Charlotte, NC
G	12	Carvell Teasett	6 ft 1 in (1.85 m)	180 lb (82 kg)	So	Northwestern State	Baton Rouge, LA
G	14	Bryant Greene (W)	6 ft 1 in (1.85 m)	175 lb (79 kg)	Jr	Watauga	Boone, NC
F	15	C. J. Huntley	6 ft 10 in (2.08 m)	221 lb (100 kg)	Jr	Davidson Day School	Huntersville, NC
F	21	Justin Abson	6 ft 9 in (2.06 m)	235 lb (107 kg)	Fr	North Broward Prep	Pompano Beach, FL
G	23	Terence Harcum	6 ft 3 in (1.91 m)	190 lb (86 kg)	So	Granville Central	Butner, NC
F	24	Quinn Hafner (W)	6 ft 3 in (1.91 m)	170 lb (77 kg)	Fr	Centerville	Centerville, OH
G	30	Tyree Boykin	6 ft 1 in (1.85 m)	190 lb (86 kg)	GS	Union (TN)	Clarksville, TN
F	35	Dibaji Walker	6 ft 9 in (2.06 m)	200 lb (91 kg)	GS	UMass	Columbus, OH

Head coach

- Dustin Kerns (Clemson)

Assistant coach(es)

- Patrick Moynihan (North Georgia)
- Bob Szorc (St. John's)
- Frank Young (West Virginia)

Legend

- (C) Team captain
- (S) Suspended
- (I) Ineligible
- (W) Walk-on
- Injured
- Current redshirt

Roster
Last update: September 23, 2025

== Schedule and results ==
Date time, TV	Rank^{#}	Opponent^{#}	Result	Record	High points	High rebounds	High assists	Site (attendance) city, state
Non-conference regular season
November 7, 2022*; 6:30 p.m., ESPN+		Warren Wilson	W 142–74	1–0	22 – Mantis	7 – Walker	5 – Gregory	Holmes Center (1,944); Boone, NC
November 10, 2022*; 6:30 p.m., ESPN+		North Carolina Central	W 79–74 ^{OT}	2–0	20 – Boykin	9 – Huntley	5 – Gregory	Holmes Center (2,145); Boone, NC
November 15, 2022*; 6:00 p.m., ACCN		at Louisville	W 61–60	3–0	16 – Gregory	9 – Pearson	2 – 2 tied	KFC Yum! Center (11,919); Louisville, KY
November 18, 2022*; 7:00 p.m., ESPN+		Campbell; Appalachian State Multi-Team Event	L 58–63	3–1	21 – Gregory	7 – 3 tied	4 – Gregory	Holmes Center (2,856); Boone, NC
November 19, 2022*; 7:00 p.m., ESPN+		Kennesaw State; Appalachian State Multi-Team Event	L 67–71	3–2	13 – 2 tied	8 – Abson	6 – Gregory	Holmes Center (2,603); Boone, NC
November 20, 2022*; 2:30 p.m., ESPN+		Southeastern Louisiana; Appalachian State Multi-Team Event	W 83–74	4–2	17 – Walker	8 – 2 tied	7 – Walker	Holmes Center (1,553); Boone, NC
November 23, 2022*; 7:00 p.m.		at East Tennessee State	W 74–70	5–2	14 – Gregory	7 – Abson	3 – 3 tied	Freedom Hall Civic Center (3,825); Johnson City, TN
November 29, 2022*; 6:30 p.m., ESPN+		Furman	L 61–65	5–3	12 – Gregory	7 – 2 tied	2 – Gregory	Holmes Center (1,976); Boone, NC
December 2, 2022*; 7:00 p.m., ESPN+		at Charlotte	L 62–71	5–4	25 – Mantis	9 – Gregory	7 – Gregory	Dale F. Halton Arena (5,148); Charlotte, NC
December 6, 2022*; 6:30 p.m., ESPN+		Carlow	W 103–43	6–4	12 – 2 tied	8 – Huntley	5 – 2 tied	Holmes Center (1,622); Boone, NC
December 14, 2022*; 7:00 p.m., ACCN		at Wake Forest	L 66–67	6–5	18 – Mantis	10 – Huntley	10 – Walker	LJVM Coliseum (7,781); Winston-Salem, NC
December 17, 2022*; 4:00 p.m., ESPN+		Regent	W 100–32	7–5	17 – Mantis	12 – Pearson	3 – Brown	Holmes Center (1,394); Boone, NC
December 21, 2022*; 6:00 p.m., ESPN+		vs. UC Santa Barbara; Jerry Colangelo Classic	L 50–61	7–6	14 – Boykin	9 – Huntley	4 – Gregory	Footprint Center (2,870); Phoenix, AZ
Sun Belt Conference regular season
December 29, 2022; 7:00 p.m., ESPN+		at Marshall	L 53–79	7–7 (0–1)	20 – Boykin	6 – Huntley	2 – Gregory	Cam Henderson Center (4,816); Huntington, WV
December 31, 2022; 3:00 p.m., ESPN+		at Southern Miss	L 70–76	7–8 (0–2)	13 – Mantis	7 – Huntley	4 – Brown	Reed Green Coliseum (3,192); Hattiesburg, MS
January 5, 2023; 6:30 p.m., ESPN+		Coastal Carolina	W 63–62	8–8 (1–2)	16 – Boykin	6 – Harcum	9 – Gregory	Holmes Center (1,819); Boone, NC
January 7, 2023; 8:00 p.m., ESPNU		at James Madison	W 71–62	9–8 (2–2)	16 – Harcum	8 – Huntley	9 – Gregory	Atlantic Union Bank Center (3,540); Harrisonburg, VA
January 12, 2023; 6:30 p.m., ESPN+		Georgia Southern	L 65–67	9–9 (2–3)	21 – Gregory	7 – Huntley	4 – 2 tied	Holmes Center (1,651); Boone, NC
January 14, 2023; 4:00 p.m., ESPN+		Troy	W 58–45	10–9 (3–3)	15 – Harcum	8 – Abson	3 – Brown	Holmes Center (2,377); Boone, NC
January 19, 2023; 7:00 p.m., ESPN+		at Coastal Carolina	L 84–93 ^{OT}	10–10 (3–4)	27 – Walker	9 – Huntley	9 – Gregory	HTC Center (2,143); Conway, SC
January 21, 2023; 7:00 p.m., ESPN+		at Old Dominion	W 72–58	11–10 (4–4)	28 – Harcum	7 – Harcum	6 – Brown	Chartway Arena (5,954); Norfolk, VA
January 26, 2023; 6:30 p.m., ESPN+		Georgia State	W 71–59	12–10 (5–4)	21 – Harcum	8 – Brown	4 – Harcum	Holmes Center (2,559); Boone, NC
January 28, 2023; 4:30 p.m., ESPN+		Arkansas State	W 63–51	13–10 (6—4)	15 – Harcum	9 – Huntley	4 – 2 tied	Holmes Center (3,487); Boone, NC
February 2, 2023; 6:30 p.m., ESPN+		Marshall	L 58–66	13–11 (6–5)	14 – Harcum	7 – Huntley	6 – Gregory	Holmes Center (2,685); Boone, NC
February 4, 2023; 4:00 p.m., ESPN+		James Madison	L 57–63	13–12 (6–6)	21 – Gregory	11 – Abson	5 – Brown	Holmes Center (3,870); Boone, NC
February 9, 2023; 7:30 p.m., ESPN+		at Louisiana–Monroe	W 52–45	14–12 (7–6)	11 – Huntley	10 – Abson	6 – Gregory	Fant–Ewing Coliseum (3,558); Monroe, LA
February 11, 2023; 6:00 p.m., ESPN+		at South Alabama	L 57–74	14–13 (7–7)	14 – Gregory	5 – Pearson	4 – Gregory	Mitchell Center (1,955); Mobile, AL
February 16, 2023; 6:30 p.m., ESPN+		Texas State	W 82–75	15–13 (8–7)	21 – Gregory	6 – 2 tied	5 – Brown	Holmes Center (2,205); Boone, NC
February 18, 2023; 4:00 p.m., ESPN+		Old Dominion	L 63–74	15–14 (8–8)	14 – Gregory	7 – Abson	4 – Gregory	Holmes Center (3,651); Boone, NC
February 22, 2023; 7:00 p.m., ESPN+		at Georgia State	W 78–52	16–14 (9–8)	22 – Mantis	6 – 2 tied	6 – Brown	GSU Convocation Center (1,850); Atlanta, GA
February 24, 2023; 7:00 p.m., ESPN+		at Georgia Southern	L 64–73	16–15 (9–9)	14 – Huntley	7 – Abson	5 – Gregory	Hanner Fieldhouse (2,445); Statesboro, GA
Sun Belt tournament
March 2, 2023; 12:30 p.m., ESPN+	(9)	vs. (8) South Alabama; Second round	L 61–68	16–16	17 – Harcum	13 – Abson	5 – Brown	Pensacola Bay Center (718); Pensacola, FL
*Non-conference game. ^{#}Rankings from AP poll. (#) Tournament seedings in parentheses. All times are in Eastern.
