= 2022–23 Old Dominion Monarchs men's basketball team =

American college basketball season

2022–23 Old Dominion Monarchs men's basketball
- Conference: Sun Belt Conference
- Record: 19–12 (11–7 Sun Belt)
- Head coach: Jeff Jones (10th season)
- Assistant coaches: Chris Kovensky; Jamal Robinson; Jordan Brooks
- Home arena: Chartway Arena

2022–23 Sun Belt Conference men's basketball standings
	Conf.				Overall
Team	W		L	PCT	W		L	PCT
Southern Miss	14	–	4	.778	25	–	8	.758
Louisiana †	13	–	5	.722	26	–	8	.765
Marshall	13	–	5	.722	24	–	8	.750
James Madison	12	–	6	.667	22	–	11	.667
Troy	11	–	7	.611	20	–	13	.606
Old Dominion	11	–	7	.611	19	–	12	.613
Georgia Southern	9	–	9	.500	17	–	16	.515
South Alabama	9	–	9	.500	19	–	16	.543
Appalachian State	9	–	9	.500	16	–	16	.500
Louisiana–Monroe	7	–	11	.389	11	–	21	.344
Texas State	6	–	12	.333	16	–	19	.457
Coastal Carolina	5	–	13	.278	11	–	20	.355
Arkansas State	4	–	14	.222	13	–	20	.394
Georgia State	3	–	15	.167	10	–	21	.323
† 2023 Sun Belt Tournament winner

The 2022–23 Old Dominion Monarchs men's basketball team represented Old Dominion University in the 2022–23 NCAA Division I men's basketball season. The Monarchs, led by 10th-year head coach Jeff Jones, played their home games at Chartway Arena in Norfolk, Virginia as first-year members of the Sun Belt Conference.

== Previous season ==
The Monarchs finished the 2021–22 season 13–19, 8–10 in C-USA play to finish in fifth place in the East division. They lost to UTEP in the second round of the C-USA tournament.

On October 27, 2021, Old Dominion announced that the season would be the last for the team in Conference USA and that they would join the Sun Belt Conference on July 1, 2022.

== Offseason ==
=== Departures ===
Name	Number	Pos.	Height	Weight	Year	Hometown	Reason for departure
Brady O'Connell	2	G	6'7"	190	Sophomore	Milton, GA	Transferred to Drury
A.J. Oliver II	11	G	6'5"	200	RS Senior	Birmingham, AL	Graduate transferred
Jaylin Hunter	12	G	5'11"	195	Junior	Manchester, CT	Transferred to Ohio
Stephan Morris	20	F	6'7"	220	Junior	Houston, TX	Transferred to Virginia State
Kalu Ezikpe	22	F	6'8"	235	Senior	Lawrenceville, GA	Graduate transferred to Cincinnati
Austin Trice	23	F	6'7"	235	RS Senior	Chicago, IL	Graduated
C.J. Keyser	25	G	6'3"	190	RS Senior	Baltimore, MD	Graduated

=== Incoming transfers ===
Name	Number	Pos.	Height	Weight	Year	Hometown	Previous School
Chaunce Jenkins	2	G	6'4"	175	Sophomore	Newport News, VA	Wichita State
Tyreek Scott-Grayson	11	G	6'5"	180	GS Senior	Brick, NJ	Northeastern
Ben Stanley	12	F	6'6"	225	GS Senior	Baltimore, MD	Xavier
Trevion Brown	15	G	6'2"	173	RS Senior	Tacoma, WA	Drexel
Dericko Williams	23	F	6'8"	220	RS Junior	Kinston, NC	Tallahassee CC
Faizon Fields	25	F	6'10"	225	RS Sophomore	Cedar Rapids, IA	Chipola College

=== Recruiting classes ===
==== 2022 recruiting class ====
College recruiting
Name	Hometown	School	Height	Weight	Commit date
Bryce Baker; SG	Mooresville, NC	Donda Academy	6 ft 5 in (1.96 m)	194 lb (88 kg)	Sep 7, 2021
Bryce Baker; SG	Recruit ratings: No ratings found				
Overall recruit ranking:
Note: In many cases, Scout, Rivals, 247Sports, On3, and ESPN may conflict in their listings of height and weight.; In these cases, the average was taken. ESPN grades are on a 100-point scale.; Sources: "Old Dominion 2022 Player Commits". ESPN.; "2022 Team Ranking". Rivals.

==== 2023 recruiting class ====
College recruiting (2023)
Name	Hometown	School	Height	Weight	Commit date
Daniel Pounds; PF	Forest Park, GA	SPIRE Institute	6 ft 7 in (2.01 m)	200 lb (91 kg)	Sep 12, 2022
Daniel Pounds; PF	Recruit ratings: No ratings found				
Overall recruit ranking:
Note: In many cases, Scout, Rivals, 247Sports, On3, and ESPN may conflict in their listings of height and weight.; In these cases, the average was taken. ESPN grades are on a 100-point scale.; Sources: "Old Dominion 2023 Player Commits". ESPN.; "2023 Team Ranking". Rivals.

== Preseason ==
=== Preseason Sun Belt Conference poll ===
Old Dominion was picked to finish ninth in the Sun Belt Conference Preseason Poll voted on by all 14 head coaches in the league. The poll was released on October 17, 2022. No players were listed among the Sun Belt Conference Preseason Team.

Coaches poll
Predicted finish	Team (1st place Votes)
1	Louisiana - 190 (10)
2	Texas State - 162 (1)
3	South Alabama - 150 (1)
4	James Madison - 149 (1)
5	Georgia State - 127 (1)
6	Marshall - 122
7	App State - 120
8	Coastal Carolina - 100
9	Old Dominion - 93
10	Troy - 76
11	Georgia Southern - 69
12	Arkansas State - 48
13	Southern Miss - 34
14	ULM - 30

== Roster ==
2022–23 Old Dominion Monarchs men's basketball team
Players
Coaches

Pos.	#	Name	Height	Weight	Year	Previous school	Hometown
G	0	Mekhi Long	6 ft 7 in (2.01 m)	200 lb (91 kg)	Jr	Rhode Island	Bryans Road, Maryland
G	1	Jason Wade	6 ft 4 in (1.93 m)	244 lb (111 kg)	RS Jr	Trinity Episcopal School	Richmond, Virginia
G	2	Chaunce Jenkins	6 ft 4 in (1.93 m)	173 lb (78 kg)	So	Wichita State	Newport News, Virginia
G	3	Imo Essien	5 ft 11 in (1.8 m)	170 lb (77 kg)	So	Bishop Lynch High School	Wylie, Texas
G	4	Jadin Johnson	6 ft 3 in (1.91 m)	180 lb (82 kg)	Fr	Millard North High School	Omaha, Nebraska
G	10	D’Angelo Stines	6 ft 2 in (1.88 m)	180 lb (82 kg)	So	Mount Saint Joseph High School	Columbia, Maryland
G	11	Tyreek Scott-Grayson	6 ft 5 in (1.96 m)	181 lb (82 kg)	GS	Northeastern	Brick, New Jersey
F	12	Ben Stanley	6 ft 7 in (2.01 m)	235 lb (107 kg)	RS Sr	Xavier	Baltimore, Maryland
G	13	P.J. Gill (W)	5 ft 11 in (1.8 m)	150 lb (68 kg)	Sr	Johnson & Wales	Virginia Beach, Virginia
G	15	Tre Brown	6 ft 1 in (1.85 m)	165 lb (75 kg)	RS Sr	Drexel	Tacoma, Washington
G	22	Charles Smith IV	6 ft 5 in (1.96 m)	185 lb (84 kg)	Jr	SMU	Atlanta, Georgia
F	23	Dericko Williams	6 ft 7 in (2.01 m)	222 lb (101 kg)	RS Jr	Tallahassee Community College	Kinston, North Carolina
F	25	Faizon Fields	6 ft 10 in (2.08 m)	225 lb (102 kg)	RS So	Chipola College	Memphis, Tennessee
G	30	Cooper Jones (W)	6 ft 1 in (1.85 m)	163 lb (74 kg)	Fr	Walsingham Academy	Williamsburg, Virginia
G	55	Bryce Baker	6 ft 5 in (1.96 m)	190 lb (86 kg)	Fr	Donda Academy	Mooresville, North Carolina

Head coach

- Jeff Jones (Virginia)

Assistant coach(es)

- Chris Kovensky (Old Dominion)
- Jamal Robinson (Virginia)
- Jordan Brooks (Hampton)

Legend

- (C) Team captain
- (S) Suspended
- (I) Ineligible
- (W) Walk-on
- Injured
- Current redshirt

Roster

== Schedule and results ==
Date time, TV	Rank^{#}	Opponent^{#}	Result	Record	High points	High rebounds	High assists	Site (attendance) city, state
Exhibition
November 2, 2022*; 7:00 p.m.		Christopher Newport	W 77–58	–	18 – Stanley	12 – Long	2 – Tied	Chartway Arena (4,649); Norfolk, VA
Non-conference regular season
November 7, 2022*; 7:00 p.m., ESPN+		Maryland Eastern Shore	W 84–65	1–0	25 – Long	11 – Scott-Grayson	5 – Scott-Grayson	Chartway Arena (4,798); Norfolk, VA
November 11, 2022*; 7:00 p.m., FloSports		at Drexel	L 59–71	1–1	18 – Stanley	6 – Tied	3 – Long	Daskalakis Athletic Center (1,919); Philadelphia, PA
November 14, 2022*; 7:00 p.m., ESPN+		Virginia Wesleyan	W 72–58	2–1	15 – Scott-Grayson	12 – Long	4 – Long	Chartway Arena (5,085); Norfolk, VA
November 17, 2022*; 2:00 p.m., ESPN2		vs. Virginia Tech; Charleston Classic Quarterfinals	L 71–75	2–2	24 – Jenkins	11 – Long	4 – Jenkins	TD Arena (2,155); Charleston, SC
November 18, 2022*; 2:30 p.m., ESPNU		vs. Furman; Charleston Classic Consolation Semifinals	W 82–77	3–2	26 – Scott-Grayson	8 – Long	6 – Scott-Grayson	TD Arena (2,030); Charleston, SC
November 20, 2022*; 12:45 p.m., ESPNews		vs. Davidson; Charleston Classic Fifth Place Game	L 61–66	3–3	20 – Stanley	10 – Tied	5 – Tied	TD Arena (1,621); Charleston, SC
November 26, 2022*; 7:00 p.m., ESPN+		East Carolina	W 71–50	4–3	15 – Stanley	10 – Williams	5 – Essien	Chartway Arena (4,898); Norfolk, VA
November 29, 2022*; 7:00 p.m., FloSports		at College of Charleston	L 60–75	4–4	17 – Jenkins	6 – Fields	4 – Jenkins	TD Arena (3,935); Charleston, SC
December 3, 2022*; 7:00 p.m., ESPN+		Norfolk State; Rivalry	W 68–62	5–4	23 – Jenkins	7 – Williams	3 – Wade	Chartway Arena (7,966); Norfolk, VA
December 7, 2022*; 7:00 p.m., ESPN+		William & Mary; Rivalry	W 72–62	6–4	11 – Williams	6 – Fields	3 – Tied	Chartway Arena (4,579); Norfolk, VA
December 10, 2022*; 8:00 p.m., ESPN+		Gardner–Webb	W 44–43	7–4	12 – Long	9 – Long	5 – Essien	Chartway Arena (4,741); Norfolk, VA
December 21, 2022*; 4:00 p.m., ESPN+		George Mason	W 78–77	8–4	30 – Scott-Grayson	7 – Williams	5 – Essien	Chartway Arena (4,297); Norfolk, VA
Sun Belt Conference regular season
December 29, 2022; 7:00 p.m., ESPN+		Arkansas State	L 57–60	8–5 (0–1)	16 – Scott-Grayson	10 – Long	3 – Scott-Grayson	Chartway Arena (4,464); Norfolk, VA
December 31, 2022; 2:00 p.m., ESPN+		Louisiana	W 70–66	9–5 (1–1)	17 – Scott-Grayson	9 – Long	3 – Scott-Grayson	Chartway Arena (5,094); Norfolk, VA
January 5, 2023; 7:00 p.m., ESPN+		at Troy	L 71–78	9–6 (1–2)	31 – Scott-Grayson	7 – Stanley	4 – Jenkins	Trojan Arena (2,322); Troy, AL
January 7, 2023; 3:00 p.m., ESPN+		at Georgia Southern	W 81–75 ^{OT}	10–6 (2–2)	22 – Stanley	9 – Williams	7 – Jenkins	Hanner Fieldhouse (1,412); Statesboro, GA
January 12, 2023; 7:00 p.m., ESPN+		Coastal Carolina	L 66–67	10–7 (2–3)	15 – Jenkins	11 – Long	3 – Jenkins	Chartway Arena (6,021); Norfolk, VA
January 14, 2023; 7:00 p.m., ESPN+		at Marshall	L 65–73	10–8 (2–4)	23 – Jenkins	10 – Long	4 – Jenkins	Cam Henderson Center (5,719); Huntington, WV
January 19, 2023; 7:00 p.m., ESPN+		Georgia State	W 70–58	11–8 (3–4)	24 – Scott-Grayson	9 – Scott-Grayson	5 – Scott-Grayson	Chartway Arena (5,433); Norfolk, VA
January 21, 2023; 7:00 p.m., ESPN+		Appalachian State	L 58–72	11–9 (3–5)	16 – Scott-Grayson	7 – Williams	4 – Jenkins	Chartway Arena (5,954); Norfolk, VA
January 26, 2023; 8:00 p.m., ESPN+		at South Alabama	W 66–64	12–9 (4–5)	16 – Jenkins	13 – Long	3 – Long	Mitchell Center (1,894); Mobile, AL
January 28, 2023; 4:00 p.m., ESPN+		at Coastal Carolina	W 60–59	13–9 (5–5)	19 – Long	19 – Long	3 – Stines	HTC Center (1,656); Conway, SC
February 2, 2023; 7:00 p.m., ESPN+		James Madison; Royal Rivalry	L 73–78	13–10 (5–6)	19 – Jenkins	10 – Long	5 – Jenkins	Chartway Arena (7,691); Norfolk, VA
February 4, 2023; 7:00 p.m., ESPN+		Georgia Southern	W 64–58	14–10 (6–6)	16 – Jenkins	12 – Long	3 – Tied	Chartway Arena (7,029); Norfolk, VA
February 9, 2023; 7:00 p.m., ESPN+		at Georgia State	W 63–60	15–10 (7–6)	16 – Scott-Grayson	12 – Long	4 – Scott-Grayson	GSU Convocation Center (1,581); Atlanta, GA
February 11, 2023; 5:00 p.m., ESPN+		at Texas State	W 70–68	16–10 (8–6)	19 – Jenkins	7 – Fields	3 – Williams	Strahan Coliseum (2,518); San Marcos, TX
February 16, 2023; 7:00 p.m., ESPN+		at James Madison; Royal Rivalry	L 67–76	16–11 (8–7)	12 – Tied	7 – Williams	4 – Jenkins	Atlantic Union Bank Center (4,829); Harrisonburg, VA
February 18, 2023; 4:00 p.m., ESPN+		at Appalachian State	W 74–63	17–11 (9–7)	17 – Long	12 – Long	4 – Tied	Holmes Center (3,651); Boone, NC
February 22, 2023; 7:00 p.m., ESPN+		Southern Miss	W 69–64	18–11 (10–7)	20 – Long	11 – Tied	5 – Jenkins	Chartway Arena (5,428); Norfolk, VA
February 24, 2023; 7:00 p.m., ESPN+		Marshall	W 71–67	19–11 (11–7)	23 – Jenkins	13 – Long	4 – Jenkins	Chartway Arena (6,425); Norfolk, VA
Sun Belt tournament
March 2, 2023; 6:00 p.m., ESPN+	(6)	vs. (11) Texas State; Second Round	L 36–65	19–12	8 – Tied	8 – Long	2 – Long	Pensacola Bay Center (821); Pensacola, FL
*Non-conference game. ^{#}Rankings from AP Poll. (#) Tournament seedings in parentheses. All times are in Eastern.
