= 2021–22 Louisiana Ragin' Cajuns men's basketball team =

American college basketball season

2021–22 Louisiana Ragin' Cajuns men's basketball
- Conference: Sun Belt Conference
- West Division
- Record: 16–15 (8–9 Sun Belt)
- Head coach: Bob Marlin (12th season)
- Assistant coaches: Neil Hardin; Brock Morris; Derrick Zimmerman
- Home arena: Cajundome

2021–22 Sun Belt Conference men's basketball standings
	Conf.				Overall
Team	W		L	PCT	W		L	PCT
Texas State	12	–	3	.800	21	–	8	.724
Appalachian State	12	–	6	.667	19	–	15	.559
Georgia State †	9	–	5	.643	18	–	11	.621
Troy	10	–	6	.625	20	–	12	.625
South Alabama	9	–	7	.563	21	–	12	.636
Arkansas State	8	–	7	.533	18	–	11	.621
Coastal Carolina	8	–	8	.500	19	–	14	.576
Louisiana	8	–	9	.471	16	–	15	.516
UT Arlington	7	–	10	.412	11	–	18	.379
Georgia Southern	5	–	11	.313	13	–	16	.448
Louisiana–Monroe	5	–	13	.278	13	–	18	.419
Little Rock	3	–	11	.214	9	–	19	.321
† 2022 Sun Belt Tournament winner

The 2021–22 Louisiana Ragin' Cajuns men's basketball team represented the University of Louisiana at Lafayette during the 2021–22 NCAA Division I men's basketball season. The Ragin' Cajuns, led by twelfth-year head coach Bob Marlin, played their home games at the Cajundome as members of the Sun Belt Conference.

The Ragin' Cajuns finished the 2020–21 season 17–9, 10–7 in Sun Belt play to finish second in the conference's Western Division. The Cajuns proceeded to the Sun Belt Conference Men's Basketball Tournament. After receiving a first-round bye, they ultimately lost to the Georgia State Panthers.

== Offseason ==
=== Departures ===
Name	Number	Pos.	Height	Weight	Year	Hometown	Notes
Cedric Russell	0	G	6'2"	190	Senior	Alexandria, Louisiana	Graduated
Devin Butts	1	G	6'6"	180	Sophomore	Macon, Georgia	Released/Quit
Jacobi Gordon	5	F	6'7"	220	Junior	Houston, Texas	Transfer to Florida Memorial
Mylik Wilson	13	G	6'3"	175	Sophomore	Rayville, Louisiana	Transfer to Texas Tech
Chris Spenkuch	25	F	6'7"	195	Sophomore	Pembroke Pines, Florida	Transfer to Cowley

=== Transfers ===
Name	Number	Pos.	Height	Weight	Year	Hometown	Old School
Jalen Dalcourt	5	G	6'1"	160	Junior	Lafayette, Louisiana	San Jose State
Greg Williams, Jr.	13	G	6'3"	205	Junior	Lafayette, Louisiana	St. John's
Jordan Brown	21	F	6'11"	225	Sophomore	Roseville, California	Arizona
Antwann Jones	25	G	6'6"	220	Sophomore	Orlando, Florida	Creighton

=== Recruiting ===
College recruiting information
Name	Hometown	School	Height	Weight	Commit date
Joe Charles; Forward	Carencro, LA	Carencro HS	6 ft 7 in (2.01 m)	195 lb (88 kg)	Nov 11, 2020
Joe Charles; Forward	Recruit ratings: No ratings found				
Carter Domingue; Guard	Lafayette, LA	St. Thomas More Catholic HS	6 ft 2 in (1.88 m)	205 lb (93 kg)	Jul 14, 2019
Carter Domingue; Guard	Recruit ratings: No ratings found				
Overall recruit ranking:
Note: In many cases, Scout, Rivals, 247Sports, On3, and ESPN may conflict in their listings of height and weight.; In these cases, the average was taken. ESPN grades are on a 100-point scale.; Sources: "Louisiana 2021-22 Basketball Commits". ESPN.; "2021-22 Team Ranking". Rivals.

== Roster ==
2021–22 Louisiana Ragin' Cajuns men's basketball team
Players
Coaches

Pos.	#	Name	Height	Weight	Year	Previous school	Hometown
F	1	Joe Charles	6 ft 7 in (2.01 m)	195 lb (88 kg)	Fr	Carencro HS	Carencro, Louisiana
G	2	Michael Thomas	6 ft 1 in (1.85 m)	160 lb (73 kg)	Fr	Hamilton Christian	Lake Charles, Louisiana
G	3	Trajan Wesley	5 ft 9 in (1.75 m)	165 lb (75 kg)	Jr	Cypress Falls HS	Navasota, Texas
F	4	Kobe Julien	6 ft 6 in (1.98 m)	215 lb (98 kg)	RS Fr	Madison Preparatory	Baton Rouge, Louisiana
G	5	Jalen Dalcourt	6 ft 1 in (1.85 m)	160 lb (73 kg)	Jr	Lafayette HS; San Jose State	Lafayette, Louisiana
F	10	Theo Akwuba	6 ft 11 in (2.11 m)	225 lb (102 kg)	Jr	Brewbaker Technology Magnet HS; Portland	Montgomery, Alabama
G	11	Durey Cadwell	6 ft 5 in (1.96 m)	185 lb (84 kg)	So	Klein Forest HS; Daytona State College	Houston, Texas
G	13	Greg Williams, Jr.	6 ft 3 in (1.91 m)	205 lb (93 kg)	Jr	Lafayette Christian; St. John's	Lafayette, Louisiana
F	21	Jordan Brown	6 ft 11 in (2.11 m)	225 lb (102 kg)	So	Prolific Preparatory; Arizona	Roseville, California
G	22	Kentrell Garnett	6 ft 1 in (1.85 m)	165 lb (75 kg)	Fr	Catholic HS	Donaldsonville, Louisiana
F	23	Dou Gueye	6 ft 9 in (2.06 m)	220 lb (100 kg)	Sr	Hachioji; Daytona State College	Dakar, Senegal
G	25	Antwann Jones	6 ft 6 in (1.98 m)	220 lb (100 kg)	RS So	Oak Ridge HS; Creighton	Orlando, Florida
F	35	Isaiah Richards	6 ft 10 in (2.08 m)	225 lb (102 kg)	Fr	South Shore HS; Springfield Commonwealth	Brooklyn, New York
G	40	Carter Domingue	6 ft 2 in (1.88 m)	205 lb (93 kg)	Fr	St. Thomas More Catholic HS	Lafayette, Louisiana
G	41	Brayan Au	6 ft 4 in (1.93 m)	190 lb (86 kg)	Jr	Anthony HS; Ranger College	Nuevo Casas Grandes, Mexico
G	55	Ty Harper	6 ft 3 in (1.91 m)	175 lb (79 kg)	Fr	Santa Clarita Christian	Norcross, Georgia

Head coach

- Bob Marlin (Mississippi State)

Assistant coach(es)

- Neil Hardin (West Florida)
- Brock Morris (Alabama)
- Derrick Zimmerman (Mississippi State)

Legend

- (C) Team captain
- (S) Suspended
- (I) Ineligible
- (W) Walk-on
- Injured
- Current redshirt

Roster
Last update: 13 November 2021

== Schedule and results ==
Date time, TV	Rank^{#}	Opponent^{#}	Result	Record	High points	High rebounds	High assists	Site (attendance) city, state
Exhibition
10/24/2021*; 2:00 p.m.		at No. 14 Alabama; Charity Exhibition	L 68–73		17 – Julien	9 – Brown	5 – Williams Jr.	Coleman Coliseum (2,157); Tuscaloosa, AL
Non-conference regular season
11/09/2021*; 7:30 p.m., ESPN+		West Florida	W 81–47	1–0	14 – Brown	9 – Richards	4 – Brown	Cajundome (2,069); Lafayette, LA
11/12/2021*; 7:00 p.m.		at Southern Miss	W 66–45	2–0	18 – Williams Jr.	9 – Brown	7 – Williams Jr.	Reed Green Coliseum (3,575); Hattiesburg, MS
11/17/2021*; 7:00 p.m., ESPN+		Xavier (LA)	W 84–72	3–0	18 – Brown	8 – Akwuba	3 – Julien	Cajundome (2,696); Lafayette, LA
11/21/2021*; 6:30 p.m., BTN		at Indiana	L 44–76	3–1	10 – Brown	10 – Akwuba	2 – Brown	Simon Skjodt Assembly Hall (11,407); Bloomington, IN
11/23/2021*; 6:00 p.m., ESPN+		at Marshall	L 79–93	3–2	18 – Williams Jr.	10 – Akwuba	3 – Gueye	Cam Henderson Center (4,111); Huntington, WV
11/27/2021*; 11:00 a.m., ESPN+		Jackson State	L 70–75	3–3	15 – Julien	5 – Tied	3 – Jones	Cajundome (2,756); Lafayette, LA
12/03/2021*; 7:00 p.m., ESPN+		New Orleans	W 80–67	4–3	16 – Wesley	13 – Brown	4 – Gueye	Cajundome (2,826); Lafayette, LA
12/08/2021*; 7:00 p.m., ESPN+		McNeese State	W 83–68	5–3	20 – Julien	16 – Brown	4 – Tied	Cajundome (2,524); Lafayette, LA
12/11/2021*; 11:00 a.m., ESPNU		at Louisiana Tech	L 69-78	5–4	30 – Brown	6 – Brown	5 – Tied	Thomas Assembly Center (2,603); Ruston, LA
12/14/2021*; 7:00 p.m., ESPN+		at No. 14 Houston	L 56–71	5–5	13 – Brown	14 – Brown	3 – Julien	Fertitta Center (6,955); Houston, TX
12/20/2021*; 7:00 p.m., ESPN+		Loyola (LA)	Canceled due to COVID-19 protocols					Cajundome; Lafayette, LA
Conference regular season
12/30/2021; 5:30 p.m., ESPN+		Appalachian State	W 71–55	6–5 (1–0)	16 – Brown	11 – Akwuba	7 – Wesley	Holmes Center (2,535); Boone, NC
01/01/2022; 1:00 p.m., ESPN+		at Coastal Carolina	W 65–64	7–5 (2–0)	20 – Brown	8 – Brown	5 – Thomas	HTC Center (778); Conway, SC
01/06/2022; 7:00 p.m., ESPN+		Arkansas State	W 83–77 ^{OT}	8–5 (3–0)	20 – Julien	15 – Akwuba	5 – Au	Cajundome (2,682); Lafayette, LA
01/08/2022; 7:00 p.m., ESPN+		Little Rock	Canceled due to COVID-19 issues					Cajundome; Lafayette, LA
01/13/2022; 7:00 p.m., ESPN+		at UT Arlington	L 73–83	8–6 (3–1)	20 – Julien	6 – Brown	4 – 3 Tied	College Park Center (1,057); Arlington, TX
01/15/2022; 4:00 p.m., ESPN+		at Texas State	L 68–72	8–7 (3–2)	18 – Brown	16 – Brown	3 – 2 Tied	Strahan Arena (1,163); San Marcos, TX
01/20/2022; 7:00 p.m., ESPN+		South Alabama	L 70–77	8–8 (3–3)	21 – Brown	11 – Brown	2 – 3 Tied	Cajundome (2,853); Lafayette, LA
01/22/2022; 7:00 p.m., ESPN+		Troy	W 69–59	9–8 (4–3)	17 – Julien	9 – Akwuba	3 – Charles	Cajundome (3,150); Lafayette, LA
01/27/2022; 7:00 p.m., ESPN+		Georgia State	L 64–68	9–9 (4–4)	17 – Garnett	7 – Akwuba	3 – Thomas	Cajundome (2,580); Lafayette, LA
01/29/2022; 7:00 p.m., ESPN+		Georgia Southern	L 65–66	9–10 (4–5)	19 – Julien	8 – Akwuba	6 – Thomas	Cajundome (3,023); Lafayette, LA
02/03/2022; 6:30 p.m., ESPN+		at Little Rock	W 75–51	10–10 (5–5)	20 – Brown	9 – 2 Tied	5 – Thomas	Jack Stephens Center (1,833); Little Rock, AR
02/05/2022; 4:00 p.m., ESPN+		Arkansas State	L 58–67	10–11 (5–6)	20 – Brown	12 – Brown	3 – Wesley	First National Bank Arena (2,542); Jonesboro, AR
02/10/2022; 7:00 p.m., ESPN+		Texas State	L 73–82	10–12 (5–7)	22 – Julien	8 – Akwuba	4 – Charles	Cajundome (2,609); Lafayette, LA
02/12/2022; 2:00 p.m., ESPN+		UT Arlington	L 77–80 ^{OT}	10–13 (5–8)	21 – Brown	12 – Brown	4 – Williams Jr.	Cajundome (2,591); Lafayette, LA
02/17/2022; 6:30 p.m., ESPN+		at Louisiana–Monroe	W 78–77	11–13 (6–8)	26 – Brown	7 – Brown	4 – Brown	Fant–Ewing Coliseum (2,287); Monroe, LA
02/19/2022; 7:00 p.m., ESPN+		Louisiana–Monroe	W 79–74	12–13 (7–8)	26 – Julien	10 – Julien	4 – Thomas	Cajundome (2,850); Lafayette, LA
02/23/2022; 6:00 pm, ESPN+		at Georgia Southern	W 82–69	13–13 (8–8)	21 – Akwuba	10 – Akwuba	4 – Julien	Hanner Fieldhouse (1,669); Statesboro, GA
02/25/2022; 6:00 p.m., ESPN+		at Georgia State	L 58–65	13–14 (8–9)	18 – Williams Jr.	9 – Brown	3 – Thomas	GSU Sports Arena (1,445); Atlanta, GA
Sun Belt tournament
03/03/2022; 11:30 am, ESPN+	(8)	vs. (9) UT Arlington; First round	W 67–64	14–14	16 – Dalcourt	7 – Williams Jr.	4 – Au	Pensacola Bay Center (437); Pensacola, FL
03/05/2022; 11:30 am, ESPN+	(8)	vs. (1) Texas State; Quarterfinals	W 79–72	15–14	31 – Brown	11 – Akwuba	5 – Tied	Pensacola Bay Center (2,167); Pensacola, FL
03/06/2022; 5:00 pm, ESPN+	(8)	vs. (4) Troy; Semifinals	W 66–57	16–14	16 – Williams Jr.	8 – Akwuba	3 – Thomas	Pensacola Bay Center (1,985); Pensacola, FL
03/07/2022; 6:00 pm, ESPN2	(8)	vs. (3) Georgia State; Championship	L 71–80	16–15	24 – Brown	8 – Brown	3 – Brown	Pensacola Bay Center; Pensacola, FL
*Non-conference game. ^{#}Rankings from AP Poll. (#) Tournament seedings in parentheses. All times are in Central Time.

== See also ==
- 2021–22 Louisiana Ragin' Cajuns women's basketball team
