= Jordan Brown (basketball) =

American basketball player (born 1999)

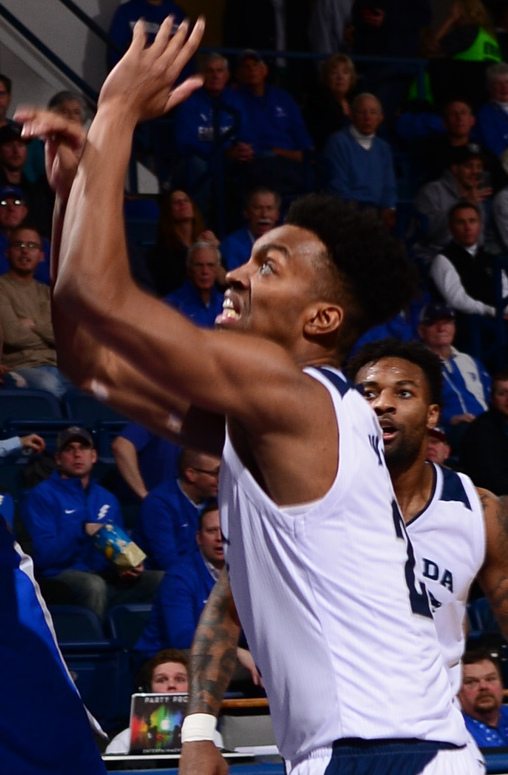
- Brown with Nevada in 2019

Free agent
- Position: Power forward / center

Personal information
- Born: December 4, 1999 (age 26) Roseville, California, U.S.
- Listed height: 6 ft 11 in (2.11 m)
- Listed weight: 225 lb (102 kg)

Career information
- High school: Woodcreek (Roseville, California); Prolific Prep (Napa, California)
- College: Nevada (2018–2019); Arizona (2020–2021); Louisiana (2021–2023); Memphis (2023–2024)
- NBA draft: 2024: undrafted
- Playing career: 2024–present

Career history
- 2024: KK Dubrava
- 2024-2025: Basket Brno
- 2025: Šiauliai

Career highlights
- Lou Henson Award (2023); First-team All-Sun Belt (2023); Second-team All-Sun Belt (2022); Pac-12 Sixth Man of the Year (2021); McDonald's All-American (2018); Nike Hoop Summit (2018)
Medals
Men's basketball
Representing United States
FIBA U17 World Cup
Gold medal – first place	2016 Spain	Team
FIBA Americas U16 Championship
Gold medal – first place	2015 Argentina	Team

Jordan Isaiah Brown (born December 4, 1999) is an American professional basketball player who recently played for Šiauliai of the Lithuanian Basketball League (LKL). He played college basketball for the Nevada Wolf Pack, Arizona Wildcats, and Louisiana Ragin’ Cajuns, and the Memphis Tigers.

== High school career ==
Brown attended Woodcreek High School for three years. As a freshman, he averaged 22.7 points, 10.5 rebounds and 3.0 blocks leading his team to a 27–6 record. As a sophomore, he averaged 26.7 points and 15.0 rebounds leading his team to a 20–9 record. As a junior, he averaged 26.3 points and 15.8 rebounds per game and was named a MaxPreps second-team All-American. He led the team to the state title game, where Woodcreek lost to Bishop Montgomery High School 74–67 despite 35 points and 17 rebounds from Brown. He was named the 2017 Sacramento Bee Player of the Year. Brown transferred to Prolific Prep his senior year of high school. He averaged 23.5 points and 13.1 rebounds per game at Prolific Prep while earning MaxPreps fourth-team All-American honors. Brown was named a McDonald's All-American and was the only McDonald's All American to commit to a university outside the Power 7.

=== Recruiting ===
Brown was a five-star recruit by 247Sports and Rivals and a four-star recruit by ESPN. Nevada was the first program to extend a scholarship offer to Brown, on April 13, 2015, after his freshman year. Nevada coach Eric Musselman first noticed Brown at an AAU event playing against his son. On May 11, 2018, he committed to play college basketball for Nevada over Arizona and California.

College recruiting
Name	Hometown	School	Height	Weight	Commit date
Jordan Brown; C	Roseville, CA	Prolific Prep (CA)	6 ft 10 in (2.08 m)	205 lb (93 kg)	May 11, 2018
Jordan Brown; C	Recruit ratings: Rivals: 247Sports: ESPN: (89)				
Overall recruit ranking: Rivals: 12 247Sports: 16 ESPN: 33
Note: In many cases, Scout, Rivals, 247Sports, On3, and ESPN may conflict in their listings of height and weight.; In these cases, the average was taken. ESPN grades are on a 100-point scale.; Sources: "Nevada 2018 Basketball Commitments". Rivals.; "2018 Nevada Wolf Pack Recruiting Class". ESPN.; "2018 Team Ranking". Rivals.

== College career ==
With the addition of Brown and the return of twins Cody and Caleb Martin, Nevada was ranked in the top 10 of several preseason polls in the 2018–19 season. Brown was named Preseason MWC Freshman of the Year. At the end of the season, Brown entered the transfer portal. On June 9, 2019, Brown announced that he would transfer to Arizona. Under NCAA rules, he was required to sit out the 2019–20 season, but became eligible to play in the 2020–21 season, with three years of eligibility left. Brown averaged 9.4 points and 5.2 rebounds per game, earning Pac-12 Sixth Man of the Year honors. After coach Sean Miller was fired, Brown opted to transfer to Louisiana. As a junior, Brown averaged 15.3 points, 8.6 rebounds, and 1.1 blocks per game. He was named to the Second Team All-Sun Belt. On June 27, 2023, Brown transferred to Memphis.

== Professional career ==
After going undrafted in the 2024 NBA draft, Brown signed a contract to join KK Dubrava. In a statement released on October 15, 2024, it was announced that he and the club had parted ways by mutual agreement.

On October 24, 2024, Brown joined Basket Brno for a month-long tryout, and stayed with the club until the end of the season.

On 10 August, 2025, he signed with Šiauliai of the Lithuanian Basketball League (LKL).

== National team career ==
Brown won a gold medal with the United States at the 2015 FIBA Americas Under-16 Championship in Bahía Blanca, Argentina. He played in all five games and averaged 9.4 points, 4.4 rebounds, and 2.0 assists per game. Brown won a gold medal with USA Basketball at the 2016 FIBA Under-17 World Championship where he averaged 5.9 points and 4.9 rebounds.

== Career statistics ==
Legend
GP	Games played	GS	Games started	MPG	Minutes per game
FG%	Field goal percentage	3P%	3-point field goal percentage	FT%	Free throw percentage
RPG	Rebounds per game	APG	Assists per game	SPG	Steals per game
BPG	Blocks per game	PPG	Points per game	**Bold**	Career high

=== College ===
Year	Team	GP	GS	MPG	FG%	3P%	FT%	RPG	APG	SPG	BPG	PPG
2018–19	Nevada	**33**	1	10.1	.506	.000	**.625**	2.1	.5	.3	.5	3.0
2019–20	Arizona	Redshirt										
2020–21	Arizona	26	11	19.6	.560	.000	.598	5.2	.6	.5	.9	9.4
2021–22	Louisiana	27	24	28.8	.516	**.444**	.619	**8.6**	1.1	**.8**	1.1	15.3
2022–23	Louisiana	**33**	**33**	**31.8**	**.571**	.250	.613	**8.6**	**1.8**	.7	**1.2**	**19.3**
2023–24	Memphis	18	5	10.3	.483	.000	.560	2.2	.2	.2	.3	4.0
Career		137	74	20.8	.543	.356	.550	5.5	.9	.5	.8	10.7
