= Hamilton Christian School =

Location
- 1415 8th Street; Lake Charles, Louisiana; United States
- 30°13′6″N 93°12′1″W

Information
- Type: Private school
- Religious affiliation: Christian
- Established: 1990
- Principal: Morgan Daugherty
- Grades: K-12
- Gender: Co-educational
- Colors: Forest Green, White and Black
- Athletics conference: Louisiana High School Athletic Association
- Mascot: Warrior
- Teams: Warriors; Lady Warriors
- Website: www.hcswarriors.org

Hamilton Christian School is a K-12 Christian private school in Lake Charles, Louisiana, United States.

== Athletics ==
Hamilton Christian School competes in the Louisiana High School Athletic Association in District 4 of Class 1A.

Hamilton's District 4 rivals include the Basile Bearcats, Elton Indians, Merryville Panthers, Oberlin Tigers, South Cameron Tarpons, St. Edmund Blue Jays, and Grand Lake Hornets.

The Warriors and Lady Warriors compete in a variety of sports. The Warriors compete in baseball, basketball, football, golf, bowling, and track & field (indoor and outdoor), while the Lady Warriors compete in softball, basketball, volleyball, golf, bowling, and track & field (indoor and outdoor).

=== State Runners-Up ===
Boys Basketball

- (1) 2019

== Notable alumni ==
- Jace Peterson, professional baseball player for the Oakland Athletics and formerly the Atlanta Braves, Baltimore Orioles, and Milwaukee Brewers.
