= 2022–23 Coastal Carolina Chanticleers men's basketball team =

American college basketball season

2022–23 Coastal Carolina Chanticleers men's basketball
- Conference: Sun Belt Conference
- Record: 11–20 (5–13 Sun Belt)
- Head coach: Cliff Ellis (16th season)
- Associate head coach: Benny Moss
- Assistant coaches: Elwyn McRoy; Nima Omidvar
- Home arena: HTC Center

2022–23 Sun Belt Conference men's basketball standings
| | Conf. | | | | Overall |
| Team | W | | L | PCT | W | | L | PCT |
|---|---|---|---|---|---|---|---|---|
| Southern Miss | 14 | – | 4 | .778 | 25 | – | 8 | .758 |
| Louisiana † | 13 | – | 5 | .722 | 26 | – | 8 | .765 |
| Marshall | 13 | – | 5 | .722 | 24 | – | 8 | .750 |
| James Madison | 12 | – | 6 | .667 | 22 | – | 11 | .667 |
| Troy | 11 | – | 7 | .611 | 20 | – | 13 | .606 |
| Old Dominion | 11 | – | 7 | .611 | 19 | – | 12 | .613 |
| Georgia Southern | 9 | – | 9 | .500 | 17 | – | 16 | .515 |
| South Alabama | 9 | – | 9 | .500 | 19 | – | 16 | .543 |
| Appalachian State | 9 | – | 9 | .500 | 16 | – | 16 | .500 |
| Louisiana–Monroe | 7 | – | 11 | .389 | 11 | – | 21 | .344 |
| Texas State | 6 | – | 12 | .333 | 16 | – | 19 | .457 |
| Coastal Carolina | 5 | – | 13 | .278 | 11 | – | 20 | .355 |
| Arkansas State | 4 | – | 14 | .222 | 13 | – | 20 | .394 |
| Georgia State | 3 | – | 15 | .167 | 10 | – | 21 | .323 |
† 2023 Sun Belt Tournament winner

The 2022–23 Coastal Carolina Chanticleers men's basketball team represented Coastal Carolina University in the 2022–23 NCAA Division I men's basketball season. The Chanticleers, led by 16th-year head coach Cliff Ellis, played their home games at the HTC Center in Conway, South Carolina as members of the Sun Belt Conference.

== Previous season ==
The Chanticleers finished the 2021–22 season 19–14, 8–8 in Sun Belt Play to finish in 7th place. They lost in the first round of the Sun Belt tournament to Georgia Southern. They received an invitation to the new The Basketball Classic where they defeated Maryland Eastern Shore, Florida Gulf Coast, and South Alabama to advance to the championship game where they lost to Fresno State.

== Offseason ==
=== Departures ===
| Name | Number | Pos. | Height | Weight | Year | Hometown | Reason for departure |
|---|---|---|---|---|---|---|---|
| Garrick Green | 2 | G | 6'6" | 215 | Senior | Baton Rouge, LA | Graduated |
| Rudi Williams | 3 | G | 6'2" | 190 | Senior | Hamilton, ON | Graduate transferred to BYU |
| Kevin Williamson | 4 | G | 6'5" | 200 | Senior | Aiken, SC | Transferred |
| Deshawn Thomas | 5 | C | 6'10" | 250 | Senior | Columbia, SC | Graduate transferred to USC Aiken |
| Ebrima Dibba | 10 | G | 6'6" | 205 | RS Junior | Bredäng, Skarholmen | Graduate transferred to South Carolina |
| Jourdan Smith | 11 | F | 6'11" | 225 | Junior | Montgomery, AL | Transferred to Grambling State |
| Isaac Hippolyte | 15 | F | 6'7" | 215 | Senior | Spring Valley, NY | Graduate transferred to Chowan |
| Ahmard Harvey | 20 | F | 6'7" | 195 | Junior | Freeport, Bahamas | Transferred to High Point |
| Jalen Milner | 21 | G | 6'1" | 190 | Junior | Milledgeville, GA | Walk-on; transferred |
| Vince Cole | 24 | G | 6'6" | 190 | Senior | Charleston, SC | Graduated/2022 NBA draft |

=== Incoming transfers ===
| Name | Number | Pos. | Height | Weight | Year | Hometown | Previous School |
|---|---|---|---|---|---|---|---|
| Kylan Blackmon | 0 | G | 6'3" | 195 | Sophomore | Oxford, MS | NE Mississippi CC |
| Seth Dawson | 1 | G | 6'5" | 205 | RS Junior | Antioch, CA | College of the Sequoias |
| DJ Basey | 2 | C | 6'10" | 220 | Senior | Mesquite, TX | Connors State |
| Antonio Daye Jr. | 5 | G | 6'3" | 200 | GS Senior | Durham, NC | Fordham |
| Jomaru Brown | 11 | G | 6'2" | 186 | Senior | Raleigh, NC | Eastern Kentucky |
| Henry Abraham | 13 | G | 6'0" | 175 | Junior | Cambridge, MN | Eastern Illinois |
| Jaland Whitehead | 21 | F | 6'9" | 215 | Senior | Grand Rapids, MI | Johnson County CC |
| Linton Brown | 22 | G | 6'5" | 210 | Senior | Delray Beach, FL | St. Bonaventure |
| Joey Kahl | 33 | G | 6'4" | 175 | Sophomore | Mobile, AL | Walk-on; Delta State |
| Jimmy Nichols Jr. | 55 | F | 6'8" | 225 | RS Senior | Conway, SC | VCU |

=== Recruiting ===
There were no incoming recruits for the class of 2022.

== Preseason ==
=== Preseason Sun Belt Conference poll ===
The Chanticleers were picked to finish in eighth place in the conference's preseason poll. Junior center Essam Mostafa was named preseason All-SBC Second Team.

Coaches poll
| Predicted finish | Team (1st place Votes) |
| 1 | Louisiana - 190 (10) |
| 2 | Texas State - 162 (1) |
| 3 | South Alabama - 150 (1) |
| 4 | James Madison - 149 (1) |
| 5 | Georgia State - 127 (1) |
| 6 | Marshall - 122 |
| 7 | App State - 120 |
| 8 | Coastal Carolina - 100 |
| 9 | Old Dominion - 93 |
| 10 | Troy - 76 |
| 11 | Georgia Southern - 69 |
| 12 | Arkansas State - 48 |
| 13 | Southern Miss - 34 |
| 14 | ULM - 30 |

== Roster ==
2022–23 Coastal Carolina Chanticleers men's basketball team
Players
Coaches

| Pos. | # | Name | Height | Weight | Year | Previous school | Hometown |
|---|---|---|---|---|---|---|---|
| G | 0 | Kylan Blackmon | 6 ft 3 in (1.91 m) | 200 lb (91 kg) | Jr | Oxford HS; Northeast Mississippi CC | Oxford, Mississippi |
| G | 1 | Seth Dawson | 6 ft 5 in (1.96 m) | 210 lb (95 kg) | RS Jr | Arizona Compass Prep; College of the Sequoias | Antioch, California |
| C | 2 | DJ Basey | 6 ft 10 in (2.08 m) | 230 lb (104 kg) | Sr | Poteet HS; Connors State College | Mesquite, Texas |
| G | 5 | Antonio Daye, Jr. | 6 ft 1 in (1.85 m) | 188 lb (85 kg) | GS | Fort Lauderdale HS; Fordham | Durham, North Carolina |
| G | 11 | Jomaru Brown | 6 ft 2 in (1.88 m) | 186 lb (84 kg) | Sr | South Durham HS; Eastern Kentucky | Raleigh, North Carolina |
| F | 12 | Wilfried Likayi | 6 ft 9 in (2.06 m) | 215 lb (98 kg) | GS | Parkrose HS; New Mexico State | Portland, Oregon |
| G | 13 | Henry Abraham | 6 ft 0 in (1.83 m) | 175 lb (79 kg) | So | Cambridge-Isanti HS; Eastern Illinois | Cambridge, Minnesota |
| G | 14 | Josh Uduje | 6 ft 5 in (1.96 m) | 190 lb (86 kg) | So | Arizona Compass Preparatory | London, England |
| G | 20 | Marcus Saunders (W) | 6 ft 2 in (1.88 m) | 180 lb (82 kg) | Fr | Christian Academy of Myrtle Beach | Myrtle Beach, South Carolina |
| F | 21 | Jaland Whitehead | 6 ft 9 in (2.06 m) | 220 lb (100 kg) | Sr | Wheeler HS; Johnson County CC | Grand Rapids, Michigan |
| G | 22 | Linton Brown | 6 ft 5 in (1.96 m) | 210 lb (95 kg) | Sr | Wellington HS; Indian River State College | Delray Beach, Florida |
| G | 33 | Joey Kahn (W) | 6 ft 4 in (1.93 m) | 175 lb (79 kg) | So | St. Paul's Episcopal School; Delta State | Mobile, Alabama |
| C | 44 | Essam Mostafa | 6 ft 9 in (2.06 m) | 250 lb (113 kg) | RS Jr | Long Island Lutheran HS | Cairo, Egypt |
| F | 55 | Jimmy Nichols, Jr. | 6 ft 8 in (2.03 m) | 225 lb (102 kg) | RS Jr | Conway HS; VCU | Conway, South Carolina |

Head coach

- Cliff Ellis (Middle Tennessee)

Assistant coach(es)

- Benny Moss (UNC Charlotte)
- Elwyn McRoy (Cleveland State)
- Nima Omidvar (Maryland)

Legend

- (C) Team captain
- (S) Suspended
- (I) Ineligible
- (W) Walk-on
- Injured
- Current redshirt

Roster

== Schedule and results ==
| Date time, TV | Rank^{#} | Opponent^{#} | Result | Record | High points | High rebounds | High assists | Site (attendance) city, state |
Non-conference regular season
| November 7, 2022*; 7:00 p.m., ESPN+ | | St. Mary's (MD) | W 97–43 | 1–0 | 22 – Mostafa | 12 – Mostafa | 8 – Abraham | HTC Center (1,223); Conway, SC |
| November 11, 2022*; 7:00 p.m., ESPN+ | | Methodist | W 110–47 | 2–0 | 23 – L. Brown | 15 – Nichols | 14 – Abraham | HTC Center (1,127); Conway, SC |
| November 18, 2022*; 7:30 p.m. | | at USC Upstate; Collegiate Hoops Roadshow | L 78–79 | 2–1 | 28 – J. Brown | 16 – Mostafa | 3 – J. Brown | G. B. Hodge Center (595); Spartanburg, SC |
| November 23, 2022*; 7:00 p.m., SECN+ | | at Missouri; Collegiate Hoops Roadshow | L 51–89 | 2–2 | 13 – L. Brown | 10 – Mostafa | 3 – J. Brown | Mizzou Arena (7,459); Columbia, MO |
| November 26, 2022*; 2:00 p.m., ESPN+ | | South Dakota | W 66–59 | 3–2 | 17 – J. Brown | 12 – Mostafa | 3 – Abraham | HTC Center (1,003); Conway, SC |
| November 30, 2022*; 7:30 p.m., ESPN+ | | UNC Wilmington | L 58–60 | 3–3 | 21 – Mostafa | 10 – Mostafa | 1 – Tied | HTC Center (1,509); Conway, SC |
| December 3, 2022*; 2:00 p.m., ESPN+ | | at Winthrop | W 86–81 | 4–3 | 17 – L. Brown | 8 – Likayi | 8 – Abraham | Winthrop Coliseum (1,218); Rock Hill, SC |
| December 6, 2022*; 7:00 p.m., ESPN+ | | at Wofford | L 61–71 | 4–4 | 14 – Abraham | 7 – Likayi | 2 – Tied | Jerry Richardson Indoor Stadium (914); Spartanburg, SC |
| December 10, 2022*; 2:00 p.m., ESPN+ | | Regent | W 102–39 | 5–4 | 20 – J. Brown | 10 – Mostafa | 4 – Tied | HTC Center (1,327); Conway, SC |
| December 14, 2022*; 7:00 p.m. | | at South Dakota | W 87–86 | 6–4 | 25 – Mostafa | 11 – Mostafa | 4 – Tied | Sanford Coyote Sports Center (1,523); Vermillion, SD |
| December 19, 2022*; 7:30 p.m., ESPN+ | | College of Charleston | L 69–83 | 6–5 | 19 – Uduje | 11 – Mostafa | 3 – Tied | HTC Center (1,934); Conway, SC |
Sun Belt Conference regular season
| December 29, 2022; 7:00 p.m., ESPN+ | | Louisiana | W 77–76 | 7–5 (1–0) | 28 – J. Brown | 9 – Mostafa | 5 – Abraham | HTC Center (1,372); Conway, SC |
| December 31, 2022; 2:00 p.m., ESPN+ | | Georgia Southern | L 64–73 | 7–6 (1–1) | 15 – Tied | 13 – Mostafa | 5 – J. Brown | HTC Center (1,201); Conway, SC |
| January 5, 2023; 6:30 p.m., ESPN+ | | at Appalachian State | L 62–63 | 7–7 (1–2) | 20 – Brown | 11 – Mostafa | 3 – J. Brown | Holmes Center (1,819); Boone, NC |
| January 7, 2023; 3:30 p.m., ESPN+ | | at Marshall | L 66–81 | 7–8 (1–3) | 15 – Daye | 8 – Nichols | 3 – Tied | Cam Henderson Center (4,672); Huntington, WV |
| January 12, 2023; 7:00 p.m., ESPN+ | | at Old Dominion | W 67–66 | 8–8 (2–3) | 14 – L. Brown | 16 – Mostafa | 6 – Daye | Chartway Arena (6,021); Norfolk, VA |
| January 14, 2023; 2:00 p.m., ESPN+ | | at Georgia State | L 66–100 | 8–9 (2–4) | 23 – Daye | 9 – Likayi | 3 – Tied | GSU Convocation Center (1,479); Atlanta, GA |
| January 19, 2023; 7:00 p.m., ESPN+ | | Appalachian State | W 93–84 ^{OT} | 9–9 (3–4) | 26 – Uduje | 11 – Mostafa | 10 – Daye | HTC Center (2,143); Conway, NC |
| January 21, 2023; 2:00 p.m., ESPN+ | | South Alabama | W 85–81 ^{OT} | 10–9 (4–4) | 33 – Uduje | 13 – Tied | 11 – Daye | HTC Center (1,459); Conway, SC |
| January 23, 2023*; 7:00 p.m., ESPN+ | | Chicago State | L 70–74 | 10–10 | 25 – Uduje | 10 – Mostafa | 5 – Abraham | HTC Center (1,321); Conway, SC |
| January 26, 2023; 7:00 p.m., ESPN+ | | at James Madison | L 69–75 | 10–11 (4–5) | 23 – Daye | 11 – Daye | 7 – Daye | Atlantic Union Bank Center (5,609); Williamsburg, VA |
| January 28, 2023; 4:00 p.m., ESPN+ | | Old Dominion | L 59–60 | 10–12 (4–6) | 18 – Uduje | 9 – Uduje | 5 – Daye | HTC Center (1,656); Conway, SC |
| February 2, 2023; 7:30 p.m., ESPN+ | | at Louisiana–Monroe | L 70–83 | 10–13 (4–7) | 15 – Blackmon | 6 – Uduje | 5 – Abraham | Fant–Ewing Coliseum (3,659); Monroe, LA |
| February 4, 2023; 3:00 p.m., ESPN+ | | at Arkansas State | L 57–73 | 10–14 (4–8) | 13 – Uduje | 9 – Mostafa | 2 – Daye | First National Bank Arena (1,402); Jonesboro, AR |
| February 9, 2023; 7:00 p.m., ESPN+ | | Marshall | L 74–92 | 10–15 (4–9) | 16 – J. Brown | 12 – Mostafa | 6 – Daye | HTC Center (1,923); Conway, SC |
| February 11, 2023; 2:00 p.m., ESPN+ | | James Madison | L 66–73 | 10–16 (4–10) | 22 – Uduje | 13 – Nichols | 5 – Daye | HTC Center (1,578); Conway, SC |
| February 16, 2023; 7:00 p.m., ESPN+ | | Georgia State | W 77–68 | 11–16 (5–10) | 22 – Daye | 8 – Likayi | 8 – Daye | HTC Center (1,655); Conway, SC |
| February 18, 2023; 2:00 p.m., ESPN+ | | Texas State | L 75–78 | 11–17 (5–11) | 20 – Daye | 6 – Basey | 3 – Brown | HTC Center (1,410); Conway, NC |
| February 22, 2023; 7:00 p.m., ESPN+ | | at Georgia Southern | L 68–76 | 11–18 (5–12) | 22 – Uduje | 10 – Daye | 4 – Daye | Hanner Fieldhouse (1,283); Statesboro, GA |
| February 24, 2023; 7:00 p.m., ESPN+ | | at Troy | L 74–95 | 11–19 (5–13) | 28 – Daye | 9 – Daye | 3 – Blackmon | Trojan Arena (4,232); Troy, AL |
Sun Belt tournament
| February 28, 2023; 6:00 p.m., ESPN+ | (12) | vs. (13) Arkansas State; First Round | L 69–86 | 11–20 | 24 – Daye | 12 – Mostafa | 5 – Daye | Pensacola Bay Center; Pensacola, FL |
*Non-conference game. ^{#}Rankings from AP Poll. (#) Tournament seedings in parentheses. All times are in Eastern Time.
