= 2022–23 South Alabama Jaguars men's basketball team =

American college basketball season

2022–23 South Alabama Jaguars men's basketball
- Conference: Sun Belt Conference
- Record: 19–16 (9–9 Sun Belt)
- Head coach: Richie Riley (5th season)
- Assistant coaches: Rodney Crawford; Tyler Parker; Orin Bailey, Jr.
- Home arena: Mitchell Center

2022–23 Sun Belt Conference men's basketball standings
	Conf.				Overall
Team	W		L	PCT	W		L	PCT
Southern Miss	14	–	4	.778	25	–	8	.758
Louisiana †	13	–	5	.722	26	–	8	.765
Marshall	13	–	5	.722	24	–	8	.750
James Madison	12	–	6	.667	22	–	11	.667
Troy	11	–	7	.611	20	–	13	.606
Old Dominion	11	–	7	.611	19	–	12	.613
Georgia Southern	9	–	9	.500	17	–	16	.515
South Alabama	9	–	9	.500	19	–	16	.543
Appalachian State	9	–	9	.500	16	–	16	.500
Louisiana–Monroe	7	–	11	.389	11	–	21	.344
Texas State	6	–	12	.333	16	–	19	.457
Coastal Carolina	5	–	13	.278	11	–	20	.355
Arkansas State	4	–	14	.222	13	–	20	.394
Georgia State	3	–	15	.167	10	–	21	.323
† 2023 Sun Belt Tournament winner

The 2022–23 South Alabama Jaguars men's basketball team represented the University of South Alabama in the 2022–23 NCAA Division I men's basketball season. The Jaguars, led by fifth-year head coach Richie Riley, played their home games at the Mitchell Center in Mobile, Alabama as members in the Sun Belt Conference.

== Previous season ==
The Jaguars finished the 2021–22 season 21–12, 9–7 in Sun Belt play to finish in fifth place. In the Sun Belt tournament, they lost in the first round to Little Rock in the first round. They were invited to the 2022 The Basketball Classic where they Southeastern Louisiana in the first round and USC Upstate in the quarterfinals before losing to Sun Belt member Coastal Carolina in the semifinals.

== Offseason ==
=== Departures ===
Name	Number	Pos.	Height	Weight	Year	Hometown	Reason for departure
Lance Thomas	1	F	6'9"	224	GS Senior	Norcross, GA	Left the team for personal reasons
Andrew Anderson	3	G	6'0"	160	Sophomore	Memphis, TN	Transferred to Copiah–Lincoln CC
Kayo Goncalves	4	F	6'8"	212	GS Senior	Rio de Janeiro, Brazil	Graduated
Alex Anderson	12	F	6'6"	185	Freshman	Memphis, TN	Transferred to Alabama State
Javon Franklin	13	F	6'7"	220	Senior	Little Rock, AR	Graduate transferred to Georgia Tech
Charles Manning Jr.	21	G	6'4"	193	Senior	Riverhead, NY	Graduated
Jay Jay Chandler	22	G	6'4"	180	GS Senior	Katy, TX	Graduated
Jamal West	25	F	6'5"	224	Sophomore	Baltimore, MD	Transferred to Clarendon College

=== Incoming transfers ===
Name	Number	Pos.	Height	Weight	Year	Hometown	Previous School
Elijah Ormiston	3	F	6'8"	210	Sophomore	Easley, SC	Concordia Saint Paul
Isaiah Moore	4	G	5'11"	163	Senior	Temple Hills, MD	Franklin Pierce
Kevin Samuel	21	C	6'11"	255	GS Senior	Codrington, Barbuda	Florida Gulf Coast
Owen White	22	G	6'6"	215	GS Senior	Rhinelander, WI	Michigan Tech
Judah Brown	25	F	6'6"	205	Junior	Bermuda Dunes, CA	Saint Mary's

=== Recruiting classes ===
==== 2022 recruiting class ====
College recruiting information
Name	Hometown	School	Height	Weight	Commit date
Jamar Franklin; CG	Rockledge, FL	Rockledge High School	6 ft 2 in (1.88 m)	170 lb (77 kg)	Nov 10, 2021
Jamar Franklin; CG	Recruit ratings: No ratings found				
Julian Margrave; PF	New Hampton, NH	New Hampton School	6 ft 9 in (2.06 m)	205 lb (93 kg)	Nov 10, 2021
Julian Margrave; PF	Recruit ratings: No ratings found				
Overall recruit ranking:
Note: In many cases, Scout, Rivals, 247Sports, On3, and ESPN may conflict in their listings of height and weight.; In these cases, the average was taken. ESPN grades are on a 100-point scale.; Sources: "2022 Team Ranking". Rivals.

==== 2023 recruiting class ====
College recruiting information (2023)
Name	Hometown	School	Height	Weight	Commit date
John Broom; SG	Jacksonville, AL	Jacksonville School	6 ft 5 in (1.96 m)	170 lb (77 kg)	Jul 28, 2022
John Broom; SG	Recruit ratings: 247Sports:				
Smurf Millender; PG	Friendswood, TX	Clear Brook High School	5 ft 9 in (1.75 m)	160 lb (73 kg)	Jun 10, 2022
Smurf Millender; PG	Recruit ratings: No ratings found				
Ethan Kizer; SF	Metamora, IL	Metamora High School	6 ft 5 in (1.96 m)	175 lb (79 kg)	Sep 9, 2022
Ethan Kizer; SF	Recruit ratings: No ratings found				
Overall recruit ranking:
Note: In many cases, Scout, Rivals, 247Sports, On3, and ESPN may conflict in their listings of height and weight.; In these cases, the average was taken. ESPN grades are on a 100-point scale.; Sources: "2023 Team Ranking". Rivals.

== Preseason ==
=== Preseason Sun Belt Conference poll ===
The Jaguars were picked to finish in third place in the conference's preseason poll. Graduate center Kevin Samuel was named to the preseason All-SBC First Team. Graduate guard Greg Parham II was named to the conference preseason second team.

Coaches poll
Predicted finish	Team (1st place Votes)
1	Louisiana - 190 (10)
2	Texas State - 162 (1)
3	South Alabama - 150 (1)
4	James Madison - 149 (1)
5	Georgia State - 127 (1)
6	Marshall - 122
7	App State - 120
8	Coastal Carolina - 100
9	Old Dominion - 93
10	Troy - 76
11	Georgia Southern - 69
12	Arkansas State - 48
13	Southern Miss - 34
14	ULM - 30

== Roster ==
2022–23 South Alabama Jaguars men's basketball team
Players
Coaches

Pos.	#	Name	Height	Weight	Year	Previous school	Hometown
G	0	Tyrell Jones	6 ft 2 in (1.88 m)	190 lb (86 kg)	Jr	West Oaks Academy (FL); Auburn	Chicago, IL
G	1	Jamar Franklin	6 ft 2 in (1.88 m)	175 lb (79 kg)	Fr	Rockledge HS	Rockledge, FL
G	2	Greg Parham II	6 ft 4 in (1.93 m)	195 lb (88 kg)	GS	Monacan HS; VMI	Richmond, VA
F	3	Elijah Ormiston	6 ft 8 in (2.03 m)	220 lb (100 kg)	So	Cannon HS; Concordia-St. Paul	Minneapolis, MN
G	4	Isaiah Moore	6 ft 1 in (1.85 m)	190 lb (86 kg)	GS	Flint Hill HS; Franklin Pierce	Temple Hills, MD
F	10	Diante Smith	6 ft 7 in (2.01 m)	200 lb (91 kg)	Jr	Choctawhatchee HS; TCU	Fort Walton Beach, FL
F	12	Julian Margrave	6 ft 10 in (2.08 m)	205 lb (93 kg)	Fr	New Hampton School	Louisburg, KS
G	14	Adam Sizemore (W)	5 ft 10 in (1.78 m)	170 lb (77 kg)	Sr	North Laurel HS	London, KY
F	20	Marshall Kearing	6 ft 9 in (2.06 m)	230 lb (104 kg)	Jr	Willetton Senior HS; State College of Florida	Pinjarra, Australia
C	21	Kevin Samuel	7 ft 0 in (2.13 m)	260 lb (118 kg)	GS	Redemption Christian Academy (TX); Florida Gulf Coast	Codrington Village, Barbuda
G	22	Owen White	6 ft 6 in (1.98 m)	215 lb (98 kg)	GS	Rhinelander HS; Michigan Tech	Rhinelander, WI
F	24	Tyler Shirley	6 ft 7 in (2.01 m)	205 lb (93 kg)	So	Pebblebrook HS	Gary, IN
F	25	Judah Brown	6 ft 6 in (1.98 m)	225 lb (102 kg)	Jr	Pacifica Christian HS; Saint Mary's	Bermuda Dunes, CA

Head coach

- Richie Riley (Eastern Kentucky)

Assistant coach(es)

- Rodney Crawford (Cincinnati)
- Tyler Parker (Faulkner)
- Orin Bailey, Jr.(Houston)

Legend

- (C) Team captain
- (S) Suspended
- (I) Ineligible
- (W) Walk-on
- Injured
- Current redshirt

Roster

== Schedule and results ==
Date time, TV	Rank^{#}	Opponent^{#}	Result	Record	High points	High rebounds	High assists	Site (attendance) city, state
Non-conference regular season
November 9, 2022*; 7:00 p.m., ESPN+		Mobile	W 97–59	1–0	18 – Franklin	12 – Samuel	5 – Moore	Mitchell Center (2,019); Mobile, AL
November 11, 2022*; 8:00 p.m., MW Network		at New Mexico	L 74–80	1–1	19 – Moore	7 – Tied	13 – Moore	The Pit (9,466); Albuquerque, NM
November 15, 2022*; 9:00 p.m., ESPNU		No. 18 Alabama	L 55–65	1–2	20 – Moore	11 – Kearing	1 – Tied	Mitchell Center (7,673); Mobile, AL
November 18, 2022*; 7:00 p.m., ESPN+		at Oklahoma	L 60–64	1–3	25 – Moore	9 – Samuel	3 – Parham II	Lloyd Noble Center (5,403); Norman, OK
November 25, 2022*; 5:30 p.m.		vs. Evansville; Hostilo Hoops Community Classic	W 78–67	2–3	21 – Moore	8 – Samuel	9 – Moore	Enmarket Arena (219); Savannah, GA
November 26, 2022*; 1:30 p.m.		vs. Towson; Hostilo Hoops Community Classic	L 60–62	2–4	18 – Moore	9 – Samuel	6 – Moore	Enmarket Arena (233); Savannah, GA
November 27, 2022*; 1:30 p.m.		vs. Robert Morris; Hostilo Hoops Community Classic	W 84–70	3–4	28 – Moore	12 – Samuel	4 – Moore	Enmarket Arena (207); Savannah, GA
November 30, 2022*; 6:00 p.m., CUSA.tv		at Florida Atlantic	L 59–84	3–5	17 – Moore	5 – Parham II	5 – Moore	Eleanor R. Baldwin Arena (1,303); Boca Raton, FL
December 4, 2022*; 1:00 p.m., ESPNU		at UAB	L 68–76	3–6	30 – Parham II	14 – Samuel	3 – Parham II	Bartow Arena (3,833); Birmingham, AL
December 12, 2022*; 6:00 p.m., YouTube		at Alabama A&M	W 78–71	4–6	20 – Samuel	8 – Tied	5 – Tied	Alabama A&M Events Center (451); Huntsville, AL
December 19, 2022*; 7:00 p.m., ESPN+		Spring Hill	W 82–53	5–6	18 – Parham II	12 – Samuel	4 – Moore	Mitchell Center (1,667); Mobile, AL
December 21, 2022*; 1:00 p.m., ESPN+		Jacksonville State	W 71–66	6–6	18 – Jones	9 – Samuel	4 – Tied	Mitchell Center (1,455); Mobile, AL
Sun Belt Conference regular season
December 29, 2022; 7:00 p.m., ESPN+		at Georgia Southern	L 50–64	6–7 (0–1)	15 – Moore	7 – Samuel	5 – Moore	Hanner Fieldhouse (957); Statesboro, GA
December 31, 2022; 1:00 p.m., ESPN+		at Georgia State	L 58–68	6–8 (0–2)	15 – Parham II	11 – Samuel	4 – Tied	GSU Convocation Center (1,306); Atlanta, GA
January 5, 2023; 7:00 p.m., ESPN+		Arkanasas State	W 63–45	7–8 (1–2)	20 – Moore	11 – Samuel	3 – Tied	Mitchell Center (1,451); Mobile, AL
January 7, 2023; 2:00 p.m., ESPN+		Texas State	L 58–64	7–9 (1–3)	16 – Samuel	13 – Samuel	5 – Moore	Mitchell Center (1,812); Mobile, AL
January 12, 2023; 7:00 p.m., ESPN+		James Madison	W 63–62	8–9 (2–3)	16 – Moore	9 – Samuel	5 – Moore	Mitchell Center (1,725); Mobile, AL
January 14, 2023; 3:00 p.m., ESPN+		Louisiana	L 76–79	8–10 (2–4)	21 – Moore	7 – Kearing	6 – Moore	Mitchell Center (2,246); Mobile, AL
January 19, 2023; 7:00 p.m., ESPN+		at Southern Miss	L 72–76	8–11 (2–5)	22 – Moore	11 – Samuel	4 – Jones	Reed Green Coliseum (4,128); Hattiesburg, MS
January 21, 2023; 1:00 p.m., ESPN+		at Coastal Carolina	L 81–85 ^{OT}	8–12 (2–6)	25 – Jones	10 – Samuel	9 – Moore	HTC Center (1,459); Conway, SC
January 26, 2023; 7:00 p.m., ESPN+		Old Dominion	L 64–66	8–13 (2–7)	19 – Moore	7 – Brown	3 – Tied	Mitchell Center (1,894); Mobile, AL
January 28, 2023; 3:00 p.m., ESPN+		Troy	W 77–60	9–13 (3–7)	23 – Moore	13 – Samuel	3 – Jones	Mitchell Center (2,779); Mobile, AL
February 2, 2023; 7:00 p.m., ESPN+		at Arkansas State	W 82–62	10–13 (4–7)	23 – Moore	7 – Tied	4 – Jones	First National Bank Arena (1,341); Jonesboro, AR
February 4, 2023; 2:00 p.m., ESPN+		at Louisiana–Monroe	W 72–64	11–13 (5–7)	31 – Moore	6 – Tied	4 – Moore	Fant–Ewing Coliseum (3,023); Monroe, LA
February 9, 2023; 7:15 p.m., ESPN+		at Troy	L 57–61	11–14 (5–8)	16 – Brown	13 – Samuel	4 – Moore	Trojan Arena (4,014); Troy, AL
February 11, 2023; 5:00 p.m., ESPN+		Appalachian State	W 74–57	12–14 (6–8)	16 – Moore	9 – Samuel	3 – Tied	Mitchell Center (1,955); Mobile, AL
February 13, 2023*; 7:00 p.m., ESPN+		Hartford	W 77–53	13–14	20 – Moore	10 – Samuel	5 – Moore	Mitchell Center (1,404); Mobile, AL
February 16, 2023; 7:00 p.m., ESPN+		Southern Miss	W 85–54	14–14 (7–8)	16 – Moore	6 – Samuel	6 – Moore	Mitchell Center (2,398); Mobile, AL
February 18, 2023; 3:00 p.m., ESPN+		Louisiana–Monroe	W 81–45	15–14 (8–8)	19 – Parham II	9 – White	5 – Parham II	Mitchell Center (1,702); Mobile, AL
February 22, 2023; 7:00 p.m., ESPN+		at Texas State	W 76–67	16–14 (9–8)	22 – Moore	10 – Samuel	7 – Moore	Strahan Coliseum (1,776); San Marcos, TX
February 24, 2023; 8:00 p.m., ESPN2		at Louisiana	L 64–74	16–15 (9–9)	22 – Moore	7 – Brown	3 – Moore	Cajundome (3,494); Lafayette, LA
Sun Belt tournament
March 2, 2023; 11:30 a.m., ESPN+	(8)	vs. (9) Appalachian State; Second Round	W 68–61	17–15	20 – Moore	15 – Samuel	7 – Moore	Pensacola Bay Center (718); Pensacola, FL
March 4, 2023; 11:30 a.m., ESPN+	(8)	vs. (1) Southern Miss; Quarterfinals	W 78–61	18–15	23 – White	6 – White	7 – Moore	Pensacola Bay Center; Pensacola, FL
March 5, 2023; 5:00 p.m., ESPN+	(8)	vs. (4) James Madison; Semifinals	W 75–66	19–15	18 – Moore	12 – Samuel	5 – Moore	Pensacola Bay Center; Pensacola, FL
March 6, 2023; 6:00 p.m., ESPN2	(8)	vs. (2) Louisiana; Championship	L 66–71	19–16	33 – Moore	10 – Jones	4 – Jones	Pensacola Bay Center; Pensacola, FL
*Non-conference game. ^{#}Rankings from AP Poll. (#) Tournament seedings in parentheses. All times are in Central.
