= 2022–23 Georgia Southern Eagles men's basketball team =

College basketball team season

2022–23 Georgia Southern Eagles men's basketball
- Conference: Sun Belt Conference
- Record: 17–16 (9–9 Sun Belt)
- Head coach: Brian Burg (3rd season)
- Associate head coach: Chris Shumate
- Assistant coaches: Tim MacAllister; Glynn Cyprien
- Home arena: Hanner Fieldhouse

2022–23 Sun Belt Conference men's basketball standings
	Conf.				Overall
Team	W		L	PCT	W		L	PCT
Southern Miss	14	–	4	.778	25	–	8	.758
Louisiana †	13	–	5	.722	26	–	8	.765
Marshall	13	–	5	.722	24	–	8	.750
James Madison	12	–	6	.667	22	–	11	.667
Troy	11	–	7	.611	20	–	13	.606
Old Dominion	11	–	7	.611	19	–	12	.613
Georgia Southern	9	–	9	.500	17	–	16	.515
South Alabama	9	–	9	.500	19	–	16	.543
Appalachian State	9	–	9	.500	16	–	16	.500
Louisiana–Monroe	7	–	11	.389	11	–	21	.344
Texas State	6	–	12	.333	16	–	19	.457
Coastal Carolina	5	–	13	.278	11	–	20	.355
Arkansas State	4	–	14	.222	13	–	20	.394
Georgia State	3	–	15	.167	10	–	21	.323
† 2023 Sun Belt Tournament winner

The 2022–23 Georgia Southern Eagles men's basketball team represented Georgia Southern University in the 2022–23 NCAA Division I men's basketball season. The Eagles, led by second-year head coach Brian Burg, played their home games at Hanner Fieldhouse in Statesboro, Georgia as members of the Sun Belt Conference. They finished the season 17–16, 9–9 in Sun Belt play, to finish in a three-way tie for seventh place. As the No. 7 seed in the Sun Belt tournament, they defeated Louisiana–Monroe in the second round before losing to Louisiana in the quarterfinals.

On March 9, 2023, the school fired head coach Brian Burg. On March 29, the school named Alabama assistant coach Charlie Henry the team's new head coach.

== Previous season ==
The Eagles finished the 2020–21 season 13–16, 5–11 in Sun Belt play, to finish in 10th place. They defeated Coastal Carolina in the first round of the Sun Belt tournament before losing to Appalachian State in the quarterfinals.

== Offseason ==
=== Departures ===
Name	Number	Pos.	Height	Weight	Year	Hometown	Reason for departure
Elijah McCadden	2	G	6'4"	205	Senior	Rocky Mount, NC	Graduate transferred to Memphis
Tre Cobbs	3	G	6'0"	190	RS Senior	Lima, OH	Graduated
Gedi Juozapaitis	13	G/F	6'4"	210	Senior	London, England	Graduate transferred to Maine
Grant Weatherford	23	G	6'2"	195	RS Senior	Cicero, IN	Graduated
Prince Toyambi	24	F/C	6'7"	230	RS Junior	Kinshasa, DR Congo	Left the team for personal reasons

=== Transfers ===
Name	Number	Pos.	Height	Weight	Year	Hometown	Previous school
Jalen Finch	2	G	6'1"	165	Senior	Raleigh, NC	Jacksonville State
Tyren Moore	3	G	6'1"	180	Junior	Louisville, KY	Moberly Area CC
Tai Stickland	13	G	6'2"	180	RS Senior	Tampa, FL	Temple

=== Recruiting classes ===
==== 2022 recruiting class ====
College recruiting information
Name	Hometown	School	Height	Weight	Commit date
Nate Brafford; SF	Rabun Gap, GA	Rabun Gap-Nacoochee School	6 ft 8 in (2.03 m)	170 lb (77 kg)	Apr 7, 2022
Nate Brafford; SF	Recruit ratings: No ratings found				
Overall recruit ranking:
Note: In many cases, Scout, Rivals, 247Sports, On3, and ESPN may conflict in their listings of height and weight.; In these cases, the average was taken. ESPN grades are on a 100-point scale.; Sources: "Georgia Southern 2022-23 Basketball Commits". ESPN.; "2022-23 Team Ranking". Rivals.

==== 2023 recruiting class ====
College recruiting information (2023)
Name	Hometown	School	Height	Weight	Commit date
Eren Banks; CG	Eatonton, GA	Putnam County High School	6 ft 3 in (1.91 m)	180 lb (82 kg)	May 7, 2022
Eren Banks; CG	Recruit ratings: No ratings found				
Collin Kuhl; PF	Holly Springs, NC	Holly Springs High School	6 ft 8 in (2.03 m)	195 lb (88 kg)	Aug 28, 2022
Collin Kuhl; PF	Recruit ratings: No ratings found				
Avantae Parker; PF	Columbia, SC	Gray Academy	6 ft 8 in (2.03 m)	200 lb (91 kg)	Sep 7, 2022
Avantae Parker; PF	Recruit ratings: No ratings found				
Luke Wilson; C	Augusta, GA	Augusta Christian School	6 ft 9 in (2.06 m)	280 lb (130 kg)	Nov 12, 2022
Luke Wilson; C	Recruit ratings: No ratings found				
Overall recruit ranking:
Note: In many cases, Scout, Rivals, 247Sports, On3, and ESPN may conflict in their listings of height and weight.; In these cases, the average was taken. ESPN grades are on a 100-point scale.; Sources: "Georgia Southern 2023-24 Basketball Commits". ESPN.; "2023-24 Team Ranking". Rivals.

== Preseason ==
=== Preseason Sun Belt Conference poll ===
The Eagles were picked to finish in 11th place in the conference's preseason poll.

Coaches poll
Predicted finish	Team (first-place votes)
1	Louisiana – 190 (10)
2	Texas State – 162 (1)
3	South Alabama – 150 (1)
4	James Madison – 149 (1)
5	Georgia State – 127 (1)
6	Marshall – 122
7	Appalachian State – 120
8	Coastal Carolina – 100
9	Old Dominion – 93
10	Troy – 76
11	Georgia Southern – 69
12	Arkansas State – 48
13	Southern Miss – 34
14	ULM – 30

== Roster ==
2022–23 Georgia Southern Eagles men's basketball team
Players
Coaches

Pos.	#	Name	Height	Weight	Year	Previous school	Hometown
G/F	0	Kaden Archie	6 ft 6 in (1.98 m)	205 lb (93 kg)	Sr	Midlothian; UTEP	Dallas, TX
G/F	1	Cam Bryant	6 ft 7 in (2.01 m)	215 lb (98 kg)	So	Dutchtwon	Camilla, GA
G	2	Jalen Finch	6 ft 1 in (1.85 m)	165 lb (75 kg)	Jr	Broughton; Jacksonville State	Raleigh, NC
G	3	Tyren Moore	5 ft 11 in (1.8 m)	185 lb (84 kg)	Jr	Louisville Male; Moberly Area CC	Louisville, KY
G	4	Kamari Brown	6 ft 3 in (1.91 m)	190 lb (86 kg)	GS	Chiles; Panola College	Tallahassee, FL
G	5	Derrick Harris Jr.	6 ft 3 in (1.91 m)	180 lb (82 kg)	RS Fr	Mitchell County	Camilla, GA
F	10	Carlos Curry	6 ft 11 in (2.11 m)	240 lb (109 kg)	RS Sr	Dougherty Comprehensive; Northwest Mississippi CC	Albany, GA
F	11	Mackenzie McFatten	6 ft 8 in (2.03 m)	210 lb (95 kg)	RS Jr	Coffee	Douglas, GA
F	12	Andrei Savrasov	6 ft 7 in (2.01 m)	225 lb (102 kg)	RS Sr	BC Zenit; Texas Tech	St. Petersburg, Russia
G	13	Tai Strickland	6 ft 2 in (1.88 m)	180 lb (82 kg)	RS Sr	St. Petersburg; Temple	Tampa, FL
G	14	Donovan Stocks	6 ft 3 in (1.91 m)	185 lb (84 kg)	RS Fr	Covington Catholic	Cincinnati, OH
G	21	Amar Augillard	6 ft 4 in (1.93 m)	210 lb (95 kg)	RS Fr	Zion-Benton	Zion, IL
F	23	Nate Brafford	6 ft 9 in (2.06 m)	180 lb (82 kg)	Fr	Rabun Gap-Nacoochee	Waynesville, NC
F	24	Luke Keller (W)	6 ft 7 in (2.01 m)	225 lb (102 kg)	Fr	North Gwinnett	Suwanee, GA
G	34	Braxton Tucker (W)	6 ft 2 in (1.88 m)	185 lb (84 kg)	Fr	Riverwood International Charter	Atlanta, GA

Head coach

- Brian Burg (UNC Wilmington)

Assistant coach(es)

- Chris Shumate (Murray State)
- Tim MacAllister (Murray State)
- Glynn Cyprien (Southern–New Orleans)

Legend

- (C) Team captain
- (S) Suspended
- (I) Ineligible
- (W) Walk-on
- Injured
- Current redshirt

Roster
Last update: July 10, 2024

== Schedule and results ==
Date time, TV	Rank^{#}	Opponent^{#}	Result	Record	High points	High rebounds	High assists	Site (attendance) city, state
Non-conference regular season
November 8, 2022*; 10:00 p.m., MWN		at San Jose State	L 48–63	0–1	14 – Savrasov	8 – Curry	2 – Brown	Provident Credit Union Event Center (2,241); San Jose, CA
November 10, 2022*; 10:00 p.m., WCC Network		at Santa Clara	L 62–78	0–2	19 – Archie	6 – Finch	6 – Finch	Leavey Center (1,152); Santa Clara, CA
November 12, 2022*; 7:00 p.m., ESPN+		Trinity Baptist	W 53–32	1–2	16 – Savrasov	11 – Savrasov	2 – tied	Hanner Fieldhouse (1,328); Statesboro, GA
November 18, 2022*; 7:00 p.m., CUSATV		at Rice; Owl Invitational	L 71–88	1–3	15 – Strickland	6 – Curry	4 – tied	Tudor Fieldhouse (1,401); Houston, TX
November 19, 2022*; 8:00 p.m., ESPN+		vs. Houston Christian; Owl Invitational	W 84–77	2–3	15 – Savrasov	6 – Finch	8 – Finch	Tudor Fieldhouse (608); Houston, TX
November 20, 2022*; 1:00 p.m.		vs. Western Michigan; Owl Invitational	W 63–57	3–3	16 – Curry	8 – tied	4 – Finch	Tudor Fieldhouse (1,267); Houston, TX
November 26, 2022*; 1:00 p.m., ESPN+		Oglethorpe	W 101–73	4–3	30 – Curry	15 – Curry	6 – Finch	Hanner Fieldhouse (512); Statesboro, GA
November 30, 2022*; 7:30 p.m., ESPN+		Florida Gulf Coast	L 53–70	4–4	16 – Finch	5 – tied	3 – tied	Hanner Fieldhouse (1,423); Statesboro, GA
December 7, 2022*; 7:00 p.m., ESPN+		Piedmont	W 91–47	5–4	20 – Curry	12 – Curry	3 – tied	Hanner Fieldhouse (724); Statesboro, GA
December 10, 2022*; 3:00 p.m., ESPN+		Wofford	W 79–57	6–4	16 – Finch	7 – Savrasov	2 – Moore	Hanner Fieldhouse (545); Statesboro, GA
December 14, 2022*; 7:00 p.m., ESPN+		Morehead State	L 71–74	6–5	22 – Savasov	12 – Savrasov	3 – Finch	Hanner Fieldhouse (501); Statesboro, GA
December 17, 2022*; 3:00 p.m., ESPN+		Campbell	W 54–53	7–5	13 – Moore	12 – Curry	3 – Finch	Hanner Fieldhouse (573); Statesboro, GA
December 21, 2022*; 7:00 p.m., ESPN+		at Ball State	L 54–58	7–6	13 – tied	11 – Curry	1 – tied	Worthen Arena (3,288); Muncie, IN
Sun Belt Conference regular season
December 29, 2022; 8:00 p.m., ESPN+		South Alabama	W 64–50	8–6 (1–0)	14 – Finch	12 – Brown	5 – Finch	Hanner Fieldhouse (957); Statesboro, GA
December 31, 2022; 2:00 p.m., ESPN+		at Coastal Carolina	W 73–64	9–6 (2–0)	16 – tied	8 – Savrasov	4 – Finch	HTC Center (1,201); Conway, SC
January 5, 2023; 7:00 p.m., ESPN+		Marshall	W 81–76	10–6 (3–0)	18 – Savrasov	8 – Curry	8 – Finch	Hanner Fieldhouse (1,009); Statesboro, GA
January 7, 2023; 3:00 p.m., ESPN+		Old Dominion	L 75–81 ^{OT}	10–7 (3–1)	18 – Archie	9 – Savrasov	4 – Finch	Hanner Fieldhouse (1,412); Statesboro, GA
January 12, 2023; 6:30 p.m., ESPN+		at Appalachian State	W 67–65	11–7 (4–1)	21 – Savrasov	11 – Savrasov	2 – tied	Holmes Center (1,651); Boone, NC
January 14, 2023; 7:00 p.m., ESPN+		at James Madison	L 71–83	11–8 (4–2)	14 – Savrasov	9 – Savrasov	4 – Finch	Atlantic Union Bank Center (3,787); Harrisonburg, VA
January 19, 2023; 7:00 p.m., ESPN+		Louisiana–Monroe	L 59–72	11–9 (4–3)	15 – Archie	5 – tied	4 – Savrasov	Hanner Fieldhouse (1,553); Statesboro, GA
January 21, 2023; 3:00 p.m., ESPN+		Georgia State; Rivalry	W 58–52	12–9 (5–3)	15 – Finch	7 – Brown	2 – tied	Hanner Fieldhouse (2,672); Statesboro, GA
January 26, 2023; 8:00 p.m., ESPN+		at Texas State	L 67–70	12–10 (5–4)	19 – Moore	7 – Curry	2 – tied	Strahan Coliseum (2,331); San Marcos, TX
January 28, 2023; 8:00 p.m., ESPN+		at Louisiana	L 87–94	12–11 (5–5)	16 – tied	9 – Curry	2 – tied	Cajundome (3,504); Lafayette, LA
February 2, 2023; 7:00 p.m., ESPN+		at Georgia State; Rivalry	L 60–64	12–12 (5–6)	16 – Finch	12 – Savrosov	3 – tied	GSU Convocation Center (3,309); Atlanta, GA
February 4, 2023; 7:00 p.m., ESPN+		at Old Dominion	L 58–64	12–13 (5–7)	11 – tied	13 – Curry	5 – Finch	Chartway Arena (7,029); Norfolk, VA
February 9, 2023; 7:00 p.m., ESPN+		James Madison	W 76–73	13–13 (6–7)	22 – Savrasov	10 – Savrasov	7 – Finch	Hanner Fieldhouse (1,863); Statesboro, GA
February 11, 2023; 3:00 p.m., ESPN+		Arkansas State	W 68–53	14–13 (7–7)	24 – Savrasov	12 – Savrasov	4 – Finch	Hanner Fieldhouse (1,727); Statesboro, GA
February 16, 2023; 7:00 p.m., ESPN+		at Marshall	L 83–84	14–14 (7–8)	20 – Savrasov	10 – Brown	3 – Finch	Cam Henderson Center (5,711); Huntington, WV
February 18, 2023; 1:00 p.m., ESPN+		at Southern Miss	L 62–73	14–15 (7–9)	14 – Moore	7 – Curry	4 – Finch	Reed Green Coliseum (488); Hattiesburg, MS
February 22, 2023; 7:00 p.m., ESPN+		Coastal Carolina	W 76–68	15–15 (8–9)	14 – Brown	11 – Savrasov	6 – Finch	Hanner Fieldhouse (1,283); Statesboro, GA
February 24, 2023; 7:00 p.m., ESPN+		Appalachian State	W 73–64	16–15 (9–9)	28 – Savrasov	5 – tied	6 – Archie	Hanner Fieldhouse (2,445); Statesboro, GA
Sun Belt tournament
March 2, 2023; 8:30 p.m., ESPN+	(7)	vs. (10) Louisiana–Monroe; Second round	W 66–57	17–15	16 – Moore	9 – Brown	5 – Finch	Pensacola Bay Center (940); Pensacola, FL
March 4, 2023; 8:30 p.m., ESPN+	(7)	vs. (2) Louisiana; Quarterfinals	L 49–67	17–16	15 – Savrasov	7 – Savrasov	1 – tied	Pensacola Bay Center; Pensacola, FL
*Non-conference game. ^{#}Rankings from AP poll. (#) Tournament seedings in parentheses. All times are in Eastern.
