= Cliff Ellis =

American college basketball coach (born 1945)

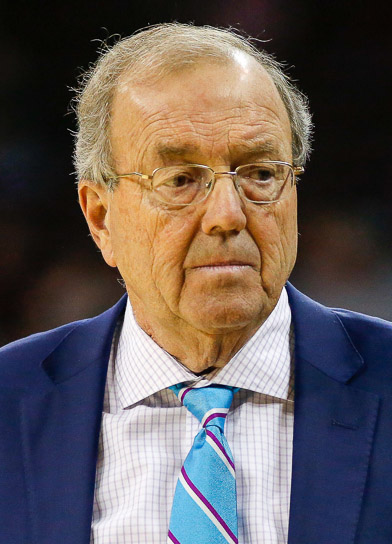
- Ellis in 2018

Biographical details
- Born: December 5, 1945 (age 80); Marianna, Florida, U.S.
- Education: Florida State; Middle Tennessee State

Coaching career (HC unless noted)
- 1968–1969: Ruckel JHS (FL) (assistant)
- 1969–1971: Niceville HS (FL) (assistant)
- 1971–1972: Vanguard HS (FL)
- 1972–1975: Cumberland (TN)
- 1975–1984: South Alabama
- 1984–1994: Clemson
- 1994–2004: Auburn
- 2007–2023: Coastal Carolina

Administrative career (AD unless noted)
- 1972–1975: Cumberland (TN)

Head coaching record
- Overall: 831–563 (.596); 78–12 (.867) (NAIA)
- Tournaments: 8–10 (NCAA Division I); 10–13 (NIT); 3–2 (CIT); 8–4 (CBI); 3–1 (TBC)

Accomplishments and honors

Championships
- 3 Sun Belt regular season (1979–1981); ACC regular season (1990); SEC regular season (1999); 3 Big South regular season (2010, 2011, 2014); 2 Big South tournament (2014, 2015)

Awards
- AP Coach of the Year (1999); Henry Iba Award (1999); Sun Belt Coach of the Year (1979); 2× ACC Coach of the Year (1987, 1990); 2× SEC Coach of the Year (1995, 1999); Big South Coach of the Year (2010)

Cliff Ellis (born December 5, 1945) is an American former college basketball coach, who finished his career as the head coach at Coastal Carolina University. Ellis finished his career as the fourth winningest coach in NCAA Division I history.

Ellis is a member of four Halls of Fame after entering the Alabama Sports Hall of Fame in 2021 and Clemson's in 2013. He was already part of the Mobile Sports and Cumberland University Halls of Fame.

Ellis has compiled a Division I record of 828–559 (.597) and an overall record of 906–571 (.613). He ranks third in NCAA Division I wins among active coaches. He is also just one of four coaches in NCAA Division I history to make multiple NCAA Tournament appearances with four separate schools and has been named conference Coach of the Year six times in his career. He is the only coach in NCAA Division I history to win at least 170 games at four different institutions.

As of the end of the 2022–23 season, he is the all-time leader in NCAA Division I wins for basketball coaches who have coached in the state of South Carolina. He has 471 wins with Clemson (177) and Coastal Carolina (294). Former South Carolina head coach, Frank McGuire, is a distant second with 283 wins.

With a victory over UNC Asheville on February 3, 2015, Ellis became the only coach in NCAA Division I history to tally 150-plus wins at four institutions. He was national coach of the year in 1999 at Auburn, when his Tigers won 29 games and captured the school's first SEC championship in 40 years. In 1990, he coached Clemson to its only ACC regular-season first-place finish. His South Alabama teams won Sun Belt Conference regular-season championships in 1979, 1980, and 1981. At both Clemson and South Alabama he holds school records for coaching victories, and he is the second-winningest coach at both Auburn and Coastal Carolina.

== Early life and education ==
Ellis was born in Marianna, Florida. He graduated from Florida State University in 1968 with a bachelor's degree in physical education and has a master's degree (1972) in the same subject from Middle Tennessee State University.

== Coaching career ==
=== High school ===
Ellis began his coaching career in 1968 at Ruckel Junior High School in Niceville, Florida. The following year, he moved to Niceville High School as the head football and junior varsity basketball coach. He led his football team to an undefeated season in 1969. NHS's varsity coach Ron Shumate left after the 1969–70 season, but Ellis was passed over for the head coaching position because the Okaloosa County School District superintendent felt he was too young to for the job. After he was rejected for another head coaching job in the district (Choctawhatchee High School) in 1971, Ellis left Okaloosa County to become the head boy's basketball coach at Vanguard High School in Ocala, Florida.

=== College ===
==== Cumberland Junior College ====
Ellis was head coach and athletic director at Cumberland University in Lebanon, Tennessee from 1972 to 1975. He won two TJCAA Championships and finished 4th nationally in the final 1973–74 regular season NJCAA poll. Ellis compiled a 78–12 record at Cumberland. The basketball playing surface in the Dallas Floyd Phoenix Arena at Cumberland was named in his honor on August 17, 2018.

==== South Alabama ====
Ellis was the head coach at the University of South Alabama from 1975 to 1984. He is the all-time winningest coach in South Alabama history with a 171–84 record during nine seasons. When Ellis became head coach, the administrators at South Alabama were thinking of dropping to NCAA Division II. Four years later, he had the Jaguars in the NCAA tournament and six seasons later, they were ranked in the nation's top 10.

Ellis, who was also the athletic director during part of his tenure, led the Jaguars to three Sun Belt titles, two NCAA Tournament appearances, and two NITs.

==== Clemson ====
On April 3, 1984, the former South Alabama coach was named the head basketball coach at Clemson University. In 10 years at Clemson, Ellis led the Tigers to postseason play eight times, including three NCAA Tournaments. His best team was the 1989–90 unit, which tallied the only Atlantic Coast Conference regular-season title in school history and made it all the way to the Sweet Sixteen — the second-deepest NCAA Tournament run in school history. He was a two-time ACC Coach of the Year (1987 and 1990).

==== Auburn ====
Ellis led the Tigers to the 1999 SEC Championship with a 29–4 record, at that time the most wins ever recorded by a Division I team in the state of Alabama. The Tigers reached the Sweet 16 in 1998–99 and in 2002–03 under Ellis. Ellis coached Auburn to what were, at the time, the top three single-season victory marks in school history, with the 1998–99 season, the 1999–2000 season when Auburn went 24–10, and the 2002–03 season where Auburn went 22–12.

Ellis claimed his 500th career Division I coaching victory in a 100–71 win over Georgia State November 26, 2002, to become only the 34th coach to reach the milestone since the NCAA started Division I play in 1948–49.

A year after going to the Sweet 16, Ellis' Tigers regressed to an overall .500 record and a losing conference record. Auburn fired him after that season. He remained in the Auburn community, where his wife Carolyn ran for a state legislature seat in 2006. His 186 wins are the third-most in Auburn history, behind only Joel Eaves and Bruce Pearl.

==== Coastal Carolina ====
On Monday, July 2, 2007, Ellis was named Coastal Carolina's head basketball coach.

While at Coastal Carolina, Ellis has amassed a pair of Big South regular-season championships and two conference tournament titles, making him one of only two coaches in NCAA history to win conference titles at four different institutions. Furthermore, Ellis is also one of two coaches to win championships in both the Atlantic Coast Conference and Southeastern Conference.

In the 2009–10 season, he led the Chanticleers to the school's first conference championship since 1990–91. Coastal set new school records for victories in conference play (15) and regular season (26) in the process.

In the 2010–11 season, he led the Chanticleers to the school's second conference championship. Coastal Carolina (28–6) made its second-straight trip to the NIT after earning an automatic bid by winning the Big South regular-season title with a 16–2 mark inside the conference. The Chanticleers opened league play with 15-straight victories and went on to set an all-time Big South record for conference wins in a season. The Chanticleers would eventually hold the nation's longest win streak at 22-straight games.

The 2010–11 season marked the second-straight season that Coastal Carolina captured the Big South regular-season title and the first time since the 1990 and 1991 seasons that the Chanticleers won consecutive league titles.

The Chanticleers were also a perfect 9–0 on the road in conference play in 2010–11 and became just the second team in league history to accomplish that feat. In addition, the Chants were the first team in conference history to win five Big South road games by at least 20 points. Coastal won by 22 at VMI (Jan. 6), 21 at UNC Asheville (Jan. 20), 24 at High Point (Jan. 27), 23 at Radford (Jan. 29), and 20 at Presbyterian (Feb. 10).

Coastal Carolina also became the first team in Big South history to win at least 25 games in back-to-back seasons and owns the conference record for the most wins in consecutive seasons with 56 (2009–2010 through 2010–2011).

In 2011–12, Ellis led the Chants to their first appearance in the CollegeInsider.com Postseason Tournament. Coastal finished the season with a 19–12 record, while going 12–6 in Big South Conference play. Ellis led the Chants to victories over LSU and Clemson during the season, marking the first time in school history that Coastal Carolina had recorded two wins in the same season over Power Five schools. The win over LSU was the second-straight victory for the Chanticleers over the Tigers in as many seasons.

Ellis' 2012–13 campaign featured a season-opening win over perennial mid-major power Akron when the Chants opened their new home, The HTC Center. Coastal also picked up a 69–46 home win over Clemson in late December, giving Ellis back-to-back victories over the Tigers. Ellis led Coastal to a 14–15 overall record in 2012–13 but the Chants were 12–4 at home with a near-perfect 7–1 conference home ledger.

Ellis led the Chants to a 19–12 regular season finish during the 2013–14 season, including an 11–5 conference record earning the Chants' first Big South Conference South Division Championship. Coastal went on to win three-straight games in the VisitMyrtleBeach.com Big South Championship to earn its third Big South Conference tournament Championship and first since 1991. Coastal nearly upset top-seeded Virginia at the NCAA Tournament. The Chants led by as many as 10 points in the first half but a late surge by the Cavaliers gave UVA the victory.

In 2014–15, Ellis guided the Chanticleers to a 21–9 regular-season record, including a 12–6 mark in Big South play to earn the No. 3 seed in the VisitMyrtleBeach.com Big South Basketball Championship. In the league tournament, the Chants rallied for wins over UNC Asheville and Gardner-Webb before running away from Winthrop in the title game to secure a second-straight trip to the NCAA Tournament—a program first. Coastal was seeded 16th in the West Region and faced No. 1-seeded Wisconsin in the NCAA Tournament. The Chants took a pair of early leads over the Badgers, but the eventual national runner-up pulled away for an 86–72 victory.

The 2015–16 season featured a 21–12 overall record (12–6 Big South) as Ellis guided the Chanticleers to a semifinal appearance in the CollegeInsider.com Postseason Tournament. Along the way the Chanticleers earned the program's first, second, and third postseason victories with wins over Mercer, New Hampshire, and Grand Canyon, respectively.

The 2016–17 season featured a 20–19 overall record (10–8 Sun Belt) as Ellis guided the Chanticleers to a championship series appearance in the College Basketball Invitational Postseason Tournament. In the Chanticleers first season in the Sun Belt Conference, they finished with 10 conference wins and advanced to the quarterfinals of the Sun Belt Conference tournament with a win over South Alabama before eventually falling to Texas Arlington. After advancing to the College Basketball Invitational Postseason Tournament, the Chanticleers picked up wins against Hampton, Loyola (MD), and Illinois-Chicago before moving on to the championship series against Wyoming. The Chanticleers won game one of the series before falling in games two and three to finish as runner-up in the CBI Tournament.

The 2018–19 season featured a 17–16 overall record (9–9 Sun Belt) as Ellis guided the Chanticleers to a semifinal appearance in the College Basketball Invitational Postseason Tournament. Along the way, the Chanticleers earned the program's seventh and eighth postseason victories with wins over Howard and West Virginia, respectively.

== Personal life ==
He is a musician, an author, and a gourmet cook. He has even been an ostrich farmer. He and his music group, "the Villagers", were one of the Southeast's hottest acts in the mid-1960s. He has published three books – Zone Press Variations for Winning Basketball, The Complete Book of Fast Break Basketball and Cliff Ellis: The Winning Edge, released in the summer of 2000.

== Humanitarian ==
On April 18, 2019, Cliff Ellis teamed up with former Florida Gator football coach Steve Spurrier and former Florida State Seminoles defensive coordinator Mickey Andrews, who filled in for Legendary former Florida State football coach Bobby Bowden, for a press conference at the Capitol in Tallahassee to show congress that rival coaches can come together and urge lawmakers to send aid and money to the 11 counties that were battered by Hurricane Michael in October 2018. Shortly after the press conference, Florida Governor Ron DeSantis and FDEM (Florida Division of Emergency Management) announced $18.5 million in relief for Bay County.

== Head coaching record ==
Record table
Season	Team	Overall	Conference	Standing	Postseason
Cumberland Bulldogs () (1972–1975)
Cumberland NAIA:		78–12 (.867)			
South Alabama Jaguars (NCAA Division I independent) (1975–1976)
1975–76	South Alabama	18–9			
South Alabama Jaguars (Sun Belt Conference) (1976–1984)
1976–77	South Alabama	17–10	3–3	3rd	
1977–78	South Alabama	18–10	3–7	4th	
1978–79	South Alabama	20–7	10–0	1st	NCAA Division I First Round
1979–80	South Alabama	23–6	12–2	1st	NCAA Division I First Round
1980–81	South Alabama	25–6	9–3	1st	NIT Quarterfinal
1981–82	South Alabama	12–16	2–8	6th	
1982–83	South Alabama	16–12	6–8	5th	
1983–84	South Alabama	22–8	9–5	2nd	NIT Second Round
South Alabama:		171–84 (.671)	54–36 (.600)		
Clemson Tigers (Atlantic Coast Conference) (1984–1994)
1984–85	Clemson	16–13	5–9	T–6th	NIT First Round
1985–86	Clemson	19–15	3–11	7th	NIT Quarterfinal
1986–87	Clemson	25–6	10–4	2nd	NCAA first round
1987–88	Clemson	14–15	4–10	7th	NIT First Round
1988–89	Clemson	19–11	7–7	6th	NCAA Division I Second Round
1989–90	Clemson	26–9*	10–4	1st	NCAA Division I Sweet 16
1990–91	Clemson	11–17	2–12	7th	
1991–92	Clemson	14–14	4–12	9th	
1992–93	Clemson	17–13	5–11	7th	NIT Second Round
1993–94	Clemson	18–16	6–10	T–7th	NIT Quarterfinals
Clemson:		177–128** (.580)	56–90 (.384)		
Auburn Tigers (Southeastern Conference) (1994–2004)
1994–95	Auburn	16–13	7–9	4th (West)	NIT First Round
1995–96	Auburn	19–13	6–10	T–4th (West)	NIT First Round
1996–97	Auburn	16–15	6–10	T–3rd (West)	
1997–98	Auburn	16–14	7–9	3rd (West)	NIT Second Round
1998–99	Auburn	29–4	14–2	1st	NCAA Division I Sweet 16
1999–00	Auburn	24–10	9–7	2nd (West)	NCAA Division I Second Round
2000–01	Auburn	18–14	7–9	T–4th (West)	NIT Second Round
2001–02	Auburn	12–16	4–12	6th (West)	
2002–03	Auburn	22–12	8–8	T–2nd (West)	NCAA Division I Sweet 16
2003–04	Auburn	14–14	5–11	T–4th (West)	
Auburn:		186–125 (.598)	73–87 (.456)		
Coastal Carolina Chanticleers (Big South Conference) (2007–2016)
2007–08	Coastal Carolina	13–15	6–8	T–5th	
2008–09	Coastal Carolina	11–20	5–13	7th	
2009–10	Coastal Carolina	28–7	15–3	1st	NIT First Round
2010–11	Coastal Carolina	28–6	16–2	1st	NIT First Round
2011–12	Coastal Carolina	19–12	12–6	2nd	CIT First Round
2012–13	Coastal Carolina	14–15	9–7	4th	
2013–14	Coastal Carolina	21–13	11–5	1st	NCAA Division I Second Round
2014–15	Coastal Carolina	24–10	12–6	T–3rd	NCAA Division I First Round
2015–16	Coastal Carolina	21–12	12–6	T–2nd	CIT Semifinal
Coastal Carolina Chanticleers (Sun Belt Conference) (2016–2023)
2016–17	Coastal Carolina	20–19	10–8	T–6th	CBI Runner-up
2017–18	Coastal Carolina	14–18	8–10	8th	
2018–19	Coastal Carolina	17–17	9–9	T–6th	CBI Semifinal
2019–20	Coastal Carolina	16–17	8–12	T–8th	
2020–21	Coastal Carolina	18–8	9–5	2nd (East)	CBI Runner-up
2021–22	Coastal Carolina	19–14	8–8	7th	TBC Runner-up
2022–23	Coastal Carolina	11–20	5–13	12th	
2023–24	Coastal Carolina	3–5	0–0		
Coastal Carolina:		297–227 (.567)	155–121 (.562)		
Total:		909–577 (.612)			
National champion Postseason invitational champion Conference regular season champion Conference regular season and conference tournament champion Division regular season champion Division regular season and conference tournament champion Conference tournament champion

* 2 NCAA Tournament wins and 1 loss were vacated

== See also ==
- List of college men's basketball career coaching wins leaders
