= 2022–23 Southern Miss Golden Eagles basketball team =

American college basketball season

2022–23 Southern Miss Golden Eagles basketball

Sun Belt regular season champions Cancún Challenge Mayan Division champions

NIT, First Round
- Conference: Sun Belt Conference
- Record: 25–8 (14–4 Sun Belt)
- Head coach: Jay Ladner (4th season)
- Assistant coaches: Juan Cardona; Nick Williams; Isaiah Carson
- Home arena: Reed Green Coliseum

2022–23 Sun Belt Conference men's basketball standings
	Conf.				Overall
Team	W		L	PCT	W		L	PCT
Southern Miss	14	–	4	.778	25	–	8	.758
Louisiana †	13	–	5	.722	26	–	8	.765
Marshall	13	–	5	.722	24	–	8	.750
James Madison	12	–	6	.667	22	–	11	.667
Troy	11	–	7	.611	20	–	13	.606
Old Dominion	11	–	7	.611	19	–	12	.613
Georgia Southern	9	–	9	.500	17	–	16	.515
South Alabama	9	–	9	.500	19	–	16	.543
Appalachian State	9	–	9	.500	16	–	16	.500
Louisiana–Monroe	7	–	11	.389	11	–	21	.344
Texas State	6	–	12	.333	16	–	19	.457
Coastal Carolina	5	–	13	.278	11	–	20	.355
Arkansas State	4	–	14	.222	13	–	20	.394
Georgia State	3	–	15	.167	10	–	21	.323
† 2023 Sun Belt Tournament winner

The 2022–23 Southern Miss Golden Eagles basketball team represented the University of Southern Mississippi during the 2022–23 NCAA Division I men's basketball season. The team was led by third-year head coach Jay Ladner, and played their home games at Reed Green Coliseum in Hattiesburg, Mississippi as first-year members of the Sun Belt Conference.

== Previous season ==
The Golden Eagles finished the 2021–22 season 7–26, (1–17 C-USA). They defeated UTSA in the first round of the C-USA tournament before losing to Florida Atlantic in the second round.

On October 28, 2021, Southern Miss announced that this would be the last season for the team in the Conference USA and they would become a member of the Sun Belt Conference on July 1, 2022.

== Offseason ==
=== Departures ===
Name	Number	Pos.	Height	Weight	Year	Hometown	Reason for departure
Walyn Napper	1	G	6'0"	182	Sophomore	Columbia, SC	Transferred to Longwood
Blake Roberts	3	G	6'2"	187	Freshman	Hattiesburg, MS	Walk-on; left the team for personal reasons
Rashad Bolden	4	G	6'0"	168	Freshman	Jackson, MS	Transferred to McNeese State
Tae Hardy	10	G	6'3"	191	Junior	Ellenwood, GA	Transferred to UTEP
Isaih Moore	11	F	6'10"	197	Junior	Columbia, SC	Transferred to Fresno State
Tyler Stevenson	14	F	6'8"	215	Junior	Columbus, MS	Walk-on; transferred to Mississippi State
Mark Jaakson	44	G	6'7"	216	Freshman	Tallinn, Estonia	Signed to play professionally in Estonia with KK Pärnu
Jaron Pierre Jr.	55	G	6'5"	182	Freshman	New Orleans, LA	Transferred to Wichita State

=== Incoming transfers ===
Name	Number	Pos.	Height	Weight	Year	Hometown	Previous School
Austin Crowley	1	G	6'5"	195	Junior	West Point, MS	Ole Miss
Neftali Alvarez	2	G	6'2"	165	RS Junior	Cataño, PR	Mercer
Cobie Montgomery	10	G	6'4"		Junior	Louisville, KY	Triton College
Victor Hart	11	F	6'8"	200	Junior	Miami, FL	FIU
Nico Aguirre	12	G	6'0"	179	GS Senior	Castro, Chile	Southwest Baptist
Donavan Moore	15	G	6'3"	180	Junior	Hillsboro, IL	Green Bay
Gianfranco Grafals	21	G/F	6'5"	185	RS Junior	Fleming Island, FL	Walk-on; Eckerd College
Felipe Haase	22	F	6'9"	253	GS Senior	Osorno, Chile	Mercer
Marcelo Perez	25	F	6'5"	200	GS Senior	Talca, Chile	Barry

=== 2022 recruiting class ===
There were no incoming recruits for the class of 2022.

== Preseason ==
=== Preseason Sun Belt Conference poll ===
The Golden Eaglers were picked to finish in 13th place in the conference's preseason poll. Graduate forward Felipe Haase was named to the preseason All-SBC Second Team.

Coaches poll
Predicted finish	Team (1st place Votes)
1	Louisiana - 190 (10)
2	Texas State - 162 (1)
3	South Alabama - 150 (1)
4	James Madison - 149 (1)
5	Georgia State - 127 (1)
6	Marshall - 122
7	App State - 120
8	Coastal Carolina - 100
9	Old Dominion - 93
10	Troy - 76
11	Georgia Southern - 69
12	Arkansas State - 48
13	Southern Miss - 34
14	ULM - 30

== Roster ==
2022–23 Southern Miss Golden Eagles men's basketball team
Players
Coaches

Pos.	#	Name	Height	Weight	Year	Previous school	Hometown
F	0	Tyler Morman	6 ft 9 in (2.06 m)	221 lb (100 kg)	RS Sr	Wyoming	Mableton, GA
G	1	Austin Crowley	6 ft 5 in (1.96 m)	184 lb (83 kg)	Jr	Ole Miss	West Point, MS
G	2	Neftali Alvarez	6 ft 0 in (1.83 m)	196 lb (89 kg)	RS Jr	Mercer	Cataño, PR
G	3	Mo Arnold	6 ft 1 in (1.85 m)	181 lb (82 kg)	Jr	Jacksonville	Picayune, MS
F	4	Denijay Harris	6 ft 7 in (2.01 m)	196 lb (89 kg)	RS Jr	SW Mississippi CC	Columbus, MS
F	5	DeAndre Pinckney	6 ft 8 in (2.03 m)	223 lb (101 kg)	Sr	Broward College	Carol City, FL
G	10	Cobie Montgomery	6 ft 5 in (1.96 m)	200 lb (91 kg)	Jr	Triton College	Louisville, KY
F	11	Victor Hart	6 ft 8 in (2.03 m)	204 lb (93 kg)	RS Jr	FIU	Miami, FL
G	12	Nico Aguirre	6 ft 0 in (1.83 m)	170 lb (77 kg)	GS	Southwest Baptist	Castro, Chile
G	14	Trey Alfonso (W)	6 ft 1 in (1.85 m)	176 lb (80 kg)	So	Fontainebleau HS	Chalmette, LA
G	15	Donavan Ivory	6 ft 6 in (1.98 m)	195 lb (88 kg)	Jr	Green Bay	Kaukauna, WI
G	20	Jeffery Armstrong	5 ft 11 in (1.8 m)	171 lb (78 kg)	RS So	Massanutten Military Academy	Rainsville, AL
G	21	Gianfranco Grafals (W)	6 ft 2 in (1.88 m)	173 lb (78 kg)	RS Jr	Eckerd College	Fleming Island, FL
F	22	Felipe Haase	6 ft 9 in (2.06 m)	245 lb (111 kg)	GS	Mercer	Osorno, Chile
G	25	Marcelo Perez	6 ft 5 in (1.96 m)	217 lb (98 kg)	GS	Barry	Talca, Chile
G	55	Tate Ryder (W)	6 ft 0 in (1.83 m)	167 lb (76 kg)	Jr	East Central CC	Oak Grove, MS

Head coach

- Jay Ladner (Southern Miss)

Assistant coach(es)

- Juan Cardona (Middle Georgia State)
- Nick Williams (Mississippi)
- Isaiah Carson (Valley Forge)

Legend

- (C) Team captain
- (S) Suspended
- (I) Ineligible
- (W) Walk-on
- Injured
- Current redshirt

Roster

== Schedule and results ==
Date time, TV	Rank^{#}	Opponent^{#}	Result	Record	High points	High rebounds	High assists	Site (attendance) city, state
Exhibition
November 1, 2022*; 7:00 p.m.		Delta State	W 84–54		12 – Arnold	9 – Pinckney	5 – Tied	Reed Green Coliseum; Hattiesburg, MS
Non-conference regular season
November 7, 2022*; 7:00 p.m., ESPN+		William Carey	W 75–42	1–0	15 – Crowley	9 – hart	5 – Arnold	Reed Green Coliseum (2,523); Hattiesburg, MS
November 11, 2022*; 6:00 p.m., SECN+		at Vanderbilt	W 60–48	2–0	14 – Haase	11 – Pickney	4 – Tied	Memorial Gymnasium (6,175); Nashville, TN
November 14, 2022*; 7:00 p.m., ESPN+		Loyola (New Orleans)	W 86–62	3–0	17 – Haase	9 – Harris	4 – Arnold	Reed Green Coliseum (2,350); Hattiesburg, MS
November 18, 2022*; 6:00 p.m., ESPN+		at Liberty; Cancún Challenge campus site game	W 76–72	4–0	25 – Crowley	8 – Haase	4 – Crowley	Liberty Arena (3,576); Lynchburg, VA
November 22, 2022*; 2:00 p.m., FloSports		vs. Winthrop; Cancún Challenge Mayan Division semifinals	W 77–52	5–0	22 – Crowley	8 – Pinckney	2 – Tied	Hard Rock Hotel Riviera Maya (107); Cancún, Mexico
November 23, 2022*; 2:00 p.m., FloSports		vs. Purdue Fort Wayne; Cancún Challenge Mayan Division championship	W 70–58	6–0	21 – Haase	5 – Tied	4 – Haase	Hard Rock Hotel Riviera Maya (107); Cancún, Mexico
November 27, 2022*; 2:00 p.m., ESPN+		Mobile	W 103–52	7–0	24 – Crowley	12 – Haase	5 – Arnold	Reed Green Coliseum (2,428); Hattiesburg, MS
November 29, 2022*; 7:00 p.m., ESPN+		Montana	W 64–54	8–0	20 – Ivory	7 – Tied	5 – Arnold	Reed Green Coliseum (3,022); Hattiesburg, MS
December 4, 2022*; 3:00 p.m., 95ESPN+		at Northwestern State	L 82–84	8–1	23 – Haase	12 – Pinckney	5 – Tied	Prather Coliseum (1,430); Natchitoches, LA
December 10, 2022*; 2:00 p.m., ESPN+		Lamar	W 95–59	9–1	24 – Crowley	6 – Pinckney	7 – Crowley	Reed Green Coliseum (2,581); Hattiesburg, MS
December 13, 2022*; 7:00 p.m., ESPN+		at Lamar	W 91–65	10–1	28 – Haase	13 – Haase	6 – Crowley	Montagne Center (1,161); Beaumont, TX
December 18, 2022*; 2:00 p.m., ESPN+		McNeese State	W 86–67	11–1	19 – Haase	9 – Pinckney	8 – Arnold	Reed Green Coliseum (2,600); Hattiesburg, MS
December 22, 2022*; 9:00 p.m., MWN		at UNLV	L 63–74	11–2	23 – Pinckney	13 – Pinckney	6 – Haase	Thomas & Mack Center (6,093); Paradise, NV
Sun Belt Conference regular season
December 29, 2022; 7:00 p.m., ESPN+		Troy	W 64–60	12–2 (1–0)	17 – Crowley	8 – Haase	6 – Arnold	Reed Green Coliseum (3,265); Hattiesburg, MS
December 31, 2022; 2:00 p.m., ESPN+		Appalachian State	W 76–70	13–2 (2–0)	30 – Crowley	6 – Tied	4 – Haase	Reed Green Coliseum (3,192); Hattiesburg, MS
January 5, 2023; 7:00 p.m., ESPN+		at Louisiana	L 61–75	13–3 (2–1)	21 – Pinckney	13 – Pinckney	3 – Crowley	Cajundome (3,007); Lafayette, LA
January 7, 2023; 2:00 p.m., ESPN+		at Louisiana–Monroe	W 65–60	14–3 (3–1)	24 – Pinckney	11 – Pinckney	6 – Haase	Fant–Ewing Coliseum (1,984); Monroe, LA
January 12, 2023; 8:00 p.m., ESPN2		at Marshall	L 67–89	14–4 (3–2)	20 – Crowley	9 – Harris	5 – Arnold	Cam Henderson Center (4,321); Huntington, WV
January 14, 2023; 2:00 p.m., ESPN+		Arkansas State	W 74–57	15–4 (4–2)	22 – Harris	8 – Tied	5 – Pinckney	First National Bank Arena (1,024); Jonesboro, AR
January 19, 2023; 7:00 p.m., ESPN+		South Alabama	W 76–72	16–4 (5–2)	25 – Crowley	9 – Harris	5 – Tied	Reed Green Coliseum (4,128); Hattiesburg, MS
January 21, 2023; 2:00 p.m., ESPN+		James Madison	W 83–70	17–4 (6–2)	28 – Pinckney	5 – Arnold	6 – Arnold	Reed Green Coliseum (4,318); Hattiesburg, MS
January 26, 2023; 7:00 p.m., ESPN+		Arkansas State	W 73–57	18–4 (7–2)	18 – Pinckney	10 – Harris	5 – Haase	Reed Green Coliseum (4,266); Hattiesburg, MS
January 28, 2023; 2:00 p.m., ESPN+		Texas State	W 67–58	19–4 (8–2)	24 – Crowley	7 – Crowley	3 – Tied	Reed Green Coliseum (4,289); Hattiesburg, MS
February 2, 2023; 6:00 p.m., ESPN+		at Troy	W 74–65	20–4 (9–2)	23 – Crowley	7 – Harris	3 – Tied	Trojan Arena (3,314); Troy, AL
February 4, 2023; 1:00 p.m., ESPN+		at Georgia State	W 79–71	21–4 (10–2)	26 – Haase	11 – Pinckney	5 – Arnold	GSU Convocation Center (2,024); Atlanta, GA
February 9, 2023; 7:30 p.m., ESPN+		Louisiana	W 82–71	22–4 (11–2)	22 – Pinckney	6 – Pinckney	4 – Alvarez	Reed Green Coliseum (8,097); Hattiesburg, MS
February 11, 2023; 2:30 p.m., ESPN+		Louisiana–Monroe	W 76–67	23–4 (12–2)	23 – Haase	8 – Crowley	4 – Tied	Reed Green Coliseum (4,587); Hattiesburg, MS
February 16, 2023; 7:00 p.m., ESPN+		at South Alabama	L 54–85	23–5 (12–3)	10 – Tied	4 – Hart	4 – Alvarez	Mitchell Center (2,398); Mobile, AL
February 18, 2023; 12:00 p.m., ESPN+		Georgia Southern	W 73–62	24–5 (13–3)	19 – Alvarez	14 – Harris	7 – Haase	Reed Green Coliseum (4,888); Hattiesburg, MS
February 22, 2023; 6:00 p.m., ESPN+		at Old Dominion	L 64–69	24–6 (13–4)	18 – Haase	13 – Pickney	6 – Alvarez	Chartway Arena (5,428); Norfolk, VA
February 24, 2023; 7:00 p.m., ESPN+		at Texas State	W 79–69	25–6 (14–4)	26 – Haase	10 – Harris	3 – Tied	Strahan Coliseum; San Marcos, TX
Sun Belt tournament
March 4, 2023; 11:30 a.m., ESPN+	(1)	vs. (8) South Alabama; Quarterfinals	L 61–78	25–7	18 – Tied	12 – Harris	3 – Haase	Pensacola Bay Center; Pensacola, FL
NIT
March 14, 2023*; 6:30 pm, ESPN+		at (4) UAB; First round – Clemson bracket	L 60–88	25–8	15 – Pinckney	9 – Harris	7 – Haase	Bartow Arena (2,237); Birmingham, AL
*Non-conference game. ^{#}Rankings from AP Poll. (#) Tournament seedings in parentheses. All times are in Central.

== See also ==
- 2022–23 Southern Miss Lady Eagles basketball team
