= 2022–23 Texas State Bobcats men's basketball team =

American college basketball season

2022–23 Texas State Bobcats men's basketball
- Conference: Sun Belt Conference
- Record: 16–19 (6–12 Sun Belt)
- Head coach: Terrence Johnson (3rd season)
- Associate head coach: Bennie Seltzer
- Assistant coaches: Robert Guster; Donte Mathis
- Home arena: Strahan Arena

2022–23 Sun Belt Conference men's basketball standings
	Conf.				Overall
Team	W		L	PCT	W		L	PCT
Southern Miss	14	–	4	.778	25	–	8	.758
Louisiana †	13	–	5	.722	26	–	8	.765
Marshall	13	–	5	.722	24	–	8	.750
James Madison	12	–	6	.667	22	–	11	.667
Troy	11	–	7	.611	20	–	13	.606
Old Dominion	11	–	7	.611	19	–	12	.613
Georgia Southern	9	–	9	.500	17	–	16	.515
South Alabama	9	–	9	.500	19	–	16	.543
Appalachian State	9	–	9	.500	16	–	16	.500
Louisiana–Monroe	7	–	11	.389	11	–	21	.344
Texas State	6	–	12	.333	16	–	19	.457
Coastal Carolina	5	–	13	.278	11	–	20	.355
Arkansas State	4	–	14	.222	13	–	20	.394
Georgia State	3	–	15	.167	10	–	21	.323
† 2023 Sun Belt Tournament winner

The 2022–23 Texas State Bobcats men's basketball team represented Texas State University in the 2022–23 NCAA Division I men's basketball season. The Bobcats, led by third-year head coach Terrence Johnson, played their home games at Strahan Arena in San Marcos, Texas as members of the Sun Belt Conference.

The Bobcats finished the season 16–19, 6–12 in Sun Belt play, to finish in eleventh place. The Bobcats beat Georgia State in the first round, Old Dominion in the second round and Marshall in the quarterfinals, before losing to Louisiana in the semifinals of the Sun Belt Conference tournament.

== Previous season ==
The Bobcats finished the 2020–21 season 21–8, 12–3 in Sun Belt play, to win the regular-season championship. They lost in the quarterfinals of the Sun Belt tournament to Louisiana. As a regular-season champion who did not win their conference tournament, they received an automatic bid to the National Invitation Tournament where they lost in the first round to North Texas.

== Offseason ==
=== Departures ===
Name	Number	Pos.	Height	Weight	Year	Hometown	Reason for departure
Isiah Small	1	F	6' 8"	170	Senior	Jersey City, NJ	Graduated
Darien Jenkins	3	G	6' 3"	190	RS Junior	Deer Park, NY	Left the team for personal reasons
Shelby Adams	4	G	6' 3"	175	Senior	Converse, TX	Graduated
Caleb Asberry	5	G	6' 3"	170	Senior	Pflugerville, TX	Graduate transferred to Oklahoma State
Deuce Guidry	15	G	5' 8"	155	Sophomore	Dickinson, TX	Walk-on; transferred to Lamar State College–Port Arthur
Nate Lacewell	23	F	6' 9"	210	Sophomore	Missouri City, TX	Transferred to Morehouse College

=== Incoming transfers ===
Name	Number	Pos.	Height	Weight	Year	Hometown	Previous school
Elijah Kennedy	3	G	6' 3"	185	Sophomore	Virginia Beach, VA	Florida
Brandon Davis	10	G	6' 1"	175	Junior	LaPlace, LA	Loyola (New Orleans)
Tuongthach Gatkek	32	F	6' 9"	172	Junior	Portland, ME	Florida

=== Recruiting classes ===
==== 2022 recruiting class ====
College recruiting information
Name	Hometown	School	Height	Weight	Commit date
Jordan Mason; SG	San Antonio, TX	Clark High School	6 ft 2 in (1.88 m)	170 lb (77 kg)	Nov 29, 2021
Jordan Mason; SG	Recruit ratings: 247Sports:				
Davion Sykes; SF	Duncanville, TX	Duncanville High School	6 ft 5 in (1.96 m)	185 lb (84 kg)	Oct 22, 2021
Davion Sykes; SF	Recruit ratings: 247Sports:				
Overall recruit ranking:
Note: In many cases, Scout, Rivals, 247Sports, On3, and ESPN may conflict in their listings of height and weight.; In these cases, the average was taken. ESPN grades are on a 100-point scale.; Sources: "2022 Team Ranking". Rivals.

==== 2023 recruiting class ====
College recruiting information (2023)
Name	Hometown	School	Height	Weight	Commit date
Kaden Gumbs; PG	San Marcos, TX	San Marcos High School	6 ft 1 in (1.85 m)	165 lb (75 kg)	May 11, 2022
Kaden Gumbs; PG	Recruit ratings: 247Sports:				
Overall recruit ranking:
Note: In many cases, Scout, Rivals, 247Sports, On3, and ESPN may conflict in their listings of height and weight.; In these cases, the average was taken. ESPN grades are on a 100-point scale.; Sources: "2023 Team Ranking". Rivals.

== Preseason ==
=== Preseason Sun Belt Conference poll ===
The Bobcats were picked to finish in second place in the conference's preseason poll. Senior guard Mason Harrell was named to the preseason All-SBC First Team.

Coaches poll
Predicted finish	Team (1st-place votes)
1	Louisiana – 190 (10)
2	Texas State – 162 (1)
3	South Alabama – 150 (1)
4	James Madison – 149 (1)
5	Georgia State – 127 (1)
6	Marshall – 122
7	App State – 120
8	Coastal Carolina – 100
9	Old Dominion – 93
10	Troy – 76
11	Georgia Southern – 69
12	Arkansas State – 48
13	Southern Miss – 34
14	ULM – 30

== Roster ==
2022–23 Texas State Bobcats men's basketball team
Players
Coaches

Pos.	#	Name	Height	Weight	Year	Previous school	Hometown
G	0	Dylan Dawson	6 ft 3 in (1.91 m)	180 lb (82 kg)	RS So	Atascocita HS	Humble, TX
F	1	Tyrel Morgan	6 ft 5 in (1.96 m)	185 lb (84 kg)	Sr	Langston Hughes HS; Northern Oklahoma College	Atlanta, GA
G	2	Davion Coleman	6 ft 2 in (1.88 m)	165 lb (75 kg)	So	Jersey Village HS; Blinn College	Houston, TX
G	3	Elijah Kennedy	6 ft 3 in (1.91 m)	200 lb (91 kg)	So	Green Run HS; Florida	Virginia Beach, VA
F	4	Davion Sykes	6 ft 6 in (1.98 m)	200 lb (91 kg)	Fr	Duncanville HS	Duncanville, TX
G	5	Jordan Mason	6 ft 2 in (1.88 m)	175 lb (79 kg)	Fr	Clark HS	San Antonio, TX
G	10	Brandon Davis	6 ft 1 in (1.85 m)	185 lb (84 kg)	Jr	East St. John HS; Loyola (New Orleans)	LaPlace, LA
F	11	Nate Martin	6 ft 8 in (2.03 m)	215 lb (98 kg)	Jr	Cypress Creek HS	Cypress, TX
G	12	Mason Harrell	5 ft 9 in (1.75 m)	145 lb (66 kg)	RS Sr	Carl Albert HS	Midwest City, OK
G	14	Dalen Whitlock (W)	6 ft 4 in (1.93 m)	175 lb (79 kg)	So	Clark HS	San Antonio, TX
F	22	Nighael Ceaser	6 ft 8 in (2.03 m)	225 lb (102 kg)	RS Sr	Ridge Point HS; Collin College	Houston, TX
F	24	Brandon Love	6 ft 9 in (2.06 m)	208 lb (94 kg)	So	George Bush HS	Houston, TX
F	32	Tuongthach Gatkek	6 ft 9 in (2.06 m)	175 lb (79 kg)	Jr	Caprock HS; Florida	Portland, ME
G	55	Drue Drinnon	6 ft 1 in (1.85 m)	180 lb (82 kg)	Sr	NSU University School; Navarro College	Smyrna, GA

Head coach

- Terrence Johnson (Southern)

Assistant coach(es)

- Bennie Seltzer (Washington State)
- Robert Guster (Missouri–Rolla)
- Donte Mathis (Texas State)

Legend

- (C) Team captain
- (S) Suspended
- (I) Ineligible
- (W) Walk-on
- Injured
- Current redshirt

Roster
Last update: September 23, 2025

== Schedule and results ==
Date time, TV	Rank^{#}	Opponent^{#}	Result	Record	High points	High rebounds	High assists	Site (attendance) city, state
Exhibition
November 2, 2022*; 7:00 p.m.		Cameron	W 90–65	–	23 – Davis	7 – 2 tied	6 – Morgan	Strahan Coliseum (780); San Marcos, TX
Non-conference regular season
November 7, 2022*; 6:30 p.m., P12N		at Washington State	L 61–83	0–1	17 – Harrell	5 – 2 tied	4 – Dawson	Beasley Coliseum (2,443); Pullman, WA
November 10, 2022*; 6:00 p.m., ESPN+		Mid-America Christian	W 71–52	1–1	15 – Davis	6 – Love	3 – Martin	Strahan Coliseum (1,131); San Marcos, TX
November 12, 2022*; 3:00 p.m., ESPN+		at Rhode Island	W 70–66	2–1	26 – Harrell	8 – Morgan	4 – Drinnon	Ryan Center (4,610); Kingston, RI
November 17, 2022*; 7:00 p.m., CUSA.tv		at UTSA; I-35 Rivalry	L 56–61	2–2	20 – 2 tied	8 – Martin	5 – Drinnon	Convocation Center (1,587); San Antonio, TX
November 21, 2022*; 9:00 p.m., P12N		at California	W 59–55	3–2	21 – Harrell	9 – Morgan	2 – 3 tied	Haas Pavilion (1,211); Berkeley, CA
November 25, 2022*; 5:00 p.m., ESPN+		vs. Southern Utah; North Shore Classic semifinals	W 78–65	4–2	18 – Harrell	7 – Morgan	4 – Drinnon	Cannon Activities Center (828); Laie, HI
November 26, 2022*; 11:59 p.m., ESPN+		vs. Hawaii; North Shore Classic	L 65–72	4–3	23 – Harrell	7 – 2 tied	3 – Harrell	Cannon Activities Center (3,428); Laie, HI
December 1, 2022*; 7:30 p.m., ESPN+		at Lamar	W 65–55	5–3	18 – Harrell	8 – Sykes	7 – Harrell	Montagne Center (2,269); Beaumont, TX
December 4, 2022*; 2:00 p.m., ESPN+		Rice	L 71–83	5–4	23 – Harrell	7 – Sykes	3 – Drinnon	Strahan Coliseum (1,282); San Marcos, TX
December 10, 2022*; 6:30 p.m., UTAMavs.com		vs. UT Arlington; Simmons Bank Showdown	W 71–65	6–4	23 – Ceaser	11 – Ceaser	3 – 3 tied	Dickies Arena; Fort Worth, TX
December 13, 2022*; 7:00 p.m., ESPN+		Mary Hardin–Baylor	L 65–71	6–5	20 – Harrell	7 – Ceaser	4 – Harrell	Strahan Coliseum (1,189); San Marcos, TX
December 17, 2022*; 2:00 p.m., ESPN+		Sam Houston State	L 62–69	6–6	19 – Ceaser	13 – Ceaser	3 – Drinnon	Strahan Coliseum (1,329); San Marcos, TX
December 21, 2022*; 2:00 p.m., ESPN+		Science and Arts	W 87–72	7–6	27 – Harrell	10 – Ceaser	6 – Harrell	Strahan Coliseum (877); San Marcos, TX
Sun Belt Conference regular season
December 29, 2022; 7:00 p.m., ESPN+		Louisiana–Monroe	L 53–57	7–7 (0–1)	14 – Harrell	12 – Ceaser	1 – 3 tied	Strahan Coliseum (1,052); San Marcos, TX
December 31, 2022; 4:00 p.m., ESPN+		Troy	L 52–55	7–8 (0–2)	16 – Harrell	9 – Morgan	1 – 4 tied	Strahan Coliseum (941); San Marcos, TX
January 5, 2023; 6:00 p.m., ESPN+		at James Madison	W 63–62	8–8 (1–2)	16 – Davis	4 – 6 tied	4 – Drinnon	Atlantic Union Bank Center (3,068); Harrisonburg, VA
January 7, 2023; 2:00 p.m., ESPN+		at South Alabama	W 64–58	9–8 (2–2)	13 – Martin	10 – Morgan	2 – 2 tied	Mitchell Center (1,812); Mobile, AL
January 12, 2023; 7:00 p.m., ESPN+/ESPN2		at Arkansas State	W 61–58	10–8 (3–2)	15 – Harrell	5 – 3 tied	5 – Drinnon	First National Bank Arena (1,257); Jonesboro, AR
January 14, 2023; 2:00 p.m., ESPN+		at Louisiana–Monroe	L 58–61	10–9 (3–3)	17 – Harrell	7 – Morgan	3 – 3 tied	Fant–Ewing Coliseum (2,007); Monroe, LA
January 19, 2023; 7:00 p.m., ESPN+		Marshall	L 73–81	10–10 (3–4)	17 – Drinnon	8 – Morgan	4 – Mason	Strahan Coliseum (3,183); San Marcos, TX
January 21, 2023; 4:00 p.m., ESPN+		Louisiana	L 51–60	10–11 (3–5)	19 – Mason	7 – Mason	1 – 3 tied	Strahan Coliseum (3,397); San Marcos, TX
January 26, 2023; 7:00 p.m., ESPN+		Georgia Southern	W 70–67	11–11 (4–5)	23 – Ceaser	7 – Martin	6 – Drinnon	Strahan Coliseum (2,331); San Marcos, TX
January 28, 2023; 2:00 p.m., ESPN+		at Southern Miss	L 58–67	11–12 (4–6)	12 – 2 tied	13 – Morgan	3 – 2 tied	Reed Green Coliseum (4,289); Hattiesburg, MS
February 2, 2023; 7:00 p.m., ESPN+		at Louisiana	L 63–82	11–13 (4–7)	12 – Ceaser	9 – Morgan	2 – 3 tied	Cajundome (3,256); Lafayette, LA
February 4, 2023; 6:00 p.m., ESPN+		at Troy	L 64–68	11–14 (4–8)	20 – Harrell	7 – Martin	2 – Mason	Trojan Arena (3,192); Troy, AL
February 9, 2023; 7:00 p.m., ESPN+		Arkansas State	W 66–62	12–14 (5–8)	12 – Morgan	7 – Ceaser	4 – Harrell	Strahan Coliseum (2,638); San Marcos, TX
February 11, 2023; 4:00 p.m., ESPN+		Old Dominion	L 68–70	12–15 (5–9)	17 – Harrell	8 – Martin	5 – Harrell	Strahan Coliseum (2,518); San Marcos, TX
February 16, 2023; 5:30 p.m., ESPN+		at Appalachian State	L 75–82	12–16 (5–10)	17 – Harrell	9 – Morgan	5 – Harrell	Holmes Center (2,205); Boone, NC
February 18, 2023; 1:00 p.m., ESPN+		at Coastal Carolina	W 78–75	13–16 (6–10)	22 – Harrell	5 – Morgan	3 – tied	HTC Center (1,410); Conway, SC
February 22, 2023; 7:00 p.m., ESPN+		South Alabama	L 67–76	13–17 (6–11)	18 – Love	7 – Ceaser	3 – tied	Strahan Arena (1,776); San Marcos, TX
February 24, 2023; 7:00 p.m., ESPN+		Southern Miss	L 69–79	13–18 (6–12)	16 – Harrell	10 – Martin	4 – Harrell	Strahan Coliseum (2,617); San Marcos, TX
Sun Belt tournament
February 28, 2023; 7:30 p.m., ESPN+	(11)	vs. (14) Georgia State; First round	W 81–76	14–18	16 – Drinnon	7 – Morgan	4 – Mason	Pensacola Bay Center (748); Pensacola, FL
March 2, 2023; 5:00 p.m., ESPN+	(11)	vs. (6) Old Dominion; Second Round	W 65–36	15–18	20 – Harrell	11 – Morgan	4 – Drinnon	Pensacola Bay Center (821); Pensacola, FL
March 4, 2023; 5:00 p.m., ESPN+	(11)	vs. (3) Marshall; Quarterfinals	W 71–68	16–18	17 – Harrell	10 – Ceaser	4 – 2 tied	Pensacola Bay Center; Pensacola, FL
March 5, 2023; 7:30 p.m., ESPN+	(11)	vs. (2) Louisiana; Semifinals	L 58–64	16–19	12 – Harrell	10 – Ceaser	2 – Harrell	Pensacola Bay Center (2,050); Pensacola, FL
*Non-conference game. ^{#}Rankings from AP poll. (#) Tournament seedings in parentheses. All times are in Central.
