= 2022–23 Troy Trojans men's basketball team =

American college basketball season

2022–23 Troy Trojans men's basketball

Zootown Classic champion
- Conference: Sun Belt Conference
- Record: 20–13 (11–7 Sun Belt)
- Head coach: Scott Cross (4th season)
- Associate head coach: Kenneth Mangrum
- Assistant coaches: Byron Jones; Mike Worley
- Home arena: Trojan Arena (Capacity 6,000)

2022–23 Sun Belt Conference men's basketball standings
	Conf.				Overall
Team	W		L	PCT	W		L	PCT
Southern Miss	14	–	4	.778	25	–	8	.758
Louisiana †	13	–	5	.722	26	–	8	.765
Marshall	13	–	5	.722	24	–	8	.750
James Madison	12	–	6	.667	22	–	11	.667
Troy	11	–	7	.611	20	–	13	.606
Old Dominion	11	–	7	.611	19	–	12	.613
Georgia Southern	9	–	9	.500	17	–	16	.515
South Alabama	9	–	9	.500	19	–	16	.543
Appalachian State	9	–	9	.500	16	–	16	.500
Louisiana–Monroe	7	–	11	.389	11	–	21	.344
Texas State	6	–	12	.333	16	–	19	.457
Coastal Carolina	5	–	13	.278	11	–	20	.355
Arkansas State	4	–	14	.222	13	–	20	.394
Georgia State	3	–	15	.167	10	–	21	.323
† 2023 Sun Belt Tournament winner

The 2022–23 Troy Trojans men's basketball team represented Troy University in the 2022–23 NCAA Division I men's basketball season. The Trojans, led by fourth-year head coach Scott Cross, played their home games at Trojan Arena in Troy, Alabama as members of the Sun Belt Conference.

== Previous season ==
The Trojans finished the 2021–22 season 20–12, 10–6 in SBC play to finish in fourth place. They defeated South Alabama in the quarterfinals of the SBC Tournament before losing to Louisiana in the semifinals. They were invited to the College Basketball Invitational where they lost to Abilene Christian in the first round.

== Offseason ==
=== Departures ===
Name	Number	Pos.	Height	Weight	Year	Hometown	Reason for departure
TK Smith	1	G	6'5"	185	Junior	Memphis, TN	Graduate transferred
Desmond Williams	11	G	6'1"	165	Sophomore	Montgomery, AL	Transferred to UT Martin
Khalyl Waters	13	F	6'5"	190	Senior	Douglasville, GA	Graduated
Jakevan Leftridge	14	G	6'7"	180	Sophomore	Dallas, TX	Transferred
Nick O'Brien	20	G	6'0"	180	Freshman	Troy, AL	Walk-on; left the team for personal reasons
Duke Deen	21	G	5'8"	160	Freshman	Shreveport, LA	Transferred to Panola College
Rifen Miguel	22	F	6'8"	240	Junior	Luanda, Angola	Transferred to UT Martin
Efe Odigie	23	F	6'9"	240	Junior	Houston, TX	Graduate transferred to SMU
Nick Stampley	24	F	6'6"	210	Senior	Broward County, FL	Graduated

=== Incoming transfers ===
Name	Number	Pos.	Height	Weight	Year	Hometown	Previous School
Darius McNeill	1	G	6'3"	185	GS Senior	Houston, TX	UTSA
Aamer Muhammad	2	G	6'1"	190	Junior	Rio Ranch, NM	Lubbock Christian
Nelson Phillips	11	G	6'4"	190	RS Senior	Waner Robins, GA	Georgia State

=== Recruiting classes ===
==== 2022 recruiting class ====
College recruiting information
Name	Hometown	School	Height	Weight	Commit date
Randi Ovalle; SF	Charlotte, NC	Victory Christian Center School	6 ft 7 in (2.01 m)	210 lb (95 kg)	Oct 16, 2021
Randi Ovalle; SF	Recruit ratings: 247Sports:				
Andre Young; PG	Mableton, GA	Pebblebrook High School	5 ft 11 in (1.80 m)	160 lb (73 kg)	Jun 20, 2022
Andre Young; PG	Recruit ratings: No ratings found				
Jackson Fields; SF	Houston, TX	Elkins High School	6 ft 6 in (1.98 m)	N/A	Apr 21, 2022
Jackson Fields; SF	Recruit ratings: No ratings found				
Overall recruit ranking:
Note: In many cases, Scout, Rivals, 247Sports, On3, and ESPN may conflict in their listings of height and weight.; In these cases, the average was taken. ESPN grades are on a 100-point scale.; Sources: "2022 Team Ranking". Rivals.

==== 2023 recruiting class ====
College recruiting information (2023)
Name	Hometown	School	Height	Weight	Commit date
Myles Rigsby; CG	Fort Worth, TX	O.D. Wyatt High School	6 ft 5 in (1.96 m)	180 lb (82 kg)	Sep 13, 2022
Myles Rigsby; CG	Recruit ratings: No ratings found				
Overall recruit ranking:
Note: In many cases, Scout, Rivals, 247Sports, On3, and ESPN may conflict in their listings of height and weight.; In these cases, the average was taken. ESPN grades are on a 100-point scale.; Sources: "2023 Team Ranking". Rivals.

== Preseason ==
=== Preseason Sun Belt Conference poll ===
The Trojans were picked to finish in 10th place in the conference's preseason poll. Senior forward Zay Williams was named to the preseason All-SBC Third Team.

Coaches poll
Predicted finish	Team (1st place Votes)
1	Louisiana - 190 (10)
2	Texas State - 162 (1)
3	South Alabama - 150 (1)
4	James Madison - 149 (1)
5	Georgia State - 127 (1)
6	Marshall - 122
7	App State - 120
8	Coastal Carolina - 100
9	Old Dominion - 93
10	Troy - 76
11	Georgia Southern - 69
12	Arkansas State - 48
13	Southern Miss - 34
14	ULM - 30

== Roster ==
2022–23 Troy Trojans men's basketball team
Players
Coaches

Pos.	#	Name	Height	Weight	Year	Previous school	Hometown
G	0	Kieffer Punter	6 ft 5 in (1.96 m)	175 lb (79 kg)	Sr	All Hallows HS; Tyler JC	Bronx, NY
G	1	Darius McNeill	6 ft 3 in (1.91 m)	185 lb (84 kg)	GS	Westfield HS; UTSA	Houston, TX
G	2	Aamer Muhammad	6 ft 1 in (1.85 m)	195 lb (88 kg)	Jr	Cleveland HS; Lubbock Christian	Rio Rancho, NM
G	3	Duke Miles	6 ft 2 in (1.88 m)	175 lb (79 kg)	So	Robert E. Lee HS	Montgomery, AL
G	4	Andre Young	5 ft 11 in (1.8 m)	160 lb (73 kg)	Fr	Pebblebrook HS	Mableton, GA
G	5	Christyon Eugene	6 ft 3 in (1.91 m)	210 lb (95 kg)	Jr	Spring HS; East Florida State	Spring, TX
F	10	Zay Williams	6 ft 9 in (2.06 m)	190 lb (86 kg)	Sr	Parker HS	Birmingham, AL
G	11	Nelson Phillips	6 ft 3 in (1.91 m)	190 lb (86 kg)	RS Sr	Warner Robins HS; Georgia State	Warner Robins, GA
G	12	Kirk Cole (W)	6 ft 2 in (1.88 m)	160 lb (73 kg)	So	Southwest Covenant	Yukon, OK
F	13	Randi Ovalle	6 ft 7 in (2.01 m)	210 lb (95 kg)	Fr	Success Unlimited Academy	Santiago, DR
F	15	Jackson Fields	6 ft 8 in (2.03 m)	210 lb (95 kg)	Fr	Lawrence E. Elkins HS	Missouri City, TX
F	21	Nate Tshimanga	6 ft 10 in (2.08 m)	230 lb (104 kg)	So	North Central Texas Academy; Our Savior Lutheran Academy	Montreal, QC
F	30	Christian Turner	6 ft 7 in (2.01 m)	220 lb (100 kg)	So	South Grand Prairie HS	Grand Prairie, TX
F	32	Lydell Geffrard	6 ft 8 in (2.03 m)	245 lb (111 kg)	Sr	St. Raymond HS; Three Rivers College	New York, NY
F	33	DJ Jamerson (W)	6 ft 5 in (1.96 m)	190 lb (86 kg)	Fr	Montgomery Catholic	Montgomery, AL
G	34	DJ Roberts	6 ft 1 in (1.85 m)	160 lb (73 kg)	So	Oakman HS	Monroeville, AL
G	35	Remy Graham (W)	6 ft 5 in (1.96 m)	180 lb (82 kg)	Fr	South Walton HS	Santa Rosa Beach, FL
G	55	Kamryn Mitchell (W)	6 ft 4 in (1.93 m)	185 lb (84 kg)	Fr	Houston Academy	Dothan, AL

Head coach

- Scott Cross (UT Arlington)

Assistant coach(es)

- Kenneth Mangrum (North Texas)
- Byron Jones (Eastern Kentucky)
- Mike Worley (Denver)

Legend

- (C) Team captain
- (S) Suspended
- (I) Ineligible
- (W) Walk-on
- Injured
- Current redshirt

Roster

== Schedule and results ==
Date time, TV	Rank^{#}	Opponent^{#}	Result	Record	High points	High rebounds	High assists	Site (attendance) city, state
Non-conference regular season
November 7, 2022*; 6:00 p.m., ESPN+		Montevallo	W 87–67	1–0	17 – Phillips	9 – Tshimanga	4 – Miles	Trojan Arena (2,879); Troy, AL
November 10, 2022*; 6:00 p.m., ESPN+		MUW	W 96–42	2–0	20 – Phillips	9 – Tied	3 – Tied	Trojan Arena (2,498); Troy, AL
November 14, 2022*; 6:00 p.m., ACCNX/ESPN+		at Florida State	W 79–72	3–0	23 – Muhammad	9 – Punter	6 – Tied	Donald L. Tucker Civic Center (4,973); Tallahassee, FL
November 17, 2022*; 6:00 p.m.		vs. Merrimack; Zootown Classic	W 73–54	4–0	14 – Putner	7 – Fields	3 – Tied	Dahlberg Arena; Missoula, MT
November 18, 2022*; 6:00 p.m.		vs. St. Thomas (MN); Zootown Classic	L 76–78	4–1	19 – Miles	7 – Geffrard	4 – Miles	Dahlberg Arena (251); Missoula, MT
November 19, 2022*; 8:30 p.m.		at Montana; Zootown Classic	W 73–62	5–1	14 – Phillips	8 – Williams	5 – Muhammad	Dahlberg Arena (2,644); Missoula, MT
November 22, 2022*; 6:00 p.m., ESPN+		Southern-New Orleans	W 118–61	6–1	22 – Tied	8 – Phillips	8 – Phillips	Trojan Arena (2,130); Troy, AL
November 28, 2022*; 7:00 p.m., SECN		at No. 11 Arkansas	L 61–74	6–2	22 – Phillips	7 – Phillips	3 – Tied	Bud Walton Arena (19,200); Fayetteville, AR
December 3, 2022*; 2:00 p.m., ESPN+		at SIU Edwardsville	L 72–78	6–3	13 – Muhammad	8 – Phillips	4 – Muhammad	Vadalabene Center (727); Edwardsville, IL
December 5, 2022*; 9:00 p.m.		at No. 22 San Diego State	L 55–60	6–4	21 – Muhammad	7 – Punter	3 – Eugene	Viejas Arena (12,038); San Diego, CA
December 10, 2022*; 4:00 p.m., ESPN+		Tennessee Tech	W 87–64	7–4	17 – Eugene	8 – Williams	4 – Tied	Trojan Arena (2,987); Troy, AL
December 17, 2022*; 1:00 p.m., ESPN+		at Southeastern Louisiana	W 77–71	8–4	19 – Punter	8 – Williams	5 – Punter	University Center (403); Hammond, LA
December 21, 2022*; 6:00 p.m., ESPN+		Mercer	L 79–82	8–5	20 – Williams	9 – Williams	4 – Eugene	Trojan Arena (2,081); Troy, AL
Sun Belt Conference regular season
December 29, 2022; 7:00 p.m., ESPN+		at Southern Miss	L 60–64	8–6 (0–1)	19 – Williams	9 – Williams	3 – Tied	Reed Green Coliseum (3,265); Hattiesburg, MS
December 31, 2022; 4:00 p.m., ESPN+		at Texas State	W 55–52	9–6 (1–1)	16 – Punter	5 – Williams	5 – Eugene	Strahan Coliseum (941); San Marcos, TX
January 5, 2023; 6:00 p.m., ESPN+		Old Dominion	W 78–71	10–6 (2–1)	17 – Phillips	7 – Tied	3 – Tied	Trojan Arena (2,322); Troy, AL
January 7, 2023; 4:00 p.m., ESPN+		Arkansas State	W 66–54	11–6 (3–1)	16 – Williams	7 – Phillips	4 – Tied	Trojan Arena (2,972); Troy, AL
January 12, 2023; 6:00 p.m., ESPN+		at Georgia State	W 65–53	12–6 (4–1)	16 – Punter	6 – Phillips	5 – Eugene	GSU Convocation Center (1,673); Atlanta, GA
January 14, 2023; 4:00 p.m., ESPN+		at Appalachian State	L 45–58	12–7 (4–2)	12 – Tied	11 – Phillips	2 – Tied	Holmes Center (2,377); Boone, NC
January 19, 2023; 6:00 p.m., ESPN+		James Madison	L 87–89 ^{OT}	12–8 (4–3)	17 – Muhammad	7 – Tied	5 – McNeill	Trojan Arena (2,953); Troy, AL
January 21, 2023; 4:00 p.m., ESPN+		Louisiana–Monroe	W 77–53	13–8 (5–3)	20 – Muhammad	7 – Williams	4 – Muhammad	Trojan Arena (3,154); Troy, AL
January 26, 2023; 7:00 p.m., ESPN+		at Louisiana	L 57–72	13–9 (5–4)	16 – Punter	9 – Williams	3 – Williams	Cajundome (3,148); Lafayette, LA
January 28, 2023; 3:00 p.m., ESPN+		at South Alabama	L 60–77	13–10 (5–5)	17 – Eugene	4 – Fields	2 – Tied	Mitchell Center (2,779); Mobile, AL
February 2, 2023; 6:00 p.m., ESPN+		Southern Miss	L 65–74	13–11 (5–6)	18 – Williams	9 – Williams	5 – Turner	Trojan Arena (3,314); Troy, AL
February 4, 2023; 6:00 p.m., ESPN+		Texas State	W 68–64	14–11 (6–6)	19 – Williams	7 – Williams	3 – Tied	Trojan Arena (3,192); Troy, AL
February 9, 2023; 7:15 p.m., ESPN+		South Alabama	W 61–57	15–11 (7–6)	16 – Phillips	13 – Williams	3 – Eugene	Trojan Arena (4,014); Troy, AL
February 11, 2023; 4:00 p.m., ESPN+		Louisiana	W 80–65	16–11 (8–6)	26 – Williams	10 – Williams	4 – Tied	Trojan Arena (3,772); Troy, AL
February 16, 2023; 7:30 p.m., ESPN+		at Arkansas State	W 67–62	17–11 (9–6)	22 – Phillips	9 – Williams	3 – Eugene	First National Bank Arena (1,026); Jonesboro, AR
February 18, 2023; 6:00 p.m., ESPN+		at Marshall	L 78–88	17–12 (9–7)	22 – Phillips	8 – Williams	4 – McNeill	Cam Henderson Center (5,711); Huntington, WV
February 22, 2023; 6:30 p.m., ESPN+		Louisiana–Monroe	W 82–78 ^{OT}	18–12 (10–7)	17 – Eugene	12 – Williams	7 – Eugene	Fant–Ewing Coliseum (962); Monroe, LA
February 24, 2023; 6:00 p.m., ESPN+		Coastal Carolina	W 95–74	19–12 (11–7)	19 – Eugene	7 – Williams	5 – Phillips	Trojan Arena (4,232); Troy, AL
Sun Belt tournament
March 2, 2023; 2:00 p.m., ESPN+	(5)	vs. (13) Arkansas State; Second Round	W 63–59	20–12	15 – Williams	14 – Phillips	3 – Eugene	Pensacola Bay Center; Pensacola, FL
March 4, 2023; 2:00 p.m., ESPN+	(5)	vs. (4) James Madison; Quarterfinals	L 72–75	20–13	26 – Eugene	9 – Phillips	3 – McNeill	Pensacola Bay Center; Pensacola, FL
*Non-conference game. ^{#}Rankings from AP Poll. (#) Tournament seedings in parentheses. All times are in Central.
