= 2021–22 Coastal Carolina Chanticleers men's basketball team =

American college basketball season

2021–22 Coastal Carolina Chanticleers men's basketball

The Basketball Classic, Runner–up
- Conference: Sun Belt Conference
- East Division
- Record: 19–14 (8–8 Sun Belt)
- Head coach: Cliff Ellis (15th season)
- Associate head coach: Benny Moss
- Assistant coaches: Zach Settembre; Elwyn McRoy
- Home arena: HTC Center

2021–22 Sun Belt Conference men's basketball standings
	Conf.				Overall
Team	W		L	PCT	W		L	PCT
Texas State	12	–	3	.800	21	–	8	.724
Appalachian State	12	–	6	.667	19	–	15	.559
Georgia State †	9	–	5	.643	18	–	11	.621
Troy	10	–	6	.625	20	–	12	.625
South Alabama	9	–	7	.563	21	–	12	.636
Arkansas State	8	–	7	.533	18	–	11	.621
Coastal Carolina	8	–	8	.500	19	–	14	.576
Louisiana	8	–	9	.471	16	–	15	.516
UT Arlington	7	–	10	.412	11	–	18	.379
Georgia Southern	5	–	11	.313	13	–	16	.448
Louisiana–Monroe	5	–	13	.278	13	–	18	.419
Little Rock	3	–	11	.214	9	–	19	.321
† 2022 Sun Belt Tournament winner

The 2021–22 Coastal Carolina Chanticleers men's basketball team represented Coastal Carolina University in the 2021–22 NCAA Division I men's basketball season. The Chanticleers, led by 15th-year head coach Cliff Ellis, played their home games at the HTC Center in Conway, South Carolina as members of the Sun Belt Conference. They finished the season 19-14, 8-8 in Sun Belt Play to finish in 7th place. They lost in the first round of the Sun Belt tournament to Georgia Southern. They received an invitation to the new The Basketball Classic, where they defeated Maryland Eastern Shore, Florida Gulf Coast, and South Alabama to advance to the championship game where they lost to Fresno State.

== Previous season ==
In a season limited due to the ongoing COVID-19 pandemic, the Chanticleers finished the 2020–21 season 18–8, 9–5 in Sun Belt play to finish in second place in the East Division (division play was instituted due to COVID-19 concerns). They defeated Troy in the quarterfinals of the Sun Belt tournament before losing to Appalachian State in the semifinals. They received a bid to the College Basketball Invitational where they defeated Bryant and Stetson to advance to the CBI championship game. There they lost to Pepperdine.

== Offseason ==
=== Coaching changes ===
Assistant coach Patrice Days left the team to join East Tennessee State's coaching staff. The school hired Tallahassee Community College head coach, Zach Settembre, to replace Days.

=== Departures ===
Name	Number	Pos.	Height	Weight	Year	Hometown	Notes
DeAnthony Tipler	0	G	5'10"	175	Junior	Ashland, Mississippi	Transfer to East Tennessee State
Tyrik Dixon	1	G	6'1"	185	Senior	Bentonville, Arkansas	Graduated
Devante' Jones	3	G	6'1"	200	Junior	New Orleans, Louisiana	Transfer to Michigan
Daivon Stephens	5	F	6'7"	210	Junior	Pittsburgh, Pennsylvania	Transfer to Jacksonville
Tim Ceaser	11	F	6'9"	200	Sophomore	Marion, Arkansas	Transfer to Utah Valley
Mason Grigg	13	G	6'1"	180	Freshman	Rock Hill, South Carolina	Entered Transfer Portal
Malik Legania	14	G	6'5"	180	Junior	New Orleans, Louisiana	Transfer to UT Permian Basin
Hosana Kitenge	32	F	6'7"	270	Sophomore	Crawley, West Sussex, England	Transfer to Howard College

=== Transfers ===
Name	Number	Pos.	Height	Weight	Year	Hometown	Old School
Rudi Williams	3	G	6'2"	190	Senior	Hamilton, Ontario, Canada	Kansas State
Jourdan Smith	11	F	6'7"	195	Junior	New Orleans, Louisiana	Northwest Florida State
Wilfried Likayi	12	F	6'9"	205	Senior	Portland, Oregon	New Mexico State
Vince Cole	24	G	6'6"	190	Senior	Charleston, South Carolina	St. John's

=== Recruiting ===
College recruiting information
Name	Hometown	School	Height	Weight	Commit date
Josh Uduje; Guard	London, England	Arizona Compass Preparatory	6 ft 5 in (1.96 m)	175 lb (79 kg)	Jul 15, 2021
Josh Uduje; Guard	Recruit ratings: No ratings found				
Overall recruit ranking:
Note: In many cases, Scout, Rivals, 247Sports, On3, and ESPN may conflict in their listings of height and weight.; In these cases, the average was taken. ESPN grades are on a 100-point scale.; Sources: "Coastal Carolina 2021–22 Basketball Commits". ESPN.; "2021–22 Team Ranking". Rivals.

== Roster ==
2021–22 Coastal Carolina Chanticleers men's basketball team
Players
Coaches

Pos.	#	Name	Height	Weight	Year	Previous school	Hometown
G	2	Garrick Green	6 ft 6 in (1.98 m)	215 lb (98 kg)	Sr	Scotlandville Magnet HS; Howard College	Baton Rouge, Louisiana
G	3	Rudi Williams	6 ft 2 in (1.88 m)	190 lb (86 kg)	Sr	Forest Trail; Northeastern Oklahoma A&M; Kansas State	Hamilton, Ontario
G	4	Kevin Williamson	6 ft 5 in (1.96 m)	200 lb (91 kg)	Sr	Aiken HS; USC Salkehatchie	Aiken, South Carolina
C	5	Deshawn Thomas	6 ft 10 in (2.08 m)	250 lb (113 kg)	Sr	A. C. Flora HS; Florida Southwestern State; LSU	Columbia, South Carolina
G	10	Ebrima Dibba	6 ft 6 in (1.98 m)	205 lb (93 kg)	RS Jr	St. Benedict's Preparatory	Bredäng, Skarholmen
F	11	Jourdan Smith	6 ft 11 in (2.11 m)	225 lb (102 kg)	Jr	Sunrise Christian; Northwest Florida State	Montgomery, Alabama
F	12	Wilfried Likayi	6 ft 9 in (2.06 m)	205 lb (93 kg)	Sr	Parkrose HS; Casper College; New Mexico State	Portland, Oregon
G	14	Josh Uduje	6 ft 5 in (1.96 m)	175 lb (79 kg)	Fr	Arizona Compass Preparatory	London, England
F	15	Isaac Hippolyte	6 ft 7 in (2.01 m)	215 lb (98 kg)	Sr	St. Joseph Regional HS	Spring Valley, New York
F	20	Ahmard Harvey	6 ft 7 in (2.01 m)	195 lb (88 kg)	Jr	Aspire Basketball	Freeport, Bahamas
G	21	Jalen Milner	6 ft 1 in (1.85 m)	190 lb (86 kg)	Jr	Georgia Military	Milledgeville, Georgia
G	24	Vince Cole	6 ft 6 in (1.98 m)	190 lb (86 kg)	Sr	York Preparatory; USC Salkehatchie; St. John's	Charleston, South Carolina
C	44	Essam Mostafa	6 ft 9 in (2.06 m)	250 lb (113 kg)	RS So	Long Island Lutheran HS	Cairo, Egypt

Head coach

- Cliff Ellis (Middle Tennessee)

Assistant coach(es)

- Benny Moss (UNC Charlotte)
- Elwyn McRoy (Cleveland State)
- Zach Settembre (LSU–Shreveport)

Legend

- (C) Team captain
- (S) Suspended
- (I) Ineligible
- (W) Walk-on
- Injured
- Current redshirt

Roster
Last update: 14 November 2021

== Schedule and results ==
Coastal Carolina's scheduled game against South Alabama on January 8, 2022 was canceled due to COVID-19 protocols within South Alabama's program. The Chanticleers game against UT Arlington scheduled for February 3 was canceled due to freezing rain, ice, and snow in the Arlington area.

Date time, TV	Rank^{#}	Opponent^{#}	Result	Record	High points	High rebounds	High assists	Site (attendance) city, state
Regular season
November 9, 2021*; 7:30 p.m., ESPN+		Ferrum	W 101–73	1–0	24 – Mostafa	14 – Mostafa	9 – Dibba	HTC Center (1,183); Conway, SC
November 18, 2021*; 7:00 p.m.		at UNC Wilmington	L 53–65	1–1	12 – Cole	11 – Mostafa	4 – Williams	Trask Coliseum (4,101); Wilmington, NC
November 23, 2021*; 5:30 p.m., FloHoops		vs. Valparaiso; Nassau Championship semifinal	W 64–61	2–1	16 – Mostafa	11 – Green	7 – Dibba	Baha Mar Convention Center (500); Nassau, Bahamas
November 24, 2021*; 8:00 p.m., FloHoops		vs. Toledo; Nassau Championship	L 70–79	2–2	23 – Mostafa	9 – Mostafa	6 – Dibba	Baha Mar Convention Center (500); Nassau, Bahamas
December 1, 2021*; 7:00 p.m., ESPN+		South Carolina	W 80–56	3–2	23 – Mostafa	13 – Mostafa	6 – Williams	HTC Center (2,924); Conway, SC
December 4, 2021*; 1:00 p.m., ESPN+		Winthrop	W 74–64	4–2	30 – Williams	10 – Williams	5 – Dibba	HTC Center (946); Conway, SC
December 6, 2021*; 7:00 p.m., ESPN+		Mercer	L 69–74	4–3	17 – Cole	7 – Mostafa	10 – Dibba	HTC Center (953); Conway, SC
December 12, 2021*; 2:00 p.m., ESPN+		Wofford	W 60–59	5–3	24 – Mostafa	13 – Mostafa	6 – Dibba	HTC Center (970); Conway, SC
December 15, 2021*; 7:00 p.m., ESPN+		Methodist	W 102–42	6–3	16 – Mostafa	7 – Smith	7 – Williams	HTC Center (774); Conway, SC
December 16, 2021*; 4:00 p.m.		Regent	W 110–53	7–3	18 – Mostafa	10 – Mostafa	9 – 2 Tied	HTC Center (250); Conway, SC
December 19, 2021*; 3:00 p.m.		at Middle Tennessee	L 80–84	7–4	26 – Williams	10 – Mostafa	6 – Dibba	Murphy Center (2,606); Murfreesboro, TN
December 30, 2021; 7:00 p.m., ESPN+		Louisiana–Monroe	W 94–64	8–4 (1–0)	19 – Cole	17 – Mostafa	12 – Dibba	HTC Center (887); Conway, SC
January 1, 2022; 2:00 p.m., ESPN+		Louisiana	L 64–65	8–5 (1–1)	15 – Uduje	8 – Uduje	4 – Dibba	HTC Center (778); Conway, SC
January 2, 2022*; 2:00 p.m.		Emory and Henry	W 76–62	9–5	20 – Mostafa	13 – Mostafa	6 – Dibba	HTC Center (770); Conway, SC
January 6, 2022; 7:00 p.m., ESPN+		at Troy	L 59–69	9–6 (1–2)	21 – Cole	7 – Cole	7 – Dibba	Trojan Arena (1,833); Troy, AL
January 8, 2022; 5:00 p.m., ESPN+		at South Alabama	Canceled due to COVID-19 protocols					Mitchell Center; Mobile, AL
January 13, 2022; 6:30 p.m., ESPN3		at Appalachian State	L 60–61	9–7 (1–3)	25 – Cole	14 – Mostafa	5 – Dibba	Holmes Center (3,008); Boone, NC
January 15, 2022; 2:00 p.m., ESPN+		Appalachian State	L 76–84 ^{OT}	9–8 (1–4)	20 – Cole	10 – Likayi	9 – Dibba	HTC Center (1,267); Conway, SC
January 20, 2022; 7:00 p.m., ESPN+		at Georgia Southern	W 76–72	10–8 (2–4)	19 – Mostafa	8 – Mostafa	5 – Williams	Hanner Fieldhouse (1,861); Statesboro, GA
January 22, 2022; 2:00 p.m., ESPN+		at Georgia State	W 72–68 ^{OT}	11–8 (3–4)	23 – Cole	10 – Likayi	5 – Dibba	GSU Sports Arena (1,034); Atlanta, GA
January 27, 2022; 7:00 p.m., ESPN+		Little Rock	W 65–49	12–8 (4–4)	20 – Williams	16 – Likayi	7 – Dibba	HTC Center (1,122); Conway, SC
January 29, 2022; 1:00 p.m., ESPN+		Arkansas State	L 66–73	12–9 (4–5)	16 – Dibba	13 – Mostafa	4 – Dibba	HTC Center (1,282); Conway, SC
February 3, 2022; 8:00 p.m.		at UT Arlington	Canceled due to inclement weather					College Park Center; Arlington, TX
February 5, 2022; 6:00 p.m., ESPN+		at Texas State	L 64–69	12–10 (4–6)	14 – Cole	12 – Mostafa	6 – Dibba	Strahan Arena (2,638); San Marcos, TX
February 10, 2022; 7:00 p.m., ESPN+		Georgia State	L 50–61	12–11 (4–7)	20 – Cole	7 – Cole	5 – Dibba	HTC Center (1,041); Conway, SC
February 12, 2022; 2:00 p.m., ESPN+		Georgia Southern	W 79–58	13–11 (5–7)	28 – Cole	8 – Mostafa	8 – Williams	HTC Center (969); Conway, SC
February 17, 2022; 7:00 p.m., ESPN+		South Alabama	L 68–71	13–12 (5–8)	24 – Williams	11 – Mostafa	4 – Williams	HTC Center (1,030); Conway, SC
February 19, 2022; 4:00 p.m., ESPN+		Troy	W 73–63	14–12 (6–8)	16 – Cole	9 – Williams	7 – Dibba	HTC Center (1,349); Conway, SC
February 23, 2022; 8:00 p.m., ESPN+		at Arkansas State	W 74–69	15–12 (7–8)	31 – Williams	12 – Likayi	3 – Williams	First National Bank Arena (819); Jonesboro, AR
February 25, 2022; 7:30 p.m., ESPN+		at Little Rock	W 68–55	16–12 (8–8)	21 – Cole	6 – Dibba	7 – Dibba	Jack Stephens Center (2,285); Little Rock, AR
Sun Belt tournament
March 3, 2022; 7:30 pm, ESPN+	(7)	vs. (10) Georgia Southern; First round	L 64–70	16–13	17 – Cole	15 – Mostafa	2 – Tied	Pensacola Bay Center (723); Pensacola, FL
The Basketball Classic
March 16, 2022*; 7:00 pm, ESPN+		Maryland Eastern Shore; First Round - The Zelmo Beaty Game	W 66–42	17–13	18 – Williams	8 – Likayi	4 – Williams	HTC Center (923); Conway, SC
March 21, 2022*; 7:00 pm, ESPN+		Florida Gulf Coast; Quarterfinals	W 84–68	18–13	24 – Williams	14 – Mostafa	9 – Dibba	HTC Center (825); Conway, SC
March 28, 2022*; 8:00 pm, ESPN+		at South Alabama; Semifinals	W 69–68 ^{OT}	19–13	16 – Cole	10 – Dibba	4 – Mostafa	Mitchell Center (1,013); Mobile, AL
April 1, 2022*; 6:00 pm, ESPN+		Fresno State; Championship	L 74–85	19–14	23 – Williams	9 – Likayi	3 – Dibba	HTC Center (1,407); Conway, SC
*Non-conference game. ^{#}Rankings from AP Poll. (#) Tournament seedings in parentheses. All times are in Eastern Time.
