= Elwyn McRoy =

American basketball player-coach

Current position
- Title: Assistant Coach
- Team: Coastal Carolina
- Conference: Sun Belt Conference

Coaching career (HC unless noted)
- 1997: Butler CC (asst.)
- 1998–2000: Independence CC (asst.)
- 2001–2002: Redlands CC (asst.)
- 2002–2003: Frank Phillips
- 2003–2005: Southern (asst.)
- 2005–2006: Northwood (FL) (asst.)
- 2006–2008: Georgia Southern (asst.)
- 2008–2010: Arkansas State (asst.)
- 2010–2011: Iowa State (asst.)
- 2011–2012: Hutchinson CC (asst.)
- 2012–2013: Stillman (asst.)
- 2013–2014: Texas-Pan American (asst.)
- 2013–2014: Coppin State (associate HC)
- 2014–2017: Washington State (asst.)
- 2019–present: Coastal Carolina (asst.)

Accomplishments and honors

Awards
- Top Junior College Recruiter – Basketball Times; Top 25 Mid-Major Assistants – CollegeInsider.com

Elwyn McRoy is an American college basketball coach and current men's basketball assistant coach at Coastal Carolina University.

== Playing career ==
McRoy began his collegiate playing career at Butler Community College and then transferred to Hutchinson Community College, where he helped the Blue Dragons capture the 1994 NJCAA National Championship. After his graduation from Hutchinson, McRoy moved on to Cleveland State to finish his collegiate playing career and earn his bachelor's degree.

== Coaching career ==
A veteran coach at the collegiate level, McRoy has 20 years of experience as an assistant coach and a head coach and has made an impact as both a coach and recruiter. He began his career as an assistant coach at Butler Community College in 1997 before landing at Independence Community College as an assistant from 1998 to 2000, Redlands (Okla.) Community College as an assistant from 2001 to 2002, Frank Phillips (Texas) College as head coach from 2002 to 2003, Southern University as an assistant from 2003 to 2005 and Northwood (Fla.) University as an assistant from 2005 to 2006.

In five seasons at the junior college level, McRoy coached 28 players that went on to play at the NCAA Division I level and was influential in the development of 2004–05 Big 12 Conference Newcomer of the Year Taj Gray (Oklahoma Sooners) and the 2005–06 Horizon Conference Player of the Year Brandon Polk (Butler). Widely known as an exceptional recruiter, McRoy was named a top junior college recruiter by the national publication Basketball Times.

McRoy spent two seasons as an assistant coach and the recruiting coordinator from 2006 to 2008 at Georgia Southern, where he helped lead the Eagles to a 20–12 record this past season and was involved with the recruitment of Mid-Florida Player of the Year Tyrone Crunell, Kansas Junior College Player of the Year and first team All-America selection Julian Allen and Second Team NJCAA All-America pick Antonio Hanson.

In addition to Georgia Southern, McRoy also coached and was the recruiting coordinator at NCAA Division I-A Southern University. While at Southern, the Wichita, Kansas native helped guide the Jaguars to their best record in six years and their first .500 conference finish in eight seasons.

McRoy would spend three more seasons coaching at the Division I level as an assistant at both Arkansas State from 2008 to 2010 and Iowa State 2010-2011 before returning to the junior college ranks at Hutchinson CC in 2011-2012 and Stillman 2012-2013 serving as assistant coach at both institutions.

For the next seven years McRoy would play an integral role in multiple Division I programs, University Texas of Rio Grande as an assistant from 2013 to 2014, Coppin State as associate head coach (2014–17), and Assistant Coach and recruiting coordinator at Washington State University from (2017-2019).

While on the staff of Washington State McRoy was instrumental in the development of Robert Franks who would go on to earn accolades such as Pac-12 Most Improved Player of the Year and First Team All-Conference. McRoy also had developed Charles Elleby who would go on to earn Pac-12 All Freshman-Team honors.

Elwyn McRoy currently serves as Assistant Coach for Coastal Carolina as of September 12, 2019.

A June 3, 2013, article in The Chronicle of Higher Education documented the challenges of his career as a basketball assistant coach at the college level.

In July 2015, McRoy was appointed to the NABC Assistant Coaches committee representing the Mid-Eastern Athletic Conference (MEAC)
