= 2022–23 West Coast Conference men's basketball season =

- League: NCAA Division I
- Sport: Men's basketball
- Number of teams: 10

Regular season

Tournament

Basketball seasons
- ← 2021–22 2023–24 →

2022–23 West Coast Conference men's basketball standings
	Conf.				Overall
Team	W		L	PCT	W		L	PCT
No. 19 Saint Mary's	14	–	2	.875	27	–	8	.771
No. 9 Gonzaga†	14	–	2	.875	31	–	6	.838
Santa Clara	11	–	5	.688	23	–	10	.697
Loyola Marymount	9	–	7	.563	19	–	12	.613
San Francisco	7	–	9	.438	20	–	14	.588
BYU	7	–	9	.438	19	–	15	.559
Pacific	7	–	9	.438	15	–	18	.455
Portland	5	–	11	.313	14	–	19	.424
San Diego	4	–	12	.250	11	–	20	.355
Pepperdine	2	–	14	.125	9	–	22	.290
† 2023 WCC tournament winner Rankings from AP poll

The 2022–23 West Coast Conference men's basketball season began with practices in September 2022 and ended with the 2023 West Coast Conference men's basketball tournament in March 2023. This was the 72nd season for WCC men's basketball, and the 34th under its current name of "West Coast Conference". The conference was founded in 1952 as the California Basketball Association, became the West Coast Athletic Conference in 1956, and dropped the word "Athletic" in 1989.

This was the final WCC season for BYU, which joins the Big 12 Conference on July 1, 2023.

== Head coaches ==
=== Coaching changes ===
Two new head coaches will lead their team in the WCC during the 2022-23 season. On March 6, the University of San Diego announced that they had released Sam Scholl as head coach. Then, on April 6, USD announced that Steve Lavin, who previously had coached at both UCLA and St. John's, had been hired as the new head coach. Due to Todd Golden accepting the position as basketball coach at the University of Florida, San Francisco also had a coaching change. The long time assistant coach Chris Gerlufsen was hired as head coach at USF on March 18.

=== Coaches ===
Team	Head coach	Previous job	Years at school	Overall record	WCC record	WCC Tournament record	NCAA Tournaments	Sweet Sixteens
BYU	Mark Pope	Utah Valley	4	68–26 (.723)	32–12 (.727)	2–3 (.400)	1	0
Gonzaga	Mark Few	Gonzaga (asst.)	24	658–129 (.836)	318–32 (.908)	47–5 (.904)	22	11
Loyola Marymount	Stan Johnson	Marquette (asst.)	3	24–27 (.471)	10–17 (.370)	2–2 (.500)	0	0
Pacific	Leonard Perry	Pacific (asst.)	2	8–22 (.267)	3–11 (.214)	0–1 (.000)	0	0
Pepperdine	Lorenzo Romar	Arizona (asst.)	5	96–115 (.455)	22–40 (.355)	5–4 (.556)	7	3
Portland	Shantay Legans	Eastern Washington	2	19–15 (.559)	7–7 (.500)	1–1 (.500)	1	0
Saint Mary's	Randy Bennett	Saint Louis (asst.)	22	481–201 (.705)	244–93 (.724)	26–18 (.591)	8	1
San Diego	Steve Lavin	St. John's	1	0–0 (–)	0–0 (–)	0–0 (–)	8	4
San Francisco	Chris Gerlufsen	San Francisco (asst.)	1	0–0 (–)	0–0 (–)	0–0 (–)	0	0
Santa Clara	Herb Sendek	Arizona State	7	97–84 (.536)	46–45 (.505)	5–6 (.455)	8	1

Notes:

- Year at school includes 2022–23 season.
- Overall and WCC records are from time at current school and are through the beginning of the 2022–23 season.

== Preseason ==
=== Conference realignment ===
On September 10, 2021, BYU was one of four schools (the others being Cincinnati, Houston, and UCF) that accepted invitations to join the Big 12 Conference beginning with the 2023-24 athletic season. Therefore, BYU will remain a member of the WCC for the current season, with the WCC potentially dropping to 9 teams for the 2023-24 season. West Coast Conference commissioner Gloria Nevarez indicated that the conference is open to adding additional schools to the conference to ensure "continued success" for the league.

=== Preseason poll ===
2022-23 WCC Preseason Men's Basketball Coaches Poll
Rank	Team (First Place Votes)	Points
1.	Gonzaga (9)	81
2.	Saint Mary's (1)	73
T-3.	BYU	57
T-3.	San Francisco	57
5.	Portland	48
6.	Santa Clara	43
7.	Pepperdine	33
8.	San Diego	31
8.	Loyola Marymount	17
10.	Pacific	10

=== All-WCC Preseason Men's Basketball team ===
Honor	Recipient
Preseason All-WCC Team	Rasir Bolton, Gonzaga
Preseason All-WCC Team	Alex Ducas, Saint Mary's
Preseason All-WCC Team	Logan Johnson, Saint Mary's
Preseason All-WCC Team	Keshawn Justice, Santa Clara
Preseason All-WCC Team	Houston Mallette, Pepperdine
Preseason All-WCC Team	Tyler Robertson, Portland
Preseason All-WCC Team	Khalil Shabazz, San Francisco
Preseason All-WCC Team	Julian Strawther, Gonzaga
Preseason All-WCC Team	Drew Timme, Gonzaga
Preseason All-WCC Team	Fousseyni Traore, BYU

== Rankings ==
Legend
	Improvement in ranking
	Drop in ranking
	Not ranked previous week
RV	Received votes but were not ranked in Top 25 of poll
(Italics)	Number of first place votes

		Pre/ Wk 1	Wk 2	Wk 3	Wk 4	Wk 5	Wk 6	Wk 7	Wk 8	Wk 9	Wk 10	Wk 11	Wk 12	Wk 13	Wk 14	Wk 15	Wk 16	Wk 17	Wk 18	Final
BYU	AP	NV	NV	NV	NV	NV	NV	NV	NV	NV	NV	NV	NV	NV	NV	NV	NV	NV		
BYU	C	NV	NV	NV	NV	NV	NV	NV	NV	NV	NV	NV	NV	NV	NV	NV	NV	NV		
Gonzaga	AP	2	2	6	14	18	15	11	10	9	8	6	14	12	16	13	12	10		
Gonzaga	C	2	2	5	12	18	15	12	11	10	8	6	14	14	16	12	12	10		
Loyola Marymount	AP	NV	NV	NV	NV	NV	NV	NV	NV	NV	NV	NV	NV	NV	NV	NV	NV	NV		
Loyola Marymount	C	NV	NV	NV	NV	NV	NV	NV	NV	NV	NV	NV	NV	NV	NV	NV	NV	NV		
Pacific	AP	NV	NV	NV	NV	NV	NV	NV	NV	NV	NV	NV	NV	NV	NV	NV	NV	NV		
Pacific	C	NV	NV	NV	NV	NV	NV	NV	NV	NV	NV	NV	NV	NV	NV	NV	NV	NV		
Pepperdine	AP	NV	NV	NV	NV	NV	NV	NV	NV	NV	NV	NV	NV	NV	NV	NV	NV	NV		
Pepperdine	C	NV	NV	NV	NV	NV	NV	NV	NV	NV	NV	NV	NV	NV	NV	NV	NV	NV		
Portland	AP	NV	NV	NV	NV	NV	NV	NV	NV	NV	NV	NV	NV	NV	NV	NV	NV	NV		
Portland	C	NV	NV	NV	NV	NV	NV	NV	NV	NV	NV	NV	NV	NV	NV	NV	NV	NV		
Saint Mary's	AP	NV	RV	RV	NV	NV	RV	RV	NV	RV	RV	RV	22	18	15	17	15	17		
Saint Mary's	C	RV	RV	RV	RV	NV	RV	RV	RV	RV	RV	24	22	18	14	17	14	16		
San Diego	AP	NV	NV	NV	NV	NV	NV	NV	NV	NV	NV	NV	NV	NV	NV	NV	NV	NV		
San Diego	C	NV	NV	NV	NV	NV	NV	NV	NV	NV	NV	NV	NV	NV	NV	NV	NV	NV		
San Francisco	AP	NV	NV	NV	NV	NV	NV	NV	NV	NV	NV	NV	NV	NV	NV	NV	NV	NV		
San Francisco	C	NV	NV	NV	NV	NV	NV	NV	NV	NV	NV	NV	NV	NV	NV	NV	NV	NV		
Santa Clara	AP	NV	NV	NV	NV	NV	NV	NV	NV	NV	NV	NV	NV	NV	NV	NV	NV	NV		
Santa Clara	C	NV	NV	NV	NV	NV	NV	NV	NV	NV	NV	NV	NV	NV	NV	NV	NV	NV		

== Regular season ==
=== Conference matrix ===
	BYU	Gonzaga	Loyola Marymount	Pacific	Pepperdine	Portland	Saint Mary's	San Diego	San Francisco	Santa Clara
vs. BYU	–	2–0	1–1	0–2	1–1	0–1	2–0	0–1	1–1	2–0
vs. Gonzaga	0–2	–	1–1	0–1	0–2	0–2	1–1	0–1	0–2	0–2
vs. Loyola Marymount	1–1	1–1	–	1–1	0–2	0–2	1–1	1–1	1–0	1–0
vs. Pacific	2–0	1–0	1–1	–	0–2	1–1	1–0	0–2	2–0	1–1
vs. Pepperdine	1–1	2–0	2–0	2–0	–	1–1	1–0	2–0	1–0	2–0
vs. Portland	1–0	2–0	2–0	1–1	1–1	–	2–0	0–2	1–1	1–0
vs. Saint Mary's	0–2	1–1	1–1	0–1	0–1	0–2	–	0–2	0–2	0–2
vs. San Diego	1–0	1–0	1–1	2–0	0–2	2–0	2–0	–	1–1	2–0
vs. San Francisco	1–1	2–0	0–1	0–2	0–1	1–1	2–0	1–1	–	2–0
vs. Santa Clara	0–2	2–0	0–1	1–1	0–2	0–1	2–0	0–2	0–2	–
Total	7–9	14–2	9–7	7–9	2–14	5–11	14–2	4–12	7–9	11–5

=== Early season tournaments ===
The following table summarizes the multiple-team events (MTE) or early season tournaments in which teams from the West Coast Conference will participate.

Team	Tournament	Dates	Result
BYU	Battle 4 Atlantis	November 23–25	7th
Gonzaga	Phil Knight Invitational	November 24–27	3rd
Loyola Marymount	Jamaica Classic	November 18–20	1st
Pacific	Pacific MTE	November 22–28	–
Pepperdine	Diamond Head Classic	December 22–25	
Portland	Phil Knight Invitational	November 24–27	8th
Saint Mary's	Wooden Legacy	November 23–24	2nd
San Diego	Las Vegas Invitational	November 25–26	4th
San Francisco	Hall of Fame Classic	November 21–22	1st
Santa Clara	Bahamas Championship	November 18–20	2nd

=== WCC Player/Freshman of the Week ===
Throughout the year, the West Coast Conference names a player of the week and a freshman of the week as follows:

Week	Date	Player of the Week	Freshman of the Week
1	November 14, 2022	Brandin Podziemski, Santa Clara	Aidan Mahaney, Saint Mary's
2	November 21, 2022	Eric Williams, San Diego	Chance Stephens, LMU
3	November 28, 2022	Tyler Robertson, Portland	Alden Applewhite, Portland
4	December 5, 2022	Brandin Podziemski (2), Santa Clara	Aidan Mahaney (2), Saint Mary's
5	December 12, 2022	Drew Timme, Gonzaga	Aidan Mahaney (3), Saint Mary's
6	December 20, 2022	Drew Timme (2), Gonzaga	Dallin Hall, BYU
7	December 27, 2022	Maxwell Lewis, Pepperdine	Jevon Porter, Pepperdine
8	January 2, 2023	Drew Timme (3), Gonzaga	Aidan Mahaney (4), Saint Mary's
9	January 9, 2023	Keylan Boone, Pacific	Aidan Mahaney (5), Saint Mary's & Moe Odum, Pacific
10	January 16, 2023	Logan Johnson, Saint Mary’s	Aidan Mahaney (6), Saint Mary's
11	January 23, 2023	Cam Shelton, LMU	Aidan Mahaney (7), Saint Mary's
12	January 30, 2023	Julian Strawther, Gonzaga	Aidan Mahaney (8), Saint Mary's
13	February 6, 2023	Mitchell Saxen, Saint Mary's	Aidan Mahaney (9), Saint Mary's
14	February 13, 2023	Cam Shelton (2), LMU	Jevon Porter (2), Pepperdine
15	February 20, 2023	Brandin Podziemski (3), Santa Clara	Aidan Mahaney (10), Saint Mary's
16	February 27, 2023	Brandin Podziemski (4), Santa Clara & Cam Shelton (3), LMU	Jevon Porter (3), Pepperdine

== Postseason ==
=== WCC tournament ===
First round Thursday, March 2
8	Portland	92
9	San Diego	74
7	Pacific	84
10	Pepperdine	71

Second round Friday, March 3
5	BYU	82
8	Portland	71
6	San Francisco	80
7	Pacific	63

Third round Saturday, March 4
4	Loyola Marymount	63
5	BYU	73
3	Santa Clara	87
6	San Francisco	93*

Semifinals; Monday, March 6
1	Saint Mary’s	76
5	BYU	69
2	Gonzaga	84
6	San Francisco	73

Championship; Tuesday, March 7
1	Saint Mary's	51
2	Gonzaga	77

* denotes overtime period

=== NCAA Tournament ===
School	Seed	Region	First round	Second round	Sweet 16	Elite Eight	Final Four	Championship
Gonzaga	3	West	Defeated (14 W) Grand Canyon 82–70	Defeated (6 W) TCU 84–81	Defeated (2 W) UCLA 79–76	Lost to (4 W) UConn 82–54	DNP	
Saint Mary's	5	West	Defeated (12 W) VCU 63–51	Lost to (4 W) UConn 70–55	DNP			

== All-WCC Awards and Teams ==
On March 2, 2022, the West Coast Conference announced the following awards:

Honor	Recipient	School
Player of the Year	Brandin Podziemski	Santa Clara
Player of the Year	Drew Timme	Gonzaga
Coach of the Year	Randy Bennett	Saint Mary’s
Defensive Player of the Year	Logan Johnson	Saint Mary's
Newcomer of the Year	Brandin Podziemski	Santa Clara
Sixth Player of the Year	Malachi Smith	Gonzaga
All-WCC First Team	Logan Johnson	Saint Mary's
All-WCC First Team	Aidan Mahaney	Saint Mary's
All-WCC First Team	Brandin Podziemski	Santa Clara
All-WCC First Team	Tyrell Roberts	San Francisco
All-WCC First Team	Mitchell Saxen	Saint Mary's
All-WCC First Team	Khalil Shabazz	San Francisco
All-WCC First Team	Cam Shelton	LMU
All-WCC First Team	Carlos Stewart	Santa Clara
All-WCC First Team	Julian Strawther	Gonzaga
All-WCC First Team	Drew Timme	Gonzaga
All-WCC Second Team	Marcellus Earlington	San Diego
All-WCC Second Team	Keshawn Justice	Santa Clara
All-WCC Second Team	Maxwell Lewis	Pepperdine
All-WCC Second Team	Fousseyni Traore	BYU
All-WCC Second Team	Moses Wood	Portland
All-WCC Freshman Team	Juan Sebastian Gorosito	Portland
All-WCC Freshman Team	Dallin Hall	BYU
All-WCC Freshman Team	Aidan Mahaney	Saint Mary's
All-WCC Freshman Team	Moe Odum	Pacific
All-WCC Freshman Team	Jevon Porter	Pepperdine
WCC Honorable Mention	Keylan Boone	Pacific
WCC Honorable Mention	Alex Ducas	Saint Mary's
WCC Honorable Mention	Spencer Johnson	BYU
WCC Honorable Mention	Keli Leaupepe	LMU
WCC Honorable Mention	Tyler Robertson	Portland
WCC Honorable Mention	Anton Watson	Gonzaga
