= 2022–23 Portland Pilots men's basketball team =

Sports team season

2022–23 Portland Pilots men's basketball
- Conference: West Coast Conference
- Record: 14–19 (5–11 WCC)
- Head coach: Shantay Legans (2nd season)
- Assistant coaches: Bobby Suarez; T.J. Lipold; Jeremy Pope
- Home arena: Chiles Center

2022–23 West Coast Conference men's basketball standings
	Conf.				Overall
Team	W		L	PCT	W		L	PCT
No. 19 Saint Mary's	14	–	2	.875	27	–	8	.771
No. 9 Gonzaga†	14	–	2	.875	31	–	6	.838
Santa Clara	11	–	5	.688	23	–	10	.697
Loyola Marymount	9	–	7	.563	19	–	12	.613
San Francisco	7	–	9	.438	20	–	14	.588
BYU	7	–	9	.438	19	–	15	.559
Pacific	7	–	9	.438	15	–	18	.455
Portland	5	–	11	.313	14	–	19	.424
San Diego	4	–	12	.250	11	–	20	.355
Pepperdine	2	–	14	.125	9	–	22	.290
† 2023 WCC tournament winner Rankings from AP poll

The 2022–23 Portland Pilots men's basketball team represented the University of Portland during the 2022–23 NCAA Division I men's basketball season. The Pilots, led by second-year head coach Shantay Legans, played their home games at the Chiles Center as members of the West Coast Conference.

== Previous season ==
The Pilots finished the 2021–22 season 19–15, 7–7 in WCC play to finish in sixth place. They defeated San Diego in the second round of the WCC tournament before losing to Santa Clara in the quarterfinals. The Pilots received an invitation to the Basketball Classic, where they defeated New Orleans before losing to Southern Utah in the quarterfinals.

== Offseason ==
=== Departures ===
Name	Number	Pos.	Height	Weight	Year	Hometown	Reason for departure
Yaru Harvey	0	G	6'3"	175	Freshman	Sacramento, CA	Transferred to Northwest Nazarene
Skylar Wilson	3	G	6'7"	185	Freshman	Aurora, CO	Transferred to Nebraska–Kearney
Nikola Milošević	4	G	6'5"	190	Freshman	Podgorica, Montenegro	Transferred
Matija Svetozarevic	13	G/F	6'8"	180	Freshman	Niš, Serbia	Transferred
Miles Turner	21	G	6'2"	190	RS junior	Tracy, CA	Walk-on; didn't return
Liam Faler	22	G	5'10"	180	Freshman	Santa Clara, CA	Walk-on; not on team roster
Matheus Silveria	24	C	7'0"	255	RS sophomore	Três Pontas, Brazil	Transferred to Rollins
Wyatt Watson	34	F	6'9"	195	RS junior	Bellingham, WA	Walk-on; transferred to Western Washington

=== Incoming transfers ===
Name	Number	Pos.	Height	Weight	Year	Hometown	Previous school
Vukasin Masic	1	G	6'5"		Junior	Belgrade, Serbia	Maine
Alden Applewhite	3	F	6'7"	205	Sophomore	Memphis, TN	Mississippi State
Wyatt Lowell	21	F	6'9"		RS junior	Gilbert, AZ	Snow College
Joey St. Pierre	44	C	6'10"	275	GS senior	Spring Grove, IL	Milwaukee

=== 2022 recruiting class ===
College recruiting
Name	Hometown	School	Height	Weight	Commit date
Juanse Gorosito; PG	Ceras, Argentina	Denver Prep Academy	5 ft 10 in (1.78 m)	180 lb (82 kg)	Dec 30, 2021
Juanse Gorosito; PG	Recruit ratings: Scout: Rivals: (0)				
Bol Dengdit; PF	Melbourne, Australia	NBA Global Academy	6 ft 11 in (2.11 m)	200 lb (91 kg)	
Bol Dengdit; PF	Recruit ratings: Scout: Rivals: (0)				
Overall recruit ranking: Scout: nr Rivals: nr ESPN: nr
Note: In many cases, Scout, Rivals, 247Sports, On3, and ESPN may conflict in their listings of height and weight.; In these cases, the average was taken. ESPN grades are on a 100-point scale.; Sources: "Portland Pilots 2022 Basketball Commitments". Rivals.; "2022 Portland Pilots Basketball Commits". Scout.; "ESPN 2022 Portland Pilots Basketball recruits". ESPN.; "Scout.com Team Recruiting Rankings". Scout.; "2022 Team Ranking". Rivals.

== Roster ==
2022–23 Portland Pilots men's basketball team
Players
Coaches

Pos.	#	Name	Height	Weight	Year	Previous school	Hometown
G	0	Vukasin Masic	6 ft 5 in (1.96 m)	205 lb (93 kg)	Jr	Hoosac School; Maine	Belgrade, Serbia
F	1	Moses Wood	6 ft 8 in (2.03 m)	210 lb (95 kg)	RS Sr	Galena HS; Tulane/UNLV	Reno, NV
G/F	2	Tyler Robertson	6 ft 6 in (1.98 m)	200 lb (91 kg)	Sr	Box Hill Sr. Secondary; Eastern Washington	Melbourne, Australia
F	3	Alden Applewhite	6 ft 7 in (2.01 m)	205 lb (93 kg)	So	AZ Compass Prep; Mississippi State	Memphis, TN
G	4	Juan Sebastian Gorosito	6 ft 1 in (1.85 m)	150 lb (68 kg)	Fr	Denver Prep Academy	Ceres, Santa Fe, Argentina
G	5	Chris Austin	6 ft 4 in (1.93 m)	205 lb (93 kg)	RS Jr	Maranatha HS; Fordham	Pasadena, CA
F	10	Coleman Lemke (W)	6 ft 8 in (2.03 m)	190 lb (86 kg)	So	Faith Lutheran HS	Las Vegas, NV
G	11	Jack Perry	6 ft 2 in (1.88 m)	190 lb (86 kg)	RS Sr	Camberwell Grammar School; Eastern Washington	Melbourne, Australia
F	12	Kristian Sjolund	6 ft 8 in (2.03 m)	210 lb (95 kg)	RS Jr	Topkins HS; Georgia Tech/UTEP	Kongsberg, Norway
G/F	15	Chika Nduka (W)	6 ft 6 in (1.98 m)	225 lb (102 kg)	So	Eastside Catholic HS	Seattle, WA
F	21	Wyatt Lowell	6 ft 9 in (2.06 m)	220 lb (100 kg)	So	Williams Field HS; Snow College	Gilbert, AZ
F	23	Vasilije Vučinić	6 ft 11 in (2.11 m)	225 lb (102 kg)	So	BKK Radnički	Bijelo Polje, Montenegro
F	24	Bol Dengdit	6 ft 11 in (2.11 m)	200 lb (91 kg)	Fr	NBA Global Academy	Melbourne, Australia
G	25	Michael Meadows	6 ft 2 in (1.88 m)	175 lb (79 kg)	RS Jr	Campbell Hall School; Eastern Washington	Hollywood, CA
C	44	Joey St. Pierre	6 ft 10 in (2.08 m)	255 lb (116 kg)	RS Sr	Richmond-Burton HS; Milwaukee	Spring Grove, IL

Head coach

- Shantay Legans (Fresno State)

Assistant coach(es)

- Bobby Suarez (Florida Gulf Coast)
- T.J. Lipold (Westmont College)
- Jeremy Pope (Biola)

Legend

- (C) Team captain
- (S) Suspended
- (I) Ineligible
- (W) Walk-on
- Injured
- Current redshirt

Roster

== Schedule and results ==
Date time, TV	Rank^{#}	Opponent^{#}	Result	Record	High points	High rebounds	High assists	Site (attendance) city, state
Non-conference regular season
November 7, 2022*; 7:30 p.m., WCC Network		Lewis & Clark College	W 89–62	1–0	18 – Tied	8 – Sjolund	7 – Robertson	Chiles Center (931); Portland, OR
November 9, 2022*; 7:30 p.m., WCC Network		Florida A&M	W 91–54	2–0	20 – Sjolund	6 – Sjolund	4 – Robertson	Chiles Center (1,107); Portland, OR
November 11, 2022*; 7:00 p.m., KRCW		Portland State	W 98–91	3–0	32 – Robertson	11 – Wood	6 – Robertson	Chiles Center (1,607); Portland, OR
November 14, 2022*; 4:00 p.m., ESPN+		at Kent State	L 65–77	3–1	13 – Wood	8 – Wood	3 – Perry	MAC Center (1,575); Kent, OH
November 17, 2022*; 6:00 p.m., MW Network		at Air Force	W 64–51	4–1	15 – Robertson	7 – Wood	3 – Tied	Clune Arena (1,276); Colorado Springs, CO
November 19, 2022*; 5:00 p.m., WCC Network		Seattle	L 68–80	4–2	22 – Robertson	8 – Robertson	4 – Robertson	Chiles Center (1,119); Portland, OR
November 24, 2022*; 10:00 a.m., ESPN		vs. No. 1 North Carolina; Phil Knight Invitational quarterfinals	L 81–89	4–3	21 – Wood	6 – Nduka	7 – Robertson	Moda Center (6,229); Portland, OR
November 25, 2022*; 12:00 p.m., ESPN2		vs. Villanova; Phil Knight Invitational consolation 2nd round	W 83–71	5–3	16 – Wood	7 – Robertson	8 – Robertson	Veterans Memorial Coliseum; Portland, OR
November 27, 2022*; 2:30 p.m., ESPN		No. 12 Michigan State; Phil Knight Invitational 5th place game	L 77–78	5–4	16 – Tied	7 – Robertson	9 – Robertson	Chiles Center (1,956); Portland, OR
November 30, 2022*; 7:00 p.m., WCC Network		Multnomah	W 100–79	6–4	20 – Lowell	10 – Robertson	12 – Robertson	Chiles Center (936); Portland, OR
December 3, 2022*; 5:00 p.m., KRCW		North Dakota	W 90–69	7–4	18 – Tied	10 – Wood	6 – Wood	Chiles Center (1,128); Portland, OR
December 5, 2022*; 7:00 p.m., WCC Network		North Dakota State	L 62–67	7–5	19 – Sjolund	11 – Robertson	7 – Robertson	Chiles Center (906); Portland, OR
December 10, 2022*; 5:30 p.m., WCC Network		New Orleans	W 100–61	8–5	21 – Wood	9 – Vasilije	15 – Robertson	Chiles Center (1,024); Portland, OR
December 17, 2022*; 5:00 p.m., P12N		at Oregon	L 56–78	8–6	13 – Robertson	7 – Applewhite	7 – Applewhite	Matthew Knight Arena (5,074); Eugene, OR
December 22, 2022*; 2:00 p.m., ESPN+		at UC Riverside	L 65–76	8–7	20 – Applewhite	5 – Tied	2 – Gorosito	SRC Arena (264); Riverside, CA
WCC regular season
December 29, 2022; 6:00 p.m., KRCW		Loyola Marymount	L 72–92	8–8 (0–1)	29 – Meadows	7 – Sjolund	3 – Meadows	Chiles Center (1,820); Portland, OR
December 31, 2022; 6:00 p.m., BYUtv		at BYU	L 58–71	8–9 (0–2)	32 – Sjolund	6 – Sjolund	3 – Meadows	Marriott Center (13,793); Provo, UT
January 7, 2023; 6:00 p.m., WCC Network		at Saint Mary's	L 43–85	8–10 (0–3)	13 – Applewhite	7 – St. Pierre	2 – Sjolund	University Credit Union Pavilion (3,500); Moraga, CA
January 12, 2023; 8:00 p.m., ESPNU		San Francisco	W 92–87	9–10 (1–3)	23 – Robertson	12 – Sjolund	5 – Robertson	Chiles Center (1,388); Portland, OR
January 14, 2023; 7:00 p.m., ESPN2		at No. 8 Gonzaga	L 75–115	9–11 (1–4)	19 – Wood	12 – Sjolund	4 – Robertson	McCarthey Athletic Center (6,000); Spokane, WA
January 19, 2023; 6:00 p.m., KRCW		San Diego	W 88–83	10–11 (2–4)	26 – Wood	7 – Wood	8 – Robertson	Chiles Center (1,200); Portland, OR
January 21, 2023; 3:00 p.m., RTNW		Pepperdine	W 91–76	11–11 (3–4)	17 – Wood	5 – Sjolund	7 – Robertson	Chiles Center (1,364); Portland, OR
January 26, 2023; 7:00 p.m., WCC Network		at Loyola Marymount	L 60–79	11–12 (3–5)	15 – Wood	8 – Wood	3 – Tied	Gersten Pavilion (1,306); Los Angeles, CA
January 28, 2023; 4:00 p.m., RTNW		No. 14 Gonzaga	L 67–82	11–13 (3–6)	19 – Wood	5 – Robertson	8 – Robertson	Chiles Center (4,497); Portland, OR
February 2, 2023; 7:00 p.m., WCC Network		at San Diego	W 80–61	12–13 (4–6)	19 – Robertson	9 – Wood	6 – Tied	Jenny Craig Pavilion (1,210); San Diego, CA
February 4, 2023; 5:00 p.m., WCC Network		at Pepperdine	L 93–94 ^{2OT}	12–14 (4–7)	35 – Robertson	14 – Robertson	5 – Robertson	Firestone Fieldhouse (714); Malibu, CA
February 9, 2023; 6:00 p.m., KRCW		Pacific	W 89–73	13–14 (5–7)	22 – Boone	6 – Denson	10 – Odum	Chiles Center (1,315); Portland, OR
February 11, 2023; 3:00 p.m., CBSSN		No. 15 Saint Mary's	L 64–81	13–15 (5–8)	12 – Sjolund	3 – Tied	3 – Gorosito	Chiles Center (2,454); Portland, OR
February 18, 2023; 5:30 p.m., WCC Network		Santa Clara	L 84–103	13–16 (5–9)	39 – Meadows	8 – Wood	3 – Robertson	Chiles Center (2,621); Portland, OR
February 23, 2023; 8:00 p.m., CBSSN		at San Francisco	L 89–92	13–17 (5–10)	28 – Wood	9 – Wood	4 – Meadows	War Memorial Gymnasium (2,933); San Francisco, CA
February 25, 2023; 4:00 p.m., RTNW		at Pacific	L 77–81	13–18 (5–11)	26 – Wood	9 – Tied	5 – Robertson	Alex G. Spanos Center (2,529); Stockton, CA
WCC tournament
March 2, 2023; 6:00 p.m., WCC Network′	(8)	vs. (9) San Diego; First round	W 92–74	14–18	23 – Robertson	11 – Robertson	6 – Robertson	Orleans Arena; Paradise, NV
March 2, 2023; 6:00 p.m., WCC Network	(8)	vs. (5) BYU; Second round	L 71–82	14–19	31 – Robertson	6 – Wood	6 – Robertson	Orleans Arena; Paradise, NV
*Non-conference game. ^{#}Rankings from AP Poll. (#) Tournament seedings in parentheses. All times are in Pacific Time.

Source: Schedule
