= 2023 West Coast Conference men's basketball tournament =

- Classification: Division I
- Season: 2022–23
- Teams: 10
- Site: Orleans Arena; Paradise, Nevada
- Champions: Gonzaga (21st title)
- Winning coach: Mark Few (19th title)
- MVP: Drew Timme (Gonzaga)
- Television: WCC Network, ESPN, ESPN2

2022–23 West Coast Conference men's basketball standings
	Conf.				Overall
Team	W		L	PCT	W		L	PCT
No. 19 Saint Mary's	14	–	2	.875	27	–	8	.771
No. 9 Gonzaga†	14	–	2	.875	31	–	6	.838
Santa Clara	11	–	5	.688	23	–	10	.697
Loyola Marymount	9	–	7	.563	19	–	12	.613
San Francisco	7	–	9	.438	20	–	14	.588
BYU	7	–	9	.438	19	–	15	.559
Pacific	7	–	9	.438	15	–	18	.455
Portland	5	–	11	.313	14	–	19	.424
San Diego	4	–	12	.250	11	–	20	.355
Pepperdine	2	–	14	.125	9	–	22	.290
† 2023 WCC tournament winner Rankings from AP poll

The 2023 West Coast Conference men's basketball Tournament was the postseason men's basketball tournament for the West Coast Conference for the 2022–23 season. All tournament games were played at Orleans Arena in the Las Vegas-area community of Paradise, Nevada, from March 2–7, 2023.

== Seeds ==
All 10 conference teams participated in the tournament. Teams are seeded by record within the conference, with a tiebreaker system to seed teams with identical conference records. The tiebreakers operate in the following order:

1. Head-to-head record
2. Record against the top-seeded team not involved in the tie, going down through the standings until the tie is broken
3. NET rating after the final regular-season conference games on February 25

Seed	School	Conf. record	Tiebreaker(s)
1	Saint Mary’s	14–2	#7 NET
2	Gonzaga	14–2	#9 NET
3	Santa Clara	11–5	
4	Loyola Marymount	9–7	
5	BYU	7–9	#89 NET
6	San Francisco	7–9	#121 NET
7	Pacific	7–9	0-4 vs. BYU & USF
8	Portland	5–11	
9	San Diego	4–12	
10	Pepperdine	2–14	

== Schedule and results ==
Game	Time	Matchup	Score	Television
First round - Thursday, March 2
1	6:00 pm	No. 8 Portland vs. No. 9 San Diego	92–74	WCC Network, BYUtv, RSN^{α}
2	8:30 pm	No. 7 Pacific vs. No. 10 Pepperdine	84–71	WCC Network, BYUtv, RSN^{α}
Second round - Friday, March 3
3	6:00 pm	No. 5 BYU vs. No. 8 Portland	82–71	WCC Network, BYUtv, RSN^{α}
4	8:30 pm	No. 6 San Francisco vs. No. 7 Pacific	80–63	WCC Network, BYUtv, RSN^{α}
Quarterfinals – Saturday, March 4
5	7:00 pm	No. 4 Loyola Marymount vs. No. 5 BYU	63-73	ESPN2
6	9:30 pm	No. 3 Santa Clara vs. No. 6 San Francisco	87-93^{2OT}	ESPN2
Semifinals - Monday, March 6
7	6:00 pm	No. 1 Saint Mary’s vs. No. 5 BYU	76–69	ESPN
8	8:30 pm	No. 2 Gonzaga vs. No. 6 San Francisco	84-73	ESPN2
Final – Tuesday, March 7
9	6:00 pm	No. 1 Saint Mary’s vs. No. 2 Gonzaga	51-77	ESPN
*Game times in PST. Rankings denote tournament seed. Reference:

=== Notes ===
^α RSNs airing the games include Bally Sports, AT&T SportsNet, Root Sports Northwest, and MSGSN. (RSNs may not carry every game)

== Bracket ==
First round Thursday, March 2
8	Portland	92
9	San Diego	74
7	Pacific	84
10	Pepperdine	71

Second round Friday, March 3
5	BYU	82
8	Portland	71
6	San Francisco	80
7	Pacific	63

Third round Saturday, March 4
4	Loyola Marymount	63
5	BYU	73
3	Santa Clara	87
6	San Francisco	93*

Semifinals; Monday, March 6
1	Saint Mary’s	76
5	BYU	69
2	Gonzaga	84
6	San Francisco	73

Championship; Tuesday, March 7
1	Saint Mary's	51
2	Gonzaga	77

* denotes overtime period

== See also ==
- 2023 West Coast Conference women's basketball tournament
