= 2022–23 Gonzaga Bulldogs men's basketball team =

American collegiate team

2022–23 Gonzaga Bulldogs men's basketball

WCC regular season co-champions WCC tournament champions

NCAA tournament, Elite Eight
- Conference: West Coast Conference

Ranking
- Coaches: No. 10
- AP: No. 9
- Record: 31–6 (14–2 WCC)
- Head coach: Mark Few (24th season)
- Assistant coaches: Brian Michaelson (10th season); Roger Powell Jr. (4th season); Stephen Gentry (2nd season)
- Home arena: McCarthey Athletic Center

2022–23 West Coast Conference men's basketball standings
	Conf.				Overall
Team	W		L	PCT	W		L	PCT
No. 19 Saint Mary's	14	–	2	.875	27	–	8	.771
No. 9 Gonzaga†	14	–	2	.875	31	–	6	.838
Santa Clara	11	–	5	.688	23	–	10	.697
Loyola Marymount	9	–	7	.563	19	–	12	.613
San Francisco	7	–	9	.438	20	–	14	.588
BYU	7	–	9	.438	19	–	15	.559
Pacific	7	–	9	.438	15	–	18	.455
Portland	5	–	11	.313	14	–	19	.424
San Diego	4	–	12	.250	11	–	20	.355
Pepperdine	2	–	14	.125	9	–	22	.290
† 2023 WCC tournament winner Rankings from AP poll

The 2022–23 Gonzaga Bulldogs men's basketball team represented Gonzaga University, located in Spokane, Washington, in the 2022–23 NCAA Division I men's basketball season. The team, also unofficially nicknamed the "Zags", was led by head coach Mark Few, in his 24th season as head coach, and played home games at the on-campus McCarthey Athletic Center as members of the West Coast Conference (WCC). The Zags finished the regular season 26–5, 14–2 in WCC play, to win a share of the regular season championship. They defeated San Francisco in the semifinals of the WCC tournament before defeating Saint Mary's to win the WCC championship. They received an automatic bid to the NCAA tournament, where they defeated Grand Canyon, TCU, and UCLA to advance to the Elite Eight. There they lost to UConn to finish their season 31–6.

On January 19, 2023, the Zags lost to Loyola Marymount at the McCarthey Athletic Center, ending their 76-game home winning streak, which was the longest in the nation at the time.

== Previous season ==
The Bulldogs finished the 2021–22 season 28–4, 13–1 in WCC play, to win the regular season championship. They defeated San Francisco and Saint Mary's in the WCC tournament to win the tournament championship. As a result, they received the conference's automatic bid to the NCAA tournament as the No. 1 seed in the West region. They were named the overall No. 1 seed for the second consecutive tournament. The Bulldogs defeated Georgia State and Memphis to advance to the Sweet Sixteen. In the Sweet Sixteen, they lost to Arkansas.

== Offseason ==
=== Departures ===
Due to COVID-19, the NCAA ruled in October 2020 that the 2020–21 season would not count against the eligibility of any basketball player, thus giving all players the option to return in 2021–22.

Gonzaga Bulldogs departures
Name	Number	Pos.	Height	Weight	Year	Hometown	Notes
Matthew Lang	23	G	6'3"	185	Senior	Portland, OR	Transferred to Arizona
Will Graves	35	G	6'5"	185	Senior	Eugene, OR	Transferred to Southern Oregon
Andrew Nembhard	3	G	6'5"	193	Senior	Aurora, ON	Declared for 2022 NBA draft; selected 31st overall by the Indiana Pacers
Martynas Arlauskas	5	G	6'7"	205	Junior	Kaunas, Lithuania	Signed with Pieno žvaigždės Pasvalys of the Lithuanian Basketball League (LKL)
Chet Holmgren	34	C	7'0"	195	Freshman	Minneapolis, MN	Declared for 2022 NBA draft; selected 2nd overall by the Oklahoma City Thunder

=== Outgoing transfers ===
Gonzaga outgoing transfers
Name	Number	Pos.	Height	Weight	Year	Hometown	New school	Source
Matthew Lang	23	G	6'3"	185	Senior	Portland, OR	Arizona	
Will Graves	35	G	6'5"	185	Senior	Eugene, OR	Southern Oregon	

=== Incoming transfers ===
Gonzaga incoming transfers
Name	Number	Pos.	Height	Weight	Year	Hometown	Previous school	Years remaining	Date eligible	Source
Efton Reid	15	C	7'0"	240	Sophomore	Richmond, VA	LSU	3	October 1, 2022	
Malachi Smith	13	G	6'4"	210	Junior (redshirt)	Belleville, IL	Chattanooga	2	October 1, 2022	

=== 2022 recruiting class ===
College recruiting
Name	Hometown	School	Height	Weight	Commit date
Braden Huff #16 PF	Glen Ellyn, IL	Glenbard West	6 ft 10 in (2.08 m)	235 lb (107 kg)	Sep 27, 2021
Braden Huff #16 PF	Recruit ratings: Rivals: 247Sports: ESPN: (82)				
Overall recruit ranking: Rivals: 3 247Sports: 4 ESPN: 4
Note: In many cases, Scout, Rivals, 247Sports, On3, and ESPN may conflict in their listings of height and weight.; In these cases, the average was taken. ESPN grades are on a 100-point scale.; Sources: "Gonzaga 2022 Basketball Commitments". Rivals.; "2022 Gonzaga Bulldogs Recruiting Class". ESPN.; "2022 Team Ranking". Rivals.

== Roster ==
Note: Player's year is based on remaining eligibility. The NCAA did not count the 2020–21 season towards eligibility.

2022–23 Gonzaga Bulldogs men's basketball team
Players
Coaches

Pos.	#	Name	Height	Weight	Year	Previous school	Hometown
G	45	Rasir Bolton	6 ft 3 in (1.91 m)	185 lb (84 kg)	Sr	Massanutten Military Academy; Penn State; Iowa State	Petersburg, VA
F	22	Anton Watson	6 ft 8 in (2.03 m)	225 lb (102 kg)	Sr	Gonzaga Prep	Spokane, WA
F	2	Drew Timme	6 ft 10 in (2.08 m)	235 lb (107 kg)	Sr	Pearce	Richardson, TX
G	13	Malachi Smith	6 ft 4 in (1.93 m)	210 lb (95 kg)	RS Jr	Belleville West; Wright State; Chattanooga	Belleville, IL
G	0	Julian Strawther	6 ft 7 in (2.01 m)	205 lb (93 kg)	Jr	Liberty HS	Las Vegas, NV
G	55	Dominick Harris	6 ft 3 in (1.91 m)	185 lb (84 kg)	RS So	Rancho Christian	Murrieta, CA
F	30	Abe Eagle (W)	6 ft 9 in (2.06 m)	225 lb (102 kg)	RS So	Chaminade Prep	Los Angeles, CA
F	25	Colby Brooks (W)	6 ft 7 in (2.01 m)	215 lb (98 kg)	RS So	Loyola HS	Los Angeles, CA
F	33	Ben Gregg	6 ft 10 in (2.08 m)	225 lb (102 kg)	So	Clackamas	Clackamas, OR
F	20	Kaden Perry (redshirt)	6 ft 9 in (2.06 m)	230 lb (104 kg)	So	Battle Ground	Battle Ground, WA
G	5	Hunter Sallis	6 ft 5 in (1.96 m)	180 lb (82 kg)	So	Millard North	Omaha, NE
G	11	Nolan Hickman	6 ft 2 in (1.88 m)	180 lb (82 kg)	So	Wasatch Academy	Seattle, WA
G	32	Joe Few (W)	6 ft 0 in (1.83 m)	160 lb (73 kg)	So	Gonzaga Prep	Spokane, WA
C	15	Efton Reid	7 ft 0 in (2.13 m)	240 lb (109 kg)	So	IMG Academy; LSU	Richmond, VA
F	34	Braden Huff (redshirt)	6 ft 10 in (2.08 m)	235 lb (107 kg)	Fr	Glenbard West	Glen Ellyn, IL
G	4	Kellen Mitchell (W)	6 ft 6 in (1.98 m)	205 lb (93 kg)	Fr	Fairmont Prep	Spring Lake, MI

Head coach

- Mark Few (Oregon)

Assistant coach(es)

- Brian Michaelson (Gonzaga)
- Roger Powell Jr. (Illinois)
- Stephen Gentry (Gonzaga)

Legend

- (C) Team captain
- (S) Suspended
- (I) Ineligible
- (W) Walk-on
- Injured
- Current redshirt

Roster
Last update: September 12, 2022

- Roster is subject to change as/if players transfer or leave the program for other reasons.

== Schedule and results ==
Date time, TV	Rank^{#}	Opponent^{#}	Result	Record	High points	High rebounds	High assists	Site (attendance) city, state
Exhibition
October 28, 2022*; 6:00 p.m., PPV.com	No. 2	vs. No. 11 Tennessee; Legends of Basketball Charity Classic	L 80–99		17 – Timme	10 – Watson	4 – tied	Comerica Center (2,738); Frisco, TX
November 2, 2022*; 6:00 p.m., KHQ	No. 2	Warner Pacific	W 101–70		21 – Timme	8 – Timme	4 – Bolton	McCarthey Athletic Center (6,000); Spokane, WA
Regular season
November 7, 2022*; 6:00 p.m., KHQ/RTNW	No. 2	North Florida	W 104–63	1–0	22 – Timme	8 – Reid III	5 – Hickman	McCarthey Athletic Center (6,000); Spokane, WA
November 11, 2022*; 3:30 p.m., ESPN	No. 2	vs. Michigan State; Armed Forces Classic	W 64–63	2–0	22 – Timme	13 – Timme	4 – Timme	USS Abraham Lincoln (3,572); San Diego, CA
November 16, 2022*; 6:30 p.m., ESPN2	No. 2	at No. 11 Texas	L 74–93	2–1	18 – Timme	9 – Timme	2 – tied	Moody Center (11,313); Austin, TX
November 20, 2022*; 4:30 p.m., ESPN	No. 2	vs. No. 4 Kentucky	W 88–72	3–1	24 – Bolton	14 – Strawther	3 – Timme	Spokane Arena (12,333); Spokane, WA
November 24, 2022*; 9:30 p.m., ESPN	No. 6	vs. Portland State; Phil Knight Legacy quarterfinals	W 102–78	4–1	23 – Smith	6 – tied	8 – Bolton	Veterans Memorial Coliseum (4,512); Portland, OR
November 25, 2022*; 8:30 p.m., ESPN	No. 6	vs. No. 24 Purdue; Phil Knight Legacy semifinals	L 66–84	4–2	22 – Timme	10 – Strawther	5 – Hickman	Moda Center (8,090); Portland, OR
November 27, 2022*; 4:30 p.m., ESPN	No. 6	vs. Xavier; Phil Knight Legacy 3rd-place game	W 88–84	5–2	23 – Strawther	9 – Strawther	7 – Timme	Veterans Memorial Coliseum; Portland, OR
December 2, 2022*; 5:00 p.m., Peacock	No. 14	vs. No. 6 Baylor; Peacock Classic	L 63–64	5–3	16 – Smith	13 – Watson	8 – Hickman	Sanford Pentagon (3,448); Sioux Falls, SD
December 5, 2022*; 6:00 p.m., KHQ/RTNW	No. 18	Kent State	W 73–66	6–3	29 – Timme	17 – Timme	4 – tied	McCarthey Athletic Center (6,000); Spokane, WA
December 9, 2022*; 6:00 p.m., KHQ/RTNW+	No. 18	Washington; Rivalry	W 77–60	7–3	22 – Timme	12 – Strawther	6 – Bolton	McCarthey Athletic Center (6,000); Spokane, WA
December 12, 2022*; 6:00 p.m., KHQ/RTNW	No. 15	Northern Illinois	W 88–67	8–3	26 – Timme	8 – Watson	4 – Hickman	McCarthey Athletic Center (6,000); Spokane, WA
December 17, 2022*; 10:00 a.m., CBS	No. 15	vs. No. 4 Alabama; C.M. Newton Classic	W 100–90	9–3	29 – Timme	10 – Timme	4 – tied	Legacy Arena (15,847); Birmingham, AL
December 20, 2022*; 6:00 p.m., KHQ/RTNW+	No. 11	Montana	W 85–75	10–3	32 – Timme	11 – Timme	5 – Timme	McCarthey Athletic Center (6,000); Spokane, WA
December 28, 2022*; 2:00 p.m., KHQ/RTNW	No. 10	Eastern Oregon	W 120–42	11–3	18 – Timme	10 – Smith	5 – Harris	McCarthey Athletic Center (6,000); Spokane, WA
December 31, 2022; 2:00 p.m., KHQ/RTNW	No. 10	Pepperdine	W 111–88	12–3 (1–0)	35 – Timme	10 – Timme	8 – Watson	McCarthey Athletic Center (6,000); Spokane, WA
January 5, 2023; 8:00 p.m., ESPN2	No. 9	at San Francisco	W 77–75	13–3 (2–0)	21 – Bolton	6 – Strawther	4 – Timme	War Memorial Gymnasium (3,313); San Francisco, CA
January 7, 2023; 7:00 p.m., KHQ/RTNW	No. 9	at Santa Clara	W 81–76	14–3 (3–0)	20 – tied	8 – Gregg	4 – tied	Leavey Center (4,200); Santa Clara, CA
January 12, 2023; 6:30 p.m., ESPN	No. 8	at BYU; Rivalry	W 75–74	15–3 (4–0)	19 – Timme	13 – Timme	5 – tied	Marriott Center (18,987); Provo, UT
January 14, 2023; 7:00 p.m., ESPN2	No. 8	Portland	W 115–75	16–3 (5–0)	27 – Smith	8 – Smith	7 – Sallis	McCarthey Athletic Center (6,000); Spokane, WA
January 19, 2023; 6:00 p.m., KHQ/WCC Network	No. 6	Loyola Marymount	L 67–68	16–4 (5–1)	17 – Timme	7 – Timme	6 – Hickman	McCarthey Athletic Center (6,000); Spokane, WA
January 21, 2023; 7:00 p.m., KAYU/RTNW+	No. 6	at Pacific	W 99–90	17–4 (6–1)	38 – Timme	13 – Watson	4 – tied	Alex G. Spanos Center (6,000); Stockton, CA
January 28, 2023; 4:00 p.m., KHQ/RTNW	No. 14	at Portland	W 82–67	18–4 (7–1)	40 – Strawther	6 – Strawther	5 – Timme	Chiles Center (4,497); Portland, OR
February 2, 2023; 8:00 p.m., CBSSN	No. 12	Santa Clara	W 88–70	19–4 (8–1)	18 – Watson	11 – Timme	5 – Timme	McCarthey Athletic Center (6,000); Spokane, WA
February 4, 2023; 7:30 p.m., ESPN	No. 12	at No. 18 Saint Mary's; Rivalry	L 70–78 ^{OT}	19–5 (8–2)	23 – Timme	5 – tied	2 – Sallis	University Credit Union Pavilion (3,500); Moraga, CA
February 9, 2023; 6:00 p.m., ESPN2	No. 16	San Francisco	W 99–81	20–5 (9–2)	23 – Bolton	10 – Watson	6 – Bolton	McCarthey Athletic Center (6,000); Spokane, WA
February 11, 2023; 7:00 p.m., ESPN2	No. 16	BYU; Rivalry	W 88–81	21–5 (10–2)	26 – Strawther	7 – Timme	8 – Timme	McCarthey Athletic Center (6,000); Spokane, WA
February 16, 2023; 8:00 p.m., CBSSN	No. 13	at Loyola Marymount	W 108–65	22–5 (11–2)	30 – Strawther	6 – Timme	5 – Hickman	Gersten Pavilion (2,772); Los Angeles, CA
February 18, 2023; 4:00 p.m., KHQ/RTNW	No. 13	at Pepperdine	W 97–88	23–5 (12–2)	34 – Timme	7 – tied	4 – Hickman	Firestone Fieldhouse (3,108); Malibu, CA
February 23, 2023; 8:00 p.m., ESPN2	No. 12	San Diego	W 97–72	24–5 (13–2)	22 – Timme	13 – Timme	7 – Bolton	McCarthey Athletic Center (6,000); Spokane, WA
February 25, 2023; 7:00 p.m., ESPN	No. 12	No. 15 Saint Mary's; Rivalry/College Gameday	W 77–68	25–5 (14–2)	19 – Timme	8 – Watson	3 – tied	McCarthey Athletic Center (6,000); Spokane, WA
March 1, 2023*; 6:00 p.m., KHQ/RTNW	No. 10	Chicago State	W 104–64	26–5	17 – Timme	7 – Smith	7 – Watson	McCarthey Athletic Center (6,000); Spokane, WA
WCC tournament
March 6, 2023; 8:30 p.m., ESPN2	(2) No. 9	vs. (6) San Francisco; Semifinals	W 84–73	27–5	20 – Watson	8 – Timme	5 – Timme	Orleans Arena; Paradise, NV
March 7, 2023; 6:00 p.m., ESPN	(2) No. 9	vs. (1) No. 16 Saint Mary's; Championship/Rivalry	W 77–51	28–5	18 – Timme	10 – Watson	5 – Watson	Orleans Arena; Paradise, NV
NCAA tournament
March 17, 2023*; 4:35 p.m., TruTV	(3 W) No. 9	vs. (14 W) Grand Canyon; First Round	W 82–70	29–5	28 – Strawther	11 – Watson	3 – tied	Ball Arena; Denver, CO
March 19, 2023*; 6:40 p.m., TBS	(3 W) No. 9	vs. (6 W) No. 22 TCU; Second Round	W 84–81	30–5	28 – Timme	12 – Watson	4 – Watson	Ball Arena (19,229); Denver, CO
March 23, 2023*; 6:45 p.m., CBS	(3 W) No. 9	vs. (2 W) No. 7 UCLA; Sweet Sixteen	W 79–76	31–5	36 – Timme	13 – Timme	4 – Timme	T-Mobile Arena (18,544); Paradise, NV
March 25, 2023*; 5:49 p.m., TBS	(3 W) No. 9	vs. (4 W) No. 10 UConn; Elite Eight	L 54–82	31–6	12 – Timme	10 – Timme	5 – Hickman	T-Mobile Arena (18,119); Paradise, NV
*Non-conference game. ^{#}Rankings from AP poll. (#) Tournament seedings in parentheses. W=West. All times are in Pacific Time.

== Rankings ==
Ranking movements Legend: ██ Increase in ranking ██ Decrease in ranking т = Tied with team above or below ( ) = First-place votes
	Week																			
Poll	Pre	1	2	3	4	5	6	7	8	9	10	11	12	13	14	15	16	17	18	Final
AP	2 (12)	2 (14)	6	14	18	15	11	10	9	8	6	14	12	16	13	12	10	9	9	Not released
Coaches	2 (5)	2 (7)	5	12	18т	15	12	11	10	8	6	14	14	16	12	12	10	8	9	

== See also ==
- 2022–23 Gonzaga Bulldogs women's basketball team
