= 2022–23 Pacific Tigers men's basketball team =

Sports team season

2022–23 Pacific Tigers men's basketball
- Conference: West Coast Conference
- Record: 15–18 (7–9 WCC)
- Head coach: Leonard Perry (2nd season)
- Assistant coaches: Josh Newman; Justin Brown; Jason Levy
- Home arena: Alex G. Spanos Center

2022–23 West Coast Conference men's basketball standings
	Conf.				Overall
Team	W		L	PCT	W		L	PCT
No. 19 Saint Mary's	14	–	2	.875	27	–	8	.771
No. 9 Gonzaga†	14	–	2	.875	31	–	6	.838
Santa Clara	11	–	5	.688	23	–	10	.697
Loyola Marymount	9	–	7	.563	19	–	12	.613
San Francisco	7	–	9	.438	20	–	14	.588
BYU	7	–	9	.438	19	–	15	.559
Pacific	7	–	9	.438	15	–	18	.455
Portland	5	–	11	.313	14	–	19	.424
San Diego	4	–	12	.250	11	–	20	.355
Pepperdine	2	–	14	.125	9	–	22	.290
† 2023 WCC tournament winner Rankings from AP poll

The 2022–23 Pacific Tigers men's basketball team represented the University of the Pacific during the 2022–23 NCAA Division I men's basketball season. The Tigers were led by second-year head coach Leonard Perry and played their home games at the Alex G. Spanos Center in Stockton, California as members of the West Coast Conference (WCC).

== Previous season ==
The Tigers finished the 2021–22 season 8–22, 3–11 in WCC play, to finish in eighth place. They lost in the first round of the WCC tournament to Loyola Marymount.

== Offseason ==
=== Departures ===
Name	Number	Pos.	Height	Weight	Year	Hometown	Reason for departure
Khaleb Wilson-Rouse	0	G	6' 2"	180	Junior	Chicago, IL	Transferred to New Orleans
Jordan Bell	1	F	6' 8"	221	Senior	Inglewood, CA	Graduated
Pierre Crockrell II	3	G	6' 0"	175	Sophomore	Tacoma, WA	Transferred to UC Irvine
Alphonso Anderson	10	G/F	6' 6"	220	RS Senior	Tacoma, WA	Graduated
Jaden Byers	11	G	6' 2"	165	Freshman	Riverside, CA	Transferred
Jeremiah Bailey	13	F	6' 6"	220	Senior	Fairbanks, AK	Graduated

=== Incoming transfers ===
Name	Number	Pos.	Height	Weight	Year	Hometown	Previous school
Donovan Williams	1	G	6' 5"	200	Junior	Rockford, IL	Oklahoma State
Tyler Beard	3	G	6' 2"	180	Sophomore	Chicago, IL	Georgetown
Jordan Ivy-Curry	12	G	6' 2"	170	Junior	La Marque, TX	UTSA
Cam Denson	13	G	6' 7"		Sophomore	Compton, CA	Triton College
Keylan Boone	20	G/F	6' 8"	220	Senior	Tulsa, OK	Oklahoma State
Judson Martindale	33	G/F	6' 7"	210	Junior	Sudbury, MA	Holy Cross
Makai Richards	34	F	6' 10"	225	Sophomore	Oak Park, CA	Eastern Washington

=== 2022 recruiting class ===
College recruiting information
Name	Hometown	School	Height	Weight	Commit date
Maurice Odum; PG	Union City, NJ	West Oaks Academy	6 ft 1 in (1.85 m)	160 lb (73 kg)	Apr 11, 2022
Maurice Odum; PG	Recruit ratings: Scout: Rivals: (0)				
Overall recruit ranking: Scout: 98 Rivals: nr ESPN: nr
Note: In many cases, Scout, Rivals, 247Sports, On3, and ESPN may conflict in their listings of height and weight.; In these cases, the average was taken. ESPN grades are on a 100-point scale.; Sources: "Pacific 2021 Basketball Commitments". Rivals.; "2021 Pacific Basketball Commits". Scout.; "ESPN". ESPN.; "Scout.com Team Recruiting Rankings". Scout.; "2022 Team Ranking". Rivals.

== Roster ==
2022–23 Pacific Tigers men's basketball team
Players
Coaches

Pos.	#	Name	Height	Weight	Year	Previous school	Hometown
G/F	0	Greg Outlaw	6 ft 4 in (1.93 m)	175 lb (79 kg)	RS Jr	Rezin Orr Academy HS; Central Connecticut State	Chicago, IL
G	1	Donovan Williams	6 ft 5 in (1.96 m)	200 lb (91 kg)	Jr	North Star HS; Oklahoma State	Rockford, IL
G	2	Jalen Brown	6 ft 3 in (1.91 m)	170 lb (77 kg)	Jr	Jefferson HS; Eastern Arizona CC	Portland, OR
G	3	Tyler Beard	6 ft 2 in (1.88 m)	180 lb (82 kg)	So	Hargrave Military Academy; Georgetown	Chicago, IL
G	4	Moe Odum	6 ft 1 in (1.85 m)	160 lb (73 kg)	Fr	West Oaks Academy	New York, NY
G	12	Jordan Ivy-Curry	6 ft 2 in (1.88 m)	180 lb (82 kg)	Jr	La Marque HS; UTSA	La Marque, TX
G/F	13	Cam Denson	6 ft 7 in (2.01 m)	210 lb (95 kg)	So	Compton HS; Triton College	Compton, CA
G	14	Greydon Edwards (W)	6 ft 0 in (1.83 m)	170 lb (77 kg)	So	Pea Ridge HS	Bentonville, AR
C	15	Sam Freeman	6 ft 10 in (2.08 m)	240 lb (109 kg)	RS Jr	Northwest HS; Minnesota	Dallas, TX
G/F	20	Keylan Boone	6 ft 8 in (2.03 m)	200 lb (91 kg)	Sr	Tulsa Memorial HS; Oklahoma State	Tulsa, OK
G	21	Luke Avdalovic	6 ft 5 in (1.96 m)	190 lb (86 kg)	RS Sr	Vista del Lago HS; Northern Arizona	Folsom, CA
G	25	Nick Blake	6 ft 6 in (1.98 m)	200 lb (91 kg)	Jr	IMG Academy; UNLV	Las Vegas, NV
G/F	33	Judson Martindale	6 ft 7 in (2.01 m)	210 lb (95 kg)	Jr	Worcester Academy; Holy Cross	Sudbury, MA
F	34	Makai Richards	6 ft 10 in (2.08 m)	225 lb (102 kg)	RS Fr	Oak Park HS; Eastern Washington	Oak Park, CA

Head coach

- Leonard Perry (Idaho)

Assistant coach(es)

- Luke Wicks (Northern State)
- Justin Brown (Southwest Baptist)
- Jason Levy (Cal State Northridge)

Legend

- (C) Team captain
- (S) Suspended
- (I) Ineligible
- (W) Walk-on
- Injured
- Current redshirt

Roster
Last update: January 17, 2025

== Schedule and results ==
Date time, TV	Rank^{#}	Opponent^{#}	Result	Record	High points	High rebounds	High assists	Site (attendance) city, state
Non-conference regular season
November 7, 2022*; 11:00 a.m., P12N		at Stanford	L 78–88	0–1	23 – Ivy-Curry	5 – Martindale	2 – tied	Maples Pavilion (3,380); Stanford, CA
November 13, 2022*; 11:00 a.m., ESPN+		at North Dakota State	W 91–86	1–1	21 – Beard	4 – tied	4 – Beard	Scheels Center (1,073); Fargo, ND
November 15, 2022*; 5:00 p.m., MidcoSN		at North Dakota	W 93–63	2–1	19 – Avdalovic	5 – tied	2 – Odum	Betty Engelstad Sioux Center (1,298); Grand Forks, ND
November 18, 2022*; 7:00 p.m., WCC Network		Cal State Fullerton	L 91–94 ^{2OT}	2–2	19 – Ivy-Curry	7 – Freeman	3 – Beard	Alex G. Spanos Center (1,496); Stockton, CA
November 22, 2022*; 7:00 p.m., WCC Network		Mount St. Mary's; Pacific Multi-Team Event	L 65–69	2–3	16 – Beard	10 – Williams	2 – Beard	Alex G. Spanos Center (944); Stockton, CA
November 25, 2022*; 6:00 p.m., WCC Network		Idaho; Pacific Multi-Team Event	L 81–84	2–4	19 – Williams	9 – Denson	6 – Beard	Alex G. Spanos Center (956); Stockton, CA
November 28, 2022*; 7:00 p.m., WCC Network		Cal Poly; Pacific Multi-Team Event	L 58–62	2–5	13 – tied	5 – Martindale	4 – Beard	Alex G. Spanos Center (800); Stockton, CA
December 1, 2022*; 6:00 p.m., ESPN+		at UC Davis	W 74–72	3–5	17 – Boone	9 – Ivy-Curry	3 – Beard	University Credit Union Center (1,026); Davis, CA
December 3, 2022*; 2:00 p.m., ESPN+		at UC Santa Barbara	L 71–82	3–6	11 – tied	8 – Freeman	3 – Odum	The Thunderdome (1,623); Santa Barbara, CA
December 6, 2022*; 7:00 p.m., WCC Network		Northern Arizona	L 69–73	3–7	12 – Blake	8 – Boone	2 – tied	Alex G. Spanos Center (852); Stockton, CA
December 10, 2022*; 2:00 p.m., WCC Network		Fresno State	W 76–72	4–7	16 – Ivy-Curry	6 – Denson	4 – Blake	Alex G. Spanos Center (1,792); Stockton, CA
December 11, 2022*; 4:00 p.m., WCC Network		Cal State East Bay	L 73–79	4–8	19 – Blake	5 – tied	5 – Beard	Alex G. Spanos Center (736); Stockton, CA
December 13, 2022*; 6:00 p.m., WCC Network		Stanislaus State	W 80–56	5–8	23 – Avdalovic	7 – tied	4 – Boone	Alex G. Spanos Center (722); Stockton, CA
December 17, 2022*; 4:00 p.m., WCC Network		San Jose State	W 59–58	6–8	17 – Boone	4 – tied	9 – Beard	Alex G. Spanos Center (1,392); Stockton, CA
December 20, 2022*; 5:00 p.m., ESPN+		at Lamar	W 74–65	7–8	15 – Avdalovic	7 – Williams	8 – Odum	Montagne Center (1,313); Beaumont, TX
WCC regular season
December 29, 2022; 6:00 p.m., WCC Network		BYU	L 49–69	7–9 (0–1)	19 – Boone	4 – tied	4 – Odum	Alex G. Spanos Center (2,840); Stockton, CA
December 31, 2022; 2:00 p.m., WCC Network		Loyola Marymount	W 78–72	8–9 (1–1)	23 – Blake	4 – tied	4 – Odum	Alex G. Spanos Center (803); Stockton, CA
January 5, 2023; 7:00 p.m., WCC Network		at San Diego	W 84–82	9–9 (2–1)	27 – Boone	12 – Boone	10 – Odum	Jenny Craig Pavilion (899); San Diego, CA
January 7, 2023; 7:00 p.m., WCC Network		at Pepperdine	W 80–75	10–9 (3–1)	19 – Martindale	8 – Martindale	4 – Odum	Firestone Fieldhouse (626); Malibu, CA
January 14, 2023; 6:00 p.m., NBCSCA		Santa Clara	L 81–92	10–10 (3–2)	17 – Martindale	5 – Boone	5 – Odum	Alex G. Spanos Center (1,380); Stockton, CA
January 19, 2023; 8:00 p.m., NBCSCA		at San Francisco	L 57–78	10–11 (3–3)	15 – Williams	5 – Williams	2 – tied	War Memorial Gymnasium; San Francisco, CA
January 21, 2023; 7:00 p.m., NBCSBA		No. 6 Gonzaga	L 90–99	10–12 (3–4)	17 – Ivy-Curry	4 – tied	3 – Beard	Alex G. Spanos Center (4,376); Stockton, CA
January 28, 2023; 2:00 p.m., WCC Network		at Santa Clara	W 95–89	11–12 (4–4)	27 – Boone	5 – Avdalovic	6 – Odum	Leavey Center (1,805); Santa Clara, CA
February 2, 2023; 7:00 p.m., WCC Network		Pepperdine	W 81–72	12–12 (5–4)	15 – tied	8 – Beard	5 – Odum	Alex G. Spanos Center (1,315); Stockton, CA
February 4, 2023; 6:00 p.m., BYUtv		at BYU	L 66–81	12–13 (5–5)	11 – Ivy-Curry	11 – Ivy-Curry	5 – Odum	Marriott Center (14,431); Provo, UT
February 9, 2023; 6:00 p.m., WCC Network		at Portland	L 73–81	12–14 (5–6)	22 – Boone	6 – Denson	10 – Odum	Chiles Center (1,515); Portland, OR
February 11, 2023; 7:00 p.m., WCC Network		San Diego	W 99–94	13–14 (6–6)	30 – Boone	5 – tied	8 – Odum	Alex G. Spanos Center (1,195); Stockton, CA
February 16, 2023; 8:00 p.m., NBCSBA		San Francisco	L 68–76	13–15 (6–7)	18 – Boone	5 – Denson	4 – Odum	Alex G. Spanos Center (2,317); Stockton, CA
February 18, 2023; 7:00 p.m., WCC Network		at Loyola Marymount	L 88–90	13–16 (6–8)	19 – Martindale	4 – Boone	5 – Odum	Gersten Pavilion (1,598); Los Angeles, CA
February 23, 2023; 7:00 p.m., NBCSBA		at No. 15 Saint Mary's	L 52–83	13–17 (6–9)	11 – Ivy-Curry	4 – tied	4 – Odum	University Credit Union Pavilion (3,500); Moraga, CA
February 25, 2023; 4:00 p.m., NBCSBA		Portland	W 81–77	14–17 (7–9)	12 – tied	7 – Denson	6 – Ivy-Curry	Alex G. Spanos Center (2,529); Stockton, CA
WCC tournament
March 2, 2023; 8:30 p.m., WCC Network	(7)	vs. (10) Pepperdine; First round	W 84–71	15–17	25 – Boone	5 – tied	4 – Martindale	Orleans Arena; Paradise, NV
March 3, 2023; 8:30 p.m., WCC Network	(7)	vs. (6) San Francisco; Second round	L 63–80	15–18	16 – tied	11 – Boone	2 – tied	Orleans Arena (2,786); Paradise, NV
*Non-conference game. ^{#}Rankings from AP poll. (#) Tournament seedings in parentheses. All times are in Pacific.
