= 2022–23 San Francisco Dons men's basketball team =

American college basketball season

2022–23 San Francisco Dons men's basketball
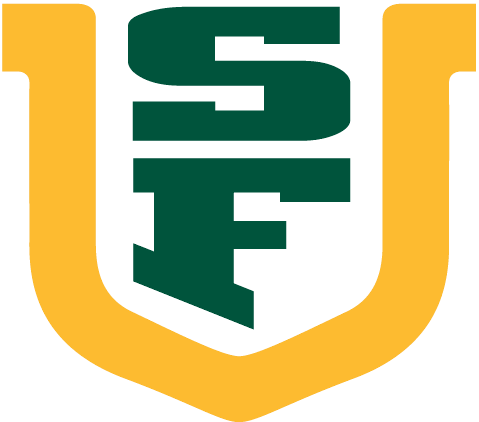

Hall of Fame Classic champions
- Conference: West Coast Conference
- Record: 20–14 (7–9 WCC)
- Head coach: Chris Gerlufsen (1st season)
- Assistant coaches: Michael Plank; Jay Duncan; Kyle Bankhead
- Home arena: War Memorial Gymnasium (Capacity: 3,005)

2022–23 West Coast Conference men's basketball standings
	Conf.				Overall
Team	W		L	PCT	W		L	PCT
No. 19 Saint Mary's	14	–	2	.875	27	–	8	.771
No. 9 Gonzaga†	14	–	2	.875	31	–	6	.838
Santa Clara	11	–	5	.688	23	–	10	.697
Loyola Marymount	9	–	7	.563	19	–	12	.613
San Francisco	7	–	9	.438	20	–	14	.588
BYU	7	–	9	.438	19	–	15	.559
Pacific	7	–	9	.438	15	–	18	.455
Portland	5	–	11	.313	14	–	19	.424
San Diego	4	–	12	.250	11	–	20	.355
Pepperdine	2	–	14	.125	9	–	22	.290
† 2023 WCC tournament winner Rankings from AP poll

The 2022–23 San Francisco Dons men's basketball team represented the University of San Francisco during the 2022–23 NCAA Division I men's basketball season. The Dons were led by first-year head coach Chris Gerlufsen, and played their home games at the War Memorial Gymnasium at the Sobrato Center as members of the West Coast Conference.

== Previous season ==
The Dons finished the 2021–22 season 24–10, 10–6 in WCC play to finish in fourth place. In the WCC tournament, they defeated BYU in the third round before losing to Gonzaga in the semifinals. The Dons received an at-large bid to the NCAA tournament as the No. 10 seed in the East region, their first appearance since 1998. They lost in the first round to Murray State.

The day after the tournament loss, head coach Todd Golden left the team after accepting a head coach position at Florida. Golden assistant Chris Gerlufsen was subsequently named the next head coach.

== Offseason ==
=== Departures ===
Name	Number	Pos.	Height	Weight	Year	Hometown	Reason for departure
Jamaree Bouyea	1	G	6'2"	180	GS senior	Seaside, CA	Graduated/went undrafted in 2022 NBA draft
Patrick Tapé	11	F	6'10"	240	GS senior	Charlotte, NC	Graduated
Maj Dušanić	14	F	6'7"	215	Freshman	Ljubljana, Slovenia	Transferred to Hawaii Pacific
Gabe Stefanini	15	G	6'3"	215	Senior	Bologna, Italy	Graduated/went undrafted in 2022 NBA draft
Dzmitry Ryuny	22	F	6'9"	205	Junior	Minsk, Belarus	Transferred to Oregon
Yauhen Massalski	25	F	6'9"	240	GS senior	Minsk, Belarus	Graduated

=== Incoming transfers ===
Name	Number	Pos.	Height	Weight	Year	Hometown	Previous school
Tyrell Roberts	1	G	5'11"	175	RS senior	Sacramento, CA	Washington State
Saba Gigiberia	5	C	7'1"	248	Junior	Tbilisi, Georgia	Georgia Tech
Marcus Williams	55	G	6'2"	197	Junior	Dickinson, TX	Texas A&M

=== 2022 recruiting class ===
There was no incoming recruiting class of 2022.

== Roster ==
2022–23 San Francisco Dons men's basketball team
Players
Coaches

Pos.	#	Name	Height	Weight	Year	Previous school	Hometown
G	0	Khalil Shabazz	6 ft 1 in (1.85 m)	170 lb (77 kg)	RS Sr	Central Washington	Seattle, WA
G	1	Tyrell Roberts	5 ft 11 in (1.8 m)	175 lb (79 kg)	RS Sr	Washington State	Sacramento, CA
G	2	Julian Rishwain	6 ft 5 in (1.96 m)	190 lb (86 kg)	Jr	Boston College	Los Angeles, CA
F	3	Isaiah Hawthorne	6 ft 8 in (2.03 m)	205 lb (93 kg)	RS So	Tracy HS	Tracy, CA
C	5	Saba Gigiberia	7 ft 1 in (2.16 m)	248 lb (112 kg)	Jr	Georgia Tech	Tbilisi, Georgia
F	10	Toni Rocak	6 ft 9 in (2.06 m)	220 lb (100 kg)	RS Sr	UC San Diego	Geneva, Switzerland
F	11	Josh Kunen	6 ft 8 in (2.03 m)	210 lb (95 kg)	Jr	Centre of Excellence	Melbourne, VIC, Australia
G	12	Justin Bieker (W)	6 ft 5 in (1.96 m)	180 lb (82 kg)	RS So	Jesuit HS	Portland, OR
F	15	Zane Meeks	6 ft 9 in (2.06 m)	220 lb (100 kg)	Jr	Nevada	Prairie Village, KS
F	21	Ndewedo Newbury	6 ft 7 in (2.01 m)	238 lb (108 kg)	So	The Loomis Chaffee School	London, England, UK
G	30	Bryce Whitaker (W)	6 ft 0 in (1.83 m)	170 lb (77 kg)	Jr	Lamar CC	Los Angeles, CA
C	31	Jonas Visser	6 ft 10 in (2.08 m)	240 lb (109 kg)	Jr	Centre for Sports & Education	Amsterdam, Netherlands
C	33	Volodymyr Markovetskyy	7 ft 2 in (2.18 m)	270 lb (122 kg)	Jr	Washington State	Truskavets, Ukraine
G	45	Jake Cioe (W)	6 ft 0 in (1.83 m)	175 lb (79 kg)	So	Salpointe Catholic HS	Tucson, AZ
G	55	Marcus Williams	6 ft 2 in (1.88 m)	197 lb (89 kg)	Jr	Texas A&M	Dickinson, TX

Head coach

- Chris Gerlufsen (Randolph–Macon)

Assistant coach(es)

- Michael Plank (Willamette)
- Jay Duncan (Northwood)
- Kyle Bankhead (Gonzaga)

Legend

- (C) Team captain
- (S) Suspended
- (I) Ineligible
- (W) Walk-on
- Injured
- Current redshirt

Roster

== Schedule and results ==
Date time, TV	Rank^{#}	Opponent^{#}	Result	Record	High points	High rebounds	High assists	Site (attendance) city, state
Non-conference regular season
November 7, 2022*; 7:00 p.m., WCC Network		Texas Southern	W 90–77	1–0	17 – Roberts	10 – Shabazz	3 – Tied	War Memorial Gymnasium (1,730); San Francisco, CA
November 10, 2022*; 7:00 p.m., WCC Network		Cal Poly	W 60–48	2–0	18 – Shabazz	8 – Gigiberia	2 – Tied	War Memorial Gymnasium (847); San Francisco, CA
November 13, 2022*; 2:00 p.m., WCC Network		UC Merced	W 88–71	3–0	21 – Shabazz	9 – Meeks	4 – Tied	War Memorial Gymnasium (1,138); San Francisco, CA
November 16, 2022*; 7:00 p.m., MW Network		at Fresno State	W 67–60	4–0	22 – Roberts	10 – Meeks	4 – Shabazz	Save Mart Center (3,123); Fresno, CA
November 21, 2022*; 9:30 a.m., CBSSN		vs. Northern Iowa; Hall of Fame Classic semifinals	W 75–69	5–0	24 – Shabazz	11 – Meeks	7 – Shabazz	T-Mobile Center (301); Kansas City, MO
November 22, 2022*; 11:00 a.m., CBSSN		vs. Wichita State; Hall of Fame Classic Finals	W 67–63	6–0	15 – Kunen	7 – Kunen	7 – Roberts	T-Mobile Center (512); Kansas City, MO
November 25, 2022*; 11:00 a.m., ESPN+		at Davidson	L 80–89	6–1	20 – Shabazz	6 – Kunen	5 – Williams	John M. Belk Arena (3,426); Davidson, NC
November 30, 2022*; 7:00 p.m., WCC Network		Little Rock	W 90–68	7–1	16 – Shabazz	7 – Shabazz	7 – Shabazz	War Memorial Gymnasium; San Francisco, CA
December 4, 2022*; 5:30 p.m., WCC Network		vs. Utah State	L 64–82	7–2	18 – Roberts	5 – Tied	3 – Tied	Chase Center; San Francisco, CA
December 7, 2022*; 7:30 p.m., WCC Network		Merrimack	W 69–51	8–2	19 – Markovetskyy	10 – Shabazz	7 – Williams	War Memorial Gymnasium (1,733); San Francisco, CA
December 12, 2022*; 8:30 p.m.		vs. New Mexico; Jack Jones Hoopsfest	L 64–67	8–3	18 – Shabazz	9 – Shabazz	5 – Shabazz	Michelob Ultra Arena; Paradise, NV
December 17, 2022*; 2:00 p.m., MW Network		at UNLV	W 75–73	9–3	17 – Tied	17 – Meeks	4 – Roberts	Thomas & Mack Center (6,446); Paradise, NV
December 19, 2022*; 7:00 p.m., WCC Network		UT Arlington	L 63–68	9–4	24 – Roberts	7 – Shabazz	3 – Tied	War Memorial Gymnasium; San Francisco, CA
December 21, 2022*; 7:00 p.m., CBSSN		No. 25 Arizona State	W 97–60	10–4	26 – Shabazz	7 – Shabazz	6 – Shabazz	War Memorial Gymnasium (2,756); San Francisco, CA
December 22, 2022*; 6:00 p.m., WCC Network		Hartford	W 85–53	11–4	20 – Hawthorne	8 – Hawthorne	3 – Tied	War Memorial Gymnasium (1,833); San Francisco, CA
WCC regular season
December 29, 2022; 7:00 p.m., WCC Network		at Santa Clara	L 67–79	11–5 (0–1)	23 – Shabazz	10 – Meeks	3 – Kunen	Leavey Center (1,302); Santa Clara, CA
December 31, 2022; 4:00 p.m., WCC Network		San Diego	L 68–80	11–6 (0–2)	21 – Shabazz	8 – Tied	3 – Williams	War Memorial Gymnasium (1,872); San Francisco, CA
January 5, 2023; 8:00 p.m., ESPN2		No. 9 Gonzaga	L 75–77	11–7 (0–3)	18 – Roberts	9 – Shabazz	2 – Tied	War Memorial Gymnasium (3,313); San Francisco, CA
January 7, 2023; 7:00 p.m., WCC Network		at Loyola Marymount	W 72–70	12–7 (1–3)	21 – Roberts	6 – Rishwain	3 – Rocak	Gersten Pavilion (1,491); Los Angeles, CA
January 12, 2023; 8:00 p.m., ESPNU		at Portland	L 87–92	12–8 (1–4)	25 – Shabazz	8 – Williams	4 – Williams	Chiles Center (1,388); Portland, OR
January 14, 2023; 8:00 p.m., NBCSBA		Saint Mary's	L 61–78	12–9 (1–5)	17 – Meeks	8 – Meeks	3 – Tied	War Memorial Gymnasium; San Francisco, CA
January 19, 2023; 8:00 p.m., NBCSCA		Pacific	W 78–57	13–9 (2–5)	17 – Meeks	11 – Newbury	4 – Tied	War Memorial Gymnasium; San Francisco, CA
January 21, 2023; 5:00 p.m., CBSSN		BYU	W 82–74	14–9 (3–5)	30 – Roberts	5 – Tied	3 – Kunen	War Memorial Gymnasium; San Francisco, CA
January 28, 2023; 7:00 p.m., WCC Network		at San Diego	W 94–81	15–9 (4–5)	26 – Shabazz	6 – Hawthorne	5 – Hawthorne	Jenny Craig Pavilion (1,538); San Diego, CA
February 2, 2023; 8:00 p.m., ESPNU		at No. 18 Saint Mary's	L 59–68	15–10 (4–6)	16 – Shabazz	5 – Shabazz	1 – Tied	University Credit Union Pavilion (3,500); Moraga, CA
February 4, 2023; 7:00 p.m., ESPNU		Santa Clara	L 70–83	15–11 (4–7)	31 – Shabazz	8 – Shabazz	3 – Williams	War Memorial Gymnasium (3,650); San Francisco, CA
February 9, 2023; 6:00 p.m., ESPN2		at No. 16 Gonzaga	L 81–99	15–12 (4–8)	25 – Shabazz	7 – Shabazz	5 – Williams	McCarthey Athletic Center (6,000); Spokane, WA
February 11, 2023; 7:00 p.m., WCC Network		Pepperdine	W 88–80	16–12 (5–8)	32 – Roberts	9 – Newbury	5 – Williams	War Memorial Gymnasium; San Francisco, CA
February 16, 2023; 8:00 p.m., NBCSBA		at Pacific	W 76–68	17–12 (6–8)	26 – Shabazz	7 – Hawthorne	4 – Williams	Alex G. Spanos Center (2,317); Stockton, CA
February 23, 2023; 8:00 p.m., CBSSN		Portland	W 92–89	18–12 (7–8)	30 – Shabazz	7 – Shabazz	6 – Roberts	War Memorial Gymnasium (2,933); San Francisco, CA
February 25, 2023; 7:00 p.m., ESPNU		at BYU	L 61–87	18–13 (7–9)	21 – Shabazz	3 – Tied	3 – Roberts	Marriott Center (15,990); Provo, UT
WCC tournament
March 3, 2023; 8:30 p.m., WCC Network	(6)	vs. (7) Pacific; Second Round	W 80–63	19–13	25 – Roberts	8 – Tied	5 – Williams	Orleans Arena (2,786); Paradise, NV
March 4, 2023; 9:30 p.m., ESPN2	(6)	vs. (3) Santa Clara; Quarterfinals	W 93–87 ^{2OT}	20–13	38 – Shabazz	9 – Hawthorne	5 – Shabazz	Orleans Arena; Paradise, NV
March 6, 2023; 8:30 p.m., ESPN2	(6)	vs. (2) No. 9 Gonzaga; Semifinals	L 73–84	20–14	26 – Shabazz	7 – Tied	4 – Roberts	Orleans Arena; Paradise, NV
*Non-conference game. ^{#}Rankings from AP Poll. (#) Tournament seedings in parentheses. All times are in Pacific Time.
