= 2022–23 San Diego Toreros men's basketball team =

American college basketball season

2022–23 San Diego Toreros men's basketball
- Conference: West Coast Conference
- Record: 11–20 (4–12 WCC)
- Head coach: Steve Lavin (1st season)
- Assistant coaches: John Moore; Tyus Edney; Patrick Sandle
- Home arena: Jenny Craig Pavilion

2022–23 West Coast Conference men's basketball standings
	Conf.				Overall
Team	W		L	PCT	W		L	PCT
No. 19 Saint Mary's	14	–	2	.875	27	–	8	.771
No. 9 Gonzaga†	14	–	2	.875	31	–	6	.838
Santa Clara	11	–	5	.688	23	–	10	.697
Loyola Marymount	9	–	7	.563	19	–	12	.613
San Francisco	7	–	9	.438	20	–	14	.588
BYU	7	–	9	.438	19	–	15	.559
Pacific	7	–	9	.438	15	–	18	.455
Portland	5	–	11	.313	14	–	19	.424
San Diego	4	–	12	.250	11	–	20	.355
Pepperdine	2	–	14	.125	9	–	22	.290
† 2023 WCC tournament winner Rankings from AP poll

The 2022–23 San Diego Toreros men's basketball team represented the University of San Diego during the 2022–23 NCAA Division I men's basketball season. The Toreros were led by first-year head coach Steve Lavin They played their home games at the Jenny Craig Pavilion in San Diego, California, as members of the West Coast Conference.

== Previous season ==
The Toreros finished the 2021–22 season 15–16, 7–9 in WCC play to finish in seventh place. They defeated Pepperdine in the first round of the WCC tournament before losing to Portland in the second round.

== Offseason ==
On March 6, 2022, the school fired head coach Sam Scholl. On April 8, the school hired former UCLA and St. John's head coach Steve Lavin as the team's new head coach. Lavin had not coached since 2015.

=== Departures ===
Name	Number	Pos.	Height	Weight	Year	Hometown	Reason for departure
Bryce Monroe	0	G	5'11"	170	Sophomore	San Francisco, CA	Transferred to IUPUI
Joey Calcaterra	2	G	6'3"	165	RS Senior	Novato, CA	Graduate transferred to UConn
Josh Parrish	4	F	6'4"	215	GS Senior	Arlington, TX	Graduated
Scotty Prunty	5	G	5'11"	165	Sophomore	San Diego, CA	Walk-on; left the team for personal reasons
Alijah Kuehl	14	C	6'10"	235	Freshman	St. Augustine, FL	Left the team for personal reasons
Vladimir Pinchuk	15	C	6'11"	230	Senior	Schwelm, Germany	Graduated
T. J. Berger	20	G	6'4"	170	Sophomore	Malvern, PA	Transferred to Lafayette
Terrell Brown	21	F/C	6'10"	235	GS Senior	Providence, RI	Graduated
Patrick Caero	25	G	6'4"	195	Freshman	Fort Worth, TX	Walk-on; left the team for personal reasons
Muon Reath	33	G/F	6'8"	185	Freshman	Ottawa, ON	Transferred to South Plains College

=== Incoming transfers ===
Name	Num	Pos.	Height	Weight	Year	Hometown	Previous school
Jaiden Delaire	0	F	6'9"	215	GS Senior	North Granby, CT	Stanford
Elliyas Delaire	2	G	6'2"	175	Sophomore	North Granby, CT	Walk-on; Lewis & Clark College
Deuce Turner	4	G	6'1"		Sophomore	Coatesville, PA	South Plains College
Bendji Pierre	5	F	6'8"		Sophomore	Irvington, NJ	Indian River State College
Seikou Sisoho Jawara	12	G	6'3"	195	Junior	Mataró, Spain	Weber State
Deven Dahlke	33	G	6'2"	188	Junior	Phoenix, AZ	Walk-on; Drake
Nic Lynch	44	C	6'11"	250	GS Senior	Seattle, WA	Lehigh
Eric Williams Jr.	50	G	6'7"	195	Grad Senior	Port Huron, MI	Oregon

=== 2022 recruiting class ===
College recruiting information
Name	Hometown	School	Height	Weight	Commit date
Jeremiah Nyarko; PF	Ghana	Sierra Canyon School	6 ft 9 in (2.06 m)	205 lb (93 kg)	May 13, 2022
Jeremiah Nyarko; PF	Recruit ratings: Scout: Rivals: 247Sports: (0)				
Overall recruit ranking: Scout: nr Rivals: nr ESPN: nr
Note: In many cases, Scout, Rivals, 247Sports, On3, and ESPN may conflict in their listings of height and weight.; In these cases, the average was taken. ESPN grades are on a 100-point scale.; Sources: "San Diego Toreros 2022 Basketball Commitments". Rivals.; "2022 San Diego Toreros Basketball Commits". Scout.; "ESPN 2022 San Diego Toreros Basketball recruits". ESPN.; "Scout.com Team Recruiting Rankings". Scout.; "2022 Team Ranking". Rivals.

== Roster ==
2022–23 San Diego Toreros men's basketball team
Players
Coaches

Pos.	#	Name	Height	Weight	Year	Previous school	Hometown
F	0	Jaiden Delaire	6 ft 9 in (2.06 m)	215 lb (98 kg)	GS	Loomis Chaffee School; Stanford	North Granby, CT
G	1	Jase Townsend	6 ft 3 in (1.91 m)	195 lb (88 kg)	RS Sr	Skyline HS; Denver	Dallas, TX
G	2	Elliyas Delaire (W)	6 ft 2 in (1.88 m)	175 lb (79 kg)	So	Loomis Chaffee School; Lewis & Clark College	North Granby, CT
G	3	Wayne McKinney III	6 ft 0 in (1.83 m)	190 lb (86 kg)	So	Coronado HS	Coronado, CA
G	4	Deuce Turner	6 ft 2 in (1.88 m)	185 lb (84 kg)	So	Malvern Prep; South Plains College	Coatesville, PA
F	5	Bendji Pierre	6 ft 8 in (2.03 m)	230 lb (104 kg)	So	The Patrick School; Indian River State College	Irvington, NJ
F	10	Marcellus Earlington	6 ft 7 in (2.01 m)	230 lb (104 kg)	RS Sr	Don Bosco Prep; St. John's	Stony Point, NY
F	11	Yavuz Gultekin	6 ft 7 in (2.01 m)	200 lb (91 kg)	Sr	Bishop Walsh HS; Texas A&M	Karşıyaka, Turkey
G	12	Seikou Sisoho Jawara	6 ft 3 in (1.91 m)	210 lb (95 kg)	Jr	Get Better Academy; Weber State	Mataró, Spain
G	15	Neel Beniwal (W)	6 ft 5 in (1.96 m)	180 lb (82 kg)	Fr	The Phelps School	Garnet Valley, PA
F	20	Jeremiah Nyarko	6 ft 9 in (2.06 m)	205 lb (93 kg)	Fr	Sierra Canyon	Accra, Ghana
G	21	Emmanuel Callas (W)	6 ft 5 in (1.96 m)	215 lb (98 kg)	Fr	Campolindo HS	Oakland, CA
G	32	Dominic Muncey	6 ft 0 in (1.83 m)	175 lb (79 kg)	So	Cathedral Catholic HS	San Diego, CA
G	33	Deven Dahlke (W)	6 ft 2 in (1.88 m)	190 lb (86 kg)	Jr	St. Mary's; Drake	Phoenix, AZ
C	44	Nic Lynch	6 ft 11 in (2.11 m)	260 lb (118 kg)	GS	Seattle Prep; Lehigh	Seattle, WA
G	50	Eric Williams Jr.	6 ft 7 in (2.01 m)	195 lb (88 kg)	RS Sr	New Haven HS; Oregon	Port Huron, MI

Head coach

- Steve Lavin (Chapman University)

Assistant coach(es)

- John Moore (Cypress College)
- Tyus Edney (UCLA)
- Patrick Sandle (San Francisco State)

Legend

- (C) Team captain
- (S) Suspended
- (I) Ineligible
- (W) Walk-on
- Injured
- Current redshirt

Roster

== Schedule and results ==
Date time, TV	Rank^{#}	Opponent^{#}	Result	Record	High points	High rebounds	High assists	Site (attendance) city, state
Non-conference regular season
November 7, 2022*; 7:30 p.m., WCC Network		Sonoma State	W 81–59	1–0	17 – Sisoho Jawara	10 – Earlington	5 – Tied	Jenny Craig Pavilion (919); San Diego, CA
November 9, 2022*; 7:00 p.m., WCC Network		Florida Gulf Coast	W 79–73	2–0	22 – Sisoho Jawara	12 – Williams Jr.	5 – Sisoho Jawara	Jenny Craig Pavilion (956); San Diego, CA
November 13, 2022*; 2:00 p.m., WCC Network		NJIT	W 74–64	3–0	21 – Townsend	12 – Williams Jr.	5 – McKinney III	Jenny Craig Pavilion (835); San Diego, CA
November 17, 2022*; 7:00 p.m., WCC Network		Utah State	L 89–91 ^{OT}	3–1	43 – Williams Jr.	13 – Williams Jr.	4 – McKinney III	Jenny Craig Pavilion (954); San Diego, CA
November 21, 2022*; 7:00 p.m., WCC Network		San Diego Christian	W 98–69	4–1	18 – Townsend	7 – Gultekin	4 – Tied	Jenny Craig Pavilion (882); San Diego, CA
November 25, 2022*; 6:30 p.m., Be The Beast		vs. New Mexico State; Las Vegas Invitational semifinals	L 77–90	4–2	24 – Townsend	12 – Williams Jr.	3 – Tied	Orleans Arena; Paradise, NV
November 26, 2022*; 4:00 p.m., Be The Beast		vs. Nicholls; Las Vegas Invitational consolation	L 70–72	4–3	20 – Townsend	10 – Williams Jr.	3 – Delaire	Orleans Arena; Paradise, NV
November 28, 2022*; 6:00 p.m., WCC Network		Longwood	W 71–68	5–3	15 – Tied	10 – Earlington	5 – Sisoho Jawara	Jenny Craig Pavilion (652); San Diego, CA
December 3, 2022*; 7:00 p.m., WCC Network		UNLV	L 78–95	5–4	16 – Williams Jr.	14 – Williams Jr.	7 – Sisoho Jawara	Jenny Craig Pavilion (1,274); San Diego, CA
December 10, 2022*; 7:00 p.m., WCC Network		Cal Baptist	L 73–76	5–5	18 – Williams Jr.	9 – Williams Jr.	7 – Williams Jr.	Jenny Craig Pavilion (1,067); San Diego, CA
December 12, 2022*; 7:00 p.m., WCC Network		UC San Diego	W 84–58	6–5	21 – Earlington	7 – Williams Jr.	5 – Townsend	Jenny Craig Pavilion (934); San Diego, CA
December 18, 2022*; 4:00 p.m., P12N		at Arizona State	L 67–91	6–6	17 – Williams Jr.	12 – Williams Jr.	2 – Tied	Desert Financial Arena (6,336); Tempe, AZ
December 20, 2022*; 7:00 p.m., ESPN+		at UC Riverside	W 92–84 ^{OT}	7–6	29 – Sisoho Jawara	14 – Williams Jr.	4 – Sisoho Jawara	SRC Arena (307); Riverside, CA
December 22, 2022*; 1:00 p.m., ESPN+		at Cal State Northridge	L 78–83	7–7	25 – Sisoho Jawara	9 – Williams Jr.	3 – Sisoho Jawara	Matadome (211); Northridge, CA
WCC regular season
December 29, 2022; 6:00 p.m., WCC Network		at Saint Mary's	L 58–85	7–8 (0–1)	14 – Tied	8 – Williams Jr.	3 – Sisoho Jawara	University Credit Union Pavilion (3,500); Moraga, CA
December 31, 2022; 4:00 p.m.		at San Francisco	W 80–68	8–8 (1–1)	23 – Earlington	9 – Sisoho Jawara	4 – Townsend	War Memorial Gymnasium (1,872); San Francisco, CA
January 5, 2023; 7:00 p.m.		Pacific	L 82–84	8–9 (1–2)	21 – Earlington	9 – Earlington	6 – Williams Jr.	Jenny Craig Pavilion (899); San Diego, CA
January 7, 2023; 5:00 p.m., BSSD		BYU	L 48–68	8–10 (1–3)	14 – Williams Jr.	9 – Earlington	3 – Sisoho Jawara	Jenny Craig Pavilion (2,157); San Diego, CA
January 12, 2023; 7:00 p.m., BSSD		Pepperdine	W 92–89	9–10 (2–3)	25 – Townsend	10 – Williams Jr.	9 – Williams Jr.	Jenny Craig Pavilion (1,036); San Diego, CA
January 14, 2023; 7:00 p.m.		at Loyola Marymount	L 84–98	9–11 (2–4)	24 – Earlington	8 – Williams Jr.	5 – Townsend	Gersten Pavilion (1,047); Los Angeles, CA
January 19, 2023; 6:00 p.m.		at Portland	L 83–88	9–12 (2–5)	32 – Earlington	11 – Williams Jr.	4 – Sisoho Jawara	Chiles Center (1,200); Portland, OR
January 26, 2023; 7:00 p.m.		at Pepperdine	W 87–78	10–12 (3–5)	30 – Earlington	12 – Earlington	4 – Earlington	Firestone Fieldhouse (732); Malibu, CA
January 28, 2023; 7:00 p.m.		San Francisco	L 81–94	10–13 (3–6)	24 – Earlington	10 – Earlington	3 – Sisoho Jawara	Jenny Craig Pavilion (1,538); San Diego, CA
February 2, 2023; 7:00 p.m.		Portland	L 61–80	10–14 (3–7)	20 – Earlington	8 – Earlington	2 – Tied	Jenny Craig Pavilion (1,210); San Diego, CA
February 4, 2023; 7:00 p.m.		Loyola Marymount	W 87–79	11–14 (4–7)	30 – Earlington	8 – McKinney III	5 – Turner	Jenny Craig Pavilion (2,155); San Diego, CA
February 9, 2022; 7:00 p.m.		at Santa Clara	L 75–80	11–15 (4–8)	22 – Earlington	6 – Tied	5 – Turner	Leavey Center (1,860); Santa Clara, CA
February 11, 2023; 7:00 p.m.		at Pacific	L 94–99	11–16 (4–9)	34 – Townsend	8 – Earlington	4 – Beniwal	Alex G. Spanos Center (1,195); Stockton, CA
February 16, 2023; 6:00 p.m., BSSD		No. 17 Saint Mary's	L 59–62	11–17 (4–10)	17 – Lynch	6 – Jamerson II	4 – McKinney III	Jenny Craig Pavilion (1,951); San Diego, CA
February 23, 2023; 8:00 p.m., ESPN2		at No. 12 Gonzaga	L 72–97	11–18 (4–11)	15 – Townsend	5 – Earlington	5 – Dahlke	McCarthey Athletic Center (6,000); Spokane, WA
February 25, 2022; 7:00 p.m.		Santa Clara	L 63–81	11–19 (4–12)	17 – Earlington	7 – Earlington	2 – McKinney III	Jenny Craig Pavilion (2,898); San Diego, CA
WCC tournament
March 2, 2023; 6:00 p.m., WCC Network	(9)	vs. (8) Portland; First round	L 74–92	11–20	15 – Earlington	8 – Earlington	5 – McKinney III	Orleans Arena; Paradise, NV
*Non-conference game. ^{#}Rankings from AP Poll. (#) Tournament seedings in parentheses. All times are in Pacific Time.
