= 2022 Diamond Head Classic =

College basketball competition

- Season: 2022–23
- Teams: 8
- Finals site: Stan Sheriff Center, Honolulu, Hawaii
- Champions: Hawai’i (1st title)
- Runner-up: SMU (1st title game)
- Semifinalists: Utah State (1st semifinal); Washington State (1st semifinal)
- Winning coach: Eran Ganot (1st title)
- MVP: JoVon McClanahan (Hawai’i)

The 2022 Diamond Head Classic was a mid-season eight-team college basketball tournament that was played on December 22, 23, and 25 at the Stan Sheriff Center in Honolulu, Hawaii. It was the thirteenth annual Diamond Head Classic tournament, and was part of the 2022–23 NCAA Division I men's basketball season. The 2022 field was announced in March, and featured George Washington, Hawaii, Iona, Pepperdine, Seattle, SMU, Utah State and Washington State.

== Bracket ==
* – Denotes overtime period

5th place game December 25
Iona	76
Pepperdine	66
7th place game
Seattle	85
George Washington	67

Consolation 2nd Round; December 23
Iona	83
Seattle	72
George Washington	70
Pepperdine	81

First Round; December 22
Iona	81
SMU	85
Seattle	56
Utah State	84
George Washington	64
Washington State	66
Pepperdine	70
Hawai’i	76

Semifinals; December 23
SMU	77
Utah State	74
Washington State	51
Hawai’i	62

Championship; December 25
SMU	57
Hawai’i	58
3rd place game
Utah State	82
Washington State	73

Notes: All games played at the Stan Sheriff Center in Honolulu, Hawaii.
