= 2022–23 Loyola Marymount Lions men's basketball team =

American college basketball season

2022–23 Loyola Marymount Lions men's basketball

Jamaica Classic Montego Bay champions
- Conference: West Coast Conference
- Record: 19–12 (9–7 WCC)
- Head coach: Stan Johnson (3rd season)
- Assistant coaches: David Carter; Greg Youncofski; David Marek
- Home arena: Gersten Pavilion

2022–23 West Coast Conference men's basketball standings
	Conf.				Overall
Team	W		L	PCT	W		L	PCT
No. 19 Saint Mary's	14	–	2	.875	27	–	8	.771
No. 9 Gonzaga†	14	–	2	.875	31	–	6	.838
Santa Clara	11	–	5	.688	23	–	10	.697
Loyola Marymount	9	–	7	.563	19	–	12	.613
San Francisco	7	–	9	.438	20	–	14	.588
BYU	7	–	9	.438	19	–	15	.559
Pacific	7	–	9	.438	15	–	18	.455
Portland	5	–	11	.313	14	–	19	.424
San Diego	4	–	12	.250	11	–	20	.355
Pepperdine	2	–	14	.125	9	–	22	.290
† 2023 WCC tournament winner Rankings from AP poll

The 2022–23 Loyola Marymount Lions men's basketball team represented Loyola Marymount University during the 2022–23 NCAA Division I men's basketball season. The Lions were led by third-year head coach Stan Johnson and played their home games at Gersten Pavilion in Los Angeles, California as members of the West Coast Conference.

== Previous season ==
The Lions finished the 2021–22 season 11–18, 3–12 in WCC play to finish in ninth place. They defeated Pacific in the first round of the WCC tournament before losing in the second round to BYU.

== Offseason ==
=== Departures ===
Name	Number	Pos.	Height	Weight	Year	Hometown	Reason for departure
Eli Scott	0	G/F	6'6"	232	RS Senior	Chino Hills, CA	Graduated
Joe Quintana	2	G	6'2"	165	RS Senior	West Covina, CA	Graduate and transferred to Cal Baptist
Gary Harris Jr.	3	G	6'6"	193	RS Sophomore	Los Angeles, CA	Transferred
David Elliott IV	4	G	6'3"	185	Freshman	Granada Hills, CA	Transferred to Garden City CC
Quentin Jackson Jr.	10	G	6'3"	185	RS Senior	Cary, NC	Graduated
Mayoum Mayoum	23	G	6'4"	180	Sophomore	Melbourne, Australia	Transferred to Miami Dade College
Ivan Alipiev	35	F	6'8"	215	Senior	Sofia, Bulgaria	Graduated
Anthony Yu	42	G	6'2"	170	Sophomore	Foster City, CA	Walk-on; transferred

=== Incoming transfers ===
Name	Number	Pos.	Height	Weight	Year	Hometown	Previous school
Justin Ahrens	2	F	6'6"	195	GS Senior	Versailles, OH	Ohio State
Noah Taitz	10	G	6'3"	185	Junior	Las Vegas, NV	Stanford
Michael Graham	21	F/C	6'8"	221	Junior	Brooklyn, NY	Elon
Rick Issanza	22	C	7'1"	230	RS Junior	Kinshasa, Congo	Oklahoma
Kian Nader	40	G	6'1"	175	Junior	Calabasas, CA	Chapman

=== Recruiting classes ===
==== 2022 recruiting class ====
College recruiting information
Name	Hometown	School	Height	Weight	Commit date
Chance Stephens; PG	Riverside, CA	Polytechnic HS	6 ft 3 in (1.91 m)	170 lb (77 kg)	Mar 29, 2022
Chance Stephens; PG	Recruit ratings: Scout: Rivals: 247Sports: (0)				
Overall recruit ranking: Scout: nr Rivals: nr ESPN: nr
Note: In many cases, Scout, Rivals, 247Sports, On3, and ESPN may conflict in their listings of height and weight.; In these cases, the average was taken. ESPN grades are on a 100-point scale.; Sources: "Loyola Marymount Lions 2022 Basketball Commitments". Rivals.; "2022 Loyola Marymount Lions Basketball Commits". Scout.; "ESPN 2022 Loyola Marymount Lions Basketball recruits". ESPN.; "Scout.com Team Recruiting Rankings". Scout.; "2022 Team Ranking". Rivals.

==== 2023 recruiting class ====
College recruiting information (2023)
Name	Hometown	School	Height	Weight	Commit date
Aaron McBride; PF	Corona, CA	Centennial HS	6 ft 7 in (2.01 m)	200 lb (91 kg)	Jul 1, 2022
Aaron McBride; PF	Recruit ratings: Scout: Rivals: 247Sports: (0)				
Overall recruit ranking: Scout: nr Rivals: nr ESPN: nr
Note: In many cases, Scout, Rivals, 247Sports, On3, and ESPN may conflict in their listings of height and weight.; In these cases, the average was taken. ESPN grades are on a 100-point scale.; Sources: "Loyola Marymount Lions 2023 Basketball Commitments". Rivals.; "2023 Loyola Marymount Lions Basketball Commits". Scout.; "ESPN 2023 Loyola Marymount Lions Basketball recruits". ESPN.; "Scout.com Team Recruiting Rankings". Scout.; "2023 Team Ranking". Rivals.

== Roster ==
2022–23 Loyola Marymount Lions men's basketball team
Players
Coaches

Pos.	#	Name	Height	Weight	Year	Previous school	Hometown
G	0	Jalin Anderson	6 ft 3 in (1.91 m)	175 lb (79 kg)	Jr	Dream City Christian HS	Jackson, TN
G/F	1	Dameane Douglas	6 ft 7 in (2.01 m)	205 lb (93 kg)	RS Sr	San Joaquin Memorial HS	Hanford, CA
G	2	Justin Ahrens	6 ft 6 in (1.98 m)	195 lb (88 kg)	GS	Versailles HS; Ohio State	Versailles, OH
G	3	Chase Stephens	6 ft 3 in (1.91 m)	170 lb (77 kg)	Fr	Polytechnic HS	Riverside, CA
G	10	Noah Taitz	6 ft 3 in (1.91 m)	185 lb (84 kg)	Jr	Bishop Gorman HS; Stanford	Las Vegas, NV
G	11	Kwane Marble II	6 ft 5 in (1.96 m)	206 lb (93 kg)	Sr	Denver East HS; Wyoming	Denver, CO
G	13	Lamaj Lewis	6 ft 6 in (1.98 m)	205 lb (93 kg)	So	St. John Charter HS	Paramount, CA
G	14	James Nobles	6 ft 4 in (1.93 m)	160 lb (73 kg)	RS Fr	Birmingham Community Charter HS	North Hollywood, CA
G	20	Cameron Shelton	6 ft 2 in (1.88 m)	185 lb (84 kg)	RS Sr	Damien HS; Northern Arizona	Chino, CA
F	21	Michael Graham	6 ft 8 in (2.03 m)	221 lb (100 kg)	Jr	Canterbury School; Elon	Brooklyn, NY
C	22	Rick Issanza	7 ft 1 in (2.16 m)	230 lb (104 kg)	RS Jr	Bella Vista Prep; Oklahoma	Kinshasa, Congo
F	24	Alex Merkviladze	6 ft 9 in (2.06 m)	230 lb (104 kg)	Jr	Modesto Christian School; Cal State Northridge	Kutaisi, Georgia
F	34	Keli Leaupepe	6 ft 6 in (1.98 m)	245 lb (111 kg)	Sr	Box Hill Senior	Melbourne, Australia
G	40	Kian Nader (W)	6 ft 1 in (1.85 m)	170 lb (77 kg)	Jr	Viewpoint School; Chapman	Tarzana, CA

Head coach

- Stan Johnson (Bemidji State)

Assistant coach(es)

- David Carter (Saint Mary's)
- Greg Youncofski (Kansas)
- David Marek (Southern Utah)

Legend

- (C) Team captain
- (S) Suspended
- (I) Ineligible
- (W) Walk-on
- Injured
- Current redshirt

Roster

== Schedule and results ==
Date time, TV	Rank^{#}	Opponent^{#}	Result	Record	High points	High rebounds	High assists	Site (attendance) city, state
Non-conference regular season
November 7, 2022*; 7:00 p.m., WCC Network		Life Pacific	W 99–49	1–0	15 – Tied	13 – Graham	8 – Anderson	Gersten Pavilion (1,112); Los Angeles, CA
November 10, 2022*; 7:00 p.m., WCC Network		UC Riverside	L 79–81	1–1	23 – Shelton	8 – Merkviladze	4 – Tied	Gersten Pavilion (1,022); Los Angeles, CA
November 12, 2022*; 7:00 p.m., WCC Network		UC Davis	W 85–75	2–1	24 – Shelton	12 – Leaupepe	6 – Shelton	Gersten Pavilion; Los Angeles, CA
November 15, 2022*; 7:00 p.m., ESPN+		at UC Irvine	L 64–79	2–2	18 – Shelton	9 – Graham	3 – Tied	Bren Events Center (3,136); Irvine, CA
November 18, 2022*; 1:30 p.m., CBSSN		vs. Georgetown; Jamaica Classic Semifinal	W 84–66	3–2	15 – Leaupepe	9 – Tied	5 – Shelton	Montego Bay Convention Centre; Montego Bay, Jamaica
November 20, 2022*; 11:30 a.m., CBSSN		vs. Wake Forest; Jamaica Classic Final	W 77–75 ^{OT}	4–2	23 – Stephens	10 – Leaupepe	2 – Anderson	Montego Bay Convention Centre; Montego Bay, Jamaica
November 23, 2022*; 12:00 p.m., WCC Network		Morgan State; Jamaica Classic campus site game	W 81–80 ^{OT}	5–2	29 – Leaupepe	11 – Leaupepe	4 – Shelton	Gersten Pavilion (586); Los Angeles, CA
November 25, 2022*; 12:00 p.m., WCC Network		Bellarmine	W 80–59	6–2	15 – Tied	7 – Leaupepe	4 – Shelton	Gersten Pavilion (634); Los Angeles, CA
November 30, 2022*; 6:00 p.m.		at Colorado State	L 71–87	6–3	21 – Shelton	8 – Shelton	4 – Shelton	Moby Arena (4,342); Fort Collins, CO
December 3, 2022*; 7:00 p.m., WCC Network		Nevada	W 64–52	7–3	24 – Shelton	8 – Leaupepe	5 – Anderson	Gersten Pavilion (1,121); Los Angeles, CA
December 7, 2022*; 6:00 p.m., WCC Network		at Grand Canyon	W 69–65	8–3	26 – Shelton	6 – Merkviladze	4 – Shelton	GCU Arena (7,011); Phoenix, AZ
December 10, 2022*; 9:30 p.m.		vs. Utah State; Jack Jones Hoopfest	L 67–79	8–4	25 – Shelton	6 – Leaupepe	3 – Shelton	Michelob Ultra Arena; Paradise, NV
December 18, 2022*; 2:00 p.m., WCC Network		Cleveland State	W 70–59	9–4	15 – Tied	11 – Graham	4 – Tied	Gersten Pavilion (723); Los Angeles, CA
December 21, 2022*; 7:00 p.m., WCC Network		Tulsa	W 76–64	10–4	24 – Shelton	10 – Shelton	7 – Shelton	Gersten Pavilion (652); Los Angeles, CA
WCC regular season
December 29, 2022; 6:00 p.m.		at Portland	W 92–72	11–4 (1–0)	18 – Ahrens	9 – Shelton	12 – Shelton	Chiles Center (1,820); Portland, OR
December 31, 2022; 2:00 p.m., WCC Network		at Pacific	L 72–78	11–5 (1–1)	20 – Anderson	6 – Merkviladze	4 – Shelton	Alex G. Spanos Center (803); Stockton, CA
January 5, 2023; 8:00 p.m., ESPNU		BYU	W 64–59	12–5 (2–1)	15 – Leaupepe	6 – Tied	6 – Shelton	Gersten Pavilion (1,147); Los Angeles, CA
January 7, 2023; 7:00 p.m.		San Francisco	L 70–72	12–6 (2–2)	22 – Leaupepe	7 – Tied	6 – Shelton	Gersten Pavilion (1,491); Los Angeles, CA
January 12, 2023; 6:00 p.m., CBSSN		at Saint Mary's	L 62–76	12–7 (2–3)	18 – Shelton	8 – Leaupepe	4 – Shelton	University Credit Union Pavilion (3,315); Moraga, CA
January 14, 2023; 7:00 p.m.		San Diego	W 98–84	13–7 (3–3)	28 – Shelton	9 – Leaupepe	7 – Shelton	Gersten Pavilion (1,047); Los Angeles, CA
January 19, 2023; 6:00 p.m., BSSC+		at No. 6 Gonzaga	W 68–67	14–7 (4–3)	27 – Shelton	10 – Graham	3 – Leaupepe	McCarthey Athletic Center (6,000); Spokane, WA
January 26, 2023; 7:00 p.m., WCC Network		Portland	W 79–60	15–7 (5–3)	20 – Shelton	10 – Graham	3 – Shelton	Gersten Pavilion (1,306); Los Angeles, CA
January 28, 2023; 8:00 p.m., BSSC		Pepperdine	W 84–70	16–7 (6–3)	26 – Shelton	9 – Issanza	7 – Shelton	Gersten Pavilion (2,234); Los Angeles, CA
February 2, 2023; 6:00 p.m., CBSSN		at BYU	L 61–89	16–8 (6–4)	19 – Anderson	6 – Leaupepe	2 – Tied	Marriott Center (13,363); Provo, UT
February 4, 2023; 7:00 p.m.		at San Diego	L 79–87	16–9 (6–5)	25 – Shelton	15 – Graham	4 – Shelton	Jenny Craig Pavilion (2,155); San Diego, CA
February 9, 2023; 7:00 p.m., BSSC		No. 15 Saint Mary's	W 78–74 ^{OT}	17–9 (7–5)	31 – Shelton	6 – Issanza	4 – Shelton	Gersten Pavilion (1,775); Los Angeles, CA
February 11, 2023; 4:00 p.m., BSSC		at Santa Clara	L 69–71	17–10 (7–6)	36 – Shelton	15 – Leaupepe	3 – Tied	Leavey Center (2,850); Santa Clara, CA
February 16, 2023; 8:00 p.m., CBSSN		No. 13 Gonzaga	L 65–108	17–11 (7–7)	15 – Shelton	8 – Graham	3 – Anderson	Gersten Pavilion (2,772); Los Angeles, CA
February 18, 2023; 7:00 p.m., WCC Network		Pacific	W 90–88	18–11 (8–7)	40 – Shelton	11 – Leaupepe	4 – Shelton	Gersten Pavilion (1,598); Los Angeles, CA
February 25, 2023; 7:30 p.m., BSSC		at Pepperdine	W 75–67	19–11 (9–7)	32 – Shelton	7 – Merkviladze	4 – Shelton	Firestone Fieldhouse (1,422); Malibu, CA
WCC tournament
March 4, 2023; 7:00 p.m., ESPN2	(4)	vs. (5) BYU; Quarterfinals	L 63–73	19–12	27 – Shelton	5 – Tied	6 – Shelton	Orleans Arena; Paradise, NV
*Non-conference game. ^{#}Rankings from AP Poll. (#) Tournament seedings in parentheses.
