= 2022–23 Pepperdine Waves men's basketball team =

American college basketball season

2022–23 Pepperdine Waves men's basketball
- Conference: West Coast Conference
- Record: 9–22 (2–14 WCC)
- Head coach: Lorenzo Romar (5th, 8th overall season)
- Associate head coach: Ken Bone
- Assistant coaches: Curtis Allen; Gerald Brown
- Home arena: Firestone Fieldhouse

2022–23 West Coast Conference men's basketball standings
	Conf.				Overall
Team	W		L	PCT	W		L	PCT
No. 19 Saint Mary's	14	–	2	.875	27	–	8	.771
No. 9 Gonzaga†	14	–	2	.875	31	–	6	.838
Santa Clara	11	–	5	.688	23	–	10	.697
Loyola Marymount	9	–	7	.563	19	–	12	.613
San Francisco	7	–	9	.438	20	–	14	.588
BYU	7	–	9	.438	19	–	15	.559
Pacific	7	–	9	.438	15	–	18	.455
Portland	5	–	11	.313	14	–	19	.424
San Diego	4	–	12	.250	11	–	20	.355
Pepperdine	2	–	14	.125	9	–	22	.290
† 2023 WCC tournament winner Rankings from AP poll

The 2022–23 Pepperdine Waves men's basketball team represented Pepperdine University during the 2022–23 NCAA Division I men's basketball season. The Waves were led by head coach Lorenzo Romar, in the fifth season of his second stint after coaching the Waves from 1996 to 1999. They played their home games at the Firestone Fieldhouse in Malibu, California as members of the West Coast Conference.

== Previous season ==
The Waves finished the 2021–22 season 7–25, 1–15 in WCC play to finish in last place. They lost in the first round to San Diego of the WCC tournament.

== Offseason ==
=== Departures ===
Name	Number	Pos.	Height	Weight	Year	Hometown	Reason for departure
Darryl Polk Jr.	2	G	5'9"	155	Senior	Long Beach, CA	Left the team for personal reasons
Keith Fisher III	3	F	6'8"	225	GS Senior	Los Angeles, CA	Graduated
Jade Smith	5	G	6'4"	165	RS Senior	Oakland, CA	Left the team for personal reasons
Kendall Munson	12	F	6'8"	220	Sophomore	Seattle, WA	Transferred to Portland State
Malachy Caffrey	13	G	6'1"	175	Sophomore	Yakima, WA	Transferred to Green River College
Victor Ohia Obioha	34	C	6'9"	220	Senior	Owerri, Nigeria	Graduate transferred
Braun Hartfield	55	G	6'6"	185	RS Senior	Cleveland, OH	Graduated

=== Incoming transfers ===
Name	Number	Pos.	Height	Weight	Year	Hometown	Previous school
Boubacar Coulibaly	12	F	6'10"	215	Junior	Bamako, Mali	USC

=== Recruiting classes ===
==== 2022 recruiting class ====
College recruiting
Name	Hometown	School	Height	Weight	Commit date
Jevon Porter #32 PF	Columbia, MO	Father Tolton Catholic High School	6 ft 6 in (1.98 m)	190 lb (86 kg)	Sep 20, 2020
Jevon Porter #32 PF	Recruit ratings: Scout: Rivals: 247Sports: ESPN: (82)				
Cord Stansberry; PG	Bermuda Dunes, CA	Shadow Hills High School	6 ft 3 in (1.91 m)	175 lb (79 kg)	May 4, 2020
Cord Stansberry; PG	Recruit ratings: Scout: Rivals: 247Sports: ESPN: (NR)				
Malik Moore; SG	Ventura, CA	Heritage Christian School	6 ft 5 in (1.96 m)	185 lb (84 kg)	Sep 5, 2021
Malik Moore; SG	Recruit ratings: Scout: Rivals: 247Sports: ESPN: (NR)				
Jalen Pitre; PF	Long Beach, CA	Woodstock Academy	6 ft 8 in (2.03 m)	220 lb (100 kg)	Aug 16, 2021
Jalen Pitre; PF	Recruit ratings: Scout: Rivals: 247Sports: ESPN: (NR)				
Overall recruit ranking: Scout: nr Rivals: nr ESPN: nr
Note: In many cases, Scout, Rivals, 247Sports, On3, and ESPN may conflict in their listings of height and weight.; In these cases, the average was taken. ESPN grades are on a 100-point scale.; Sources: "Pepperdine Waves 2022 Basketball Commitments". Rivals.; "2022 Pepperdine Waves Basketball Commits". Scout.; "ESPN 2022 Pepperdine Waves Basketball recruits". ESPN.; "Scout.com Team Recruiting Rankings". Scout.; "2022 Team Ranking". Rivals.

==== 2023 recruiting class ====
College recruiting (2023)
Name	Hometown	School	Height	Weight	Commit date
Ariik Mawien; SG	Sioux Falls, SD	Capistrano Valley Christian Schools	6 ft 4 in (1.93 m)	165 lb (75 kg)	Jul 8, 2021
Ariik Mawien; SG	Recruit ratings: Scout: Rivals: 247Sports: ESPN: (NR)				
Overall recruit ranking: Scout: nr Rivals: nr ESPN: nr
Note: In many cases, Scout, Rivals, 247Sports, On3, and ESPN may conflict in their listings of height and weight.; In these cases, the average was taken. ESPN grades are on a 100-point scale.; Sources: "Pepperdine Waves 2023 Basketball Commitments". Rivals.; "2023 Pepperdine Waves Basketball Commits". Scout.; "ESPN 2022 Pepperdine Waves Basketball recruits". ESPN.; "Scout.com Team Recruiting Rankings". Scout.; "2023 Team Ranking". Rivals.

== Roster ==
2022–23 Pepperdine Waves men's basketball team
Players
Coaches

Pos.	#	Name	Height	Weight	Year	Previous school	Hometown
G	0	Houston Mallette	6 ft 4 in (1.93 m)	185 lb (84 kg)	So	Pacifica Christian HS	Oakland, CA
G	1	Mike Mitchell, Jr.	6 ft 2 in (1.88 m)	185 lb (84 kg)	So	Archbishop Mitty HS	San Jose, CA
F	2	Jalen Pitre	6 ft 8 in (2.03 m)	220 lb (100 kg)	Fr	Woodstock Academy	Long Beach, CA
G	3	Malik Moore	6 ft 5 in (1.96 m)	185 lb (84 kg)	Fr	Heritage Christian School	Ventura, CA
G	5	Jay Yoon (W)	6 ft 4 in (1.93 m)	195 lb (88 kg)	RS Sr	Arcadia HS	Arcadia, CA
F	10	Paul Jordan (W)	6 ft 5 in (1.96 m)	200 lb (91 kg)	RS Fr	Long Island Lutheran HS	Glen Cove, NY
C	11	Carson Basham	6 ft 10 in (2.08 m)	210 lb (95 kg)	So	AZ Compass Prep	Phoenix, AZ
F	12	Boubacar Coulibaly	6 ft 10 in (2.08 m)	215 lb (98 kg)	Jr	San Gabriel Academy; USC	Bamako, Mali
G	13	Cord Stansberry	6 ft 3 in (1.91 m)	175 lb (79 kg)	Fr	Woodstock Academy	Long Beach, CA
F	14	Jevon Porter	6 ft 11 in (2.11 m)	220 lb (100 kg)	Fr	Tolton HS	Columbia, MO
G	22	Majok Deng	6 ft 4 in (1.93 m)	190 lb (86 kg)	RS Jr	Salpointe Catholic HS	Tucson, AZ
F	24	Maxwell Lewis	6 ft 7 in (2.01 m)	195 lb (88 kg)	So	AZ Compass Prep	Las Vegas, NV
F	31	Jan Zidek	6 ft 9 in (2.06 m)	240 lb (109 kg)	Sr	Gymnasium Ota Pavel	Prague, Czech Republic
G	33	David Mager (W)	6 ft 3 in (1.91 m)	175 lb (79 kg)	Fr	Dwight-Englewood School	Englewood, NJ
F	35	Aladji Gassama	6 ft 10 in (2.08 m)	205 lb (93 kg)	RS Fr	De Smet Jesuit HS	Bamako, Mali

Head coach

- Lorenzo Romar (Washington)

Assistant coach(es)

- Ken Bone (Seattle Pacific)
- Curtis Allen (Washington)
- Gerald Brown (Pepperdine)

Legend

- (C) Team captain
- (S) Suspended
- (I) Ineligible
- (W) Walk-on
- Injured
- Current redshirt

Roster

== Schedule and results ==
Date time, TV	Rank^{#}	Opponent^{#}	Result	Record	High points	High rebounds	High assists	Site (attendance) city, state
Non conference regular season
November 7, 2022*; 7:00 p.m., WCC Network		Rice	W 106–67	1–0	29 – Lewis	7 – Porter	8 – Mitchell Jr.	Firestone Fieldhouse (1,258); Malibu, CA
November 11, 2022*; 7:00 p.m., ESPN+		at Cal State Fullerton	L 71–74	1–1	15 – Tied	10 – Porter	3 – Lewis	Titan Gym (1,140); Fullerton, CA
November 13, 2022*; 2:00 p.m., WCC Network		Alabama State	W 91–62	2–1	23 – Mitchell Jr.	10 – Porter	5 – Tied	Firestone Fieldhouse (568); Malibu, CA
November 15, 2022*; 7:00 p.m., WCC Network		Vanguard	W 94–80	3–1	23 – Porter	9 – Lewis	7 – Mallette	Firestone Fieldhouse (610); Malibu, CA
November 19, 2022*; 5:00 p.m., WCC Network		UC Irvine	W 64–55	4–1	20 – Mallette	9 – Porter	5 – Mitchell Jr.	Firestone Fieldhouse (904); Malibu, CA
November 23, 2022*; 7:30 p.m., P12N		at No. 19 UCLA	L 53–100	4–2	13 – Tied	8 – Mallette	3 – Moore	Pauley Pavilion (8,107); Los Angeles, CA
November 30, 2022*; 7:00 p.m., WCC Network		Cal Poly	Cancelled due to health & safety protocols					Firestone Fieldhouse; Malibu, CA
December 3, 2022*; 5:00 p.m., WCC Network		Northern Arizona	W 88–69	5–2	30 – Lewis	9 – Basham	5 – Tied	Firestone Fieldhouse (351); Malibu, CA
December 6, 2022*; 7:00 p.m., WCC Network		Nevada	L 77–85	5–3	18 – Tied	10 – Porter	2 – Tied	Firestone Fieldhouse (633); Malibu, CA
December 10, 2022*; 5:00 p.m., WCC Network		UC Santa Barbara	L 64–67 ^{OT}	5–4	24 – Lewis	9 – Coulibaly	4 – Lewis	Firestone Fieldhouse (651); Malibu, CA
December 17, 2022*; 5:00 p.m., ESPN+		at Grand Canyon; Rescheduled from Nov. 26	L 73–83 ^{OT}	5–5	19 – Mallette	10 – Porter	7 – Mitchell Jr.	GCU Arena (7,072); Phoenix, AZ
December 19, 2022*; 1:00 p.m., WCC Network		Cal State Los Angeles	W 92–69	6–5	26 – Lewis	9 – Mitchell Jr.	11 – Mitchell Jr.	Firestone Fieldhouse (500); Malibu, CA
December 22, 2022*; 8:30 p.m., ESPN2		at Hawai'i; Diamond Head Classic Quarterfinals	L 70–76	6–6	23 – Lewis	7 – Lewis	2 – Tied	Stan Sheriff Center (5,087); Honolulu, HI
December 23, 2022*; 7:00 p.m., ESPN2		vs. George Washington; Diamond Head Classic Consolation Round	W 81–70	7–6	22 – Lewis	14 – Porter	5 – Lewis	Stan Sheriff Center; Honolulu, HI
December 25, 2022*; 12:30 p.m., ESPN2		vs. Iona; Diamond Head Classic 5th Place Game	L 66–76	7–7	23 – Lewis	7 – Porter	7 – Mitchell Jr.	Stan Sheriff Center (3,897); Honolulu, HI
WCC regular season
December 31, 2022; 2:00 p.m., BSSC		at No. 10 Gonzaga	L 88–111	7–8 (0–1)	20 – Lewis	7 – Porter	7 – Mitchell Jr.	McCarthey Athletic Center (6,000); Spokane, WA
January 5, 2023; 7:00 p.m., WCC Network		Santa Clara	L 79–89	7–9 (0–2)	20 – Lewis	6 – Porter	4 – Lewis	Firestone Fieldhouse (682); Malibu, CA
January 7, 2023; 5:00 p.m., WCC Network		Pacific	L 75–80	7–10 (0–3)	30 – Lewis	14 – Lewis	9 – Mitchell Jr.	Firestone Fieldhouse (626); Malibu, CA
January 12, 2023; 7:00 p.m., BSSC		at San Diego	L 89–92	7–11 (0–4)	21 – Porter	8 – Basham	5 – Mitchell Jr.	Jenny Craig Pavilion (1,036); San Diego, CA
January 14, 2023; 6:00 p.m., BYUtv		at BYU	L 81–91	7–12 (0–5)	19 – Mallette	5 – Basham	4 – Mitchell Jr.	Marriott Center (14,434); Provo, UT
January 19, 2023; 8:00 p.m., ESPN Networks		Saint Mary's	L 44–73	7–13 (0–6)	15 – Mallette	5 – Tied	5 – Mitchell Jr.	Firestone Fieldhouse (1,050); Malibu, CA
January 21, 2023; 3:00 p.m., BSSC		at Portland	L 76–91	7–14 (0–7)	18 – Lewis	10 – Porter	6 – Lewis	Chiles Center (1,364); Portland, OR
January 26, 2023; 7:00 p.m., WCC Network		San Diego	L 78–87	7–15 (0–8)	20 – Mitchell Jr.	7 – Tied	7 – Mitchell Jr.	Firestone Fieldhouse (732); Malibu, CA
January 28, 2023; 8:00 p.m., BSSC		at Loyola Marymount	L 70–84	7–16 (0–9)	21 – Lewis	8 – Porter	4 – Mitchell Jr.	Gersten Pavilion (2,234); Los Angeles, CA
February 2, 2023; 7:00 p.m., WCC Network		at Pacific	L 72–81	7–17 (0–10)	18 – Lewis	11 – Porter	5 – Moore	Alex G. Spanos Center (1,315); Stockton, CA
February 4, 2023; 5:00 p.m., WCC Network		Portland	W 94–93 ^{2OT}	8–17 (1–10)	25 – Mallette	11 – Porter	5 – Tied	Firestone Fieldhouse (714); Malibu, CA
February 9, 2023; 8:00 p.m., CBSSN		BYU	W 92–80	9–17 (2–10)	30 – Porter	10 – Porter	11 – Mitchell Jr.	Firestone Fieldhouse (1,059); Malibu, CA
February 11, 2023; 7:00 p.m., WCC Network		at San Francisco	L 80–88	9–18 (2–11)	22 – Mitchell Jr.	7 – Tied	4 – Mallette	War Memorial Gymnasium; San Francisco, CA
February 18, 2023; 4:00 p.m., BSSC		No. 13 Gonzaga	L 88–97	9–19 (2–12)	22 – Mallette	7 – Basham	7 – Mitchell Jr.	Firestone Fieldhouse (3,108); Malibu, CA
February 23, 2023; 7:00 p.m., WCC Network		at Santa Clara	L 82–91	9–20 (2–13)	15 – Zidek	10 – Porter	5 – Mitchell Jr.	Leavey Center (2,082); Santa Clara, CA
February 25, 2023; 7:30 p.m., BSSC		Loyola Marymount	L 67–75	9–21 (2–14)	22 – Zidek	7 – Porter	5 – Mitchell Jr.	Firestone Fieldhouse (1,422); Malibu, CA
WCC tournament
March 2, 2023; 8:30 p.m., WCC Network	(10)	vs. (7) Pacific; First round	L 71–84	9–22	16 – Lewis	7 – Lewis	4 – Mitchell Jr.	Orleans Arena; Paradise, NV
*Non-conference game. ^{#}Rankings from AP Poll. (#) Tournament seedings in parentheses. All times are in Pacific Time.
