= 2022–23 Hawaii Rainbow Warriors basketball team =

American college basketball season

2022–23 Hawaii Rainbow Warriors basketball

Diamond Head Classic champions North Shore Classic champions
- Conference: Big West Conference
- Record: 22–11 (13–7 Big West)
- Head coach: Eran Ganot (8th season)
- Associate head coach: John Montgomery
- Assistant coaches: Brad Davidson; Rob Jones
- Captains: Samuta Avea; Kamaka Hepa
- Home arena: Stan Sheriff Center (Capacity: 10,300)

2022–23 Big West men's basketball standings
	Conf.				Overall
Team	W		L	PCT	W		L	PCT
UC Santa Barbara †	15	–	5	.750	27	–	8	.771
UC Irvine	15	–	5	.750	23	–	12	.657
UC Riverside	14	–	6	.700	22	–	12	.647
Cal State Fullerton	12	–	6	.667	20	–	13	.606
Hawai'i	13	–	7	.650	22	–	11	.667
UC Davis	11	–	8	.579	18	–	14	.563
Long Beach State	11	–	9	.550	17	–	16	.515
Cal State Bakersfield	6	–	14	.300	11	–	22	.333
UC San Diego*	5	–	13	.278	10	–	20	.333
Cal State Northridge	4	–	16	.200	7	–	25	.219
Cal Poly	1	–	18	.053	8	–	25	.242
† 2023 Big West tournament winner * ineligible for the 2023 NCAA tournament due to transition period

The 2022–23 Hawaii Rainbow Warriors men's basketball team represented the University of Hawaiʻi at Mānoa during the 2022–23 NCAA Division I men's basketball season. The Rainbow Warriors, led by Eran Ganot in his eighth season, played their games at SimpliFi Arena at Stan Sheriff Center as a member of the Big West Conference.

== Previous season ==
The Rainbow Warriors finished the 2021–22 season 17–11, 10–5 in Big West play to finish in third place. They defeated UC Riverside in the quarterfinals of the Big West tournament before losing to Cal State Fullerton in the semifinals.

== Roster ==
2022–23 Hawaii Rainbow Warriors men's basketball team
Players
Coaches

Pos.	#	Name	Height	Weight	Year	Previous school	Hometown
G	0	Kody Williams (W)	6 ft 0 in (1.83 m)	190 lb (86 kg)	Fr	South Kent School	Minnetonka, Minnesota
G	1	Amoro Lado	6 ft 2 in (1.88 m)	175 lb (79 kg)	So	Vallivue HS; College of Southern Idaho	Nampa, Idaho
G	2	Justus Jackson	6 ft 1 in (1.85 m)	170 lb (77 kg)	So	DME Academy	Surprise, Arizona
G	3	JoVon McClanahan	5 ft 10 in (1.78 m)	175 lb (79 kg)	Jr	Salesian College Prep; Sheridan College (WY)	Vallejo, California
G	4	Noel Coleman	6 ft 1 in (1.85 m)	175 lb (79 kg)	Jr	Sunrise Christian Academy; San Diego	Leopoldsburg, Belgium
F	5	Bernardo da Silva	6 ft 9 in (2.06 m)	215 lb (98 kg)	Jr	Wasatch Academy	Rio das Ostras, Brazil
G	10	Beon Riley	6 ft 6 in (1.98 m)	225 lb (102 kg)	So	Cathedral Catholic HS	Chula Vista, California
F	13	Matija Svetozarevic	6 ft 8 in (2.03 m)	230 lb (104 kg)	So	Prokopovic HS; Portland	Niš, Serbia
F	14	Harry Rouhliadeff	6 ft 9 in (2.06 m)	220 lb (100 kg)	Fr	Villanova College	Brisbane, Australia
F	20	Zoar Nedd (W)	6 ft 6 in (1.98 m)	210 lb (95 kg)	So	Kapolei HS	Kapolei, Hawaii
G	22	Ryan Rapp	6 ft 5 in (1.96 m)	195 lb (88 kg)	Jr	Mazenod College; Washington State	Melbourne, Australia
C	23	Mor Seck	7 ft 1 in (2.16 m)	230 lb (104 kg)	Fr	Prolific Prep	Dakar, Senegal
G/F	32	Samuta Avea (C)	6 ft 6 in (1.98 m)	200 lb (91 kg)	Sr	Kahuku HS	Hauʻula, Hawaii
F	44	Kamaka Hepa (C)	6 ft 10 in (2.08 m)	215 lb (98 kg)	Sr	Jefferson HS (OR); Texas	Utqiagvik, Alaska
G	55	Juan Munoz (injured)	6 ft 0 in (1.83 m)	170 lb (77 kg)	GS	Panther Creek HS (NC); Longwood	Morrisville, North Carolina

Head coach

- Eran Ganot (Swarthmore)

Assistant coach(es)

- John Montgomery (Loyola Marymount)
  Associate head coach
- Brad Davidson (Sydney)
- Rob Jones (Saint Mary's)

Support staff

- Dominic Drury (Saint Mary's)
  Director of Basketball Operations
- Johnny Trueblood (Nebraska)
  Director of player development
- Alex Yano (Washington State)
  Graduate Assistant
- Jerome Desrosiers (Princeton)
  Graduate Assistant

Strength and conditioning coach(es)

- Tanner Hull (Missouri)

Athletic trainer(s)

- Lawrence Lam (UNLV)

Legend

- (C) Team captain
- (S) Suspended
- (I) Ineligible
- (W) Walk-on
- Injured
- Current redshirt

Roster

== Schedule ==
Date time, TV	Rank^{#}	Opponent^{#}	Result	Record	Site (attendance) city, state
Regular season
November 11, 2022*; 7:00 p.m., Spectrum Sports		Mississippi Valley State; Outrigger Rainbow Classic	W 72–54	1–0	Stan Sheriff Center (5,067); Honolulu, HI
November 13, 2022*; 5:00 p.m., Spectrum Sports		Eastern Washington; Outrigger Rainbow Classic	W 71–51	2–0	Stan Sheriff Center (4,450); Honolulu, HI
November 14, 2022*; 7:00 p.m., Spectrum Sports		Yale; Outrigger Rainbow Classic Championship Game	L 59–62 ^{OT}	2–1	Stan Sheriff Center (4,421); Honolulu, HI
November 19, 2022*; 12:00 p.m.		vs. Hawaii Pacific	W 79–55	3–1	Cannon Activities Center (423); Laie, HI
November 25, 2022*; 3:30 p.m., Spectrum Sports		vs. Sacramento State; North Shore Classic	W 74–61	4–1	Cannon Activities Center (1,225); Laie, HI
November 26, 2022*; 7:00 p.m., Spectrum Sports		vs. Texas State; North Shore Classic Championship Game	W 72–65	5–1	Cannon Activities Center (3,428); Laie, HI
November 30, 2022*; 7:00 p.m., Spectrum Sports		Texas A&M–Commerce	L 51–53	5–2	Stan Sheriff Center (3,948); Honolulu, HI
December 7, 2022*; 5:00 p.m., YouTube		at UNLV	L 62–77	5–3	Dollar Loan Center (4,207); Henderson, NV
December 11, 2022*; 5:00 p.m., Spectrum Sports		Saint Francis (PA)	W 90–66	6–3	Stan Sheriff Center (4,036); Honolulu, HI
December 22, 2022*; 6:00 p.m., ESPN2		Pepperdine; Diamond Head Classic Quarterfinals	W 76–70	7–3	Stan Sheriff Center (5,087); Honolulu, HI
December 23, 2022*; 7:30 p.m., ESPN2		Washington State; Diamond Head Classic Semifinals	W 62–51	8–3	Stan Sheriff Center (4,683); Honolulu, HI
December 25, 2022*; 3:30 p.m., ESPN2		SMU; Diamond Head Classic Championship Game	W 58–57	9–3	Stan Sheriff Center (5,279); Honolulu, HI
Big West regular season
December 29, 2022; 7:00 p.m., Spectrum Sports		UC Davis	W 74–66	10–3 (1–0)	Stan Sheriff Center (5,256); Honolulu, HI
December 31, 2022; 5:00 p.m., Spectrum Sports		Cal Poly	W 57–48	11–3 (2–0)	Stan Sheriff Center (4,260); Honolulu, HI
January 5, 2023; 5:00 p.m., ESPN+		at UC San Diego	W 62–49	12–3 (3–0)	LionTree Arena (976); La Jolla, CA
January 7, 2023; 4:00 p.m., ESPN+		at Cal State Fullerton	L 72–79 ^{OT}	12–4 (3–1)	Titan Gym (823); Fullerton, CA
January 14, 2023; 7:00 p.m., Spectrum Sports		Long Beach State	W 79–70	13–4 (4–1)	Stan Sheriff Center (5,801); Honolulu, HI
January 16, 2023; 5:00 p.m., Spectrum Sports		Cal State Northridge	W 58–51	14–4 (5–1)	Stan Sheriff Center (4,329); Honolulu, HI
January 19, 2023; 5:00 p.m., ESPN+		at UC Irvine	L 68–76	14–5 (5–2)	Bren Events Center (2,223); Irvine, CA
January 21, 2023; 11:00 a.m., Spectrum SportsNet		at UC Riverside	W 67–63	15–5 (6–2)	SRC Arena (722); Riverside, CA
January 26, 2023; 7:00 p.m., Spectrum Sports		UC Santa Barbara	L 64–65	15–6 (6–3)	Stan Sheriff Center (5,178); Honolulu, HI
January 28, 2023; 7:00 p.m., Spectrum Sports		Cal State Bakersfield	W 72–69	16–6 (7–3)	Stan Sheriff Center (5,729); Honolulu, HI
February 2, 2023; 4:00 p.m., ESPN+		at UC Davis	L 63–75	16–7 (7–4)	University Credit Union Center (1,961); Davis, CA
February 4, 2023; 5:00 p.m., ESPN+		at Cal Poly	W 69–56	17–7 (8–4)	Mott Athletics Center (2,412); San Luis Obispo, CA
February 9, 2023; 7:00 p.m., Spectrum Sports		UC San Diego	W 69–62	18–7 (9–4)	Stan Sheriff Center (4,529); Honolulu, HI
February 11, 2023; 7:00 p.m., Spectrum Sports		Cal State Fullerton	L 51–52	18–8 (9–5)	Stan Sheriff Center (5,217); Honolulu, HI
February 18, 2023; 2:00 p.m., ESPN+		at Long Beach State	W 70–67	19–8 (10–5)	Walter Pyramid (1,715); Long Beach, CA
February 20, 2023; 5:00 p.m., ESPN+		at Cal State Bakersfield	W 61–50	20–8 (11–5)	Icardo Center (976); Bakersfield, CA
February 23, 2023; 7:00 p.m., Spectrum Sports		UC Riverside	L 52–54	20–9 (11–6)	Stan Sheriff Center (4,957); Honolulu, HI
February 25, 2023; 5:00 p.m., ESPN2		UC Irvine	W 72–67	21–9 (12–6)	Stan Sheriff Center (10,300); Honolulu, HI
March 2, 2023; 5:00 p.m., ESPN+		at Cal State Northridge	W 81–55	22–9 (13–6)	Premier America Credit Union Arena (535); Northridge, CA
March 4, 2023; 4:00 p.m., ESPNU		at UC Santa Barbara	L 61–81	22–10 (13–7)	The Thunderdome (4,123); Santa Barbara, CA
Big West tournament
March 9, 2023; 12:30 p.m., ESPN+	(5)	vs. (4) Cal State Fullerton; Quarterfinals	L 60–62 ^{OT}	22–11	Dollar Loan Center (1,410); Henderson, NV
*Non-conference game. ^{#}Rankings from AP Poll. (#) Tournament seedings in parentheses. All times are in Hawaii–Aleutian Time. Source:
