= Jamaica Classic (basketball) =

American college basketball tournament in Jamaica

- Logo of the Jamaica Classic
- Sport: College basketball
- Founded: 2017
- Founder: Van Wagner Sports
- First season: 2017
- Folded: 2022
- No. of teams: 8 to 14
- Country: Jamaica
- Venues: Montego Bay Convention Centre; Montego Bay, Jamaica
- Broadcaster: CBS Sports Network
- Sponsor: Jersey Mike's Subs
- Website: Official site of the Jamaica Classic

The Jamaica Classic (branded as the Jersey Mike's Jamaica Classic) was an early-season college basketball tournament that took place in November of each year at the Montego Bay Convention Centre in Montego Bay, Jamaica, from 2017 through 2019 and in 2022. Each year, Jamaica Classic participants played games at campus sites in the United States, some before and some after the Montego Bay games. At Montego Bay, those which hosted the campus-site games played in the "Montego Bay Division" of the Classic, while those which visited the hosts for campus-site games played separately in the "Rose Hall Division." A separate championship was awarded for each division, and a most valuable player was selected in each division.

Games played at the Montego Bay Convention Centre were televised on the CBS Sports Network.

== History ==
The tournament debuted in 2017 with a 14-team field taking part in campus-site games. Seven of the 14 teams traveled to Montego Bay, where the Montego Bay Division played in a four-team showcase format, with predetermined match-ups scheduled as two doubleheaders. The Rose Hall Division had only three teams, which each played each other once in a three-day round-robin format. This resulted in a tripleheader on the first day at Montego Bay, a lone Rose Hall Division game on the second day, and another tripleheader on the third day.

In 2018, eight teams participated. All traveled to Montego Bay, where each division played in a four-team showcase format, with predetermined match-ups scheduled as two doubleheaders over two days. This resulted in two days of competition with four games on each day (one doubleheader for each division), separated by an off day.

In 2019, ten teams took part in campus-site games, eight of them NCAA Division I teams. The eight Division I teams traveled to Montego Bay, where play took place using the same format as in 2018.

The 2020 edition of the tournament was canceled because of the COVID-19 pandemic, which prompted the National Collegiate Athletic Association (NCAA) to move the first contest date of college basketball for the 2020–2021 season to November 25, 2020. With the pandemic still raging in 2021, the 2021 tournament also was cancelled, and the competition for that year shifted to a temporary tournament, the Jersey Mike's Classic, in St. Petersburg, Florida.

The Jamaica Classic resumed competition in 2022 and introduced bracketed tournament play for the first time, with separate brackets for each division. As in 2018 and 2019, four games — two from each division — were played on each of two days, resulting in four games on each of the two days with an off-day in between. The 2022 Classic also reduced the number of campus-site games to four. It was the last Jamaica Classic.

== Champions ==
=== Montego Bay Division ===
- 2022 — Loyola Marymount
- 2021 — No tournament
- 2020 — No tournament
- 2019 — Utah State
- 2018 — Loyola Marymount
- 2017 — Florida State

=== Rose Hall Division ===
- 2022 — Queens
- 2021 — No tournament
- 2020 — No tournament
- 2019 — Eastern Michigan
- 2018 — Campbell
- 2017 — Hartford

== Most Valuable Players ==
=== Montego Bay Division ===
- 2022 — Chance Stephens, Loyola Marymount
- 2021 — No tournament
- 2020 — No Tournament
- 2019 — Justin Bean, Utah State
- 2018 — James Batemon III, Loyola Marymount
- 2017 — M. J. Walker, Florida State

=== Rose Hall Division ===
- 2022 — Jay'Den Turner, Queens
- 2021 — No tournament
- 2020 — No tournament
- 2019 — Noah Morgan, Eastern Michigan
- 2018 — Chris Clemens, Campbell
- 2017 — J. R. Lynch, Hartford

== Tournaments ==
=== 2022 ===
After a three-year hiatus, the Jamaica Classic resumed play in 2022, featuring a new format. In addition to campus games, the 2022 event included a tournament featuring two brackets, the first time the Jamaica Classic included bracketed tournament play.

Eight teams took part in the Jamaica Classic. Each participant played a game at a campus site in the United States, either before or after the tournament at Montego Bay. Play at Montego Bay was divided into the Montego Bay Division, a bracketed competition including the four teams which had hosted a campus-site game, and the Rose Hall Division, a separate bracketed competition made up of the four teams which played as the visitor in a campus-site game. The tournament took place over the course of two days, with two Montego Bay Division and two Rose Hall Division games each day and an off day in between. Championship and consolation games in each bracket determined the results in each division.

==== Participants ====
- Georgetown
- Green Bay
- La Salle
- Loyola Marymount
- Morgan State
- Queens
- Utah Valley
- Wake Forest

==== Campus games ====
November 12
Green Bay	58
Georgetown	92

November 15
Queens	60
La Salle	72

November 15
Utah Valley	65
Wake Forest	68 (OT)

November 23
Morgan State	80
Loyola Marymount	81 (OT)

==== Montego Bay Division ====
Semifinals
November 18
Wake Forest	75
La Salle	63
November 18
Georgetown	66
Loyola Marymount	84

Championship
November 20
Wake Forest	75
Loyola Marymount	77 (OT)
Consolation
November 20
La Salle	62
Georgetown	69

==== Rose Hall Division ====
Semifinals
November 18
Green Bay	65
Queens	81
November 18
Morgan State	73
Utah Valley	72

Championship
November 20
Queens	74
Morgan State	64
Consolation
November 20
Green Bay	56
Utah Valley	79

=== 2021 ===
The 2021 Jamaica Classic was cancelled due to the COVID-19 pandemic. Instead, a temporary tournament, the Jersey Mike's Classic, was held and played in the McArthur Center at Eckerd College in St. Petersburg, Florida. The Jamaica Classic competition was shifted to the Jersey Mike's Classic for the season, with Ball State, FIU, Green Bay, UMass, UNC Greensboro, and Weber State participating.

=== 2020 ===
The 2020 Jamaica Classic was cancelled due to the COVID-19 pandemic. Teams which committed to participate included UMass, Missouri State, UNC Greensboro, and Wake Forest.

=== 2019 ===
The 2019 Jamaica Classic had ten participants, eight of them NCAA Division I teams. All campus-site games took place before the Montego Bay tournament, with some teams playing in two campus-site games and others in only one. The eight Division I teams then traveled to Montego Bay, where play followed the format established in 2018 of a four-team showcase-style event in the Montego Bay Division made up of teams which strictly had hosted campus-site games, and a similar four-team showcase-style event in the Rose Hall Division, which consisted of the teams which played against the "host" teams as visitors at campus sites.

==== Participants ====
- Eastern Michigan
- LSU
- Michigan–Dearborn
- Nicholls
- North Carolina A&T
- North Texas
- Rhode Island
- St. Mary's (MD)
- Utah State
- UMBC

==== Campus Games ====
November 13
St. Mary's	57
UMBC	79

November 14
Michigan-Dearborn	59
Eastern Michigan	72

November 15
North Carolina A&T	54
Utah State	81

November 16
Nicholls State	65
LSU	75

November 16
Eastern Michigan	51
North Texas	56

November 19
Nicholls State	65
Rhode Island	70

November 19
UMBC	50
LSU	77

November 19
North Carolina A&T	60
North Texas	80

==== Montego Bay Division ====
November 22
LSU	78
Utah State	80

November 22
Rhode Island	60
North Texas	47

November 24
LSU	96
Rhode Island	83

November 24
North Texas	59
Utah State	68

==== Rose Hall Division ====
November 22
UMBC	45
Eastern Michigan	62

November 22
Nicholls State	54
North Carolina A&T	66

November 24
North Carolina A&T	54
Eastern Michigan	58

November 24
UMBC	72
Nicholls State	82

=== 2018 ===
The 2018 Jamaica Classic had eight participants. Each team played in two campus-site games, some played before and some after the Montego Bay event. Four teams played strictly as hosts in the campus-site games and the other four strictly as visitors.

All eight teams traveled to Montego Bay, where the four teams which hosted campus-site games made up the Montego Bay Division and the four which had played as visitors at campus sites made up the Rose Hall Division. Each division played in a two-day showcase-like format with predetermined match-ups on both days of competition. Two Montego Bay Division and two Rose Hall Division games took place on each day, with an off-day in between.

==== Participants ====
- Austin Peay
- Campbell
- Central Connecticut
- Florida A&M
- Georgetown
- Loyola Marymount
- Ohio
- South Florida

==== Campus games ====
November 10
Central Connecticut State	78
Georgetown	85

November 12
Austin Peay	70
South Florida	74 (OT)

November 12
Campbell	73
Ohio	81

November 21
Florida A&M	59
South Florida	69

November 21
Central Connecticut State	74
Loyola Marymount	76

November 24
Campbell	85
Georgetown	93

November 24
Austin Peay	82
Ohio	85 (OT)

November 24
Florida A&M	63
Loyola Marymount	71

==== Montego Bay Division ====
November 16
Loyola Marymount	65
Georgetown	62

November 16
South Florida	73
Ohio	46

November 18
Loyola Marymount	65
Ohio	56

November 18
South Florida	73
Georgetown	76(OT)

==== Rose Hall Division ====
November 16
Central Connecticut State	78
Austin Peay	80

November 16
Florida A&M	59
Campbell	66

November 18
Campbell	78
Austin Peay	72

November 18
Florida A&M	75
Central Connecticut State	89

=== 2017 ===
Fourteen teams — 10 NCAA Division I and four non-Division I teams — participated in the 2017 Jamaica Classic, all of them playing in campus-site games, some of which were held prior to and some after the Montego Bay events.

Seven of the Division I teams traveled to Montego Bay. Four of them which had hosted campus-site games formed the Montego Bay Division and played in a pair of doubleheaders at Montego Bay, while the other three, each of which had played as the visitor in a campus-site game against one of the "hosts," formed the Rose Hall Division and took part in a round-robin competition at Montego Bay in which each played the other two "visitors" once.

After Florida State withdrew from the 2017 Puerto Rico Tip-Off to play in the Jamaica Classic, the Classic's organizers chose the showcase doubleheader format rather than a bracketed tournament between the four "hosts" to prevent Florida State and Tulane — already scheduled to meet in the Heritage Insurance Classic on December 10 — from meeting in the Jamaica Classic as well in violation of NCAA scheduling rules.

==== Participants ====
- Colorado State
- Florida State
- Fordham
- Hartford
- LIU Brooklyn
- Miami (OH)
- Northwestern State
- The Citadel
- Tulane
- Winthrop
- Gordon College
- LeTourneau
- Oglethorpe
- Trinity Baptist

==== Campus Games ====
November 10
Miami (OH)	55
Fordham	54

November 10
LIU Brooklyn	96
Tulane	102

November 10
Oglethorpe	73
The Citadel	109

November 12
LeTourneau	99
Northwestern State	84

November 12
Gordon College	63
Hartford	80

November 13
LIU-Brooklyn	68
Fordham	81

November 14
Winthrop	76
Colorado State	80

November 21
Trinity Baptist	66
The Citadel	116

November 22
Miami (OH)	5980
Tulane	116

November 24
Northwestern State	60
Colorado State	72

November 24
The Citadel	78
Florida State	113

==== Montego Bay Division ====
November 17
Florida State	67
Fordham	43

November 17
Tulane	80
Colorado State	53

November 19
Florida State	90
Colorado State	73

November 19
Fordham	53
Tulane	65

==== Rose Hall Division ====
November 17
LIU Brooklyn	74
Miami (OH)	78

November 18
Hartford	84
LIU Brooklyn	86

November 19
Miami (OH)	58
Hartford	68
