= 2022–23 UC Santa Barbara Gauchos men's basketball team =

American college basketball season

2022–23 UC Santa Barbara Gauchos men's basketball

Big West co-regular season and tournament champions

NCAA tournament, First Round
- Conference: Big West Conference
- Record: 27–8 (15–5 Big West)
- Head coach: Joe Pasternack (6th season)
- Assistant coaches: Larry Lewis; Ben Tucker; Derek Glasser
- Home arena: The Thunderdome (Capacity: 5,000)

2022–23 Big West men's basketball standings
	Conf.				Overall
Team	W		L	PCT	W		L	PCT
UC Santa Barbara †	15	–	5	.750	27	–	8	.771
UC Irvine	15	–	5	.750	23	–	12	.657
UC Riverside	14	–	6	.700	22	–	12	.647
Cal State Fullerton	12	–	6	.667	20	–	13	.606
Hawai'i	13	–	7	.650	22	–	11	.667
UC Davis	11	–	8	.579	18	–	14	.563
Long Beach State	11	–	9	.550	17	–	16	.515
Cal State Bakersfield	6	–	14	.300	11	–	22	.333
UC San Diego*	5	–	13	.278	10	–	20	.333
Cal State Northridge	4	–	16	.200	7	–	25	.219
Cal Poly	1	–	18	.053	8	–	25	.242
† 2023 Big West tournament winner * ineligible for the 2023 NCAA tournament due to transition period

The 2022–23 UC Santa Barbara Gauchos men's basketball team represented the University of California, Santa Barbara in the 2022–23 NCAA Division I men's basketball season. The Gauchos, led by sixth-year head coach Joe Pasternack, played their home games at The Thunderdome in Santa Barbara, California as members of the Big West Conference. They finished the season 27–7, 15–5 in Big West Play to tie as regular season champions. They defeated Cal Poly, UC Riverside, and Cal State Fullerton to be champions of the Big West tournament. They received the Big West’s automatic bid to the NCAA tournament where they lost in the first round to Baylor.

== Previous season ==
The Gauchos finished the 2021–22 season 17–11, 8–5 in Big West play to finish in fifth place. They defeated UC Irvine in the quarterfinals of the Big West tournament before losing to Long Beach State in the semifinals.

== Roster ==
2022–23 UC Santa Barbara Gauchos men's basketball team
Players
Coaches

Pos.	#	Name	Height	Weight	Year	Previous school	Hometown
F	00	Koat Keat Tong	6 ft 9 in (2.06 m)	215 lb (98 kg)	Fr	Crean Lutheran HS	Bentiu, South Sudan
G	1	Josh Pierre-Louis	6 ft 4 in (1.93 m)	190 lb (86 kg)	Sr	Temple	Plainfield, NJ
F	2	Andre Kelly	6 ft 9 in (2.06 m)	255 lb (116 kg)	Sr	Lincoln High School	Stockton, CA
G	3	Ajare Sanni	6 ft 3 in (1.91 m)	180 lb (82 kg)	Sr	Pacific	Houston, TX
G	4	Cole Anderson	6 ft 4 in (1.93 m)	185 lb (84 kg)	So	Clovis West HS	Fresno, CA
F	5	Miles Norris	6 ft 10 in (2.08 m)	220 lb (100 kg)	Sr	Brewster Academy	San Diego, CA
G	10	Calvin Wishart	6 ft 2 in (1.88 m)	185 lb (84 kg)	RS Sr	Georgia Southern	Delano, MN
G	11	Zach Harvey	6 ft 6 in (1.98 m)	190 lb (86 kg)	RS Sr	Cincinnati	Overland Park, KS
F	12	Evans Kipruto	6 ft 8 in (2.03 m)	250 lb (113 kg)	Jr	Barton Community College	Nairobi, Kenya
G	13	Ajay Mitchell	6 ft 5 in (1.96 m)	190 lb (86 kg)	So	Limburg United	Ans, Belgium
F	14	Jakov Kukic	6 ft 10 in (2.08 m)	225 lb (102 kg)	RS Jr	La Lumiere School	Split, Croatia
F	23	Ariel Bland	6 ft 7 in (2.01 m)	215 lb (98 kg)	So	Golden State Prep	Eden Prairie, MN
G	32	Matija Belic	6 ft 7 in (2.01 m)	205 lb (93 kg)	Fr	KK Mladost Zemun	Belgrade, Serbia
F	40	David Pickles	6 ft 10 in (2.08 m)	235 lb (107 kg)	So	Mercer Island HS	Seattle, WA
G	50	Gage Gomez	6 ft 3 in (1.91 m)	190 lb (86 kg)	Jr	Arroyo Grande HS	Arroyo Grande, CA
G	51	Henry Hartwell	6 ft 5 in (1.96 m)	190 lb (86 kg)	RS Fr	El Camino HS	Oceanside, CA
G	53	Max Sheldon	5 ft 11 in (1.8 m)	180 lb (82 kg)	So	San Marcos HS	Santa Barbara, CA

Head coach

- Joe Pasternack (Indiana)

Assistant coach(es)

- Larry Lewis (Morehouse)
- Ben Tucker (Arizona)
- Derek Glasser (Arizona State)

Legend

- (C) Team captain
- (S) Suspended
- (I) Ineligible
- (W) Walk-on
- Injured
- Current redshirt

Roster
Last update: November 19, 2022

== Schedule and results ==
Date time, TV	Rank^{#}	Opponent^{#}	Result	Record	High points	High rebounds	High assists	Site (attendance) city, state
Non-conference regular season
November 7, 2022*; 7:00 p.m., ESPN+		San Francisco State	W 75–59	1–0	25 – Anderson	14 – Kelly	10 – Mitchell	The Thunderdome; Santa Barbara, CA
November 11, 2022*; 2:00 p.m., FloHoops		vs. Fresno State	W 61–54	2–0	16 – Kelly	15 – Kelly	4 – Kelly	Kaiser Permanente Arena (121); Santa Cruz, CA
November 18, 2022*; 5:00 p.m., ESPN+		at Northern Arizona	L 54–63	2–1	18 – Mitchell	7 – Kelly	2 – Mitchell	Findlay Toyota Court (463); Flagstaff, AZ
November 21, 2022*; 6:00 p.m., ESPN+		Hampton; Santa Barbara Beach Classic	W 79–66	3–1	17 – Mitchell	16 – Norris	8 – Mitchell	The Thunderdome; Santa Barbara, CA
November 23, 2022*; 7:00 p.m., ESPN+		North Alabama; Santa Barbara Beach Classic	W 89–71	4–1	17 – Mitchell	7 – Kelly	7 – 2 Tied	The Thunderdome (1,327); Santa Barbara, CA
November 29, 2022*; 4:00 p.m., ESPN+		at Duquesne	L 61–72	4–2	15 – Pierre-Louis	9 – Pierre-Louis	5 – Norris	UPMC Cooper Fieldhouse (1,863); Pittsburgh, PA
December 3, 2022*; 2:00 p.m., ESPN+		Pacific	W 82–71	5–2	22 – Sanni	11 – Kelly	8 – Pierre-Louis	The Thunderdome (1,623); Santa Barbara, CA
December 10, 2022*; 5:00 p.m., WCC Network		at Pepperdine	W 67–64 ^{OT}	6–2	16 – Pierre-Louis	8 – Kelly	3 – Mitchell	Firestone Fieldhouse (651); Malibu, CA
December 12, 2022*; 7:00 p.m., ESPN+		San Diego Christian	W 81–68	7–2	15 – Norris	5 – Keat Tong	5 – Mitchell	The Thunderdome (457); Santa Barbara, CA
December 17, 2022*; 7:00 p.m., ESPN+		at Portland State	W 85–73	8–2	25 – Mitchell	10 – Norris	5 – Mitchell	Viking Pavilion (748); Portland, OR
December 21, 2022*; 3:00 p.m., ESPN+		vs. Appalachian State; Jerry Colangelo Classic	W 61–50	9–2	22 – Mitchell	10 – Norris	4 – Mitchell	Footprint Center; Phoenix, AZ
Big West regular season
December 29, 2022; 7:00 p.m., ESPNU		at Cal State Fullerton	W 66–58	10–2 (1–0)	24 – Mitchell	4 – Keat Tong	3 – Mitchell	Titan Gym (965); Fullerton, CA
December 31, 2022; 4:00 p.m., ESPN+		UC San Diego	W 82–61	11–2 (2–0)	23 – Mitchell	7 – Kelly	6 – Mitchell	The Thunderdome (1,063); Santa Barbara, CA
January 7, 2023; 7:00 p.m., SPSN		at Cal Poly; Rivalry	W 62–57	12–2 (3–0)	16 – Norris	6 – 3 Tied	5 – Mitchell	Mott Athletics Center (1,882); San Luis Obispo, CA
January 11, 2023; 7:00 p.m., ESPN+		at Cal State Bakersfield	W 60–48	13–2 (4–0)	14 – Norris	7 – Keat Tong	3 – Mitchell	Icardo Center (1,008); Bakersfield, CA
January 14, 2023; 7:00 p.m., ESPN+		UC Riverside	L 64–65	13–3 (4–1)	15 – Mitchell	6 – Kelly	4 – Mitchell	The Thunderdome (3,384); Santa Barbara, CA
January 16, 2023; 6:00 p.m., ESPN+		at UC Irvine	W 73–65	14–3 (5–1)	22 – Kelly	12 – Norris	7 – Mitchell	Bren Events Center (3,123); Irvine, CA
January 19, 2023; 7:00 p.m., ESPN+		CSUN	W 72–52	15–3 (6–1)	18 – Mitchell	11 – Keat Tong	6 – Tied	The Thunderdome (1,472); Santa Barbara, CA
January 21, 2023; 7:00 p.m., ESPN+		Cal State Bakersfield	W 76–58	16–3 (7–1)	24 – Norris	7 – Norris	4 – Mitchell	The Thunderdome (942); Santa Barbara, CA
January 26, 2023; 10:00 p.m., ESPN+		at Hawaii	W 65–64	17–3 (8–1)	24 – Mitchell	7 – Tied	3 – Mitchell	Stan Sheriff Center (5,178); Honolulu, HI
February 2, 2023; 7:00 p.m., ESPN+		Cal Poly; Rivalry	W 68–62	18–3 (9–1)	18 – Norris	6 – Kelly	8 – Mitchell	The Thunderdome (3,942); Santa Barbara, CA
February 4, 2022; 7:00 p.m., ESPN+		at CSUN	L 67–72	18–4 (9–2)	17 – Norris	11 – Kelly	3 – Tied	Premier America Credit Union Arena (522); Northridge, CA
February 9, 2023; 8:00 p.m., ESPNU		at Long Beach State	W 75–72	19–4 (10–2)	17 – Mitchell	10 – Kelly	10 – Mitchell	Walter Pyramid (2,836); Long Beach, CA
February 11, 2023; 7:00 p.m., ESPN+		UC Davis	W 84–74	20–4 (11–2)	24 – Mitchell	8 – Norris	8 – Pierre-Louis	The Thunderdome (2,341); Santa Barbara, CA
February 15, 2023; 7:00 p.m., ESPN+		UC Irvine	L 59–70	20–5 (11–3)	25 – Mitchell	8 – Norris	5 – Wishart	The Thunderdome (2,175); Santa Barbara, CA
February 18, 2023; 5:00 p.m., ESPN+		at UC Riverside	L 63–74	20–6 (11–4)	22 – Kelly	8 – Kelly	6 – Mitchell	SRC Arena (746); Riverside, CA
February 20, 2023; 7:00 p.m., SPSN		Cal State Fullerton	L 60–74	20–7 (11–5)	17 – Norris	9 – Norris	7 – Mitchell	The Thunderdome (1,972); Santa Barbara, CA
February 23, 2023; 7:00 p.m., ESPN+		Long Beach State	W 78–73	21–7 (12–5)	28 – Mitchell	7 – Norris	6 – Mitchell	The Thunderdome (1,502); Santa Barbara, CA
February 25, 2023; 7:00 p.m., ESPN+		at UC San Diego	W 87–71	22–7 (13–5)	25 – Norris	11 – Kelly	8 – Wishart	LionTree Arena (1,489); La Jolla, CA
March 2, 2023; 6:00 p.m., ESPN+		at UC Davis	W 89–86	23–7 (14–5)	20 – Mitchell	6 – Pierre-Louis	6 – Mitchell	University Credit Union Center (2,113); Davis, CA
March 4, 2023; 6:00 p.m., ESPNU		Hawaii	W 81–61	24–7 (15–5)	18 – Norris	10 – Tied	11 – Mitchell	The Thunderdome (4,123); Santa Barbara, CA
Big West tournament
March 9, 2023; 6:00 pm, ESPN+	(2)	vs. (10) Cal Poly; Quarterfinals	W 64–54	25–7	24 – Mitchell	8 – Kelly	5 – Mitchell	Dollar Loan Center; Henderson, NV
March 10, 2023; 8:30 pm, ESPNU	(2)	vs. (3) UC Riverside; Semifinals	W 92–87	26–7	28 – Mitchell	6 – Tied	7 – Mitchell	Dollar Loan Center (1,194); Henderson, NV
March 11, 2023; 6:30 pm, ESPN2	(2)	vs. (4) Cal State Fullerton; Championship	W 72–62	27–7	20 – Mitchell	10 – Kelly	4 – 2 tied	Dollar Loan Center (1,897); Henderson, NV
NCAA tournament
March 17, 2023*; 10:30 am, TNT	(14 S)	vs. (3 S) No. 11 Baylor; First Round	L 56–74	27–8	15 – Norris	7 – Kelly	4 – Mitchell	Ball Arena; Denver, CO
*Non-conference game. ^{#}Rankings from AP Poll. (#) Tournament seedings in parentheses. S=South. All times are in Pacific.
