= John Smith (basketball, born 1969) =

American basketball coach (born 1969)

Current position
- Title: Assistant coach
- Team: San Diego State Aztecs
- Conference: Mountain West

Biographical details
- Born: March 12, 1969 (age 57); Riverside, California, U.S.

Playing career
- 1987–1989: UNLV
- 1992–1994: Dominican

Coaching career (HC unless noted)
- 2000–2004: San Bernardino Valley
- 2004–2013: Riverside CC
- 2013–2019: Cal State Fullerton (assistant)
- 2019–2024: Cal Poly
- 2024–2025: Washington (SATTHC)
- 2025–present: San Diego State (women's assistant)

Head coaching record
- Overall: 30–117 (.204); 265–118 (.692) NJCAA

Accomplishments and honors

Championships
- CCCAA State Champion (2009), 4x Orange Empire Conference (2005,07,10-11), Foothills Conference (2003)

Awards
- 5x Orange Empire Coach of the Year (2005,07,10-11,13), Foothills Coach of the Year (2003)

John David Smith (born March 12, 1969) is an American college basketball coach who is an assistant coach for the San Diego State Aztecs women's basketball team. He previously served as the head coach of the Cal Poly Mustangs men's basketball team.

== Playing career ==
A standout at John W. North High School, Smith originally began his college basketball career at UNLV under Jerry Tarkanian, who coached Smith's father, Fred "Lucky" Smith, while he was the head coach at Riverside City College. Smith would finish his playing career at Dominican where he played for his brother Steve, and was a NAIA All-California honorable mention and all-conference selection. Smith graduated from Dominican in 1994 with a bachelor's degree in psychology.

== Coaching career ==
Smith's coaching career included stops at the College of Southern Idaho and Chaffey College as well as the high school ranks at his alma mater J.W. North, and Valley View High School as an assistant coach. In 2000, Smith was hired was the head coach and assistant athletic director at San Bernardino Valley College. He would guide the team to an 88–40 record in four seasons, including a Foothill Conference championship during the 2002–03 season. In 2004, Smith accepted the head coaching position at Riverside City College where he went 196–87 with four conference championships including the 2009 California State Championship, the school's first in 43 years since when Jerry Tarkanian was coaching.

Smith accepted the position of assistant coach at Cal State Fullerton under Dedrique Taylor in 2013. He would stay on staff for six seasons and was part of the Titans' Big West Conference tournament-winning squad and 2018 NCAA tournament appearance.

On March 28, 2019, Smith was named the head coach at Cal Poly, replacing Joe Callero.

== Personal life ==
Smith's son Jamal currently plays for Cal State Fullerton, while his daughter Kianna plays basketball at Louisville. His father "Lucky" also played college basketball at Utah State and Hawaii, and was a sixth round selection of the Milwaukee Bucks in the 1968 NBA draft.

== Head coaching record ==
Record table
Season	Team	Overall	Conference	Standing	Postseason
San Bernardino Valley College Wolverines (Foothills) (2000–2004)
2000-01	San Bernardino Valley College				
2001-02	San Bernardino Valley College				
2002-03	San Bernardino Valley College			1st	CCCAA State Tournament Semifinals
2003-04	San Bernardino Valley College				
San Bernardino Valley College:		88–40 (.688)			
Riverside City College Tigers (Orange Empire) (2004–2013)
2004-05	Riverside City College			1st	
2005-06	Riverside City College				
2006-07	Riverside City College			1st	
2007-08	Riverside City College				
2008-09	Riverside City College				CCCAA State Championship
2009-10	Riverside City College			1st	
2010-11	Riverside City College			1st	
2011-12	Riverside City College				
2012-13	Riverside City College	19-9	9-3		
Riverside City College:		196–87 (.693)			
Cal Poly Mustangs (Big West) (2019–2024)
2019–20	Cal Poly	7–23	4–12	9th	
2020–21	Cal Poly	4–20	1–15	10th	
2021–22	Cal Poly	7–21	2–12	T–9th	
2022–23	Cal Poly	8–25	1–17	11th	
2023–24	Cal Poly	4–28	0–20	11th	
Cal Poly:		30–117 (.204)	8–76 (.095)		
Total:		30–117 (.204)			
National champion Postseason invitational champion Conference regular season champion Conference regular season and conference tournament champion Division regular season champion Division regular season and conference tournament champion Conference tournament champion
