= 2022–23 Long Beach State Beach men's basketball team =

American college basketball season

2022–23 Long Beach State Beach men's basketball
- Conference: Big West Conference
- Record: 17–16 (11–9 Big West)
- Head coach: Dan Monson (16th season)
- Associate head coach: Myke Scholl
- Assistant coaches: Senque Carey; Allen Caveness
- Home arena: Walter Pyramid; Gold Mine (1 game) (Capacity: 4,200)

2022–23 Big West men's basketball standings
	Conf.				Overall
Team	W		L	PCT	W		L	PCT
UC Santa Barbara †	15	–	5	.750	27	–	8	.771
UC Irvine	15	–	5	.750	23	–	12	.657
UC Riverside	14	–	6	.700	22	–	12	.647
Cal State Fullerton	12	–	6	.667	20	–	13	.606
Hawai'i	13	–	7	.650	22	–	11	.667
UC Davis	11	–	8	.579	18	–	14	.563
Long Beach State	11	–	9	.550	17	–	16	.515
Cal State Bakersfield	6	–	14	.300	11	–	22	.333
UC San Diego*	5	–	13	.278	10	–	20	.333
Cal State Northridge	4	–	16	.200	7	–	25	.219
Cal Poly	1	–	18	.053	8	–	25	.242
† 2023 Big West tournament winner * ineligible for the 2023 NCAA tournament due to transition period

The 2022–23 Long Beach State Beach men's basketball team represented California State University, Long Beach in the 2022–23 NCAA Division I men's basketball season. The Beach were led by 16th-year head coach Dan Monson and played their home games at the Walter Pyramid in Long Beach, California as members of the Big West Conference.

The Beach finished the season 17–16, 11–9 in Big West play, to finish in seventh place. In the Big West tournament, they were upset by last-placed Cal Poly in the first round.

== Previous season ==
The Beach finished the 2021–22 season 20–12, 12–3 in Big West play, to win the regular-season championship, the school's first since 2013 and fourth overall under Monson. They defeated Cal State Bakersfield and UC Santa Barbara to advance to the championship game of the Big West tournament where they lost to Cal State Fullerton. As a regular-season champion that did not win its conference tournament, they received an automatic bid to the National Invitation Tournament, losing in the first round to BYU.

== Roster ==
2022–23 Long Beach State Beach men's basketball team
Players
Coaches

Pos.	#	Name	Height	Weight	Year	Previous school	Hometown
G	0	Marcus Tsohonis	6 ft 3 in (1.91 m)	190 lb (86 kg)	Jr	VCU	Portland, OR
F	1	Amari Stroud	6 ft 10 in (2.08 m)	210 lb (95 kg)	Jr	Allan Hancock College	Fresno, CA
G	3	Maddox Monson	6 ft 2 in (1.88 m)	180 lb (82 kg)	Fr	Los Alamitos HS	Los Alamitos, CA
G	5	Jason Jr. Hart	6 ft 2 in (1.88 m)	175 lb (79 kg)	Fr	St. Bernard HS	Granada Hills, CA
F	10	AJ George	6 ft 6 in (1.98 m)	190 lb (86 kg)	RS Fr	Hoover HS	Fresno, CA
G	11	Joel Murray	6 ft 0 in (1.83 m)	170 lb (77 kg)	Sr	West Texas A&M	Rowlett, TX
G	12	Jadon Jones	6 ft 5 in (1.96 m)	185 lb (84 kg)	So	St. Anthony HS	Long Beach, CA
C	13	Chayce Polynice	6 ft 11 in (2.11 m)	230 lb (104 kg)	Jr	Southern Idaho	Van Nuys, CA
G	21	Tone Hunter	6 ft 1 in (1.85 m)	160 lb (73 kg)	So	Garden City CC	Las Vegas, NV
F	23	Lassina Traoré	6 ft 10 in (2.08 m)	230 lb (104 kg)	So	Saint Louis	Abidjan, Côte d'Ivoire
G	25	Aboubacar Traoré	6 ft 5 in (1.96 m)	195 lb (88 kg)	So	LaBASE Academy	Abidjan, Côte d'Ivoire
F	31	Tobias Rotegård	6 ft 7 in (2.01 m)	200 lb (91 kg)	So	UAB	Kongsberg, Norway
F	34	Matt Fegurgur	6 ft 10 in (2.08 m)	220 lb (100 kg)	So	CCSF	Sinajana, Guam
F	35	Shaumba Nyogi	6 ft 9 in (2.06 m)	200 lb (91 kg)	Fr	Sunrise Christian Academy	Kinshasa, DR Congo
C	40	Jeffrey Yan	6 ft 9 in (2.06 m)	260 lb (118 kg)	Jr	Capistrano Valley Christian School	Shanghai, China

Head coach

- Dan Monson (Idaho)

Assistant coach(es)

- Myke Scholl (Loyola Marymount)
- Senque Carey (New Mexico)
- Allen Caveness (Saint Mary's)

Legend

- (C) Team captain
- (S) Suspended
- (I) Ineligible
- (W) Walk-on
- Injured
- Current redshirt

Roster
Last update: November 20, 2022

== Schedule and results ==
Date time, TV	Rank^{#}	Opponent^{#}	Result	Record	High points	High rebounds	High assists	Site (attendance) city, state
Exhibition
October 21, 2022; 7:00 p.m.		Biola	W 73–71		15 – A. Traoré	10 – L. Traoré	4 – Tone	Walter Pyramid (1,192); Long Beach, CA
Non-conference regular season
November 7, 2022*; 7:00 p.m., ESPN+		at California Baptist	W 79–64	1–0	13 – L. Traoré	12 – L. Traoré	6 – Hunter	CBU Events Center (4,466); Riverside, CA
November 11, 2022*; 8:00 p.m., P12N		at No. 8 UCLA	L 69–93	1–1	14 – L. Traoré	7 – L. Traoré	7 – Murray	Pauley Pavilion (9,811); Los Angeles, CA
November 13, 2022*; 4:00 p.m., ESPN+		Montana State	L 57–70	1–2	21 – Murray	11 – A. Traoré	2 – Murray	Walter Pyramid (2,334); Long Beach, CA
November 19, 2022*; 4:00 p.m., ESPN+		Saint Katherine	W 84–55	2–2	20 – Tsohonis	10 – A. Traoré	5 – Murray	Walter Pyramid (880); Long Beach, CA
November 25, 2022*; 5:00 p.m., FloSports		vs. Oakland; Nassau Championship first round	W 78–70	3–2	17 – Murray	12 – L. Traoré	7 – Hunter	Baha Mar Convention Center; Nassau, Bahamas
November 26, 2022*; 5:00 p.m., FloSports		vs. North Texas; Nassau Championship semifinals	L 48–67	3–3	11 – Jones	9 – A. Traoré	2 – 2 tied	Baha Mar Convention Center (334); Nassau, Bahamas
November 27, 2022*; 2:30 p.m., FloSports		vs. Vermont; Nassau Championship 3rd-place game	W 78–58	4–3	23 – Tsohonis	11 – L. Traoré	7 – Murray	Baha Mar Convention Center (278); Nassau, Bahamas
December 3, 2022*; 1:00 p.m., ESPN+		at Utah Valley	L 78–88	4–4	16 – Rotegaard	16 – L. Traoré	5 – Hunter	UCCU Center (1,389); Orem, UT
December 10, 2022*; 3:30 p.m., ESPN+		at Sacramento State	L 74–76	4–5	21 – Murray	6 – Murray	3 – 2 tied	The Hornets Nest (710); Sacramento, CA
December 14, 2022*; 8:00 p.m.		at USC	L 78–88	4–6	17 – Tsohonis	16 – A. Traoré	5 – Hunter	Galen Center (1,835); Los Angeles, CA
December 19, 2022*; 7:00 p.m., ESPN+		Life Pacific	W 97–52	5–6	18 – L. Traoré	15 – A. Traoré	8 – Hunter	Walter Pyramid (929); Long Beach, CA
December 21, 2022*; 7:00 p.m., ESPN		Idaho	W 82–75	6–6	21 – Murray	14 – L. Traoré	5 – Hunter	Walter Pyramid (1,114); Long Beach, CA
Big West regular season
December 29, 2022; 7:00 p.m., ESPN+		UC San Diego	L 83–85 ^{OT}	6–7 (0–1)	22 – J. Murray	12 – A. Traoré	6 – M. Tsohonis	Walter Pyramid (1,426); Long Beach, CA
December 31, 2022; 3:00 p.m., ESPN+		at UC Riverside	L 72–73	6–8 (0–2)	20 – J. Murray	13 – L. Traoré	2 – 4 tied	Walter Pyramid (1,143); Long Beach, CA
January 5, 2023; 7:00 p.m., ESPN+		at Cal State Northridge	W 84–74	7–8 (1–2)	20 – J. Murray	16 – L. Traoré	7 – J. Murray	Premier America Credit Union Arena (348); Northridge, CA
January 7, 2023; 6:00 p.m., ESPN+		at UC Irvine	L 70–87	7–9 (1–3)	22 – L. Traoré	13 – L. Traoré	5 – A. Traoré	Bren Events Center (2,741); Irvine, CA
January 12, 2023; 7:00 p.m., ESPN+		Cal Poly	W 77–58	8–9 (2–3)	15 – George	8 – L. Traoré	5 – A. Traoré	Walter Pyramid (1,213); Long Beach, CA
January 14, 2023; 8:59 p.m.		at Hawaii	L 70–79	8–10 (2–4)	18 – Hunter	11 – A. Traoré	2 – Jones	Stan Sheriff Center (5,801); Honolulu, HI
January 19, 2023; 7:00 p.m., ESPN+		Cal State Fullerton	W 72–67	9–10 (3–4)	17 – Tsohonis	16 – L. Traoré	5 – A. Traoré	Walter Pyramid (2,354); Long Beach, CA
January 21, 2023; 7:00 p.m., ESPN+		at UC San Diego	W 112–110 ^{3OT}	10–10 (4–4)	46 – Tsohonis	19 – 2 tied	5 – 2 tied	RIMAC Arena (1,039); San Diego, CA
January 26, 2023; 7:00 p.m., ESPN+		at Cal Poly	W 70–52	11–10 (5–4)	19 – L. Traoré	15 – L. Traoré	4 – A. Traoré	Mott Athletics Center (1,928); San Luis Obispo, CA
January 28, 2023; 1:00 p.m., ESPN+		UC Davis	W 75–72	12–10 (6–4)	21 – Tsohonis	15 – L. Traoré	4 – 2 tied	Walter Pyramid (1,549); Long Beach, CA
February 2, 2023; 7:00 p.m.		at Cal State Fullerton	W 70–67	13–10 (7–4)	21 – Tsohonis	17 – L. Traoré	4 – Hunter	Titan Gym (2,445); Fullerton, CA
February 4, 2023; 4:00 p.m., ESPN+		UC Irvine	W 93–88	14–10 (8–4)	28 – Tsohonis	20 – L. Traoré	5 – Tsohonis	Walter Pyramid (2,361); Long Beach, CA
February 9, 2023; 8:00 p.m., ESPNU		UC Santa Barbara	L 72–75	14–11 (8–5)	18 – A. Traoré	10 – A. Traoré	6 – A. Traoré	Walter Pyramid (2,836); Long Beach, CA
February 11, 2023; 7:00 p.m., ESPN+		at Cal State Bakersfield	W 79–69	15–11 (9–5)	18 – Jones	6 – 3 tied	4 – 2 tied	Icardo Center (1,153); Bakersfield, CA
February 15, 2023; 7:00 p.m., ESPN+		at UC Riverside	L 76–88	15–12 (9–6)	26 – Tsohonis	7 – A. Traoré	3 – 2 tied	SRC Arena (1,274); Riverside, CA
February 18, 2023; ESPN+, 4:00 p.m.		Hawaii	L 67–70	15–13 (9–7)	20 – George	6 – 2 tied	4 – A. Traoré	Walter Pyramid (1,715); Long Beach, CA
February 23, 2023; 7:00 p.m.		at UC Santa Barbara	L 73–78	15–14 (9–8)	17 – L. Traoré	11 – L. Traoré	7 – A. Traoré	The Thunderdome (1,502); Santa Barbara, CA
February 25, 2023; 4:00 p.m., ESPN+		Cal State Northridge	W 71–64	16–14 (10–8)	18 – L. Traoré	12 – A. Traoré	8 – A. Traoré	Gold Mine (1,597); Long Beach, CA
March 2, 2023; 7:00 p.m., ESPN+		Cal State Bakersfield	W 77–61	17–14 (11–8)	20 – L. Traoré	12 – A. Traoré	4 – Hunter	Walter Pyramid (1,480); Long Beach, CA
March 4, 2023; 1:00 p.m., ESPN+		at UC Davis	L 92–93 ^{2OT}	17–15 (11–9)	22 – L. Traoré	20 – L. Traoré	7 – A. Traoré	University Credit Union Center (2,217); Davis, CA
Big West tournament
March 7, 2023; 8:30 p.m., ESPN+	(7)	vs. (10) Cal Poly; First round	L 68–88	17–16	14 – George	4 – L. Traoré	3 – L. Traoré	Dollar Loan Center; Henderson, NV
*Non-conference game. ^{#}Rankings from AP poll. (#) Tournament seedings in parentheses. All times are in Pacific.
