= 2022–23 UC Davis Aggies men's basketball team =

American college basketball season

2022–23 UC Davis Aggies men's basketball
- Conference: Big West Conference
- Record: 18–14 (11–8 Big West)
- Head coach: Jim Les (12th season)
- Associate head coach: Kevin Nosek
- Assistant coaches: Kyle Vogt; Jonathan Metzger-Jones
- Home arena: University Credit Union Center

2022–23 Big West men's basketball standings
| | Conf. | | | | Overall |
| Team | W | | L | PCT | W | | L | PCT |
|---|---|---|---|---|---|---|---|---|
| UC Santa Barbara † | 15 | – | 5 | .750 | 27 | – | 8 | .771 |
| UC Irvine | 15 | – | 5 | .750 | 23 | – | 12 | .657 |
| UC Riverside | 14 | – | 6 | .700 | 22 | – | 12 | .647 |
| Cal State Fullerton | 12 | – | 6 | .667 | 20 | – | 13 | .606 |
| Hawai'i | 13 | – | 7 | .650 | 22 | – | 11 | .667 |
| UC Davis | 11 | – | 8 | .579 | 18 | – | 14 | .563 |
| Long Beach State | 11 | – | 9 | .550 | 17 | – | 16 | .515 |
| Cal State Bakersfield | 6 | – | 14 | .300 | 11 | – | 22 | .333 |
| UC San Diego* | 5 | – | 13 | .278 | 10 | – | 20 | .333 |
| Cal State Northridge | 4 | – | 16 | .200 | 7 | – | 25 | .219 |
| Cal Poly | 1 | – | 18 | .053 | 8 | – | 25 | .242 |
† 2023 Big West tournament winner * ineligible for the 2023 NCAA tournament due to transition period

The 2022–23 UC Davis Aggies men's basketball team represented the University of California, Davis in the 2022–23 NCAA Division I men's basketball season. The Aggies, led by 12th-year head coach Jim Les, played their home games at the University Credit Union Center in Davis, California as members of the Big West Conference.

== Previous season ==
The Aggies finished the 2021–22 season 13–11, 5–6 in Big West play, to finish in seventh place. They defeated Cal Poly in the first round of the Big West tournament, before falling to eventual tournament champion Cal State Fullerton in the quarterfinals.

== Roster ==
2022–23 UC Davis Aggies men's basketball team
Players
Coaches

| Pos. | # | Name | Height | Weight | Year | Previous school | Hometown |
|---|---|---|---|---|---|---|---|
| G | 0 | Kane Milling | 6 ft 4 in (1.93 m) | 180 lb (82 kg) | Jr | Nevada | Nantes, France |
| F | 1 | Joaquin Strong | 6 ft 7 in (2.01 m) | — | Fr | Villa Park High School | Playa del Rey, CA |
| G | 2 | Ty Johnson | 6 ft 3 in (1.91 m) | 190 lb (86 kg) | So | Loyola–Chicago | Chicago, IL |
| F | 4 | Christian Anigwe | 6 ft 9 in (2.06 m) | 220 lb (100 kg) | Sr | San Jose State | Phoenix, AZ |
| G | 5 | Robby III Beasley | 6 ft 3 in (1.91 m) | 190 lb (86 kg) | So | Montana | San Ramon, CA |
| G | 10 | Leo DeBruhl | 6 ft 2 in (1.88 m) | 190 lb (86 kg) | So | Seattle Academy | Seattle, WA |
| F | 11 | Jac Mani | 6 ft 9 in (2.06 m) | — | Fr | Beverly Hills High School | Beverly Hills, CA |
| F | 12 | Sam Manu | 6 ft 7 in (2.01 m) | 210 lb (95 kg) | Jr | College of San Mateo | Taipei, Taiwan |
| F | 15 | DeAndre Henry | 6 ft 7 in (2.01 m) | 225 lb (102 kg) | Jr | Nevada | Phoenix, AZ |
| F | 20 | Niko Rocak | 6 ft 9 in (2.06 m) | 220 lb (100 kg) | So | UC Santa Barbara | Geneva, Switzerland |
| G | 22 | Sione Losé | 6 ft 4 in (1.93 m) | 170 lb (77 kg) | RS Fr | Capital Christian High School | Sacramento, CA |
| F | 23 | Patrick Lambey | 6 ft 5 in (1.96 m) | 190 lb (86 kg) | Jr | Yuba College | Granite Bay, CA |
| G | 24 | Ade Adebayo | 6 ft 5 in (1.96 m) | 205 lb (93 kg) | Jr | Barking Abbey School | London, England |
| G | 40 | Elijah Pepper | 6 ft 4 in (1.93 m) | 200 lb (91 kg) | Jr | Selah High School | Selah, WA |
| F | 55 | Francesco Borra | 6 ft 11 in (2.11 m) | 255 lb (116 kg) | So | JSerra Catholic High School | Moncalieri, Italy |

Head coach

- Jim Les (Bradley)

Assistant coach(es)

- Kevin Nosek (UC Davis)
- Kyle Vogt (Lakeland)
- Jonathan Metzger-Jones (Pacific)

Legend

- (C) Team captain
- (S) Suspended
- (I) Ineligible
- (W) Walk-on
- Injured
- Current redshirt

Roster
Last update: December 1, 2022

== Schedule and results ==
| Date time, TV | Rank^{#} | Opponent^{#} | Result | Record | Site (attendance) city, state |
Non-conference regular season
| November 7, 2022*; 8:00 p.m., P12N | | at California | W 75–65 | 1–0 | Haas Pavilion (3,128); Berkeley, CA |
| November 9, 2022*; 6:00 p.m., ESPN+ | | Cal Maritime | W 90–67 | 2–0 | University Credit Union Center (698); Davis, CA |
| November 12, 2022*; 7:00 p.m. | | at Loyola Marymount | L 75–85 | 2–1 | Gersten Pavilion; Los Angeles, CA |
| November 18, 2022*; 6:00 p.m., ESPN+ | | Arkansas State | W 75–60 | 3–1 | University Credit Union Center (1,125); Davis, CA |
| November 22, 2022*; 7:30 p.m. | | vs. Sacramento State; Causeway Cup | W 82–71 | 4–1 | Golden 1 Center (1,480); Sacramento, CA |
| November 26, 2022*; 2:00 p.m., ESPN+ | | at Milwaukee; Cream City Classic | L 85–87 | 4–2 | Klotsche Center (1,242); Milwaukee, WI |
| November 27, 2022*; 10:00 a.m. | | vs. Southeast Missouri State; Cream City Classic | W 73–71 | 5–2 | Klotsche Center; Milwaukee, WI |
| November 28, 2022*; 11:00 a.m. | | vs. Boston University; Cream City Classic | W 81–70 ^{OT} | 6–2 | Klotsche Center; Milwaukee, WI |
| December 1, 2022*; 6:00 p.m., ESPN+ | | Pacific | L 72–74 | 6–3 | University Credit Union Center (1,026); Davis, CA |
| December 13, 2022*; 6:00 p.m., ESPN+ | | Holy Names | W 107–55 | 7–3 | University Credit Union Center (691); Davis, CA |
| December 17, 2022*; 1:00 p.m., ESPN+ | | at Eastern Washington | L 68–79 | 7–4 | Reese Court (572); Cheney, WA |
| December 21, 2022*; 2:00 p.m., P12N | | at No. 13 UCLA | L 54–81 | 7–5 | Pauley Pavilion (7,421); Los Angeles, CA |
Big West regular season
| December 29, 2022; 9:00 p.m., ESPN+ | | at Hawaii | L 66–74 | 7–6 (0–1) | Stan Sheriff Center (5,256); Honolulu, HI |
| January 5, 2022; 6:00 p.m., ESPN+ | | UC Irvine | L 83–88 | 7–7 (0–2) | University Credit Union Center (749); Davis, CA |
| January 7, 2023; 5:00 p.m., ESPN+ | | Cal State Bakersfield | W 67–48 | 8–7 (1–2) | University Credit Union Center; Davis, CA |
| January 11, 2023; 7:00 p.m., ESPN+ | | at Cal State Northridge | W 62–54 | 9–7 (2–2) | Premier America Credit Union Arena (317); Northridge, CA |
| January 14, 2023; 2:00 p.m., ESPN+ | | Cal State Fullerton | W 83–79 | 10–7 (3–2) | University Credit Union Center (1,247); Davis, CA |
| January 16, 2023; 3:00 p.m., ESPN+ | | at UC San Diego | W 78–70 | 11–7 (4–2) | LionTree Arena (1,284); La Jolla, CA |
| January 19, 2023; 5:00 p.m., ESPN+ | | UC Riverside | L 72–74 | 11–8 (4–3) | University Credit Union Center (1,307); Davis, CA |
| January 21, 2023; 3:00 p.m., ESPN+ | | Cal Poly | W 65–63 | 12–8 (5–3) | University Credit Union Center (1,780); Davis, CA |
| January 26, 2023; 7:00 p.m., ESPN+ | | at Cal State Bakersfield | W 79–58 | 13–8 (6–3) | Icardo Center (1,593); Bakersfield, CA |
| January 28, 2023; 1:00 p.m., ESPN+ | | at Long Beach State | L 72–75 | 13–9 (6–4) | Walter Pyramid (1,549); Long Beach, CA |
| February 2, 2023; 6:00 p.m., ESPN+ | | Hawaii | W 75–63 | 14–9 (7–4) | University Credit Union Center (1,961); Davis, CA |
| February 9, 2023; 6:00 p.m., ESPN+ | | at UC Riverside | L 65–72 | 14–10 (7–5) | SRC Arena (629); Riverside, CA |
| February 11, 2023; 7:00 p.m., ESPN+ | | at UC Santa Barbara | L 74–84 | 14–11 (7–6) | The Thunderdome (2,341); Santa Barbara, CA |
| February 15, 2023; 6:00 p.m., ESPN+ | | Cal State Northridge | W 73–62 | 15–11 (8–6) | University Credit Union Center (875); Davis, CA |
| February 18, 2023; 1:00 p.m., ESPN+ | | at UC Irvine | L 76–78 | 15–12 (8–7) | Bren Events Center (1,812); Irvine, CA |
| February 20, 2023; 3:00 p.m., ESPN+ | | UC San Diego | W 76–66 | 16–12 (9–7) | University Credit Union Center (1,688); Davis, CA |
| February 23, 2023; 7:00 p.m., ESPN+ | | at Cal State Fullerton | Canceled | | Titan Gym; Fullerton, CA |
| February 25, 2023; 3:00 p.m., ESPN+ | | at Cal Poly | W 58–52 | 17–12 (10–7) | Mott Athletics Center (2,184); San Luis Obispo, CA |
| March 2, 2023; 6:00 p.m., ESPN+ | | UC Santa Barbara | L 86–89 | 17–13 (10–8) | University Credit Union Center (2,113); Davis, CA |
| March 4, 2023; 1:00 p.m., ESPN+ | | Long Beach State | W 93–92 ^{2OT} | 18–13 (11–8) | University Credit Union Center (2,217); Davis, CA |
Big West tournament
| March 9, 2023; 8:30 p.m., ESPN+ | (6) | vs. (3) UC Riverside; Quarterfinals | L 52–68 | 18–14 | Dollar Loan Center (902); Henderson, NV |
*Non-conference game. ^{#}Rankings from AP poll. (#) Tournament seedings in parentheses. All times are in Pacific.
