= 2022–23 UC Irvine Anteaters men's basketball team =

American college basketball season

2022–23 UC Irvine Anteaters men's basketball

Big West regular season co–champions Las Vegas Holiday Classic champions

NIT, First Round
- Conference: Big West Conference
- Record: 23–12 (15–5 Big West)
- Head coach: Russell Turner (13th season)
- Assistant coaches: Ryan Badrtalei (14th season); Michael Wilder (7th season); Alex Young (3rd season)
- Home arena: Bren Events Center (Capacity: 5,000)

2022–23 Big West men's basketball standings
	Conf.				Overall
Team	W		L	PCT	W		L	PCT
UC Santa Barbara †	15	–	5	.750	27	–	8	.771
UC Irvine	15	–	5	.750	23	–	12	.657
UC Riverside	14	–	6	.700	22	–	12	.647
Cal State Fullerton	12	–	6	.667	20	–	13	.606
Hawai'i	13	–	7	.650	22	–	11	.667
UC Davis	11	–	8	.579	18	–	14	.563
Long Beach State	11	–	9	.550	17	–	16	.515
Cal State Bakersfield	6	–	14	.300	11	–	22	.333
UC San Diego*	5	–	13	.278	10	–	20	.333
Cal State Northridge	4	–	16	.200	7	–	25	.219
Cal Poly	1	–	18	.053	8	–	25	.242
† 2023 Big West tournament winner * ineligible for the 2023 NCAA tournament due to transition period

The 2022–23 UC Irvine Anteaters men's basketball team represented the University of California, Irvine in the 2022–23 NCAA Division I men's basketball season. They played their home games at the Bren Events Center in Irvine, California as a member of the Big West Conference. The Anteaters were led by 13th-year head coach Russell Turner.

== Previous season ==
The Anteaters finished the 2021–22 season 15–10, 9–5 to finish in fourth place in Big West play. They lost to UC Santa Barbara in the quarterfinals of the Big West tournament. The team led the nation in three-point field goal defense, allowing opponents to shoot only 25.3%. They were 10th in the nation in overall field goal defense allowing opponents to shoot 38.4%

== Roster ==
2022–23 UC Irvine Anteaters men's basketball team
Players
Coaches

Pos.	#	Name	Height	Weight	Year	Previous school	Hometown
F	0	JC Butler	6 ft 5 in (1.96 m)	195 lb (88 kg)	RS Sr	The Prairie School	Racine, Wisconsin
G	1	Dawson Baker	6 ft 4 in (1.93 m)	190 lb (86 kg)	Jr	Capistrano Valley High School	Coto de Caza, California
G	2	Justin Hohn	6 ft 2 in (1.88 m)	185 lb (84 kg)	RS Jr	Tea High School	Sioux Falls, South Dakota
G	3	Pierre Crockrell II	6 ft 0 in (1.83 m)	180 lb (82 kg)	Sr	Pacific	Tacoma, Washington
G	4	Andre Henry	6 ft 4 in (1.93 m)	180 lb (82 kg)	Jr	Saint Francis High School	La Cañada Flintridge, California
F	5	Chazz Hutchinson	6 ft 9 in (2.06 m)	190 lb (86 kg)	Jr	Fullerton College	Mission Viejo, California
G	10	Ofure Ujadughele (W)	6 ft 5 in (1.96 m)	210 lb (95 kg)	RS Jr	Chino Hills High School	Chino Hills, California
F	11	Devin Tillis	6 ft 6 in (1.98 m)	210 lb (95 kg)	Jr	UNLV	Los Angeles, California
F	13	Hayden Welling	6 ft 8 in (2.03 m)	210 lb (95 kg)	Fr	Corner Canyon High School	Draper, Utah
C	15	Bent Leuchten	7 ft 0 in (2.13 m)	258 lb (117 kg)	So	Josef-Effner Gymnasium	Karlsfeld, Bavaria, Germany
G	21	Langston Redfield (W)	6 ft 3 in (1.91 m)	185 lb (84 kg)	So	Capistrano Valley High School	Mission Viejo, California
G	22	DJ Davis	6 ft 1 in (1.85 m)	170 lb (77 kg)	Jr	Riverside Polytechnic High School	Moreno Valley, California
G/F	23	Emilis Butkus	6 ft 5 in (1.96 m)	215 lb (98 kg)	Fr	International Basketball Academy Munich	Vilnius, Lithuania
F	31	Dean Keeler (W)	6 ft 11 in (2.11 m)	240 lb (109 kg)	Sr	Marina High School	Westminster, California
F/C	33	Eli Chol	6 ft 11 in (2.11 m)	175 lb (79 kg)	Fr	Forsyth Central High School	Cumming, Georgia
F	43	Akiva McBirney-Griffin	6 ft 9 in (2.06 m)	220 lb (100 kg)	So	St John's College, Hamilton	Hamilton, New Zealand

Head coach

- Russell Turner (Hampden–Sydney)

Assistant coach(es)

- Ryan Badrtalei (UCLA)
- Michael Wilder (UC Irvine)
- Alex Young (UC Irvine)

Legend

- (C) Team captain
- (S) Suspended
- (I) Ineligible
- (W) Walk-on
- Injured
- Current redshirt

Roster
Last update: October 28, 2022

== Schedule and results ==
Date time, TV	Rank^{#}	Opponent^{#}	Result	Record	High points	High rebounds	High assists	Site (attendance) city, state
Exhibition
November 3, 2022*; 7:00 pm		Alaska Anchorage	W 87–83 ^{OT}	–	28 – Davis	10 – Leuchten	4 – Tied	Bren Events Center (1,508); Irvine, CA
Non-conference regular season
November 7, 2022*; 7:00 pm, ESPN+		Chapman	W 96–50	1–0	14 – Tied	7 – Ujadughele	6 – Crockrell II	Bren Events Center (3,046); Irvine, CA
November 11, 2022*; 8:00 pm, P12 Oregon		at No. 21 Oregon	W 69–56	2–0	24 – Davis	6 – Leuchten	5 – Crockrell II	Matthew Knight Arena (6,454); Eugene, OR
November 15, 2022*; 7:00 pm, ESPN+		Loyola Marymount	W 79–64	3–0	20 – Leuchten	6 – Tillis	4 – Crockrell II	Bren Events Center (3,136); Irvine, CA
November 19, 2022*; 5:00 pm, WCC Network		at Pepperdine	L 55–64	3–1	12 – Baker	14 – Leuchten	4 – Crockrell II	Firestone Fieldhouse (904); Malibu, CA
November 21, 2022*; 7:00 pm, ESPN+		Life Pacific	W 116–54	4–1	14 – Henry	9 – Hutchinson	6 – Crockrell II	Bren Events Center (1,431); Irvine, CA
November 25, 2022*; 4:00 pm, EventLive+		vs. Nicholls; Las Vegas Holiday Classic semifinals	W 83–56	5–1	18 – Davis	12 – Leuchten	9 – Crockrell II	Orleans Arena; Paradise, NV
November 26, 2022*; 6:30 pm, EventLive+		vs. New Mexico State; Las Vegas Holiday Classic championship	W 85–68	6–1	25 – Davis	10 – Keeler	5 – Crockrell II	Orleans Arena; Paradise, Nevada
November 29, 2022*; 7:00 pm, YurView/MW Network		at No. 24 San Diego State	L 69–72	6–2	28 – Davis	8 – Tillis	4 – Hohn	Viejas Arena (12,414); San Diego, CA
December 3, 2022*; 6:00 pm, ESPN+		Fresno State	L 66–80	6–3	12 – Baker	4 – Tied	3 – Tied	Bren Events Center (2,120); Irvine, CA
December 10, 2022*; 11:00 am, Midco+		at South Dakota	W 83–71	7–3	17 – Davis	6 – Hutchison	3 – Crockrell II	Sanford Coyote Sports Center (1,976); Vermillion, SD
December 15, 2022*; 7:00 pm, WCC Network		at Santa Clara	L 74–86	7–4	14 – Tied	6 – Leuchten	5 – Hohn	Leavey Center (880); Santa Clara, CA
December 20, 2022*; 7:00 pm, ESPN+		Harvard	L 57–62	7–5	15 – Leuchten	8 – Tied	3 – Tied	Bren Events Center (2,466); Irvine, CA
Big West regular season
December 31, 2022; 7:00 pm, SNLA/ESPN+		at Cal State Bakersfield	W 79–75	8–5 (1–0)	17 – Baker	9 – Tillis	6 – Crockrell II	Icardo Center (1,183); Bakersfield, CA
January 5, 2023; 6:00 pm, ESPN+		at UC Davis	W 88–83	9–5 (2–0)	31 – Leuchten	7 – Tillis	7 – Crockrell II	University Credit Union Center (749); Davis, CA
January 7, 2023; 6:00 pm, ESPN+		Long Beach State; Black & Blue Rivalry	W 87–70	10–5 (3–0)	20 – Davis	7 – Henry	10 – Crockrell II	Bren Events Center (2,741); Irvine, CA
January 11, 2023; 7:00 pm, ESPN+		Cal State Fullerton	W 70–65	11–5 (4–0)	17 – Baker	12 – Tillis	2 – Tied	Bren Events Center (1,891); Irvine, CA
January 14, 2023; 1:00 pm, SNLA/ESPN+		at CSUN	W 71–57	12–5 (5–0)	11 – Baker	11 – Tillis	8 – Crockrell II	Premier America Credit Union Arena (227); Northridge, CA
January 16, 2023; 6:00 pm, ESPN+		UC Santa Barbara	L 65–73	12–6 (5–1)	17 – Baker	7 – Tillis	4 – Henry	Bren Events Center (3,123); Irvine, CA
January 19, 2023; 7:00 pm, ESPN+		Hawaiʻi	W 76–68	13–6 (6–1)	18 – Davis	10 – Baker	3 – Tied	Bren Events Center (2,223); Irvine, CA
January 26, 2023; 7:00 pm, SNLA/ESPN+		at Cal State Fullerton	L 61–62	13–7 (6–2)	16 – Baker	7 – Ujadughele	2 – Tied	Titan Gym (1,219); Fullerton, CA
January 28, 2023; 7:00 pm, ESPN+		CSUN	W 81–56	14–7 (7–2)	18 – Tillis	6 – Welling	3 – Tied	Bren Events Center (2,649); Irvine, CA
February 2, 2023; 7:00 pm, ESPN+		at UC San Diego	W 76–60	15–7 (8–2)	18 – Baker	9 – Tillis	7 – Crockrell II	LionTree Arena (2,812); La Jolla, CA
February 4, 2023; 4:00 pm, ESPN+		at Long Beach State; Black & Blue Rivalry	L 88–93	15–8 (8–3)	23 – Baker	9 – Tillis	10 – Crockrell II	Walter Pyramid (2,361); Long Beach, CA
February 9, 2023; 7:00 pm, ESPN+		Cal Poly	W 55–54	16–8 (9–3)	16 – Davis	8 – Leuchten	8 – Crockrell II	Bren Events Center (1,622); Irvine, CA
February 11, 2023; 7:30 pm, ESPNU		UC Riverside; Homecoming Game	W 83–64	17–8 (10–3)	23 – Baker	5 – Baker	11 – Crockrell II	Bren Events Center (4,862); Irvine, CA
February 15, 2023; 7:00 pm, ESPN+		at UC Santa Barbara	W 70–59	18–8 (11–3)	25 – Davis	10 – Tillis	3 – Tied	The Thunderdome (2,175); Santa Barbara, CA
February 18, 2023; 6:00 pm, SNLA/ESPN+		UC Davis	W 78–76	19–8 (12–3)	18 – Tied	9 – Leuchten	5 – Tillis	Bren Events Center (1,812); Irvine, CA
February 20, 2023; 7:00 pm, ESPN+		at Cal Poly	W 59–56	20–8 (13–3)	20 – Baker	7 – Henry	6 – Cockrell II	Mott Athletics Center (1,674); San Luis Obispo, CA
February 23, 2023; 7:00 pm, ESPN+		UC San Diego	L 91–99	20–9 (13–4)	33 – Baker	6 – Tied	11 – Cockrell II	Bren Events Center (2,339); Irvine, CA
February 25, 2023; 7:00 pm, ESPN2		at Hawaiʻi	L 67–72	20–10 (13–5)	27 – Davis	8 – Ujadughele	3 – Baker	Stan Sheriff Center (10,300); Honolulu, HI
March 2, 2023; 7:00 pm, ESPN+		at UC Riverside	W 75–65	21–10 (14–5)	26 – Davis	8 – Crockell II	4 – Ujadughele	SRC Arena (2,503); Riverside, CA
March 4, 2023; 6:00 pm, ESPN+		Cal State Bakersfield	W 52–44	22–10 (15–5)	15 – Hohn	7 – Leuchten	5 – Crockrell II	Bren Events Center (2,803); Irvine, CA
Big West tournament
March 9, 2023; 12:00 pm, ESPN+	(1)	vs. (8) Cal State Bakersfield; Quarterfinals	W 75–51	23–10	13 – Butler	7 – Tied	3 – Tied	Dollar Loan Center; Henderson, NV
March 10, 2023; 6:00 pm, ESPN+	(1)	vs. (4) Cal State Fullerton; Semifinals	L 80–83	23–11	22 – Baker	7 – Tillis	4 – Crockrell II	Dollar Loan Center; Henderson, NV
National Invitational Tournament
March 15, 2023; 8:00 pm, ESPN2		at (1) Oregon; First round – Oregon bracket	L 58–84	23–12	16 – Baker	11 – Tillis	6 – Crockrell II	Matthew Knight Arena (2,431); Eugene, OR
*Non-conference game. ^{#}Rankings from AP Poll. (#) Tournament seedings in parentheses.
