= 2022–23 UC Riverside Highlanders men's basketball team =

American college basketball season

2022–23 UC Riverside Highlanders men's basketball

Vegas 4 champions
- Conference: Big West Conference
- Record: 22–12 (14–6 Big West)
- Head coach: Mike Magpayo (3rd season)
- Assistant coaches: Eddie Hill; Dustin Yoder; Troy Hammel
- Home arena: SRC Arena (Capacity: 3,168)

2022–23 Big West men's basketball standings
	Conf.				Overall
Team	W		L	PCT	W		L	PCT
UC Santa Barbara †	15	–	5	.750	27	–	8	.771
UC Irvine	15	–	5	.750	23	–	12	.657
UC Riverside	14	–	6	.700	22	–	12	.647
Cal State Fullerton	12	–	6	.667	20	–	13	.606
Hawai'i	13	–	7	.650	22	–	11	.667
UC Davis	11	–	8	.579	18	–	14	.563
Long Beach State	11	–	9	.550	17	–	16	.515
Cal State Bakersfield	6	–	14	.300	11	–	22	.333
UC San Diego*	5	–	13	.278	10	–	20	.333
Cal State Northridge	4	–	16	.200	7	–	25	.219
Cal Poly	1	–	18	.053	8	–	25	.242
† 2023 Big West tournament winner * ineligible for the 2023 NCAA tournament due to transition period

The 2022–23 UC Riverside Highlanders men's basketball team represented the University of California, Riverside in the 2022–23 NCAA Division I men's basketball season. The Highlanders, led by third-year head coach Mike Magpayo, played their home games at SRC Arena in Riverside, California as members of the Big West Conference.

== Previous season ==
The Highlanders finished the 2021–22 season 16–12, 9–6 in Big West play, to finish in sixth place. They were defeated by Hawaii in the first round of the Big West tournament.

== Roster ==
2022–23 UC Riverside Highlanders men's basketball team
Players
Coaches

Pos.	#	Name	Height	Weight	Year	Previous school	Hometown
F	0	Kyle Owens	6 ft 8 in (2.03 m)	205 lb (93 kg)	GS	Montana	Calabasas, CA
G	1	Nate Pickens	6 ft 4 in (1.93 m)	—	Fr	Dream City Christian	El Mirage, AZ
F	2	Kaleb Smith	6 ft 8 in (2.03 m)	—	Fr	Damien HS	Rancho Cucamonga, CA
G	3	Kobe Jerome	6 ft 4 in (1.93 m)	190 lb (86 kg)	RS Fr	Blue Ridge School	Harlem, NY
G	4	Jamal II Hartwell	5 ft 10 in (1.78 m)	155 lb (70 kg)	GS	George Mason	Inglewood, CA
G	5	Zyon Pullin	6 ft 4 in (1.93 m)	195 lb (88 kg)	Sr	College Park HS	Pleasant Hill, CA
G/F	10	Niyi Olabode	6 ft 5 in (1.96 m)	—	So	Miramonte HS	Orinda, CA
G	11	Flynn Cameron	6 ft 5 in (1.96 m)	210 lb (95 kg)	GS	DePaul	Gold Coast, Australia
C	12	Jhaylon Martinez	6 ft 11 in (2.11 m)	260 lb (118 kg)	RS So	UNLV	Vallejo, CA
F	13	Vladimer Salaridze	6 ft 7 in (2.01 m)	—	So	Eastern Florida State College	Tbilisi, Georgia
F	14	Wil Tattersall	6 ft 7 in (2.01 m)	210 lb (95 kg)	Jr	Center of Excellence	Melbourne, Australia
F	22	Luke Turner	6 ft 7 in (2.01 m)	195 lb (88 kg)	So	Wofford	Temecula, CA
G	24	Barrington Hargress	6 ft 0 in (1.83 m)	195 lb (88 kg)	Fr	Heritage Christian School	Inglewood, CA
G	25	Anthony Bell	6 ft 1 in (1.85 m)	165 lb (75 kg)	Jr	San Bernardino Valley College	Chino Hills, CA
F	31	Lachlan Olbrich	6 ft 10 in (2.08 m)	—	Fr	Adelaide 36ers	Adelaide, Australia

Head coach

- Mike Magpayo (UC Santa Barbara)

Assistant coach(es)

- Eddie Hill (Washington State)
- Dustin Yoder (Illinois)
- Troy Hammel (UC Riverside)

Legend

- (C) Team captain
- (S) Suspended
- (I) Ineligible
- (W) Walk-on
- Injured
- Current redshirt

Roster
Last update: November 19, 2022

== Schedule and results ==
Date time, TV	Rank^{#}	Opponent^{#}	Result	Record	High points	High rebounds	High assists	Site (attendance) city, state
Exhibition
October 28, 2022*; 6:00 p.m.		Cal State Dominguez Hills	W 94–79	–	21 – Cameron	9 – Owens	5 – Pullin	SRC Arena (315); Riverside, CA
Non-conference regular season
November 7, 2022*; 5:30 p.m., P12N		at Colorado	L 66–82	0–1	17 – Pullin	10 – Olbrich	2 – Cameron	CU Events Center (5,388); Boulder, CO
November 10, 2022*; 7:00 p.m., WCC Network		at Loyola Marymount	W 81–79	1–1	23 – Pullin	7 – 2 tied	6 – Pullin	Gersten Pavilion (1,022); Los Angeles, CA
November 17, 2022*; 5:30 p.m., FS1		at No. 10 Creighton	L 51–80	1–2	11 – Tattersall	6 – 2 tied	2 – 3 tied	CHI Health Center Omaha (16,456); Omaha, NE
November 19, 2022*; 4:00 p.m., ESPN+		Occidental	W 106–30	2–2	16 – Olbrich	12 – Martinez	6 – Cameron	SRC Arena (650); Riverside, CA
November 21, 2022*; 7:00 p.m.		vs. Weber State; Vegas 4	W 72–65	3–2	27 – Pullin	7 – Cameron	3 – 2 tied	Dollar Loan Center; Henderson, NV
November 22, 2022*; 7:00 p.m.		vs. Wright State; Vegas 4	W 70–65	4–2	18 – Cameron	13 – Owens	4 – 2 tied	Dollar Loan Center; Henderson, NV
November 23, 2022*; 3:30 p.m.		vs. Abilene Christian; Vegas 4	W 76–65	5–2	26 – Cameron	8 – Cameron	4 – Pullin	Dollar Loan Center; Henderson, NV
November 30, 2022*; 7:00 p.m., ESPN+		at California Baptist	L 60–65	5–3	19 – Pullin	8 – Cameron	7 – Pullin	CBU Events Center (4,038); Riverside, CA
December 11, 2022*; 2:00 p.m., ESPN+		at Idaho	W 76–74	6–3	26 – Pullin	7 – Tattersall	4 – Cameron	ICCU Arena (1,294); Moscow, ID
December 14, 2022*; 6:00 p.m., P12N		at Oregon	L 65–71	6–4	21 – Pullin	6 – Owens	3 – 2 tied	Matthew Knight Arena (4,738); Eugene, OR
December 20, 2022*; 7:00 p.m., ESPN+		San Diego	L 84–92 ^{OT}	6–5	30 – Pullin	7 – 2 tied	6 – Pullin	SRC Arena (307); Riverside, CA
December 22, 2022*; 2:00 p.m., ESPN+		Portland	W 76–65	7–5	19 – Pullin	7 – 2 tied	8 – Cameron	SRC Arena (264); Riverside, CA
Big West regular season
December 29, 2022; 5:00 p.m., ESPN+		Cal State Bakersfield	W 71–59	8–5 (1–0)	17 – Owens	10 – Martinez	6 – Pullin	SRC Arena (263); Riverside, CA
December 31, 2022; 3:00 p.m., ESPN+		at Long Beach State	W 73–72	9–5 (2–0)	22 – Pullin	8 – Martinez	5 – Pullin	Walter Pyramid (1,143); Long Beach, CA
January 5, 2023; 7:00 p.m., ESPN+		Cal State Fullerton	L 62–77	9–6 (2–1)	13 – Martinez	7 – 2 tied	4 – Cameron	SRC Arena; Riverside, CA
January 7, 2023; 5:00 p.m., ESPN+		Cal State Northridge	W 68–45	10–6 (3–1)	12 – Owens	8 – Olbrich	4 – Cameron	SRC Arena (278); Riverside, CA
January 11, 2023; 7:00 p.m., ESPN+		at UC San Diego	W 74–68	11–6 (4–1)	30 – Hartwell II	14 – Owens	4 – Tattersall	LionTree Arena (1,813); La Jolla, CA
January 14, 2023; 7:00 p.m.		at UC Santa Barbara	W 65–64	12–6 (5–1)	19 – Owens	15 – Owens	9 – Cameron	The Thunderdome (3,384); Santa Barbara, CA
January 16, 2023; 5:00 p.m., ESPN+		Cal Poly	W 83–78 ^{OT}	13–6 (6–1)	25 – Cameron	10 – Owens	6 – Cameron	SRC Arena (857); Riverside, CA
January 19, 2023; 6:00 p.m., ESPN+		at UC Davis	W 74–72	14–6 (7–1)	19 – Cameron	8 – 2 tied	3 – 3 tied	University Credit Union Center (1,307); Davis, CA
January 21, 2023; 5:00 p.m., ESPN+		Hawaii	L 63–67	14–7 (7–2)	21 – Olbrich	14 – Cameron	2 – 4 tied	SRC Arena (722); Riverside, CA
January 28, 2023; 5:00 p.m., ESPN+		UC San Diego	W 72–65	15–7 (8–2)	23 – Pullin	7 – Cameron	4 – 2 tied	SRC Arena (359); Riverside, CA
February 2, 2023; 7:00 p.m., ESPN+		at Cal State Bakersfield	L 76–82 ^{OT}	15–8 (8–3)	26 – Pullin	5 – Olbrich	5 – Pullin	Icardo Center (1,052); Bakersfield, CA
February 4, 2023; 6:00 p.m., ESPN+		at Cal State Fullerton	L 58–64	15–9 (8–4)	10 – Olbrich	8 – Pullin	5 – Pullin	Titan Gym (1,082); Fullerton, CA
February 9, 2023; 7:00 p.m., ESPN+		UC Davis	W 72–65	16–9 (9–4)	16 – Pullin	10 – Turner	5 – Pullin	SRC Arena (629); Riverside, CA
February 11, 2023; 7:30 p.m., ESPNU		at UC Irvine	L 64–83	16–10 (9–5)	22 – Olbrich	7 – Martinez	5 – Cameron	Bren Events Center (4,862); Irvine, CA
February 15, 2023; 7:00 p.m., ESPN+		Long Beach State	W 88–76	17–10 (10–5)	24 – Cameron	8 – Olbrich	5 – 2 tied	SRC Arena (1,274); Riverside, CA
February 18, 2023; 5:00 p.m., ESPN+		UC Santa Barbara	W 74–63	18–10 (11–5)	23 – Olbrich	6 – 2 tied	7 – Pullin	SRC Arena (746); Riverside, CA
February 20, 2023; 7:00 p.m., ESPN+		at Cal State Northridge	W 96–76	19–10 (12–5)	22 – Olbrich	7 – Salaridze	9 – Pullin	Premier America Credit Union Arena (378); Northridge, CA
February 23, 2023; 9:00 p.m.		at Hawaii	W 54–52	20–10 (13–5)	24 – Pullin	10 – Olbrich	2 – Olbrich	Stan Sheriff Center (4,957); Honolulu, HI
March 2, 2023; 7:00 p.m., ESPN+		UC Irvine	L 65–75	20–11 (13–6)	26 – Cameron	6 – tied	7 – Pullin	SRC Arena (2,503); Riverside, CA
March 4, 2023; 7:00 p.m., ESPN+		at Cal Poly	W 73–72 ^{OT}	21–11 (14–6)	28 – Pullin	10 – Pullin	5 – Cameron	Mott Athletics Center (2,282); San Luis Obispo, CA
Big West tournament
March 9, 2023; 8:30 p.m., ESPN+	(3)	vs. (6) UC Davis; Quarterfinals	W 68–52	22–11	19 – Pullin	9 – Cameron	5 – Cameron	Dollar Loan Center (902); Henderson, NV
March 10, 2023; 8:30 p.m., ESPNU	(3)	vs. (2) UC Santa Barbara; Semifinals	L 87–92	22–12	31 – Cameron	7 – Olbrich	6 – Cameron	Dollar Loan Center (1,194); Henderson, NV
*Non-conference game. ^{#}Rankings from AP poll. (#) Tournament seedings in parentheses. All times are in Pacific.
