= 2023 Big West Conference men's basketball tournament =

- Classification: Division I
- Season: 2022–23
- Teams: 10
- Site: Dollar Loan Center; Henderson, Nevada
- Champions: UC Santa Barbara (5th title)
- Winning coach: Joe Pasternack (2nd title)
- Television: ESPN+ ESPNU; ESPN2

2022–23 Big West men's basketball standings
	Conf.				Overall
Team	W		L	PCT	W		L	PCT
UC Santa Barbara †	15	–	5	.750	27	–	8	.771
UC Irvine	15	–	5	.750	23	–	12	.657
UC Riverside	14	–	6	.700	22	–	12	.647
Cal State Fullerton	12	–	6	.667	20	–	13	.606
Hawai'i	13	–	7	.650	22	–	11	.667
UC Davis	11	–	8	.579	18	–	14	.563
Long Beach State	11	–	9	.550	17	–	16	.515
Cal State Bakersfield	6	–	14	.300	11	–	22	.333
UC San Diego*	5	–	13	.278	10	–	20	.333
Cal State Northridge	4	–	16	.200	7	–	25	.219
Cal Poly	1	–	18	.053	8	–	25	.242
† 2023 Big West tournament winner * ineligible for the 2023 NCAA tournament due to transition period

The 2023 Big West Conference men's basketball tournament was the postseason men's basketball tournament for the Big West Conference of the 2022–23 NCAA Division I men's basketball season. It was held March 7–11, 2023, at the Dollar Loan Center in Henderson, Nevada. The winner, the UC Santa Barbara Gauchos, received the conference's automatic bid to the 2023 NCAA tournament.

== Seeds ==
Of the 11 conference teams, 10 were eligible for the tournament. UC San Diego was ineligible for the tournament, as it was in the third year of the four-year transition required for teams transferring to Division I from Division II. Teams were seeded based on their performance within the conference, and teams with identical conference records were seeded using a tiebreaker system. Unlike previous years before 2020, teams were no longer reseeded before the semifinals.

Seed	School	Record	Tiebreaker
1	UC Irvine	15-5	2-0 vs UCR
2	UC Santa Barbara	15-5	0-2 vs UCR
3	UC Riverside	14-6	
4	Cal State Fullerton	12-6	
5	Hawai'i	13-7	
6	UC Davis	11-8	
7	Long Beach State	11-9	
8	Cal State Bakersfield	6-14	
9	Cal State Northridge	4-16	
10	Cal Poly	1-18	

== Schedule and results ==
Game	Time	Matchup	Score	Television
First round – Tuesday, March 7
1	6:00 pm	No. 8 Cal State Bakersfield vs. No. 9 Cal State Northridge	51–47	ESPN+
2	8:30 pm	No. 7 Long Beach State vs. No. 10 Cal Poly	68–88	ESPN+
Quarterfinals – Thursday, March 9
3	12:00 pm	No. 1 UC Irvine vs. No. 8 Cal State Bakersfield	75–51	ESPN+
4	2:30 pm	No. 4 Cal State Fullerton vs. No. 5 Hawai'i	62–60^{OT}	ESPN+
5	6:00 pm	No. 2 UC Santa Barbara vs. No. 10 Cal Poly	64–54	ESPN+
6	8:30 pm	No. 3 UC Riverside vs. No. 6 UC Davis	68–52	ESPN+
Semifinals – Friday, March 10
7	6:00 pm	No. 1 UC Irvine vs No. 4 Cal State Fullerton	80–83	ESPN+
8	8:30 pm	No. 2 UC Santa Barbara vs No. 3 UC Riverside	92–87	ESPNU
Final – Saturday, March 11
9	6:30 pm	No. 4 Cal State Fullerton vs No. 2 UC Santa Barbara	62–72	ESPN2
*Game times in PST. Rankings denote tournament seed

== Bracket ==
First round March 7 ESPN+
8	Cal State Bakersfield	51
9	Cal State Northridge	47
7	Long Beach State	68
10	Cal Poly	88

Quarterfinals; March 9 ESPN+
1	UC Irvine	75
8	Cal State Bakersfield	51
4	Cal State Fullerton	62*
5	Hawai'i	60
2	UC Santa Barbara	64
10	Cal Poly	54
3	UC Riverside	68
6	UC Davis	52

Semifinals; March 10; ESPN Networks
1	UC Irvine	80
4	Cal State Fullerton	83
2	UC Santa Barbara	92
3	UC Riverside	87

Championship; March 11; ESPN2
4	Cal State Fullerton	62
2	UC Santa Barbara	72
