= 2022–23 Fresno State Bulldogs men's basketball team =

American college basketball season

2022–23 Fresno State Bulldogs men's basketball
- Conference: Mountain West Conference
- Record: 11–20 (6–12 MW)
- Head coach: Justin Hutson (5th season)
- Assistant coaches: Keith Brown; Vonn Webb; Nelson Hernandez
- Home arena: Save Mart Center (Capacity: 15,596)

2022–23 Mountain West Conference men's basketball standings
	Conf.				Overall
Team	W		L	PCT	W		L	PCT
No. 18 San Diego State †	15	–	3	.833	32	–	7	.821
Boise State	13	–	5	.722	24	–	10	.706
Utah State	13	–	5	.722	26	–	9	.743
Nevada	12	–	6	.667	22	–	11	.667
San Jose State	10	–	8	.556	21	–	14	.600
New Mexico	8	–	10	.444	22	–	12	.647
UNLV	7	–	11	.389	19	–	13	.594
Colorado State	6	–	12	.333	15	–	18	.455
Fresno State	6	–	12	.333	11	–	20	.355
Air Force	5	–	13	.278	14	–	18	.438
Wyoming	4	–	14	.222	9	–	22	.290
† Conference tournament winner Rankings from AP poll

The 2022–23 Fresno State Bulldogs men's basketball team represented California State University, Fresno in the 2022–23 NCAA Division I men's basketball season. The Bulldogs were led by fifth-year head coach Justin Hutson and played their home games at the Save Mart Center as members of the Mountain West Conference.

== Previous season ==
The Bulldogs finished the 2021–22 season 23–13, 8–9 in Mountain West play to finish in sixth place. They defeated San Jose State in the first round of the Mountain West tournament before losing to San Diego State State in the quarterfinals. They were invited to The Basketball Classic where they defeated Eastern Washington, Youngstown State, Southern Utah and Coastal Carolina to win The Basketball Classic.

== Offseason ==
=== Departures ===
Name	Number	Pos.	Height	Weight	Year	Hometown	Reason for departure
Kyle Harding	0	G	6'3"	185	Junior	Roosevelt, NY	Transferred to Prairie View A&M
Junior Ballard	4	G	6'3"	185	Senior	Stockton, CA	Graduate transferred to Weber State
Orlando Robinson	10	F	7'0"	235	Junior	Las Vegas, NV	Declare for 2022 NBA draft
Deon Stroud	13	G	6'5"	200	Junior	Fresno, CA	Transferred to Eastern Washington
Robert Vaihola	30	F	6'8"	245	Freshman	San Francisco, CA	Transferred to San Jose State
Braxton Meah	34	C	7'1"	250	Sophomore	Fresno, CA	Transferred to Washington

=== Incoming transfers ===
Name	Number	Pos.	Height	Weight	Year	Hometown	Previous college
Alexander Gorton	4	G	6'3"	190	RS Senior	Jonesboro, AR	Palm Beach Atlantic
Isaih Moore	11	F	6'10"	205	Senior	Columbia, SC	Southern Miss
Jordan Brinson	12	G	6'2"	175	Junior	Inglewood, CA	Salt Lake CC
Chuks Isitua	15	C	6'11	220	Sophomore	Lagos, Nigeria	IUPUI
Eduardo Andre	35	F	6'11"	236	Junior	Potomac, MD	Fresno State

=== 2022 recruiting class ===
College recruiting information
Name	Hometown	School	Height	Weight	Commit date
Joseph Hunter #30 SG	Fresno, CA	San Joaquin Memorial High School	6 ft 3 in (1.91 m)	185 lb (84 kg)	Jul 30, 2021
Joseph Hunter #30 SG	Recruit ratings: Scout: Rivals: 247Sports: ESPN: (82)				
Overall recruit ranking: Scout: – Rivals: –
Note: In many cases, Scout, Rivals, 247Sports, On3, and ESPN may conflict in their listings of height and weight.; In these cases, the average was taken. ESPN grades are on a 100-point scale.; Sources: "Fresno State Commit List for 2022". Rivals.; "Men's Basketball Recruiting". Scout.; "ESPN – Fresno State Bulldogs Basketball Recruiting 2022". ESPN.; "Scout.com Team Recruiting Rankings". Scout.; "2022 Team Ranking". Rivals.

== Roster ==
2022–23 Fresno State Bulldogs men's basketball team
Players
Coaches

Pos.	#	Name	Height	Weight	Year	Previous school	Hometown
G	0	Donavan Yap	6 ft 5 in (1.96 m)	185 lb (84 kg)	Jr	UNLV	Las Vegas, NV
G	1	Jemarl Baker Jr.	6 ft 5 in (1.96 m)	195 lb (88 kg)	GS	Arizona	Menifee, CA
G	3	Isaiah Hill	6 ft 0 in (1.83 m)	170 lb (77 kg)	Sr	Tulsa	Bakersfield, CA
G	4	Alexander Gorton	6 ft 3 in (1.91 m)	190 lb (86 kg)	Sr	Palm Beach Atlantic	Jonesboro, AR
G	5	Jordan Campbell	6 ft 4 in (1.93 m)	200 lb (91 kg)	RS Sr	Oregon State	Adelanto, CA
F	11	Isaih Moore	6 ft 10 in (2.08 m)	195 lb (88 kg)	Sr	Southern Miss	Columbia, SC
F	12	Jordan Brinson	6 ft 2 in (1.88 m)	170 lb (77 kg)	Jr	Salt Lake CC	Inglewood, CA
G	13	Jeff Sims (W)	6 ft 1 in (1.85 m)	170 lb (77 kg)	Fr	Santa Rosa Academy	Menifee, CA
G	14	Joseph Hunter	6 ft 5 in (1.96 m)	190 lb (86 kg)	Fr	San Joaquin Memorial HS	Fresno, CA
C	15	Chuks Isitua	6 ft 11 in (2.11 m)	220 lb (100 kg)	So	IUPUI	Lagos, Nigeria
G	22	Destin Whitaker	6 ft 5 in (1.96 m)	185 lb (84 kg)	Jr	Romeoville HS	Romeoville, IL
G/F	23	Leo Colimerio	6 ft 7 in (2.01 m)	190 lb (86 kg)	Jr	Wasatch Academy	São Paulo, Brazil
G	25	Anthony Holland	6 ft 5 in (1.96 m)	225 lb (102 kg)	Sr	Notre Dame HS	Riverside, CA
G	33	Steven Vasquez (W)	6 ft 2 in (1.88 m)	190 lb (86 kg)	So	St. Joseph HS	Santa Maria, CA
C	35	Eduardo Andre	6 ft 11 in (2.11 m)	240 lb (109 kg)	Jr	AZ Compass Prep	London, England

Head coach

- Justin Hutson (Cal State Bakersfield)

Assistant coach(es)

- Keith Brown (Pacific)
- Vonn Webb (Western New Mexico)
- Nelson Hernandez (Utah State)

Legend

- (C) Team captain
- (S) Suspended
- (I) Ineligible
- (W) Walk-on
- Injured
- Current redshirt

Roster

== Schedule and results ==
Date time, TV	Rank^{#}	Opponent^{#}	Result	Record	High points	High rebounds	High assists	Site (attendance) city, state
Exhibition
November 2, 2022*; 7:00 p.m.		Stanislaus State	W 69–62		22 – Hill	9 – Holland	3 – Donavan	Save Mart Center (2,073); Fresno, CA
Regular season
November 7, 2022*; 7:00 p.m., MW Network		Fresno Pacific	W 69–56	1–0	19 – Moore	10 – Moore	5 – Yap	Save Mart Center (3,675); Fresno, CA
November 11, 2022*; 2:00 p.m., FloSports		vs. UC Santa Barbara	L 54–61	1–1	12 – Hill	7 – Holland	4 – Yap	Kaiser Permanente Arena (121); Santa Cruz, CA
November 16, 2022*; 7:00 p.m., MW Network		San Francisco	L 60–67	1–2	17 – Campbell	8 – Moore	3 – Moore	Save Mart Center (3,123); Fresno, CA
November 19, 2022*; 3:00 p.m., ESPN+		at North Texas	L 52–61	1–3	14 – Campbell	7 – Moore	2 – Moore	The Super Pit (3,657); Denton, TX
November 23, 2022*; 6:30 p.m., ESPNU		vs. Washington; Wooden Legacy Semifinals	L 57–62	1–4	15 – Moore	13 – Moore	8 – Campbell	Anaheim Convention Center (1,328); Anaheim, CA
November 24, 2022*; 7:00 p.m., ESPNU		vs. Vanderbilt; Wooden Legacy 3rd place game	L 59–67	1–5	22 – Baker	12 – Tied	7 – Baker	Anaheim Convention Center (621); Anaheim, CA
December 3, 2022*; 6:00 p.m., ESPN+		at UC Irvine	W 80–66	2–5	22 – Moore	9 – Moore	5 – Baker	Bren Events Center (2,120); Irvine, CA
December 7, 2022*; 7:00 p.m., MW Network		Cal State Northridge	W 65–56	3–5	17 – Yap	10 – Moore	3 – Tied	Save Mart Center (3,008); Fresno, CA
December 10, 2022*; 2:00 p.m., WCC Network		at Pacific	L 72–76	3–6	15 – Tied	9 – Moore	5 – Hill	Alex G. Spanos Center (1,792); Stockton, CA
December 17, 2022*; 4:00 p.m., MW Network		Sacramento State	L 53–59	3–7	13 – Campbell	4 – Tied	3 – Tied	Save Mart Center (3,913); Fresno, CA
December 20, 2022*; 7:00 p.m., ESPN+		at Cal State Bakersfield	W 56–48	4–7	17 – Hill	4 – Tied	8 – Hill	Icardo Center (2,531); Bakersfield, CA
December 28, 2022; 8:00 p.m., CBSSN		Wyoming	W 58–53	5–7 (1–0)	20 – Baker	9 – Tied	4 – Baker	Save Mart Center (4,165); Fresno, CA
December 31, 2022; 11:00 a.m., CBSSN		at Utah State	L 54–67	5–8 (1–1)	20 – Baker Jr.	7 – Moore	6 – Hill	Smith Spectrum (6,933); Logan, UT
January 3, 2023; 8:00 p.m., CBSSN		No. 21 New Mexico	W 71–67	6–8 (2–1)	16 – Moore	8 – Tied	5 – Baker	Save Mart Center (4,868); Fresno, CA
January 7, 2023; 1:30 p.m., MW Network		at Colorado State	L 57–79	6–9 (2–2)	23 – Moore	8 – Moore	6 – Hill	Moby Arena (4,196); Fort Collins, CO
January 10, 2023; 7:00 p.m., MW Network		at San José State	L 64–74	6–10 (2–3)	18 – Holland	9 – Moore	5 – Yap	Provident Credit Union Event Center (2,084); San Jose, CA
January 14, 2023; 4:00 p.m., MW Network		Air Force	L 48–51	6–11 (2–4)	14 – Andre	15 – Andre	1 – Tied	Save Mart Center (5,864); Fresno, CA
January 21, 2023; 3:00 p.m., CBSSN		UNLV	W 76–63	7–11 (3–4)	28 – Hill	13 – Andre	5 – Hill	Save Mart Center (5,950); Fresno, CA
January 24, 2023; 6:00 p.m., FS1		at Boise State	L 53–63	7–12 (3–5)	14 – Hill	12 – Andre	7 – Hill	ExtraMile Arena (9,010); Boise, ID
January 28, 2023; 4:00 p.m., MW Network		Utah State	L 53-70	7–13 (3–6)	11 – Tied	8 – Moore	3 – Holland	Save Mart Center (6,817); Fresno, CA
January 31, 2023; 7:00 p.m., FS1		at Wyoming	L 62–85	7–14 (3–7)	11 – Hill	6 – Colimerio	7 – Hill	Arena-Auditorium (3,950); Laramie, WY
February 3, 2023; 8:00 p.m., FS1		at UNLV	W 82–79	8–14 (4–7)	23 – Baker Jr.	8 – Moore	3 – Tied	Thomas & Mack Center (5,762); Paradise, NV
February 7, 2023; 7:00 p.m., MW Network		San José State	W 70–62	9–14 (5–7)	17 – Hill	8 – Andre	5 – Hill	Save Mart Center (5,090); Fresno, CA
February 10, 2023; 8:00 p.m., FS1		at Nevada	L 66–77	9–15 (5–8)	20 – Hill	8 – Andre	5 – Yap	Lawlor Events Center (8,571); Reno, NV
February 15, 2023; 8:00 p.m., CBSSN		No. 21 San Diego State	L 43–45	9–16 (5–9)	16 – Hill	9 – Tied	3 – Tied	Save Mart Center (7,012); Fresno, CA
February 18, 2023; 2:00 p.m., MW Network		Colorado State	L 57–60	9–17 (5–10)	19 – Colimerio	9 – Andre	6 – Baker Jr.	Save Mart Center (7,137); Fresno, CA
February 21, 2023; 6:00 p.m., MW Network		at Air Force	W 74–69	10–17 (6–10)	26 – Andre	7 – Andre	8 – Hill	Clune Arena (847); Colorado Springs, CO
February 24, 2023; 8:00 p.m., FS1		Nevada	L 56–60	10–18 (6–11)	15 – Hill	7 – Baker Jr.	3 – Hill	Save Mart Center (5,107); Fresno, CA
February 28, 2023; 7:30 p.m., FS1		at New Mexico	L 80–94	10–19 (6–12)	16 – Baker Jr.	6 – Colimerio	6 – Hill	The Pit (12,520); Albuquerque, NM
March 4, 2023*; 4:00 p.m., MW Network		Chicago State	W 108–72	11–19	43 – Baker Jr.	10 – Andre	10 – Hill	Save Mart Center (5,145); Fresno, CA
Mountain West tournament
March 8, 2023; 11:00 am, Stadium	(9)	vs. (8) Colorado State; First round	L 65–67	11–20	22 – Hill	10 – Andre	6 – Tied	Thomas & Mack Center; Paradise, NV
*Non-conference game. ^{#}Rankings from AP Poll. (#) Tournament seedings in parentheses. All times are in Pacific Time.
