= Ball Dawgs Classic =

- Formerly: Vegas 4 (2022)
- Sport: College basketball
- Founded: 2022
- Folded: 2024
- Owner: bdG Sports
- No. of teams: 4 (men's); 4 (women's)
- Country: United States
- Venue: Lee's Family Forum
- Broadcaster: FloHoops
- Sponsor: Ball Dawgs
- Related competitions: Continental Tire Main Event
- Tournament format: Round robin

The Ball Dawgs Classic (formerly the Vegas 4) was a college basketball showcase event played in Henderson, Nevada during the week of Thanksgiving. Following the creation of the men's basketball event in 2022, a women's event was added in 2023.

== Tournament history ==
=== Men's best performance ===
Since the Ball Dawgs Classic is a showcase event, it does not crown a champion. Nevertheless, the best performances of each year's event are shown in the table below.

Year	Team	Record
2022	UC Riverside	3–0
2023	Indiana State	3–0
2023	New Mexico	3–0
2023	UC Irvine	3–0
2024	San Jose State	3–0

=== Women's tournament champions ===
Year	Winner	Score	Opponent
2023	Stanford	100–88	Florida State
2024	Duke	109–99^{OT}	Oklahoma

== Event history ==
=== 2024 ===
==== Men's ====
November 25
San Jose State	71
UTEP	65

November 25
Long Beach State	48
UNC Greensboro	71

November 26
UTEP	70
Long Beach State	44

November 26
San Jose State	69
UNC Greensboro	64

November 27
UNC Greensboro	58
UTEP	64

November 27
Long Beach State	66
San Jose State	82

==== Women's ====
Consolation; November 27
9	Kansas State	92
DePaul	66

Semifinals; November 25
13	Duke	73
9	Kansas State	62
8	Oklahoma	85
DePaul	62

Championship; November 27
13	Duke	109*
8	Oklahoma	99

=== 2023 ===
==== Men's ====
November 21
Rice	81
Indiana State	103

November 21
Pepperdine	60
UC Irvine	76

November 21
Toledo	84
New Mexico	92

November 22
Indiana State	90
Pepperdine	82

November 22
New Mexico	90
Rice	56

November 22
UC Irvine	77
Toledo	71

November 24
Toledo	74
Indiana State	76

November 24
Rice	68
UC Irvine	83

November 24
Pepperdine	71
New Mexico	90

==== Women's ====
3rd place Game; November 24
Northwestern	61
Belmont	83

Semifinals; November 22
13	Florida State	92
Northwestern	50
4	Stanford	74
Belmont	55

Championship; November 24
13	Florida State	88
4	Stanford	100

=== 2022 (as Vegas 4) ===
==== Men's ====
November 21
Wright State	77
Abilene Christian	61

November 21
Weber State	65
UC Riverside	72

November 22
Abilene Christian	77
Weber State	67

November 22
UC Riverside	70
Wright State	65

November 23
Weber State	87
Wright State	65

November 23
UC Riverside	76
Abilene Christian	65
