= 2022–23 Cal State Northridge Matadors men's basketball team =

American college basketball season

2022–23 Cal State Northridge Matadors men's basketball
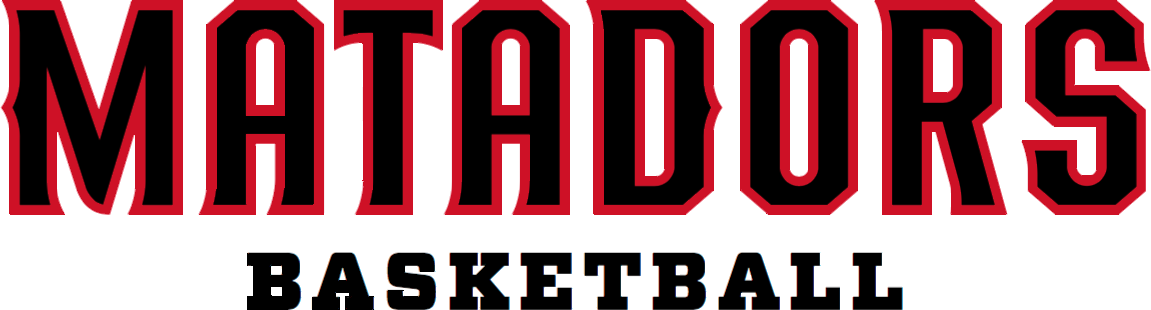
- Conference: Big West Conference
- Record: 7–25 (4–16 Big West)
- Head coach: Trent Johnson (2nd season)
- Assistant coaches: Logan Baumann; Terry Johnson; Chris Tifft
- Home arena: Premier America Credit Union Arena

2022–23 Big West men's basketball standings
	Conf.				Overall
Team	W		L	PCT	W		L	PCT
UC Santa Barbara †	15	–	5	.750	27	–	8	.771
UC Irvine	15	–	5	.750	23	–	12	.657
UC Riverside	14	–	6	.700	22	–	12	.647
Cal State Fullerton	12	–	6	.667	20	–	13	.606
Hawai'i	13	–	7	.650	22	–	11	.667
UC Davis	11	–	8	.579	18	–	14	.563
Long Beach State	11	–	9	.550	17	–	16	.515
Cal State Bakersfield	6	–	14	.300	11	–	22	.333
UC San Diego*	5	–	13	.278	10	–	20	.333
Cal State Northridge	4	–	16	.200	7	–	25	.219
Cal Poly	1	–	18	.053	8	–	25	.242
† 2023 Big West tournament winner * ineligible for the 2023 NCAA tournament due to transition period

The 2022–23 Cal State Northridge Matadors men's basketball team represented California State University, Northridge in the 2022–23 NCAA Division I men's basketball season. The Matadors, led by head coach Trent Johnson, in his second season, and first without the interim tag, played their home games at the Premier America Credit Union Arena in Northridge, California as members of the Big West Conference. They finished the season 7–24, 4–16 in Big West play, to finish in 10th place. Due to UC San Diego's transition to Division I, the Matadors were the No. 9 seed in the Big West tournament where, for the second consecutive year, they lost to Cal State Bakersfield in the first round.

On March 29, the school fired head coach Trent Johnson. On April 15, the school named Andy Newman, head coach of Division II Cal State San Bernardino, the team's new head coach.

== Previous season ==
The Matadors finished the 2021–22 season 7–23, 3–13 in Big West play, to finish in eighth place. In the Big West tournament, they were defeated by Cal State Bakersfield in the first round.

== Roster ==
2022–23 Cal State Northridge Matadors men's basketball team
Players
Coaches

Pos.	#	Name	Height	Weight	Year	Previous school	Hometown
G	0	Dionte Bostick	6 ft 2 in (1.88 m)	185 lb (84 kg)	So	Murray State	Clearwater, FL
G	1	John III Wade	6 ft 5 in (1.96 m)	175 lb (79 kg)	Jr	Contra Costa College	Oakland, CA
G	2	Nick Herrmann	6 ft 2 in (1.88 m)	175 lb (79 kg)	RS Fr	Torrey Pines High School	San Diego, CA
G	3	Cam Slaymaker	6 ft 4 in (1.93 m)	180 lb (82 kg)	Fr	London Basketball Academy	Coquitlam, BC
F	4	Johnnie Walter	6 ft 9 in (2.06 m)	210 lb (95 kg)	Fr	Hotchkiss School	Westlake Village, CA
G	5	Atin Wright	6 ft 1 in (1.85 m)	185 lb (84 kg)	So	Fairmont Prep	Lakewood, CA
G	11	Christopher Carter	6 ft 4 in (1.93 m)	180 lb (82 kg)	Fr	Shadow Hills High School	Indio, CA
G	12	Marcel Stevens	6 ft 2 in (1.88 m)	185 lb (84 kg)	So	Impact Academy	Beverly Hills, CA
F	13	Onyi Eyisi	6 ft 9 in (2.06 m)	225 lb (102 kg)	Sr	Fordham	Lagos, Nigeria
G	21	Ethan Igbanugo	6 ft 2 in (1.88 m)	180 lb (82 kg)	GS	North Dakota	Lakeville, MN
G	22	Arman Pezeshkian	5 ft 11 in (1.8 m)	170 lb (77 kg)	GS	Crescenta Valley High School	Glendale, CA
F	23	Adam Afifi	6 ft 9 in (2.06 m)	235 lb (107 kg)	Jr	West Valley College	San Jose, CA
F	24	Fidelis Okereke	6 ft 6 in (1.98 m)	260 lb (118 kg)	So	King/Drew High School	Carson, CA
G	25	De'Sean Allen-Eikens	6 ft 6 in (1.98 m)	215 lb (98 kg)	RS Jr	New Orleans	Williston, ND
F	34	Lamine Niang	6 ft 10 in (2.08 m)	225 lb (102 kg)	Fr	Central Ponte Christian Academy	Thiès, Senegal
F	35	Dearon Tucker	6 ft 10 in (2.08 m)	225 lb (102 kg)	Jr	Indiana State	Dallas, TX
C	45	Ben Starks	7 ft 0 in (2.13 m)	235 lb (107 kg)	Fr	San Clemente High School	San Clemente, CA

Head coach

- Trent Johnson (Boise State)

Assistant coach(es)

- Logan Baumann (Louisville)
- Terry Johnson (Stanislaus State)
- Chris Tifft (Nevada)

Legend

- (C) Team captain
- (S) Suspended
- (I) Ineligible
- (W) Walk-on
- Injured
- Current redshirt

Roster
Last update: January 12, 2023

== Schedule and results ==
Date time, TV	Rank^{#}	Opponent^{#}	Result	Record	Site (attendance) city, state
Non-conference regular season
November 7, 2022*; 7:00 p.m., ESPN+		La Sierra	W 90–55	1–0	Premier America Credit Union Arena (650); Northridge, CA
November 12, 2022*; 6:00 p.m., ESPN+		at Utah Tech	L 63–69	1–1	Burns Arena (2,297); St. George, UT
November 15, 2022*; 7:00 p.m., ESPN+		at California Baptist; SoCal Challenge campus-site game	L 55–62	1–2	CBU Events Center (2,602); Riverside, CA
November 21, 2022*; 12:00 p.m., FloHoops		vs. Tennessee State; SoCal Challenge Sand Division semifinals	L 73–74	1–3	The Pavilion at JSerra (321); San Juan Capistrano, CA
November 23, 2022*; 12:00 p.m., FloHoops		vs. Central Michigan; SoCal Challenge Sand Division third-place game	L 66–82	1–4	The Pavilion at JSerra (250); San Juan Capistrano, CA
November 29, 2022*; 6:00 p.m., MW Network		at Boise State	L 46–55	1–5	ExtraMile Arena (7,511); Boise, ID
December 4, 2022*; 2:00 p.m., ESPN+		Whittier	W 101–42	2–5	Premier America Credit Union Arena (404); Northridge, CA
December 7, 2022*; 7:00 p.m., MW Network		at Fresno State	L 56–65	2–6	Save Mart Center (3,008); Fresno, CA
December 10, 2022*; 7:00 p.m., ESPN+		Northern Colorado	L 63–70	2–7	Premier America Credit Union Arena (453); Northridge, CA
December 19, 2022*; 7:00 p.m., ESPN+		Idaho	L 73–76	2–8	Premier America Credit Union Arena (315); Northridge, CA
December 22, 2022*; 1:00 p.m., ESPN+		San Diego	W 83–78	3–8	Premier America Credit Union Arena (211); Northridge, CA
Big West regular season
December 29, 2022; 7:00 p.m., ESPN+		at Cal Poly	L 57–67	3–9 (0–1)	Mott Athletics Center (1,523); San Luis Obispo, CA
December 31, 2022; 4:00 p.m., ESPN+		at Cal State Fullerton	L 52–64	3–10 (0–2)	Titan Gym (563); Fullerton, CA
January 5, 2023; 7:00 p.m., ESPN+		Long Beach State	L 74–84	3–11 (0–3)	Premier America Credit Union Arena (348); Northridge, CA
January 7, 2023; 5:00 p.m., ESPN+		at UC Riverside	L 45–68	3–12 (0–4)	SRC Arena (278); Riverside, CA
January 11, 2023; 7:00 p.m., ESPN+		UC Davis	L 54–62	3–13 (0–5)	Premier America Credit Union Arena (317); Northridge, CA
January 14, 2023; 1:00 p.m., Spectrum SportsNet		UC Irvine	L 57–71	3–14 (0–6)	Premier America Credit Union Arena (227); Northridge, CA
January 16, 2023; 7:00 p.m., ESPN+		at Hawaii	L 51–58	3–15 (0–7)	Stan Sheriff Center (4,329); Honolulu, HI
January 19, 2023; 7:00 p.m., ESPN+		at UC Santa Barbara	L 52–72	3–16 (0–8)	The Thunderdome (1,472); Santa Barbara, CA
January 21, 2023; 7:00 p.m., ESPN+		Cal State Fullerton	W 69–66 ^{OT}	4–16 (1–8)	Premier America Credit Union Arena (813); Northridge, CA
January 26, 2023; 7:00 p.m., ESPN+		UC San Diego	L 57–65	4–17 (1–9)	Premier America Credit Union Arena (305); Northridge, CA
January 28, 2023; 6:00 p.m., ESPN+		at UC Irvine	L 56–81	4–18 (1–10)	Bren Events Center (2,649); Irvine, CA
February 4, 2023; 7:00 p.m., ESPN+		UC Santa Barbara	W 72–67	5–18 (2–10)	Premier America Credit Union Arena (522); Northridge, CA
February 9, 2023; 7:00 p.m., ESPN+		at Cal State Bakersfield	L 58–73	5–19 (2–11)	Icardo Center (1,402); Bakersfield, CA
February 11, 2023; 1:00 p.m., Spectrum SportsNet		Cal Poly	W 64–53	6–19 (3–11)	Premier America Credit Union Arena (241); Northridge, CA
February 15, 2023; 6:00 p.m., ESPN+		at UC Davis	L 62–73	6–20 (3–12)	University Credit Union Center (875); Davis, CA
February 18, 2023; 7:00 p.m., ESPN+		at UC San Diego	L 62–75	6–21 (3–13)	LionTree Arena (1,124); La Jolla, CA
February 20, 2023; 7:00 p.m., ESPN+		UC Riverside	L 76–96	6–22 (3–14)	Premier America Credit Union Arena (378); Northridge, CA
February 23, 2023; 7:00 p.m., ESPN+		Cal State Bakersfield	W 75–68	7–22 (4–14)	Premier America Credit Union Arena; Northridge, CA
February 25, 2023; 4:00 p.m., ESPN+		at Long Beach State	L 64–71	7–23 (4–15)	Walter Pyramid (1,597); Long Beach, CA
March 2, 2023; 7:00 p.m., ESPN+		Hawaii	L 55–81	7–24 (4–16)	Premier America Credit Union Arena (535); Northridge, CA
Big West tournament
March 7, 2023; 6:00 p.m., ESPN+	(9)	vs. (8) Cal State Bakersfield; First round	L 47–51	7–25	Dollar Loan Center; Henderson, NV
*Non-conference game. ^{#}Rankings from AP poll. (#) Tournament seedings in parentheses. All times are in Pacific.
