= 2022–23 UC San Diego Tritons men's basketball team =

American college basketball season

2022–23 UC San Diego Tritons men's basketball
- Conference: Big West Conference
- Record: 10–20 (5–13 Big West)
- Head coach: Eric Olen (10th season)
- Associate head coach: Clint Allard
- Assistant coaches: Nick Booker; Tom Tankelewicz
- Home arena: LionTree Arena

2022–23 Big West men's basketball standings
	Conf.				Overall
Team	W		L	PCT	W		L	PCT
UC Santa Barbara †	15	–	5	.750	27	–	8	.771
UC Irvine	15	–	5	.750	23	–	12	.657
UC Riverside	14	–	6	.700	22	–	12	.647
Cal State Fullerton	12	–	6	.667	20	–	13	.606
Hawai'i	13	–	7	.650	22	–	11	.667
UC Davis	11	–	8	.579	18	–	14	.563
Long Beach State	11	–	9	.550	17	–	16	.515
Cal State Bakersfield	6	–	14	.300	11	–	22	.333
UC San Diego*	5	–	13	.278	10	–	20	.333
Cal State Northridge	4	–	16	.200	7	–	25	.219
Cal Poly	1	–	18	.053	8	–	25	.242
† 2023 Big West tournament winner * ineligible for the 2023 NCAA tournament due to transition period

The 2022–23 UC San Diego Tritons men's basketball team represented the University of California, San Diego in the 2022–23 NCAA Division I men's basketball season. The Tritons, led by tenth-year head coach Eric Olen, played their home games at LionTree Arena in La Jolla, California as members of the Big West Conference.

The Tritons finished the season 10–20, 5–13 in Big West play, to finish in ninth place. The Tritons were ineligible for postseason tournaments, including the NCAA tournament, as they were in the third year of a four-year mandatory transition period to Division I.

== Previous season ==
The Tritons finished the 2021–22 season 13–16, 7–11 in Big West play, which would have put them in eighth place, but their conference games did not count on the records of the Tritons or any other member of the Big West, due to their four-year mandatory transition period to Division I.

== Roster ==
2022–23 UC San Diego Tritons men's basketball team
Players
Coaches

Pos.	#	Name	Height	Weight	Year	Previous school	Hometown
G	0	Roddie III Anderson	6 ft 2 in (1.88 m)	190 lb (86 kg)	Fr	Fountain Valley HS	Huntington Beach, CA
F	1	Jake Kosakowski	6 ft 6 in (1.98 m)	200 lb (91 kg)	RS Jr	Bosco Institute	Las Vegas, NV
G	2	Michael Jr. Pearson	5 ft 9 in (1.75 m)	160 lb (73 kg)	So	Modesto Christian School	Tracy, CA
F	3	Justin DeGraaf	6 ft 7 in (2.01 m)	210 lb (95 kg)	So	Bosco Institute	Hudsonville, MI
G	4	Bryce Pope	6 ft 3 in (1.91 m)	185 lb (84 kg)	RS Jr	Torrey Pines HS	San Diego, CA
F	5	Cade Pendleton	6 ft 10 in (2.08 m)	210 lb (95 kg)	Fr	East Hamilton HS	Chattanooga, TN
G	10	Camden McCormick	6 ft 3 in (1.91 m)	190 lb (86 kg)	Fr	Francis Parker School	San Diego, CA
G/F	15	Quin Patterson	6 ft 7 in (2.01 m)	205 lb (93 kg)	Fr	Mount Si HS	Snoqualmie, WA
G	20	Vuk Vulikic	6 ft 5 in (1.96 m)	205 lb (93 kg)	Jr	UTEP	Belgrade, Serbia
G	22	Jace Roquemore	6 ft 5 in (1.96 m)	170 lb (77 kg)	RS Jr	Foothill HS	Henderson, NV
C	25	Emmanuel Tshimanga	7 ft 0 in (2.13 m)	270 lb (122 kg)	RS Jr	UC Irvine	Montreal, QC
F	33	J'Raan Brooks	6 ft 9 in (2.06 m)	215 lb (98 kg)	Sr	Washington	Seattle, WA
F	35	Francis Nwaokorie	6 ft 7 in (2.01 m)	220 lb (100 kg)	So	Champlin Park HS	Brooklyn Park, MN
F	43	Fallou Cisse	6 ft 7 in (2.01 m)	216 lb (98 kg)	RS Fr	Prolific Prep	Thiès, Senegal

Head coach

- Eric Olen (Spring Hill)

Assistant coach(es)

- Clint Allard (UC San Diego)
- Nick Booker (Davidson)
- Tom Tankelewicz (Western Carolina)

Legend

- (C) Team captain
- (S) Suspended
- (I) Ineligible
- (W) Walk-on
- Injured
- Current redshirt

Roster
Last update: January 16, 2023

== Schedule and results ==
Date time, TV	Rank^{#}	Opponent^{#}	Result	Record	Site (attendance) city, state
Non-conference regular season
November 7, 2022*; 7:00 p.m., ESPN+		Seattle	L 71–85	0–1	LionTree Arena (1,386); La Jolla, CA
November 12, 2022*; 7:00 p.m., ESPN+		Sacramento State	L 55–65	0–2	LionTree Arena (2,259); La Jolla, CA
November 15, 2022*; 7:00 p.m., ESPN+		California	W 64–62	1–2	LionTree Arena (3,071); La Jolla, CA
November 18, 2022*; 4:00 p.m., ESPN+		at Navy	L 69–78 ^{OT}	1–3	Alumni Hall (688); Annapolis, MD
November 19, 2022*; 3:00 p.m., ESPN+		vs. Youngstown State	L 54–73	1–4	Alumni Hall (124); Annapolis, MD
November 22, 2022*; 4:00 p.m., ESPN+		at George Washington	W 75–70	2–4	Charles E. Smith Center (841); Washington, D.C.
November 27, 2022*; 11:00 a.m., ESPN+		at Eastern Michigan	W 66–63	3–4	George Gervin GameAbove Center (2,340); Ypsilanti, MI
December 1, 2022*; 7:00 p.m., WCC Network		at San Diego	Postponed due to a facility conflict		Jenny Craig Pavilion; San Diego, CA
December 2, 2022*; 7:00 p.m., ESPN+		Bethesda	W 81–76	4–4	LionTree Arena (541); La Jolla, CA
December 12, 2022*; 7:00 p.m., WCC Network		at San Diego; Rescheduled from December 1	L 58–84	4–5	Jenny Craig Pavilion (934); San Diego, CA
December 14, 2022*; 7:00 p.m., MW Network		at Nevada	L 56–64	4–6	Lawlor Events Center (6,693); Reno, NV
December 17, 2022*; 2:00 p.m., ESPN+		Occidental	W 91–55	5–6	LionTree Arena (737); La Jolla, CA
December 20, 2022*; 7:30 p.m., FS1		at San Diego State	L 46–62	5–7	Viejas Arena (12,414); San Diego, CA
Big West regular season
December 29, 2022; 7:00 p.m., ESPN+		at Long Beach State	W 85–83 ^{OT}	6–7 (1–0)	Walter Pyramid (1,426); Long Beach, CA
December 31, 2022; 4:00 p.m., ESPN+		at UC Santa Barbara	L 61–82	6–8 (1–1)	The Thunderdome (1,063); Santa Barbara, CA
January 5, 2023; 7:00 p.m., ESPN+		Hawaii	L 49–62	6–9 (1–2)	LionTree Arena (976); La Jolla, CA
January 11, 2023; 7:00 p.m., ESPN+		UC Riverside	L 68–74	6–10 (1–3)	LionTree Arena (1,813); La Jolla, CA
January 14, 2023; 2:00 p.m., ESPN+		at Cal State Bakersfield	L 52–56	6–11 (1–4)	Icardo Center (932); Bakersfield, CA
January 16, 2023; 3:00 p.m., ESPN+		UC Davis	L 70–78	6–12 (1–5)	LionTree Arena (1,284); La Jolla, CA
January 19, 2023; 7:00 p.m., ESPN+		at Cal Poly	W 71–64	7–12 (2–5)	Mott Athletics Center (2,283); San Luis Obispo, CA
January 21, 2023; 3:00 p.m., Spectrum SportsNet/ESPN+		Long Beach State	L 110–112 ^{3OT}	7–13 (2–6)	LionTree Arena (1,039); La Jolla, CA
January 26, 2023; 7:00 p.m., ESPN+		at Cal State Northridge	W 65–57	8–13 (3–6)	Premier America Credit Union Arena (305); Northridge, CA
January 28, 2023; 8:00 p.m., Spectrum SportsNet/ESPN+		at UC Riverside	L 65–72	8–14 (3–7)	SRC Arena (359); Riverside, CA
February 2, 2023; 7:00 p.m., ESPN+		UC Irvine	L 60–76	8–15 (3–8)	LionTree Arena (2,812); La Jolla, CA
February 4, 2023; 7:00 p.m., ESPN+		Cal State Bakersfield	L 69–75 ^{OT}	8–16 (3–9)	LionTree Arena (808); La Jolla, CA
February 9, 2023; 9:00 p.m., Spectrum Sports/ESPN+		at Hawaii	L 62–69	8–17 (3–10)	Stan Sheriff Center (4,529); Honolulu, HI
February 15, 2023; 7:00 p.m., ESPN+		Cal State Fullerton	L 73–76	8–18 (3–11)	LionTree Arena (917); La Jolla, CA
February 18, 2023; 7:00 p.m., ESPN+		Cal State Northridge	W 75–62	9–18 (4–11)	LionTree Arena (1,124); La Jolla, CA
February 20, 2023; 3:00 p.m., ESPN+		at UC Davis	L 66–76	9–19 (4–12)	University Credit Union Center (1,688); Davis, CA
February 23, 2023; 7:00 p.m., ESPN+		at UC Irvine	W 99–91	10–19 (5–12)	Bren Events Center (2,339); Irvine, CA
February 25, 2023; 7:00 p.m., ESPN+		UC Santa Barbara	L 71–87	10–20 (5–13)	LionTree Arena (1,489); La Jolla, CA
March 2, 2023; 7:00 p.m., ESPN+		Cal Poly	Canceled		LionTree Arena; La Jolla, CA
March 4, 2023; 6:00 p.m., ESPN+		at Cal State Fullerton	Canceled		Titan Gym; Fullerton, CA
*Non-conference game. ^{#}Rankings from AP poll. (#) Tournament seedings in parentheses. All times are in Pacific.
