= 2022–23 Cal State Fullerton Titans men's basketball team =

American college basketball team season

2022–23 Cal State Fullerton Titans men's basketball
- Conference: Big West Conference
- Record: 20–13 (12–6 Big West)
- Head coach: Dedrique Taylor (10th season)
- Assistant coaches: Chris Walker; Joey Brooks; Anthony Santos
- Home arena: Titan Gym (Capacity: 4,000)

2022–23 Big West men's basketball standings
| | Conf. | | | | Overall |
| Team | W | | L | PCT | W | | L | PCT |
|---|---|---|---|---|---|---|---|---|
| UC Santa Barbara † | 15 | – | 5 | .750 | 27 | – | 8 | .771 |
| UC Irvine | 15 | – | 5 | .750 | 23 | – | 12 | .657 |
| UC Riverside | 14 | – | 6 | .700 | 22 | – | 12 | .647 |
| Cal State Fullerton | 12 | – | 6 | .667 | 20 | – | 13 | .606 |
| Hawai'i | 13 | – | 7 | .650 | 22 | – | 11 | .667 |
| UC Davis | 11 | – | 8 | .579 | 18 | – | 14 | .563 |
| Long Beach State | 11 | – | 9 | .550 | 17 | – | 16 | .515 |
| Cal State Bakersfield | 6 | – | 14 | .300 | 11 | – | 22 | .333 |
| UC San Diego* | 5 | – | 13 | .278 | 10 | – | 20 | .333 |
| Cal State Northridge | 4 | – | 16 | .200 | 7 | – | 25 | .219 |
| Cal Poly | 1 | – | 18 | .053 | 8 | – | 25 | .242 |
† 2023 Big West tournament winner * ineligible for the 2023 NCAA tournament due to transition period

The 2022–23 Cal State Fullerton Titans men's basketball team represented California State University, Fullerton in the 2022–23 NCAA Division I men's basketball season. The Titans, led by 10th-year head coach Dedrique Taylor, played their home games at Titan Gym as members of the Big West Conference.

== Previous season ==
The Titans finished the 2021–22 season 21–11 overall, 11–4 in Big West play to finish in second place. The Titans won the Big West tournament championship by defeating UC Davis, Hawaii, and Long Beach State. As a result, the Titans received the conference's automatic bid to the NCAA tournament as the No. 15 seed in the West region. They lost to No. 2-seeded Duke in the first round.

== Roster ==
2022–23 Cal State Fullerton Titans men's basketball team
Players
Coaches

| Pos. | # | Name | Height | Weight | Year | Previous school | Hometown |
|---|---|---|---|---|---|---|---|
| G | 0 | Jalen Harris | 6 ft 1 in (1.85 m) | 180 lb (82 kg) | Sr | Casper College | Los Angeles, CA |
| G | 1 | Daeshawn Eaton | 6 ft 2 in (1.88 m) | 160 lb (73 kg) | Jr | Howard CC | Columbia, MD |
| G | 2 | Max Jones | 6 ft 5 in (1.96 m) | 206 lb (93 kg) | Jr | Tampa | Clearwater, FL |
| G | 3 | Latrell Wrightsell Jr. | 6 ft 3 in (1.91 m) | 189 lb (86 kg) | Jr | Omaha Central HS | Omaha, NE |
| F | 5 | Victor Panov | 6 ft 7 in (2.01 m) | 230 lb (104 kg) | Fr | DME Academy | Saint Petersburg, Russia |
| F | 10 | Ibrahim Famouke Doumbia | 6 ft 7 in (2.01 m) | 205 lb (93 kg) | Sr | UCF | Bamako, Mali |
| G | 11 | Trey Blackmore | 6 ft 2 in (1.88 m) | 165 lb (75 kg) | Fr | Robert G. Cole HS | San Antonio, TX |
| F | 12 | Jayden White | 6 ft 7 in (2.01 m) | 200 lb (91 kg) | Fr | Mission Hills HS | San Marcos, CA |
| F | 13 | Vincent Lee | 6 ft 8 in (2.03 m) | 230 lb (104 kg) | Sr | Nevada | Midlothian, TX |
| F | 14 | Lathaniel Bastian | 6 ft 8 in (2.03 m) | 225 lb (102 kg) | So | Angelo State | Nassau, Bahamas |
| G | 21 | Grayson Carper | 6 ft 6 in (1.98 m) | 190 lb (86 kg) | Sr | Columbia College | Fresno, CA |
| F | 22 | Garrison Wade | 6 ft 7 in (2.01 m) | 215 lb (98 kg) | Sr | Dartmouth | Madison, MS |
| G | 23 | Tory San Antonio | 6 ft 3 in (1.91 m) | 165 lb (75 kg) | Sr | Rancho Verde HS | Moreno Valley, CA |
| F | 24 | Justin White | 6 ft 5 in (1.96 m) | 205 lb (93 kg) | Fr | Mission Hills HS | San Marcos, CA |
| F | 32 | John Mikey Square | 6 ft 6 in (1.98 m) | 210 lb (95 kg) | Jr | Fairleigh Dickinson | Washington, D.C. |
| G | 35 | Cameron Carter | 6 ft 2 in (1.88 m) | 180 lb (82 kg) | Sr | Damonte Ranch HS | Reno, NV |

Head coach

- Dedrique Taylor (UC Davis)

Assistant coach(es)

- Chris Walker (Oklahoma)
- Anthony Santos (Cal State Fullerton)
- Joey Brooks (Notre Dame)

Legend

- (C) Team captain
- (S) Suspended
- (I) Ineligible
- (W) Walk-on
- Injured
- Current redshirt

Roster
Last update: November 17, 2022

== Schedule and results ==
| Date time, TV | Rank^{#} | Opponent^{#} | Result | Record | High points | High rebounds | High assists | Site (attendance) city, state |
Exhibition
| October 29, 2022* | | La Verne | W 92–51 | | 15 – Harris | 7 – Carper | 3 – Wrightsell Jr. | Titan Gym (411); Fullerton, CA |
Non-conference regular season
| November 7, 2022*; 7:00 p.m., YurView | | at No. 19 San Diego State | L 50–87 | 0–1 | 11 – Lee | 7 – Wade | 2 – Lee | Viejas Arena (11,934); San Diego, CA |
| November 11, 2022*; 7:00 p.m., ESPN+ | | Pepperdine | W 74–71 | 1–1 | 27 – Harris | 9 – Lee | 5 – Wrightsell Jr. | Titan Gym (1,140); Fullerton, CA |
| November 13, 2022*; 5:00 p.m., ESPN+ | | Vermont | W 94–85 ^{2OT} | 2–1 | 21 – San Antonio | 8 – Wrightsell Jr. | 9 – Wrightsell Jr. | Titan Gym (900); Fullerton, CA |
| November 18, 2022*; 7:00 p.m. | | at Pacific | W 94–91 ^{2OT} | 3–1 | 27 – Wrightsell Jr. | 9 – Lee | 3 – Wrightsell Jr. | Alex G. Spanos Center (1,496); Stockton, CA |
| November 22, 2022*; 7:00 p.m., ESPN+ | | Westcliff | W 78–57 | 4–1 | 13 – Carper | 7 – Carper | 6 – Wrightsell Jr. | Titan Gym (719); Fullerton, CA |
| November 26, 2022*; 12:00 p.m. | | vs. Utah Tech; North Dakota Tournament | L 60–66 | 4–2 | 21 – Wrightsell Jr. | 5 – Tied | 2 – Tied | Betty Engelstad Sioux Center (71); Grand Forks, ND |
| November 27, 2022*; 12:00 p.m., ESPN+ | | at North Dakota; North Dakota Tournament | L 57–73 | 4–3 | 15 – Harris | 4 – Tied | 2 – Wrightsell Jr. | Betty Engelstad Sioux Center (1,199); Grand Forks, ND |
| November 30, 2022*; 7:00 p.m., ESPN+ | | at Seattle | L 62–69 | 4–4 | 16 – Jones | 8 – Bastian | 5 – Harris | Climate Pledge Arena (1,277); Seattle, WA |
| December 7, 2022*; 8:00 p.m., P12N | | at USC | L 50–64 | 4–5 | 17 – Wrightsell Jr. | 8 – San Antonio | 4 – Harris | Galen Center (1,531); Los Angeles, CA |
| December 10, 2022*; 4:00 p.m. | | vs. Southern Utah; Jack Jones Hoopfest | L 60–67 | 4–6 | 20 – Wrightsell Jr. | 6 – Jones | 5 – Tied | Michelob Ultra Arena; Las Vegas, NV |
| December 19, 2022*; 7:00 p.m., ESPN+ | | San Diego Christian | W 87–35 | 5–6 | 20 – Wrightsell Jr. | 7 – Lee | 6 – Harris | Titan Gym (478); Fullerton, CA |
| December 21, 2022*; 6:00 p.m., ESPN+ | | Sacramento State | W 59–49 | 6–6 | 19 – Harris | 5 – Tied | 4 – Harris | Titan Gym (538); Fullerton, CA |
Big West regular season
| December 29, 2022; 7:00 p.m., ESPN+ | | UC Santa Barbara | L 58–66 | 6–7 (0–1) | 19 – Harris | 10 – Lee | 2 – Tied | Titan Gym (965); Fullerton, CA |
| December 31, 2022; 4:00 p.m. | | CSUN | W 64–52 | 7–7 (1–1) | 19 – Wrightsell Jr. | 10 – Wrightsell Jr. | 4 – San Antonio | Titan Gym (563); Fullerton, CA |
| January 5, 2023; 7:00 p.m., ESPN+ | | at UC Riverside | W 77–62 | 8–7 (2–1) | 29 – Wrightsell Jr. | 4 – Tied | 3 – Harris | SRC Arena; Riverside, CA |
| January 7, 2023; 6:00 p.m. | | Hawaii | W 79–72 ^{OT} | 9–7 (3–1) | 24 – Harris | 7 – San Antonio | 1 – Tied | Titan Gym (823); Fullerton, CA |
| January 11, 2023; 7:00 p.m., ESPN+ | | at UC Irvine | L 65–70 | 9–8 (3–2) | 17 – San Antonio | 8 – Lee | 6 – Wrightsell Jr. | Bren Events Center (1,891); Irvine, CA |
| January 14, 2023; 2:00 p.m., ESPN+ | | at UC Davis | L 79–83 | 9–9 (3–3) | 19 – Harris | 12 – San Antonio | 5 – Harris | University Credit Union Center (1,247); Davis, CA |
| January 16, 2023; 7:00 p.m. | | Cal State Bakersfield | W 76–46 | 10–9 (4–3) | 18 – Wrightsell Jr. | 5 – Tied | 4 – Tied | Titan Gym (501); Fullerton, CA |
| January 19, 2023; 7:00 p.m., ESPN+ | | at Long Beach State | L 67–72 | 10–10 (4–4) | 18 – Harris | 5 – Tied | 5 – Jones | Walter Pyramid (2,354); Long Beach, CA |
| January 21, 2023; 7:00 p.m. | | at CSUN | L 66–69 ^{OT} | 10–11 (4–5) | 18 – Jones | 6 – Tied | 3 – Jones | Premier America Credit Union Arena (813); Northridge, CA |
| January 26, 2023; 7:00 p.m., ESPN+ | | UC Irvine | W 62–61 | 11–11 (5–5) | 26 – Wrightsell Jr. | 7 – Lee | 4 – Jones | Titan Gym (1,219); Fullerton, CA |
| January 28, 2023; 7:00 p.m., ESPN+ | | at Cal Poly | W 65–36 | 12–11 (6–5) | 16 – Jones | 5 – Tied | 3 – Tied | Mott Athletics Center (1,921); San Luis Obispo, CA |
| February 2, 2023; 7:00 p.m. | | Long Beach State | L 67–70 | 12–12 (6–6) | 19 – Jones | 7 – Lee | 2 – Tied | Titan Gym (2,445); Fullerton, CA |
| February 4, 2023; 6:00 p.m. | | UC Riverside | W 64–58 | 13–12 (7–6) | 16 – Tied | 7 – Lee | 2 – Tied | Titan Gym (1,082); Fullerton, CA |
| February 11, 2023; 9:00 p.m. | | at Hawaii | W 52–51 | 14–12 (8–6) | 13 – Jones | 9 – San Antonio | 1 – Tied | Stan Sheriff Center (5,217); Honolulu, HI |
| February 15, 2023; 7:00 p.m., ESPN+ | | at UC San Diego | W 76–73 | 15–12 (9–6) | 25 – Wrightsell Jr. | 7 – Square | 4 – Jones | LionTree Arena (917); La Jolla, CA |
| February 18, 2023; 4:00 p.m. | | Cal Poly | W 83–62 | 16–12 (10–6) | 23 – Wrightsell Jr. | 8 – Carper | 2 – Tied | Titan Gym (690); Fullerton, CA |
| February 20, 2023; 7:00 p.m. | | at UC Santa Barbara | W 74–60 | 17–12 (11–6) | 18 – Jones | 7 – Square | 4 – Tied | The Thunderdome (1,972); Santa Barbara, CA |
| February 23, 2023; 7:00 p.m. | | UC Davis | Canceled | | | | | Titan Gym; Fullerton, CA |
| February 25, 2023; 7:00 p.m. | | at Cal State Bakersfield | W 70–66 ^{OT} | 18–12 (12–6) | 17 – Jones | 6 – Wrightsell Jr. | 5 – San Antonio | Icardo Center (1,027); Bakersfield, CA |
| March 4, 2023; 6:00 p.m. | | UC San Diego | Canceled | | | | | Titan Gym; Fullerton, CA |
Big West tournament
| March 9, 2023; 2:30 pm, ESPN+ | (4) | vs. (5) Hawai'i; Quarterfinals | W 62–60 ^{OT} | 19–12 | 18 – Jones | 10 – Wrightsell Jr. | 3 – Jones | Dollar Loan Center (1,410); Henderson, NV |
| March 10, 2023; 6:00 pm, ESPN+ | (4) | vs. (1) UC Irvine; Semifinals | W 83–80 | 20–12 | 22 – Wrightsell Jr. | 6 – Lee | 4 – Jones | Dollar Loan Center; Henderson, NV |
| March 11, 2023; 6:30 pm, ESPN2 | (4) | vs. (2) UC Santa Barbara; Championship | L 62–72 | 20–13 | 18 – Jones | 9 – San Antonio | 2 – San Antonio | Dollar Loan Center (1,897); Henderson, NV |
*Non-conference game. ^{#}Rankings from AP Poll. (#) Tournament seedings in parentheses. All times are in Pacific Time Zone.
