= 2022–23 Cal Poly Mustangs men's basketball team =

American college basketball season

2022–23 Cal Poly Mustangs men's basketball
- Conference: Big West Conference
- Record: 8–25 (1–18 Big West)
- Head coach: John Smith (4th season)
- Associate head coach: Omar Lowery
- Assistant coaches: Keith Berard; Darren French
- Home arena: Mott Athletics Center (Capacity: 3,032)

2022–23 Big West men's basketball standings
| | Conf. | | | | Overall |
| Team | W | | L | PCT | W | | L | PCT |
|---|---|---|---|---|---|---|---|---|
| UC Santa Barbara † | 15 | – | 5 | .750 | 27 | – | 8 | .771 |
| UC Irvine | 15 | – | 5 | .750 | 23 | – | 12 | .657 |
| UC Riverside | 14 | – | 6 | .700 | 22 | – | 12 | .647 |
| Cal State Fullerton | 12 | – | 6 | .667 | 20 | – | 13 | .606 |
| Hawai'i | 13 | – | 7 | .650 | 22 | – | 11 | .667 |
| UC Davis | 11 | – | 8 | .579 | 18 | – | 14 | .563 |
| Long Beach State | 11 | – | 9 | .550 | 17 | – | 16 | .515 |
| Cal State Bakersfield | 6 | – | 14 | .300 | 11 | – | 22 | .333 |
| UC San Diego* | 5 | – | 13 | .278 | 10 | – | 20 | .333 |
| Cal State Northridge | 4 | – | 16 | .200 | 7 | – | 25 | .219 |
| Cal Poly | 1 | – | 18 | .053 | 8 | – | 25 | .242 |
† 2023 Big West tournament winner * ineligible for the 2023 NCAA tournament due to transition period

The 2022–23 Cal Poly Mustangs men's basketball team represented California Polytechnic State University in the 2022–23 NCAA Division I men's basketball season. The Mustangs, led by fourth-year head coach John Smith, played their home games at the Robert A. Mott Athletics Center in San Luis Obispo, California as members of the Big West Conference.

== Previous season ==
The Mustangs finished the 2021–22 season 7–21, 2–12 in Big West play, to finish in a tie for last place. They were defeated by UC Davis in the first round of the Big West tournament.

== Roster ==
2022–23 Cal Poly Mustangs men's basketball team
Players
Coaches

| Pos. | # | Name | Height | Weight | Year | Previous school | Hometown |
|---|---|---|---|---|---|---|---|
| PG | 0 | Hayden Jory | 5 ft 11 in (1.8 m) | 170 lb (77 kg) | So | Cabrillo HS | Lompoc, CA |
| PG | 1 | Camren Pierce | 5 ft 10 in (1.78 m) | 185 lb (84 kg) | Jr | Etiwanda HS | Rancho Cucamonga, CA |
| G | 2 | Trevon Taylor | 6 ft 6 in (1.98 m) | 210 lb (95 kg) | Sr | James Madison | Chesapeake, VA |
| G | 3 | Kobe Sanders | 6 ft 6 in (1.98 m) | 175 lb (79 kg) | Jr | Christian HS | San Diego, CA |
| G | 4 | Brantly Stevenson | 6 ft 4 in (1.93 m) | 185 lb (84 kg) | Jr | Etiwanda HS | Rancho Cucamonga, CA |
| G | 5 | Julien Franklin | 6 ft 7 in (2.01 m) | 200 lb (91 kg) | So | Oregon State | Brea, CA |
| G | 10 | Isaac Spears | 6 ft 4 in (1.93 m) | 170 lb (77 kg) | So | Montana State | Las Vegas, NV |
| SG | 11 | Aidan Prukop | 6 ft 4 in (1.93 m) | 180 lb (82 kg) | RS So | Mater Dei HS | Ladera Ranch, CA |
| PG | 12 | Nick Fleming | 6 ft 1 in (1.85 m) | 165 lb (75 kg) | GS | Southern Utah | Atlanta, GA |
| G | 13 | Nick Carlson | 6 ft 0 in (1.83 m) | 185 lb (84 kg) | Jr | Helix HS | La Mesa, CA |
| F/C | 15 | Alimamy Koroma | 6 ft 8 in (2.03 m) | 220 lb (100 kg) | Sr | Prolific Prep Academy | Freetown, Sierra Leone |
| F | 21 | Cole Haller | 6 ft 7 in (2.01 m) | 185 lb (84 kg) | Fr | Newport HS | Bellevue, WA |
| PF | 22 | Aaron Jr. Price | 6 ft 8 in (2.03 m) | 195 lb (88 kg) | Fr | Liberty HS | Las Vegas, NV |
| C | 23 | Bryan Penn-Johnson | 7 ft 1 in (2.16 m) | 235 lb (107 kg) | Jr | East Los Angeles | Long Beach, CA |
| G | 25 | Noah Pick | 5 ft 10 in (1.78 m) | 170 lb (77 kg) | Fr | Sunrise Christian Academy | Arroyo Grande, CA |
| SF | 31 | Chance Hunter | 6 ft 6 in (1.98 m) | 200 lb (91 kg) | GS | California Baptist | Inglewood, CA |
| C | 35 | Matur Dhal | 6 ft 11 in (2.11 m) | 195 lb (88 kg) | So | PHH Prep | Tempe, AZ |

Head coach

- John Smith (Dominican (CA))

Assistant coach(es)

- Omar Lowery (Concordia (WI))
- Keith Berard (Southern Utah)
- Darren French (Cal State San Bernardino)

Legend

- (C) Team captain
- (S) Suspended
- (I) Ineligible
- (W) Walk-on
- Injured
- Current redshirt

Roster
Last update: January 10, 2023

== Schedule and results ==
| Date time, TV | Rank^{#} | Opponent^{#} | Result | Record | High points | High rebounds | High assists | Site (attendance) city, state |
Exhibition
| November 3, 2022*; 7:00 p.m. | | Cal State Los Angeles | W 72–60 | – | 15 – Koroma | 10 – Koroma | 5 – Hunter | Mott Athletics Center (432); San Luis Obispo, CA |
Non-conference regular season
| November 7, 2022*; 7:00 p.m., ESPN+ | | Bethesda | W 94–59 | 1–0 | 16 – Stevenson | 7 – 2 tied | 5 – Sanders | Mott Athletics Center (1,156); San Luis Obispo, CA |
| November 10, 2022*; 7:00 p.m., WCC Network | | at San Francisco | L 48–60 | 1–1 | 15 – Koroma | 8 – Koroma | 1 – Franklin | War Memorial Gymnasium (847); San Francisco, CA |
| November 18, 2022*; 8:00 p.m., P12N | | at Stanford | L 43–80 | 1–2 | 12 – Taylor | 6 – Taylor | 2 – Prukop | Maples Pavilion (2,263); Stanford, CA |
| November 20, 2022*; 7:00 p.m., ESPN+ | | Mount St. Mary's; California Thanksgiving Jam | L 68–73 | 1–3 | 18 – Hunter | 10 – Taylor | 5 – Pierce | Mott Athletics Center (1,057); San Luis Obispo, CA |
| November 23, 2022*; 4:00 p.m., ESPN+ | | Idaho; California Thanksgiving Jam | W 82–71 | 2–3 | 23 – Koroma | 4 – 2 tied | 4 – Pierce | Mott Athletics Center (1,174); San Luis Obispo, CA |
| November 28, 2022*; 7:00 p.m., WCC Network | | at Pacific | W 62–58 | 3–3 | 23 – Stevenson | 8 – Stevenson | 2 – 3 tied | Alex G. Spanos Center (800); Stockton, CA |
| November 30, 2022*; 7:00 p.m., WCC Network | | at Pepperdine | Canceled due to health and safety protocols | | | | | Firestone Fieldhouse; Malibu, CA |
| December 3, 2022*; 6:00 p.m., ESPN+ | | California Baptist | W 64–53 | 4–3 | 19 – Koroma | 8 – Stevenson | 4 – Stevenson | Mott Athletics Center (2,284); San Luis Obispo, CA |
| December 10, 2022*; 7:00 p.m., ESPN+ | | Portland State | W 72–49 | 5–3 | 20 – Stevenson | 7 – Taylor | 5 – Pierce | Mott Athletics Center (1,682); San Luis Obispo, CA |
| December 13, 2022*; 7:30 p.m., P12N | | at Washington | L 68–74 | 5–4 | 13 – 2 tied | 8 – Taylor | 4 – 2 tied | Alaska Airlines Arena (4,888); Seattle, WA |
| December 16, 2022*; 7:00 p.m., ESPN+ | | Weber State | L 45–74 | 5–5 | 11 – Koroma | 6 – Stevenson | 3 – Pierce | Mott Athletics Center (1,329); San Luis Obispo, CA |
| December 20, 2022*; 7:00 p.m., MW Network | | at San Jose State | L 43–65 | 5–6 | 9 – Taylor | 5 – Koroma | 3 – Fleming | Provident Credit Union Event Center (1,233); San Jose, CA |
| December 22, 2022*; 4:00 p.m. | | San Diego Christian | W 72–59 | 6–6 | 12 – Hunter | 4 – 5 tied | 4 – Prukop | Mott Athletics Center (376); San Luis Obispo, CA |
Big West regular season
| December 29, 2022; 7:00 p.m., ESPN+ | | Cal State Northridge | W 67–57 | 7–6 (1–0) | 17 – Sanders | 9 – Taylor | 3 – 2 tied | Mott Athletics Center (1,523); San Luis Obispo, CA |
| December 31, 2022; 7:00 p.m., ESPN+ | | at Hawaii | L 48–57 | 7–7 (1–1) | 10 – 2 tied | 6 – Koroma | 2 – Stevenson | Stan Sheriff Center (4,260); Honolulu, HI |
| January 5, 2023; 7:00 p.m., ESPN+ | | at Cal State Bakersfield | L 51–61 | 7–8 (1–2) | 14 – Sanders | 5 – Sanders | 2 – 2 tied | Icardo Center (1,326); Bakersfield, CA |
| January 7, 2023; 1:00 p.m., Spectrum SportsNet | | UC Santa Barbara; Rivalry | L 57–62 | 7–9 (1–3) | 19 – Hunter | 6 – Koroma | 4 – 3 tied | Mott Athletics Center (1,882); San Luis Obispo, CA |
| January 12, 2023; 7:00 p.m., ESPN+ | | at Long Beach State | L 58–77 | 7–10 (1–4) | 13 – Taylor | 6 – Taylor | 2 – 3 tied | Walter Pyramid (1,213); Long Beach, CA |
| January 16, 2023; 5:00 p.m., ESPN+ | | at UC Riverside | L 78–83 ^{OT} | 7–11 (1–5) | 21 – Taylor | 6 – 2 tied | 6 – Sanders | SRC Arena (857); Riverside, CA |
| January 19, 2023; 7:00 p.m., ESPN+ | | UC San Diego | L 64–71 | 7–12 (1–6) | 20 – Stevenson | 7 – Taylor | 7 – tied | Mott Athletics Center (2,283); San Luis Obispo, CA |
| January 21, 2023; 3:00 p.m., ESPN+ | | at UC Davis | L 63–65 | 7–13 (1–7) | 14 – 2 tied | 6 – 2 tied | 3 – 2 tied | University Credit Union Center (1,780); Davis, CA |
| January 26, 2023; 7:00 p.m., ESPN+ | | Long Beach State | L 52–70 | 7–14 (1–8) | 13 – Stevenson | 11 – Taylor | 2 – tied | Mott Athletics Center (1,928); San Luis Obispo, CA |
| January 28, 2023; 7:00 p.m., ESPN+ | | Cal State Fullerton | L 36–65 | 7–15 (1–9) | 13 – Stevenson | 6 – Taylor | 1 – tied | Mott Athletics Center (1,921); San Luis Obispo, CA |
| February 2, 2023; 7:00 p.m., ESPN+ | | at UC Santa Barbara; Rivalry | L 62–68 | 7–16 (1–10) | 13 – Koroma | 8 – Koroma | 4 – Taylor | The Thunderdome (3,942); Santa Barbara, CA |
| February 4, 2023; 7:00 p.m., ESPN+ | | Hawaii | L 56–69 | 7–17 (1–11) | 17 – Koroma | 5 – Taylor | 2 – tied | Mott Athletics Center (2,412); San Luis Obispo, CA |
| February 9, 2023; 7:00 p.m., ESPN+ | | at UC Irvine | L 54–55 | 7–18 (1–12) | 13 – Hunter | 8 – Stevenson | 2 – tied | Bren Events Center (1,622); Irvine, CA |
| February 11, 2023; 7:00 p.m., ESPN+ | | at Cal State Northridge | L 53–64 | 7–19 (1–13) | 14 – Stevenson | 4 – tied | 3 – Sanders | Premier America Credit Union Arena (241); Northridge, CA |
| February 15, 2023; 7:00 p.m., ESPN+ | | Cal State Bakersfield | L 62–70 | 7–20 (1–14) | 23 – Hunter | 13 – Hunter | 3 – Franklin | Mott Athletics Center (1,322); San Luis Obispo, CA |
| February 18, 2023; 4:00 p.m., ESPN+ | | at Cal State Fullerton | L 62–83 | 7–21 (1–15) | 17 – Stevenson | 4 – Taylor | 5 – Pierce | Titan Gym (690); Fullerton, CA |
| February 20, 2023; 7:00 p.m., ESPN+ | | UC Irvine | L 56–59 | 7–22 (1–16) | 15 – Koroma | 6 – tied | 3 – tied | Mott Athletics Center (1,674); San Luis Obispo, CA |
| February 25, 2023; 3:00 p.m., ESPN+ | | UC Davis | L 52–58 | 7–23 (1–17) | 13 – Stevenson | 6 – tied | 3 – tied | Mott Athletics Center (2,184); San Luis Obispo, CA |
| March 2, 2023; 7:00 p.m., ESPN+ | | at UC San Diego | Canceled | | | | | LionTree Arena; La Jolla, CA |
| March 4, 2023; 7:00 p.m., ESPN+ | | UC Riverside | L 72–73 ^{OT} | 7–24 (1–18) | 32 – Stevenson | 8 – Hunter | 4 – tied | Mott Athletics Center (2,282); San Luis Obispo, CA |
Big West tournament
| March 7, 2023; 8:30 p.m., ESPN+ | (10) | vs. (7) Long Beach State; First round | W 88–68 | 8–24 | 28 – Stevenson | 6 – tied | 5 – tied | Dollar Loan Center; Henderson, NV |
| March 9, 2023; 6:00 p.m., ESPN+ | (10) | vs. (2) UC Santa Barbara; Quarterfinals | L 54–64 | 8–25 | 18 – Stevenson | 7 – Franklin | 3 – Pierce | Dollar Loan Center; Henderson, NV |
*Non-conference game. ^{#}Rankings from AP poll. (#) Tournament seedings in parentheses. All times are in Pacific.
