= 2022–23 Cal State Bakersfield Roadrunners men's basketball team =

American college basketball season

2022–23 Cal State Bakersfield Roadrunners men's basketball
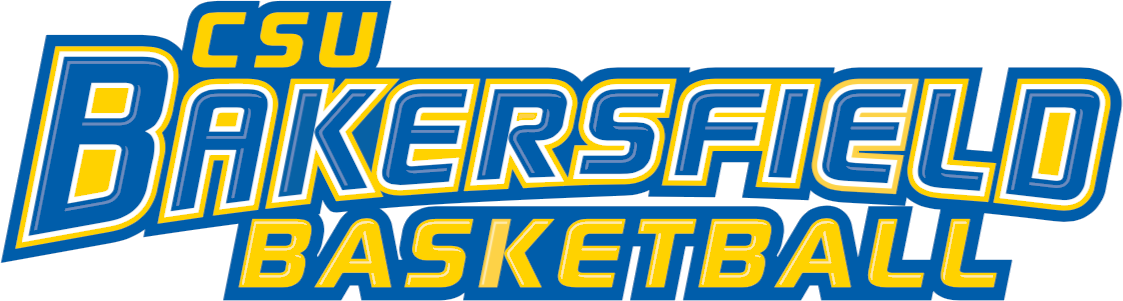
- Conference: Big West Conference
- Record: 11–22 (6–14 Big West)
- Head coach: Rod Barnes (12th season)
- Assistant coaches: Mike Scott (6th season); Brandon Barnes (4th season); Chris Crevelone (3rd season)
- Home arena: Icardo Center

2022–23 Big West men's basketball standings
	Conf.				Overall
Team	W		L	PCT	W		L	PCT
UC Santa Barbara †	15	–	5	.750	27	–	8	.771
UC Irvine	15	–	5	.750	23	–	12	.657
UC Riverside	14	–	6	.700	22	–	12	.647
Cal State Fullerton	12	–	6	.667	20	–	13	.606
Hawai'i	13	–	7	.650	22	–	11	.667
UC Davis	11	–	8	.579	18	–	14	.563
Long Beach State	11	–	9	.550	17	–	16	.515
Cal State Bakersfield	6	–	14	.300	11	–	22	.333
UC San Diego*	5	–	13	.278	10	–	20	.333
Cal State Northridge	4	–	16	.200	7	–	25	.219
Cal Poly	1	–	18	.053	8	–	25	.242
† 2023 Big West tournament winner * ineligible for the 2023 NCAA tournament due to transition period

The 2022–23 Cal State Bakersfield Roadrunners men's basketball team represented California State University, Bakersfield in the 2022–23 NCAA Division I men's basketball season. The Roadrunners, led by 12th-year head coach Rod Barnes, played their home games at Icardo Center in Bakersfield, California as members of the Big West Conference.

The Roadrunners finished the season 11–22, 6–14 in Big West play, to finish in eight place. In the Big West tournament, the team won their first-round game against Cal State Northridge before losing in the quarterfinals to UC Irvine to end their season.

== Previous season ==
The Roadrunners finished the 2021–22 season 8–19, 2–12 in Big West play, to finish tied for ninth place. As the No. 9 seed, they defeated No. 8 seed Cal State Northridge in the first round of the Big West tournament before falling to top-seeded Long Beach State in the quarterfinals.

== Roster ==
2022–23 Cal State Bakersfield Roadrunners men's basketball team
Players
Coaches

Pos.	#	Name	Height	Weight	Year	Previous school	Hometown
G	0	Cedquavious Hunter	6 ft 0 in (1.83 m)	—	Fr	North Panola HS	Como, MS
G	1	Kaleb Higgins	5 ft 10 in (1.78 m)	155 lb (70 kg)	Jr	Holmes CC	Pine Bluff, AR
F	2	Travis Henson	6 ft 6 in (1.98 m)	195 lb (88 kg)	Sr	Angelina College	Oxon Hill, MD
G	3	Dalph Panopio	6 ft 1 in (1.85 m)	180 lb (82 kg)	So	South Plains College	Rome, Italy
G/F	4	Antavion Collum	6 ft 8 in (2.03 m)	240 lb (109 kg)	Jr	Ole Miss	Memphis, TN
G	5	Naseem Gaskin	6 ft 4 in (1.93 m)	185 lb (84 kg)	RS So	CCSF	Oakland, CA
G	10	Marvin III McGhee	6 ft 4 in (1.93 m)	180 lb (82 kg)	So	South Georgia Tech	Atlanta, GA
G	11	Kaseem Watson	6 ft 7 in (2.01 m)	180 lb (82 kg)	Fr	West Catholic HS	Philadelphia, PA
G	13	Kareem Watson	6 ft 7 in (2.01 m)	180 lb (82 kg)	Fr	West Catholic HS	Philadelphia, PA
F	21	Ugnius Jarusevicius	6 ft 10 in (2.08 m)	220 lb (100 kg)	Fr	Kaunas Varpas Gimnazija	Alytus, Lithuania
F	22	Cameron Smith	6 ft 7 in (2.01 m)	205 lb (93 kg)	Sr	Pearl River CC	Okolona, MS
G	23	Ivan Reynolds	6 ft 4 in (1.93 m)	200 lb (91 kg)	So	Dillard HS	Pompano Beach, FL
F	55	Modestas Kancleris	6 ft 9 in (2.06 m)	210 lb (95 kg)	RS So	Creighton	Kaunas, Lithuania

Head coach

- Rod Barnes (Mississippi)

Assistant coach(es)

- Mike Scott (Fairleigh Dickinson)
- Brandon Barnes (Cal State Bakersfield)
- Chris Crevelone (Adams State)

Legend

- (C) Team captain
- (S) Suspended
- (I) Ineligible
- (W) Walk-on
- Injured
- Current redshirt

Roster
Last update: November 7, 2022

== Schedule and results ==
Date time, TV	Rank^{#}	Opponent^{#}	Result	Record	Site (attendance) city, state
Exhibition
November 3, 2022*; 11:00 a.m., ESPN+		Antelope Valley	W 80–62	–	Icardo Center (2,967); Bakersfield, CA
Non-conference regular season
November 7, 2022*; 7:00 p.m., ESPN+		San Diego Christian	W 68–35	1–0	Icardo Center (1,158); Bakersfield, CA
November 11, 2022*; 4:00 p.m., P12N		at Utah	L 44–72	1–1	Jon M. Huntsman Center (6,283); Salt Lake City, UT
November 16, 2022*; 6:00 p.m., ESPN+		at Idaho	W 52–43	2–1	ICCU Arena (2,042); Moscow, ID
November 22, 2022*; 3:00 p.m.		vs. Texas A&M–Corpus Christi; Jim Forbes Classic	W 73–63	3–1	Don Haskins Center; El Paso, TX
November 23, 2022*; 6:00 p.m.		at UTEP; Jim Forbes Classic	L 67–68	3–2	Don Haskins Center; El Paso, TX
November 25, 2022*; 10:00 a.m.		vs. Alcorn State; Jim Forbes Classic	L 54–62	3–3	Don Haskins Center; El Paso, TX
November 29, 2022*; 7:00 p.m., ESPN+		La Sierra	W 90–49	4–3	Icardo Center (1,016); Bakersfield, CA
December 3, 2022*; 11:00 a.m., ESPN+		at Dartmouth	L 54–79	4–4	Leede Arena (558); Hanover, NH
December 6, 2022*; 7:00 p.m.		at San Jose State	L 48–58	4–5	Provident Credit Union Event Center (1,546); San Jose, CA
December 17, 2022*; 7:00 p.m., ESPN+		Abilene Christian	L 59–65	4–6	Icardo Center (1,097); Bakersfield, CA
December 20, 2022*; 7:00 p.m., ESPN+		Fresno State	L 48–56	4–7	Icardo Center (2,531); Bakersfield, CA
Big West regular season
December 29, 2022; 5:00 p.m.		at UC Riverside	L 59–71	4–8 (0–1)	SRC Arena (263); Riverside, CA
December 31, 2022; 6:00 p.m., ESPN+		UC Irvine	L 75–79	4–9 (0–2)	Icardo Center (1,183); Bakersfield, CA
January 5, 2023; 7:00 p.m., ESPN+		Cal Poly	W 61–51	5–9 (1–2)	Icardo Center (1,326); Bakersfield, CA
January 7, 2023; 5:00 p.m.		at UC Davis	L 48–67	5–10 (1–3)	University Credit Union Center; Davis, CA
January 11, 2023; 7:00 p.m., ESPN+		UC Santa Barbara	L 48–60	5–11 (1–4)	Icardo Center (1,008); Bakersfield, CA
January 14, 2023; 8:00 p.m., ESPN+		UC San Diego	W 56–52	6–11 (2–4)	Icardo Center (932); Bakersfield, CA
January 16, 2023; 7:00 p.m., ESPN+		at Cal State Fullerton	L 46–76	6–12 (2–5)	Titan Gym (501); Fullerton, CA
January 21, 2023; 7:00 p.m., ESPN+		at UC Santa Barbara	L 58–76	6–13 (2–6)	The Thunderdome (942); Santa Barbara, CA
January 26, 2023; 7:00 p.m., ESPN+		UC Davis	L 58–79	6–14 (2–7)	Icardo Center (1,593); Bakersfield, CA
January 28, 2023; 9:00 p.m., ESPN+		at Hawaii	L 69–72	6–15 (2–8)	Stan Sheriff Center (5,729); Honolulu, HI
February 2, 2023; 7:00 p.m., ESPN+		UC Riverside	W 82–76 ^{OT}	7–15 (3–8)	Icardo Center (1,052); Bakersfield, CA
February 4, 2023; 7:00 p.m., ESPN+		at UC San Diego	W 75–69 ^{OT}	8–15 (4–8)	LionTree Arena (808); La Jolla, CA
February 9, 2023; 7:00 p.m., ESPN+		Cal State Northridge	W 73–58	9–15 (5–8)	Icardo Center (1,402); Bakersfield, CA
February 11, 2023; 7:00 p.m., ESPN+		Long Beach State	L 69–79	9–16 (5–9)	Icardo Center (1,153); Bakersfield, CA
February 15, 2023; 7:00 p.m., ESPN+		at Cal Poly	W 70–62	10–16 (6–9)	Mott Athletics Center (1,322); San Luis Obispo, CA
February 20, 2023; 7:00 p.m., ESPN+		Hawaii	L 50–61	10–17 (6–10)	Icardo Center (976); Bakersfield, CA
February 23, 2023; 7:00 p.m., ESPN+		at Cal State Northridge	L 68–75	10–18 (6–11)	Premier America Credit Union Arena; Northridge, CA
February 25, 2023; 7:00 p.m., ESPN+		Cal State Fullerton	L 66–70 ^{OT}	10–19 (6–12)	Icardo Center (1,027); Bakersfield, CA
March 2, 2023; 7:00 p.m., ESPN+		at Long Beach State	L 61–77	10–20 (6–13)	Walter Pyramid (1,480); Long Beach, CA
March 4, 2023; 6:00 p.m., ESPN+		at UC Irvine	L 44–52	10–21 (6–14)	Bren Events Center (2,803); Irvine, CA
Big West tournament
March 7, 2023; 6:00 p.m., ESPN+	(8)	vs. (9) Cal State Northridge; First round	W 51–47	11–21	Dollar Loan Center; Henderson, NV
March 9, 2023; 12:00 p.m., ESPN+	(8)	vs. (1) UC Irvine; Quarterfinals	L 51–75	11–22	Dollar Loan Center; Henderson, NV
*Non-conference game. ^{#}Rankings from AP poll. (#) Tournament seedings in parentheses. All times are in Pacific.
