= 2022–23 NCAA Division I men's basketball season =

Basketball season

- Preseason AP No. 1: North Carolina Tar Heels
- Regular season: November 7, 2022 – March 12, 2023
- NCAA Tournament: 2023
- Tournament dates: March 14 – April 3, 2023
- National Championship: NRG Stadium; Houston, Texas
- NCAA Champions: UConn Huskies
- Other champions: North Texas Mean Green (NIT), Charlotte 49ers (CBI)
- Player of the Year (Naismith, Wooden): Zach Edey, Purdue Boilermakers

The 2022–23 NCAA Division I men's basketball season began on November 7, 2022. The regular season ended on March 12, 2023, with the 2023 NCAA Division I men's basketball tournament beginning with the First Four on March 14 and ending with the championship game at NRG Stadium in Houston on April 3.

== Rule changes ==
The following rule changes were recommended by the NCAA Basketball Rules Committee to the Playing Rules Oversight Panel for the 2022−23 season:

- Flopping will now result in a Class B technical foul. Previously players called for flopping received a warning before a technical foul was assessed.
- Conferences (and the NIT) will continue to allow (on an experimental basis) the use of live and prerecorded video streams at the team bench.
- Conferences (and the NIT) who choose to use five electronic-media timeouts in the second half of their games will be able to experiment with a new format for granting those timeouts. Currently, for a game using five electronic-media timeouts in the second half, the rulebook prescribes that four of those occur in the same manner as in the first half—that is, at the first dead ball at or after the 16-, 12-, 8-, and 4-minute marks, or up to 30 seconds prior to those marks in specific circumstances. The fifth electronic-media timeout occurs when the first timeout requested by either team in the second half automatically becomes an electronic-media timeout. Competitions choosing to use this experimental rule will continue to have five electronic-media timeouts in the second half, but those will occur instead at or after the 17-, 14-, 11-, 8-, and 4-minute marks (or up to 30 seconds prior to those marks in specific circumstances), while the first team-requested timeout will no longer automatically become a media timeout.

== Season headlines ==
- April 20, 2022
  - Oscar Tshiebwe, the consensus national player of the year in 2021–22, announced he would return to Kentucky for his senior season. He became the first men's national player of the year to announce a return to college since 2008 player of the year Tyler Hansbrough at North Carolina.
  - Jay Wright retired as head coach at Villanova after 21 seasons, ending a tenure that saw the Wildcats make four Final Four appearances, including national titles in 2016 and 2018, and included Wright's 2021 induction to the Basketball Hall of Fame.
- June 20 – Darius Lee, who led Houston Baptist (now Houston Christian) in scoring and rebounding last season, was killed in a mass shooting at a gathering in Harlem. Lee, a native of the New York City neighborhood, was the only fatality among the nine victims. On October 25, Lee was posthumously named Southland Conference preseason player of the year by a unanimous vote of the conference's coaches.
- June 21 – Hartford, which started a transition from Division I to Division III in the 2021–22 school year, was announced as a new member of the D-III Commonwealth Coast Conference (CCC; now known as the Conference of New England) effective in 2023–24. The CCC press release also confirmed previous reports that Hartford would leave the America East Conference after the 2021–22 season; the Hawks would play the 2022–23 season as a D-I independent.
- June 24 – Incarnate Word, which had announced a move from the Southland Conference (SLC) to the Western Athletic Conference (WAC), backed out of this move and elected to remain in the SLC.
- June 30 – The Big Ten Conference announced that UCLA and USC would join from the Pac-12 Conference in 2024, immediately after the then-current Pac-12 media contracts expired.
- July 11 – The SLC and Lamar jointly announced that Lamar, which had previously planned to leave the WAC in 2023 to return to the SLC, would expedite this move for the 2022–23 school year.
- July 15 – The WAC announced that starting with the 2023 editions, its men's and women's tournaments would be seeded via a set of advanced metrics that it calls the WAC Résumé Seeding System, developed by statistics guru Ken Pomeroy alongside WAC officials. Tournament entry continues to be based on conference record.
- August 3 – The Colonial Athletic Association announced that Campbell would join from the Big South Conference in 2023.
- August 12
  - The NCAA, which had previously announced that the NIT semifinals and final would not be held at the traditional New York City site for at least 2023 and 2024, announced the sites for those years. The 2023 final rounds would be at Orleans Arena in Las Vegas, and the 2024 final rounds at Hinkle Fieldhouse in Indianapolis. All games before the semifinals continue to use campus sites.
  - The Indiana University and Purdue University systems announced that Indiana University–Purdue University Indianapolis would be dissolved in 2024 and replaced by separate IU- and Purdue-affiliated institutions. The current athletic program, the IUPUI Jaguars, would transfer to the new IU Indianapolis.
- August 31 – The Division I Board of Directors adopted a series of changes to transfer rules.
  - Transfer windows were adopted for all Division I sports. Student-athletes who wish to be immediately eligible at their next school must enter the NCAA transfer portal within the designated period(s) for their sport. For men's basketball, the window opens on the day after Selection Sunday and runs for 60 days.
  - Student-athletes who experience head coaching changes, or those whose athletic aid is reduced, canceled, or not renewed, may transfer outside designated windows without penalty.
  - Transferring student-athletes will be guaranteed financial aid at their next school through graduation.
- September 21 – Houston Baptist University announced it had changed its name to Houston Christian University, effective immediately. The athletic nickname of the Huskies was not affected.
- October 14 – Conference USA announced that ASUN Conference member Kennesaw State would join C-USA in 2024.
- October 24 – The AP released its preseason All-America team. Reigning national player of the year Oscar Tshiebwe and Gonzaga's Drew Timme were unanimous choices, joined by Armando Bacot of North Carolina, Marcus Sasser of Houston, and Trayce Jackson-Davis of Indiana.
- November 2 – ESPN reported that Gonzaga athletic director Chris Standiford and Big 12 Conference commissioner Brett Yormark had met the previous week in the Dallas area regarding a possible Gonzaga move to that conference as a full but non-football member. The report also indicated that Gonzaga had at least some level of talks with the Big East Conference and Pac-12 Conference in the preceding months.
- November 14 – Albany head coach Dwayne Killings, athletic director Mark Benson, and the university were sued by former Great Danes walk-on Luke Fizulich, who claimed that Killings had physically assaulted him before a game in the 2021–22 season, and had also interfered with his continued enrollment at Albany and hindered his chances of transferring to another school. The suit claimed that the university had decided to fire Killings after the incident, but changed the punishment to a five-game suspension under pressure from local business and civil rights leaders, and charged the university with showing preference to the African-American Killings due to his race.
- November 17 – During a meeting in San Francisco, the Regents of the University of California, the governing board of the University of California system, set a date of December 14 for a special meeting to make a final determination on UCLA's planned move to the Big Ten.
- December 14 – The UC Regents approved UCLA's move to the Big Ten. Additionally, conditions were made to mitigate athletes such as investing $12 million in beneficial services including nutritional support and charter flights to reduce travel time. UCLA must also pay the University of California, Berkeley an additional $2 to $10 million due to the move affecting the latter's athletic program, with the precise total being made once the Pac-12 completes its upcoming media rights deal.
- January 15 – Alabama junior reserve forward Darius Miles was one of two men arrested and charged with capital murder in connection with a shooting early that morning near the Alabama campus in Tuscaloosa in which a woman was killed.
- February 9 – The Big 12 Conference announced that it had reached an agreement with Oklahoma and Texas that allowed the two schools to leave for the Southeastern Conference in 2024 instead of the originally announced 2025 schedule. Approval by the two schools' governing boards was seen as a formality.
- March 20 – St. Francis Brooklyn announced that it would terminate its athletic program after the spring 2023 semester.
- May 10 – Le Moyne announced it would reclassify to Division I from Division II and join the Northeast Conference effective July 1, 2023.
- May 12 – Western Illinois announced it would leave the Summit League for the Ohio Valley Conference effective July 1, 2023.

=== Milestones and records ===
- During the season, the following players reached the 2,000 career point milestone – Virginia forward Jayden Gardner, Marshall guard Taevion Kinsey, Liberty guard Darius McGhee, Xavier guard Souley Boum, Oral Roberts guard Max Abmas, Coppin State guard Sam Sessoms, Texas guard Marcus Carr, Arizona State guard Desmond Cambridge, Tennessee State guard Jr. Clay, San Diego State guard Matt Bradley, Gonzaga forward Drew Timme, Memphis guard Kendric Davis, LSU forward KJ Williams, Purdue Fort Wayne guard Jarred Godfrey, Indiana forward Trayce Jackson-Davis, Wyoming swingman Hunter Maldonado, Texas Tech forward Kevin Obanor, Wake Forest guard Tyree Appleby, Fordham guard Darius Quisenberry, Penn State guard Jalen Pickett, DePaul guard Umoja Gibson, Texas forward Timmy Allen, NC State guard Jarkel Joiner, Loyola Marymount guard Cameron Shelton, and Furman guard Mike Bothwell.
- November 26 – California lost 67–59 to Clemson to start the season 0–7, becoming the first major-conference team (Note: Defined here as a team that at the time was a member of a Power Five conference or the Big East Conference.) in the last 40 years to start a season with that record. The Golden Bears fell to 0–12 before defeating UT Arlington 73–51 on December 21.
- November 28 – #18 Alabama defeated #1 North Carolina in 4 overtimes, 103–101. It was the second 4-overtime game in UNC history (Tulane, 1976) and the first time Alabama beat a top-ranked opponent since 2004 (Stanford).
- November 29 – Louisville became the second major-conference team in recent history to have started a season 0–7, losing 79–54 to Maryland. The Cardinals would slump to 0–9 before defeating Western Kentucky 94–83 on December 14. The Cardinals' start was the worst for any team in ACC history.
- November 30 – Yuri Collins of Saint Louis recorded 20 assists in a win over Tennessee State, setting a school record and tying for the fourth most in a single game in Division I history.
- December 1 – Antoine Davis of Detroit Mercy became the all-time leading scorer in the Horizon League, surpassing Alfredrick Hughes' previous record in UDM's 75–66 win over Purdue Fort Wayne.
- December 10 – Antoine Davis became the 11th NCAA Division I men's player with 3,000 career points, scoring 36 in an 82–80 loss to Charlotte to bring his total to 3,001.
- December 21 – Eastern Illinois defeated Iowa 92–83 on the road as a 31.5-point underdog according to Las Vegas sports books. This was the largest point-spread upset in D-I men's basketball in at least the previous 30 years.
- January 7 – Virginia defeated Syracuse, giving head coach Tony Bennett his 327th win at the school, breaking a school record previously held by Terry Holland. In the same game, Virginia forward Jayden Gardner grabbed his 1,000th rebound, putting him on a short list of Division I players with both 2,000 points and 1,000 rebounds.
- January 14
  - Antoine Davis hit 11 three-pointers in UDM's 87–75 win over Robert Morris to give him 513 career threes, surpassing the previous D-I record of 509 by Wofford's Fletcher Magee.
  - Eleven teams ranked in the AP poll lost, tying the record for most such losses on a single day previously set on January 29, 2011.
- January 21 – Arizona head coach Tommy Lloyd became the fastest Pac-12 Conference coach to win 50 games, doing so in 57 games, with a 58–52 win over rival UCLA.
- February 2 – With a 68–59 win over San Francisco, Saint Mary's Gaels head coach Randy Bennett earned his 500th win as head coach, all of them with the Gaels. He became the 25th coach to notch 500 wins at a sole school.
- February 4 – McGhee became Liberty's career scoring leader in the Flames' 69–64 loss to Lipscomb. The previous record was held by Karl Hess, who played for the Flames from 1976 to 1980 when the school was an NAIA member.
- February 11 – Northwestern defeated Purdue 64–58, earning its first-ever victory over an AP Poll #1-ranked team.
- February 12 – Godfrey became Purdue Fort Wayne's career scoring leader in the Mastodons' 71–64 loss to Robert Morris, surpassing John Konchar, whose college career from 2015 to 2019 started at PFW's athletic predecessor of IPFW.
- February 16 – Kendric Davis became the American Athletic Conference's all-time men's scoring leader in Memphis' 64–63 win over UCF. Davis, who began his college career at Big 12 member TCU before playing three seasons at American member SMU and then moving to Memphis for his final season of eligibility, broke the record of Temple's Quinton Rose.
- February 22 – McGhee became the men's career scoring leader for the ASUN Conference in Liberty's 85–77 win over Queens, surpassing Centenary's Willie Jackson. McGhee also became the fourth Division I men's player, and fifth D-I player overall, with 500 career threes.
- February 25 – Florida State completed the largest come-from-behind win in ACC history (25 points), defeating #13 Miami 85–84 on a buzzer-beating three-pointer by FSU's Matthew Cleveland.
- March 4 – Marshall's Taevion Kinsey passed Jon Elmore (2,638 points from 2015 to 2019) as the Thundering Herd's all-time leading scorer during their 71–68 loss to Texas State in the Sun Belt Conference tournament.
- March 7 – Gonzaga's Drew Timme passed Frank Burgess (2,196 points) as Gonzaga's all-time leading scorer during the Bulldogs' 77–51 win over Saint Mary's during the West Coast Conference tournament championship. Burgess's record had stood since 1961.
- March 9 – Arizona head basketball coach Tommy Lloyd won his 59th game as coach, the most wins of any coach in Division I history in their first two seasons of coaching. Arizona defeated Arizona State 95–84.

== Conference membership changes ==
Twenty-six schools joined new conferences or became independents, including five schools from Division II which started transitions to Division I this season and one in the process of transition from Division I to Division III.

As noted previously, Incarnate Word had announced plans to move from the Southland Conference to the Western Athletic Conference, but backed out of that move and remained in the Southland. Lamar, which initially planned to make the opposite move in 2023, pushed this move forward to 2022.

School	Former conference	New conference
Austin Peay	Ohio Valley Conference	ASUN Conference
Belmont	Ohio Valley Conference	Missouri Valley Conference
Bryant	Northeast Conference	America East Conference
Chicago State	Western Athletic Conference	Independent
Hampton	Big South Conference	Colonial Athletic Association
Hartford	America East Conference	Independent
James Madison	Colonial Athletic Association	Sun Belt Conference
Lamar	Western Athletic Conference	Southland Conference
Lindenwood	Great Lakes Valley Conference (D-II)	Ohio Valley Conference
Little Rock	Sun Belt Conference	Ohio Valley Conference
Loyola Chicago	Missouri Valley Conference	Atlantic 10 Conference
Marshall	Conference USA	Sun Belt Conference
Monmouth	Metro Atlantic Athletic Conference	Colonial Athletic Association
Mount St. Mary's	Northeast Conference	Metro Atlantic Athletic Conference
Murray State	Ohio Valley Conference	Missouri Valley Conference
North Carolina A&T	Big South Conference	Colonial Athletic Association
Old Dominion	Conference USA	Sun Belt Conference
Queens	South Atlantic Conference (D-II)	ASUN Conference
Southern Indiana	Great Lakes Valley Conference (D-II)	Ohio Valley Conference
Southern Miss	Conference USA	Sun Belt Conference
Southern Utah	Big Sky Conference	Western Athletic Conference
Stonehill	Northeast-10 Conference (D-II)	Northeast Conference
Stony Brook	America East Conference	Colonial Athletic Association
Texas A&M–Commerce	Lone Star Conference (D-II)	Southland Conference
UIC	Horizon League	Missouri Valley Conference
UT Arlington	Sun Belt Conference	Western Athletic Conference

The 2022−23 season was the last for at least 16 Division I schools in their current conferences, and the final season for a single Division II school before reclassifying to Division I. It was also Hartford's only season as a D-I independent, and the last season of athletics for St. Francis Brooklyn.

School	2022−23 conference	Future conference
BYU	WCC	Big 12
Campbell	Big South	CAA
Charlotte	C-USA	American
Cincinnati	American	Big 12
Florida Atlantic	C-USA	American
Hartford	Independent	CCC (D-III)
Houston	American	Big 12
Jacksonville State	ASUN	C-USA
Le Moyne	NE-10 (D-II)	NEC
Liberty	ASUN	C-USA
New Mexico State	WAC	C-USA
North Texas	C-USA	American
Rice	C-USA	American
St. Francis Brooklyn	NEC	None (dropped athletics)
Sam Houston	WAC	C-USA
UAB	C-USA	American
UCF	American	Big 12
UTSA	C-USA	American
Western Illinois	Summit	OVC

== Arenas ==
=== New arenas ===
- Alabama A&M opened the new Alabama A&M Events Center on November 18, losing its first game in the new facility 80–76 to Louisiana Tech on November 23.
- Fairfield's former home of Alumni Hall was replaced on-site by the new Leo D. Mahoney Arena. The Stags' first game in the new facility was a 67–55 win over Saint Peter's on December 3.
- Georgia State left GSU Sports Arena for the new Georgia State Convocation Center. The opening ceremony for the new arena was on September 15, with the first event taking place the following day. The Panthers' first official game was a 76–59 win over NAIA member Coastal Georgia on November 7.
- Texas moved from the Frank Erwin Center to the Moody Center. The Longhorns' first official game was a 72–57 win over UTEP on November 7.

=== Arenas of new D-I teams ===
All five new D-I members in 2022–23 play on their respective campuses.

- Lindenwood plays at Robert F. Hyland Performance Arena.
- Queens plays at Curry Arena.
- Southern Indiana plays at Screaming Eagles Arena.
- Stonehill plays at Merkert Gymnasium.
- Texas A&M–Commerce plays at the Texas A&M–Commerce Field House.

=== Arenas closing ===
The following D-I programs plan to open new arenas for the 2023−24 season. or will move to a different pre-existing venue. All will move within their current campuses otherwise indicated.

- Austin Peay will leave the on-campus Winfield Dunn Center for the new F&M Bank Arena in downtown Clarksville, Tennessee, after 49 seasons. The new arena was originally planned to open for the 2022–23 season, but was delayed to 2023–24.
- Baylor will leave the Ferrell Center for the new Foster Pavilion; the venue is scheduled to open in the fall of 2023 or early 2024.
- Georgia Southern will leave the Hanner Fieldhouse for the new Jack and Ruth Ann Hill Convocation Center. The venue was scheduled to open in the early fall of 2023, but was delayed until 2024–25 season.
- Longwood will leave Willett Hall for the new Joan Perry Brock Center; the venue is scheduled to open in Summer 2023.
- St. Francis Brooklyn in 2022, began closing its Remsen Street campus, including Generoso Pope Athletic Complex, as part of the college's move to a new campus on Livingston Street. After the closure, home games were played about 2 miles (3 km) away at Pratt Institute, as the Livingston Street campus has no basketball venue. The final men's basketball game played at Pope Athletic Complex was a 61–58 win over Saint Peter's on November 19.
- Vermont was originally slated to open the new Tarrant Event Center, the replacement for Patrick Gym, in 2021. However, the new arena has since been placed on indefinite hold. Construction was initially halted by COVID-19. With the Tarrant Center being part of a much larger upgrade of UVM's athletic and recreation facilities, UVM chose to prioritize a new student recreation center. Construction of the Tarrant Center is now being hampered by increased borrowing costs.

== Season outlook ==
The Top 25 from the AP and USA Today Coaching Polls

=== Pre-season polls ===
AP
Ranking	Team
1	North Carolina (47)
2	Gonzaga (12)
3	Houston (1)
4	Kentucky (2)
5	Kansas т Baylor т
7	Duke
8	UCLA
9	Creighton
10	Arkansas
11	Tennessee
12	Texas
13	Indiana
14	TCU
15	Auburn
16	Villanova
17	Arizona
18	Virginia
19	San Diego State
20	Alabama
21	Oregon
22	Michigan
23	Illinois
24	Dayton
25	Texas Tech

USA Today Coaches
Ranking	Team
1	North Carolina (23)
2	Gonzaga (5)
3	Houston (1)
4	Kentucky (3)
5	Kansas
6	Baylor
7	UCLA
8	Duke
9	Creighton
10	Arkansas
11	Tennessee
12	Texas
13	Arizona
14	Indiana
15	Auburn
16	TCU
17	Villanova
18	Virginia
19	Alabama
20	San Diego State
21	Oregon
22	Michigan
23	Illinois
24	Texas Tech
25	Dayton

=== Final polls ===
AP
Ranking	Team
1	Alabama (48)
2	Houston (9)
3	Purdue (3)
4	Kansas
5	Texas
6	Marquette
7	UCLA
8	Arizona
9	Gonzaga
10	UConn
11	Baylor
12	Duke
13	Xavier
14	Virginia
15	Kansas State
16	Miami (FL)
17	Texas A&M
18	San Diego State
19	Saint Mary's
20	Tennessee
21	Indiana
22	TCU
23	Missouri
24	Memphis
25	Florida Atlantic

USA Today Coaches
Ranking	Team
1	UConn (32)
2	San Diego State
3	Miami (FL)
4	Alabama
5	Florida Atlantic
6	Houston
7	Texas
8	UCLA
9	Kansas State
10	Gonzaga
11	Kansas
12	Creighton
13	Purdue
14	Marquette
15	Xavier
16	Tennessee
17	Arizona
18	Duke
19	Baylor
20	Michigan State
21	Arkansas
22	Saint Mary's
23	Virginia
24	Indiana
25	Texas A&M

== Top 10 matchups ==
Rankings reflect the AP poll Top 25.

=== Regular season ===
- Nov. 15
  - No. 6 Kansas defeated No. 7 Duke, 69–64 (Champions Classic – Gainbridge Fieldhouse, Indianapolis, IN)
- Nov. 20
  - No. 2 Gonzaga defeated No. 4 Kentucky, 88–72 (Spokane Arena, Spokane, WA)
  - No. 5 Baylor defeated No. 8 UCLA, 80–75 (Continental Tire Main Event – T-Mobile Arena, Paradise, NV)
- Nov. 22
  - No. 10 Creighton defeated No. 9 Arkansas, 90–87 (Maui Invitational – Lahaina Civic Center, Lahaina, HI)
- Dec. 1
  - No. 2 Texas defeated No. 7 Creighton, 72–67 (Big East–Big 12 Battle – Moody Center, Austin, TX)
- Dec. 10
  - No. 8 Alabama defeated No. 1 Houston, 71–65 (Fertitta Center, Houston, TX)
- Dec. 17
  - No. 5 Houston defeated No. 2 Virginia, 69–61 (John Paul Jones Arena, Charlottesville, VA)
  - No. 9 Arizona defeated No. 6 Tennessee, 75–70 (McKale Center, Tucson, AZ)
- Jan. 28
  - No. 4 Tennessee defeated No. 10 Texas, 82–71 (Big 12/SEC Challenge – Thompson–Boling Arena, Knoxville, TN)
- Jan. 31
  - No. 8 Kansas defeated No. 7 Kansas State, 90–78 (Allen Fieldhouse, Lawrence, KS)
- Feb. 4
  - No. 10 Texas defeated No. 7 Kansas State, 69–66 (Bramlage Coliseum, Manhattan, KS)
- Feb. 6
  - No. 9 Kansas defeated No. 5 Texas, 88–80 (Allen Fieldhouse, Lawrence, KS)
- Feb. 15
  - No. 10 Tennessee defeated No. 1 Alabama, 68–59 (Thompson-Boling Arena, Knoxville, TN)
- Feb. 18
  - No. 5 Kansas defeated No. 9 Baylor, 87–71 (Allen Fieldhouse, Lawrence, KS)
- Feb. 25
  - No. 9 Baylor defeated No. 8 Texas, 81–72 (Ferrell Center, Waco, TX)
- Mar. 4
  - No. 9 Texas defeated No. 3 Kansas, 75–59 (Moody Center, Austin, TX)
  - No. 4 UCLA defeated No. 8 Arizona, 82–73 (Pauley Pavilion, Los Angeles, CA)
- Mar. 11
  - No. 7 Texas defeated No. 3 Kansas, 76–56 (2023 Big 12 men's basketball tournament – T-Mobile Center, Kansas City, MO)
  - No. 8 Arizona defeated No. 2 UCLA, 61–59 (2023 Pac-12 Conference men's basketball tournament – T-Mobile Center, Paradise, NV)

== Regular season ==
=== Early season tournaments ===
Names	Dates	Location	Teams	Champion	Runner-up	3rd-place winner
Asheville Championship	November 11–13	Harrah's Cherokee Center (Asheville, NC)	4	Louisiana	East Tennessee State	Harvard
Legends Classic	November 16–17	Barclays Center (Brooklyn, NY)	4	Arizona State	Michigan	VCU
Charleston Classic	November 17−20	TD Arena (Charleston, SC)	8	College of Charleston	Virginia Tech	Penn State
Myrtle Beach Invitational	November 17−20	HTC Center (Conway, SC)	8	UMass	Charlotte	Murray State
Continental Tire Main Event	November 18−20	T-Mobile Arena (Las Vegas, NV)	4	Virginia	Illinois	Baylor
Jamaica Classic	November 18–20	Montego Bay Convention Centre (Montego Bay, JA)	8	Loyola Marymount (Montego Bay); Queens (Rose Hall)	Wake Forest (Montego Bay); Morgan State (Rose Hall)	Georgetown (Montego Bay); Utah Valley (Rose Hall)
Paradise Jam Tournament	November 18−21	Sports and Fitness Center (Saint Thomas, VI)	8	Drake	Tarleton	Boston College
Hall of Fame Tip Off	November 19−20	Mohegan Sun Arena (Uncasville, CT)	4	Maryland	Miami (FL)	Saint Louis
Sunshine Slam	November 19−20	Ocean Center (Daytona Beach, FL)	8	UAB (A Bracket); Bucknell (B Bracket)	Georgia (A Bracket); Austin Peay (B Bracket)	South Florida (A Bracket); Albany (B Bracket)
Empire Classic	November 21–22	Barclays Center (Brooklyn, NY)	4	St. John's	Syracuse	Richmond
Hall of Fame Classic	November 21−22	T-Mobile Center (Kansas City, MO)	4	San Francisco	Wichita State	Grand Canyon
Gulf Coast Showcase	November 21−23	Hertz Arena (Estero, FL)	8	Florida Gulf Coast	Kansas City	Indiana State
Maui Invitational	November 21−23	Lahaina Civic Center (Maui, HI)	8	Arizona	Creighton	Arkansas
Fort Myers Tip-Off	November 21−23	Suncoast Credit Union Arena (Fort Myers, FL)	8	Mississippi State	Utah	Marquette
Cayman Islands Classic	November 21–23	John Gray Gymnasium (George Town, Grand Cayman, CYM)	8	Kansas State	LSU	Nevada
SoCal Challenge	November 21−23	The Pavilion at JSerra (San Juan, CA)	8	High Point (Sand); UNLV (Surf)	Tennessee State (Sand); Minnesota (Surf)	Central Michigan (Sand); Southern Illinois (Surf)
Cancún Challenge	November 22−23	Moon Palace Golf & Spa Resort (Cancún, MX)	8	Auburn (Riviera); Southern Miss (Mayan)	Northwestern (Riviera); Purdue Fort Wayne (Mayan)	Liberty (Riviera); Winthrop (Mayan)
Battle 4 Atlantis	November 23−25	Imperial Arena (Paradise Island, Nassau, Bahamas)	8	Tennessee	Kansas	Wisconsin
Wooden Legacy	November 24−25	Anaheim Convention Center (Anaheim, CA)	4	Washington	St. Mary's	Vanderbilt
Bahamas Championship	November 24−26	Baha Mar Convention Center (Nassau, Bahamas)	4	UCF	Santa Clara	Oklahoma State
ESPN Events Invitational	November 24−27	HP Field House (Lake Buena Vista, FL)	8	Oklahoma	Ole Miss	Siena
Phil Knight Invitational	November 24−27	Chiles Center, Moda Center, and Veterans Memorial Coliseum (Portland, OR)	8	UConn	Iowa State	Alabama
Phil Knight Legacy	November 24−27	Chiles Center, Moda Center, and Veterans Memorial Coliseum (Portland, OR)	8	Purdue	Duke	Gonzaga
Emerald Coast Classic	November 25−26	The Arena at NFSC (Niceville, FL)	4	TCU; Omaha	Iowa; Southern	Clemson; Loyola (MD)
Las Vegas Invitational	November 25−26	Orleans Arena (Las Vegas Valley, NV)	4	UC Irvine	New Mexico State	Nicholls
Nassau Championship	November 25−27	Baha Mar Convention Center (Nassau, Bahamas)	8	UNC Wilmington	North Texas	Long Beach State
Sun Bowl Invitational	December 21–22	Don Haskins Center (El Paso, TX)	4	Kent State	UTEP	New Mexico State
Diamond Head Classic	December 22–25	Stan Sheriff Center (Honolulu, HI)	8	Hawai'i	SMU	Utah State

=== Upsets ===
An upset is a victory by an underdog team. In the context of NCAA Division I men's basketball, this generally constitutes an unranked team defeating a team currently ranked in the top 25. This list will highlight those upsets of ranked teams by unranked teams as well as upsets of No. 1 teams. Rankings are from the AP poll. Bold type indicates winning teams in "true road games"—i.e., those played on an opponent's home court (including secondary homes). Italics type indicates winning teams in an early season tournament (or event). Early season tournaments are tournaments played in the early season. Events are the tournaments with the same teams in it every year (even rivalry games).

Winner	Score	Loser	Date	Tournament/event	Notes
Temple	68–64	No. 16 Villanova	November 11, 2022	Philadelphia Big 5	
**UC Irvine**	69–56	No. 21 Oregon	November 11, 2022		
**Colorado**	78–66	No. 11 Tennessee	November 13, 2022		Game played in Nashville, TN
**Northwestern State**	64–63	No. 15 TCU	November 14, 2022		
Michigan State	86–77 ^{2OT}	No. 4 Kentucky	November 15, 2022	Champions Classic	Game played in Indianapolis, IN
UNLV	60–52	No. 21 Dayton	November 15, 2022		
Murray State	88–79	No. 24 Texas A&M	November 17, 2022	Myrtle Beach Invitational	
Arizona State	87–62	No. 20 Michigan	November 17, 2022	Legends Classic	
Colorado	103–75	No. 24 Texas A&M	November 18, 2022	Myrtle Beach Invitational	
Ohio State	80–73	No. 21 Texas Tech	November 23, 2022	Maui Invitational	
Iowa State	70–65	No. 1 North Carolina	November 25, 2022	Phil Knight Invitational	
TCU	79–66	No. 25 Iowa	November 26, 2022	Emerald Coast Classic	
No. 18 Alabama	103–101^{4OT}	No. 1 North Carolina	November 27, 2022	Phil Knight Invitational	Alabama's first victory over #1 opponent since 3/20/04 over Stanford 70–67. First #1 victory with Nate Oats.
Marquette	96–70	No. 6 Baylor	November 29, 2022	Big East–Big 12 Battle	
Notre Dame	70–52	No. 20 Michigan State	November 30, 2022	ACC–Big Ten Challenge	
Utah	81–66	No. 4 Arizona	December 1, 2022		
Rutgers	63–48	No. 10 Indiana	December 3, 2022		
Virginia Tech	80–72	No. 18 North Carolina	December 4, 2022		
**Nebraska**	63–53	No. 7 Creighton	December 4, 2022	Rivalry	
**Northwestern**	70–63	No. 20 Michigan State	December 4, 2022		
Wisconsin	64–59	No. 13 Maryland	December 6, 2022		
Iowa	75–56	No. 20 Iowa State	December 8, 2022	Iowa Corn Cy-Hawk Series/Rivalry	Fran McCaffery's 500th career victory as coach
**Penn State**	74–59	No. 17 Illinois	December 10, 2022		
Saint Mary's	68–61	No. 22 San Diego State	December 10, 2022	Jerry Colangelo Classic	Game played in Phoenix, AZ
**No. 8 Alabama**	71–65	No. 1 Houston	December 10, 2022		
Memphis	82–73	No. 11 Auburn	December 10, 2022	Holiday Hoopsgiving	Game played in Atlanta, GA
BYU	83–80	No. 21 Creighton	December 10, 2022	Jack Jones Hoopfest	Game played in Las Vegas, NV
North Carolina	89–84^{OT}	No. 23 Ohio State	December 17, 2022	CBS Sports Classic	Game played in New York City
USC	74–71	No. 19 Auburn	December 18, 2022		
Drake	58–52	No. 15 Mississippi State	December 20, 2022	Battle in the Vault	Game played in Lincoln, NE
Wake Forest	81–70	No. 14 Duke	December 20, 2022		
Providence	103–98^{2OT}	No. 24 Marquette	December 20, 2022		
Boston College	70–65^{OT}	No. 21 Virginia Tech	December 21, 2022		
San Francisco	97–60	No. 25 Arizona State	December 21, 2022		
Missouri	93–71	No. 16 Illinois	December 22, 2022	Braggin' Rights	Game played in St. Louis
Missouri	89–75	No. 19 Kentucky	December 28, 2022		
LSU	60–57	No. 9 Arkansas	December 28, 2022		
Pittsburgh	76–74	No. 25 North Carolina	December 30, 2022		
Iowa State	77–62	No. 12 Baylor	December 31, 2022		
Kansas State	82–76^{OT}	No. 24 West Virginia	December 31, 2022		
**Rutgers**	65–64	No. 1 Purdue	January 2, 2023		
Pittsburgh	68–65	No. 11 Virginia	January 3, 2023		
**Kansas State**	116–103	No. 6 Texas	January 3, 2023		
Fresno State	71–67	No. 21 New Mexico	January 3, 2023		
Georgia	76–64	No. 22 Auburn	January 4, 2023		
Georgia Tech	76–70	No. 12 Miami (FL)	January 4, 2023		
NC State	84–60	No. 16 Duke	January 4, 2023	Tobacco Road	
Providence	73–61	No. 4 UConn	January 4, 2023		
Iowa	91–89	No. 15 Indiana	January 5, 2023		
Illinois	79–69	No. 14 Wisconsin	January 7, 2023		
**Washington State**	74–61	No. 5 Arizona	January 7, 2023		
**Kansas State**	97–95^{OT}	No. 19 Baylor	January 7, 2023		
**UNLV**	84–77	No. 21 New Mexico	January 7, 2023		
**Northwestern**	84–83	No. 15 Indiana	January 8, 2023		
Maryland	80–73	No. 24 Ohio State	January 8, 2023		
**Michigan State**	69–65	No. 18 Wisconsin	January 10, 2023		
Texas A&M	82–64	No. 20 Missouri	January 11, 2023		
NC State	83–81^{OT}	No. 16 Miami (FL)	January 14, 2023		
**Kentucky**	63–56	No. 5 Tennessee	January 14, 2023		
Indiana	63–45	No. 18 Wisconsin	January 14, 2023		
Creighton	73–67	No. 19 Providence	January 14, 2023		
Vanderbilt	97–84	No. 15 Arkansas	January 14, 2023		
Florida	73–64	No. 20 Missouri	January 14, 2023		
Clemson	72–64	No. 24 Duke	January 14, 2023		
Oregon	87–68	No. 9 Arizona	January 14, 2023		
**New Mexico**	76–67	No. 23 San Diego State	January 14, 2023		
**St. John's**	85–74	No. 6 UConn	January 15, 2023		
Wake Forest	87–77	No. 19 Clemson	January 17, 2023		
Seton Hall	67–66	No. 15 UConn	January 18, 2023		
West Virginia	74–65	No. 14 TCU	January 18, 2023		
DePaul	73–72	No. 8 Xavier	January 18, 2023		
Missouri	79–76	No. 25 Arkansas	January 18, 2023		
Michigan State	70–57	No. 23 Rutgers	January 19, 2023		
**Loyola Marymount**	68–67	No. 6 Gonzaga	January 19, 2023		LMU's win over Gonzaga snapped the Zags' 76-game home winning streak, which was the longest in the nation at the time.
Duke	68–66	No. 17 Miami (FL)	January 21, 2023		
Oklahoma State	61–59	No. 12 Iowa State	January 21, 2023		
**Temple**	56–55	No. 1 Houston	January 22, 2023		
Nevada	97–94^{2OT}	No. 25 New Mexico	January 23, 2023		
**Texas A&M**	79–63	No. 15 Auburn	January 25, 2023		
USC	77–64	No. 8 UCLA	January 26, 2023	Rivalry	
Creighton	84–67	No. 13 Xavier	January 28, 2023		
West Virginia	80–77	No. 15 Auburn	January 28, 2023	Big 12/SEC Challenge	
Oklahoma	93–69	No. 2 Alabama	January 28, 2023	Big 12/SEC Challenge	
Missouri	78–61	No. 12 Iowa State	January 28, 2023	Big 12/SEC Challenge	
Pittsburgh	71–68	No. 20 Miami (FL)	January 28, 2023		
**Hofstra**	85–81	No. 18 Charleston	January 28, 2023		
Mississippi State	81–74^{OT}	No. 11 TCU	January 28, 2023	Big 12/SEC Challenge	
Texas Tech	80–77^{OT}	No. 13 Iowa State	January 30, 2023		Largest comeback in team history
Boston College	62–54	No. 20 Clemson	January 31, 2023		
Maryland	66–55	No. 21 Indiana	January 31, 2023		
Nevada	75–66	No. 22 San Diego State	January 31, 2023		
Florida	67–54	No. 2 Tennessee	February 1, 2023		
UAB	86–77	No. 19 Florida Atlantic	February 2, 2023		
Virginia Tech	74–68	No. 6 Virginia	February 4, 2023	Rivalry	
Oklahoma State	79–73	No. 15 TCU	February 4, 2023		
No. 21 Indiana	79–74	No. 1 Purdue	February 4, 2023	Indiana National Guard Governor's Cup/Rivalry	
Vanderbilt	66–65	No. 6 Tennessee	February 8, 2023		
West Virginia	76–71	No. 11 Iowa State	February 8, 2023		
Loyola Marymount	78–74^{OT}	No. 15 Saint Mary's	February 9, 2023		
Butler	69–67	No. 13 Xavier	February 10, 2023		
St. John's	73–68	No. 20 Providence	February 11, 2023		
Illinois	69–60	No. 24 Rutgers	February 11, 2023		
**Oklahoma State**	64–56	No. 11 Iowa State	February 11, 2023		
**Missouri**	86–85	No. 6 Tennessee	February 11, 2023		
Texas Tech	71–63	No. 12 Kansas State	February 11, 2023		
Stanford	88–79	No. 4 Arizona	February 11, 2023		
Northwestern	64–58	No. 1 Purdue	February 12, 2023		First win over a No. 1 AP-ranked team in program history
Texas Tech	74–67	No. 6 Texas	February 13, 2023		
Syracuse	75–72	No. 23 NC State	February 14, 2023		
Oklahoma	79–65	No. 12 Kansas State	February 14, 2023		
No. 10 Tennessee	68–59	No. 1 Alabama	February 15, 2023		
Northwestern	64–62	No. 14 Indiana	February 15, 2023		
Maryland	68–54	No. 3 Purdue	February 16, 2023		
Middle Tennessee	74–70	No. 25 Florida Atlantic	February 16, 2023		
Kentucky	66–54	No. 10 Tennessee	February 18, 2023	Rivalry	
**Villanova**	64–63	No. 16 Xavier	February 21, 2023		
Michigan State	80–65	No. 17 Indiana	February 21, 2023		
Boston College	63–48	No. 6 Virginia	February 22, 2023		
Illinois	66–62	No. 21 Northwestern	February 23, 2023	Rivalry	
Villanova	79–67	No. 19 Creighton	February 25, 2023		
**Oklahoma**	61–50	No. 23 Iowa State	February 25, 2023		
**Arizona State**	89–88	No. 7 Arizona	February 25, 2023	Rivalry	
Mississippi State	69–62	No. 25 Texas A&M	February 25, 2023		
**Florida State**	85–84	No. 13 Miami (FL)	February 25, 2023		
North Carolina	71–63	No. 6 Virginia	February 25, 2023		
Maryland	75–59	No. 21 Northwestern	February 26, 2023		
Iowa	90–68	No. 15 Indiana	February 28, 2023		
Boise State	66–60	No. 18 San Diego State	February 28, 2023		
**Vanderbilt**	68–66	No. 23 Kentucky	March 1, 2023		
Ohio State	73–62	No. 21 Maryland	March 1, 2023		
Notre Dame	88–81	No. 25 Pittsburgh	March 1, 2023		
**Seton Hall**	82–58	No. 20 Providence	March 4, 2023		
**Iowa State**	73–58	No. 7 Baylor	March 4, 2023		
West Virginia	89–81	No. 11 Kansas State	March 4, 2023		
Auburn	79–70	No. 12 Tennessee	March 4, 2023		
Oklahoma	74–60	No. 22 TCU	March 4, 2023		
Penn State	65–64	No. 21 Maryland	March 5, 2023		
Iowa State	78–72	No. 10 Baylor	March 9, 2023	Big 12 Championship	
Vanderbilt	80–73	No. 23 Kentucky	March 10, 2023	SEC Tournament	
Penn State	77–73	No. 19 Indiana	March 11, 2023	Big Ten Tournament	
Memphis	75–65	No. 1 Houston	March 12, 2023	The American Tournament	

In addition to the above listed upsets in which an unranked team defeated a ranked team, there have been eight non-Division I teams to defeat a Division I team so far this season. Bold type indicates winning teams in "true road games"—i.e., those played on an opponent's home court (including secondary homes).

Winner	Score	Loser	Date
**Notre Dame (OH)** (Division II)	72–68	Cleveland State	November 7, 2022
**Lincoln (MO)** (Division II)	59–56	Kansas City	November 7, 2022
**Illinois–Springfield** (Division II)	83–77	Northern Illinois	November 7, 2022
**Colorado Christian** (Division II)	70–69	Northern Colorado	November 22, 2022
**Tennessee Southern** (NAIA)	84–82	Samford	November 27, 2022
**Georgian Court** (Division II)	75–69	Delaware State	December 10, 2022
**Cal State East Bay** (Division II)	79–73	Pacific	December 11, 2022
**Mary Hardin–Baylor** (Division III)	71–65	Texas State	December 13, 2022

=== Conference winners and tournaments ===
Each of the 32 Division I athletic conferences ended its regular season with a single-elimination tournament. The team with the best regular-season record in each conference received the number one seed in each tournament, with tiebreakers used as needed in the case of ties for the top seeding. Unless otherwise noted, the winners of these tournaments received automatic invitations to the 2023 NCAA Division I men's basketball tournament.

Conference	Regular season first place	Conference player of the year	Conference coach of the Year	Conference tournament	Tournament venue (city)	Tournament winner
America East Conference	Vermont	Finn Sullivan, Vermont	Pat Duquette, UMass Lowell	2023 America East men's basketball tournament	Campus sites	Vermont
American Athletic Conference	Houston	Marcus Sasser, Houston	Kelvin Sampson, Houston	2023 American Athletic Conference men's basketball tournament	Dickies Arena (Fort Worth, TX)	Memphis
ASUN Conference	Kennesaw State (Note: Top seed in conference tournament.); Liberty	Darius McGhee, Liberty	Amir Abdur-Rahim, Kennesaw State	2023 ASUN men's basketball tournament	Campus sites	Kennesaw State
Atlantic 10 Conference	VCU	Ace Baldwin Jr., VCU	Keith Urgo, Fordham	2023 Atlantic 10 men's basketball tournament	Barclays Center (Brooklyn, NY)	VCU
Atlantic Coast Conference	Miami (FL); Virginia	Isaiah Wong, Miami (FL)	Jeff Capel, Pittsburgh	2023 ACC men's basketball tournament	Greensboro Coliseum (Greensboro, NC)	Duke
Big 12 Conference	Kansas	Jalen Wilson, Kansas	Jerome Tang, Kansas State	2023 Big 12 men's basketball tournament	T-Mobile Center (Kansas City, MO)	Texas
Big East Conference	Marquette	Tyler Kolek, Marquette	Shaka Smart, Marquette	2023 Big East men's basketball tournament	Madison Square Garden (New York, NY)	Marquette
Big Sky Conference	Eastern Washington	Steele Venters, Eastern Washington	David Riley, Eastern Washington	2023 Big Sky Conference men's basketball tournament	Idaho Central Arena (Boise, ID)	Montana State
Big South Conference	UNC Asheville	Drew Pember, UNC Asheville	Mike Morrell, UNC Asheville	2023 Big South Conference men's basketball tournament	Bojangles Coliseum (Charlotte, NC)	UNC Asheville
Big Ten Conference	Purdue	Zach Edey, Purdue	Chris Collins, Northwestern	2023 Big Ten men's basketball tournament	United Center (Chicago, IL)	Purdue
Big West Conference	UC Irvine; UC Santa Barbara	Ajay Mitchell, UC Santa Barbara	Mike Magpayo, UC Riverside	2023 Big West Conference men's basketball tournament	Dollar Loan Center (Henderson, NV)	UC Santa Barbara
Colonial Athletic Association	Charleston; Hofstra	Aaron Estrada, Hofstra	Speedy Claxton, Hofstra	2023 CAA men's basketball tournament	Entertainment and Sports Arena (Washington, D.C.)	Charleston
Conference USA	Florida Atlantic	Tylor Perry, North Texas	Dusty May, Florida Atlantic	2023 Conference USA men's basketball tournament	Ford Center at The Star (Frisco, TX)	Florida Atlantic
Horizon League	Youngstown State	Antoine Davis, Detroit Mercy	Jerrod Calhoun, Youngstown State	2023 Horizon League men's basketball tournament	Quarterfinals: Campus sites Semifinals and final: Indiana Farmers Coliseum (Indianapolis, IN)	Northern Kentucky
Ivy League	Princeton; Yale	Jordan Dingle, Penn	James Jones, Yale	2023 Ivy League men's basketball tournament	Jadwin Gymnasium (Princeton, NJ)	Princeton
Metro Atlantic Athletic Conference	Iona	Walter Clayton Jr., Iona	Rick Pitino, Iona	2023 MAAC men's basketball tournament	Boardwalk Hall (Atlantic City, NJ)	Iona
Mid-American Conference	Toledo	RayJ Dennis, Toledo	Tod Kowalczyk, Toledo	2023 Mid-American Conference men's basketball tournament	Rocket Mortgage FieldHouse (Cleveland, OH)	Kent State
Mid-Eastern Athletic Conference	Howard	Joe Bryant Jr., Norfolk State	Kenny Blakeney, Howard	2023 MEAC men's basketball tournament	Norfolk Scope (Norfolk, VA)	Howard
Missouri Valley Conference	Bradley	Tucker DeVries, Drake	Brian Wardle, Bradley	2023 Missouri Valley Conference men's basketball tournament	Enterprise Center (St. Louis, MO)	Drake
Mountain West Conference	San Diego State	Omari Moore, San Jose State	Tim Miles, San Jose State	2023 Mountain West Conference men's basketball tournament	Thomas and Mack Center (Paradise, NV)	San Diego State
Northeast Conference	Merrimack	Josh Cohen, Saint Francis (PA) & Jordan Minor, Merrimack	Chris Kraus, Stonehill	2023 Northeast Conference men's basketball tournament	Campus sites	Merrimack (Note: Fairleigh Dickinson, which lost to Merrimack in the tournament final, received the NEC automatic bid because Merrimack is ineligible for NCAA-sponsored postseason play during its transition from Division II.)
Ohio Valley Conference	Morehead State	Mark Freeman, Morehead State	Preston Spradlin, Morehead State	2023 Ohio Valley Conference men's basketball tournament	Ford Center (Evansville, IN)	Southeast Missouri State
Pac-12 Conference	UCLA	Jaime Jaquez Jr., UCLA	Mick Cronin, UCLA	2023 Pac-12 Conference men's basketball tournament	T-Mobile Arena (Paradise, NV)	Arizona
Patriot League	Colgate	Tucker Richardson, Colgate	Matt Langel, Colgate	2023 Patriot League men's basketball tournament	Campus sites	Colgate
Southeastern Conference	Alabama	Brandon Miller, Alabama	Jerry Stackhouse, Vanderbilt (Coaches) & Buzz Williams, Texas A&M (Coaches & Media)	2023 SEC men's basketball tournament	Bridgestone Arena (Nashville, TN)	Alabama
Southern Conference	Furman; Samford	Jalen Slawson, Furman	Mike Jones, UNC Greensboro (Coaches) & Bucky McMillan, Samford (Media)	2023 Southern Conference men's basketball tournament	Harrah's Cherokee Center (Asheville, NC)	Furman
Southland Conference	Texas A&M–Corpus Christi	DeMarcus Sharp, Northwestern State	Steve Lutz, Texas A&M–Corpus Christi	2023 Southland Conference men's basketball tournament	The Legacy Center (Lake Charles, LA)	Texas A&M–Corpus Christi
Southwestern Athletic Conference	Alcorn State; Grambling State	Cameron Christon, Grambling State	Landon Bussie, Alcorn State & Donte Jackson, Grambling State	2023 SWAC men's basketball tournament	Bartow Arena (Birmingham, AL)	Texas Southern
Summit League	Oral Roberts	Max Abmas, Oral Roberts	Paul Mills, Oral Roberts	2023 Summit League men's basketball tournament	Denny Sanford Premier Center (Sioux Falls, SD)	Oral Roberts
Sun Belt Conference	Southern Miss	Taevion Kinsey, Marshall	Jay Ladner, Southern Miss	2023 Sun Belt Conference men's basketball tournament	Pensacola Bay Center (Pensacola, FL)	Louisiana
West Coast Conference	Gonzaga; Saint Mary's	Brandin Podziemski, Santa Clara & Drew Timme, Gonzaga	Randy Bennett, Saint Mary's	2023 West Coast Conference men's basketball tournament	Orleans Arena (Paradise, NV) (Note: The first round of the WAC tournament was held at Michelob Ultra Arena, also in the community of Paradise.)	Gonzaga
Western Athletic Conference	Utah Valley	Qua Grant, Sam Houston	Mark Madsen, Utah Valley	2023 WAC men's basketball tournament	Orleans Arena (Paradise, NV)	Grand Canyon

=== Statistical leaders ===
Source for additional stats categories

**Points per game**			**Rebounds per game**			**Assists per game**			**Steals per game**		
Player	School	PPG	Player	School	RPG	Player	School	APG	Player	School	SPG
Antoine Davis	Detroit Mercy	28.2	Oscar Tshiebwe	Kentucky	13.7	Yuri Collins	Saint Louis	10.1	Kellen Tynes	Maine	3.27
Jordan Dingle	Penn	23.4	Zach Edey	Purdue	12.9	Markquis Nowell	Kansas State	8.2	Jaelen House	New Mexico	2.69
Darius McGhee	Liberty	22.8	Joel Soriano	St. John's	11.9	Tyler Kolek	Marquette	7.5	Malique Jacobs	Kent State	2.65
Elijah Pepper	UC Davis	22.5	Enrique Freeman	Akron	11.2	Isaiah Stevens	Colorado State	6.7	D'Moi Hodge	Missouri	2.60
Jordan Walker	UAB	22.3	Dillon Jones	Weber State	10.9	Jalen Pickett	Penn State	6.6	Jaylen Clark	UCLA	2.60

**Blocked shots per game**			**Field goal percentage**			**Three-point field goal percentage**			**Free throw percentage**		
Player	School	BPG	Player	School	FG%	Player	School	3FG%	Player	School	FT%
Jamarion Sharp	Western Kentucky	4.09	Max Fiedler	Rice	73.53	Jordan Johnson	New Orleans	48.19	Walter Clayton Jr.	Iona	95.33
Connor Vanover	Oral Roberts	3.24	Josh Roberts	Manhattan	70.24	Drew Friberg	Bemont	45.54	Jomaru Brown	Coastal Carolina	92.86
Colin Castleton	Florida	3.00	Ryan Kalkbrenner	Creighton	69.52	Tajion Jones	UNC Asheville	44.80	Mekhi Lairy	Miami (OH)	92.20
Trayce Jackson-Davis	Indiana	2.88	Kris Bankston	Norfolk State	68.85	Gabe Dorsey	William & Mary	44.44	Foster Loyer	Davidson	92.09
Aziz Bandaogo	Utah Valley	2.86	Keegan Records	Colgate	67.47	Brandin Podziemski	Santa Clara	43.78	Max Abmas	Oral Roberts	91.86

== Postseason tournaments ==
The NCAA tournament tipped off on March 14, 2023, with the First Four in Dayton, Ohio, and concluded on April 3 at NRG Stadium in Houston. A total of 68 teams entered the tournament. Thirty-two of the teams earned automatic bids by winning their conference tournaments. The remaining 36 teams were granted "at-large" bids, which are extended by the NCAA Selection Committee.

=== Final Four – NRG Stadium in Houston, TX ===
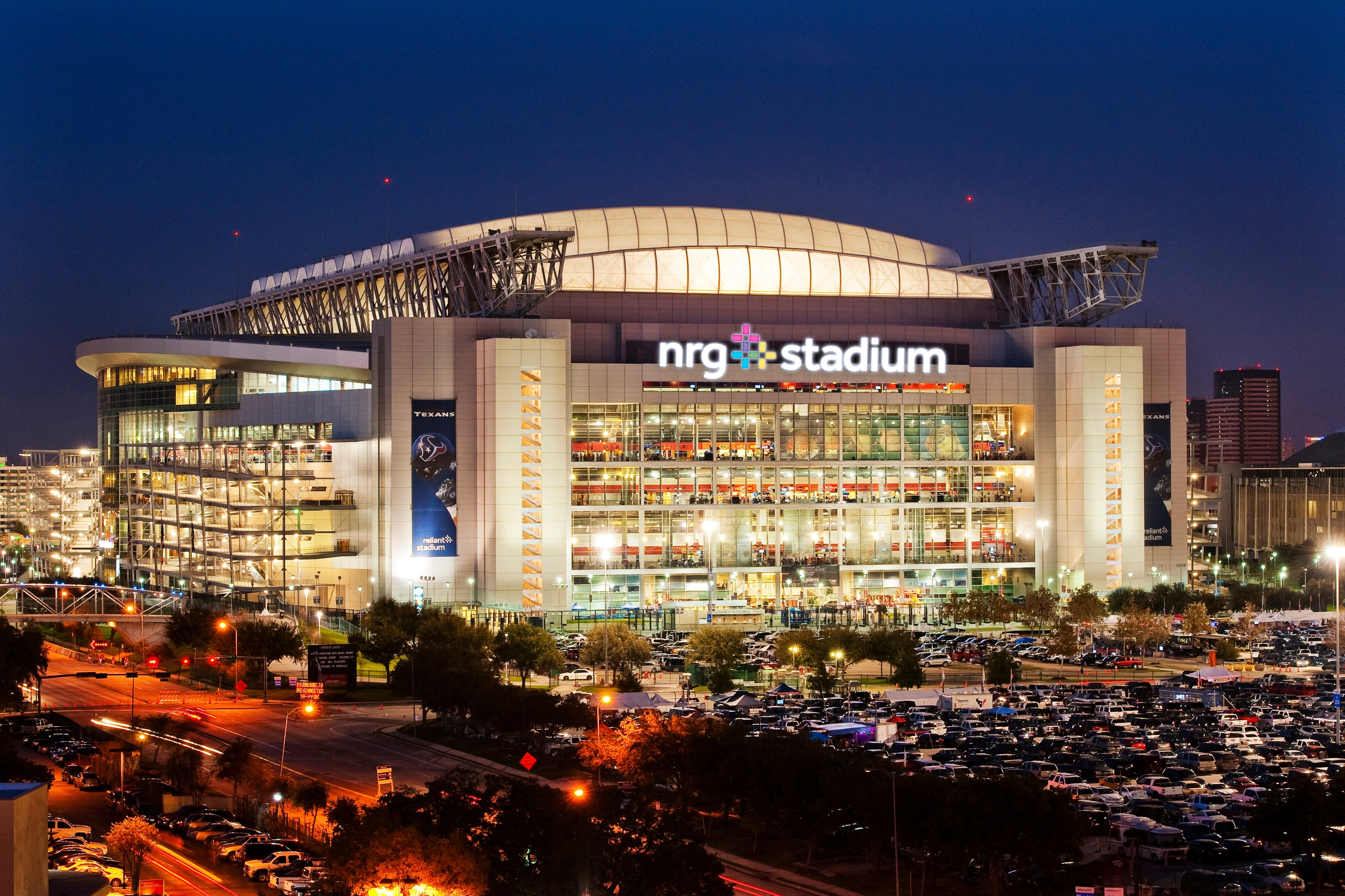
NRG Stadium in Houston, Texas, hosted the NCAA men's Final Four.

National Semifinals; April 1
S5	San Diego State	72
E9	Florida Atlantic	71
MW5	Miami	59
W4	UConn	72

National Championship; April 3
S5	San Diego State	59
W4	UConn	76

=== Tournament upsets ===
Per the NCAA, an upset occurs "when the losing team in an NCAA tournament game was seeded at least two seed lines better than the winning team." The 2023 tournament saw a total of 13 upsets, with five in the first round, four in the second round, three in the Sweet Sixteen, one in the Elite Eight, and zero in the Final Four.

Round	West	Midwest	South	East
First round	None	No. 10 Penn State defeated No. 7 Texas A&M, 76–59; No. 11 Pittsburgh defeated No. 6 Iowa State, 59–41	No. 13 Furman defeated No. 4 Virginia, 68–67; No. 15 Princeton defeated No. 2 Arizona, 59–55	No. 16 Fairleigh Dickinson defeated No. 1 Purdue, 63–58
Second round	No. 8 Arkansas defeated No. 1 Kansas, 72–71	None	No. 6 Creighton defeated No. 3 Baylor, 85–76; No. 15 Princeton defeated No. 7 Missouri, 78–63	No. 7 Michigan State defeated No. 2 Marquette, 69–60
Sweet 16	None	No. 5 Miami (FL) defeated No. 1 Houston 89–75	No. 5 San Diego State defeated No. 1 Alabama 71–64	No. 9 Florida Atlantic defeated No. 4 Tennessee 62–55
Elite 8	None		None	No. 9 Florida Atlantic defeated No. 3 Kansas State, 79–76
Final 4	None			

=== National Invitation tournament ===
After the NCAA tournament field was announced, the National Invitation Tournament invited 32 teams to participate, reducing the field's size from 40. Eight teams were given automatic bids for winning their conference regular seasons, and 24 other teams were also invited.

==== Semifinals and finals ====
Semifinals; March 28
2	North Texas	56
2	Wisconsin	54
Utah Valley	86
4	UAB	88*

Championship; March 30
2	North Texas	68
4	UAB	61

* Denotes overtime period

=== College Basketball Invitational ===
After the NCAA tournament field was announced, the College Basketball Invitational invited 16 teams to participate.

==== Semifinals and finals ====
Semifinals; March 21
8	Eastern Kentucky	108**
4	Southern Utah	106
10	Radford	56
3	Charlotte	63

Championship; March 22
8	Eastern Kentucky	68
3	Charlotte	71

* Denotes overtime period

== Conference standings ==
2022–23 America East Conference men's basketball standings
	Conf.				Overall
Team	W		L	PCT	W		L	PCT
Vermont †	14	–	2	.875	23	–	11	.676
UMass Lowell	11	–	5	.688	26	–	8	.765
New Hampshire	9	–	7	.563	15	–	15	.500
UMBC	8	–	8	.500	18	–	14	.563
Binghamton	8	–	8	.500	13	–	18	.419
Bryant	8	–	8	.500	17	–	13	.567
Maine	7	–	9	.438	13	–	17	.433
NJIT	4	–	12	.250	7	–	23	.233
Albany	3	–	13	.188	8	–	23	.258
† 2023 AmEast Tournament winner

2022–23 American Athletic Conference men's basketball standings
	Conf.				Overall
Team	W		L	PCT	W		L	PCT
No. 2 Houston	17	–	1	.944	33	–	4	.892
No. 24 Memphis †	13	–	5	.722	26	–	9	.743
Tulane	12	–	6	.667	20	–	11	.645
Cincinnati	11	–	7	.611	23	–	13	.639
Temple	10	–	8	.556	16	–	16	.500
Wichita State	9	–	9	.500	17	–	15	.531
UCF	8	–	10	.444	19	–	15	.559
South Florida	7	–	11	.389	14	–	18	.438
East Carolina	6	–	12	.333	16	–	17	.485
SMU	5	–	13	.278	10	–	22	.313
Tulsa	1	–	17	.056	5	–	25	.167
† 2023 AAC tournament winner Rankings from AP poll

2022–23 Atlantic 10 men's basketball standings
	Conf.				Overall
Team	W		L	PCT	W		L	PCT
VCU †	15	–	3	.833	27	–	8	.771
Fordham	12	–	6	.667	25	–	8	.758
Dayton	12	–	6	.667	22	–	12	.647
Saint Louis	12	–	6	.667	21	–	12	.636
George Mason	11	–	7	.611	20	–	13	.606
Duquesne	10	–	8	.556	20	–	13	.606
George Washington	10	–	8	.556	16	–	16	.500
Davidson	8	–	10	.444	16	–	16	.500
Saint Joseph's	8	–	10	.444	16	–	17	.485
St. Bonaventure	8	–	10	.444	14	–	18	.438
Richmond	7	–	11	.389	15	–	18	.455
La Salle	7	–	11	.389	15	–	19	.441
Massachusetts	6	–	12	.333	15	–	16	.484
Rhode Island	5	–	13	.278	9	–	22	.290
Loyola Chicago	4	–	14	.222	10	–	21	.323
† 2023 A10 tournament winner

2022–23 ACC men's basketball standings
	Conf.				Overall
Team	W		L	PCT	W		L	PCT
No. 16 Miami (FL)	15	–	5	.750	29	–	8	.784
No. 14 Virginia	15	–	5	.750	25	–	8	.758
Clemson	14	–	6	.700	23	–	11	.676
No. 12 Duke †	14	–	6	.700	27	–	9	.750
Pittsburgh	14	–	6	.700	24	–	12	.667
NC State	12	–	8	.600	23	–	11	.676
North Carolina	11	–	9	.550	20	–	13	.606
Wake Forest	10	–	10	.500	19	–	14	.576
Syracuse	10	–	10	.500	17	–	15	.531
Boston College	9	–	11	.450	16	–	17	.485
Virginia Tech	8	–	12	.400	19	–	15	.559
Florida State	7	–	13	.350	9	–	23	.281
Georgia Tech	6	–	14	.300	15	–	18	.455
Notre Dame	3	–	17	.150	11	–	21	.344
Louisville	2	–	18	.100	4	–	28	.125
† 2023 ACC tournament winner Rankings from AP poll

2022–23 ASUN men's basketball standings
	Conf.				Overall
Team	W		L	PCT	W		L	PCT
Kennesaw State †	15	–	3	.833	26	–	9	.743
Liberty	15	–	3	.833	27	–	9	.750
Eastern Kentucky	12	–	6	.667	23	–	14	.622
Stetson	12	–	6	.667	17	–	14	.548
Lipscomb	11	–	7	.611	20	–	13	.606
North Alabama	10	–	8	.556	18	–	15	.545
North Florida	9	–	9	.500	14	–	17	.452
Bellarmine*	9	–	9	.500	15	–	18	.455
Queens*	7	–	11	.389	18	–	15	.545
Florida Gulf Coast	7	–	11	.389	17	–	15	.531
Jacksonville	6	–	12	.333	13	–	16	.448
Jacksonville State	6	–	12	.333	13	–	18	.419
Central Arkansas	4	–	14	.222	9	–	22	.290
Austin Peay	3	–	15	.167	9	–	22	.290
† 2023 ASUN tournament winner * Ineligible for the 2023 NCAA tournament due to transition from Division II

2022–23 Big 12 men's basketball standings
	Conf.				Overall
Team	W		L	PCT	W		L	PCT
No. 4 Kansas	13	–	5	.722	28	–	8	.778
No. 5 Texas †	12	–	6	.667	29	–	9	.763
No. 15 Kansas State	11	–	7	.611	26	–	10	.722
No. 11 Baylor	11	–	7	.611	23	–	11	.676
Iowa State	9	–	9	.500	19	–	14	.576
No. 22 TCU	9	–	9	.500	22	–	13	.629
Oklahoma State	8	–	10	.444	20	–	16	.556
West Virginia	7	–	11	.389	19	–	15	.559
Texas Tech	5	–	13	.278	16	–	16	.500
Oklahoma	5	–	13	.278	15	–	17	.469
† 2023 Big 12 tournament winner Rankings from AP poll

2022–23 Big East men's basketball standings
	Conf.				Overall
Team	W		L	PCT	W		L	PCT
No. 6 Marquette †	17	–	3	.850	29	–	7	.806
No. 13 Xavier	15	–	5	.750	27	–	10	.730
Creighton	14	–	6	.700	24	–	13	.649
No. 10 UConn	13	–	7	.650	31	–	8	.795
Providence	13	–	7	.650	21	–	12	.636
Villanova	10	–	10	.500	17	–	17	.500
Seton Hall	10	–	10	.500	17	–	16	.515
St. John's	7	–	13	.350	18	–	15	.545
Butler	6	–	14	.300	14	–	18	.438
DePaul	3	–	17	.150	10	–	23	.303
Georgetown	2	–	18	.100	7	–	25	.219
† 2023 Big East tournament winner Rankings from AP poll

2022–23 Big Sky men's basketball standings
	Conf.				Overall
Team	W		L	PCT	W		L	PCT
Eastern Washington	16	–	2	.889	23	–	11	.676
Montana State †	15	–	3	.833	25	–	10	.714
Weber State	12	–	6	.667	18	–	15	.545
Montana	10	–	7	.588	17	–	14	.548
Idaho State	8	–	10	.444	11	–	21	.344
Sacramento State	7	–	11	.389	14	–	18	.438
Portland State	6	–	11	.353	12	–	19	.387
Northern Colorado	6	–	12	.333	12	–	20	.375
Northern Arizona	5	–	13	.278	12	–	23	.343
Idaho	4	–	14	.222	10	–	22	.313
† Conference tournament winner

2022–23 Big South men's basketball standings
	Conf.				Overall
Team	W		L	PCT	W		L	PCT
UNC Asheville †	16	–	2	.889	27	–	8	.771
Longwood	12	–	6	.667	20	–	12	.625
Radford	12	–	6	.667	21	–	15	.583
USC Upstate	10	–	8	.556	16	–	16	.500
Gardner–Webb	10	–	8	.556	15	–	16	.484
Winthrop	10	–	8	.556	15	–	17	.469
Campbell	8	–	10	.444	16	–	18	.471
High Point	6	–	12	.333	14	–	17	.452
Charleston Southern	5	–	13	.278	10	–	21	.323
Presbyterian	1	–	17	.056	5	–	27	.156
† 2023 Big South tournament winner

2022–23 Big Ten Conference men's basketball standings
	Conf.				Overall
Team	W		L	PCT	W		L	PCT
No. 3 Purdue †	15	–	5	.750	29	–	6	.829
No. 21 Indiana	12	–	8	.600	23	–	12	.657
Northwestern	12	–	8	.600	22	–	12	.647
Michigan State	11	–	8	.579	21	–	13	.618
Maryland	11	–	9	.550	22	–	13	.629
Illinois	11	–	9	.550	20	–	13	.606
Iowa	11	–	9	.550	19	–	14	.576
Michigan	11	–	9	.550	18	–	16	.529
Penn State	10	–	10	.500	23	–	14	.622
Rutgers	10	–	10	.500	19	–	15	.559
Wisconsin	9	–	11	.450	20	–	15	.571
Nebraska	9	–	11	.450	16	–	16	.500
Ohio State	5	–	15	.250	16	–	19	.457
Minnesota	2	–	17	.105	9	–	22	.290
† Conference tournament winner Rankings from AP poll

2022–23 Big West men's basketball standings
	Conf.				Overall
Team	W		L	PCT	W		L	PCT
UC Santa Barbara †	15	–	5	.750	27	–	8	.771
UC Irvine	15	–	5	.750	23	–	12	.657
UC Riverside	14	–	6	.700	22	–	12	.647
Cal State Fullerton	12	–	6	.667	20	–	13	.606
Hawai'i	13	–	7	.650	22	–	11	.667
UC Davis	11	–	8	.579	18	–	14	.563
Long Beach State	11	–	9	.550	17	–	16	.515
Cal State Bakersfield	6	–	14	.300	11	–	22	.333
UC San Diego*	5	–	13	.278	10	–	20	.333
Cal State Northridge	4	–	16	.200	7	–	25	.219
Cal Poly	1	–	18	.053	8	–	25	.242
† 2023 Big West tournament winner * ineligible for the 2023 NCAA tournament due to transition period

2022–23 CAA men's basketball standings
	Conf.				Overall
Team	W		L	PCT	W		L	PCT
Hofstra	16	–	2	.889	25	–	10	.714
Charleston †	16	–	2	.889	31	–	4	.886
Towson	12	–	6	.667	21	–	12	.636
UNC Wilmington	12	–	6	.667	24	–	10	.706
Drexel	10	–	8	.556	17	–	15	.531
Delaware	8	–	10	.444	17	–	16	.515
North Carolina A&T	8	–	10	.444	13	–	19	.406
William & Mary	7	–	11	.389	13	–	20	.394
Elon	6	–	12	.333	8	–	24	.250
Stony Brook	6	–	12	.333	11	–	22	.333
Northeastern	6	–	12	.333	10	–	20	.333
Hampton	5	–	13	.278	8	–	24	.250
Monmouth	5	–	13	.278	7	–	26	.212
† 2023 CAA tournament winner

2022–23 Conference USA men's basketball standings
	Conf.				Overall
Team	W		L	PCT	W		L	PCT
No. 25 Florida Atlantic †	18	–	2	.900	35	–	4	.897
North Texas	16	–	4	.800	31	–	7	.816
UAB	14	–	6	.700	29	–	10	.744
Middle Tennessee	11	–	9	.550	19	–	14	.576
Charlotte	9	–	11	.450	22	–	14	.611
Rice	8	–	12	.400	19	–	16	.543
FIU	8	–	12	.400	14	–	18	.438
Western Kentucky	8	–	12	.400	17	–	16	.515
UTEP	7	–	13	.350	14	–	18	.438
Louisiana Tech	7	–	13	.350	15	–	18	.455
UTSA	4	–	16	.200	10	–	22	.313
† 2023 C-USA tournament winner Rankings from AP poll

2022–23 Horizon League men's basketball standings
	Conf.				Overall
Team	W		L	PCT	W		L	PCT
Youngstown State	15	–	5	.750	24	–	10	.706
Milwaukee	14	–	6	.700	22	–	12	.647
Cleveland State	14	–	6	.700	21	–	14	.600
Northern Kentucky †	14	–	6	.700	22	–	13	.629
Oakland	11	–	9	.550	13	–	19	.406
Wright State	10	–	10	.500	18	–	15	.545
Robert Morris	10	–	10	.500	16	–	17	.485
Detroit Mercy	9	–	11	.450	14	–	19	.424
Purdue Fort Wayne	9	–	11	.450	17	–	15	.531
IUPUI	2	–	18	.100	5	–	27	.156
Green Bay	2	–	18	.100	3	–	29	.094
† 2023 Horizon League tournament winner

2022–23 Ivy League men's basketball standings
	Conf.				Overall
Team	W		L	PCT	W		L	PCT
Yale	10	–	4	.714	21	–	9	.700
Princeton †	10	–	4	.714	23	–	9	.719
Penn	9	–	5	.643	17	–	13	.567
Cornell	7	–	7	.500	17	–	11	.607
Brown	7	–	7	.500	14	–	13	.519
Dartmouth	6	–	8	.429	10	–	18	.357
Harvard	5	–	9	.357	14	–	14	.500
Columbia	2	–	12	.143	7	–	22	.241
† 2023 Ivy League tournament winner

2022–23 MAAC men's basketball standings
	Conf.				Overall
Team	W		L	PCT	W		L	PCT
Iona †	17	–	3	.850	27	–	8	.771
Rider	13	–	7	.650	16	–	14	.533
Quinnipiac	11	–	9	.550	20	–	12	.625
Siena	11	–	9	.550	17	–	15	.531
Niagara	10	–	10	.500	16	–	15	.516
Manhattan	10	–	10	.500	12	–	18	.400
Fairfield	9	–	11	.450	13	–	18	.419
Mount St. Mary's	8	–	12	.400	13	–	20	.394
Canisius	8	–	12	.400	10	–	20	.333
Saint Peter's	7	–	13	.350	14	–	18	.438
Marist	6	–	14	.300	13	–	20	.394
† 2023 MAAC tournament winner

2022–23 Mid-American Conference men's basketball standings
	Conf.				Overall
Team	W		L	PCT	W		L	PCT
Toledo	16	–	2	.889	27	–	8	.771
Kent State †	15	–	3	.833	28	–	7	.800
Akron	13	–	5	.722	22	–	11	.667
Ball State	11	–	7	.611	20	–	12	.625
Ohio	10	–	8	.556	19	–	14	.576
Buffalo	9	–	9	.500	15	–	17	.469
Northern Illinois	9	–	9	.500	13	–	19	.406
Miami (OH)	6	–	12	.333	12	–	20	.375
Bowling Green	5	–	13	.278	11	–	20	.355
Eastern Michigan	5	–	13	.278	8	–	23	.258
Central Michigan	5	–	13	.278	10	–	21	.323
Western Michigan	4	–	14	.222	8	–	23	.258
† 2023 MAC tournament winner

2022–23 MEAC men's basketball standings
	Conf.				Overall
Team	W		L	PCT	W		L	PCT
Howard †	11	–	3	.786	22	–	13	.629
North Carolina Central	10	–	4	.714	18	–	12	.600
Norfolk State	9	–	5	.643	22	–	11	.667
Maryland Eastern Shore	9	–	5	.643	18	–	13	.581
Morgan State	7	–	7	.500	15	–	16	.484
Coppin State	4	–	10	.286	9	–	23	.281
Delaware State	4	–	10	.286	6	–	24	.200
South Carolina State	2	–	12	.143	5	–	26	.161
† 2023 MEAC tournament winner

2022–23 Missouri Valley Conference men's basketball standings
	Conf.				Overall
Team	W		L	PCT	W		L	PCT
Bradley	16	–	4	.800	25	–	10	.714
Drake †	15	–	5	.750	27	–	8	.771
Southern Illinois	14	–	6	.700	23	–	10	.697
Belmont	14	–	6	.700	21	–	11	.656
Indiana State	13	–	7	.650	23	–	13	.639
Missouri State	12	–	8	.600	17	–	15	.531
Murray State	11	–	9	.550	17	–	15	.531
Northern Iowa	9	–	11	.450	14	–	18	.438
Illinois State	6	–	14	.300	11	–	21	.344
Valparaiso	5	–	15	.250	11	–	21	.344
UIC	4	–	16	.200	12	–	20	.375
Evansville	1	–	19	.050	5	–	27	.156
† 2023 MVC tournament winner

2022–23 Mountain West Conference men's basketball standings
	Conf.				Overall
Team	W		L	PCT	W		L	PCT
No. 18 San Diego State †	15	–	3	.833	32	–	7	.821
Boise State	13	–	5	.722	24	–	10	.706
Utah State	13	–	5	.722	26	–	9	.743
Nevada	12	–	6	.667	22	–	11	.667
San Jose State	10	–	8	.556	21	–	14	.600
New Mexico	8	–	10	.444	22	–	12	.647
UNLV	7	–	11	.389	19	–	13	.594
Colorado State	6	–	12	.333	15	–	18	.455
Fresno State	6	–	12	.333	11	–	20	.355
Air Force	5	–	13	.278	14	–	18	.438
Wyoming	4	–	14	.222	9	–	22	.290
† Conference tournament winner Rankings from AP poll

2022–23 NCAA Division I men's basketball independents standings
	Conf.				Overall
Team	W		L	PCT	W		L	PCT
Chicago State		–		–	11	–	20	.355
Hartford		–		–	5	–	23	.179

2022–23 Northeast Conference men's basketball standings
	Conf.				Overall
Team	W		L	PCT	W		L	PCT
Merrimack*†	12	–	4	.750	18	–	16	.529
Fairleigh Dickinson^	10	–	6	.625	21	–	16	.568
Stonehill**	10	–	6	.625	14	–	17	.452
Saint Francis (PA)	9	–	7	.563	13	–	18	.419
Sacred Heart	8	–	8	.500	16	–	17	.485
Wagner	8	–	8	.500	15	–	13	.536
Central Connecticut	7	–	9	.438	10	–	22	.313
St. Francis Brooklyn	7	–	9	.438	14	–	16	.467
LIU	1	–	15	.063	3	–	26	.103
† 2023 NEC tournament winner: * ineligible for the 2023 NCAA tournament due to transition period; ** ineligible for both the 2023 NEC tournament and the 2023 NCAA tournament due to transition period; ^ received automatic bid for the 2023 NCAA tournament as conference tournament runner-up, due to Merrimack's ineligibility

2022–23 Ohio Valley Conference men's basketball standings
	Conf.				Overall
Team	W		L	PCT	W		L	PCT
Morehead State	14	–	4	.778	22	–	12	.647
Tennessee Tech	11	–	7	.611	16	–	17	.485
UT Martin	10	–	8	.556	19	–	14	.576
Tennessee State	10	–	8	.556	18	–	14	.563
Southeast Missouri State †	10	–	8	.556	19	–	17	.528
SIU Edwardsville	9	–	9	.500	19	–	14	.576
Southern Indiana*	9	–	9	.500	16	–	17	.485
Lindenwood*	6	–	12	.333	11	–	21	.344
Little Rock	6	–	12	.333	10	–	21	.323
Eastern Illinois	5	–	13	.278	9	–	22	.290
† 2023 OVC tournament winner * ineligible for the 2023 NCAA tournament due to transition period

2022–23 Pac-12 Conference men's basketball standings
	Conf.				Overall
Team	W		L	PCT	W		L	PCT
No. 7 UCLA	18	–	2	.900	31	–	6	.838
No. 8 Arizona†	14	–	6	.700	28	–	7	.800
USC	14	–	6	.700	22	–	11	.667
Oregon	12	–	8	.600	21	–	15	.583
Arizona State	11	–	9	.550	23	–	13	.639
Washington State	11	–	9	.550	17	–	17	.500
Utah	10	–	10	.500	17	–	15	.531
Washington	8	–	12	.400	16	–	16	.500
Colorado	8	–	12	.400	18	–	17	.514
Stanford	7	–	13	.350	14	–	19	.424
Oregon State	5	–	15	.250	11	–	21	.344
California	2	–	18	.100	3	–	29	.094
† Conference tournament winner Rankings from AP poll

2022–23 Patriot League men's basketball standings
	Conf.				Overall
Team	W		L	PCT	W		L	PCT
Colgate†	17	–	1	.944	26	–	9	.743
Navy	11	–	7	.611	18	–	13	.581
Lehigh	11	–	7	.611	16	–	14	.533
Army	10	–	8	.556	17	–	16	.515
Boston University	8	–	10	.444	15	–	17	.469
Lafayette	7	–	11	.389	11	–	23	.324
American	7	–	11	.389	17	–	15	.531
Loyola	7	–	11	.389	13	–	20	.394
Holy Cross	7	–	11	.389	10	–	22	.313
Bucknell	5	–	13	.278	12	–	20	.375
† 2023 Patriot League tournament winner

2022–23 Southeastern Conference men's basketball standings
	Conf.				Overall
Team	W		L	PCT	W		L	PCT
No. 1 Alabama†	16	–	2	.889	31	–	6	.838
No. 17 Texas A&M	15	–	3	.833	25	–	10	.714
Kentucky	12	–	6	.667	22	–	12	.647
No. 23 Missouri	11	–	7	.611	25	–	10	.714
No. 20 Tennessee	11	–	7	.611	25	–	11	.694
Vanderbilt	11	–	7	.611	22	–	15	.595
Auburn	10	–	8	.556	21	–	13	.618
Florida	9	–	9	.500	16	–	17	.485
Mississippi State	8	–	10	.444	21	–	13	.618
Arkansas	8	–	10	.444	22	–	14	.611
Georgia	6	–	12	.333	16	–	16	.500
South Carolina	4	–	14	.222	11	–	21	.344
Ole Miss	3	–	15	.167	12	–	21	.364
LSU	2	–	16	.111	14	–	19	.424
† 2023 SEC tournament winner Rankings from AP poll

2022–23 SWAC men's basketball standings
	Conf.				Overall
Team	W		L	PCT	W		L	PCT
Alcorn State	15	–	3	.833	18	–	14	.563
Grambling State	15	–	3	.833	24	–	9	.727
Jackson State	12	–	6	.667	14	–	19	.424
Southern	11	–	7	.611	15	–	17	.469
Alabama A&M	10	–	8	.556	15	–	18	.455
Prairie View A&M	9	–	9	.500	13	–	19	.406
Bethune–Cookman	8	–	10	.444	12	–	20	.375
Texas Southern †	7	–	11	.389	14	–	21	.400
Alabama State	6	–	12	.333	8	–	23	.258
Arkansas–Pine Bluff	6	–	12	.333	10	–	21	.323
Florida A&M	5	–	13	.278	7	–	22	.241
Mississippi Valley State	4	–	14	.222	5	–	27	.156
† 2023 SWAC tournament winner

2022–23 Southern Conference men's basketball standings
	Conf.				Overall
Team	W		L	PCT	W		L	PCT
Furman †	15	–	3	.833	28	–	8	.778
Samford	15	–	3	.833	21	–	11	.656
UNC Greensboro	14	–	4	.778	20	–	12	.625
Western Carolina	10	–	8	.556	18	–	16	.529
East Tennessee State	8	–	10	.444	12	–	20	.375
Wofford	8	–	10	.444	17	–	16	.515
Chattanooga	7	–	11	.389	18	–	17	.514
Mercer	6	–	12	.333	14	–	19	.424
The Citadel	5	–	13	.278	10	–	22	.313
VMI	2	–	16	.111	7	–	25	.219
† 2023 SoCon tournament winner

2022–23 Southland Conference men's basketball standings
	Conf.				Overall
Team	W		L	PCT	W		L	PCT
Texas A&M–Corpus Christi †	14	–	4	.778	24	–	11	.686
Northwestern State	13	–	5	.722	22	–	11	.667
Southeastern Louisiana	12	–	6	.667	18	–	14	.563
Nicholls	11	–	7	.611	16	–	15	.516
Texas A&M–Commerce*	9	–	9	.500	13	–	20	.394
Houston Christian	7	–	11	.389	10	–	22	.313
New Orleans	7	–	11	.389	12	–	20	.375
McNeese	6	–	12	.333	11	–	23	.324
Incarnate Word	6	–	12	.333	12	–	19	.387
Lamar	5	–	13	.278	9	–	22	.290
† 2023 Southland tournament winner * ineligible for the 2023 NCAA tournament due to transition period

2022–23 Summit League men's basketball standings
	Conf.				Overall
Team	W		L	PCT	W		L	PCT
Oral Roberts †	18	–	0	1.000	30	–	5	.857
South Dakota State	13	–	5	.722	19	–	13	.594
North Dakota State	11	–	7	.611	16	–	17	.485
Western Illinois	9	–	9	.500	16	–	14	.533
St. Thomas *	9	–	9	.500	19	–	14	.576
South Dakota	7	–	11	.389	12	–	19	.387
Kansas City	7	–	11	.389	11	–	21	.344
Denver	6	–	12	.333	15	–	17	.469
North Dakota	6	–	12	.333	13	–	20	.394
Omaha	4	–	14	.222	9	–	23	.281
† 2023 Summit League tournament winner * Ineligible for the 2023 NCAA tournament due to transition from Division III

2022–23 Sun Belt Conference men's basketball standings
	Conf.				Overall
Team	W		L	PCT	W		L	PCT
Southern Miss	14	–	4	.778	25	–	8	.758
Louisiana †	13	–	5	.722	26	–	8	.765
Marshall	13	–	5	.722	24	–	8	.750
James Madison	12	–	6	.667	22	–	11	.667
Troy	11	–	7	.611	20	–	13	.606
Old Dominion	11	–	7	.611	19	–	12	.613
Georgia Southern	9	–	9	.500	17	–	16	.515
South Alabama	9	–	9	.500	19	–	16	.543
Appalachian State	9	–	9	.500	16	–	16	.500
Louisiana–Monroe	7	–	11	.389	11	–	21	.344
Texas State	6	–	12	.333	16	–	19	.457
Coastal Carolina	5	–	13	.278	11	–	20	.355
Arkansas State	4	–	14	.222	13	–	20	.394
Georgia State	3	–	15	.167	10	–	21	.323
† 2023 Sun Belt Tournament winner

2022–23 WAC men's basketball standings
	Conf.				Overall
Team	W		L	PCT	W		L	PCT
Utah Valley	15	–	3	.833	28	–	9	.757
Sam Houston	14	–	4	.778	26	–	8	.765
Southern Utah	12	–	6	.667	24	–	13	.649
Grand Canyon †	11	–	7	.611	24	–	12	.667
Seattle	11	–	7	.611	20	–	12	.625
Stephen F. Austin	11	–	7	.611	19	–	13	.594
Tarleton State *	9	–	9	.500	17	–	17	.500
California Baptist	8	–	10	.444	17	–	16	.515
Abilene Christian	7	–	11	.389	13	–	17	.433
UT Rio Grande Valley	6	–	12	.333	15	–	17	.469
UT Arlington	6	–	12	.333	11	–	21	.344
Utah Tech *	5	–	13	.278	14	–	19	.424
New Mexico State **	2	–	16	.111	9	–	15	.375
† Conference tournament winner * Ineligible for the NCAA tournament due to transition from NCAA Division II ** Remaining games as of February 11, 2023 cancelled.

2022–23 West Coast Conference men's basketball standings
	Conf.				Overall
Team	W		L	PCT	W		L	PCT
No. 19 Saint Mary's	14	–	2	.875	27	–	8	.771
No. 9 Gonzaga†	14	–	2	.875	31	–	6	.838
Santa Clara	11	–	5	.688	23	–	10	.697
Loyola Marymount	9	–	7	.563	19	–	12	.613
San Francisco	7	–	9	.438	20	–	14	.588
BYU	7	–	9	.438	19	–	15	.559
Pacific	7	–	9	.438	15	–	18	.455
Portland	5	–	11	.313	14	–	19	.424
San Diego	4	–	12	.250	11	–	20	.355
Pepperdine	2	–	14	.125	9	–	22	.290
† 2023 WCC tournament winner Rankings from AP poll

== Award winners ==
=== 2023 consensus All-Americans ===
Consensus First Team
Player	Position	Class	Team
Zach Edey	C	Junior	Purdue
Trayce Jackson-Davis	PF	Junior	Indiana
Marcus Sasser	G	Senior	Houston
Drew Timme	PF	Senior	Gonzaga
Jalen Wilson	PF	Junior	Kansas

Consensus Second Team
Player	Position	Class	Team
Jaime Jaquez Jr.	SF/SG	Senior	UCLA
Brandon Miller	SF	Freshman	Alabama
Jalen Pickett	PG	Graduate	Penn State
Oscar Tshiebwe	PF/C	Senior	Kentucky
Ąžuolas Tubelis	PF	Junior	Arizona

=== Major player of the year awards ===
- Wooden Award: Zach Edey, Purdue
- Naismith Award: Zach Edey, Purdue
- Associated Press Player of the Year: Zach Edey, Purdue
- NABC Player of the Year: Zach Edey, Purdue
- Oscar Robertson Trophy (USBWA): Zach Edey, Purdue
- Sporting News Player of the Year: Zach Edey, Purdue

=== Major freshman of the year awards ===
- Wayman Tisdale Award (USBWA): Brandon Miller, Alabama
- NABC Freshman of the Year: Brandon Miller, Alabama

=== Major coach of the year awards ===
- Associated Press Coach of the Year: Shaka Smart, Marquette
- Henry Iba Award (USBWA): Shaka Smart, Marquette
- NABC Coach of the Year: Shaka Smart, Marquette
- Naismith College Coach of the Year: Jerome Tang, Kansas State
- Sporting News Coach of the Year: Rodney Terry, Texas

=== Other major awards ===
- Naismith Starting Five:
  - Bob Cousy Award (best point guard): Markquis Nowell, Kansas State
  - Jerry West Award (best shooting guard): Marcus Sasser, Houston
  - Julius Erving Award (best small forward): Jalen Wilson, Kansas
  - Karl Malone Award (best power forward): Trayce Jackson-Davis, Indiana
  - Kareem Abdul-Jabbar Award (best center): Zach Edey, Purdue
- Pete Newell Big Man Award (best big man): Zach Edey, Purdue
- NABC Defensive Player of the Year: Jaylen Clark, UCLA
- Naismith Defensive Player of the Year: Jaylen Clark, UCLA
- Lute Olson Award: Jaime Jaquez Jr., UCLA
- Robert V. Geasey Trophy (top player in Philadelphia Big 5): Jordan Dingle, Penn
- Haggerty Award (top player in NYC metro area): Aaron Estrada, Hofstra
- Ben Jobe Award (top minority coach): Jerry Stackhouse, Vanderbilt
- Hugh Durham Award (top mid-major coach): Amir Abdur-Rahim, Kennesaw State
- Jim Phelan Award (top head coach): Chris Collins, Northwestern
- Lefty Driesell Award (top defensive player): Caleb McConnell, Rutgers
- Lou Henson Award (top mid-major player): Jordan Brown, Louisiana
- Skip Prosser Man of the Year Award (coach with moral character): Pat Skerry, Towson
- Academic All-American of the Year (top scholar-athlete): Ben Vander Plas, Virginia
- Elite 90 Award (top GPA among upperclass players at Final Four): Filippos Gkogkos, Miami
- Perry Wallace Most Courageous Award: Terrence Hargrove, Saint Louis & Connor Odom, Utah State

== Coaching changes ==
Many teams will change coaches during the season and after it ends. Two teams changed coaches shortly before their first regular-season games. This is restricted to coaching changes prior to the start of practice for the next season; for changes after that date, see the 2023–24 season page.

Team	Former	Interim	New	Reason
American	Mike Brennan		Duane Simpkins	American parted ways with Brennan on March 9, 2023, after 10 seasons, in which the Eagles went 125–166 overall, including making the 2014 NCAA tournament in Brennan's first year, but had not been to a postseason tournament since then. George Mason assistant coach Simpkins was hired as his replacement on April 1.
Arkansas State	Mike Balado		Bryan Hodgson	Arkansas State parted ways with Balado on March 16, 2023, after 6 seasons and an 82–100 record. Alabama assistant coach Hodgson was hired by the Red Wolves on March 22.
Army	Jimmy Allen		Kevin Kuwik	Allen and West Point mutually agreed to part ways on March 8, 2023, after 7 seasons, in which the Black Knights went 98–112. Butler assistant Kuwik was hired by the Black Knights on March 29.
Austin Peay	Nate James		Corey Gipson	James was fired on March 5, 2023, after 2 seasons and a 21–39 record at Austin Peay. Northwestern State head coach Gipson, an alumnus and former assistant coach of Peay, was hired by the Governors on March 12.
Bowling Green	Michael Huger		Todd Simon	Bowling Green fired Huger on March 5, 2023, after 8 seasons and a 126–125 record. Southern Utah head coach Simon was hired by the Falcons on March 15.
Bucknell	Nathan Davis		John Griffin III	Bucknell parted ways with Davis on March 2, 2023, after 8 seasons with a 129–115 record. St. Joseph's associate head coach and former Bison star player Griffin was hired on March 21.
Buffalo	Jim Whitesell		George Halcovage	Despite a 70–49 overall record and 45–27 record in conference play in 4 seasons, Buffalo parted ways with Whitesell on March 11, 2023. The Bulls hired Villanova associate head coach George Halcovage on March 30.
California	Mark Fox		Mark Madsen	California fired Fox on March 6, 2023, after 4 seasons, in which the Golden Bears went 38-87 overall, including a school-worst 3–29 record in 2022–23. Cal hired Mark Madsen from Utah Valley as its 19th head coach on March 29.
Cal State Northridge	Trent Johnson		Andy Newman	CSUN parted ways with Johnson on March 29, 2023, after a 14–48 record in 2 seasons. D2 Cal State San Bernardino head coach Newman was hired by the Matadors on April 15.
Charlotte	Ron Sanchez	Aaron Fearne		Sanchez announced his resignation from Charlotte on June 6, 2023, after 5 seasons to return to Virginia, where he had previously spent nine seasons on Tony Bennett's staff, to become Bennett's top assistant, leaving with a 72–78 record. 49ers associate head coach Fearne, who was initially named interim head coach following Sanchez's departure, continued in that role for the first 23 games of the 2023–24 season until the school removed the interim tag and officially named him head coach on February 12, 2024.
Coppin State	Juan Dixon		Larry Stewart	Coppin State parted ways with Dixon on March 14, 2023, after 6 seasons and a 51–131 record. Morgan State assistant and former Eagle star player Stewart was hired on May 2.
East Tennessee State	Desmond Oliver		Brooks Savage	ETSU parted ways with Oliver on March 10, 2023, after 2 seasons and a 27–37 record. Wake Forest assistant coach Savage, a former assistant with the Buccaneers from 2015 to 2020, was hired on March 20.
Fairleigh Dickinson	Tobin Anderson		Jack Castleberry	Anderson left FDU on March 21, 2023, after leading the Knights to an unlikely run in the NCAA tournament in his only season there for the Iona head coaching job. Hours after Anderson's departure, top assistant Castleberry was promoted to head coach.
George Mason	Kim English		Tony Skinn	English left George Mason on March 23, 2023, after 2 seasons for the Providence job. Maryland assistant Skinn, a George Mason alum and member of the 2006 Final Four team, was hired by the Patriots on March 30.
Georgetown	Patrick Ewing		Ed Cooley	Georgetown parted ways with the former Hoya star player and Basketball Hall of Famer on March 9, 2023, after 6 seasons. Under Ewing, the team went 75–109, including back-to-back last place finishes in the Big East Conference after making the NCAA tournament in 2021. The school hired Ed Cooley from conference rival Providence on March 20.
Georgia Southern	Brian Burg		Charlie Henry	Georgia Southern announced, on March 9, 2023, that Burg's contract would not be renewed, ending his three-year tenure with a 42–44 record. The Eagles hired Alabama assistant Henry as his replacement on March 15.
Georgia Tech	Josh Pastner		Damon Stoudamire	Pastner was fired from Georgia Tech on March 10, 2023, after 7 seasons and a 109–114 record with 1 NCAA tournament appearance. The Yellow Jackets hired Boston Celtics assistant and former Pacific head coach Stoudamire as his replacement on March 13.
Green Bay	Will Ryan	Freddie Owens	Sundance Wicks	Green Bay parted ways with Ryan on January 24, 2023, after a 15–61 record in 2½ seasons, including a 2–19 record this season. Assistant coach Owens was named interim head coach of the Phoenix for the remainder of the season. After the end of the season, Green Bay hired Wyoming assistant coach Wicks as his replacement on March 14.
Hartford	John Gallagher	Tom Devitt	Aaron Toomey	Gallagher resigned from Hartford on November 7, 2022, one night before its season-opening game. Heading into Hartford's lone season as an NCAA Division I independent, Gallagher wrote in his resignation letter that budget cuts from the school's decision to transition to Division III athletics and safety concerns were the reasons for his decision. He also said that his 12-year tenure at the school began to "unravel" piece by piece, and while he could "write a book" about it all, he will look back at the positives. Assistant coach Tom Devitt was appointed the interim head coach of the Hawks for 2022–23. After the season, the school hired Rochester assistant Toomey on April 21.
High Point	G. G. Smith		Alan Huss	High Point fired G. G. Smith on March 3, 2023, after finishing 14–17 in his first full season as head coach, having taken over for his father Tubby near the end of last season. Creighton associate head coach Huss was hired by the Panthers on March 27.
Holy Cross	Brett Nelson		Dave Paulsen	Holy Cross parted ways with Nelson on March 10, 2023, after 4 seasons and a 27–84 record. Fordham assistant Paulsen, formerly head coach at Bucknell and George Mason, was hired by the Crusaders on March 28.
Idaho	Zac Claus	Tim Marrion	Alex Pribble	Shortly after their loss to Montana in the regular season finale, Idaho announced on February 27, 2023, that they had parted ways with Claus after 4 seasons and a 28–88 overall record. Vandals assistant coach Marrion was named interim head coach of the team for the conference tournament. On March 16, the school hired Seattle associate head coach Pribble as its new coach.
Incarnate Word	Carson Cunningham		Shane Heirman	Incarnate Word fired Cunningham on April 12, 2023, after a 42–105 record in 5 seasons. Central Michigan associate head coach Heirman was hired by the Cardinals on May 5.
Iona	Rick Pitino		Tobin Anderson	Pitino left Iona on March 20, 2023, after 3 seasons for St. John's, marking his return to coaching in the Big East Conference after 10 years. Fairleigh Dickinson head coach Anderson, whose team upset top-seeded Purdue in the NCAA tournament round of 64, was hired by the Gaels the following day.
Kennesaw State	Amir Abdur-Rahim		Antoine Pettway	After an impressive turnaround season, Abdur-Rahim left Kennesaw State on March 29, 2023, after 4 seasons to accept the South Florida job. Alabama assistant Pettway was hired by the Owls on April 7.
Lafayette	Mike Jordan		Mike McGarvey	Lafayette dismissed Jordan on March 29, 2023, after a single season. He had been on paid leave since February following an investigation into a complaint about his work as head coach. Associate head coach McGarvey, who was serving as the Leopards' interim head coach during Jordan's initial leave, was officially promoted to the head coaching position.
Manhattan	Steve Masiello	RaShawn Stores	John Gallagher	Masiello was dismissed on October 25, 2022, less than two weeks before Manhattan's 2022–23 season opener. In 11 seasons as head coach, he had an overall record of 162–177; while he had led the Jaspers to the 2014 and 2015 NCAA tournaments, they never again finished a season above .500. Top assistant Stores, who had played on both of Masiello's NCAA tournament teams, was named as interim head coach of the team for 2022–23. After the season ended, the school hired former Hartford head coach Gallagher on March 29, 2023.
McNeese	John Aiken		Will Wade	McNeese parted ways with Aiken on March 8, 2023, after 2 seasons and a 22–45 record. Since Aiken was under contract for 1 more year with the school, he will be paid for that year until April 2024. Former LSU head coach Will Wade, who was accused of five Level I violations by the NCAA, was hired by the Cowboys on March 12.
Montana State	Danny Sprinkle		Matt Logie	Sprinkle left his alma mater on April 7, 2023, after 4 seasons for the Utah State job. Logie, head coach at D2 Point Loma Nazarene, was hired by the Bobcats on April 17.
New Hampshire	Bill Herrion		Nathan Davis	New Hampshire announced on March 14, 2023, that Herrion's contract would not be renewed, ending his tenure after 18 seasons, in which the Wildcats went 227–303 overall. Former Bucknell head coach Davis was hired on April 7.
New Mexico State	Greg Heiar		Jason Hooten	New Mexico State fired Heiar on February 14, 2023, after a single season amid the Aggies canceling the rest of their season due to hazing incidents within the program. On March 24, the school hired Hooten from Sam Houston, set to join NMSU in Conference USA after this season.
Nicholls	Austin Claunch		Tevon Saddler	Claunch left Nicholls on April 15, 2023, after 5 seasons for an assistant coaching position at Alabama. Maryland director of player personnel and former Colonel player Saddler was hired on April 20.
NJIT	Brian Kennedy		Grant Billmeier	Kennedy resigned from NJIT on March 6, 2023, after an 81–123 record during his 7-year tenure. The Highlanders hired Maryland assistant Billmeier on April 6.
North Texas	Grant McCasland		Ross Hodge	After winning the NIT, McCasland left North Texas on March 31, 2023, after 6 seasons for the Texas Tech head coaching job. Mean Green associate head coach Hodge was promoted to the position on April 2.
Northwestern State	Corey Gipson		Rick Cabrera	Gipson left Northwestern State on March 12, 2023, less than a year after being hired, to become the head coach at his alma mater, Austin Peay. Cabrera, head coach at Tallahassee CC of the NJCAA, was hired by the Demons on March 22.
Notre Dame	Mike Brey		Micah Shrewsberry	Brey announced on January 19, 2023, that he will step down after the 2022–23 season, his 23rd with Notre Dame. Brey led the Fighting Irish to 483 wins, the most ever in the men's program, and to 13 NCAA tournaments. Penn State head coach and Indiana native Shrewsberry was hired as his replacement on March 23.
Ole Miss	Kermit Davis	Win Case	Chris Beard	Ole Miss fired Davis, who was in his 5th season as head coach, on February 24, 2023, after a 74–79 overall record and one NCAA tournament appearance in 2019. Rebels assistant coach Case was named interim head coach for the rest of the season. After the season ended, the school hired former Texas head coach Beard on March 13.
Oral Roberts	Paul Mills		Russell Springmann	Mills left Oral Roberts on March 21, 2023, after 6 seasons for the head coaching job at Wichita State, which became official the following day. The day after Mills left, the Golden Eagles promoted assistant Springmann to the head coaching position.
Penn State	Micah Shrewsberry		Mike Rhoades	Shrewsberry left Penn State on March 23, 2023, after 2 seasons for the Notre Dame head coaching job. The Nittany Lions then hired VCU head coach Mike Rhoades on March 29.
Providence	Ed Cooley		Kim English	Cooley left Providence on March 20, 2023, after 12 seasons for the head coaching job at Big East Conference rival Georgetown. 3 days later, the Friars hired George Mason head coach English for the job.
Quinnipiac	Baker Dunleavy		Tom Pecora	Dunleavy announced his resignation from Quinnipiac on April 13, 2023, after 6 seasons and an 86–93 record. Bobcats associate head coach Pecora was immediately promoted to the position.
Sam Houston	Jason Hooten		Chris Mudge	Hooten left Sam Houston on March 24, 2023, after 13 seasons for future conference rival New Mexico State. The Bearkats promoted longtime assistant Mudge to the position on April 3.
South Florida	Brian Gregory		Amir Abdur-Rahim	South Florida fired Gregory on March 10, 2023, after 6 seasons and a 79–107 record. The Bulls hired Kennesaw State's Amir Abdur-Rahim as their new head coach on March 29.
Southern	Sean Woods		Kevin Johnson	Southern parted ways with Woods on March 22, 2023, after 5 seasons and a 64–82 record. Tulane assistant Johnson was hired by the Jaguars on March 29.
Southern Utah	Todd Simon	Flynn Clayman	Rob Jeter	Simon left Southern Utah on March 15, 2023, after 7 seasons for Bowling Green. Later in that day, Thunderbirds associate head coach Clayman was named interim head coach for the team in the CBI. On April 9, the school hired Western Illinois head coach Jeter.
St. Francis Brooklyn	Glenn Braica	None		St. Francis College announced on March 20, 2023, that it was eliminating its entire athletic program at the end of the spring season.
St. John's	Mike Anderson		Rick Pitino	St. John's fired Anderson on March 10, 2023, after 4 seasons without a postseason tournament appearance and a 69–56 record. Iona head coach Rick Pitino was hired by the Red Storm on March 20, marking his return to coaching in the Big East Conference after 10 years.
Syracuse	Jim Boeheim		Adrian Autry	Syracuse parted ways with Boeheim on March 8, 2023, after having been the head coach of the Orange since 1976. Boeheim won 1,015 games (not counting wins vacated by the NCAA), including the 2003 national championship along with four other Final Four appearances during his 47-year career with Syracuse. Associate head coach and former Syracuse player Autry was named as his successor.
Temple	Aaron Mckie		Adam Fisher	McKie stepped down as Temple head coach on March 13, 2023, and will take on a new role as a special advisor to the athletics department. Under McKie, who took over for Fran Dunphy in 2019, the Owls went 52–56 with no postseason appearances during his 4-year tenure. Penn State assistant coach Fisher was hired by the school on March 29.
Texas	Chris Beard	Rodney Terry		Beard, who was in his 2nd season with Texas, was dismissed on January 5, 2023, less than a month after he had been suspended without pay following his arrest on a domestic violence charge, which was eventually dropped. Top assistant Terry, who had been named interim head coach upon Beard's suspension, remained in that position through the rest of the season. After guiding the Longhorns to the Big 12 tournament championship and an appearance in the Elite 8 of the NCAA tournament, the school removed the interim tag from Terry and named him the full time head coach on March 27.
Texas A&M–Corpus Christi	Steve Lutz		Jim Shaw	Lutz left Corpus Christi on March 18, 2023, after 2 seasons for the Western Kentucky head coaching job. On March 29, the Islanders promoted assistant coach Shaw to the position.
Texas Tech	Mark Adams		Grant McCasland	Adams resigned from Texas Tech after 2 seasons on March 8, 2023, days after he was suspended for using what the school called an "inappropriate, unacceptable, and racially insensitive comment." On March 31, the Red Raiders hired North Texas head coach McCasland as his replacement.
Utah State	Ryan Odom		Danny Sprinkle	Odom left Utah State on March 29, 2023, after 2 seasons for the VCU head coaching position. Montana State head coach Sprinkle was hired by the Aggies on April 7.
Utah Valley	Mark Madsen		Todd Phillips	Madsen would leave Utah Valley after 4 seasons to accept the head coaching position at California on March 29, 2023. The Wolverines promoted associate head coach Phillips to the position on April 6.
UT Arlington	Greg Young	Royce Johnson	K. T. Turner	UT Arlington fired Young, who was in his 2nd season as head coach, on February 10, 2023, after a 20–34 overall record. Mavericks associate head coach Johnson was named interim head coach for the rest of the season. On March 17, the school hired Kentucky assistant Turner for the job.
Valparaiso	Matt Lottich		Roger Powell Jr.	Valpo parted ways with Lottich on March 23, 2023, after 7 seasons and a 108–117 record. Gonzaga assistant Powell, an assistant with the Beacons (then called the Crusaders) from 2011 to 2016, was hired on April 7.
VCU	Mike Rhoades		Ryan Odom	Rhoades left VCU on March 29, 2023, after 6 seasons to accept the Penn State job. The Rams would waste no time in searching for their new coach, hiring Utah State's Odom that same day.
Western Illinois	Rob Jeter		Chad Boudreau	Jeter left Western Illinois on April 10, 2023, after 3 seasons for the Southern Utah job. Leathernecks associate head coach Boudreau, initially named interim head coach after Jeter's departure, was officially promoted to the position on April 13.
Western Kentucky	Rick Stansbury		Steve Lutz	Stansbury resigned from WKU on March 11, 2023, after 7 seasons and a 139–89 record. Texas A&M–Corpus Christi head coach Lutz was hired by the Hilltoppers on March 18.
Wichita State	Isaac Brown		Paul Mills	Wichita State fired Brown on March 11, 2023, after compiling a 48–34 record in 3 seasons with one tournament appearance. Oral Roberts head coach Mills was hired by the Shockers on March 21.
Wofford	Jay McAuley	Dwight Perry		McAuley resigned from Wofford on December 30, 2022, having been on a leave of absence since December 5. In his 3½ seasons as head coach, he had an overall record of 58–41; but under his watch, the Terriers never made it to a postseason tournament. Top assistant Dwight Perry was named interim head coach as he has served in such position since December 5. On March 21, the school removed the interim tag from Perry.

== Attendances ==
The top 30 NCAA Division I men's basketball teams by average home attendance:

#	Team	Home games	Total attendance	Average attendance
1	North Carolina	15	298,344	19,890
2	Kentucky	18	357,721	19,873
3	Syracuse	18	343,828	19,102
4	Arkansas	17	323,875	19,051
5	Tennessee	16	300,496	18,781
6	Creighton	15	257,449	17,163
7	Kansas	16	260,800	16,300
8	Indiana	17	273,721	16,101
9	Illinois	17	256,539	15,091
10	Purdue	16	238,016	14,876
11	Michigan State	14	207,158	14,797
12	Marquette	17	243,584	14,328
13	Virginia	16	227,511	14,219
14	Wisconsin	17	240,563	14,151
15	BYU	16	225,875	14,117
16	Arizona	17	239,947	14,115
17	Maryland	17	238,777	14,046
18	Dayton	16	214,512	13,407
19	Iowa State	16	213,998	13,375
20	NC State	17	225,307	13,253
21	Texas Tech	17	224,774	13,222
22	Nebraska	15	198,322	13,221
23	Louisville	17	212,441	12,497
24	Iowa	17	210,305	12,371
25	San Diego State	16	196,181	12,261
26	Ohio State	16	194,901	12,181
27	West Virginia	17	204,064	12,004
28	Michigan	17	199,725	11,749
29	Missouri	19	219,844	11,571
30	New Mexico	20	228,225	11,411

== See also ==
- 2022–23 NCAA Division I women's basketball season
