= 2022–23 UT Arlington Mavericks men's basketball team =

American college basketball season

2022–23 UT Arlington Mavericks men's basketball
- Conference: Western Athletic Conference
- Record: 11–21 (6–12 WAC)
- Head coach: Greg Young (2nd season); Royce Johnson (interim)
- Assistant coaches: Dwight Thorne II; Cinco Boone
- Home arena: College Park Center

2022–23 WAC men's basketball standings
	Conf.				Overall
Team	W		L	PCT	W		L	PCT
Utah Valley	15	–	3	.833	28	–	9	.757
Sam Houston	14	–	4	.778	26	–	8	.765
Southern Utah	12	–	6	.667	24	–	13	.649
Grand Canyon †	11	–	7	.611	24	–	12	.667
Seattle	11	–	7	.611	20	–	12	.625
Stephen F. Austin	11	–	7	.611	19	–	13	.594
Tarleton State *	9	–	9	.500	17	–	17	.500
California Baptist	8	–	10	.444	17	–	16	.515
Abilene Christian	7	–	11	.389	13	–	17	.433
UT Rio Grande Valley	6	–	12	.333	15	–	17	.469
UT Arlington	6	–	12	.333	11	–	21	.344
Utah Tech *	5	–	13	.278	14	–	19	.424
New Mexico State **	2	–	16	.111	9	–	15	.375
† Conference tournament winner * Ineligible for the NCAA tournament due to transition from NCAA Division II ** Remaining games as of February 11, 2023 cancelled.

The 2022–23 UT Arlington Mavericks men's basketball team represented the University of Texas at Arlington in the 2022–23 NCAA Division I men's basketball season. The Mavericks, led by second-year head coach Greg Young, played their home games at the College Park Center in Arlington, Texas as members of the Western Athletic Conference.

== Previous season ==
The Mavericks finished the 2021–22 season 11–18, 7–10 in Sun Belt play, to finish in ninth place. In the Sun Belt tournament, they lost in the first round to Louisiana. This was their last season as members of the Sun Belt Conference, as they returned to the Western Athletic Conference (WAC) for the first time since the 2012–13 season, their only prior season as a WAC member.

== Roster ==
2022–23 UT Arlington Mavericks men's basketball team
Players
Coaches

Pos.	#	Name	Height	Weight	Year	Hometown
G	00	Aaron Cash	6 ft 6 in (1.98 m)	210 lb (95 kg)	RS Sr	San Francisco, CA
G	1	Chendall Weaver	6 ft 3 in (1.91 m)	164 lb (74 kg)	Fr	Mansfield, TX
F	2	Brandon Walker	6 ft 7 in (2.01 m)	260 lb (118 kg)	Fr	Oak Cliff, TX
G	3	Taj Anderson	6 ft 4 in (1.93 m)	171 lb (78 kg)	Jr	Queens, NY
G	4	Kyron Gibson	6 ft 1 in (1.85 m)	198 lb (90 kg)	Jr	Alexandria, LA
G	5	Brandyn Talbot	6 ft 5 in (1.96 m)	181 lb (82 kg)	So	Toronto, ON
G	10	Shaysten Cornish	6 ft 0 in (1.83 m)	196 lb (89 kg)	RS So	Arlington, TX
F	12	Damonze Woods	6 ft 7 in (2.01 m)	205 lb (93 kg)	Fr	Amarillo, TX
G	14	Cash Clayton	6 ft 2 in (1.88 m)	173 lb (78 kg)	RS Fr	Austin, TX
G	21	Pedro Castro	6 ft 6 in (1.98 m)	196 lb (89 kg)	GS	Fort Worth, TX
F	22	Shemar Wilson	6 ft 9 in (2.06 m)	215 lb (98 kg)	So	Avondale, AZ
F	23	Dario Domingos	6 ft 8 in (2.03 m)	261 lb (118 kg)	So	Luanda, Angola
F	24	Montez Young Jr.	6 ft 5 in (1.96 m)	192 lb (87 kg)	So	Waxahachie, TX
G	55	Marion Humphrey	6 ft 3 in (1.91 m)	192 lb (87 kg)	RS Jr	Hoover, AL

Head coach

- Greg Young (Howard Payne)

Assistant coach(es)

- Royce Johnson (Thomas Edison State)
- Dwight Thorne II (Colorado)
- Cinco Boone (Eastern New Mexico)

Legend

- (C) Team captain
- (S) Suspended
- (I) Ineligible
- (W) Walk-on
- Injured
- Current redshirt

Roster
Last update: January 10, 2023

== Schedule and results ==
Date time, TV	Rank^{#}	Opponent^{#}	Result	Record	High points	High rebounds	High assists	Site (attendance) city, state
Non-conference regular season
November 7, 2022*; 8:00 pm, Big 12 Now		at Oklahoma State	L 66–77	0–1	14 – Anderson	5 – 3 tied	3 – Gibson	Gallagher-Iba Arena (5,324); Stillwater, OK
November 12, 2022*; 7:30 pm, ESPN+		Southwestern	W 103–61	1–1	20 – Weaver	9 – Wilson	4 – 2 tied	College Park Center (2,466); Arlington, TX
November 15, 2022*; 7:00 pm, ESPN+		Hardin–Simmons	W 100–59	2–1	17 – 2 tied	16 – Wilson	4 – Cash	College Park Center (1,429); Arlington, TX
November 18, 2022*; 7:00 pm, ESPN+		Nevada	L 43–62	2–2	7 – Humphrey	14 – Wilson	1 – 4 tied	College Park Center (1,475); Arlington, TX
November 21, 2022*; 4:00 pm		vs. Drexel; Gulf Coast Showcase first round	L 38–59	2–3	11 – Gibson	8 – Walker	3 – Gibson	Hertz Arena (654); Estero, FL
November 22, 2022*; 12:30 pm		vs. Northern Kentucky; Gulf Coast Showcase consolation second round	W 60–56	3–3	15 – Talbot	10 – Domingos	3 – 2 tied	Hertz Arena (243); Estero, FL
November 23, 2022*; 12:30 pm		vs. East Carolina; Gulf Coast Showcase 5th-place game	L 65–79	3–4	13 – Gibson	4 – 3 tied	4 – Humphrey	Hertz Arena (198); Estero, FL
November 28, 2022*; 7:00 pm, ESPN+		Howard Payne	W 99–41	4–4	17 – Weaver	14 – Wilson	11 – Humphrey	College Park Center (1,011); Arlington, TX
December 2, 2022*; 7:00 pm, ESPN+		at LSU	L 59–63	4–5	15 – Humphrey	7 – Domingos	4 – Humphrey	Pete Maravich Assembly Center (9,145); Baton Rouge, LA
December 6, 2022*; 7:00 pm, ESPN+		North Texas	L 57–60	4–6	16 – Wilson	8 – Wilson	2 – 4 tied	College Park Center (1,931); Arlington, TX
December 10, 2022*; 6:30 pm		vs. Texas State; Simmons Bank Showdown	L 65–71	4–7	19 – Gibson	8 – 2 tied	4 – Gibson	Dickies Arena; Fort Worth, TX
December 19, 2022*; 9:00 pm, WCC Network		at San Francisco	W 68–63	5–7	12 – 2 tied	10 – Weaver	4 – Gibson	War Memorial Gymnasium; San Francisco, CA
December 21, 2022*; 6:00 pm, P12N		at California	L 51–73	5–8	14 – Wilson	11 – Wilson	6 – Humphrey	Haas Pavilion (1,130); Berkeley, CA
WAC regular season
December 29, 2022; 7:00 pm, ESPN+		at Tarleton	L 63–70	5–9 (0–1)	15 – Gibson	8 – Cash	4 – Humphrey	Wisdom Gym (1,533); Stephenville, TX
December 31, 2022; 1:00 pm, ESPN+		Stephen F. Austin	L 62–66	5–10 (0–2)	16 – Wilson	13 – Wilson	5 – Gibson	College Park Center (1,419); Arlington, TX
January 5, 2023; 7:00 pm, ESPN+		Utah Valley	L 64–72	5–11 (0–3)	13 – 2 tied	14 – Wilson	2 – 3 tied	College Park Center (1,017); Arlington, TX
January 7, 2023; 2:00 pm, ESPN+		Seattle	L 61–76	5–12 (0–4)	18 – Wilson	8 – Wilson	7 – Gibson	College Park Center (1,052); Arlington, TX
January 12, 2023; 8:00 pm, ESPN+		at Grand Canyon	L 48–80	5–13 (0–5)	11 – Gibson	8 – Wilson	4 – Gibson	GCU Arena (6,982); Phoenix, AZ
January 14, 2023; 8:00 pm, ESPN+		at New Mexico State	W 66–55	6–13 (1–5)	16 – Weaver	9 – Wilson	6 – Gibson	Pan American Center (4,864); Las Cruces, NM
January 19, 2023; 7:00 pm, ESPN+		Texas–Rio Grande Valley	W 85–73	7–13 (2–5)	20 – Cash	9 – Young Jr.	12 – Gibson	College Park Center (1,663); Arlington, TX
January 21, 2023; 6:00 pm, ESPN+		at Abilene Christian	L 68–84	7–14 (2–6)	20 – Gibson	7 – Weaver	3 – Gibson	Moody Coliseum (2,005); Abilene, TX
January 25, 2023; 7:00 pm, ESPN+		California Baptist	L 66–74	7–15 (2–7)	22 – Gibson	6 – Cash	3 – Weaver	College Park Center (1,271); Arlington, TX
February 4, 2023; 4:00 pm, ESPN+		Sam Houston	W 70–58	8–15 (3–7)	21 – Weaver	6 – 2 tied	8 – Gibson	College Park Center (1,691); Arlington, TX
February 6, 2023; 4:00 pm, ESPN+		Tarleton	L 64–69	8–16 (3–8)	19 – Weaver	9 – Young Jr.	6 – Gibson	College Park Center (423); Arlington, TX
February 9, 2023; 6:30 pm, ESPN+		at Texas–Rio Grande Valley	W 64–58	9–16 (4–8)	13 – 2 tied	7 – Gibson	8 – Gibson	UTRGV Fieldhouse (1,837); Edinburg, TX
February 15, 2023; 6:30 pm, ESPN+		at Sam Houston	L 56–66	9–17 (4–9)	15 – Walker	9 – Walker	3 – Gibson	Bernard Johnson Coliseum (1,332); Huntsville, TX
February 18, 2023; 2:00 pm, ESPN+		at Stephen F. Austin	W 75–70	10–17 (5–9)	17 – Weaver	8 – tied	5 – Weaver	William R. Johnson Coliseum (3,466); Nacogdoches, TX
February 23, 2023; 7:00 pm, ESPN+		Southern Utah	L 76–86	10–18 (5–10)	17 – tied	7 – Walker	5 – Humphrey	College Park Center (1,526); Arlington, TX
February 25, 2023; 2:00 pm, ESPN+		Utah Tech	W 71–69 ^{OT}	11–18 (6–10)	17 – Cash	10 – Castro	8 – Talbot	College Park Center (1,905); Arlington, TX
March 1, 2023; 7:00 pm, ESPN+		at Utah Valley	L 59–78	12–18 (6–11)	16 – Gibson	5 – Castro	3 – Weaver	UCCU Center (2,574); Orem, UT
March 3, 2023; 9:00 pm, ESPN+		at Seattle	L 56–80	11–20 (6–12)	10 – tied	6 – tied	4 – Gibson	Redhawk Center (1,175); Seattle, WA
WAC tournament
March 7, 2023; 2:00 pm, ESPN+	(12)	vs. (5) Grand Canyon; First round	L 77–82	11–21	17 – Gibson	8 – Weaver	4 – tied	Michelob Ultra Arena (785); Paradise, NV
*Non-conference game. ^{#}Rankings from AP poll. (#) Tournament seedings in parentheses. All times are in Central.
