= Royce Johnson (basketball) =

American basketball player and coach

Biographical details
- Education: North Texas

Playing career
- 1992–1993: North Texas

Coaching career (HC unless noted)
- 1995–1997: Kimbal HS (assistant)
- 1998–2014: Kimbal HS
- 2018–2020: UT Arlington (assistant)
- 2021–2023: UT Arlington (associate head coach)
- 2023: UT Arlington (interim HC)

Head coaching record
- Overall: 2–5 (.286) (college); 373–76 (.831) (high school)

Royce "Snoop" Johnson is an American basketball coach who was most recently the interim head coach of the UT Arlington Mavericks men's basketball team.

== Playing career ==
Johnson played one year at North Texas in the 1992–1993 season. He played in 11 games averaging 0.6 points, 0.7 rebounds, and 1.3 assists.

== Coaching career ==
in 1995 Johnson became an assistant coach at Kimbal High School under his dad. In 1998 he was made the head coach of Kimbal High School. He was the head coach for 16 years and compiled a record of 373-76 he also led the team to 3 state championships. On June 8, 2014, Johnson was fired. In 2018 Johnson was hired as an assistant coach. In 2021 he was promoted to associate head coach. On February 11, 2023, after Greg Young was fired Johnson was named the interim head coach.

Record table
Season	Team	Overall	Conference	Standing	Postseason
UT Arlington Mavericks (Western Athletic Conference) (2023)
2022–23	UT Arlington	2–5	2–4	T–11th	
UT Arlington:		2–5 (.286)	2–4 (.333)		
Total:		2–5 (.286)			
National champion Postseason invitational champion Conference regular season champion Conference regular season and conference tournament champion Division regular season champion Division regular season and conference tournament champion Conference tournament champion
