= Greg Young (basketball) =

American basketball player and coach

Current position
- Title: Special assistant to the head coach
- Team: Maryland
- Conference: Big Ten Conference

Biographical details
- Born: Cleburne, Texas

Playing career
- 1983–1986: Howard Payne

Coaching career (HC unless noted)
- 1986–1990: Texas Wesleyan (assistant)
- 1990–1991: Cleburne HS (TX) (assistant)
- 1991–1994: Eastern New Mexico (assistant)
- 1994–1998: Lamar CC
- 1998–2000: Hill College
- 2000–2005: Texas State (assistant)
- 2005–2009: Jacksonville College
- 2009–2021: UT Arlington (assistant)
- 2021–2023: UT Arlington
- 2023–2025: Troy (associate)
- 2025–present: Maryland (SATHC)

Head coaching record
- Overall: 180–156 (.536)

Greg Young is an American basketball coach who is currently the special assistant to the head coach for the Maryland Terrapins. He was most recently the head coach of the UT Arlington Mavericks men's basketball team and the associate head coach for the Troy Trojans.

== Playing career ==
A three-sport athlete in high school, Young played college basketball at Howard Payne University where he was a four-year letterman and senior captain.

== Coaching career ==
After graduating from college in 1986, Young would spend the next four years as an assistant coach at Texas Wesleyan before returning to his hometown as an assistant at Cleburne High School for a single season. He returned to the college ranks as an assistant at Eastern New Mexico before landing his first head coaching job at Lamar Community College in Colorado. After four seasons with the Runnin' Lopes, Young took the head coaching position at Hill College where he stayed for two seasons before becoming an assistant coach and recruiting coordinator at Texas State for Dennis Nutt. Young would return to the junior college ranks to take the head coaching position at Jacksonville College where he'd lead the team to one of its best records in school history with a 21–10 record during the 2008–09 season, and would be honored as Region XIV Coach of the Year. Overall, Young would compile a 168–139 record across his head coaching stops at the junior and community college level.

In 2009, Scott Cross would hire Young as an assistant coach at UT Arlington. As an assistant, Young was part of the Mavericks' 2012 NIT squad as well as the 2016 Sun Belt regular season title winners and 2017 NIT quarterfinalist team. After Scott's firing, Young was retained by Chris Ogden.

After Ogden departed for an assistant coaching position at Texas, UT Arlington elevated Young to the head coaching position on April 5, 2021, making him the 9th head coach in program history.

Less than two years into his tenure as the head basketball coach, Young was fired after starting 9-16 into the 2022-23 season and compiling a 20-34 record with the program.

He was hired as the associate head coach for the Troy Trojans on August 18, 2023.

Young was hired as the special assistant to the head coach for the Maryland Terrapins on July 9, 2025.

== Head coaching record ==
=== NCAA D1 ===
Record table
Season	Team	Overall	Conference	Standing	Postseason
UT Arlington Mavericks (Sun Belt Conference) (2021–2022)
2021–22	UT Arlington	11–18	7–10	9th	
UT Arlington Mavericks (Western Athletic Conference) (2022–2023)
2022–23	UT Arlington	9–16	4–8		
UT Arlington:		20–34 (.370)	11–18 (.379)		
Total:		20–34 (.370)			
National champion Postseason invitational champion Conference regular season champion Conference regular season and conference tournament champion Division regular season champion Division regular season and conference tournament champion Conference tournament champion
