= Chris Ogden =

American college basketball coach (born 1980)

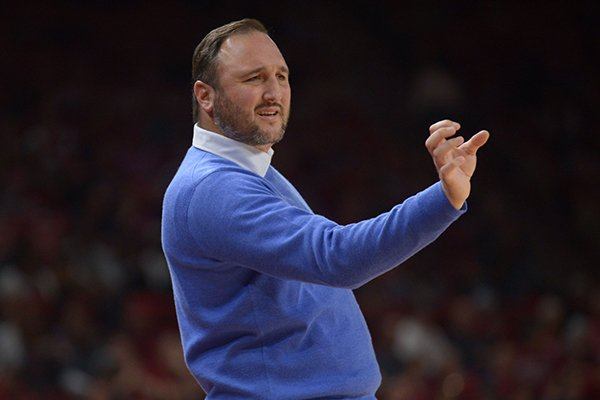

Current position
- Title: General Manager
- Team: Texas
- Conference: Big 12

Biographical details
- Born: October 16, 1980 (age 46); Seminole, Texas, U.S.

Playing career
- 1999–2003: Texas

Coaching career (HC unless noted)
- 2008–2015: Texas (assistant)
- 2015–2016: Tennessee (assistant)
- 2016–2018: Texas Tech (assistant)
- 2018–2021: UT Arlington
- 2021–present: Texas (General Manager / Assistant Coach)

Head coaching record
- Overall: 44–47 (.484)

Accomplishments and honors

Awards
- Sun Belt Coach of the Year (2019); Texas Mr. Basketball (1999)

Christopher Kyle Ogden (born October 16, 1980) is an American college basketball coach who is the currently the General Manager at Texas. He was previously the head coach at UT Arlington.

== Playing career ==
Ogden was the 1999 Texas Mr. Basketball Winner, as the best player in the state. Ogden's son, Bo Ogden, won the 2026 Texas Mr. Basketball.

Ogden was a four-year player at Texas from 1999 to 2003, playing for Rick Barnes where he was a member of four NCAA tournament teams, and graduated as the school's all-time winningest player, as he was a part of 97 wins.

== Coaching career ==
While completing his undergraduate studies, Ogden assumed a student assistant role, and move into various administrative roles for Texas until 2008, when he was elevated to assistant coach. He remained on staff with Barnes through 2015, and followed Barnes to Tennessee as an assistant coach for the 2015–2016 season. Ogden returned to his home state as an assistant coach under Chris Beard at Texas Tech for two seasons.

On April 6, 2018, Ogden was named the eighth head coach in UT Arlington basketball history, replacing Scott Cross.

Ogden returned to his alma mater in 2021 as an assistant under Beard, who took the Texas job on April 1. Ogden continued to work on the staff as General Manager under Rodney Terry and current head coach Sean Miller.

== Head coaching record ==
Record table
Season	Team	Overall	Conference	Standing	Postseason
UT Arlington Mavericks (Sun Belt Conference) (2018–2021)
2018–19	UT Arlington	17–16	12–6	T–2nd	
2019–20	UT Arlington	14–18	10–10	7th	
2020–21	UT Arlington	13–13	9–8	3rd (West)	
UT Arlington:		44–47 (.484)	31–24 (.564)		
Total:		44–47 (.484)			
