= UT Arlington Mavericks men's basketball =

Collegiate basketball team

UT Arlington Mavericks
2025–26 UT Arlington Mavericks men's basketball team
- University: University of Texas at Arlington
- Head coach: K. T. Turner (3rd season)
- Location: Arlington, Texas
- Arena: College Park Center (capacity: 7,000)
- Conference: UAC
- Nickname: Mavericks
- Colors: Royal blue, white, and orange

NCAA Division I tournament appearances
- 2008

Conference tournament champions
- 2008

Conference regular-season champions
- 2004, 2012, 2017

Uniforms
Home	Away

The UT Arlington Mavericks men's basketball team is an NCAA Division I college basketball team competing in the United Athletic Conference. Home games are played at College Park Center, located on the University of Texas at Arlington's campus in Arlington. The team appeared in the 2008 NCAA tournament, losing against the #1 seed Memphis in the first round, although Memphis was later forced to vacate the win due to infractions committed by the program.

== History ==
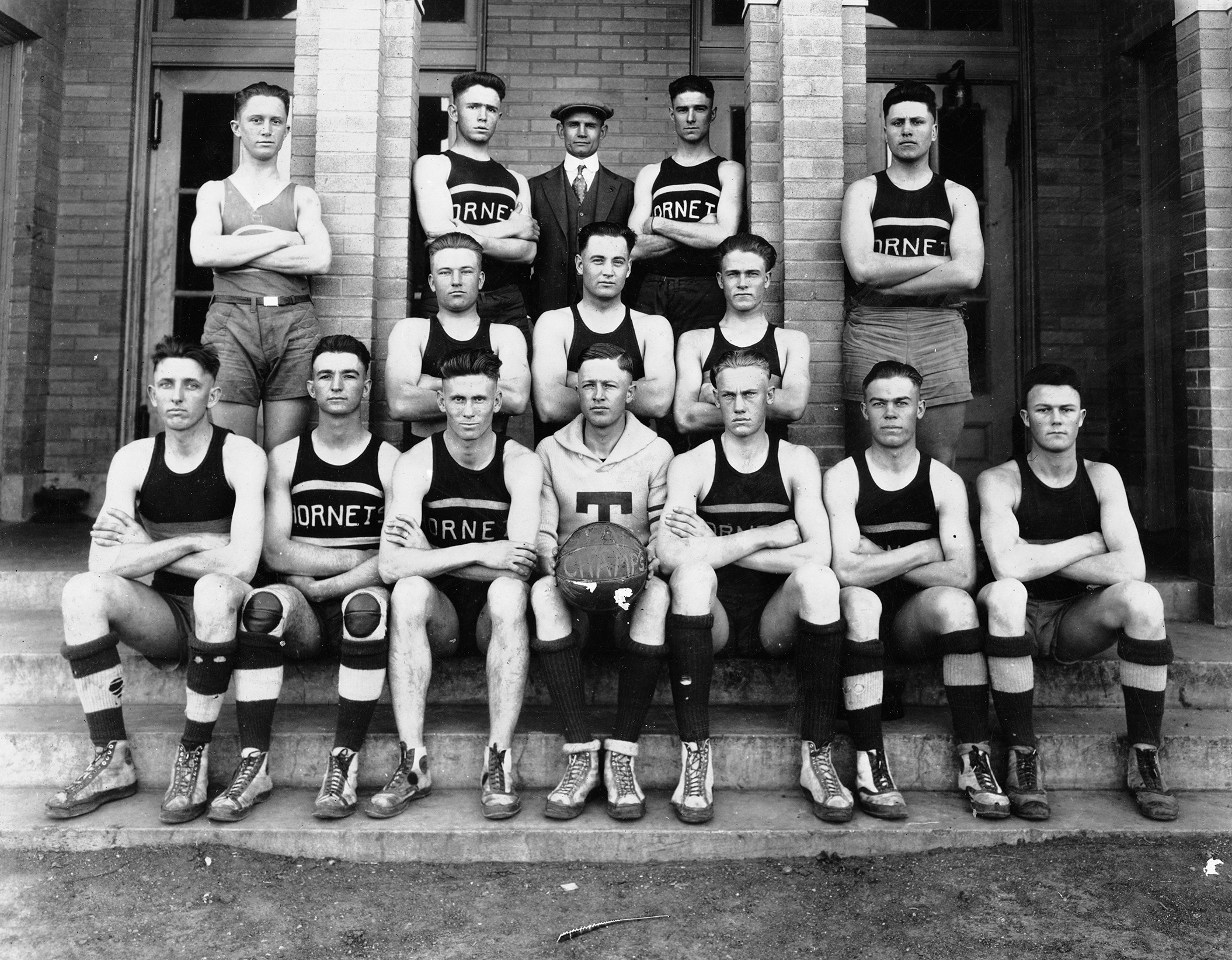
Grubbs Vocational College men's basketball team, 1922

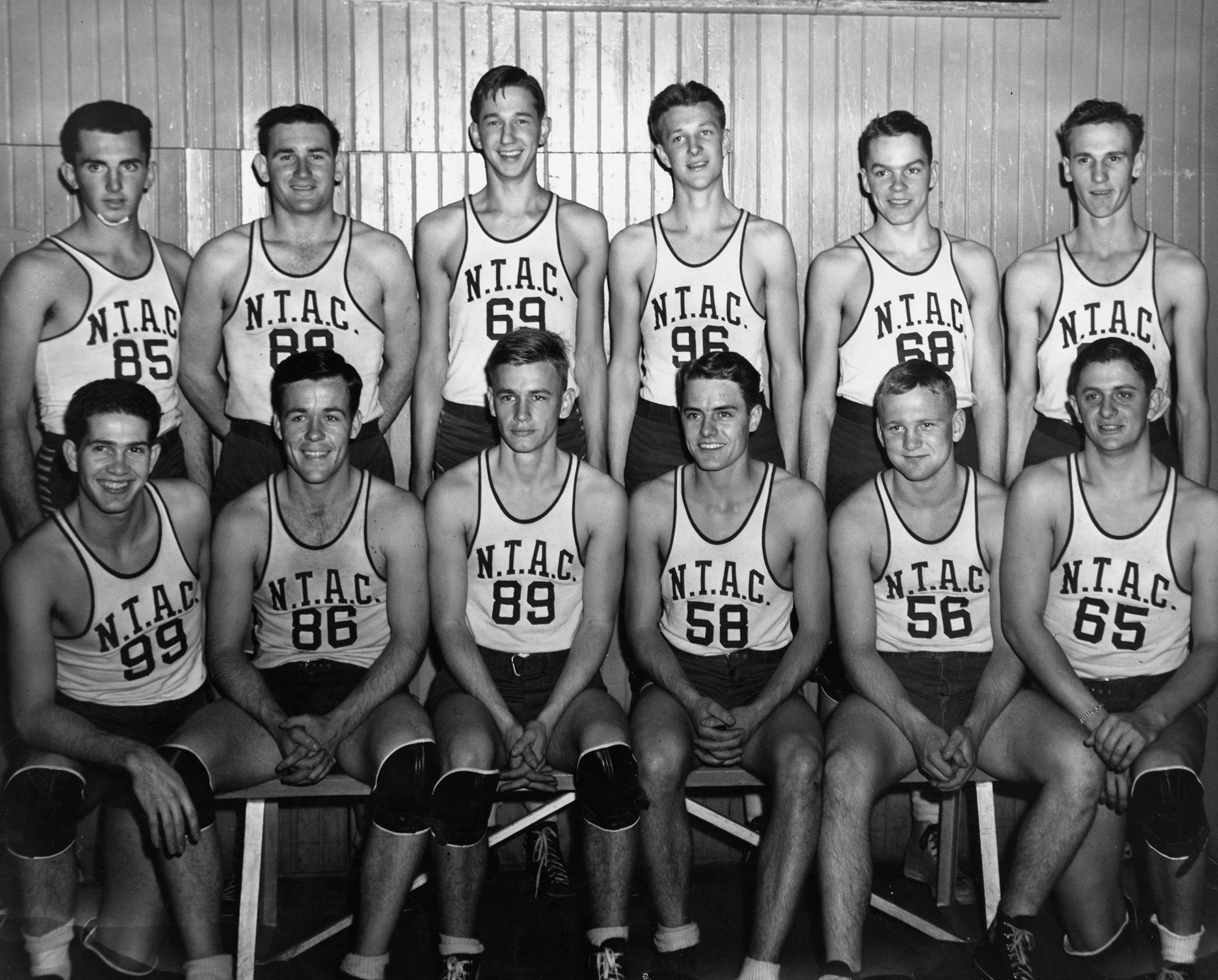
North Texas Agricultural College men's basketball team, 1944

The Mavericks are one of the founding teams of the Southland Conference, which began with five institutions on March 15, 1963. Although only 22 of 65 seasons have resulted in an overall winning record, 13 of the past 22 seasons have a .500 winning percentage or better, including a school record 27 wins in the 2016–2017 season (as of the conclusion of the 2020–21 season). The team won an outright Southland Conference regular season championship in 2011/2012, along with a tie for the 2004 regular season champion and a 2008 conference tournament championship that led to their first NCAA Tournament appearance. The Mavericks played in the Western Athletic Conference in 2012–13 before joining the Sun Belt Conference in 2013–14. The program earned its first Sun Belt regular season title in the record-setting 2016–17 season. The Mavericks rejoined the WAC for the 2022-23 athletic season.

== Facilities ==
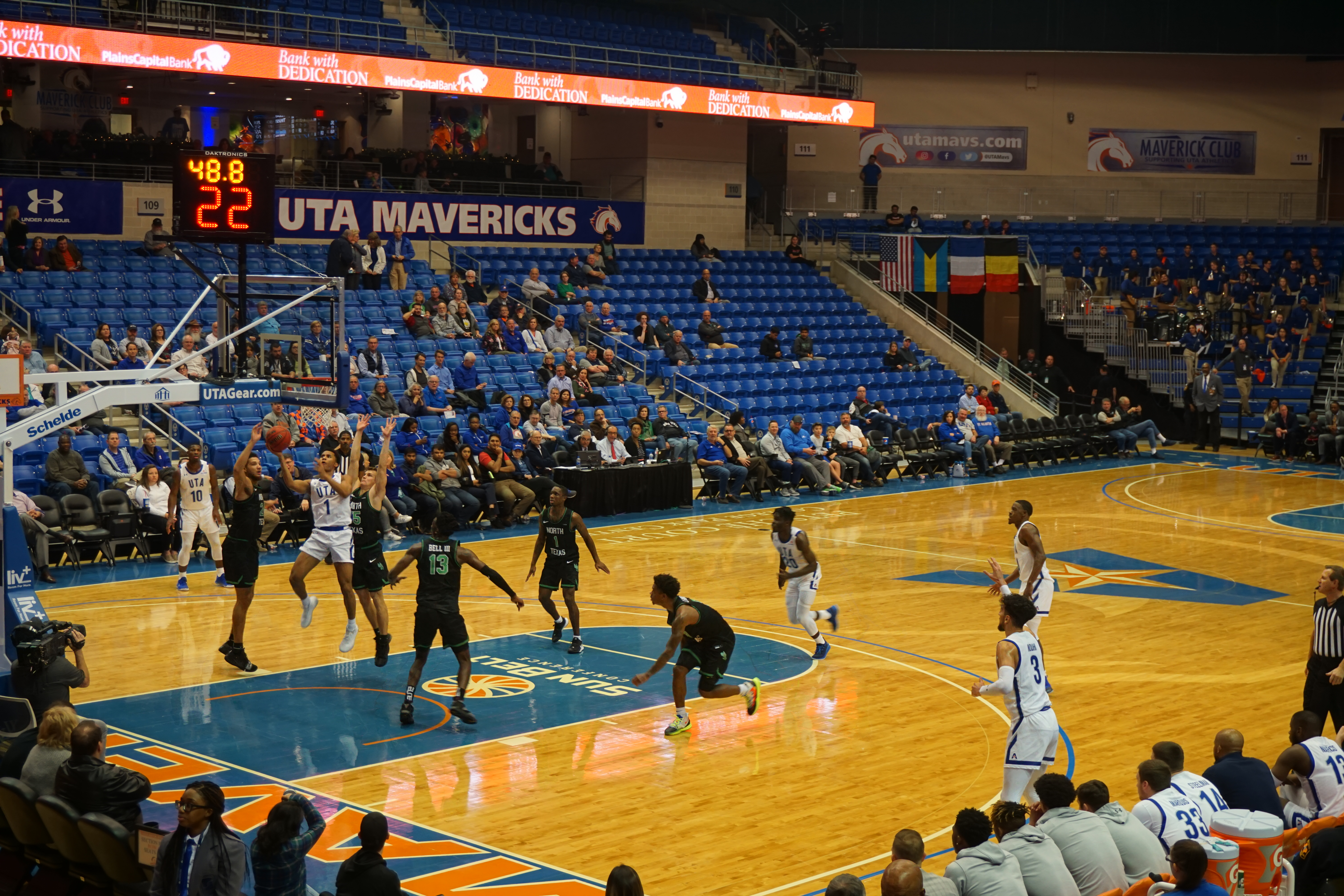
UTA in action against North Texas at College Park Center

Until February 2012, the Mavericks played at Texas Hall, which is a 3,300-seat theater on the campus. The teams played on the stage, and fans could watch the game from either the theater seats or the bleacher section.

A new arena called the College Park Center with a seating capacity of 7,000 hosted the final four regular season home games for the team in 2012. The facility is located on the eastern side of the campus along with new housing, parking, and retail developments.

== Coaches ==
The Mavericks have had 11 coaches, listed below, in their 62-year history.

- Tom Tinker – 1959–1966 (7 seasons)
- Barry Dowd – 1966–1976 (10 seasons)
- Bob "Snake" LeGrand – 1976–1987 (11 seasons)
- Jerry Stone – 1987–1988 (1 season)
- Mark Nixon – 1988–1992 (4 seasons)
- Eddie McCarter – 1992–2006 (14 seasons)
- Scott Cross – 2006–2018 (12 seasons)
- Chris Ogden – 2018–2021 (3 seasons)
- Greg Young - 2021–2023 (2 seasons)
- Royce "Snoop" Johnson - 2023 (Interim Head coach)
- K. T. Turner – 2023–present (2 seasons)

== Postseason results ==
=== NCAA tournament results ===
The Mavericks have appeared in the NCAA tournament once. Their record is 0–1.

Year	Round	Opponent	Result
2008	First Round	Memphis	L 63–87^

^Memphis win vacated for NCAA infractions

=== NIT results ===
The Mavericks have appeared in the National Invitation Tournament (NIT) three times. Their combined record is 2–3.

Year	Round	Opponent	Result
1981	First Round	South Alabama	L 81–84
2012	First Round	Washington	L 72–82
2017	First Round; Second Round; Quarterfinals	BYU; Akron; Cal State Bakersfield	W 105–89; W 85–69; L 76–80

=== CIT results ===
The Mavericks have appeared in the CollegeInsider.com Postseason Tournament (CIT) two times. Their combined record is 1–2.

Year	Round	Opponent	Result
2013	First Round	Oral Roberts	L 76–84
2016	First Round; Quarterfinals	Savannah State; NJIT	W 75–59; L 60–63

== Season-by-season results ==
Record table
Season	Coach	Overall	Conference	Standing	Postseason
Tom Tinker (Independent) (1959–1963)
1959–1960	Tinker	6–18			
1960–1961	Tinker	11–12			
1961–1962	Tinker	6–18			
1962–1963	Tinker	8–17			
Tom Tinker (Southland Conference) (1963–1966)
1963–1964	Tinker	4–21	1–7	T-4th	
1964–1965	Tinker	10–14	3–5	4th	
1965–1966	Tinker	9–13	1–7	5th	
Tom Tinker:		54–113 (.323)	5–19 (.208)		
Barry Dowd (Southland Conference) (1966–1976)
1966–1967	Dowd	14–12	4–4	T-2nd	
1967–1968	Dowd	6–20	2–6	5th	
1968–1969	Dowd	8–18	3–5	4th	
1969–1970	Dowd	8–16	4–4	T-2nd	
1970–1971	Dowd	8–18	3–5	4th	
1971–1972	Dowd	14–12	5–3	T-3rd	
1972–1973	Dowd	13–13	8–4	3rd	
1973–1974	Dowd	7–18	2–2	2nd	
1974–1975	Dowd	6–20	2–6	5th	
1975–1976	Dowd	6–21	1–9	6th	
Barry Dowd:		80–168 (.323)	34–48 (.415)		
Bob "Snake" LeGrand (Southland Conference) (1976–1987)
1976–1977	LeGrand	3–24	1–9	6th	
1977–1978	LeGrand	10–17	3–7	4th	
1978–1979	LeGrand	11–16	1–9	6th	
1979–1980	LeGrand	14–13	3–7	6th	
1980–1981	LeGrand	20–8	7–3	T-2nd	NIT first round
1981–1982	LeGrand	16–12	6–4	3rd	
1982–1983	LeGrand	9–19	3–9	7th	
1983–1984	LeGrand	5–23	1–11	7th	
1984–1985	LeGrand	12–16	3–9	6th	
1985–1986	LeGrand	12–18	2–10	7th	
1986–1987	LeGrand	10–18			
Bob "Snake" LeGrand:		122–184 (.399)	30–78 (.278)		
Jerry Stone (Southland Conference) (1987–1988)
1987–1988	Stone	7–22	4–10	T-6th	
Jerry Stone:		7–22 (.241)	4–10 (.286)		
Mark Nixon (Southland Conference) (1988–1992)
1988–1989	Nixon	7–21	4–10	7th	
1989–1990	Nixon	13–16	6–8	5th	
1990–1991	Nixon	20–9	11–3	T-2nd	
1991–1992	Nixon	16–13	11–7	5th	
Mark Nixon:		56–59 (.487)	32–28 (.533)		
Eddie McCarter (Southland Conference) (1992–2006)
1992–1993	McCarter	16–12	10–8	T-3rd	
1993–1994	McCarter	7–22	4–14	10th	
1994–1995	McCarter	10–17	7–11	T-7th	
1995–1996	McCarter	11–15	7–11	T-7th	
1996–1997	McCarter	12–15	8–8	T-4th	
1997–1998	McCarter	13–16	8–8	T-5th	
1998–1999	McCarter	10–16	8–10	T-7th	
1999–2000	McCarter	15–12	11–7	T-4th	
2000–2001	McCarter	13–15	11–9	T-4th	
2001–2002	McCarter	12–15	9–11	T-7th	
2002–2003	McCarter	16–13	13–7	3rd	
2003–2004	McCarter	17–12	11–5	T-1st	
2004–2005	McCarter	13–15	7–9	8th	
2005–2006	McCarter	14–16	7–9	7th	
Eddie McCarter:		179–211 (.459)	111–127 (.466)		
Scott Cross (Southland Conference) (2006–2012)
2006–2007	Cross	13–17	8–8	T-5th	
2007–2008	Cross	21–12	7–9	7th	NCAA first round
2008–2009	Cross	16–14	9–7	5th	
2009–2010	Cross	16–14	8–8	7th	
2010–2011	Cross	13–16	7–9	9th	
2011–2012	Cross	24–9	15–1	1st (West)	NIT first round
Scott Cross (Western Athletic Conference) (2012–2013)
2012–2013	Cross	19–14	11–7	T-4th	CIT first round
Scott Cross (Sun Belt Conference) (2013–2018)
2013–2014	Cross	15–17	9–9	6th	
2014–2015	Cross	16–15	10–10	5th	
2015–2016	Cross	24–11	13–7	3rd	CIT Quarterfinals
2016–2017	Cross	27–9	14–4	1st	NIT Quarterfinals
2017–2018	Cross	21–13	10–8	4th	
Scott Cross:		225–161 (.583)	121–87 (.582)		
Chris Ogden (Sun Belt Conference) (2018–2021)
2018–2019	Ogden	17-16	12-6	2nd	
2019–2020	Odgen	14-18	10-10	7th	
2020–2021	Odgen	13-13	9-8	3rd (West)	
Chris Ogden:		44–47 (.484)	31-24 (.564)		
Greg Young (Sun Belt Conference) (2021–2022)
2021–2022	Young	11–18	7–10	9th	
Greg Young (Western Athletic Conference) (2022–2023)
2022–2023	Young	9-16	4-8		
Greg Young:		20-34 (.370)	11–18 (.379)		
Royce Johnson (Western Athletic Conference) (2023–2023)
2023	Johnson	2-5	2-4	10th	
Royce Johnson:		2–5 (.286)	2–4 (.333)		
K. T. Turner (Western Athletic Conference) (2023–2026)
2023–2024	Turner	20-14	13-7	3rd	
2024–2025	Turner	13-18	6-10	7th	
K. T. Turner:		33-32 (.588)	19-17 (.650)		
Total:		778–989 (.441)			
National champion Postseason invitational champion Conference regular season champion Conference regular season and conference tournament champion Division regular season champion Division regular season and conference tournament champion Conference tournament champion
