= 2022–23 Northwestern State Demons basketball team =

American college basketball season

2022–23 Northwestern State Demons men's basketball
- Conference: Southland Conference
- Record: 22–11 (13–5 Southland)
- Head coach: Corey Gipson (1st season)
- Associate head coach: Rodney Hamilton
- Assistant coaches: Tony Holliday; Tim Ward
- Home arena: Prather Coliseum

2022–23 Southland Conference men's basketball standings
	Conf.				Overall
Team	W		L	PCT	W		L	PCT
Texas A&M–Corpus Christi †	14	–	4	.778	24	–	11	.686
Northwestern State	13	–	5	.722	22	–	11	.667
Southeastern Louisiana	12	–	6	.667	18	–	14	.563
Nicholls	11	–	7	.611	16	–	15	.516
Texas A&M–Commerce*	9	–	9	.500	13	–	20	.394
Houston Christian	7	–	11	.389	10	–	22	.313
New Orleans	7	–	11	.389	12	–	20	.375
McNeese	6	–	12	.333	11	–	23	.324
Incarnate Word	6	–	12	.333	12	–	19	.387
Lamar	5	–	13	.278	9	–	22	.290
† 2023 Southland tournament winner * ineligible for the 2023 NCAA tournament due to transition period

The 2022–23 Northwestern State Demons basketball team represented Northwestern State University in the 2022–23 NCAA Division I men's basketball season. The Demons, led by first-year head coach Corey Gipson, played their home games at Prather Coliseum in Natchitoches, Louisiana as members of the Southland Conference.

== Preseason polls ==
=== Southland Conference Poll ===
The Southland Conference released its preseason poll on October 25, 2022. Receiving 92 votes overall, the Demons were picked to finish sixth in the conference.

Predicted finish	Team	Votes (1st place)
1	Texas A&M–Corpus Christi	149 (11)
2	Nicholls	137 (6)
3	New Orleans	129 (2)
4	Southeastern	105
5	McNeese	97
6	Northwestern State	92
7	Texas A&M–Commerce	56
8	Houston Christian	55 (1)
9	Lamar	44
10	Incarnate Word	36

=== Preseason all-conference ===
No Demons were selected as preseason all-conference members.

== Roster ==
2022–23 Northwestern State Demons men's basketball team
Players
Coaches

Pos.	#	Name	Height	Weight	Year	Hometown
G	0	DeMarcus Sharp	6 ft 3 in (1.91 m)	180 lb (82 kg)	Sr	Charleston, MO
F	1	Reggie Hill	6 ft 8 in (2.03 m)	197 lb (89 kg)	So	Melbourne, FL
G	2	Emareyon McDonald	6 ft 2 in (1.88 m)	165 lb (75 kg)	So	Coushatta, LA
G	3	Isaac Haney	6 ft 2 in (1.88 m)	190 lb (86 kg)	So	West Plains, MO
G	4	Ja'Monta Black	6 ft 4 in (1.93 m)	205 lb (93 kg)	Sr	Columbia, MO
G	10	Greedy Williams	6 ft 4 in (1.93 m)	196 lb (89 kg)	Fr	Montgomery, AL
G	11	Harrison Black	5 ft 8 in (1.73 m)	158 lb (72 kg)	So	Houston, TX
G	12	Jalen Hampton	6 ft 6 in (1.98 m)	200 lb (91 kg)	Fr	St. Louis, MO
G	15	Jovan Zelenbaba	6 ft 4 in (1.93 m)	200 lb (91 kg)	Jr	Kfar Blum, Israel
G/F	22	Cedric Garrett	6 ft 5 in (1.96 m)	205 lb (93 kg)	Jr	Houston, TX
F	23	Majok Kuath	6 ft 8 in (2.03 m)	205 lb (93 kg)	Jr	Salt Lake City, UT
G	24	Hansel Enmanuel	6 ft 6 in (1.98 m)	175 lb (79 kg)	Fr	Los Mina, Dominican Republic
C	32	Jordan Wilmore	7 ft 3 in (2.21 m)	310 lb (141 kg)	Jr	Memphis, TN
G	35	Karlin Hardy	6 ft 4 in (1.93 m)	180 lb (82 kg)	RS Fr	Lake Charles, LA
F	44	Dayne Prim	6 ft 6 in (1.98 m)	195 lb (88 kg)	Jr	Aurora, CO

Head coach

- Corey Gipson (Austin Peay)

Assistant coach(es)

- Rodney Hamilton (Georgia State)
- Tony Holliday (California Miramar)
- Tim Ward (Central Methodist)

Legend

- (C) Team captain
- (S) Suspended
- (I) Ineligible
- (W) Walk-on
- Injured
- Current redshirt

Roster
Last update: May 28, 2024

== Schedule and results ==
Date time, TV	Rank^{#}	Opponent^{#}	Result	Record	Site (attendance) city, state
Non-conference regular season
November 7, 2022*; 8:00 p.m., ESPN+		at No. 25 Texas Tech	L 49–73	0–1	United Supermarkets Arena (15,098); Lubbock, TX
November 10, 2022*; 12:00 p.m., ESPN+		Ouachita Baptist	W 79–68	1–1	Prather Coliseum (1,264); Natchitoches, LA
November 12, 2022*; 7:00 p.m., ESPN+		Illinois State	L 67–69	1–2	Prather Coliseum (1,295); Natchitoches, LA
November 14, 2022*; 7:00 p.m., ESPN+		at No. 15 TCU	W 64–63	2–2	Schollmaier Arena (5,038); Fort Worth, TX
November 17, 2022*; 7:00 p.m., ESPN+		at Illinois State	W 70–67	3–2	CEFCU Arena (3,098); Normal, IL
November 26, 2022*; 5:30 p.m., ESPN+		at Central Arkansas; UCA MTE	W 74–66 ^{OT}	4–2	Farris Center (1,575); Conway, AR
November 27, 2022*; 1:00 p.m.		vs. Bethune–Cookman; UCA MTE	W 69–66	5–2	Farris Center (215); Conway, AR
December 1, 2022*; 8:00 p.m., ESPN+		at Stephen F. Austin	W 102–96	6–2	William R. Johnson Coliseum (2,239); Nacogdoches, TX
December 4, 2022*; 3:30 p.m., ESPN+		at Southern Miss	W 84–82	7–2	Reed Green Coliseum (1,430); Hattiesburg, MS
December 10, 2022*; 3:30 p.m., ESPN+		Louisiana–Monroe	W 91–73	8–2	Prather Coliseum (1,627); Natchitoches, LA
December 17, 2022*; 2:00 p.m., CUSA.tv		at Rice	L 73–110	8–3	Tudor Fieldhouse (1,771); Houston, TX
December 20, 2022*; 7:00 p.m., ESPN+		at No. 12 Baylor	L 48–58	8–4	Ferrell Center (8,200); Waco, TX
December 27, 2022*; 7:00 p.m., SECN		at Texas A&M	L 52–64	8–5	Reed Arena (6,551); College Station, TX
Southland regular season
December 31, 2022; 2:30 p.m., ESPN+		Texas A&M–Corpus Christi	L 59–65	8–6 (0–1)	Prather Coliseum (1,345); Natchitoches, LA
January 5, 2023; 7:30 p.m., ESPN+		at McNeese	L 77–92	8–7 (0–2)	The Legacy Center (3,304); Lake Charles, LA
January 7, 2023; 3:30 p.m., ESPN+		Nicholls	W 68–48	9–7 (1–2)	Prather Coliseum (1,412); Natchitoches, LA
January 12, 2023; 8:00 p.m., ESPN+		McNeese	W 89–75	10–7 (2–2)	Prather Coliseum (1,295); Natchitoches, LA
January 14, 2023; 3:00 p.m., ESPN+		at Nicholls	L 63–77	10–8 (2–3)	Stopher Gymnasium (611); Thibodaux, LA
January 19, 2023; 7:30 p.m., ESPN+		at Southeastern	W 91–81 ^{OT}	11–8 (3–3)	University Center (1,405); Hammond, LA
January 21, 2023; 4:00 p.m., ESPN+		at New Orleans	W 88–65	12–8 (4–3)	Lakefront Arena (1,093); New Orleans, LA
January 26, 2023; 8:00 p.m., ESPN+		Houston Christian	W 82–63	13–8 (5–3)	Prather Coliseum (1,675); Natchitoches, LA
January 28, 2023; 3:30 p.m., ESPN+		Lamar	W 80–65	14–8 (6–3)	Prather Coliseum (1,447); Natchitoches, LA
February 2, 2023; 7:00 p.m., ESPN+		at Houston Christian	W 94–76	15–8 (7–3)	Sharp Gymnasium (918); Houston, TX
February 4, 2023; 6:00 p.m., ESPN+		at Lamar	W 72–68	16–8 (8–3)	Montagne Center (1,953); Beaumont, TX
February 9, 2023; 8:00 p.m., ESPN+		at Texas A&M–Commerce	W 88–82	17–8 (9–3)	University Field House (427); Commerce, TX
February 11, 2023; 3:30 p.m., ESPN+		Texas A&M–Commerce	W 72–64	18–8 (10–3)	Prather Coliseum (1,512); Natchitoches, LA
February 16, 2023; 8:00 p.m., ESPN+		Southeastern	W 81–76	19–8 (11–3)	Prather Coliseum (1,407); Natchitoches, LA
February 18, 2023; 3:30 p.m., ESPN+		New Orleans	L 65–68	19–9 (11–4)	Prather Coliseum (1,515); Natchitoches, LA
February 23, 2023; 7:30 p.m., ESPN+		at Incarnate Word	W 71–66	20–9 (12–4)	McDermott Center (215); San Antonio, TX
February 25, 2023; 5:30 p.m., ESPN+		at Texas A&M–Corpus Christi	L 75–83	20–10 (12–5)	American Bank Center (337); Corpus Christi, TX
March 1, 2023; 8:00 p.m., ESPN+		Incarnate Word	W 81–64	21–10 (13–5)	Prather Coliseum (1,568); Natchitoches, LA
Southland tournament
March 7, 2023; 8:00 p.m., ESPN+	(2)	vs. (7) New Orleans; Semifinals	W 74–70	22–10	The Legacy Center; Lake Charles, LA
March 8, 2023; 4:00 p.m., ESPN2	(2)	vs. (1) Texas A&M–Corpus Christi; Championship	L 71–75	22–11	The Legacy Center; Lake Charles, LA
*Non-conference game. ^{#}Rankings from AP poll. (#) Tournament seedings in parentheses. All times are in Central.

== See also ==
- 2022–23 Northwestern State Lady Demons basketball team
