= 2022–23 New Orleans Privateers men's basketball team =

American college basketball season

2022–23 New Orleans Privateers men's basketball
- Conference: Southland Conference
- Record: 12–20 (7–11 Southland)
- Head coach: Mark Slessinger (12th season)
- Assistant coaches: Jody Bailey; Kris Arkenberg; Jay Smith
- Home arena: Lakefront Arena

2022–23 Southland Conference men's basketball standings
| | Conf. | | | | Overall |
| Team | W | | L | PCT | W | | L | PCT |
|---|---|---|---|---|---|---|---|---|
| Texas A&M–Corpus Christi † | 14 | – | 4 | .778 | 24 | – | 11 | .686 |
| Northwestern State | 13 | – | 5 | .722 | 22 | – | 11 | .667 |
| Southeastern Louisiana | 12 | – | 6 | .667 | 18 | – | 14 | .563 |
| Nicholls | 11 | – | 7 | .611 | 16 | – | 15 | .516 |
| Texas A&M–Commerce* | 9 | – | 9 | .500 | 13 | – | 20 | .394 |
| Houston Christian | 7 | – | 11 | .389 | 10 | – | 22 | .313 |
| New Orleans | 7 | – | 11 | .389 | 12 | – | 20 | .375 |
| McNeese | 6 | – | 12 | .333 | 11 | – | 23 | .324 |
| Incarnate Word | 6 | – | 12 | .333 | 12 | – | 19 | .387 |
| Lamar | 5 | – | 13 | .278 | 9 | – | 22 | .290 |
† 2023 Southland tournament winner * ineligible for the 2023 NCAA tournament due to transition period

The 2022–23 New Orleans Privateers men's basketball team represented the University of New Orleans during the 2022–23 NCAA Division I men's basketball season. The Privateers were led by 12th-year head coach Mark Slessinger and played their home games at Lakefront Arena as members of the Southland Conference.

== Previous season ==
The Privateers finished the 2021–22 season 18–14, 10–4 in Southland play to finish in sixth place. In the Southland tournament, they defeated McNeese in the second round, before falling to Southeastern in the semifinals. The Privateers were invited to the 2022 The Basketball Classic. Their season ended with a loss to Portland.

== Preseason polls ==
=== Southland Conference Poll ===
The Southland Conference released its preseason poll on October 25, 2022. Receiving 2 first place votes and 129 votes overall, the Privateers were picked to finish third in the conference.

| Predicted finish | Team | Votes (1st place) |
|---|---|---|
| 1 | Texas A&M–Corpus Christi | 149 (11) |
| 2 | Nicholls | 137 (6) |
| 3 | New Orleans | 129 (2) |
| 4 | Southeastern | 105 |
| 5 | McNeese | 97 |
| 6 | Northwestern State | 92 |
| 7 | Texas A&M–Commerce | 56 |
| 8 | Houston Christian | 55 (1) |
| 9 | Lamar | 44 |
| 10 | Incarnate Word | 36 |

=== Preseason All Conference ===
Tyson Jackson and Simeon Kirkland were selected as a second team members.

== Roster ==
2022–23 New Orleans Privateers men's basketball team
Players
Coaches

| Pos. | # | Name | Height | Weight | Year | Hometown |
|---|---|---|---|---|---|---|
| G | 0 | Daniel Sackey | 5 ft 9 in (1.75 m) | 175 lb (79 kg) | Sr | Winnipeg, Canada |
| G | 1 | Jordan Johnson | 6 ft 1 in (1.85 m) | 170 lb (77 kg) | Jr | Memphis, Tennessee |
| G | 2 | Kmani Doughty | 6 ft 5 in (1.96 m) | 195 lb (88 kg) | So | Brooklyn, New York |
| F | 4 | Omarion Henry | 6 ft 7 in (2.01 m) | 205 lb (93 kg) | Fr | St. Louis, Missouri |
| F | 5 | Tyson Jackson | 6 ft 9 in (2.06 m) | 245 lb (111 kg) | Jr | Fairburn, Georgia |
| G | 10 | Marquez Cooper | 6 ft 4 in (1.93 m) | 195 lb (88 kg) | GS | St. Petersburg, Florida |
| F | 11 | Simeon Kirkland | 6 ft 10 in (2.08 m) | 225 lb (102 kg) | Sr | Ocala, Florida |
| G | 12 | Spencer Simes | 6 ft 2 in (1.88 m) | 205 lb (93 kg) | Sr | North Little Rock, Arkansas |
| G | 13 | Jamond Vincent | 6 ft 4 in (1.93 m) | 215 lb (98 kg) | Fr | New Orleans, Louisiana |
| G | 20 | Khaleb Wilson-Rouse | 6 ft 2 in (1.88 m) | 185 lb (84 kg) | Jr | Chicago, Illinois |
| F | 22 | Darrius Washington | 6 ft 8 in (2.03 m) | 230 lb (104 kg) | So | Louisville, Kentucky |
| G | 23 | Preston Murphy, Jr. | 6 ft 1 in (1.85 m) | 175 lb (79 kg) | Fr | Barrington, Rhode Island |
| G | 24 | Cole Sinclair | 6 ft 1 in (1.85 m) | 175 lb (79 kg) | Fr | Durham, North Carolina |
| G | 32 | Dorian Hill | 6 ft 2 in (1.88 m) | 165 lb (75 kg) | RS Fr | Hampton, Virginia |
| F | 34 | Dillon Delatte | 6 ft 5 in (1.96 m) | 170 lb (77 kg) | Jr | New Orleans, Louisiana |

Head coach

- Mark Slessinger (Aurora)

Assistant coach(es)

- Jody Bailey (Louisville)
- Kris Arkenberg (IUPUI)
- Jay Smith (LSU–Alexandria)

Legend

- (C) Team captain
- (S) Suspended
- (I) Ineligible
- (W) Walk-on
- Injured
- Current redshirt

Roster
Last update: November 14, 2022

== Schedule and results ==
| Date time, TV | Rank^{#} | Opponent^{#} | Result | Record | Site (attendance) city, state |
Non-conference regular season
| Nov 7, 2022*; 5:30 pm, FS1 | | at Butler | L 53–89 | 0–1 | Hinkle Fieldhouse (9,122); Indianapolis, IN |
| Nov 12, 2022*; 4:00 pm, ESPN+ | | St. Francis (IL) | W 65–63 | 1–1 | Lakefront Arena (1,923); New Orleans, LA |
| Nov 17, 2022*; 7:00 pm, SEC+ | | at LSU | L 62–91 | 1–2 | Pete Maravich Assembly Center (9,224); Baton Rouge, LA |
| Nov 23, 2022*; 2:00 pm, ESPN+ | | The Citadel; Big Easy Classic | L 65–72 | 1–3 | Lakefront Arena (897); New Orleans, LA |
| Nov 24, 2022*; 2:00 pm, ESPN+ | | IUPUI; Big Easy Classic | W 87–84 | 2–3 | Lakefront Arena (715); New Orleans, LA |
| Nov 25, 2022*; 2:00 pm, ESPN+ | | Denver; Big Easy Classic | L 76–77 | 2–4 | Lakefront Arena (933); New Orleans, LA |
| Dec 3, 2022*; 4:00 pm, ESPN+ | | Louisiana | L 77–78 | 2–5 | Lakefront Arena (1,243); New Orleans, LA |
| Dec 10, 2022*; 7:30 pm, WCC Network | | at Portland | L 61–100 | 2–6 | Chiles Center (1,024); Portland, OR |
| Dec 13, 2022*; 8:00 pm, MWN | | at Boise State | L 50–91 | 2–7 | ExtraMile Arena (7,254); Boise, ID |
| Dec 19, 2022*; 7:00 pm, ESPN+ | | Dillard | W 79–71 | 3–7 | Lakefront Arena (744); New Orleans, LA |
| Dec 21, 2022*; 8:00 pm, ESPNU | | at No. 1 Purdue | L 53–74 | 3–8 | Mackey Arena (14,876); West Lafayette, IN |
Southland Conference regular season
| Dec 30, 2022; 7:00 pm, ESPN+ | | at Houston Christian | L 96–101 | 3–9 (0–1) | Sharp Gymnasium (502); Houston, TX |
| Jan 5, 2023; 7:00 pm, ESPN+ | | Lamar | W 81–55 | 4–9 (1–1) | Lakefront Arena (1,012); New Orleans, LA |
| Jan 7, 2023; 4:00 pm, ESPN+ | | Houston Christian | W 82–59 | 5–9 (2–1) | Lakefront Arena (842); New Orleans, LA |
| Jan 12, 2023; 7:30 pm, ESPN+ | | at Incarnate Word | W 85–79 ^{OT} | 6–9 (3–1) | McDermott Center (291); San Antonio, TX |
| Jan 14, 2023; 3:00 pm, ESPN+ | | at Texas A&M–Corpus Christi | L 79–97 | 6–10 (3–2) | American Bank Center (1,471); Corpus Christi, TX |
| Jan 19, 2023; 7:00 pm, ESPN+ | | Texas A&M–Commerce | L 58–63 | 6–11 (3–3) | Lakefront Arena (827); New Orleans, LA |
| Jan 21, 2023; 4:00 pm, ESPN+ | | Northwestern State | L 65–88 | 6–12 (3–4) | Lakefront Arena (1,093); New Orleans, LA |
| Jan 26, 2023; 7:30 pm, ESPN+ | | at Southeastern Louisiana | L 87–92 | 6–13 (3–5) | University Center (915); Hammond, LA |
| Jan 28, 2023; 4:00 pm, ESPN+ | | Southeastern Louisiana | L 64–80 | 6–14 (3–6) | Lakefront Arena (1,259); New Orleans, LA |
| Feb 2, 2023; 7:00 pm, ESPN+ | | Texas A&M–Corpus Christi | L 69–86 | 6–15 (3–7) | Lakefront Arena (852); New Orleans, LA |
| Feb 4, 2023; 4:00 pm, ESPN+ | | Incarnate Word | L 70–78 | 6–16 (3–8) | Lakefront Arena (949); New Orleans, LA |
| Feb 9, 2023; 7:00 pm, ESPN+ | | at Nicholls | L 59–84 | 6–17 (3–9) | Stopher Gymnasium (623); Thibodaux, LA |
| Feb 11, 2023; 4:00 pm, ESPN+ | | McNeese | L 78–79 | 6–18 (3–10) | Lakefront Arena (897); New Orleans, LA |
| Feb 16, 2023; 8:00 pm, ESPN+ | | at Texas A&M–Commerce | W 84–78 | 7–18 (4–10) | The Field House (251); Commerce, TX |
| Feb 18, 2023; 3:30 pm, ESPN+ | | at Northwestern State | W 68–65 | 8–18 (5–10) | Prather Coliseum (1,515); Natchitoches, LA |
| Feb 23, 2023; 7:00 pm, ESPN+ | | Nicholls | W 88–82 | 9–18 (6–10) | Lakefront Arena (1,137); New Orleans, LA |
| Feb 25, 2023; 6:00 pm, ESPN+ | | at Lamar | W 84–79 | 10–18 (7–10) | Montagne Center (1,988); Beaumont, TX |
| Mar 1, 2023; 7:30 pm, ESPN+ | | at McNeese | L 73–80 | 10–19 (7–11) | The Legacy Center (1,626); Lake Charles, LA |
Southland Tournament
| March 5, 2023; 7:30 pm, ESPN+ | (7) | vs. (6) Houston Christian; First round | W 90–69 | 11–19 | The Legacy Center (1,059); Lake Charles, LA |
| March 6, 2023; 7:30 pm, ESPN+ | (7) | vs. (3) Southeastern Louisiana; Second round | W 82–78 | 12–19 | The Legacy Center; Lake Charles, LA |
| March 7, 2023; 8:00 pm, ESPN+ | (7) | vs. (2) Northwestern State; Semifinals | L 70–74 | 12–20 | The Legacy Center; Lake Charles, LA |
*Non-conference game. ^{#}Rankings from AP Poll. (#) Tournament seedings in parentheses. All times are in Central Time.

== See also ==
2022–23 New Orleans Privateers women's basketball team
