= 2022–23 Houston Christian Huskies men's basketball team =

American college basketball season

2022–23 Houston Christian Huskies men's basketball
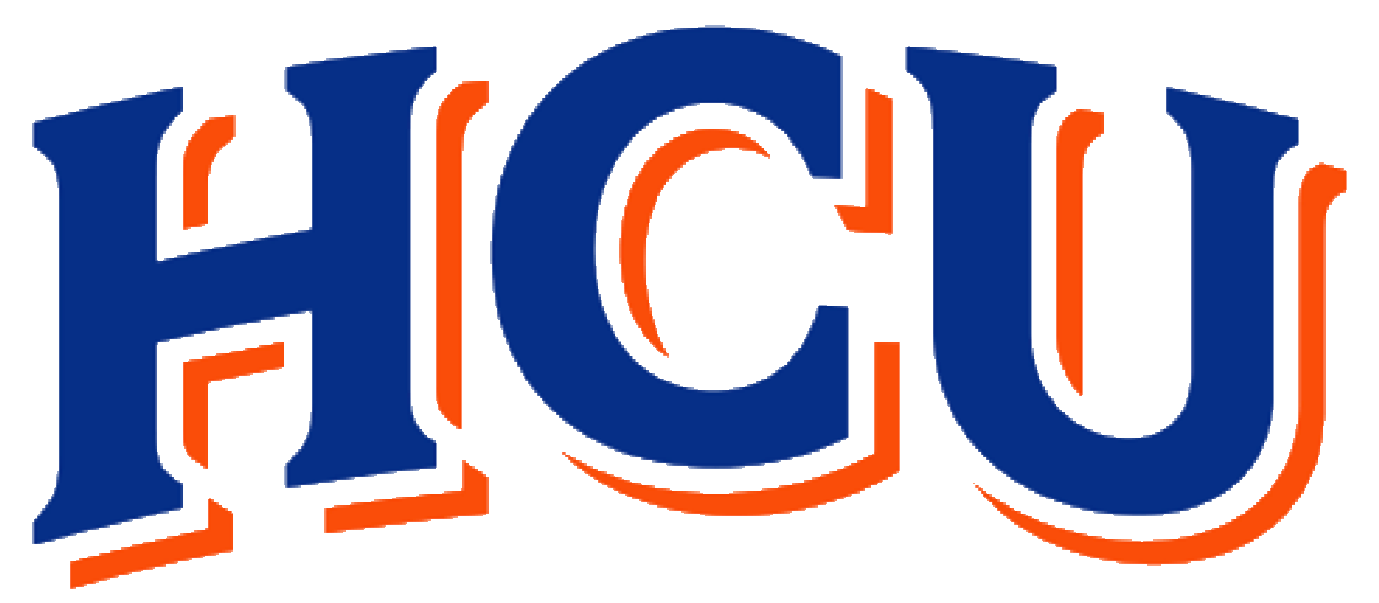
- Conference: Southland Conference
- Record: 10–22 (7–11 Southland)
- Head coach: Ron Cottrell (32nd season)
- Assistant coaches: Steven Key; Jud Kinne; Byron Rimm II
- Home arena: Sharp Gymnasium

2022–23 Southland Conference men's basketball standings
| | Conf. | | | | Overall |
| Team | W | | L | PCT | W | | L | PCT |
|---|---|---|---|---|---|---|---|---|
| Texas A&M–Corpus Christi † | 14 | – | 4 | .778 | 24 | – | 11 | .686 |
| Northwestern State | 13 | – | 5 | .722 | 22 | – | 11 | .667 |
| Southeastern Louisiana | 12 | – | 6 | .667 | 18 | – | 14 | .563 |
| Nicholls | 11 | – | 7 | .611 | 16 | – | 15 | .516 |
| Texas A&M–Commerce* | 9 | – | 9 | .500 | 13 | – | 20 | .394 |
| Houston Christian | 7 | – | 11 | .389 | 10 | – | 22 | .313 |
| New Orleans | 7 | – | 11 | .389 | 12 | – | 20 | .375 |
| McNeese | 6 | – | 12 | .333 | 11 | – | 23 | .324 |
| Incarnate Word | 6 | – | 12 | .333 | 12 | – | 19 | .387 |
| Lamar | 5 | – | 13 | .278 | 9 | – | 22 | .290 |
† 2023 Southland tournament winner * ineligible for the 2023 NCAA tournament due to transition period

The 2022–23 Houston Christian Huskies men's basketball team represented Houston Christian University in the 2022–23 NCAA Division I men's basketball season. The Huskies, led by 32nd-year head coach Ron Cottrell, played their home games at Sharp Gymnasium in Houston, Texas as members of the Southland Conference. They finished the season 10–22, 7–11 in Southland play, to finish in a tie for sixth place. As the No. 6 seed in the Southland tournament, they lost New Orleans in the first round.

The season marked the first as Houston Christian, the school having changed its name in September of 2022.

== Previous season ==
The Huskies finished the 2021–22 season 11–18, 6–8 in Southland play, to finish in fifth place. As the tournament's fifth seed, they defeated eighth-seeded Incarnate Word in the first round of the Southland tournament before falling to tournament champion Texas A&M–Corpus Christi in the second round.

== Preseason polls ==
=== Southland Conference Poll ===
The Southland Conference released its preseason poll on October 25, 2022. Receiving one first-place vote and 55 votes overall, the Huskies were picked to finish eighth in the conference.

| Predicted finish | Team | Votes (1st place) |
|---|---|---|
| 1 | Texas A&M–Corpus Christi | 149 (11) |
| 2 | Nicholls | 137 (6) |
| 3 | New Orleans | 129 (2) |
| 4 | Southeastern | 105 |
| 5 | McNeese | 97 |
| 6 | Northwestern State | 92 |
| 7 | Texas A&M–Commerce | 56 |
| 8 | Houston Christian | 55 (1) |
| 9 | Lamar | 44 |
| 10 | Incarnate Word | 36 |

=== Preseason All Conference ===
Darius Lee, who was killed in a mass shooting in Harlem, the New York City neighborhood where he grew up, during the offseason after having led the Huskies in scoring and rebounding in 2021–22, was posthumously selected Preseason Player of the Year.

== Roster ==
2022–23 Houston Christian Huskies men's basketball team
Players
Coaches

| Pos. | # | Name | Height | Weight | Year | Hometown |
|---|---|---|---|---|---|---|
| C | 0 | Zach Iyeyemi | 6 ft 9 in (2.06 m) | 263 lb (119 kg) | Sr | Cypress, TX |
| G | 2 | Pierce Bazil | 6 ft 3 in (1.91 m) | 175 lb (79 kg) | Fr | Lincoln, NE |
| G | 3 | Brycen Long | 6 ft 2 in (1.88 m) | 181 lb (82 kg) | Jr | Gilbert, AZ |
| C | 4 | Bonke Maring | 6 ft 10 in (2.08 m) | 258 lb (117 kg) | Sr | Cypress, TX |
| G | 5 | Jason Thompson | 6 ft 7 in (2.01 m) | 210 lb (95 kg) | Sr | Charlotte, NC |
| G | 10 | Andrew King | 6 ft 3 in (1.91 m) | 189 lb (86 kg) | Fr | Phoenix, AZ |
| F | 11 | Tristan Moore | 6 ft 7 in (2.01 m) | 198 lb (90 kg) | So | Albuquerque, NM |
| F | 12 | Deshon Proctor | 6 ft 5 in (1.96 m) | 205 lb (93 kg) | So | Tyrone, GA |
| G | 13 | Maks Klanjscek | 6 ft 5 in (1.96 m) | 205 lb (93 kg) | Sr | Ljubljana, Slovenia |
| G | 14 | Nathan Self | 6 ft 3 in (1.91 m) | 187 lb (85 kg) | So | Houston, TX |
| F | 15 | Anthony Jr. Harris | 6 ft 5 in (1.96 m) | 190 lb (86 kg) | Fr | Aurora, CO |
| F | 20 | Chigozie Achara | 6 ft 8 in (2.03 m) | 215 lb (98 kg) | Jr | Palmdale, CA |
| F | 21 | Nate Hudson | 6 ft 6 in (1.98 m) | 230 lb (104 kg) | Jr | Philadelphia, PA |
| G | 22 | Marques Gates | 6 ft 0 in (1.83 m) | 197 lb (89 kg) | RS Fr | Selma, TX |
| G/F | 23 | Darius Lee | 6 ft 6 in (1.98 m) | 230 lb (104 kg) | Sr | Harlem, NY |
| G | 24 | Jake Arnold | 6 ft 2 in (1.88 m) | 205 lb (93 kg) | RS Fr | Katy, TX |
| G | 25 | Braden Bostwick | 6 ft 3 in (1.91 m) | 165 lb (75 kg) | Fr | Cleveland, TX |
| F | 33 | Sam Hofman | 6 ft 5 in (1.96 m) | 279 lb (127 kg) | Sr | Brussels, Belgium |

Head coach

- Ron Cottrell (Arkansas)

Assistant coach(es)

- Steven Key (Houston Baptist)
- Jud Kinne (Albion)
- Byron Rimm II (Cal State LA)

Legend

- (C) Team captain
- (S) Suspended
- (I) Ineligible
- (W) Walk-on
- Injured
- Current redshirt

Roster
Last update: September 20, 2025

== Schedule and results ==
| Date time, TV | Rank^{#} | Opponent^{#} | Result | Record | Site (attendance) city, state |
Non-conference regular season
| November 7, 2022*; 6:00 p.m. | | at FIU | L 66–77 | 0–1 | Ocean Bank Convocation Center (1,104); Miami, FL |
| November 10, 2022*; 8:00 p.m., LHN | | at No. 12 Texas | L 31–82 | 0–2 | Moody Center (10,763); Austin, TX |
| November 14, 2022*; 7:00 p.m., ESPN+ | | Champion Christian | W 119–97 | 1–2 | Sharp Gymnasium (592); Houston, TX |
| November 18, 2022*; 7:00 p.m., ESPN+ | | Western Michigan; Owl Invitational | L 84–90 | 1–3 | Sharp Gymnasium (502); Houston, TX |
| November 19, 2022*; 7:00 p.m., ESPN+ | | Georgia Southern; Owl Invitational | L 77–84 | 1–4 | Sharp Gymnasium (608); Houston, TX |
| November 21, 2022*; 7:00 p.m. | | at Rice; Owl Invitational | L 67–76 | 1–5 | Tudor Fieldhouse (1,105); Houston, TX |
| November 26, 2022*; 11:00 a.m., SECN | | at Missouri | L 69–105 | 1–6 | Mizzou Arena (7,610); Columbia, MO |
| December 1, 2022*; 7:00 p.m., ESPN+ | | Denver | L 83–93 | 1–7 | Sharp Gymnasium (633); Houston, TX |
| December 4, 2022*; 2:00 p.m., ESPN+ | | Southwestern Adventist | W 94–62 | 2–7 | Sharp Gymnasium (301); Houston, TX |
| December 6, 2022*; 7:00 p.m., ESPN+ | | UMaine Fort Kent | W 100–33 | 3–7 | Sharp Gymnasium (320); Houston, TX |
| December 10, 2022*; 7:00 p.m., ESPN+ | | Texas–Rio Grande Valley | L 82–95 | 3–8 | Sharp Gymnasium (591); Houston, TX |
| December 18, 2022*; 6:00 p.m., ESPN+ | | at Texas–Rio Grande Valley; UTRGV South Padre Island Battle on the Beach | L 90–100 | 3–9 | South Padre Island Convention Centre (676); South Padre Island, TX |
| December 21, 2022*; 1:00 p.m., ESPN+ | | at Texas Tech | L 67–111 | 3–10 | United Supermarkets Arena (10,025); Lubbock, TX |
Southland Conference season
| December 30, 2022; 7:00 p.m., ESPN+ | | New Orleans | W 101–96 | 4–10 (1–0) | Sharp Gymnasium (502); Houston, TX |
| January 5, 2023; 7:30 p.m., ESPN+ | | at Southeastern | L 59–71 | 4–11 (1–1) | University Center (567); Hammond, LA |
| January 7, 2023; 4:00 p.m., ESPN+ | | at New Orleans | L 59–82 | 4–12 (1–2) | Lakefront Arena (842); New Orleans, LA |
| January 12, 2023; 7:00 p.m., ESPN+ | | Texas A&M–Commerce | W 68–59 | 5–12 (2–2) | Sharp Gymnasium (613); Houston, TX |
| January 14, 2023; 3:30 p.m., ESPN+ | | at McNeese | W 90–81 | 6–12 (3–2) | The Legacy Center (2,219); Lake Charles, LA |
| January 19, 2023; 7:00 p.m., ESPN+ | | Incarnate Word | L 78–89 | 6–13 (3–3) | Sharp Gymnasium (713); Houston, TX |
| January 21, 2023; 7:00 p.m., ESPN+ | | Texas A&M–Corpus Christi | W 90–78 | 7–13 (4–3) | Sharp Gymnasium (1,000); Houston, TX |
| January 26, 2023; 8:00 p.m., ESPN+ | | at Northwestern State | L 63–82 | 7–14 (4–4) | Prather Coliseum (1,675); Natchitoches, LA |
| January 28, 2023; 4:30 p.m., ESPN+ | | at Texas A&M–Commerce | L 76–77 | 7–15 (4–5) | The Field House (403); Commerce, TX |
| February 2, 2023; 7:00 p.m., ESPN+ | | Northwestern State | L 76–94 | 7–16 (4–6) | Sharp Gymnasium (918); Houston, TX |
| February 4, 2023; 7:00 p.m., ESPN+ | | Nicholls | L 91–92 | 7–17 (4–7) | Sharp Gymnasium (771); Houston, TX |
| February 9, 2023; 7:30 p.m., ESPN+ | | at Texas A&M–Corpus Christi | L 68–91 | 7–18 (4–8) | American Bank Center (1,350); Corpus Christi, TX |
| February 11, 2023; 4:00 p.m., ESPN+ | | at Incarnate Word | W 84–78 | 8–18 (5–8) | McDermott Center (427); San Antonio, TX |
| February 16, 2023; 7:00 p.m., ESPN+ | | at Lamar | L 75–91 | 8–19 (5–9) | Montagne Center (1,917); Beaumont, TX |
| February 18, 2023; 7:00 p.m., ESPN+ | | Lamar | W 93–74 | 9–19 (6–9) | Sharp Gymnasium (1,000); Houston, TX |
| February 23, 2023; 7:00 p.m., ESPN+ | | McNeese | W 85–80 | 10–19 (7–9) | Sharp Gymnasium (701); Houston, TX |
| February 25, 2023; 3:00 p.m., ESPN+ | | at Nicholls | L 64–68 | 10–20 (7–10) | Stopher Gymnasium (521); Thibodaux, LA |
| March 1, 2023; 7:00 p.m., ESPN+ | | Southeastern | L 64–80 | 10–21 (7–11) | Sharp Gymnasium (677); Houston, TX |
Southland tournament
| March 5, 2023; 7:30 p.m., ESPN+ | (6) | vs. (7) New Orleans; First round | L 69–90 | 10–22 | The Legacy Center (1,059); Lake Charles, LA |
*Non-conference game. ^{#}Rankings from AP poll. (#) Tournament seedings in parentheses. All times are in Central.

== See also ==
- 2022–23 Houston Christian Huskies women's basketball team
