= 2022–23 Texas A&M–Corpus Christi Islanders men's basketball team =

American college basketball season

2022–23 Texas A&M–Corpus Christi Islanders men's basketball

Southland regular season and tournament champions

NCAA tournament, First Round
- Conference: Southland Conference
- Record: 24–11 (14–4 Southland)
- Head coach: Steve Lutz (2nd season)
- Assistant coaches: Ralph Davis; Cole Dewey; Jim Shaw
- Home arena: American Bank Center; Dugan Wellness Center

2022–23 Southland Conference men's basketball standings
	Conf.				Overall
Team	W		L	PCT	W		L	PCT
Texas A&M–Corpus Christi †	14	–	4	.778	24	–	11	.686
Northwestern State	13	–	5	.722	22	–	11	.667
Southeastern Louisiana	12	–	6	.667	18	–	14	.563
Nicholls	11	–	7	.611	16	–	15	.516
Texas A&M–Commerce*	9	–	9	.500	13	–	20	.394
Houston Christian	7	–	11	.389	10	–	22	.313
New Orleans	7	–	11	.389	12	–	20	.375
McNeese	6	–	12	.333	11	–	23	.324
Incarnate Word	6	–	12	.333	12	–	19	.387
Lamar	5	–	13	.278	9	–	22	.290
† 2023 Southland tournament winner * ineligible for the 2023 NCAA tournament due to transition period

The 2022–23 Texas A&M–Corpus Christi Islanders men's basketball team represent Texas A&M University–Corpus Christi in the 2022–23 NCAA Division I men's basketball season as members of the Southland Conference. The Islanders are led by second-year head coach Steve Lutz. With the exception of four games at the Dugan Wellness Center, all home games are at American Bank Center. Both arenas are located in Corpus Christi, Texas. They finished the season 24–11, 14–4 in Southland play to win the regular season championship. They defeated McNeese and Northwestern State to win the Southland tournament for the second consecutive year. As a result, they received the conference’s automatic bid to the NCAA tournament, as a No. 16 seed in the South region. In the First Four, they defeated Southeast Missouri State before losing to overall No. 1 seed Alabama in the First Round.

== Previous season ==
The Islanders finished the season 23–12, 7–7 in Southland play to finish in fourth place. As the No. 4 seed, they defeated Houston Baptist, Nicholls, and Southeastern to win the SLC tournament. They received the conference’s automatic bid to the 2022 NCAA Division I men's basketball tournament as a No. 16 seed in the Midwest Region, where they lost in the First Four to Texas Southern.

== Preseason polls ==
=== Southland Conference Poll ===
The Southland Conference released its preseason poll on October 25, 2022. Receiving 11 first place votes and 149 votes overall, the Islanders were picked to finish first in the conference.

Predicted finish	Team	Votes (1st place)
1	Texas A&M–Corpus Christi	149 (11)
2	Nicholls	137 (6)
3	New Orleans	129 (2)
4	Southeastern	105
5	McNeese	97
6	Northwestern State	92
7	Texas A&M–Commerce	56
8	Houston Christian	55 (1)
9	Lamar	44
10	Incarnate Word	36

=== Preseason All Conference ===
Terrion Murdix, Isaac Mushila, and Trevian Tennyson were selected as members of the Preseason All Conference first team. Simeon Fryer was selected as a second team member.

== Roster ==
2022–23 Texas A&M–Corpus Christi Islanders men's basketball team
Players
Coaches

Pos.	#	Name	Height	Weight	Year	Hometown
G	0	Trevian Tennyson	6 ft 4 in (1.93 m)	180 lb (82 kg)	Sr	Arlington, Texas
F/C	1	Jasman Sangha	6 ft 8 in (2.03 m)	225 lb (102 kg)	RS Jr	Brampton, Ontario
G	2	Jordan Roberts	6 ft 4 in (1.93 m)	170 lb (77 kg)	So	Grand Prairie, Texas
G	3	Tyrese Nickelson	6 ft 2 in (1.88 m)	170 lb (77 kg)	Sr	Waterloo, Iowa
G	4	Jalen Jackson	5 ft 11 in (1.8 m)	180 lb (82 kg)	Sr	San Antonio, Texas
G	5	Jourdyn Grandberry	6 ft 3 in (1.91 m)	170 lb (77 kg)	Fr	North Richland Hills, Texas
F	10	Isaac Mushila	6 ft 5 in (1.96 m)	208 lb (94 kg)	Sr	Lubumbashi, Congo
G	11	Terrion Murdix	6 ft 1 in (1.85 m)	170 lb (77 kg)	Sr	Springfield, Illinois
F	12	Owen Dease	6 ft 8 in (2.03 m)	180 lb (82 kg)	RS Fr	Evansville, Indiana
F	13	De'Lazarus Keys	6 ft 8 in (2.03 m)	230 lb (104 kg)	RS Sr	Orlando, Florida
G	14	Jaren Marshall	6 ft 1 in (1.85 m)	168 lb (76 kg)	Fr	Omaha, Nebraska
F	21	Aaron Harden	6 ft 7 in (2.01 m)	190 lb (86 kg)	Fr	San Antonio, Texas
G	22	Simeon Fryer	6 ft 5 in (1.96 m)	185 lb (84 kg)	RS Sr	Philadelphia, Pennsylvania
G	23	Ross Williams	5 ft 10 in (1.78 m)	162 lb (73 kg)	GS	Detroit, Michigan
C	32	Stephen Giwa	6 ft 9 in (2.06 m)	220 lb (100 kg)	Jr	Houston, Texas
C	42	Conner Kern	7 ft 3 in (2.21 m)	280 lb (127 kg)	So	Prosper, Texas

Head coach

- Steve Lutz (Texas Lutheran)

Assistant coach(es)

- Ralph Davis (Texas A&M–Kingsville)
- Cole Dewey (Campbell)
- Jim Shaw (Grinnell)

Legend

- (C) Team captain
- (S) Suspended
- (I) Ineligible
- (W) Walk-on
- Injured
- Current redshirt

Roster
Last update: November 14, 2022

== Schedule and results ==
Date time, TV	Rank^{#}	Opponent^{#}	Result	Record	Site (attendance) city, state
Non-conference Regular season
Nov 7, 2022*; 6:30 pm, SEC+		at Mississippi State	L 44–63	0–1	Humphrey Coliseum (6,254); Starkville, MS
Nov 11, 2022*; 7:00 pm, ESPN+		UTSA	W 75–55	1–1	Dugan Wellness Center (1,400); Corpus Christi, TX
Nov 14, 2022*; 7:00 pm, ESPN+		Trinity (TX)	W 91–73	2–1	American Bank Center (1,314); Corpus Christi, TX
Nov 17, 2022*; 7:00 pm, ESPN+		UTRGV; South Texas Showdown	W 97–75	3–1	American Bank Center (1,493); Corpus Christi, TX
Nov 22, 2022*; 5:00 pm		vs. Cal State Bakersfield; UTEP Tournament	L 63–73	3–2	Don Haskins Center (N/A); El Paso, TX
Nov 23, 2022*; 5:00 pm		vs. Alcorn; UTEP Tournament	W 98–67	4–2	Don Haskins Center (N/A); El Paso, TX
Nov 25, 2022*; 3:00 pm, ESPN+		at UTEP; UTEP Tournament	L 67–72	4–3	Don Haskins Center (4,320); El Paso, TX
Nov 30, 2022*; 6:30 pm, ESPN+		at UTRGV; South Texas Showdown	L 82–89	4–4	UTRGV Fieldhouse (865); Edinburg, TX
Dec 7, 2022*; 7:00 pm, ESPN+		Texas Lutheran	W 100–63	5–4	American Bank Center (1,218); Corpus Christi, TX
Dec 13, 2022*; 6:30 pm, PAC12		at No. 9 Arizona	L 61–99	5–5	McKale Center (13,854); Tucson, AZ
Dec 16, 2022*; 11:00 am, ESPN+		Schreiner	W 104–69	6–5	Dugan Wellness Center (1,273); Corpus Christi, TX
Dec 20, 2022*; 2:00 pm, ESPN+		at Oklahoma State	L 58–81	6–6	Gallagher-Iba Arena (6,007); Stillwater, OK
Dec 28, 2022*; 4:00 pm, ESPN+		Our Lady of the Lake	W 88–74	7–6	Dugan Wellness Center (771); Corpus Christi, TX
Southland Conference Regular season
Dec 31, 2022; 2:30 pm, ESPN+		at Northwestern State	W 65–59	8–6 (1–0)	Prather Coliseum (1,345); Natchitoches, LA
Jan 4, 2023; 7:30 pm, ESPN+		Incarnate Word	W 91–61	9–6 (2–0)	Dugan Wellness Center (1,400); Corpus Christi, TX
Jan 7, 2023; 4:00 pm, ESPN+		at Incarnate Word	W 80–71	10–6 (3–0)	McDermott Center (N/A); San Antonio, TX
Jan 12, 2023; 7:30 pm, ESPN+		Southeastern	L 82–85 ^{OT}	10–7 (3–1)	American Bank Center (1,319); Corpus Christi, TX
Jan 14, 2023; 3:30 pm, ESPN+		New Orleans	W 97–79	11–7 (4–1)	American Bank Center (1,471); Corpus Christi, TX
Jan 19, 2023; 7:00 pm, ESPN+		at Lamar	L 66–68	11–8 (4–2)	Montagne Center (1,671); Beaumont, TX
Jan 21, 2023; 7:00 pm, ESPN+		at Houston Christian	L 78–90	11–9 (4–3)	Sharp Gymnasium (1,000); Houston, TX
Jan 26, 2023; 7:30 pm, ESPN+		Nicholls	W 96–86	12–9 (5–3)	American Bank Center (1,519); Corpus Christi, TX
Jan 28, 2023; 3:30 pm, ESPN+		McNeese	W 83–72	13–9 (6–3)	American Bank Center (2,110); Corpus Christi, TX
Feb 2, 2023; 8:23 pm, ESPN+		at New Orleans	W 86–69	14–9 (7–3)	Lakefront Arena (852); New Orleans, LA
Feb 4, 2023; 3:30 pm, ESPNews		at Southeastern	W 83–72	15–9 (8–3)	University Center (3,107); Hammond, LA
Feb 9, 2023; 7:30 pm, ESPN+		Houston Christian	W 91–68	16–9 (9–3)	American Bank Center (1,350); Corpus Christi, TX
Feb 11, 2023; 3:30 pm, ESPN+		Lamar	W 61–52	17–9 (10–3)	American Bank Center (1,644); Corpus Christi, TX
Feb 16, 2023; 7:00 pm, ESPN+		at Nicholls	W 78–74	18–9 (11–3)	Stopher Gymnasium (688); Thibodaux, LA
Feb 18, 2023; 3:30 pm, ESPN+		at McNeese	W 77–54	19–9 (12–3)	The Legacy Center (1,677); Lake Charles, LA
Feb 23, 2023; 7:30 pm, ESPN+		Texas A&M–Commerce	L 80–84	19–10 (12–4)	American Bank Center (1,634); Corpus Christi, TX
Feb 25, 2023; 4:30 pm, ESPN+		Northwestern State	W 83–75	20–10 (13–4)	American Bank Center (337); Corpus Christi, TX
March 1, 2023; 8:00 pm, ESPN+		at Texas A&M–Commerce	W 93–88 ^{OT}	21–10 (14–4)	The Field House (631); Commerce, TX
Southland Tournament
March 7, 2023; 6:30 pm, ESPNU	(1)	vs. (8) McNeese; Semifinals	W 80–63	22–10	The Legacy Center; Lake Charles, LA
March 8, 2023; 5:00 pm, ESPN2	(1)	vs. (2) Northwestern State; Championship	W 75–71	23–10	The Legacy Center (813); Lake Charles, LA
NCAA tournament
March 14, 2023*; 5:40 pm, TruTV	(16 S)	vs. (16 S) Southeast Missouri State; First Four	W 75–71	24–10	UD Arena; Dayton, OH
March 16, 2023*; 1:45 p.m., CBS	(16 S)	vs. (1 S) No. 1 Alabama; First Round	L 75–96	24–11	Legacy Arena (15,126); Birmingham, AL
*Non-conference game. ^{#}Rankings from AP Poll. (#) Tournament seedings in parentheses. S=South. All times are in Central.

== See also ==
- 2022–23 Texas A&M–Corpus Christi Islanders women's basketball team
