= 2022–23 McNeese Cowboys basketball team =

American college basketball season

2022–23 McNeese Cowboys basketball
- Conference: Southland Conference
- Record: 11–23 (6–12 Southland)
- Head coach: John Aiken (2nd season)
- Associate head coach: Thomas Gray
- Assistant coaches: Michael Moynihan; Brandon Shingles
- Home arena: The Legacy Center; Burton Coliseum

2022–23 Southland Conference men's basketball standings
	Conf.				Overall
Team	W		L	PCT	W		L	PCT
Texas A&M–Corpus Christi †	14	–	4	.778	24	–	11	.686
Northwestern State	13	–	5	.722	22	–	11	.667
Southeastern Louisiana	12	–	6	.667	18	–	14	.563
Nicholls	11	–	7	.611	16	–	15	.516
Texas A&M–Commerce*	9	–	9	.500	13	–	20	.394
Houston Christian	7	–	11	.389	10	–	22	.313
New Orleans	7	–	11	.389	12	–	20	.375
McNeese	6	–	12	.333	11	–	23	.324
Incarnate Word	6	–	12	.333	12	–	19	.387
Lamar	5	–	13	.278	9	–	22	.290
† 2023 Southland tournament winner * ineligible for the 2023 NCAA tournament due to transition period

The 2022–23 McNeese Cowboys basketball team represented McNeese State University in the 2022–23 NCAA Division I men's basketball season. The Cowboys, led by second-year head coach John Aiken, played their home games on-campus at The Legacy Center in Lake Charles, Louisiana as members of the Southland Conference.

== Previous season ==
The Cowboys finished the 2021–22 season with an 11–22 overall record and were 4–10 in conference play. They qualified as the seventh seed in the 2022 Southland Conference men's basketball tournament winning their first round game against sixth seed Northwestern State 80–67. Their season ended with a second round loss to third seeded New Orleans 78–82.

== Preseason polls ==
=== Southland Conference Poll ===
The Southland Conference released its preseason poll on October 25, 2022. Receiving 97 votes overall, the Cowboys were picked to finish fifth in the conference.

Predicted finish	Team	Votes (1st place)
1	Texas A&M–Corpus Christi	149 (11)
2	Nicholls	137 (6)
3	New Orleans	129 (2)
4	Southeastern	105
5	McNeese	97
6	Northwestern State	92
7	Texas A&M–Commerce	56
8	Houston Christian	55 (1)
9	Lamar	44
10	Incarnate Word	36

=== Preseason All Conference ===
Christian Shumate was selected as a member of the Preseason All Conference first team.

== Roster ==
2022–23 McNeese Cowboys men's basketball team
Players
Coaches

Pos.	#	Name	Height	Weight	Year	Hometown
F	0	Ty McMillan	6 ft 9 in (2.06 m)	225 lb (102 kg)	Jr	New Orleans, Louisiana
F	1	Trae English	6 ft 0 in (1.83 m)	175 lb (79 kg)	So	Baltimore, Maryland
G	2	Donovan Oday	6 ft 3 in (1.91 m)	185 lb (84 kg)	Fr	Arlington, Texas
G	3	Rhyjon Blackwell	6 ft 1 in (1.85 m)	170 lb (77 kg)	Jr	Baldwin, New York
G	5	Johnathan Massie	6 ft 6 in (1.98 m)	188 lb (85 kg)	So	Houston, Texas
F	10	Roberts Berze	6 ft 7 in (2.01 m)	210 lb (95 kg)	Jr	Sigulda, Latvia
G	11	Rashad Bolden	6 ft 0 in (1.83 m)	175 lb (79 kg)	So	Jackson, Mississippi
F	12	Dionjahe Thomas	6 ft 8 in (2.03 m)	230 lb (104 kg)	Fr	Houma, Louisiana
G/F	13	Justin Norris	6 ft 6 in (1.98 m)	189 lb (86 kg)	Fr	Houston, Texas
F	14	Wesley Fields	5 ft 10 in (1.78 m)	155 lb (70 kg)	Fr	Baton Rouge, Louisiana
G	15	Zach Scott	6 ft 4 in (1.93 m)	180 lb (82 kg)	Sr	Miami, Florida
F	21	Zach Blackwell	6 ft 9 in (2.06 m)	190 lb (86 kg)	So	Lake Charles, Louisiana
G	22	Harwin Francois	6 ft 5 in (1.96 m)	200 lb (91 kg)	RS Sr	Fort Myers, Florida
F	23	Malachi Rhodes	6 ft 8 in (2.03 m)	240 lb (109 kg)	Jr	Atlanta, Georgia
F	24	Christian Shumate	6 ft 7 in (2.01 m)	205 lb (93 kg)	So	Chicago, Illinois

Head coach

- John Aiken (Southern Maine)

Assistant coach(es)

- Thomas Gray (Mississippi College)
- Michael Moynihan (North Georgia)
- Brandon Shingles (Morehead State)

Legend

- (C) Team captain
- (S) Suspended
- (I) Ineligible
- (W) Walk-on
- Injured
- Current redshirt

Roster
Last update: November 9, 2022

== Schedule and results ==
Date time, TV	Rank^{#}	Opponent^{#}	Result	Record	Site (attendance) city, state
Non-conference regular season
Nov 7, 2022*; 7:00 pm		Champion Christian	W 110–54	1–0	The Legacy Center (1,581); Lake Charles, LA
Nov 11, 2022*; 6:00 pm, ESPN+		at Tulane	L 58–75	1–1	Devlin Fieldhouse (1,363); New Orleans, LA
Nov 18, 2022*; 4:30 pm, ESPN+		Western Carolina; McNeese MTE	L 69–88	1–2	The Legacy Center (1,497); Lake Charles, LA
Nov 19, 2022*; 1:30 pm		Lindenwood; McNeese MTE	L 60–78	1–3	The Legacy Center (1,520); Lake Charles, LA
Nov 20, 2022*; 1:30 pm, ESPN+		Lamar; McNeese MTE	W 66–57	2–3	The Legacy Center (1,536); Lake Charles, LA
Nov 23, 2022*; 3:00 pm, ESPN+		at No. 7 Baylor	L 60–89	2–4	Ferrell Center (8,181); Waco, TX
Nov 28, 2022*; 6:00 pm, ESPN+		at UT Martin	L 83–86	2–5	Skyhawk Arena (1,104); Martin, TN
Nov 30, 2022*; 6:15 pm, SECN		at No. 13 Tennessee	L 40–76	2–6	Thompson–Boling Arena (15,927); Knoxville, TN
Dec 5, 2022*; 7:00 pm		Ecclesia College; Exhibition Game	W 103–68	–	The Legacy Center; Lake Charles, LA
Dec 9, 2022*; 7:00 pm, ESPN+		at Northern Iowa	W 52–49	3–6	McLeod Center (3,620); Cedar Falls, IA
Dec 11, 2022*; 5:00 pm, ESPN+		at No. 20 Iowa State	L 40–77	3–7	Hilton Coliseum (12,886); Ames, IA
Dec 15, 2022*; 7:00 pm, ESPN+		Louisiana	L 70–78	3–8	The Legacy Center (2,101); Lake Charles, LA
Dec 18, 2022*; 2:00 pm, ESPN+		at Southern Miss	L 67–86	3–9	Reed Green Coliseum (2,600); Hattiesburg, MS
Dec 21, 2022*; 7:00 pm, ESPN+		at No. 3 Houston	L 44–83	3–10	Fertitta Center (7,418); Houston, TX
Southland Conference regular season
Dec 31, 2022; 4:00 pm, ESPN+		at Lamar; Battle of the Border	W 81–62	4–10 (1–0)	Montagne Center (1,898); Beaumont, TX
Jan 5, 2022; 7:30 pm, ESPN+		Northwestern State	W 92–77	5–10 (2–0)	The Legacy Center (3,304); Lake Charles, LA
Jan 7, 2022; 3:30 pm, ESPN+		Texas A&M–Commerce	L 80–82 ^{OT}	5–11 (2–1)	The Legacy Center (2,096); Lake Charles, LA
Jan 12, 2022; 8:00 pm, ESPN+		at Northwestern State	L 75–89	5–12 (2–2)	Prather Coliseum (1,295); Natchitoches, LA
Jan 14, 2022; 3:30 pm, ESPN+		Houston Christian	L 81–90	5–13 (2–3)	The Legacy Center (2,219); Lake Charles, LA
Jan 19, 2022; 7:00 pm		at Nicholls	L 64–73	5–14 (2–4)	Stopher Gymnasium (1,522); Thibodaux, LA
Jan 21, 2022; 3:30 pm, ESPN+		Nicholls	L 68–71	5–15 (2–5)	The Legacy Center (2,337); Lake Charles, LA
Jan 26, 2022; 7:30 pm, ESPN+		at Incarnate Word	L 65–70	5–16 (2–6)	McDermott Center (N/A); San Antonio, TX
Jan 28, 2022; 3:30 pm, ESPN+		at Texas A&M–Corpus Christi	L 72–83	5–17 (2–7)	American Bank Center (2,110); Corpus Christi, TX
Feb 2, 2022; 7:30 pm, ESPN+		Lamar; Battle of the Border	L 63–70	5–18 (2–8)	The Legacy Center (1,850); Lake Charles, LA
Feb 4, 2022; 3:30 pm, ESPN+		at Texas A&M–Commerce	L 58–60	5–19 (2–9)	The Field House (311); Commerce, TX
Feb 9, 2022; 7:30 pm, ESPN+		Southeastern Louisiana	W 69–66	6–19 (3–9)	The Legacy Center (2,112); Lake Charles, LA
Feb 11, 2022; 4:00 pm, ESPN+		at New Orleans	W 79–78	7–19 (4–9)	Lakefront Arena (897); New Orleans, LA
Feb 16, 2022; 7:30 pm, ESPN+		Incarnate Word	W 78–76 ^{OT}	8–19 (5–9)	The Legacy Center (1,813); Lake Charles, LA
Feb 18, 2022; 3:30 pm, ESPN+		Texas A&M–Corpus Christi	L 54–77	8–20 (5–10)	The Legacy Center (1,677); Lake Charles, LA
Feb 23, 2022; 7:00 pm, ESPN+		at Houston Christian	L 80–85	8–21 (5–11)	Sharp Gymnasium (701); Houston, TX
Feb 25, 2022; 3:30 pm, ESPN+		at Southeastern Louisiana	L 75–78 ^{OT}	8–22 (5–12)	University Center (830); Hammond, LA
Mar 1, 2022; 7:30 pm, ESPN+		New Orleans	W 80–73	9–22 (6–12)	The Legacy Center (1,626); Lake Charles, LA
Southland Tournament
March 5, 2023; 1:00 pm, ESPN+	(8)	(5) Texas A&M–Commerce; First round	W 79–78	10–22	The Legacy Center (2,572); Lake Charles, LA
March 6, 2023; 5:00 pm, ESPN+	(8)	(4) Nicholls; Second round	W 77–71	11–22	The Legacy Center (976); Lake Charles, LA
March 7, 2023; 5:30 pm, ESPNU	(8)	(1) Texas A&M–Corpus Christi; Semifinals	L 63–80	11–23	The Legacy Center (1,206); Lake Charles, LA
*Non-conference game. ^{#}Rankings from AP Poll. (#) Tournament seedings in parentheses. All times are in Central.

== See also ==
- 2022–23 McNeese State Cowgirls basketball team
