= 2022–23 Nicholls Colonels men's basketball team =

American college basketball season

2022–23 Nicholls Colonels men's basketball
- Conference: Southland Conference
- Record: 16–15 (11–7 Southland)
- Head coach: Austin Claunch (5th season)
- Associate head coach: Nick Bowman
- Assistant coaches: Darion Brown; Joey Brooks
- Home arena: Stopher Gymnasium

2022–23 Southland Conference men's basketball standings
	Conf.				Overall
Team	W		L	PCT	W		L	PCT
Texas A&M–Corpus Christi †	14	–	4	.778	24	–	11	.686
Northwestern State	13	–	5	.722	22	–	11	.667
Southeastern Louisiana	12	–	6	.667	18	–	14	.563
Nicholls	11	–	7	.611	16	–	15	.516
Texas A&M–Commerce*	9	–	9	.500	13	–	20	.394
Houston Christian	7	–	11	.389	10	–	22	.313
New Orleans	7	–	11	.389	12	–	20	.375
McNeese	6	–	12	.333	11	–	23	.324
Incarnate Word	6	–	12	.333	12	–	19	.387
Lamar	5	–	13	.278	9	–	22	.290
† 2023 Southland tournament winner * ineligible for the 2023 NCAA tournament due to transition period

The 2022–23 Nicholls State Colonels men's basketball team represented Nicholls State University in the 2022–23 NCAA Division I men's basketball season. The Colonels, led by fifth-year head coach Austin Claunch, played their home games at Stopher Gymnasium in Thibodaux, Louisiana as members of the Southland Conference. They finished the season 16–15, 11–7 in Southland play, to finish in fourth place.

== Previous season ==
The Colonels finished the 2021–22 season 21–12, 11–3 in Southland play, to finish as regular-season champions. They lost in the semifinals of the Southland tournament to Texas A&M–Corpus Christi. As a No. 1 seed who failed to win their conference tournament, they received an automatic bid to the National Invitation Tournament where they lost in the first round to SMU.

== Preseason ==
=== Southland Conference poll ===
The Southland Conference released its preseason poll on October 25, 2022. The Colonels were picked to finish second in the conference.

Predicted finish	Team	Votes (1st place)
1	Texas A&M–Corpus Christi	149 (11)
2	Nicholls	137 (6)
3	New Orleans	129 (2)
4	Southeastern	105
5	McNeese	97
6	Northwestern State	92
7	Texas A&M–Commerce	56
8	Houston Christian	55 (1)
9	Lamar	44
10	Incarnate Word	36

=== Preseason All-Conference ===
Guard Latrell Jones was named to the conference's preseason first team. Forward Manny Littles and guard Pierce Spencer were named to the conference's second team.

== Roster ==
2022–23 Nicholls State Colonels men's basketball team
Players
Coaches

Pos.	#	Name	Height	Weight	Year	Hometown
F	0	Marek Nelson	6 ft 7 in (2.01 m)	200 lb (91 kg)	GS	Plano, TX
F	1	Josh Sr. LeBlanc	6 ft 7 in (2.01 m)	230 lb (104 kg)	Sr	Baton Rouge, LA
G	2	Tyrease Terrell	6 ft 4 in (1.93 m)	165 lb (75 kg)	Sr	Slidell, LA
G	3	Micah Thomas	6 ft 0 in (1.83 m)	175 lb (79 kg)	Jr	Oklahoma City, OK
G	4	Caleb Huffman	6 ft 4 in (1.93 m)	185 lb (84 kg)	Sr	Broken Arrow, OK
G	5	Pierce Spencer	6 ft 3 in (1.91 m)	175 lb (79 kg)	Jr	Porter, TX
F	10	Ryan Maxwell	6 ft 7 in (2.01 m)	250 lb (113 kg)	So	Jacksonville, AR
G	11	Latrell Jones	6 ft 5 in (1.96 m)	180 lb (82 kg)	Sr	New Orleans, LA
F	13	Mekhi Collins	6 ft 8 in (2.03 m)	225 lb (102 kg)	So	Cedar Hill, TX
F	14	Taylor Blanchard	6 ft 5 in (1.96 m)	165 lb (75 kg)	Jr	Morgan City, LA
G	21	Jalen White	6 ft 4 in (1.93 m)	180 lb (82 kg)	Jr	Pasadena, TX
F	22	Manny Littles	6 ft 7 in (2.01 m)	215 lb (98 kg)	Sr	Lanett, AL
F	23	Edoardo Del Cadia	6 ft 8 in (2.03 m)	240 lb (109 kg)	RS Sr	Senigallia, Italy
G	24	Quinn Strander	5 ft 10 in (1.78 m)	175 lb (79 kg)	Jr	Thibodaux, LA
G	25	Lance-Amir Paul	6 ft 0 in (1.83 m)	185 lb (84 kg)	RS Jr	Kingston, Jamaica

Head coach

- Austin Claunch (Emory)

Assistant coach(es)

- Nick Bowman (Eastern Kentucky)
- Darion Brown (Our Lady of the Lake)
- Joey Brooks (Notre Dame)

Legend

- (C) Team captain
- (S) Suspended
- (I) Ineligible
- (W) Walk-on
- Injured
- Current redshirt

Roster

== Schedule and results ==
Date time, TV	Rank^{#}	Opponent^{#}	Result	Record	Site (attendance) city, state
Non-conference regular season
November 7, 2022*; 8:30 p.m., P12N		at No. 17 Arizona	L 75–117	0–1	McKale Center (12,635); Tucson, AZ
November 10, 2022*; 9:00 p.m., MW Network		at Wyoming	L 68–79	0–2	Arena-Auditorium (4,498); Laramie, WY
November 13, 2022*; 3:00 p.m.		Carver	Game cancelled		Stopher Gymnasium; Thibodaux, LA
November 19, 2022*; 8:00 p.m., BYU TV		at BYU	L 73–87	0–3	Marriott Center (13,745); Provo, UT
November 22, 2022*; 7:00 p.m., ESPN+		Jarvis Christian	W 97–52	1–3	Stopher Gymnasium (605); Thibodaux, LA
November 25, 2022*; 6:00 p.m., FloHoops		vs. UC Irvine; Las Vegas Holiday Challenge	L 56–83	1–4	Orleans Arena; Las Vegas, NV
November 26, 2022*; 6:00 p.m., FloHoops		vs. UC San Diego; Las Vegas Holiday Challenge	W 72–70	2–4	Orleans Arena; Las Vegas, NV
November 29, 2022*; 7:00 p.m., ESPN+		Champion Christian	W 115–50	3–4	Stopher Gymnasium (333); Thibodaux, LA
December 7, 2022*; 7:00 p.m., ESPN+		at Texas Tech	L 71–78	3–5	United Supermarkets Arena (12,682); Lubbock, TX
December 11, 2022*; 2:00 p.m., ESPN+		Rust College	W 85–65	4–5	Stopher Gymnasium (450); Thibodaux, LA
December 15, 2022*; 7:00 p.m., ESPN+		Southeastern	W 88–73	5–5 (1–0)	Stopher Gymnasium (685); Thibodaux, LA
December 17, 2022*; 2:00 p.m., SECN		No. 17 Mississippi State	L 66–68	5–6	Humphrey Coliseum (6,023); Starkville, MS
December 19, 2022*; 6:00 p.m., ESPN+		Trinity Baptist	W 90–46	6–6	Stopher Gymnasium (421); Thibodaux, LA
December 28, 2022*; 7:00 p.m., ESPN+		at No. 12 Baylor	L 56–85	6–7	Ferrell Center (8,577); Waco, TX
Southland regular season
January 5, 2023; 8:00 p.m., ESPN+		at Texas A&M–Commerce	W 66–63	7–7 (2–0)	The Field House (246); Commerce, TX
January 7, 2023; 3:30 p.m., ESPN+		Northwestern State	L 48–68	7–8 (2–1)	Prather Coliseum (1,412); Natchitoches, LA
January 12, 2023; 7:00 p.m., ESPN+		at Lamar	L 66-69	7–9 (2–2)	Montagne Center (1,613); Beaumont, TX
January 14, 2023; 3:00 p.m., ESPN+		Northwestern State	W 77–63	8–9 (3–2)	Stopher Gymnasium (611); Thibodaux, LA
January 19, 2023; 7:00 p.m., ESPN+		McNeese	W 73–64	9–9 (4–2)	Stopher Gymnasium (1,522); Thibodaux, LA
January 21, 2023; 3:30 p.m., ESPN+		McNeese	W 71–68	10–9 (5–2)	The Legacy Center (2,337); Lake Charles, LA
January 26, 2023; 7:30 p.m., ESPN+		Texas A&M–Corpus Christi	L 86–96	10–10 (5–3)	American Bank Center (1,519); Corpus Christi, TX
January 28, 2023; 4:00 p.m., ESPN+		at Incarnate Word	L 67–69	10–11 (5–4)	McDermott Center (384); San Antonio, TX
February 2, 2023; 7:00 p.m.		Texas A&M–Commerce	Game postponed until February 20 due to icy weather conditions in Texas		Stopher Gymnasium; Thibodaux, LA
February 4, 2023; 7:00 p.m., ESPN+		at Houston Christian	W 92–91	11–11 (6–4)	Sharp Gymnasium (771); Houston, TX
February 9, 2023; 7:00 p.m., ESPN+		New Orleans	W 84–59	12–11 (7–4)	Stopher Gymnasium (623); Thibodaux, LA
February 11, 2023; 3:30 p.m., ESPN+		at Southeastern	W 88–77	13–11 (8–4)	University Center (447); Hammond, LA
February 16, 2023; 7:00 p.m., ESPN+		Texas A&M–Corpus Christi	L 74–78	13–12 (8–5)	Stopher Gymnasium (688); Thibodaux, LA
February 18, 2023; 3:00 p.m., ESPN3		Incarnate Word	W 84–74	14–12 (9–5)	Stopher Gymnasium (544); Thibodaux, LA
February 20, 2023; 7:00 p.m., ESPN+		Texas A&M–Commerce	L 71–72	14–13 (9–6)	Stopher Gymnasium (611); Thibodaux, LA
February 23, 2023; 7:00 p.m., ESPN+		at New Orleans	L 82–88	14–14 (9–7)	Lakefront Arena (1,137); New Orleans, LA
February 25, 2023; 3:00 p.m., ESPN+		Houston Christian	W 68–64	15–14 (10–7)	Stopher Gymnasium (521); Thibodaux, LA
March 1, 2023; 7:00 p.m., ESPN+		Lamar	W 64–60	16–14 (11–7)	Stopher Gymnasium (543); Thibodaux, LA
Southland tournament
March 6, 2023; 5:00 p.m., ESPN+	(4)	vs. (8) McNeese; Second round	L 71–77	16–15	The Legacy Center; Lake Charles, LA
*Non-conference game. ^{#}Rankings from AP poll. (#) Tournament seedings in parentheses. All times are in Central.

== See also ==
- 2022–23 Nicholls Colonels women's basketball team
