= 2022–23 Southeastern Louisiana Lions basketball team =

American college basketball season

2022–23 Southeastern Louisiana Lions basketball
- Conference: Southland Conference
- Record: 18–14 (12–6 Southland)
- Head coach: David Kiefer (4th season)
- Associate head coach: Kyle Roane
- Assistant coaches: Riley Conroy; Mike Randle
- Home arena: University Center (Capacity: 7,500)

2022–23 Southland Conference men's basketball standings
	Conf.				Overall
Team	W		L	PCT	W		L	PCT
Texas A&M–Corpus Christi †	14	–	4	.778	24	–	11	.686
Northwestern State	13	–	5	.722	22	–	11	.667
Southeastern Louisiana	12	–	6	.667	18	–	14	.563
Nicholls	11	–	7	.611	16	–	15	.516
Texas A&M–Commerce*	9	–	9	.500	13	–	20	.394
Houston Christian	7	–	11	.389	10	–	22	.313
New Orleans	7	–	11	.389	12	–	20	.375
McNeese	6	–	12	.333	11	–	23	.324
Incarnate Word	6	–	12	.333	12	–	19	.387
Lamar	5	–	13	.278	9	–	22	.290
† 2023 Southland tournament winner * ineligible for the 2023 NCAA tournament due to transition period

The 2022–23 Southeastern Louisiana Lions basketball team represented Southeastern Louisiana University in the 2022–23 NCAA Division I men's basketball season. The Lions, led by fourth-year head coach David Kiefer, played their home games at the University Center in Hammond, Louisiana as members of the Southland Conference.

== Previous season ==
The Lions finished the 2021–22 season 19–15, 10–4 in Southland play, to finish tied for second place. They defeated New Orleans in the semifinals of the Southland tournament, before falling to Texas A&M–Corpus Christi in the championship game. They were invited to The Basketball Classic, where they would lose to South Alabama in the first round.

== Preseason polls ==
=== Southland Conference poll ===
The Southland Conference released its preseason poll on October 25, 2022. Receiving 105 votes overall, the Lions were picked to finish fourth in the conference.

Predicted finish	Team	Votes (1st place)
1	Texas A&M–Corpus Christi	149 (11)
2	Nicholls	137 (6)
3	New Orleans	129 (2)
4	Southeastern	105
5	McNeese	97
6	Northwestern State	92
7	Texas A&M–Commerce	56
8	Houston Christian	55 (1)
9	Lamar	44
10	Incarnate Word	36

=== Preseason All Conference ===
No Lions were selected as members of a preseason all-conference team.

== Roster ==
2022–23 Southeastern Louisiana Lions men's basketball team
Players
Coaches

Pos.	#	Name	Height	Weight	Year	Previous school	Hometown
G	0	Sami Pissis	6 ft 3 in (1.91 m)	195 lb (88 kg)	Fr	Trinity Christian School	Paris, France
G	1	Avery Wilson	6 ft 4 in (1.93 m)	225 lb (102 kg)	GS	Forest Park HS; Boston College	Forest Park, GA
G	2	Roscoe Eastmond	5 ft 9 in (1.75 m)	150 lb (68 kg)	Jr	Wheeler HS; Denver	Marietta, GA
G	3	Roger McFarlane	6 ft 5 in (1.96 m)	205 lb (93 kg)	So	University HS; Dodge City JC	Fort Lauderdale, FL
G	10	Mehdi Pissis	6 ft 5 in (1.96 m)	220 lb (100 kg)	So	West Nottingham Academy; Missouri State/West Plains CC	Paris, France
G	11	Boogie Anderson	6 ft 4 in (1.93 m)	205 lb (93 kg)	GS	Chandler HS; South Dakota	Chandler, AZ
G	12	Matthew Strange	5 ft 11 in (1.8 m)	170 lb (77 kg)	GS	St. Pius HS; New Mexico JC	The Woodlands, TX
F	15	Brody Rowbury	6 ft 11 in (2.11 m)	290 lb (132 kg)	Fr	Meridian HS; Sunrise Christian Academy	Meridian, ID
G	20	Alec Woodard	6 ft 2 in (1.88 m)	200 lb (91 kg)	GS	Morgan County HS; Austin Peay	Rutledge, GA
G/F	22	Nick Caldwell	6 ft 7 in (2.01 m)	215 lb (98 kg)	Jr	Dutchtown HS	Prairieville, LA
G	24	Christian Agnew	6 ft 2 in (1.88 m)	185 lb (84 kg)	Sr	John Glenn HS; UTEP	Detroit, MI
G	30	Jake Berner	6 ft 2 in (1.88 m)	195 lb (88 kg)	Fr	St. Thomas Aquinas HS	Ponchatoula, LA
C	33	Max Brackmann	7 ft 2 in (2.18 m)	270 lb (122 kg)	So	Staedtische Loehne	Löhne, Germany

Head coach

- David Kiefer (Kansas State)

Assistant coach(es)

- Kyle Roane (Southern Miss)
- Riley Conroy (Tulane)
- Mike Randle (Eastern New Mexico)

Legend

- (C) Team captain
- (S) Suspended
- (I) Ineligible
- (W) Walk-on
- Injured
- Current redshirt

Roster
Last update: October 26, 2022

== Schedule and results ==
Date time, TV	Rank^{#}	Opponent^{#}	Result	Record	Site (attendance) city, state
Regular season
November 7, 2022*; 7:30 pm, ESPN3		Loyola (New Orleans)	W 90–72	1–0	University Center (744); Hammond, LA
November 11, 2022*; 8:30 pm, MWN		at Colorado State	L 69–80	1–1	Moby Arena (5,320); Fort Collins, CO
November 13, 2022*; 3:00 pm, MWN		at Wyoming	W 76–72	2–1	Arena-Auditorium; Laramie, WY
November 18, 2022*; 3:00 pm		vs. Kennesaw State; Appalachian State MTE	L 68–72	2–2	Holmes Center (109); Boone, NC
November 19, 2022*; 3:00 pm		vs. Campbell; Appalachian State MTE	W 70–69	3–2	Holmes Center (197); Boone, NC
November 20, 2022*; 1:30 pm, ESPN+		at Appalachian State; Appalachian State MTE	L 74–83	3–3	Holmes Center (1553); Boone, NC
November 26, 2022*; 12:00 pm		William Carey	W 96–62	4–3	University Center (421); Hammond, LA
November 30, 2022*; 7:30 pm, FS1		at Xavier	L 63–95	4–4	Cintas Center (9,811); Cincinnati, OH
December 3, 2022*; 1:00 pm, ESPN+		at Dayton	L 74–80	4–5	UD Arena (13,407); Dayton, OH
December 7, 2022*; 7:00 pm, ESPN+		Belhaven	W 107–71	5–5	University Center (489); Hammond, LA
December 15, 2022; 7:00 pm, ESPN+		at Nicholls	L 73–88	5–6 (0–1)	Stopher Gym (685); Thibodaux, LA
December 17, 2022*; 1:00 pm, ESPN+		Troy	L 71–77	5–7	University Center (403); Hammond, LA
December 21, 2022*; 7:00 pm, ESPN+		Southern	W 80–62	6–7	University Center (515); Hammond, LA
December 30, 2022*; 6:00 pm, SECN+		at Vanderbilt	L 55–93	6–8	Memorial Gymnasium (5,384); Nashville, TN
January 5, 2023; 7:30 pm, ESPN+		Houston Christian	W 71–59	7–8 (1–1)	University Center (567); Hammond, LA
January 7, 2023; 3:30 pm, ESPN+		Lamar	W 89–84 ^{OT}	8–8 (2–1)	University Center (378); Hammond, LA
January 12, 2023; 7:30 pm, ESPN+		at Texas A&M–Corpus Christi	W 89–82 ^{OT}	9–8 (3–1)	American Bank Center (1,319); Corpus Christi, TX
January 14, 2023; 4:00 pm, ESPN+		at Incarnate Word	W 75–71	10–8 (4–1)	McDermott Center (391); San Antonio, TX
January 19, 2023; 7:30 pm, ESPN+		Northwestern State	L 81–91 ^{OT}	10–9 (4–2)	University Center (1,405); Hammond, LA
January 21, 2023; 3:30 pm, ESPN+		Texas A&M–Commerce	W 79–73	11–9 (5-2)	University Center (912); Hammond, LA
January 26, 2023; 7:30 pm, ESPN+		New Orleans	W 92–87	12–9 (6–2)	University Center (915); Hammond, LA
January 28, 2023; 4:00 pm, ESPN+		at New Orleans	W 80–64	13–9 (7–2)	Lakefront Arena (1,259); New Orleans, LA
February 2, 2023; 7:30 pm, ESPN+		Incarnate Word	W 77–67	14–9 (8–2)	University Center (920); Hammond, LA
February 4, 2023; 3:30 pm, ESPNews		Texas A&M–Corpus Christi	L 72–83	14–10 (8–3)	University Center (3,107); Hammond, LA
February 9, 2023; 7:30 pm, ESPN+		at McNeese State	L 66–69	14–11 (8–4)	The Legacy Center (2,112); Lake Charles, LA
February 11, 2023; 3:30 pm, ESPN+		Nicholls	L 77–88	14–12 (8–5)	University Center (447); Hammond, LA
February 16, 2023; 8:00 pm, ESPN+		at Northwestern State	L 76–81	14–13 (8–6)	Prather Coliseum (1,407); Natchitoches, LA
February 18, 2023; 4:30 pm, ESPN+		at Texas A&M–Commerce	W 78–76 ^{OT}	15–13 (9–6)	The Field House (521); Commerce, TX
February 23, 2023; 7:00 pm, ESPN+		at Lamar	W 83–60	16–13 (10–6)	Montagne Center (1,776); Beaumont, TX
February 25, 2023; 3:30 pm, ESPN+		McNeese State	W 78–75 ^{OT}	17–13 (11–6)	University Center (830); Hammond, LA
March 1, 2023; 7:00 pm, ESPN+		at Houston Christian	W 80–64	18–13 (12–6)	Sharp Gym (677); Houston, TX
Southland tournament
March 6, 2023; 7:30 pm, ESPN+	(3)	vs. (7) New Orleans; Second round	L 78–82	18–14	The Legacy Center; Lake Charles, LA
*Non-conference game. ^{#}Rankings from AP poll. (#) Tournament seedings in parentheses. All times are in Central.

== See also ==
- 2022–23 Southeastern Louisiana Lady Lions basketball team
