= 2022–23 Incarnate Word Cardinals men's basketball team =

US college basketball team

2022–23 Incarnate Word Cardinals men's basketball
- Conference: Southland Conference
- Record: 12–19 (6–12 Southland)
- Head coach: Carson Cunningham (5th season)
- Assistant coaches: Taylor Land (5th season); Chris Artis (4th season); Carlito Labarda (1st season)
- Home arena: McDermott Center (Capacity: 2,000)

2022–23 Southland Conference men's basketball standings
	Conf.				Overall
Team	W		L	PCT	W		L	PCT
Texas A&M–Corpus Christi †	14	–	4	.778	24	–	11	.686
Northwestern State	13	–	5	.722	22	–	11	.667
Southeastern Louisiana	12	–	6	.667	18	–	14	.563
Nicholls	11	–	7	.611	16	–	15	.516
Texas A&M–Commerce*	9	–	9	.500	13	–	20	.394
Houston Christian	7	–	11	.389	10	–	22	.313
New Orleans	7	–	11	.389	12	–	20	.375
McNeese	6	–	12	.333	11	–	23	.324
Incarnate Word	6	–	12	.333	12	–	19	.387
Lamar	5	–	13	.278	9	–	22	.290
† 2023 Southland tournament winner * ineligible for the 2023 NCAA tournament due to transition period

The 2022–23 Incarnate Word Cardinals men's basketball team represented the University of the Incarnate Word during the 2022–23 NCAA Division I men's basketball season. The Cardinals were led by fifth-year head coach Carson Cunningham and played their home games at McDermott Convocation Center in San Antonio, Texas as members of the Southland Conference. The Cardinals finished the season 12–19, 6–12 in Southland play, to finish in ninth place. They failed to qualify for the Southland tournament.

On April 11, 2023, the school fired head coach Carson Cunningham. On May 5, the school named Central Michigan associate head coach Shane Heirman the team's new head coach.

== Previous season ==
The Cardinals finished the 2021–22 season 7–25, 3–11 in Southland play, to finish in last place. They lost in the first round of the Southland tournament to Houston Baptist.

== Preseason polls ==
=== Southland Conference Poll ===
The Southland Conference released its preseason poll on October 25, 2022. Receiving 36 votes overall, the Cardinals were picked to finish tenth in the conference.

Predicted finish	Team	Votes (1st place)
1	Texas A&M–Corpus Christi	149 (11)
2	Nicholls	137 (6)
3	New Orleans	129 (2)
4	Southeastern	105
5	McNeese	97
6	Northwestern State	92
7	Texas A&M–Commerce	56
8	Houston Christian	55 (1)
9	Lamar	44
10	Incarnate Word	36

=== Preseason All-Conference ===
No Cardinals were selected to the Preseason All-Conference teams.

== Roster ==
2022–23 Incarnate Word Cardinals men's basketball team
Players
Coaches

Pos.	#	Name	Height	Weight	Year	Previous school	Hometown
SG	0	Dylan Hayman	6 ft 5 in (1.96 m)	211 lb (96 kg)	So	Healdsburg HS	Healdsburg, CA
G	1	Silas Livingston	5 ft 9 in (1.75 m)	130 lb (59 kg)	Fr	Robert G. Cole HS	San Antonio, TX
F	3	Davante Dennis	6 ft 7 in (2.01 m)	220 lb (100 kg)	RS Fr	Red Lion Area Senior HS	Baltimore, MD
G	4	Reggie Abram	5 ft 9 in (1.75 m)	175 lb (79 kg)	RS Fr	Hammond HS	Merrillville, IN
G	5	Brandon Swaby	6 ft 3 in (1.91 m)	195 lb (88 kg)	RS Sr	Northeast HS	Fort Lauderdale, FL
G	10	Jonathan Cisse	6 ft 1 in (1.85 m)	160 lb (73 kg)	Jr	St. Thomas More HS; Indian River SC	Lafayette, LA
G	11	Jah Gulley	6 ft 0 in (1.83 m)	170 lb (77 kg)	Fr	Lockhart HS	Lockhart, TX
G	12	Niki Krause	6 ft 7 in (2.01 m)	—	Fr	Billings Central Catholic HS; White Wings Hanau	Hochheim am Main, Germany
G	13	Josh Morgan	6 ft 3 in (1.91 m)	215 lb (98 kg)	Jr	Father Henry Carr Secondary School	Brampton, ON
C	15	Kevin Schutte	6 ft 10 in (2.08 m)	240 lb (109 kg)	GS	CSE Zwolle; Hofstra	Zwolle, Netherlands
G	21	Luca Barei	6 ft 6 in (1.98 m)	—	Fr	Prince Alfred College	Adelaide, Australia
F/C	23	Stephon III Payne	6 ft 9 in (2.06 m)	210 lb (95 kg)	Fr	Andrew Jackson HS	Jacksonville, FL
F/C	24	Benjamin Griscti	6 ft 11 in (2.11 m)	220 lb (100 kg)	So	Cabra Dominican College	Adelaide, Australia
G	25	Trey Miller	6 ft 2 in (1.88 m)	185 lb (84 kg)	Fr	Concordia Lutheran HS	Houston, TX
F/C	33	Gabe Beny Til	6 ft 8 in (2.03 m)	207 lb (94 kg)	Fr	Hurricane HS	South Sudan

Head coach

- Carson Cunningham (Purdue)

Assistant coach(es)

- Taylor Land (St. Edward's)
- Chris Artis (Valparaiso)
- Carlito Labarda (Purdue)

Legend

- (C) Team captain
- (S) Suspended
- (I) Ineligible
- (W) Walk-on
- Injured
- Current redshirt

Roster
Last update: September 7, 2025

== Schedule and results ==
Date time, TV	Rank^{#}	Opponent^{#}	Result	Record	Site (attendance) city, state
Non-conference regular season
November 7, 2022*; 7:30 p.m., ESPN+		North Dakota	L 57–65	0–1	McDermott Center (515); San Antonio, TX
November 12, 2022*; 5:00 p.m.		at UNLV	L 63–88	0–2	Thomas & Mack Center (4,931); Las Vegas, NV
November 15, 2022*; 6:30 p.m., ESPN+		Texas Lutheran	W 84–47	1–2	McDermott Center (145); San Antonio, TX
November 19, 2022*; 7:00 p.m., ESPN3		at Valparaiso	L 64–68	1–3	Athletics–Recreation Center (145); Valparaiso, IN
November 22, 2022*; 6:30 p.m., ESPN+		Our Lady of the Lake	W 85–76	2–3	McDermott Center (322); San Antonio, TX
November 25, 2022*; 5:00 p.m.		vs. Dartmouth; UTSA MTE	W 69–64	3–3	Convocation Center (1,341); San Antonio, TX
November 27, 2022*; 5:00 p.m.		vs. Grambling; UTSA MTE	W 63–61	4–3	Convocation Center (201); San Antonio, TX
November 28, 2022*; 6:30 p.m., CUSA.tv		at UTSA; UTSA MTE	L 62–68	4–4	Convocation Center (797); San Antonio, TX
November 30, 2022*; 6:30 p.m., ESPN+		Dallas Christian	W 112–64	5–4	McDermott Center (271); San Antonio, TX
December 3, 2022*; 3:00 p.m.		at Grambling	L 39–72	5–5	Fredrick C. Hobdy Assembly Center (343); Grambling, LA
December 11, 2022*; 2:00 p.m., ESPN+		at Kansas State	L 50–98	5–6	Bramlage Coliseum (7,042); Manhattan, KS
December 16, 2022*; 5:30 p.m., ESPN+		Bethune–Cookman	W 77–65	6–6	McDermott Center (195); San Antonio, TX
December 21, 2022*; 7:00 p.m., CUSA.tv		at FIU	L 74–79	6–7	Ocean Bank Convocation Center; Miami, FL
Southland Conference regular season
December 31, 2022; 4:30 p.m., ESPN+		at Texas A&M–Commerce	L 74–82 ^{OT}	6–8 (0–1)	The Field House (245); Commerce, TX
January 4, 2023; 7:30 p.m., ESPN+		at Texas A&M–Corpus Christi	L 61–91	6–9 (0–2)	American Bank Center (1,400); Corpus Christi, TX
January 7, 2023; 4:00 p.m., ESPN+		Texas A&M–Corpus Christi	L 71–80	6–10 (0–3)	McDermott Center; San Antonio, TX
January 12, 2023; 7:30 p.m., ESPN+		New Orleans	L 79–85 ^{OT}	6–11 (0–4)	McDermott Center (291); San Antonio, TX
January 14, 2023; 4:00 p.m., ESPN+		Southeastern Louisiana	L 71–75	6–12 (0–5)	McDermott Center (391); San Antonio, TX
January 19, 2023; 7:00 p.m., ESPN+		at Houston Christian	W 89–78	7–12 (1–5)	Sharp Gymnasium; Houston, TX
January 21, 2023; 6:00 p.m., ESPN+		at Lamar	W 70–64	8–12 (2–5)	Montagne Center; Beaumont, TX
January 26, 2023; 7:30 p.m., ESPN+		McNeese	W 70–65	9–12 (3–5)	McDermott Center (N/A); San Antonio, TX
January 28, 2023; 4:00 p.m., ESPN+		Nicholls	W 69–67	10–12 (4–5)	McDermott Center (386); San Antonio, TX
February 2, 2023; 7:30 p.m., ESPN+		at Southeastern Louisiana	L 67–77	10–13 (4–6)	University Center (920); Hammond, LA
February 4, 2023; 4:00 p.m., ESPN+		at New Orleans	W 78–70	11–13 (5–6)	Lakefront Arena (949); New Orleans, LA
February 9, 2023; 7:30 p.m., ESPN+		Lamar	L 59–68	11–14 (5–7)	McDermott Center (320); San Antonio, TX
February 11, 2023; 4:00 p.m., ESPN+		Houston Christian	L 78–84	11–15 (5–8)	McDermott Center (427); San Antonio, TX
February 16, 2023; 7:30 p.m., ESPN+		at McNeese	L 76–78 ^{OT}	11–16 (5–9)	The Legacy Center (1,813); Lake Charles, LA
February 18, 2023; 3:00 p.m., ESPN+		at Nicholls	L 74–84	11–17 (5–10)	Stopher Gymnasium (544); Thibodaux, LA
February 23, 2023; 7:30 p.m., ESPN+		Northwestern State	L 66–71	11–18 (5–11)	McDermott Center (215); San Antonio, TX
February 25, 2023; 4:00 p.m., ESPN+		Texas A&M–Commerce	W 79–75	12–18 (6–11)	McDermott Center; San Antonio, TX
March 1, 2023; 8:00 p.m., ESPN+		at Northwestern State	L 64–81	12–19 (6–12)	Prather Coliseum (1,568); Natchitoches, LA
*Non-conference game. ^{#}Rankings from AP poll. (#) Tournament seedings in parentheses. All times are in Central.

== See also ==
- 2022–23 Incarnate Word Cardinals women's basketball team
