= 2022–23 Lamar Cardinals basketball team =

American college basketball season

2022–23 Lamar Cardinals basketball
- Conference: Southland Conference
- Record: 9–22 (5–13 Southland)
- Head coach: Alvin Brooks (2nd season)
- Assistant coaches: Charles Harral (2nd season); Wendell Moore (2nd season); Mikhail McClean (2nd season)
- Home arena: Montagne Center (Capacity: 10,080)

2022–23 Southland Conference men's basketball standings
	Conf.				Overall
Team	W		L	PCT	W		L	PCT
Texas A&M–Corpus Christi †	14	–	4	.778	24	–	11	.686
Northwestern State	13	–	5	.722	22	–	11	.667
Southeastern Louisiana	12	–	6	.667	18	–	14	.563
Nicholls	11	–	7	.611	16	–	15	.516
Texas A&M–Commerce*	9	–	9	.500	13	–	20	.394
Houston Christian	7	–	11	.389	10	–	22	.313
New Orleans	7	–	11	.389	12	–	20	.375
McNeese	6	–	12	.333	11	–	23	.324
Incarnate Word	6	–	12	.333	12	–	19	.387
Lamar	5	–	13	.278	9	–	22	.290
† 2023 Southland tournament winner * ineligible for the 2023 NCAA tournament due to transition period

The 2022–23 Lamar Cardinals basketball team represented Lamar University during the 2022–23 NCAA Division I men's basketball season. The Cardinals were led by second-year head coach Alvin Brooks and played their home games at the Montagne Center in Beaumont, Texas. The Cardinals' returned as members of the Southland Conference following one season in the Western Athletic Conference. The Cardinals finished the 2022–23 season 9–22 overall and 5–13 in Southland Conference play to finish last in conference. The Cardinals failed to qualify for the SLC tournament.

== Previous season ==
The Cardinals finished the 2021–22 season 2–27, 0–18 in WAC play to finish last in conference, and went winless against D-1 opponents. The Cardinals failed to qualify for the WAC tournament.

== Offseason ==
=== Incoming transfers ===
Lamar incoming transfers
Name	Number	Pos.	Height	Weight	Year	Hometown	Previous School
Jakevion "Jay" Buckley	3	G	6'0"	162	Junior	Shelbyville, TX	Trinity Valley CC
Chris Pryor	4	G	5'11"	152	Freshman	Desoto, TX	McLennan CC
Terry Anderson	5	F	6'6"	190	Junior	Deer Park, TX	Cossatot (Arkansas)
Adam Hamilton	20	C	6'9"	210	Junior	Buckeye, AZ	Glendale CC

=== Recruits ===
Lamar incoming transfers
Name	Number	Pos.	Height	Weight	Year	Hometown	Previous School
Cody Pennebaker	0	G	6'5"	187	Freshman	Brooklyn Park, MN	Park Center HS
Nate Calmese	2	G	6'2"	164	Freshman	Gilbert, AZ	Mequite HS
Jason Thirdkill, Jr.	13	G	6'7"	189	Freshman	Detroit, MI	Home School
Yuto Yamanouchi	15	C	6'10"		Freshman	Aizuwakamatsu, Japan	Ribét Academy (CA)
James Spencer III	35	F	6'6"		Freshman	Brooklyn Park, MN	Park Center HS

== Preseason polls ==
=== Southland Conference Poll ===
The Southland Conference released its preseason poll on October 25, 2022. Receiving 44 votes overall, the Cardinals were picked to finish ninth in the conference.

Predicted finish	Team	Votes (1st place)
1	Texas A&M–Corpus Christi	149 (11)
2	Nicholls	137 (6)
3	New Orleans	129 (2)
4	Southeastern	105
5	McNeese	97
6	Northwestern State	92
7	Texas A&M–Commerce	56
8	Houston Christian	55 (1)
9	Lamar	44
10	Incarnate Word	36

=== Preseason All Conference ===
No Cardinals were selected as members of a Preseason all conference team.

== Roster ==
2022–23 Lamar Cardinals men's basketball team
Players
Coaches

Pos.	#	Name	Height	Weight	Year	Hometown
F	0	Cody Pennebaker	6 ft 5 in (1.96 m)	187 lb (85 kg)	Fr	Beaumont, Texas
G	1	Bryan Gordon	6 ft 2 in (1.88 m)	193 lb (88 kg)	RS Fr	Houston, Texas
G	2	Nate Calmese	6 ft 2 in (1.88 m)	164 lb (74 kg)	Fr	Gilbert, Arizona
G	3	Jakevion Buckley	6 ft 0 in (1.83 m)	162 lb (73 kg)	Jr	Shelbyville, Texas
G	4	Chris Pryor	5 ft 11 in (1.8 m)	152 lb (69 kg)	Jr	Desoto, Texas
F	5	Terry Anderson	6 ft 6 in (1.98 m)	190 lb (86 kg)	Jr	Deer Park, Texas
C	12	Valentin Catt	6 ft 10 in (2.08 m)	232 lb (105 kg)	So	Orangefield, Texas
F	13	Jason Thirdkill, Jr.	6 ft 7 in (2.01 m)	189 lb (86 kg)	Fr	Detroit, Michigan
C	15	Yuto Yamanouchi-Williams	6 ft 10 in (2.08 m)	—	Fr	Aizuwakamatsu Japan
C	20	Adam Hamilton	6 ft 9 in (2.06 m)	210 lb (95 kg)	Sr	Buckeye, Arizona
G	21	Trey Harris	6 ft 5 in (1.96 m)	180 lb (82 kg)	Fr	Houston, Texas
G	21	Max Pearcy	6 ft 1 in (1.85 m)	170 lb (77 kg)	Fr	Woodbine, Maryland
G	22	Casey Brooks	5 ft 9 in (1.75 m)	160 lb (73 kg)	Jr	Kingsville, Texas
G/F	24	Brock McClure	6 ft 6 in (1.98 m)	210 lb (95 kg)	So	Lumberton, Texas
F	35	James Spencer III	6 ft 6 in (1.98 m)	—	Fr	Brooklyn Park, Minnesota

Head coach

- Alvin Brooks (Lamar)

Assistant coach(es)

- Charles Harral (Texas Tech)
- Wendell Moore (Georgia Southern)
- Mikhail McClean (Houston)

Legend

- (C) Team captain
- (S) Suspended
- (I) Ineligible
- (W) Walk-on
- Injured
- Current redshirt

Roster
Last update: October 13, 2022

== Schedule and results ==
Date time, TV	Rank^{#}	Opponent^{#}	Result	Record	High points	High rebounds	High assists	Site (attendance) city, state
Exhibition
November 2, 2022*; 7:00 pm		North American	W 113–76		33 – Calmese	–	–	Montagne Center; Beaumont, TX
Non-conference regular season
November 7, 2022*; 7:00 pm, ESPN+		St. Thomas (TX)	W 63–61	1–0	23 – Pryor	10 – Anderson	4 – Buckley	Montagne Center (1,374); Beaumont, TX
November 11, 2022*; 7:00 pm, ESPN+		at No. 14 TCU	L 66–77	1–1	22 – Buckley	10 – Pryor	5 – Calmese	Schollmaier Arena (5,320); Fort Worth, TX
November 14, 2022*; 7:00 pm, ESPN+		Huston–Tillotson	W 98–69	2–1	16 – Tied (3 players)	7 – Tied (3 players)	6 – Buckley	Montagne Center (2,108); Beaumont, TX
November 18, 2022*; 2:00 pm		vs. Lindenwood; McNeese MTE	W 73–71	3–1	20 – Calmese	8 – Hamilton	7 – Buckley	The Legacy Center (211); Lake Charles, LA
November 19, 2022*; 11:00 am		vs. Western Illinois; McNeese MTE	L 91–98 ^{OT}	3–2	27 – Calmese	9 – Hamilton	6 – Pryor	The Legacy Center (221); Lake Charles, LA
November 20, 2022; 1:30 pm, ESPN+		at McNeese State; McNeese MTE	L 57–66	3–3	19 – Calmese	12 – Hamilton	3 – Tied	The Legacy Center (1,536); Lake Charles, LA
November 27, 2022*; 2:00 pm, ESPN+		at SMU	L 50–75	3–4	16 – Catt	7 – Tied	6 – Pryor	Moody Coliseum (2,884); Dallas, TX
December 1, 2022*; 7:30 pm, ESPN+		Texas State	L 55–65	3–5	25 – Calmese	10 – Pennebaker	6 – Buckley	Montagne Center (2,269); Beaumont, TX
December 5, 2022*; 6:00 pm, ESPN+		Our Lady of the Lake	W 91–56	4–5	31 – Calmese	8 – Pennebaker	6 – Pryor	Montagne Center (2,269); Beaumont, TX
December 10, 2022*; 2:00 pm, ESPN+		at Southern Miss	L 59–95	4–6	17 – Pryor	11 – Spencer	2 – Tied	Reed Green Coliseum (2,581); Hattiesburg, MS
December 13, 2022*; 7:00 pm, ESPN+		Southern Miss	L 65–91	4–7	22 – Calmese	10 – Yamanouchi	7 – Pryor	Montagne Center (1,161); Beaumont, TX
December 17, 2022*; 7:00 pm, ESPN+		at Louisiana–Monroe	L 59–83	4–8	14 – Yamanouchi	12 – Yamanouchi	4 – Calmese	Fant–Ewing Coliseum (978); Monroe, LA
December 20, 2022*; 7:00 pm, ESPN+		Pacific	L 65–74	4–9	23 – Hamilton	15 – Yamanouchi	3 – Calmese	Montagne Center (1,313); Beaumont, TX
Southland regular season
December 31, 2022; 4:00 pm, ESPN+		McNeese State; Battle of the Border	L 62–81	4–10 (0–1)	13 – Buckley	6 – Yamanouchi	4 – Buckley	Montagne Center (1,898); Beaumont, TX
January 5, 2023; 7:00 pm, ESPN+		at New Orleans	L 55–81	4–11 (0–2)	25 – Calmese	9 – Yamanouchi	6 – Pryor	Lakefront Arena (1,012); New Orleans, LA
January 7, 2023; 3:30 pm, ESPN+		at Southeastern	L 84–89 ^{OT}	4–12 (0–3)	23 – Calmese	19 – Yamanouchi	5 – Tied	University Center (378); Hammond, LA
January 12, 2023; 7:00 pm, ESPN+		Nicholls	W 69–66	5–12 (1–3)	20 – Calmese	10 – Pennebaker	6 – Pryor	Montagne Center (1,623); Beaumont, TX
January 14, 2023; 4:30 pm, ESPN+		at Texas A&M–Commerce	L 66–81	5–13 (1–4)	18 – Yamanouchi-Williams	11 – Yamanouchi-Williams	3 – Pryor	The Field House (376); Commerce, TX
January 19, 2023; 7:00 pm, ESPN+		Texas A&M–Corpus Christi	W 68–66	6–13 (2–4)	21 – Calmese	11 – Yamanouchi-Williams	4 – Buckley	Montagne Center (1,671); Beaumont, TX
January 21, 2023; 6:00 pm, ESPN+		Incarnate Word	L 64–70	6–14 (2–5)	16 – Calmese	9 – Yamanouchi-Williams	3 – Bulajic	Montagne Center (2,620); Beaumont, TX
January 26, 2023; 7:00 pm, ESPN+		Texas A&M–Commerce	L 57–62	6–15 (2–6)	17 – Calmese	8 – Buljic	4 – Buljic	Montagne Center (1,854); Beaumont, TX
January 28, 2023; 3:30 pm, ESPN+		at Northwestern State	L 65–80	6–16 (2–7)	20 – Calmese	7 – Thirdkill	4 – Pryor	Prather Coliseum (1,447); Natchitoches, LA
February 2, 2023; 7:30 pm, ESPN+		at McNeese State; Battle of the Border	W 70–63	7–16 (3–7)	20 – Calmese	11 – Tied	3 – Buckley	The Legacy Center (1,850); Lake Charles, LA
February 4, 2023; 6:00 pm, ESPN+		Northwestern State	L 68–72	7–17 (3–8)	20 – Pryor	8 – Thirdkill, Jr.	6 – Pryor	Montagne Center (1,953); Beaumont, TX
February 9, 2023; 7:30 pm, ESPN+		at Incarnate Word	W 68–59	8–17 (4–8)	27 – Calmese	12 – Yamanouchi	5 – Anderson	McDermott Center (320); San Antonio, TX
February 11, 2023; 3:30 pm, ESPN+		at Texas A&M–Corpus Christi	L 52–61	8–18 (4–9)	17 – Pryor	6 – Buckley	7 – Pryor	American Bank Center (1,644); Corpus Christi, TX
February 16, 2023; 7:00 pm, ESPN+		Houston Christian	W 91–75	9–18 (5–9)	32 – Calmese	8 – Anderson	7 – Pryor	Montagne Center (1,917); Beaumont, TX
February 18, 2023; 7:00 pm, ESPN+		at Houston Christian	L 74–93	9–19 (5–10)	23 – Calmese	7 – Thirdkill Jr.	3 – Tied	Sharp Gymnasium (1,000); Houston, TX
February 23, 2023; 7:00 pm, ESPN+		Southeastern Louisiana	L 60–83	9–20 (5–11)	13 – Calmese	7 – Yamanouchi-Williams	3 – Tied	Montagne Center (1,776); Beaumont, TX
February 25, 2023; 6:00 pm, ESPN+		New Orleans	L 79–84	9–21 (5–12)	23 – Calmese	9 – Thirdkill Jr.	2 – Tied	Montagne Center (1,988); Beaumont, TX
March 1, 2023; 7:00 pm, ESPN+		at Nicholls	L 60–64	9–22 (5–13)	19 – Calmese	6 – Tied	4 – Anderson	Stopher Gymnasium (543); Thibodaux, LA
*Non-conference game. ^{#}Rankings from AP Poll. (#) Tournament seedings in parentheses. All times are in Central Time.

== See also ==
2022–23 Lamar Lady Cardinals basketball team
