= 2023 Southland Conference men's basketball tournament =

- Classification: Division I
- Season: 2022–23
- Teams: 8
- Site: The Legacy Center; Lake Charles, Louisiana
- Champions: Texas A&M–Corpus Christi (3rd title)
- Winning coach: Steve Lutz (2nd title)
- MVP: Jalen Jackson (Texas A&M–Corpus Christi)
- Attendance: 6,626 (total); 813 (championship)
- Television: ESPN+, ESPNU, ESPN2

2022–23 Southland Conference men's basketball standings
	Conf.				Overall
Team	W		L	PCT	W		L	PCT
Texas A&M–Corpus Christi †	14	–	4	.778	24	–	11	.686
Northwestern State	13	–	5	.722	22	–	11	.667
Southeastern Louisiana	12	–	6	.667	18	–	14	.563
Nicholls	11	–	7	.611	16	–	15	.516
Texas A&M–Commerce*	9	–	9	.500	13	–	20	.394
Houston Christian	7	–	11	.389	10	–	22	.313
New Orleans	7	–	11	.389	12	–	20	.375
McNeese	6	–	12	.333	11	–	23	.324
Incarnate Word	6	–	12	.333	12	–	19	.387
Lamar	5	–	13	.278	9	–	22	.290
† 2023 Southland tournament winner * ineligible for the 2023 NCAA tournament due to transition period

The 2023 Southland Conference men's basketball tournament was the postseason men's basketball tournament for the 2022–23 season of the Southland Conference. The tournament was held March 5–8, 2023, at The Legacy Center in Lake Charles, Louisiana. Top seeded Texas A&M–Corpus Christi defeated second seeded Northwestern State 75–71 in the championship game winning its second consecutive tournament championship and receiving the conference's automatic invitation to the 2023 NCAA Division I men's basketball tournament.

== Seeds ==
McNeese clinched the final berth in the tournament on the final day of the regular season by overcoming a 22-point second-half deficit to earn 79–78 dramatic comeback victory over New Orleans. The McNeese win eliminated Incarnate Word, which controlled its own destiny but lost, 81–64, to Northwestern State.

Teams were seeded by record within the conference, with a tie–breaker system to seed teams with identical conference records. The top two seeds received double byes into the semifinals in the merit-based format. The No. 3 and No. 4 seeds received single byes to the quarterfinals. Tiebreakers used are, in general, 1) Head-to-head results, 2) comparison of records against individual teams in the conference starting with the top-ranked team(s) and working down, 3) road record in conference games, 4) comparison of road records against individual teams in the conference starting with the top-ranked team(s) and working down and 5) NCAA NET rankings available on day following the conclusion of regular-season play.

If a team that is not eligible for the NCAA Tournament wins the Southland Conference Tournament, the conference's automatic bid goes to the regular-season champion.

Seed	School	Conference	Tiebreaker 1	Tiebreaker 2
1	Texas A&M–Corpus Christi	14–4		
2	Northwestern State	13–5		
3	Southeastern Louisiana	12–6		
4	Nicholls	11–7		
5	Texas A&M–Commerce	9–9		
6	Houston Christian	7–11	1–1 vs. UNO	1–1 vs. AMCC
7	New Orleans	7–11	1–1 vs. HCU	0–2 vs. AMCC
8	McNeese	6–12	1–1 vs. UIW	1–1 vs. NWST
DNQ	Incarnate Word	6–12	1–1 vs. MCN	0–2 vs. NWST
DNQ	Lamar	5–13		

== Schedule ==
Session	Game	Time*	Matchup^{#}	Score	Television	Attendance
First round – Sunday March 5, 2023
1	1	5:00 pm	No. 5 Texas A&M–Commerce vs. No. 8 McNeese	78–79	ESPN+	2,572
1	2	7:30 pm	No. 6 Houston Christian vs. No. 7 New Orleans	69–90	ESPN+	1,059
Second round – Monday, March 6, 2023
2	3	5:00 pm	No. 4 Nicholls vs. No. 8 McNeese	71–77	ESPN+	976
2	4	7:30 pm	No. 3 Southeastern Louisiana vs. No. 7 New Orleans	78-82	ESPN+	976
Semifinals – Tuesday, March 7, 2023
3	5	5:30 pm	No. 1 Texas A&M-CC vs. No. 8 McNeese	80–63	ESPNU	1,206
3	6	8:00 pm	No. 2 Northwestern State vs. No. 7 New Orleans	74–70	ESPN+	1,206
Championship – Wednesday, March 8, 2023
4	7	4:00 pm	No. 1 Texas A&M-CC vs. No. 2 Northwestern State	75–71	ESPN2	813
*Game times in CDT. #-Rankings denote tournament seeding.

== Bracket ==
First round Sunday, March 5 ESPN+
5	Texas A&M-Commerce	78
8	McNeese State	79
6	Houston Christian	69
7	New Orleans	90

Second round Monday, March 6 ESPN+
4	Nicholls	71
8	McNeese State	77
3	Southeastern Louisiana	78
7	New Orleans	82

Semifinals; Tuesday, March 7 ESPN+/ESPNU
1	Texas A&M-CC	80
8	McNeese State	63
2	Northwestern State	74
7	New Orleans	70

Championship; Wednesday March 8 ESPN2
1	Texas A&M-CC	75
2	Northwestern State	71

* denotes number of overtime periods

== Awards and honors ==
2023 Southland Conference Men's Basketball All-Tournament Team
- Jalen Jackson, Texas A&M–Corpus Christi (MVP)
- Tervian Tennyson, Texas A&M–Corpus Christi
- Demarcus Sharp, Northwestern State
- Jalen Hampton, Northwestern State
- Christian Shumate, McNeese

== See also ==
- 2023 Southland Conference women's basketball tournament
- Southland Conference men's basketball tournament
