= 2022–23 Texas A&M–Commerce Lions men's basketball team =

American college basketball season

2022–23 Texas A&M–Commerce Lions men's basketball
- Conference: Southland Conference
- Record: 13–20 (9–9 Southland)
- Head coach: Jaret von Rosenberg (6th season)
- Assistant coaches: Coleman Furst; Ted Rawlings; Willie Rooks
- Home arena: Texas A&M–Commerce Field House

2022–23 Southland Conference men's basketball standings
	Conf.				Overall
Team	W		L	PCT	W		L	PCT
Texas A&M–Corpus Christi †	14	–	4	.778	24	–	11	.686
Northwestern State	13	–	5	.722	22	–	11	.667
Southeastern Louisiana	12	–	6	.667	18	–	14	.563
Nicholls	11	–	7	.611	16	–	15	.516
Texas A&M–Commerce*	9	–	9	.500	13	–	20	.394
Houston Christian	7	–	11	.389	10	–	22	.313
New Orleans	7	–	11	.389	12	–	20	.375
McNeese	6	–	12	.333	11	–	23	.324
Incarnate Word	6	–	12	.333	12	–	19	.387
Lamar	5	–	13	.278	9	–	22	.290
† 2023 Southland tournament winner * ineligible for the 2023 NCAA tournament due to transition period

The 2022–23 Texas A&M–Commerce Lions men's basketball team represented the Texas A&M University–Commerce in the 2022–23 NCAA Division I men's basketball season. The Lions, led by fifth-year head coach Jaret von Rosenberg, played their home games at Texas A&M–Commerce Field House in Commerce, Texas as members of the Southland Conference.

This season marks Texas A&M–Commerce's first year of a four-year transition period from Division II to Division I. As a result, the Lions will not be eligible for NCAA postseason play until the 2026–27 season.

== Previous season ==
The Texas A&M–Commerce Lions finished the 2021–22 NCAA Division II men's basketball season 17–9, 9–5 in Lone Star Conference play, to finish in fourth place in conference. The Lions were defeated by Texas A&M–Kingsville in the first round of the 2022 Lone Star Conference men's basketball tournament. They were invited to the 2022 NCAA Division II men's basketball tournament. Their season ended in the tournament's South Central Regional first round with a defeat to first-seeded Lubbock Christian University.

== Preseason polls ==
=== Southland Conference poll ===
The Southland Conference released its preseason poll on October 25, 2022. Receiving 56 votes overall, the Lions were picked to finish seventh in the conference.

Predicted finish	Team	Votes (1st place)
1	Texas A&M–Corpus Christi	149 (11)
2	Nicholls	137 (6)
3	New Orleans	129 (2)
4	Southeastern	105
5	McNeese	97
6	Northwestern State	92
7	Texas A&M–Commerce	56
8	Houston Christian	55 (1)
9	Lamar	44
10	Incarnate Word	36

=== Preseason all-conference ===
No Lions were selected as members of a preseason all-conference team.

== Roster ==
2022–23 Texas A&M-Commerce Lions men's basketball team
Players
Coaches

Pos.	#	Name	Height	Weight	Year	Hometown
F	0	JJ Romer Rosario	6 ft 9 in (2.06 m)	205 lb (93 kg)	Sr	Hialeah Gardens, FL
G	1	Monyae Davis	6 ft 3 in (1.91 m)	170 lb (77 kg)	So	Fort Worth, TX
G	2	Kalen Williams	6 ft 2 in (1.88 m)	175 lb (79 kg)	Jr	Hephzibah, GA
G	3	Tommie Lewis	6 ft 0 in (1.83 m)	180 lb (82 kg)	Jr	Vero Beach, FL
G	4	Demarcus Demonia	6 ft 7 in (2.01 m)	195 lb (88 kg)	Sr	Fort Washington, MD
G	5	Ant Abraham	6 ft 1 in (1.85 m)	175 lb (79 kg)	So	Mount Vernon, NY
G	10	Alonzo Dodd	6 ft 1 in (1.85 m)	168 lb (76 kg)	Fr	Saint Paul, MN
G	11	Khaliq Abdul-Mateen	6 ft 1 in (1.85 m)	186 lb (84 kg)	So	Houston, TX
G	12	Matt Lewis	6 ft 2 in (1.88 m)	185 lb (84 kg)	Fr	Houston, TX
F	21	Rob Banks	6 ft 5 in (1.96 m)	205 lb (93 kg)	RS So	Bracknell, England
F	23	Alex Peavy	6 ft 9 in (2.06 m)	220 lb (100 kg)	Sr	San Antonio, TX
F	24	Jerome Jr. Brewer	6 ft 9 in (2.06 m)	216 lb (98 kg)	Fr	Camden, NJ
G	25	Anariss Brandon	6 ft 2 in (1.88 m)	175 lb (79 kg)	Fr	Converse, TX
G	30	C.J. Roberts	6 ft 1 in (1.85 m)	185 lb (84 kg)	Sr	Irving, TX
F	35	Luka Vasic	6 ft 8 in (2.03 m)	205 lb (93 kg)	Sr	Pirot, Serbia

Head coach

- Jaret von Rosenberg (Hartford)

Assistant coach(es)

- Coleman Furst (Tarleton State)
- Ted Rawlings (Penn)
- Yolonzo Moore (Hartford)

Legend

- (C) Team captain
- (S) Suspended
- (I) Ineligible
- (W) Walk-on
- Injured
- Current redshirt

Roster
Last update: November 1, 2022

== Schedule and results ==
Date time, TV	Rank^{#}	Opponent^{#}	Result	Record	Site (attendance) city, state
Exhibition season
November 2, 2022*; 8:00 p.m.		Science and Arts	W 73–64		The Field House (321); Commerce, TX
Non-conference season
November 7, 2022*; 7:30 p.m., ESPN+		at SMU	L 60–77	0–1	Moody Coliseum (3,276); Dallas, TX
November 11, 2022*; 7:00 p.m., ESPN+		at Northern Colorado	L 77–80	0–2	Bank of Colorado Arena (1,319); Greeley, CO
November 14, 2022*; 8:00 p.m.		at Air Force	W 73–69 ^{OT}	1–2	Clune Arena (1,131); Colorado Springs, CO
November 18, 2022*; 7:30 p.m., ESPN+		vs. UNC Asheville; Capitol Classic	L 64–72	1–3	Georgia State Convocation Center (630); Atlanta, GA
November 19, 2022*; 2:00 p.m., ESPN+		at Georgia State; Capitol Classic	L 53–57	1–4	Georgia State Convocation Center (1,198); Atlanta, GA
November 20, 2022*; 12:00 p.m., ESPN+		vs. Eastern Kentucky; Capitol Classic	W 75–61	2–4	Georgia State Convocation Center (588); Atlanta, GA
November 28, 2022*; 6:00 p.m., ESPN+		Arlington Baptist	W 101–46	3–4	The Field House (461); Commerce, TX
November 30, 2022*; 11:00 p.m., ESPN+		at Hawaii	W 53–51	4–4	Stan Sheriff Center (3,948); Honolulu, HI
December 4, 2022*; 3:00 p.m.		at Denver	L 75–84	4–5	Hamilton Gymnasium (1,191); Denver, CO
December 6, 2022*; 8:00 p.m.		at Wyoming	L 76–91	4–6	Arena-Auditorium (3,953); Laramie, WY
December 10, 2022*; 2:00 p.m., ESPN+		at Abilene Christian	L 64–83	4–7	Moody Coliseum (1,204); Abilene, TX
December 19, 2022*; 6:00 p.m., ESPN+		at Purdue Fort Wayne; Indiana Classic	L 68–85	4–8	Allen County War Memorial Coliseum (1,840); Fort Wayne, IN
December 20, 2022*; 3:00 p.m., ESPN+		vs. IUPUI; Indiana Classic	L 52–62	4–9	Allen County War Memorial Coliseum (143); Fort Wayne, IN
December 27, 2022*; 7:00 p.m., LHN		at No. 6 Texas	L 72–97	4–10	Moody Center (10,763); Austin, TX
Southland Conference season
December 31, 2022; 4:30 p.m., ESPN+		Incarnate Word	W 82–74 ^{OT}	5–10 (1–0)	The Field House (245); Commerce, TX
January 5, 2023; 8:00 p.m., ESPN+		Nicholls	L 63–66	5–11 (1–1)	The Field House (246); Commerce, TX
January 7, 2023; 3:30 p.m., ESPN+		at McNeese	W 82–80 ^{OT}	6–11 (2–1)	The Legacy Center (2,096); Lake Charles, LA
January 12, 2023; 7:00 p.m., ESPN+		at Houston Christian	L 59–68	6–12 (2–2)	Sharp Gymnasium; Houston, TX
January 14, 2023; 4:30 p.m., ESPN+		Lamar	W 81–66	7–12 (3–2)	The Field House (376); Commerce, TX
January 19, 2023; 7:00 p.m., ESPN+		at New Orleans	W 63-58	8-12 (4-2)	Lakefront Arena (827); New Orleans, LA
January 21, 2023; 3:30 p.m., ESPN+		at Southeastern Louisiana	L 73–79	8–13 (4–3)	University Center (912); Hammond, LA
January 26, 2023; 7:00 p.m., ESPN+		at Lamar	W 62–57	9–13 (5–3)	Montagne Center (1,854); Beaumont, TX
January 28, 2023; 4:30 p.m., ESPN+		Houston Christian	W 77–76	10–13 (6–3)	The Field House (403); Commerce, TX
February 2, 2023; 7:00 p.m.		at Nicholls	Game postponed to February 20 due to icy weather conditions in Texas		Stopher Gymnasium; Thibodaux, LA
February 4, 2023; 4:30 p.m., ESPN+		McNeese	W 60–58	11–13 (7–3)	The Field House (311); Commerce, TX
February 9, 2023; 8:00 p.m., ESPN+		Northwestern State	L 82–88	11–14 (7–4)	The Field House (427); Commerce, TX
February 11, 2023; 3:30 p.m., ESPN+		at Northwestern State	L 64–72	11–15 (7–5)	Prather Coliseum (1,512); Natchitoches, LA
February 16, 2023; 8:00 p.m., ESPN+		New Orleans	L 78–84	11–16 (7–6)	The Field House (251); Commerce, TX
February 18, 2023; 4:30 p.m., ESPN+		Southeastern Louisiana	L 76–78 ^{OT}	11–17 (7–7)	The Field House (521); Commerce, TX
February 20, 2023; 7:00 p.m., ESPN+		at Nicholls	W 72–71	12–17 (8–7)	Stopher Gymnasium (611); Thibodaux, LA
February 23, 2023; 7:30 p.m., ESPN+		at Texas A&M–Corpus Christi	W 84–80	13–17 (9–7)	American Bank Center (1,634); Corpus Christi, TX
February 25, 2023; 4:00 p.m., ESPN+		at Incarnate Word	L 75–79	13–18 (9–8)	McDermott Center; San Antonio, TX
Mar 1, 2023; 8:00 p.m., ESPN+		Texas A&M–Corpus Christi	L 88–93 ^{OT}	13–19 (9–9)	The Field House (631); Commerce, TX
Southland tournament
March 5, 2023; 1:00 p.m., ESPN+	(5)	at (8) McNeese; First round	L 78–79	13–20	The Legacy Center (2,572); Lake Charles, LA
*Non-conference game. ^{#}Rankings from AP poll. (#) Tournament seedings in parentheses. All times are in Central.

== See also ==
- 2022–23 Texas A&M–Commerce Lions women's basketball team
