= 2023–24 UAB Blazers men's basketball team =

American college basketball season

2023–24 UAB Blazers men's basketball

AAC tournament champions

NCAA tournament, First Round
- Conference: American Athletic Conference
- Record: 23–12 (12–6 AAC)
- Head coach: Andy Kennedy (4th season)
- Associate head coach: Ryan Cross
- Assistant coaches: Philip Pearson; Rob Williams
- Home arena: Bartow Arena

2023–24 American Athletic Conference men's basketball standings
	Conf.				Overall
Team	W		L	PCT	W		L	PCT
South Florida	16	–	2	.889	25	–	8	.758
Florida Atlantic	14	–	4	.778	25	–	9	.735
Charlotte	13	–	5	.722	19	–	12	.613
UAB †	12	–	6	.667	23	–	12	.657
Memphis	11	–	7	.611	22	–	10	.688
SMU	11	–	7	.611	20	–	13	.606
North Texas	10	–	8	.556	19	–	15	.559
East Carolina	7	–	11	.389	15	–	18	.455
Tulsa	7	–	11	.389	16	–	15	.516
Tulane	5	–	13	.278	14	–	17	.452
Temple	5	–	13	.278	16	–	20	.444
Wichita State	5	–	13	.278	15	–	19	.441
Rice	5	–	13	.278	11	–	21	.344
UTSA	5	–	13	.278	11	–	21	.344
† 2024 AAC tournament winner

The 2023–24 UAB Blazers men's basketball team represented the University of Alabama at Birmingham during the 2023–24 NCAA Division I men's basketball season. The team was led by fourth-year head coach Andy Kennedy, and played their home games at the Bartow Arena in Birmingham, Alabama as first-year members of American Athletic Conference (AAC).

== Previous season ==
The Blazers finished the 2022–23 season 29–10, 14–6 in Conference USA (C-USA) play to finish in third place. They defeated Rice in the quarterfinals and North Texas in the semifinals, before losing in the championship of the C-USA tournament to Florida Atlantic. They received an at-large bid to the NIT, where they defeated Southern Miss in the first round, Morehead State in the second round, Vanderbilt in the quarterfinals and Utah Valley in the semifinals, before losing to North Texas in the championship game.

The season marked the team's last season as members of Conference USA before joining the American Athletic Conference on July 1, 2023.

== Offseason ==
=== Departures ===
Name	Number	Pos.	Height	Weight	Year	Hometown	Reason for departure
Ledarrius Brewer	2	G	6'5"	190	RS Senior	Meridian, MS	Graduated
Tavin Lovan	3	G	6'4"	210	Senior	Franklin, KY	Graduated
KJ Buffen	5	F	6'7"	230	Senior	Gainesville, GA	Graduated
Jordan Walker	10	G	5'11"	170	RS Senior	Port Washington, NY	Graduated/undrafted in 2023 NBA draft; signed with the Dallas Mavericks
Ty Brewer	15	F	6'7"	200	Senior	Meridian, MS	Graduated
Tyler Bertram	23	G	6'3"	170	RS Junior	Cooperstown, NY	Transferred to Albany
Rongie Gordon	25	F	6'8"	225	Sophomore	Montgomery, AL	Transferred to Kennesaw State
Trey Jemison	55	C	6'11"	260	Senior	Birmingham, AL	Graduated/undrafted in 2023 NBA draft; signed with the New Orleans Pelicans

=== Incoming transfers ===
Name	Number	Pos.	Height	Weight	Year	Hometown	Previous school
Daniel Oritz	2	G	6'0"	187	Junior	Shreveport, LA	North Alabama
Yaxel Lendeborg	3	F	6'9"	230	Junior	Pennsauken, NJ	Arizona Western College
James White	5	G	6'5"	190	Junior	Conyers, GA	Ole Miss
Alejandro Vasquez	10	G	6'4"	205	Junior	Queens, NY	Salt Lake CC
Christian Coleman	13	F	6'9"		Junior	Winnsboro, LA	South Plains College
Marquis Hargrove	15	G	6'3"	180	Junior	Sacramento, CA	Arizona Western College
Barry Dunning	22	G	6'6"	195	Sophomore	Mobile, AL	Arkansas
Will Shaver	25	F	6'10"	260	RS Sophomore	Birmingham, AL	North Carolina

=== Recruiting classes ===
==== 2023 recruiting class ====
College recruiting
Name	Hometown	School	Height	Weight	Commit date
KJ Satterfield; SG	Columbus, OH	Whitehall Yearling High School	6 ft 4 in (1.93 m)	180 lb (82 kg)	Mar 17, 2022
KJ Satterfield; SG	Recruit ratings: 247Sports:				
Overall recruit ranking:
Note: In many cases, Scout, Rivals, 247Sports, On3, and ESPN may conflict in their listings of height and weight.; In these cases, the average was taken. ESPN grades are on a 100-point scale.; Sources: "2023 Team Ranking". Rivals.

== Roster ==
2023–24 UAB Blazers men's basketball team
Players
Coaches

Pos.	#	Name	Height	Weight	Year	Previous school	Hometown
F	0	Javian Davis	6 ft 9 in (2.06 m)	265 lb (120 kg)	RS Sr	Mississippi State	Canton, MS
G	2	Daniel Ortiz	6 ft 0 in (1.83 m)	185 lb (84 kg)	Jr	North Alabama	Shreveport, LA
F	3	Yaxel Lendeborg	6 ft 9 in (2.06 m)	230 lb (104 kg)	Jr	Arizona Western College	Pennsauken, NJ
G	4	Eric Gaines	6 ft 2 in (1.88 m)	165 lb (75 kg)	Jr	LSU	Lithonia, GA
G	5	James White	6 ft 5 in (1.96 m)	190 lb (86 kg)	Jr	Ole Miss	Conyers, GA
G	10	Alejandro Vasquez	6 ft 4 in (1.93 m)	205 lb (93 kg)	Jr	Salt Lake Community College	Queens, NY
G	11	KJ Satterfield	6 ft 4 in (1.93 m)	180 lb (82 kg)	Fr	The Patrick School	The Bronx, NY
G	12	Tony Toney	6 ft 2 in (1.88 m)	190 lb (86 kg)	Jr	Mae Jemison High School	Huntsville, AL
F	13	Christian Coleman	6 ft 9 in (2.06 m)	200 lb (91 kg)	Jr	South Plains College	Winnsboro, LA
G	15	Marquis Hargrove	6 ft 3 in (1.91 m)	180 lb (82 kg)	Jr	Arizona Western College	Sacramento, CA
G	21	Jon Coleman (W)	5 ft 10 in (1.78 m)	165 lb (75 kg)	Sr	Hall High School	Little Rock, AR
G	22	Barry Jr. Dunning	6 ft 6 in (1.98 m)	195 lb (88 kg)	So	Arkansas	Mobile, AL
F	23	Seth Sigmon (W)	6 ft 3 in (1.91 m)	205 lb (93 kg)	Sr	Huntsville High School	Houston, TX
G	24	Efrem "Butta" Johnson	6 ft 4 in (1.93 m)	180 lb (82 kg)	So	Grissom High School	Huntsville, AL
F	25	Will Shaver	6 ft 10 in (2.08 m)	270 lb (122 kg)	RS So	North Carolina	Birmingham, AL
G	30	Ryan Donohoo (W)	6 ft 0 in (1.83 m)	180 lb (82 kg)	Jr	Briarwood Christian School	Birmingham, AL

Head coach

- Andy Kennedy (UAB)

Assistant coach(es)

- Ryan Cross (Buffalo)
- Philip Pearson (Alabama)
- Rob Williams (UAB)

Legend

- (C) Team captain
- (S) Suspended
- (I) Ineligible
- (W) Walk-on
- Injured
- Current redshirt

Roster
Last update: December 10, 2023

== Schedule and results ==
Date time, TV	Rank^{#}	Opponent^{#}	Result	Record	High points	High rebounds	High assists	Site (attendance) city, state
Exhibition
October 30, 2023*; 7:00 p.m., −		Morehouse	W 88–70	−	13 – Gaines	12 – Lendeborg	3 – Gaines	Bartow Arena (2,317); Birmingham, AL
Non-conference regular season
November 6, 2023*; 7:00 p.m., ESPN+		Bradley	L 71–73 ^{OT}	0–1	20 – Davis	15 – Davis	2 – Lendeborg	Bartow Arena (3,632); Birmingham, AL
November 10, 2023*; 8:30 p.m., ESPN+		vs. Clemson; Asheville Championship semifinals	L 76–77	0–2	18 – Gaines	6 – tied	3 – tied	Harrah's Cherokee Center (3,319); Asheville, NC
November 12, 2023*; 11:30 a.m., ESPN2		vs. Maryland; Asheville Championship consolation	W 66–63	1–2	20 – Gaines	7 – Davis	3 – Gaines	Harrah's Cherokee Center (1,507); Asheville, NC
November 16, 2023*; 7:00 p.m., ESPN+		Alcorn State	W 80–77	2–2	25 – Vasquez	9 – Davis	2 – tied	Bartow Arena (3,184); Birmingham, AL
November 21, 2023*; 6:30 p.m., ESPN+		at Middle Tennessee	W 58–57	3–2	21 – Davis	12 – Lendeborg	3 – Vasquez	Murphy Center (3,227); Murfreesboro, TN
November 25, 2023*; 5:00 p.m., ESPN+		Furman	W 92–86	4–2	19 – Lendeborg	10 – Lendeborg	6 – Gaines	Bartow Arena (2,953); Birmingham, AL
November 28, 2023*; 7:00 p.m., ESPN+		McNeese	L 60–81	4–3	20 – Ortiz	11 – Davis	3 – Gaines	Bartow Arena (2,976); Birmingham, AL
December 1, 2023*; 7:00 p.m., ESPN+		Southern Miss	L 82–85	4–4	26 – Vasquez	7 – Lendeborg	6 – Gaines	Bartow Arena (3,337); Birmingham, AL
December 9, 2023*; 2:30 p.m., ESPN+		at Arkansas State	L 68–87	4–5	17 – Lendeborg	10 – Lendeborg	5 – tied	First National Bank Arena (2,699); Jonesboro, AR
December 13, 2023*; 7:00 p.m., −		at Alabama A&M	W 93–82	5–5	16 – Lendeborg	16 – Lendeborg	8 – Gaines	Alabama A&M Events Center (2,893); Huntsville, AL
December 17, 2023*; 2:00 p.m., ESPN+		Montevallo	W 92–56	6–5	22 – Davis	8 – Coleman	10 – Gaines	Bartow Arena (3,576); Birmingham, AL
December 22, 2023*; 2:00 p.m., ESPN+		Drake	W 79–78 ^{OT}	7–5	15 – Davis	8 – Lendeborg	9 – Gaines	Bartow Arena (3,496); Birmingham, AL
December 29, 2023*; 7:00 p.m., ESPN+		UNC Asheville	W 90–85	8–5	24 – Lendeborg	15 – Lendeborg	7 – Gaines	Bartow Arena (3,392); Birmingham, AL
AAC regular season
January 2, 2024; 8:00 p.m., ESPNU		at UTSA	W 78–76	9–5 (1–0)	23 – Lendeborg	15 – Lendeborg	6 – Gaines	Convocation Center (744); San Antonio, TX
January 7, 2024; 2:00 p.m., ESPN+		South Florida	W 75–71	10–5 (2–0)	23 – Lendeborg	15 – Lendeborg	3 – Johnson	Bartow Arena (3,677); Birmingham, AL
January 14, 2024; 11:00 a.m., ESPN+		at No. 24 Florida Atlantic	L 73–86	10–6 (2–1)	13 – tied	7 – Davis	4 – Lendeborg	Eleanor R. Baldwin Arena (3,161); Boca Raton, FL
January 17, 2024; 7:00 p.m., ESPN+		Tulane	W 83–69	11–6 (3–1)	28 – Vasquez	18 – Lendeborg	6 – Johnson	Bartow Arena (3,472); Birmingham, AL
January 20, 2024; 2:00 p.m., ESPN+		East Carolina	W 69–61	12–6 (4–1)	17 – Gaines	9 – Davis	8 – Gaines	Bartow Arena (3,872); Birmingham, AL
January 23, 2024; 6:00 p.m., ESPN+		at Charlotte	L 70–76	12–7 (4–2)	13 – Vasquez	5 – tied	4 – Gaines	Dale F. Halton Arena (4,155); Charlotte, NC
January 28, 2024; 4:00 p.m., ESPN		No. 19 Memphis; Battle for the Bones	W 97–88	13–7 (5–2)	23 – Lendeborg	16 – Lendeborg	4 – tied	Bartow Arena (8,127); Birmingham, AL
January 31, 2024; 8:00 p.m., ESPNU		at North Texas	W 82–79 ^{OT}	14–7 (6–2)	18 – Johnson	10 – Lendeborg	5 – Gaines	The Super Pit (3,689); Denton, TX
February 4, 2024; 5:00 p.m., ESPN2		at SMU	L 69–72	14–8 (6–3)	20 – Johnson	13 – Lendeborg	10 – Gaines	Moody Coliseum (5,656); Dallas, TX
February 8, 2024; 8:00 p.m., ESPN2		No. 20 Florida Atlantic	W 76–73 ^{OT}	15–8 (7–3)	17 – Lendeborg	21 – Lendeborg	8 – Gaines	Bartow Arena (5,306); Birmingham, AL
February 11, 2024; 1:00 p.m., ESPN+		at Tulsa	W 70–63	16–8 (8–3)	17 – tied	11 – tied	7 – Gaines	Reynolds Center (3,124); Tulsa, OK
February 18, 2024; 2:00 p.m., ESPN+		North Texas	W 71–62	17–8 (9–3)	26 – Lendeborg	8 – tied	4 – Gaines	Bartow Arena (4,785); Birmingham, AL
February 21, 2024; 7:00 p.m., ESPN+		Rice	L 71–94	17–9 (9–4)	16 – Lendeborg	11 – Lendeborg	5 – Gaines	Bartow Arena (3,751); Birmingham, AL
February 25, 2024; 3:00 p.m., ESPN2		at Tulane	W 78–67	18–9 (10–4)	26 – Lendeborg	12 – Lendeborg	5 – tied	Devlin Fieldhouse (1,605); New Orleans, LA
February 28, 2024; 7:00 p.m., ESPN+		Wichita State	L 66–74	18–10 (10–5)	22 – Vasquez	15 – Lendeborg	5 – Gaines	Bartow Arena (4,487); Birmingham, AL
March 3, 2024; 4:30 p.m., ESPN2		at Memphis; Battle for the Bones	L 87–106	18–11 (10–6)	17 – Gaines	8 – Lendeborg	8 – Gaines	FedExForum (13,491); Memphis, TN
March 7, 2024; 6:00 p.m., ESPN2		at Temple	W 100–72	19–11 (11–6)	19 – tied	14 – Lendeborg	10 – Gaines	Liacouras Center (2,515); Philadelphia, PA
March 10, 2024; 2:00 p.m., ESPN+		SMU	W 74–70	20–11 (12–6)	22 – Gaines	12 – Lendeborg	3 – Gaines	Bartow Arena (4,037); Birmingham, AL
AAC tournament
March 15, 2024; 2:00 p.m., ESPN2	(4)	vs. (12) Wichita State; Quarterfinals	W 72–60	21–11	18 – Lendeborg	14 – Lendeborg	7 – Gaines	Dickies Arena (5,454); Fort Worth, TX
March 16, 2024; 2:00 p.m., ESPN2	(4)	vs. (1) South Florida; Semifinals	W 93–83	22–11	21 – Johnson	11 – Lendeborg	5 – Gaines	Dickies Arena (5,545); Fort Worth, TX
March 17, 2024; 2:15 p.m., ESPN	(4)	vs. (11) Temple; Championship	W 85–69	23–11	29 – Vasquez	16 – Lendeborg	9 – Gaines	Dickies Arena (5,695); Fort Worth, TX
NCAA tournament
March 22, 2024; 12:45 p.m., TNT	(12 E)	vs. (5 E) No. 24 San Diego State; First round	L 65–69	23–12	19 – Johnson	7 – Lendeborg	3 – Gaines	Spokane Veterans Memorial Arena; Spokane, WA
*Non-conference game. ^{#}Rankings from AP poll. (#) Tournament seedings in parentheses. All times are in Central.
