= 2023–24 Tulane Green Wave men's basketball team =

American college basketball season

2023–24 Tulane Green Wave men's basketball
- Conference: American Athletic Conference
- Record: 14–17 (5–13 AAC)
- Head coach: Ron Hunter (5th season)
- Associate head coach: Ray McCallum
- Assistant coaches: Claude Pardue; Sean Mock; Darryl LaBarrie
- Home arena: Devlin Fieldhouse

2023–24 American Athletic Conference men's basketball standings
	Conf.				Overall
Team	W		L	PCT	W		L	PCT
South Florida	16	–	2	.889	25	–	8	.758
Florida Atlantic	14	–	4	.778	25	–	9	.735
Charlotte	13	–	5	.722	19	–	12	.613
UAB †	12	–	6	.667	23	–	12	.657
Memphis	11	–	7	.611	22	–	10	.688
SMU	11	–	7	.611	20	–	13	.606
North Texas	10	–	8	.556	19	–	15	.559
East Carolina	7	–	11	.389	15	–	18	.455
Tulsa	7	–	11	.389	16	–	15	.516
Tulane	5	–	13	.278	14	–	17	.452
Temple	5	–	13	.278	16	–	20	.444
Wichita State	5	–	13	.278	15	–	19	.441
Rice	5	–	13	.278	11	–	21	.344
UTSA	5	–	13	.278	11	–	21	.344
† 2024 AAC tournament winner

The 2023–24 Tulane Green Wave men's basketball team represented Tulane University during the 2023–24 NCAA Division I men's basketball season. The Green Wave, led by fifth-year head coach Ron Hunter, played their home games at Devlin Fieldhouse in New Orleans, Louisiana as members of the American Athletic Conference.

== Previous season ==
The Green Wave went 20–11, and 12–6 in AAC Play to finish in 3rd place. They defeated Wichita State in the quarterfinals of the AAC tournament before losing in the semifinals to Memphis.

== Offseason ==
=== Departures ===
Name	Number	Pos.	Height	Weight	Year	Hometown	Reason for departure
Braelee Albert	0	G/F	6'5"	220	Junior	Los Angeles, CA	Walk-on; transferred
Jadan Coleman	2	G	6'4"	170	Sophomore	Madison, AL	Transferred to Detroit Mercy
Jalen Cook	3	G	6'0"	205	Sophomore	Walker, LA	Transferred to LSU
Nobal Days	4	F	6'9"	220	Junior	Racine, WI	Transferred to Charleston Southern
Oton Jankovic	10	F	6'10"	215	Junior	Zagreb, Croatia	Transferred to Detroit Mercy
Quentin Scott	15	F	6'7"	215	GS Senior	Houma, LA	Graduated
R. J. McGee	23	G	6'5"	200	Junior	Chicago, IL	Transferred to Southern Illinois
Tylan Pope	33	F	6'6"	220	RS Sophomore	Franklinton, LA	Transferred to Nevada

=== Incoming transfers ===
Name	Num	Pos.	Height	Weight	Year	Hometown	Previous School
Logan Stephens	0	G	6'2"	197	Junior	Decatur, GA	Rutgers
Gregg Glenn III	2	F	6'7"	230	Sophomore	Fort Lauderdale, FL	Michigan
Jordan Wood	11	F	6'9"	205	Senior	San Antonio, TX	Howard
Kolby King	12	G	6'2"	175	Sophomore	Pembroke Pines, FL	St. John's
Asher Woods	22	G	6'3"	180	Sophomore	Newnan, GA	VMI

=== 2023 recruiting class ===
College recruiting information
Name	Hometown	School	Height	Weight	Commit date
Spencer Elliott; C	Atlanta, GA	St. Pius X High School	6 ft 9 in (2.06 m)	205 lb (93 kg)	Aug 4, 2022
Spencer Elliott; C	Recruit ratings: Scout: Rivals: 247Sports: ESPN: (0)				
Mier Panoam; PG	Norcross, GA	Norcross High School	6 ft 2 in (1.88 m)	185 lb (84 kg)	Apr 29, 2023
Mier Panoam; PG	Recruit ratings: Scout: Rivals: 247Sports: ESPN: (0)				
Overall recruit ranking:
Note: In many cases, Scout, Rivals, 247Sports, On3, and ESPN may conflict in their listings of height and weight.; In these cases, the average was taken. ESPN grades are on a 100-point scale.; Sources: "2023 Team Ranking". Rivals.

== Roster ==
2023–24 Tulane Green Wave men's basketball team
Players
Coaches

Pos.	#	Name	Height	Weight	Year	Previous school	Hometown
G	0	Logan Stephens	6 ft 2 in (1.88 m)	197 lb (89 kg)	Jr	Woodward Academy; Rutgers	Decatur, GA
G	1	Sion James	6 ft 5 in (1.96 m)	205 lb (93 kg)	Jr	Lanier	Sugar Hill, GA
F	2	Gregg Glenn	6 ft 7 in (2.01 m)	230 lb (104 kg)	So	Calvary Christian Academy; Michigan	Fort Lauderdale, FL
G	3	Mier Panoam	6 ft 3 in (1.91 m)	185 lb (84 kg)	Fr	Norcross	Anchorage, AK
C	4	Spencer Elliott	6 ft 9 in (2.06 m)	210 lb (95 kg)	Fr	St. Pius Catholic	Atlanta, GA
F	5	Collin Holloway	6 ft 6 in (1.98 m)	220 lb (100 kg)	Jr	Port Allen; Georgetown	Baton Rouge, LA
F	11	Jordan Wood	6 ft 9 in (2.06 m)	205 lb (93 kg)	Sr	Cornerstone Christian; Howard	San Antonio, TX
G	12	Kolby King	6 ft 2 in (1.88 m)	175 lb (79 kg)	So	Pembroke Pines Charter; St. John's	Pembroke Pines, FL
G	13	Tre' Williams	6 ft 6 in (1.98 m)	200 lb (91 kg)	Sr	Wasatch Academy; Oregon State	Dallas, TX
G	14	Max Bowman (W)	6 ft 0 in (1.83 m)	175 lb (79 kg)	Jr	JSerra Catholic	Newport Beach, CA
G	22	Asher Woods	6 ft 3 in (1.91 m)	180 lb (82 kg)	So	Parkview	Newman, GA
C	23	Percy Daniels	6 ft 9 in (2.06 m)	235 lb (107 kg)	So	Madison Prep Academy	Baton Rouge, LA
F	24	Kevin Cross Jr.	6 ft 8 in (2.03 m)	240 lb (109 kg)	Sr	Mills HS; Nebraska	Little Rock, AR
G	25	Jaylen Forbes	6 ft 5 in (1.96 m)	185 lb (84 kg)	Sr	Florence; Alabama	Florence, MS
G	34	Jake Shapiro (W)	6 ft 1 in (1.85 m)	175 lb (79 kg)	So	Windward School	Los Angeles, CA

Head coach

- Ron Hunter (Miami (OH))

Assistant coach(es)

- Ray McCallum (Ball State)
- Claude Pardue (Emory)
- Sean Mock (Miami (OH))
- Darryl LaBarrie (Georgia Tech)

Legend

- (C) Team captain
- (S) Suspended
- (I) Ineligible
- (W) Walk-on
- Injured
- Current redshirt

Roster

== Schedule and results ==
Date time, TV	Rank^{#}	Opponent^{#}	Result	Record	High points	High rebounds	High assists	Site (attendance) city, state
Exhibition
October 26, 2023*; 6:00 p.m.		Mississippi College	W 83–72	–	18 – Forbes	8 – Glenn III	6 – King	Devlin Fieldhouse (811); New Orleans, LA
November 2, 2023*; 6:00 p.m.		Henderson State	W 85–64	–	17 – Davis	7 – Patterson	4 – Farmer	Devlin Fieldhouse (844); New Orleans, LA
Non-conference regular season
November 6, 2023*; 8:00 p.m., ESPN+		Nicholls	W 91–81	1–0	22 – King	14 – Cross	5 – Cross	Devlin Fieldhouse (1,689); New Orleans, LA
November 9, 2023*; 6:00 p.m., ESPN+		Northwestern State	W 88–71	2–0	23 – Cross	9 – Glenn III	6 – Cross	Devlin Fieldhouse (–); New Orleans, LA
November 17, 2023*; 6:00 p.m., ESPN+		Sacramento State; SoCal Challenge campus site game	W 92–57	3–0	21 – James	4 – Tied	4 – Forbes	Devlin Fieldhouse (1,231); New Orleans, LA
November 20, 2023*; 9:30 p.m., CBSSN		vs. Bradley; SoCal Challenge Surf Division semifinals	L 77–80	3–1	17 – Forbes	8 – Cross	3 – Tied	The Pavilion at JSerra (498); San Juan Capistrano, CA
November 22, 2023*; 11:30 p.m., CBSSN		vs. California; SoCal Challenge Surf Division 3rd place game	W 84–81	4–1	24 – Cross	9 – Cross	2 – Tied	The Pavilion at JSerra (312); San Juan Capistrano, CA
November 29, 2023*; 6:00 p.m., ESPN+		Prairie View A&M	W 98–77	5–1	21 – Cross	8 – King	8 – King	Devlin Fieldhouse (1,227); New Orleans, LA
December 3, 2023*; 11:00 a.m., ESPN+		at Fordham	W 89–81	6–1	26 – Holloway	9 – James	3 – Tied	Rose Hill Gymnasium (1,481); Bronx, NY
December 9, 2023*; 10:30 a.m., SECN		vs. Mississippi State; Holiday Hoopsgiving	L 76–106	6–2	18 – King	6 – Holloway	5 – Cross	State Farm Arena (–); Atlanta, GA
December 14, 2023*; 6:00 p.m., ESPN+		Furman	W 117–110 ^{2OT}	7–2	26 – Forbes	12 – Cross	12 – Cross	Devlin Fieldhouse (–); New Orleans, LA
December 16, 2023*; 1:00 p.m., ESPN+		Southern	W 105–81	8–2	28 – Forbes	10 – Cross	11 – Cross	Devlin Fieldhouse (1,407); New Orleans, LA
December 22, 2023*; 1:00 p.m., ESPN+		George Mason	L 66–69	8–3	17 – James	9 – Cross	5 – James	Devlin Fieldhouse (1,645); New Orleans, LA
December 29, 2023*; 6:00 p.m., ESPN+		Dillard	W 94–64	9–3	22 – Tied	8 – Cross	10 – King	Devlin Fieldhouse (1,103); New Orleans, LA
AAC regular season
January 3, 2024; 8:00 p.m., ESPNU		Rice	W 84–59	10–3 (1–0)	18 – Holloway	10 – Cross	6 – James	Devlin Fieldhouse (1,232); New Orleans, LA
January 6, 2024; 1:00 p.m., ESPNU		at North Texas	L 56–70	10–4 (1–1)	17 – Holloway	5 – Tied	3 – Cross	The Super Pit (3,374); Denton, TX
January 11, 2024; 6:00 p.m., ESPN2		No. 24 Florida Atlantic	L 84–85	10–5 (1–2)	28 – Forbes	11 – Cross	5 – Holloway	Devlin Fieldhouse (2,048); New Orleans, LA
January 14, 2024; 2:00 p.m., ESPN+		at Tulsa	W 94–87 ^{OT}	11–5 (2–2)	28 – Cross	9 – Cross	4 – James	Reynolds Center (2,904); Tulsa, OK
January 17, 2024; 7:00 p.m., ESPN+		at UAB	L 69–83	11–6 (2–3)	14 – Cross	8 – Forbes	3 – Cross	Bartow Arena (3,472); Birmingham, AL
January 21, 2024; 12:00 p.m., ESPN2		No. 10 Memphis	W 81–79	12–6 (3–3)	22 – James	7 – James	6 – James	Devlin Fieldhouse (3,621); New Orleans, LA
January 24, 2024; 7:00 p.m., ESPN+		at UTSA	L 88–89	12–7 (3–4)	23 – Tied	6 – Tied	5 – James	Convocation Center (1,281); San Antonio, TX
January 27, 2024; 3:00 p.m., ESPNU		Charlotte	L 71–75	12–8 (3–5)	16 – Cross	8 – James	5 – Cross	Devlin Fieldhouse (2,074); New Orleans, LA
February 1, 2024; 6:00 p.m., ESPN2		at SMU	L 76–80	12–9 (3–6)	27 – Cross	7 – Tied	5 – James	Moody Coliseum (5,284); Dallas, TX
February 4, 2024; 3:00 p.m., ESPNU		Temple	W 92–80	13–9 (4–6)	27 – Cross	8 – James	5 – Cross	Devlin Fieldhouse (1,950); New Orleans, LA
February 11, 2024; 1:00 p.m., ESPN2		at Memphis	L 78–90	13–10 (4–7)	16 – Holloway	9 – James	5 – Tied	FedExForum (12,111); Memphis, TN
February 15, 2024; 6:00 p.m., ESPN+		SMU	L 79–87	13–11 (4–8)	20 – Cross	6 – Tied	4 – Cross	Devlin Fieldhouse (1,231); New Orleans, LA
February 18, 2024; 1:00 p.m., ESPN+		at East Carolina	L 67–81	13–12 (4–9)	21 – Forbes	7 – Williams	6 – Cross	Williams Arena (4,725); Greenville, NC
February 25, 2024; 3:00 p.m., ESPN2		UAB	L 67–78	13–13 (4–10)	18 – Cross	5 – Tied	4 – Tied	Devlin Fieldhouse (1,605); New Orleans, LA
February 28, 2024; 6:00 p.m., ESPN+		North Texas	L 76–80	13–14 (4–11)	17 – Tied	8 – Cross	5 – Cross	Devlin Fieldhouse (1,409); New Orleans, LA
March 2, 2024; 11:00 a.m., ESPNU		at Florida Atlantic	L 73–79	13–15 (4–12)	19 – Holloway	5 – Tied	2 – Tied	Eleanor R. Baldwin Arena (3,161); Boca Raton, FL
March 5, 2024; 6:00 p.m., ESPN+		at No. 24 South Florida	L 72–85	13–16 (4–13)	24 – Forbes	8 – Cross	6 – Cross	Yuengling Center (10,354); Tampa, FL
March 8, 2024; 8:00 p.m., ESPN2		Wichita State	W 85–75	14–16 (5–13)	31 – Cross	9 – Cross	4 – Williams	Devlin Fieldhouse (1,835); New Orleans, LA
AAC tournament
March 14, 2024; 6:00 p.m., ESPNU	(10)	vs. (7) North Texas; Second Round	L 71–81	14–17	28 – James	10 – James	5 – Cross	Dickies Arena; Fort Worth, TX
*Non-conference game. ^{#}Rankings from AP Poll. (#) Tournament seedings in parentheses. All times are in Central Time.
