= 2023–24 Tulsa Golden Hurricane men's basketball team =

American college basketball season

2023–24 Tulsa Golden Hurricane men's basketball
- Conference: American Athletic Conference
- Record: 16–15 (7–11 AAC)
- Head coach: Eric Konkol (2nd season)
- Assistant coaches: Duffy Conroy; Desmond Haymon; Yaphett King
- Home arena: Reynolds Center

2023–24 American Athletic Conference men's basketball standings
| | Conf. | | | | Overall |
| Team | W | | L | PCT | W | | L | PCT |
|---|---|---|---|---|---|---|---|---|
| South Florida | 16 | – | 2 | .889 | 25 | – | 8 | .758 |
| Florida Atlantic | 14 | – | 4 | .778 | 25 | – | 9 | .735 |
| Charlotte | 13 | – | 5 | .722 | 19 | – | 12 | .613 |
| UAB † | 12 | – | 6 | .667 | 23 | – | 12 | .657 |
| Memphis | 11 | – | 7 | .611 | 22 | – | 10 | .688 |
| SMU | 11 | – | 7 | .611 | 20 | – | 13 | .606 |
| North Texas | 10 | – | 8 | .556 | 19 | – | 15 | .559 |
| East Carolina | 7 | – | 11 | .389 | 15 | – | 18 | .455 |
| Tulsa | 7 | – | 11 | .389 | 16 | – | 15 | .516 |
| Tulane | 5 | – | 13 | .278 | 14 | – | 17 | .452 |
| Temple | 5 | – | 13 | .278 | 16 | – | 20 | .444 |
| Wichita State | 5 | – | 13 | .278 | 15 | – | 19 | .441 |
| Rice | 5 | – | 13 | .278 | 11 | – | 21 | .344 |
| UTSA | 5 | – | 13 | .278 | 11 | – | 21 | .344 |
† 2024 AAC tournament winner

The 2023–24 Tulsa Golden Hurricane men's basketball team represented the University of Tulsa during the 2023–24 NCAA Division I men's basketball season. The Golden Hurricane, led by second-year head coach Eric Konkol, played their home games at the Reynolds Center in Tulsa, Oklahoma as members of the American Athletic Conference (AAC).

== Previous season ==
The Golden Hurricane finished the 2022–23 season 5–24, 1–17 in AAC play, to finish in last (11th) place. They were defeated by Wichita State in the first round of the AAC tournament.

== Offseason ==
=== Departures ===
| Name | Number | Pos. | Height | Weight | Year | Hometown | Reason for departure |
|---|---|---|---|---|---|---|---|
| Sam Griffin | 1 | G | 6' 4" | 180 | RS Junior | Miami, FL | Transferred to Wyoming |
| Keyshawn Embery-Simpson | 2 | G | 6' 3" | 193 | RS Senior | Midwest City, OK | Graduate transferred to Angelo State |
| Sterling Gaston-Chapman | 3 | G | 6' 5" | 210 | Sophomore | Wichita, KS | Transferred to UT Arlington |
| BB Knight | 4 | G | 6' 6" | 160 | Freshman | Katy, TX | Transferred to Lamar |
| Peyton Urbancic | 5 | G | 6' 6" | 199 | Junior | Naples, FL | Transferred |
| Tim Dalger | 10 | F | 6' 7" | 218 | RS Junior | Fort Lauderdale, FL | Transferred to Saint Louis |
| Brandon Betson | 11 | G | 6' 1" | 180 | Junior | Hercules, CA | Transferred to Sacramento State |
| Nikita Konstantynovskyi | 12 | F | 6' 10" | 237 | Junior | Kyiv, Ukraine | Transferred to Monmouth |
| Anthony Pritchard | 14 | G | 6' 3" | 170 | Sophomore | Tulsa, OK | Transferred to Central Michigan |
| Charles Chukwu | 15 | F | 6' 8" | 210 | Freshman | Katy, TX | Transferred to Garden City CC |
| Bryant Selebangue | 33 | F | 6' 9" | 215 | RS Sophomore | LaSalle, QC | Transferred to Arizona State |

=== Incoming transfers ===
| Name | Num | Pos. | Height | Weight | Year | Hometown | Previous school |
|---|---|---|---|---|---|---|---|
| Keaston Willis | 2 | G | 6' 3" | 190 | RS Senior | Sulphur Springs, TX | Louisiana Tech |
| Chauncey Gibson | 3 | G | 6' 5" | 190 | RS Freshman | Dallas, TX | Clemson |
| PJ Haggerty | 4 | G | 6' 3" | 183 | RS Freshman | Crosby, TX | TCU |
| Isaiah Barnes | 11 | G | 6' 7" | 200 | Sophomore | Chicago, IL | Michigan |
| Carlous Williams | 12 | F | 6' 5" | 230 | Junior | Hattiesburg, MS | Pearl River CC |
| Jared Garcia | 15 | F | 6' 8" | | Junior | Houston, TX | Salt Lake CC |
| Cobe Williams | 24 | G | 6' 0" | 180 | Senior | Dallas, TX | Louisiana Tech |
| Mohamed Keita | 34 | C | 7' 1" | 220 | Sophomore | Conakry, Guinea | St. John's |

=== Recruiting classes ===
==== 2023 recruiting class ====
College recruiting information
| Name | Hometown | School | Height | Weight | Commit date |
|---|---|---|---|---|---|
| Jarred Hall #58 PF | Lebanon, TN | Lebanon High School | 6 ft 7 in (2.01 m) | 190 lb (86 kg) | Oct 31, 2022 |
| Jarred Hall #58 PF | Recruit ratings: Rivals: 247Sports: ESPN: (79) | | | | |
| Matt Reed #39 C | Lewisville, TX | iSchool of Lewisville | 6 ft 8 in (2.03 m) | 220 lb (100 kg) | Nov 9, 2022 |
| Matt Reed #39 C | Recruit ratings: Rivals: 247Sports: ESPN: (79) | | | | |
| Tyshawn Archie; SG | Houston, TX | C.E. King High School | 6 ft 1 in (1.85 m) | 160 lb (73 kg) | Jun 23, 2023 |
| Tyshawn Archie; SG | Recruit ratings: Rivals: 247Sports: ESPN: (NR) | | | | |
Overall recruit ranking:
Note: In many cases, Scout, Rivals, 247Sports, On3, and ESPN may conflict in their listings of height and weight.; In these cases, the average was taken. ESPN grades are on a 100-point scale.; Sources: "Tulsa 2023 Basketball Commitments". Rivals.; "2023 Team Ranking". Rivals.; "2023 Tulsa Golden Hurricane Basketball 24/7 Sports Commits". 247Sports.

== Roster ==
2023–24 Tulsa Golden Hurricane men's basketball team
Players
Coaches

| Pos. | # | Name | Height | Weight | Year | Previous school | Hometown |
|---|---|---|---|---|---|---|---|
| G | 0 | Jesaiah McWright | 6 ft 4 in (1.93 m) | 176 lb (80 kg) | So | Cypress Falls HS | Houston, TX |
| F | 1 | Matt Reed | 6 ft 9 in (2.06 m) | 240 lb (109 kg) | Fr | ISchool Academy | Carrollton, TX |
| G | 2 | Keaston Willis | 6 ft 3 in (1.91 m) | 190 lb (86 kg) | RS Sr | Sulphur Springs HS; Louisiana Tech | Sulphur Springs, TX |
| G | 4 | PJ Haggerty | 6 ft 3 in (1.91 m) | 195 lb (88 kg) | RS Fr | Crosby HS; TCU | Crosby, TX |
| F | 5 | Jarred Hall | 6 ft 8 in (2.03 m) | — | Fr | Lebanon HS | Lebanon, TN |
| G | 8 | Tyshawn Archie | 6 ft 1 in (1.85 m) | 175 lb (79 kg) | Fr | SPIRE Academy | Houston, TX |
| G | 11 | Isaiah Barnes | 6 ft 7 in (2.01 m) | 200 lb (91 kg) | So | Simeon Career Academy; Michigan | Chicago, IL |
| F | 12 | Carlous Williams | 6 ft 5 in (1.96 m) | 230 lb (104 kg) | Jr | Harrison Central HS; Pearl River CC | Hattiesburg, MS |
| F | 15 | Jared Garcia | 6 ft 8 in (2.03 m) | 240 lb (109 kg) | Jr | St. Thomas More School; Salt Lake CC | Houston, TX |
| G | 22 | Ben Radford (W) | 6 ft 4 in (1.93 m) | 220 lb (100 kg) | Fr | Memorial HS | Tulsa, OK |
| G | 23 | Ari Seals (W) | 6 ft 3 in (1.91 m) | 177 lb (80 kg) | Sr | Frisco HS | Frisco, TX |
| G | 24 | Cobe Williams | 6 ft 0 in (1.83 m) | 180 lb (82 kg) | Sr | Kimball HS; Louisiana Tech | Dallas, TX |
| C | 34 | Mohamed Keita | 7 ft 1 in (2.16 m) | 220 lb (100 kg) | So | The Winchendon School; St. John's | Conakry, Guinea |

Head coach

- Eric Konkol (UW–Eau Claire)

Assistant coach(es)

- Duffy Conroy (St. Ambrose)
- Desmond Haymon (Stephen F. Austin)
- Yaphett King (Cal State Fullerton)

Legend

- (C) Team captain
- (S) Suspended
- (I) Ineligible
- (W) Walk-on
- Injured
- Current redshirt

Roster
Last update: December 10, 2023

== Schedule and results ==
| Date time, TV | Rank^{#} | Opponent^{#} | Result | Record | High points | High rebounds | High assists | Site (attendance) city, state |
Exhibition
| November 1, 2023*; 7:00 p.m. | | Oklahoma Christian | W 74–60 | | – | – | – | Reynolds Center; Tulsa, OK |
Non-conference regular season
| November 6, 2023*; 7:00 p.m., ESPN+ | | Central Arkansas | W 70–53 | 1–0 | 13 – Co. Williams | 10 – Garcia | 5 – Haggerty | Reynolds Center (2,770); Tulsa, OK |
| November 11, 2023*; 2:00 p.m., ESPN+ | | Incarnate Word | W 85–71 | 2–0 | 27 – Co. Williams | 10 – Barnes | 6 – Co. Williams | Reynolds Center (2,556); Tulsa, OK |
| November 16, 2023*; 7:00 p.m., ESPN+ | | Jackson State; Golden Turkey Slam | W 72–52 | 3–0 | 20 – Haggerty | 6 – tied | 3 – Co. Williams | Reynolds Center (2,754); Tulsa, OK |
| November 20, 2023*; 7:00 p.m., ESPN+ | | South Carolina State; Golden Turkey Slam | W 90–70 | 4–0 | 28 – Haggerty | 8 – tied | 4 – Haggerty | Reynolds Center (2,791); Tulsa, OK |
| November 25, 2023*; 2:00 p.m., ESPN+ | | at Little Rock | L 82–84 ^{OT} | 4–1 | 17 – Archie | 9 – tied | 4 – Haggerty | Jack Stephens Center (925); Little Rock, AR |
| December 2, 2023*; 7:00 p.m., ORUSN | | at Oral Roberts; PSO Mayor's Cup | L 70–79 | 4–2 | 17 – Haggerty | 7 – Garcia | 5 – Co. Williams | Mabee Center (6,949); Tulsa, OK |
| December 5, 2023*; 7:30 p.m., ESPN+ | | Loyola Chicago | W 88–77 | 5–2 | 15 – Willis | 6 – Garcia | 4 – Co. Williams | Reynolds Center (2,822); Tulsa, OK |
| December 10, 2023*; 5:30 p.m., ESPNU | | vs. Oklahoma State | L 57–72 | 5–3 | 14 – Haggerty | 6 – Reed | 2 – Archie | Paycom Center (–); Oklahoma City, OK |
| December 16, 2023*; 2:00 p.m., ESPN+ | | Missouri State | W 73–72 | 6–3 | 24 – Haggerty | 6 – Garcia | 3 – Haggerty | Reynolds Center (3,558); Tulsa, OK |
| December 19, 2023*; 7:00 p.m., ESPN+ | | Mississippi Valley State | W 79–50 | 7–3 | 13 – Barnes | 6 – Keita | 8 – Co. Williams | Reynolds Center (2,773); Tulsa, OK |
| December 22, 2023*; 7:00 p.m., ESPN+ | | New Mexico State | W 65–59 | 8–3 | 23 – Haggerty | 8 – tied | 4 – tied | Reynolds Center (2,871); Tulsa, OK |
| December 29, 2023*; 7:00 p.m., ESPN+ | | Southwestern Oklahoma State | W 95–54 | 9–3 | 21 – Haggerty | 9 – Reed | 4 – Haggerty | Reynolds Center (2,958); Tulsa, OK |
AAC regular season
| January 4, 2024; 7:00 p.m., ESPN+ | | No. 15 Memphis | L 75–78 | 9–4 (0–1) | 27 – Haggerty | 8 – Haggerty | 5 – Co. Williams | Reynolds Center (4,226); Tulsa, OK |
| January 7, 2024; 2:00 p.m., ESPNU | | at East Carolina | L 57–62 | 9–5 (0–2) | 18 – Co. Williams | 6 – tied | 5 – Haggerty | Williams Arena (4,454); Greenville, NC |
| January 10, 2024; 6:00 p.m., ESPN+ | | at Charlotte | L 76–84 | 9–6 (0–3) | 28 – Haggerty | 5 – tied | 5 – Co. Williams | Dale F. Halton Arena (3,066); Charlotte, NC |
| January 14, 2024; 2:00 p.m., ESPN+ | | Tulane | L 87–94 ^{OT} | 9–7 (0–4) | 25 – Haggerty | 16 – Reed | 5 – Haggerty | Reynolds Center (2,904); Tulsa, OK |
| January 17, 2024; 7:00 p.m., ESPN+ | | UTSA | W 107–78 | 10–7 (1–4) | 25 – Haggerty | 8 – Co. Williams | 7 – Haggerty | Reynolds Center (3,518); Tulsa, OK |
| January 20, 2024; 2:00 p.m., ESPN+ | | at SMU | L 70–103 | 10–8 (1–5) | 19 – Haggerty | 9 – Garcia | 5 – Co. Williams | Moody Coliseum (5,772); Dallas, TX |
| January 27, 2024; 7:00 p.m., ESPNU | | Rice | W 85–83 | 11–8 (2–5) | 21 – Haggerty | 8 – Garcia | 6 – Co. Williams | Tudor Fieldhouse (2,385); Houston, TX |
| January 31, 2024; 6:00 p.m., ESPNU | | Wichita State; Rivalry | W 79–68 | 12–8 (3–5) | 23 – Haggerty | 8 – Garcia | 4 – Haggerty | Reynolds Center (5,028); Tulsa, OK |
| February 3, 2024; 1:00 p.m., ESPN+ | | at No. 20 Florida Atlantic | L 70–102 | 12–9 (3–6) | 25 – Haggerty | 6 – Ca. Williams | 4 – Haggerty | Eleanor R. Baldwin Arena (3,161); Boca Raton, FL |
| February 7, 2024; 7:00 p.m., ESPN+ | | North Texas | L 55–68 | 12–10 (3–7) | 20 – Haggerty | 5 – Haggerty | 3 – Haggerty | Reynolds Center (4,054); Tulsa, OK |
| February 11, 2024; 1:00 p.m., ESPN+ | | UAB | L 63–70 | 12–11 (3–8) | 21 – Haggerty | 10 – Garcia | 4 – tied | Reynolds Center (3,124); Tulsa, OK |
| February 14, 2024; 6:00 p.m., ESPNU | | at South Florida | L 50–69 | 12–12 (3–9) | 19 – Haggerty | 6 – tied | 5 – Co. Williams | Yuengling Center (4,559); Tampa, FL |
| February 17, 2024; 2:00 p.m., ESPN+ | | Rice | W 93–82 ^{OT} | 13–12 (4–9) | 30 – Haggerty | 10 – Haggerty | 6 – Haggerty | Reynolds Center (3,665); Tulsa, OK |
| February 21, 2024; 8:00 p.m., ESPNU | | at Wichita State; Rivalry | L 63–79 | 13–13 (4–10) | 24 – Haggerty | 7 – Haggerty | 3 – Co. Williams | Charles Koch Arena (5,245); Wichita, KS |
| February 24, 2024; 7:00 p.m., ESPNU | | Charlotte | W 69–67 | 14–13 (5–10) | 24 – Garcia | 7 – Haggerty | 7 – Haggerty | Reynolds Center (3,341); Tulsa, OK |
| February 28, 2024; 7:00 p.m., ESPN+ | | at UTSA | L 73–89 | 14–14 (5–11) | 29 – Haggerty | 10 – Haggerty | 3 – McWright | Convocation Center (1,238); San Antonio, TX |
| March 2, 2024; 1:00 p.m., ESPN+ | | at Temple | W 72–67 | 15–14 (6–11) | 21 – tied | 8 – Garcia | 7 – Co. Williams | Liacouras Center (3,213); Philadelphia, PA |
| March 9, 2024; 2:00 p.m., ESPN+ | | No. 24 South Florida | W 76–70 | 16–14 (7–11) | 32 – Haggerty | 11 – Co. Williams | 5 – Haggerty | Reynolds Center (5,515); Tulsa, OK |
AAC tournament
| March 14, 2024; 11:30 a.m., ESPNU | (9) | vs. (8) East Carolina; Second round | L 79–84 | 16–15 | 29 – Haggerty | 8 – Garcia | 9 – Haggerty | Dickies Arena; Fort Worth, TX |
*Non-conference game. ^{#}Rankings from AP poll. (#) Tournament seedings in parentheses. All times are in Central.
