= Chuck Harris (basketball) =

American basketball player

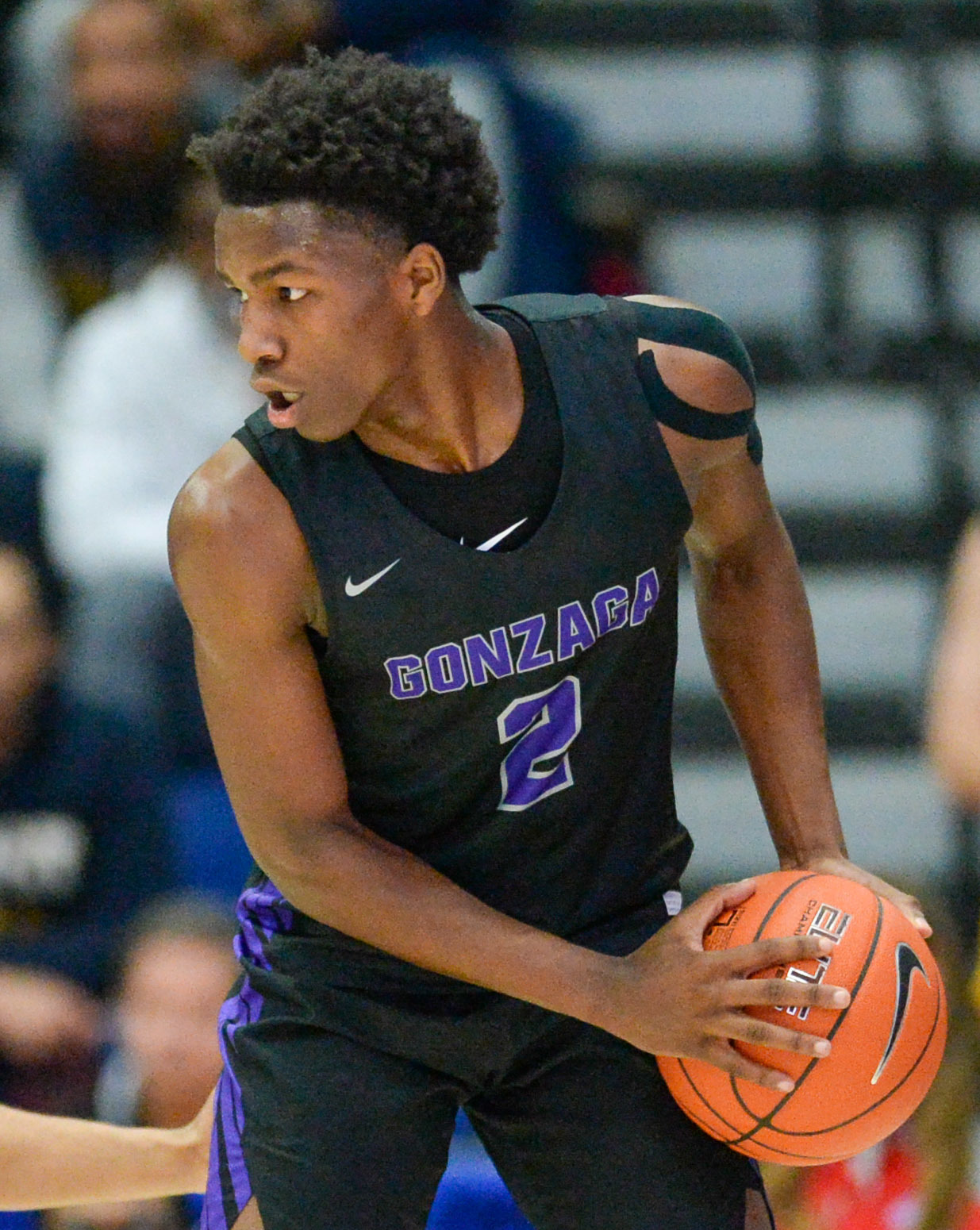
- Harris with Gonzaga College High School in 2020

No. 0 – MLP Academics Heidelberg
- Position: Shooting guard
- League: ProA

Personal information
- Born: September 21, 2001 (age 25) Ashburn, Virginia, U.S.
- Listed height: 6 ft 2 in (1.88 m)
- Listed weight: 200 lb (91 kg)

Career information
- High school: Gonzaga College (Washington, D.C.)
- College: Butler (2020–2023); SMU (2023–2025)
- NBA draft: 2025: undrafted
- Playing career: 2025–present

Career history
- 2025: Crailsheim Merlins
- 2025–2026: VfL Kirchheim Knights
- 2026–present: Heidelberg

Career highlights
- Big East All-Freshman Team (2021)

Charles Tyrone Harris Jr. (born September 21, 2001) is an American professional basketball player for MLP Academics Heidelberg of the ProA. He previously played for the Butler Bulldogs and SMU Mustangs.

== High school career ==
Harris played basketball for Gonzaga College High School in Washington, D.C. for four years under coach Steve Turner. He helped his team win two Washington Catholic Athletic Conference and D.C. State Athletic Association titles. As a senior, Harris averaged 12 points, four rebounds and four assists per game. He committed to playing college basketball for Butler over offers from Penn State and Virginia.

== College career ==
Harris scored 20 points in a 73–61 upset of Villanova on February 28, 2021. On March 6, Harris posted a freshman season-high 29 points, six rebounds and four assists in a 93–73 loss to Creighton. As a freshman, he averaged 12.9 points, three rebounds and 2.3 assists per game. Harris was a unanimous Big East All-Freshman Team selection. He became the first Butler freshman since Tony Warren in the 1979–80 season to lead the team in scoring. During the 2022 Big East Tournament, Harris tied his career-high with 29 points in an 89-82 victory over Xavier on March 9. As a sophomore, Harris averaged 11.4 points, 2.7 rebounds, and 1.6 assists per game. Harris had a career-best 32 points in an 80-66 win over Tennessee Tech on December 3, 2022. In his junior season, Harris averaged 10.4 points, 3.1 rebounds, and 2.4 assists per game. Following the season, he transferred to SMU. As a senior, Harris averaged a career-high 13.4 points, 3.2 rebounds, and 3.4 assists per game. During his return to Hinkle Fieldhouse, Harris had 21 points and 3 steals in an 81-70 loss against Butler on November 15, 2024. He averaged 12.9 points, 2.9 rebounds, and 2.7 assists per game in his last season.

== Professional career ==
On August 11, 2025, he signed with Crailsheim Merlins of the German ProA.

On October 26, 2025, he signed with VfL Kirchheim Knights of the German ProA.

On July 22, 2026, he signed with MLP Academics Heidelberg of the ProA.

== Career statistics ==
Legend
GP	Games played	GS	Games started	MPG	Minutes per game
FG%	Field goal percentage	3P%	3-point field goal percentage	FT%	Free throw percentage
RPG	Rebounds per game	APG	Assists per game	SPG	Steals per game
BPG	Blocks per game	PPG	Points per game	**Bold**	Career high

=== College ===
Year	Team	GP	GS	MPG	FG%	3P%	FT%	RPG	APG	SPG	BPG	PPG
2020–21	Butler	24	14	**29.8**	.401	.403	.836	3.0	2.3	**1.0**	.1	12.9
2021–22	Butler	31	21	28.8	.378	.298	.740	2.7	1.6	.5	.1	11.4
2022–23	Butler	29	24	29.1	.403	.340	**.853**	3.1	2.4	**1.0**	.1	10.4
2023-24	SMU	32	**32**	**29.8**	.432	.407	.818	**3.2**	**3.4**	**1.0**	.2	**13.4**
2024-25	SMU	**35**	19	27.8	**.444**	**.415**	.831	2.9	2.7	.8	**.2**	12.9
Career		151	110	28.9	.413	.375	.815	3.0	2.5	.8	.2	12.2

== Personal life ==
Harris is the third of four children and was born in Georgia. He moved to Louisiana and then to Virginia. His father Charles Sr. played basketball for Lincoln University.
