= 2023–24 UTSA Roadrunners men's basketball team =

American college basketball season

2023–24 UTSA Roadrunners men's basketball
- Conference: American Athletic Conference
- Record: 11–21 (5–13 AAC)
- Head coach: Steve Henson (8th season)
- Associate head coach: Mike Peck
- Assistant coaches: Adam Hood; Kurtis Darden
- Home arena: Convocation Center

2023–24 American Athletic Conference men's basketball standings
	Conf.				Overall
Team	W		L	PCT	W		L	PCT
South Florida	16	–	2	.889	25	–	8	.758
Florida Atlantic	14	–	4	.778	25	–	9	.735
Charlotte	13	–	5	.722	19	–	12	.613
UAB †	12	–	6	.667	23	–	12	.657
Memphis	11	–	7	.611	22	–	10	.688
SMU	11	–	7	.611	20	–	13	.606
North Texas	10	–	8	.556	19	–	15	.559
East Carolina	7	–	11	.389	15	–	18	.455
Tulsa	7	–	11	.389	16	–	15	.516
Tulane	5	–	13	.278	14	–	17	.452
Temple	5	–	13	.278	16	–	20	.444
Wichita State	5	–	13	.278	15	–	19	.441
Rice	5	–	13	.278	11	–	21	.344
UTSA	5	–	13	.278	11	–	21	.344
† 2024 AAC tournament winner

The 2023–24 UTSA Roadrunners men's basketball team represented the University of Texas at San Antonio in the 2023–24 NCAA Division I men's basketball season. The Roadrunners, led by eighth-year head coach Steve Henson, played their home games at the Convocation Center in San Antonio, Texas as first-year members of American Athletic Conference.

== Previous season ==
The Roadrunners finished the 2022–23 season 10–22, 4–16 in Conference USA (C-USA) play to finish in last place. They lost in the first round of the C-USA tournament to Rice.

The season marked the team's last season as members of C-USA before joining the American Athletic Conference on July 1, 2023.

== Offseason ==
=== Departures ===
Name	Number	Pos.	Height	Weight	Year	Hometown	Reason for departure
John Buggs	0	G	6' 3"	185	RS Sophomore	Homer, LA	Transferred to North Texas
Japhet Medor	1	G	6' 0"	168	RS Junior	Wellington, FL	Transferred to Fordham
Aleu Aleu	2	G/F	6' 9"	189	Senior	Austin, TX	Graduate transferred to St. Edward's
Azavier Johnson	3	G	6' 5"	202	RS Freshman	Las Vegas, NV	Transferred to New Mexico JC
Josh Farmer	4	F	6' 10"	198	Sophomore	Houston, TX	Transferred to Texas Southern
DJ Richards	5	F	6' 5"	180	Freshman	Houston, TX	Transferred to McNeese State
Erik Czumbel	10	G	6' 3"	196	Senior	Verona, Italy	Left the team for personal reasons
Lachlan Bofinger	11	F	6' 6"	223	Junior	Sydney, Australia	Transferred to St. Mary's
Sam Aldirawi	12	F	6' 5"	202	Freshman	Houston, TX	Walk-on; not on team roster
Lamin Sabally	20	F	6' 8"	204	Sophomore	Berlin, Germany	Transferred to Incarnate Word
Jacob Germany	24	C	6' 11"	238	Senior	Kingston, OK	Graduate transferred to Wichita State
Isaiah Addo-nkrah	25	G	6' 7"	220	Junior	Houston, TX	Walk-on; transferred to Denver

=== Incoming transfers ===
Name	Number	Pos.	Height	Weight	Year	Hometown	Previous school
Jordan Ivy-Curry	1	G	6' 2"	180	Junior	La Marque, TX	Pacific
Trey Edmonds	3	F	6' 10"	250	Junior	Aurora, CO	Utah Tech
Dre Fuller Jr.	4	G	6' 5"	215	RS Senior	Fayetteville, NC	UCF
Adante' Holiman	5	G	6' 0"	160	Sophomore	McAlester, OK	UT Rio Grande Valley
Chandler Cuthrell	10	F	6' 7"	200	Junior	Baltimore, MD	Odessa College
Isaiah Wyatt	11	G	6' 3"	200	RS Junior	Fort Worth, TX	Chadron State
Josh Reid	12	F	6' 7"		Junior	Havelock, NC	Walk-on; Gulf Coast State College
Juan Reyna	20	G	6'3"	185	Junior	San Antonio, TX	Campbell
PJ Carter	21	G	6' 5"		Junior	Fairburn, GA	Georgia Highlands College
Blessing Adesipe	23	F	6' 6"		RS Junior	Houston, TX	Miles CC
Justin Thomas	25	G	6' 7"	179	Junior	Baton Rouge, LA	Milwaukee

=== 2023 recruiting class ===
College recruiting
Name	Hometown	School	Height	Weight	Commit date
Nazar Mahmoud; SG	Plano, TX	Spring Creek Academy	6 ft 5 in (1.96 m)	185 lb (84 kg)	Mar 15, 2023
Nazar Mahmoud; SG	Recruit ratings: Rivals: 247Sports: (NR)				
Overall recruit ranking:
Note: In many cases, Scout, Rivals, 247Sports, On3, and ESPN may conflict in their listings of height and weight.; In these cases, the average was taken. ESPN grades are on a 100-point scale.; Sources: "2023 Team Ranking". Rivals.

== Roster ==
2023–24 UTSA Roadrunners men's basketball team
Players
Coaches

Pos.	#	Name	Height	Weight	Year	Previous school	Hometown
G	0	Nazar Mahmoud	6 ft 5 in (1.96 m)	180 lb (82 kg)	Fr	Spring Creek Academy	Leander, TX
G	1	Jordan Ivy-Curry	6 ft 3 in (1.91 m)	175 lb (79 kg)	Jr	Pacific	La Marque, TX
C	2	Carlton Jr. Linguard	7 ft 0 in (2.13 m)	225 lb (102 kg)	RS Sr	Kansas State	San Antonio, TX
F/C	3	Trey Edmonds	6 ft 10 in (2.08 m)	255 lb (116 kg)	Jr	Utah Tech	Aurora, CO
G	4	Dre Jr. Fuller	6 ft 6 in (1.98 m)	220 lb (100 kg)	GS	UCF	Fayetteville, NC
PG	5	Adante' Holiman	6 ft 0 in (1.83 m)	175 lb (79 kg)	So	UT Rio Grande Valley	McAlester, OK
F	10	Chandler Cuthrell	6 ft 8 in (2.03 m)	220 lb (100 kg)	Jr	Odessa College	Baltimore, MD
G/F	11	Isaiah Wyatt	6 ft 4 in (1.93 m)	220 lb (100 kg)	RS Jr	Chadron State	Toledo, OH
F	12	Josh Reid (W)	6 ft 7 in (2.01 m)	220 lb (100 kg)	Jr	Gulf Coast State College	Havelock, NC
F	14	Massal Diouf	6 ft 9 in (2.06 m)	240 lb (109 kg)	So	Western Canada Prep Academy	Gouda, Netherlands
PG	20	Juan Reyna	6 ft 3 in (1.91 m)	185 lb (84 kg)	Jr	Campbell	San Antonio, TX
G	21	PJ Carter	6 ft 5 in (1.96 m)	175 lb (79 kg)	Jr	Georgia Highlands College	Atlanta, GA
G	22	Christian Tucker (W)	6 ft 3 in (1.91 m)	178 lb (81 kg)	Jr	Gilbert Perry High School	Chandler, AZ
G/F	23	Blessing Adesipe	6 ft 6 in (1.98 m)	210 lb (95 kg)	Jr	Miles Community College	Houston, TX
G	25	Justin Thomas	6 ft 7 in (2.01 m)	180 lb (82 kg)	Jr	Milwaukee	Baton Rouge, LA

Head coach

- Steve Henson (Kansas State)

Assistant coach(es)

- Mike Peck (Northwood)
- Adam Hood (Air Force)
- Kurtis Darden (Pfeiffer)

Legend

- (C) Team captain
- (S) Suspended
- (I) Ineligible
- (W) Walk-on
- Injured
- Current redshirt

Roster
Last update: December 10, 2023

== Schedule and results ==
Date time, TV	Rank^{#}	Opponent^{#}	Result	Record	High points	High rebounds	High assists	Site (attendance) city, state
Exhibition
October 24, 2023*; 7:00 p.m.		Trinity	W 100–70		20 – Linguard Jr.	11 – Cuthrell	5 – tied	Convocation Center; San Antonio, TX
October 30, 2023*; 7:00 p.m.		McMurry	W 125–84		16 – Tucker	12 – Linguard Jr.	5 – tied	Convocation Center; San Antonio, TX
Non-conference regular season
November 6, 2023*; 7:00 p.m., ESPN+		Western Illinois	W 78–68 ^{OT}	1–0	18 – Tucker	10 – Linguard Jr.	8 – Tucker	Convocation Center (1,567); San Antonio, TX
November 10, 2023*; 6:30 p.m., Peacock		at Minnesota	L 76–102	1–1	16 – Fuller Jr.	9 – Fuller Jr.	5 – Tucker	Williams Arena (6,973); Minneapolis, MN
November 14, 2023*; 7:00 p.m., ESPN+		at Lamar	L 82–90	1–2	22 – Holiman	12 – Edmonds	6 – Tucker	Montagne Center (3,264); Beaumont, TX
November 17, 2023*; 7:15 p.m., ESPN+		at Texas State; I-35 Rivalry	L 62–72	1–3	16 – Tucker	10 – Cuthrell	4 – Holiman	Strahan Coliseum (1,801); San Marcos, TX
November 20, 2023*; 7:00 p.m., ESPN+		at Houston Christian	W 89–87	2–3	24 – Fuller Jr.	7 – Edmonds	8 – Tucker	Sharp Gymnasium (804); Houston, TX
November 24, 2023*; 3:00 p.m., ESPN+		Jacksonville State; Roadrunner/Cardinal Classic	L 62–77	2–4	19 – Tucker	10 – Fuller Jr.	3 – Tucker	Convocation Center (676); San Antonio, TX
November 26, 2023*; 3:00 p.m., ESPN+		Incarnate Word; Roadrunner/Cardinal Classic	W 90–80	3–4	21 – Holiman	11 – Fuller Jr.	4 – Tucker	Convocation Center (916); San Antonio, TX
November 30, 2023*; 8:00 p.m., ESPN+		Lamar	W 86–83	4–4	27 – Wyatt	10 – Fuller Jr.	11 – Tucker	Convocation Center (1,535); San Antonio, TX
December 10, 2023*; 12:00 p.m., ESPN+		Arkansas–Fort Smith	W 93–60	5–4	21 – Linguard Jr.	8 – tied	6 – Tucker	Convocation Center (927); San Antonio, TX
December 13, 2023*; 6:30 p.m., ESPN+		at Little Rock	L 84–93	5–5	23 – Tucker	9 – Wyatt	5 – Fuller Jr.	Jack Stephens Center; Little Rock, AR
December 17, 2023*; 2:00 p.m., P12N		at Oregon State	L 65–66	5–6	11 – Ivy-Curry	6 – Edmonds	7 – Ivy-Curry	Gill Coliseum (2,440); Corvallis, OR
December 21, 2023*; 7:00 p.m., ESPN+		Army	L 53–63	5–7	10 – tied	10 – Edmonds	3 – tied	Convocation Center (1,193); San Antonio, TX
December 28, 2023*; 7:00 p.m., ESPN+		Prairie View A&M	W 103–89	6–7	22 – Ivy-Curry	10 – Linguard Jr.	8 – Ivy-Curry	Convocation Center (1,082); San Antonio, TX
AAC regular season
January 2, 2024; 7:00 p.m., ESPNU		UAB	L 76–78	6–8 (0–1)	20 – Ivy-Curry	10 – Ivy-Curry	4 – Ivy-Curry	Convocation Center (744); San Antonio, TX
January 6, 2024; 2:00 p.m., ESPN+		at Rice	W 89–82 ^{OT}	7–8 (1–1)	24 – Linguard Jr.	7 – Ivy-Curry	7 – Tucker	Jerabeck Activity and Athletic Center (1,424); Houston, TX
January 10, 2024; 7:00 p.m., ESPN+		at No. 13 Memphis	L 101–107 ^{OT}	7–9 (1–2)	28 – Ivy-Curry	9 – Ivy-Curry	7 – Tucker	FedExForum (11,389); Memphis, TN
January 13, 2024; 2:00 p.m., ESPNU		Charlotte	L 58–66	7–10 (1–3)	20 – Ivy-Curry	11 – Edmonds	2 – Ivy-Curry	Convocation Center (1,202); San Antonio, TX
January 17, 2024; 7:00 p.m., ESPN+		at Tulsa	L 78–107	7–11 (1–4)	19 – Ivy-Curry	7 – Ivy-Curry	8 – Tucker	Reynolds Center (3,518); Tulsa, OK
January 21, 2024; 2:00 p.m., ESPN+		No. 23 Florida Atlantic	L 103–112 ^{OT}	7–12 (1–5)	38 – Ivy-Curry	7 – Ivy-Curry	12 – Tucker	Convocation Center (1,929); San Antonio, TX
January 24, 2024; 7:00 p.m., ESPN+		Tulane	W 89–88	8–12 (2–5)	31 – Linguard Jr.	11 – Cuthrell	5 – tied	Convocation Center (1,281); San Antonio, TX
January 27, 2024; 3:00 p.m., ESPN+		at South Florida	L 72–89	8–13 (2–6)	23 – Ivy-Curry	6 – Diouf	6 – Tucker	Yuengling Center (5,271); Tampa, FL
February 3, 2024; 2:00 p.m., ESPN+		Rice	L 76–80	8–14 (2–7)	19 – Ivy-Curry	10 – Linguard Jr.	8 – Tucker	Convocation Center (1,387); San Antonio, TX
February 7, 2024; 6:30 p.m., ESPN+		at Wichita State	L 64–84	8–15 (2–8)	13 – Fuller Jr.	6 – Edmonds	3 – Holiman	Charles Koch Arena (6,133); Wichita, KS
February 10, 2024; 2:00 p.m., ESPNU		East Carolina	L 73–84	8–16 (2–9)	14 – Ivy-Curry	6 – Fuller Jr.	3 – Ivy-Curry	Convocation Center (1,535); San Antonio, TX
February 15, 2024; 6:00 p.m., ESPN+		at Charlotte	L 70–79	8–17 (2–10)	22 – Carter	10 – Edmonds	3 – Ivy-Curry	Dale F. Halton Arena (3,706); Charlotte, NC
February 18, 2024; 1:00 p.m., ESPN+		at Temple	L 77–83	8–18 (2–11)	22 – Ivy-Curry	9 – Cuthrell	3 – Ivy-Curry	Liacouras Center (4,482); Philadelphia, PA
February 21, 2024; 7:00 p.m., ESPN+		South Florida	L 61–66	8–19 (2–12)	15 – Tucker	10 – tied	6 – Tucker	Convocation Center (1,580); San Antonio, TX
February 24, 2024; 3:00 p.m., ESPNU		at North Texas	W 64–62	9–19 (3–12)	21 – Ivy-Curry	8 – Ivy-Curry	3 – Ivy-Curry	The Super Pit (5,247); Denton, TX
February 28, 2024; 7:00 p.m., ESPN+		Tulsa	W 89–73	10–19 (4–12)	20 – Ivy-Curry	7 – Ivy-Curry	14 – Tucker	Convocation Center (1,238); San Antonio, TX
March 2, 2024; 2:00 p.m., ESPN+		at SMU	W 77–73	11–19 (5–12)	33 – Ivy-Curry	11 – Cuthrell	9 – Tucker	Moody Coliseum (5,507); Dallas, TX
March 10, 2024; 2:00 p.m., ESPN+		Temple	L 82–84	11–20 (5–13)	27 – Carter	9 – tied	5 – Tucker	Convocation Center (1,096); San Antonio, TX
AAC tournament
March 13, 2024; 2:00 p.m., ESPN+	(14)	vs. (11) Temple; First round	L 61–64	11–21	15 – Tucker	15 – Linguard Jr.	4 – Tucker	Dickies Arena; Fort Worth, TX
*Non-conference game. ^{#}Rankings from AP poll. (#) Tournament seedings in parentheses. All times are in Central.

== See also ==
- 2023–24 UTSA Roadrunners women's basketball team
