= 2023–24 Charlotte 49ers men's basketball team =

American college basketball season

2023–24 Charlotte 49ers men's basketball
- Conference: American Athletic Conference
- Record: 19–12 (13–5 AAC)
- Head coach: Aaron Fearne (1st season)
- Assistant coaches: Vic Sfera; Kevin Smith; Conner Henry
- Home arena: Dale F. Halton Arena

2023–24 American Athletic Conference men's basketball standings
	Conf.				Overall
Team	W		L	PCT	W		L	PCT
South Florida	16	–	2	.889	25	–	8	.758
Florida Atlantic	14	–	4	.778	25	–	9	.735
Charlotte	13	–	5	.722	19	–	12	.613
UAB †	12	–	6	.667	23	–	12	.657
Memphis	11	–	7	.611	22	–	10	.688
SMU	11	–	7	.611	20	–	13	.606
North Texas	10	–	8	.556	19	–	15	.559
East Carolina	7	–	11	.389	15	–	18	.455
Tulsa	7	–	11	.389	16	–	15	.516
Tulane	5	–	13	.278	14	–	17	.452
Temple	5	–	13	.278	16	–	20	.444
Wichita State	5	–	13	.278	15	–	19	.441
Rice	5	–	13	.278	11	–	21	.344
UTSA	5	–	13	.278	11	–	21	.344
† 2024 AAC tournament winner

The 2023–24 Charlotte 49ers men's basketball team represented the University of North Carolina at Charlotte during the 2023–24 NCAA Division I men's basketball season. The team, led by first-year head coach Aaron Fearne, played their home games at Dale F. Halton Arena in Charlotte, North Carolina, in their first season as members in the American Athletic Conference.

== Previous season ==
The 49ers finished the 2022–23 season with a record of 22–14, 9–11 in C-USA play to finish in fifth place. As the #5 seed in the C-USA Tournament, they would be defeated by #4 seed Middle Tennessee in the quarterfinals. They were invited to play in the CBI, where they defeated Western Carolina in the first round, Milwaukee in the quarterfinals, Radford in the semifinals, and 8th seed Eastern Kentucky to win their first-ever postseason tournament championship. This season marked the team's last season as members of Conference USA, before joining the American Athletic Conference on July 1, 2023.

On June 6, 2023, head coach Ron Sanchez announced that he would be returning to Virginia as the associate head coach, the role he held prior to his hiring at Charlotte, ending his five year tenure. The following day, associate head coach Aaron Fearne was named interim head coach, with his appointment for the entire 2023–24 season becoming official a week later.

== Offseason ==
=== Departures ===
Name	Number	Pos.	Height	Weight	Year	Hometown	Reason for departure
Montre Gipson	1	G	5'11"	200	GS Senior	DeSoto, TX	Graduated
Brice Williams	3	G	6'7"	215	RS Junior	Huntersville, NC	Transferred to Nebraska
Regin Larson	14	G	6'6"	185	Senior	Charlotte, NC	Walk-on; left the team for personal reasons
Aly Khalifa	15	F/C	6'11"	230	RS Sophomore	Alexandria, Egypt	Transferred to BYU
Musa Jallow	21	G	6'5"	210	GS Senior	Bloomington, IN	Graduated
Josh Aldrich	22	G/F	6'8"	224	Senior	Wilmington, NC	Graduated

=== Incoming transfers ===
Name	Number	Pos.	Height	Weight	Year	Hometown	Previous school
Dishon Jackson	1	C	6'10"	250	RS Sophomore	Oakland, CA	Washington State
Dean Reiber	21	F	6'10"	225	RS Junior	Greensboro, NC	Rutgers
Iaroslav Niagu	99	F	7'0"	215	Sophomore	Krasnodar, Russia	USC

=== 2023 recruiting class ===
College recruiting information
Name	Hometown	School	Height	Weight	Commit date
Nick Richart; C	Zionsville, IN	Zionsville High School	6 ft 9 in (2.06 m)	220 lb (100 kg)	Dec 4, 2022
Nick Richart; C	Recruit ratings: Scout: Rivals: 247Sports: (NR)				
Overall recruit ranking:
Note: In many cases, Scout, Rivals, 247Sports, On3, and ESPN may conflict in their listings of height and weight.; In these cases, the average was taken. ESPN grades are on a 100-point scale.; Sources: "2023 Team Ranking". Rivals.

== Roster ==
2023–24 Charlotte 49ers men's basketball team
Players
Coaches

Pos.	#	Name	Height	Weight	Year	Previous school	Hometown
F	0	Rich Rolf	6 ft 7 in (2.01 m)	205 lb (93 kg)	RS Fr	Centerville High School	Centerville, OH
C	1	Dishon Jackson	6 ft 11 in (2.11 m)	260 lb (118 kg)	RS So	Washington State	Oakland, CA
F	2	Andrew Bailey	6 ft 6 in (1.98 m)	210 lb (95 kg)	Fr	SV Böblingen Panthers	Ramstein, Germany
G	3	Sterling Young	6 ft 1 in (1.85 m)	175 lb (79 kg)	RS Jr	Pratt Community College	Queens, NY
G	5	Isaiah Folkes	6 ft 4 in (1.93 m)	200 lb (91 kg)	Jr	Middleburg Academy	Gainesville, VA
G	10	Nik Graves	6 ft 3 in (1.91 m)	185 lb (84 kg)	So	Greensboro Day School	Durham, NC
G	11	Daylen Berry	6 ft 4 in (1.93 m)	175 lb (79 kg)	RS So	Panther Creek High School	Cary, NC
G	12	Jackson Threadgill	6 ft 6 in (1.98 m)	200 lb (91 kg)	Sr	Davidson Day School	Concord, NC
F	20	Robert Braswell IV	6 ft 7 in (2.01 m)	205 lb (93 kg)	GS	Syracuse	Jacksonville, FL
F	21	Dean Reiber	6 ft 10 in (2.08 m)	225 lb (102 kg)	RS Jr	Rutgers	Greensboro, NC
F	24	Igor Milicic Jr.	6 ft 10 in (2.08 m)	225 lb (102 kg)	Jr	Virginia	Rovinj, Croatia
G	25	Lu'Cye Patterson	6 ft 2 in (1.88 m)	205 lb (93 kg)	RS Jr	Missouri State	Minneapolis, MN
G	30	Tyler Fearne (W)	6 ft 6 in (1.98 m)	185 lb (84 kg)	RS So	Concord Academy	Cairns, Australia
C	31	Nick Richart	6 ft 10 in (2.08 m)	225 lb (102 kg)	Fr	Zionsville High School	Zionsville, IN
F	99	Iaroslav Niagu	7 ft 0 in (2.13 m)	235 lb (107 kg)	So	USC	Krasnodar, Russia

Head coach

- Aaron Fearne (Mayville State)

Assistant coach(es)

- Vic Sfera (Memphis)
- Kevin Smith (Richmond)
- Conner Henry (UC Santa Barbara)

Legend

- (C) Team captain
- (S) Suspended
- (I) Ineligible
- (W) Walk-on
- Injured
- Current redshirt

Roster
Last update: December 10, 2023

== Schedule and results ==
Date time, TV	Rank^{#}	Opponent^{#}	Result	Record	High points	High rebounds	High assists	Site (attendance) city, state
Non-conference regular season
November 6, 2023*; 7:00 p.m., ESPN+		Maine	W 69–52	1–0	15 – Graves	8 – Milicic Jr.	4 – Tied	Dale F. Halton Arena (3,510); Charlotte, NC
November 10, 2023*; 4:30 p.m., ESPN+		vs. Liberty; He Gets Us Hall of Fame Series	L 59–71	1–1	13 – Milicic Jr.	10 – Milicic Jr.	2 – Tied	Spectrum Center (6,783); Charlotte, NC
November 15, 2023*; 7:00 p.m., ESPN+		Utah Valley; Jacksonville Classic campus game	W 62–45	2–1	16 – Jackson	12 – Milicic Jr.	5 – Graves	Dale F. Halton Arena (2,784); Charlotte, NC
November 19, 2023*; 5:30 p.m.		vs. George Mason; Jacksonville Classic Coast semifinals	W 54–49	3–1	18 – Patterson	13 – Milicic Jr.	3 – Graves	Flagler Gymnasium (351); St. Augustine, FL
November 20, 2023*; 8:30 p.m.		vs. UCF; Jacksonville Classic Coast championship	L 71–74 ^{OT}	3–2	21 – Patterson	10 – Milicic Jr.	4 – Patterson	Flagler Gymnasium (329); St. Augustine, FL
November 25, 2023*; 6:00 p.m., ESPN+		Georgia State	W 65–57	4–2	23 – Patterson	9 – Jackson	4 – Milicic Jr.	Dale F. Halton Arena (2,218); Charlotte, NC
November 29, 2023*; 8:00 p.m., ESPN+		Davidson	L 81–85	4–3	19 – Milicic Jr.	8 – Milicic Jr.	6 – Graves	Dale F. Halton Arena (4,030); Charlotte, NC
December 5, 2023*; 7:00 p.m., ESPN+		Stetson	W 85–62	5–3	19 – Jackson	9 – Milicic Jr.	8 – Patterson	Dale F. Halton Arena (2,708); Charlotte, NC
December 9, 2023*; 2:15 p.m., The CW		at No. 22 Duke	L 56–80	5–4	14 – Patterson	6 – Milicic Jr.	4 – Patterson	Cameron Indoor Stadium (9,314); Durham, NC
December 16, 2023*; 7:00 p.m., ESPN+		at Richmond	L 56–64	5–5	13 – Graves	7 – Patterson	3 – Tied	Robins Center (5,222); Richmond, VA
December 22, 2023*; 1:00 p.m., ESPN+		Greensboro	W 91–44	6–5	21 – Braswell IV	9 – Tied	5 – Tied	Dale F. Halton Arena (2,186); Charlotte, NC
December 29, 2023*; 7:00 p.m., ESPN+		at Stetson	L 75–79	6–6	22 – Milicic Jr.	9 – Milicic Jr.	4 – Patterson	Edmunds Center (457); DeLand, FL
AAC regular season
January 2, 2024; 9:00 p.m., ESPN2		at SMU	L 54–66	6–7 (0–1)	19 – Patterson	13 – Milicic Jr.	5 – Graves	Moody Coliseum (4,513); Dallas, TX
January 6, 2024; 4:00 p.m., ESPN+		No. 17 Florida Atlantic	W 70–68	7–7 (1–1)	16 – Patterson	9 – Jackson	5 – Patterson	Dale F. Halton Arena (3,785); Charlotte, NC
January 10, 2024; 7:00 p.m., ESPN+		Tulsa	W 84–76	8–7 (2–1)	20 – Graves	10 – Milicic Jr.	3 – Tied	Dale F. Halton Arena (3,066); Charlotte, NC
January 13, 2024; 8:00 p.m., ESPNU		at UTSA	W 66–58	9–7 (3–1)	19 – Milicic Jr.	5 – Tied	6 – Folkes	Convocation Center (1,202); San Antonio, TX
January 16, 2024; 8:00 p.m., ESPN+		at Rice	W 81–79 ^{OT}	10–7 (4–1)	22 – Patterson	8 – Milicic Jr.	5 – Graves	Tudor Fieldhouse (1,699); Houston, TX
January 20, 2024; 4:00 p.m., ESPN+		North Texas	W 56–44	11–7 (5–1)	20 – Patterson	9 – Tied	3 – Folkes	Dale F. Halton Arena (4,514); Charlotte, NC
January 23, 2024; 7:00 p.m., ESPN+		UAB	W 76–70	12–7 (6–1)	23 – Patterson	4 – Tied	5 – Patterson	Dale F. Halton Arena (4,155); Charlotte, NC
January 27, 2024; 4:00 p.m., ESPNU		at Tulane	W 75–71	13–7 (7–1)	22 – Milicic Jr.	13 – Milicic Jr.	3 – Milicic Jr.	Devlin Fieldhouse (2,074); New Orleans, LA
February 3, 2024; 2:00 p.m., ESPNU		East Carolina	W 67–52	14–7 (8–1)	16 – Patterson	10 – Milicic Jr.	7 – Graves	Dale F. Halton Arena (8,201); Charlotte, NC
February 6, 2024; 9:00 p.m., ESPN2		at South Florida	L 69–72	14–8 (8–2)	16 – Jackson	9 – Milicic	5 – Milicic	Yuengling Center (6,156); Tampa, FL
February 11, 2024; 2:00 p.m., ESPN+		at Temple	W 73–70	15–8 (9–2)	22 – Patterson	11 – Tied	4 – Folkes	Liacouras Center (2,602); Philadelphia, PA
February 15, 2024; 7:00 p.m., ESPN+		UTSA	W 79–70	16–8 (10–2)	19 – Jackson	7 – Milicic Jr.	5 – Folkes	Dale F. Halton Arena (3,706); Charlotte, NC
February 18, 2024; 12:00 p.m., ESPN2		Wichita State	W 72–61	17–8 (11–2)	19 – Patterson	14 – Milicic Jr.	3 – Graves	Dale F. Halton Arena (4,215); Charlotte, NC
February 21, 2024; 8:00 p.m., ESPN+		at Memphis	L 52–76	17–9 (11–3)	16 – Milicic Jr.	9 – Jackson	4 – Graves	FedExForum (10,709); Memphis, TN
February 24, 2024; 8:00 p.m., ESPNU		at Tulsa	L 67–69	17–10 (11–4)	20 – Patterson	12 – Jackson	5 – Patterson	Reynolds Center (3,341); Tulsa, OK
March 2, 2024; 4:00 p.m., ESPN+		No. 25 South Florida	L 61–76	17–11 (11–5)	17 – Patterson	5 – Tied	2 – Tied	Dale F. Halton Arena (7,024); Charlotte, NC
March 6, 2024; 7:00 p.m., ESPN+		Rice	W 69–64	18–11 (12–5)	26 – Milicic Jr.	10 – Milicic Jr.	3 – Tied	Dale F. Halton Arena (3,027); Charlotte, NC
March 9, 2024; 4:00 p.m., ESPN+		at East Carolina	W 82–72	19–11 (13–5)	27 – Patterson	10 – Jackson	7 – Jackson	Williams Arena (4,548); Greenville, NC
AAC tournament
March 15, 2024; 9:00 p.m., ESPNU	(3)	vs. (11) Temple; Quarterfinals	L 54–58	19–12	17 – Patterson	16 – Milicic Jr.	3 – Jackson	Dickies Arena (5,471); Fort Worth, TX
*Non-conference game. ^{#}Rankings from AP Poll. (#) Tournament seedings in parentheses. All times are in Eastern.

== Rankings ==
Ranking movements
	Week																			
Poll	Pre	1	2	3	4	5	6	7	8	9	10	11	12	13	14	15	16	17	18	Final
AP																				Not released
Coaches																				

*AP does not release post-NCAA Tournament rankings

== See also ==
- 2023–24 Charlotte 49ers women's basketball team
