= 2023–24 SMU Mustangs men's basketball team =

American college basketball season

2023–24 SMU Mustangs men's basketball
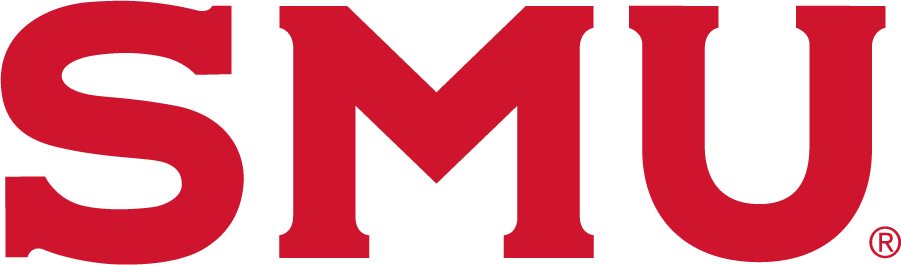

NIT, First Round
- Conference: American Athletic Conference
- Record: 20–13 (11–7 American)
- Head coach: Rob Lanier (2nd season)
- Assistant coaches: Chris Kreider; Cliff Warren; Josten Crow; Andre Owens; Jordan Glover
- Home arena: Moody Coliseum

2023–24 American Athletic Conference men's basketball standings
	Conf.				Overall
Team	W		L	PCT	W		L	PCT
South Florida	16	–	2	.889	25	–	8	.758
Florida Atlantic	14	–	4	.778	25	–	9	.735
Charlotte	13	–	5	.722	19	–	12	.613
UAB †	12	–	6	.667	23	–	12	.657
Memphis	11	–	7	.611	22	–	10	.688
SMU	11	–	7	.611	20	–	13	.606
North Texas	10	–	8	.556	19	–	15	.559
East Carolina	7	–	11	.389	15	–	18	.455
Tulsa	7	–	11	.389	16	–	15	.516
Tulane	5	–	13	.278	14	–	17	.452
Temple	5	–	13	.278	16	–	20	.444
Wichita State	5	–	13	.278	15	–	19	.441
Rice	5	–	13	.278	11	–	21	.344
UTSA	5	–	13	.278	11	–	21	.344
† 2024 AAC tournament winner

The 2023–24 SMU Mustangs men's basketball team represented Southern Methodist University during the 2023–24 NCAA Division I men's basketball season. The Mustangs were led by second-year head coach Rob Lanier and played their home games at Moody Coliseum on their campus in University Park, Texas as members of the American Athletic Conference (The American). They finished the season 20–13, 11–7 in AAC play to finish in a tie for fifth place. As the No. 6 seed in the AAC tournament, they lost to Temple in the second round.

On March 21, 2024, the school fired head coach Rob Lanier after two seasons. On April 1, the school named USC head coach Andy Enfield the team's new head coach.

The season was SMU's final season in the AAC, as the university joined the Atlantic Coast Conference in July 2024.

== Previous season ==
The Mustangs finished the 2022–23 season 10–21, 5–13 in AAC play to finish in tenth place. They were defeated by UCF in the first round of the AAC tournament.

== Offseason ==
=== Departures ===
Name	Number	Pos.	Height	Weight	Year	Hometown	Reason for departure
Jefferson Koulibaly	0	G	6'3"	185	RS Sophomore	Montreal, QC	Transferred
Stefan Todorović	3	F	6'8"	190	Sophomore	Belgrade, Serbia	Transferred to San Francisco
Zach Nutall	10	G	6'3"	185	Senior	Bryan, TX	Graduated
Darius McBride	15	G	6'4"	190	RS Junior	Cedar Park, TX	Playing professionally overseas
Efe Odigie	23	F	6'9"	240	Senior	Houston, TX	Graduated
Franklin Agunanne	33	F	6'9"	245	RS Senior	Abuja, Nigeria	Graduated

=== Incoming transfers ===
Name	Num	Pos.	Height	Weight	Year	Hometown	Previous school
B.J. Edwards	0	G	6'3"	192	Sophomore	Knoxville, TN	Tennessee
Chuck Harris	3	G	6'2"	200	Senior	Ashburn, VA	Butler
Denver Anglin	4	G	6'2"	165	Sophomore	Montclair, NJ	Georgetown
Tyreek Smith	12	F	6'7"	217	RS Senior	Baton Rouge, LA	Oklahoma State
Ja'Heim Hudson	15	F	6'7"	230	Junior	Hinesville, GA	Georgia State

=== 2023 Recruiting class ===
There were no incoming recruits for the class of 2023.

=== 2024 Recruiting class ===
College recruiting information (2024)
Name	Hometown	School	Height	Weight	Commit date
Chance Puryear #22 PF	Dallas, TX	Carter High School	6 ft 7 in (2.01 m)	200 lb (91 kg)	Jun 8, 2023
Chance Puryear #22 PF	Recruit ratings: Rivals: 247Sports: ESPN: (80)				
Overall recruit ranking:
Note: In many cases, Scout, Rivals, 247Sports, On3, and ESPN may conflict in their listings of height and weight.; In these cases, the average was taken. ESPN grades are on a 100-point scale.; Sources: "SMU 2024 Basketball Commitments". Rivals.; "2024 Team Ranking". Rivals.; "2024 SMU Mustangs Basketball 24/7 Sports Commits". 247Sports.

== Roster ==
2023–24 SMU Mustangs men's basketball team
Players
Coaches

Pos.	#	Name	Height	Weight	Year	Previous school	Hometown
G	0	B.J. Edwards	6 ft 3 in (1.91 m)	188 lb (85 kg)	So	Knoxville Catholic High School	Knoxville, TN
G	1	Zhuric Phelps	6 ft 3 in (1.91 m)	195 lb (88 kg)	So	Duncanville High School	Midland, TX
G	2	Jalen Smith	6 ft 4 in (1.93 m)	190 lb (86 kg)	Jr	Oak Ridge High School	Orlando, FL
G	3	Chuck Harris	6 ft 2 in (1.88 m)	200 lb (91 kg)	Sr	Butler	Ashburn, VA
G	4	Denver Anglin	6 ft 2 in (1.88 m)	185 lb (84 kg)	So	Georgetown	Montclair, NJ
G	5	Ricardo Wright	6 ft 3 in (1.91 m)	185 lb (84 kg)	Sr	Marist	Eustis, FL
F	10	Samuell Williamson	6 ft 8 in (2.03 m)	200 lb (91 kg)	GS	Louisville	Rockwall, TX
F	12	Tyreek Smith	6 ft 9 in (2.06 m)	217 lb (98 kg)	RS Sr	Texas Tech	Baton Rouge, LA
C	13	Mo Njie	6 ft 11 in (2.11 m)	245 lb (111 kg)	Jr	Eastern Michigan	Centerville, OH
F	15	Ja'Heim Hudson	6 ft 7 in (2.01 m)	230 lb (104 kg)	Jr	Georgia State	Hinesville, GA
F	20	Xavier Foster	6 ft 11 in (2.11 m)	235 lb (107 kg)	Jr	Iowa State	Oskaloosa, IA
F	22	Keon Ambrose-Hylton	6 ft 8 in (2.03 m)	215 lb (98 kg)	Sr	Alabama	Toronto, ON
G	24	Emory Lanier (W)	6 ft 3 in (1.91 m)	190 lb (86 kg)	Sr	Davidson	Atlanta, GA
G	31	Trey Utter (W)	6 ft 0 in (1.83 m)	160 lb (73 kg)	So	Argyle High School	Argyle, TX
G	32	Jackson Young (W)	6 ft 2 in (1.88 m)	185 lb (84 kg)	Jr	Hawaii Pacific	Kerrville, TX

Head coach

- Rob Lanier (St. Bonaventure)

Assistant coach(es)

- Chris Kreider (Lebanon Valley)
- Cliff Warren (Mount St. Mary's)
- Josten Crow (Sam Houston State)

Legend

- (C) Team captain
- (S) Suspended
- (I) Ineligible
- (W) Walk-on
- Injured
- Current redshirt

Roster

== Schedule and results ==
Date time, TV	Rank^{#}	Opponent^{#}	Result	Record	High points	High rebounds	High assists	Site (attendance) city, state
Non-conference regular season
November 6, 2023*; 7:30 p.m., ESPN+		SAGU	W 82–63	1–0	24 – Phelps	10 – T. Smith	5 – Phelps	Moody Coliseum (4,151); Dallas, TX
November 8, 2023*; 6:00 p.m., ESPN+		Western Illinois	W 90–53	2–0	14 – Tied	9 – Tied	9 – Edwards	Moody Coliseum (4,003); Dallas, TX
November 9, 2023*; 7:00 p.m., ESPN+		Lamar	W 78–67	3–0	18 – Harris	10 – Ambrose-Hylton	5 – Tied	Moody Coliseum (4,057); Dallas, TX
November 14, 2023*; 7:00 p.m., ESPN+		No. 13 Texas A&M	L 66–79	3–1	21 – Harris	9 – Williamson	3 – Tied	Moody Coliseum (6,852); Dallas, TX
November 20, 2023*; 5:00 p.m., FS1		vs. West Virginia; Fort Myers Tip-Off semifinals	W 70–58	4–1	17 – Phelps	12 – Phelps	5 – Harris	Suncoast Credit Union Arena (3,500); Fort Myers, FL
November 22, 2023*; 7:30 p.m., FS1		vs. Wisconsin; Fort Myers Tip-Off championship	L 61–69	4–2	19 – Phelps	4 – Tied	3 – Edwards	Suncoast Credit Union Arena (3,500); Fort Myers, FL
November 26, 2023*; 2:00 p.m., ESPN+		Louisiana–Monroe	W 70–57	5–2	21 – Phelps	8 – Williamson	3 – Edwards	Moody Coliseum (4,557); Dallas, TX
November 29, 2023*; 7:00 p.m., ESPN+		Dayton	L 63–65	5–3	15 – Phelps	8 – T. Smith	3 – Harris	Moody Coliseum (4,908); Dallas, TX
December 3, 2023*; 2:00 p.m., ESPN+		Texas A&M–Commerce	W 90–47	6–3	19 – Ambrose-Hylton	6 – T. Smith	7 – Tied	Moody Coliseum (4,672); Dallas, TX
December 6, 2023*; 9:00 p.m., FS1		at Arizona State	L 74–76	6–4	24 – Phelps	9 – Tied	4 – Edwards	Desert Financial Arena (6,812); Tempe, AZ
December 16, 2023*; 7:00 p.m., ACCN		at Florida State	W 68–57	7–4	24 – Harris	10 – T. Smith	4 – Harris	Donald L. Tucker Civic Center (4,301); Tallahassee, FL
December 19, 2023*; 7:00 p.m., ESPN+		Houston Christian	W 89–53	8–4	18 – Williamson	8 – Williamson	5 – Edwards	Moody Coliseum (4,331); Dallas, TX
December 22, 2023*; 5:00 p.m., CBSSN		at Murray State	W 92–65	9–4	16 – Harris	13 – Williamson	5 – Harris	CFSB Center (5,102); Murray, KY
AAC regular season
January 2, 2024; 8:00 p.m., ESPN2		Charlotte	W 66–54	10–4 (1–0)	13 – Phelps	11 – T. Smith	3 – Tied	Moody Coliseum (4,513); Dallas, TX
January 7, 2024; 4:00 p.m., ESPN		at No. 15 Memphis	L 59–62	10–5 (1–1)	12 – T. Smith	7 – Tied	4 – Harris	FedExForum (12,132); Memphis, TN
January 13, 2024; 3:00 p.m., ESPN+		at East Carolina	W 75–64	11–5 (2–1)	17 – Phelps	8 – Williamson	8 – Harris	Williams Arena (5,213); Greenville, NC
January 16, 2024; 7:00 p.m., ESPN+		Temple	W 77–64	12–5 (3–1)	18 – Harris	12 – Williamson	6 – Edwards	Moody Coliseum (5,018); Dallas, TX
January 20, 2024; 2:00 p.m., ESPN+		Tulsa	W 103–70	13–5 (4–1)	18 – Tied	10 – Williamson	10 – Harris	Moody Coliseum (5,772); Dallas, TX
January 25, 2024; 6:00 p.m., ESPN2		at North Texas	L 66–68	13–6 (4–2)	22 – Phelps	12 – Williamson	4 – Harris	The Super Pit (7,239); Denton, TX
January 28, 2024; 2:00 p.m., ESPN2		at Wichita State	L 72–77	13–7 (4–3)	15 – Harris	8 – T. Smith	5 – Phelps	Charles Koch Arena (4,373); Wichita, KS
February 1, 2024; 6:00 p.m., ESPN2		Tulane	W 80–76	14–7 (5–3)	16 – T. Smith	13 – Williamson	5 – Phelps	Moody Coliseum (5,284); Dallas, TX
February 4, 2024; 5:00 p.m., ESPN2		UAB	W 72–69	15–7 (6–3)	14 – Tied	6 – Williamson	5 – Tied	Moody Coliseum (5,656); Dallas, TX
February 7, 2024; 7:00 p.m., ESPN+		at Rice	W 95–69	16–7 (7–3)	16 – Phelps	8 – Williamson	6 – Tied	Tudor Fieldhouse (1,934); Houston, TX
February 11, 2024; 1:00 p.m., ESPNU		North Texas	W 71–68	17–7 (8–3)	14 – Tied	12 – Williamson	3 – Phelps	Moody Coliseum (5,742); Dallas, TX
February 15, 2024; 6:00 p.m., ESPN+		at Tulane	W 87–79	18–7 (9–3)	25 – Harris	7 – Tied	6 – Harris	Devlin Fieldhouse (1,231); New Orleans, LA
February 18, 2024; 3:00 p.m., ESPN		Memphis	W 106–79	19–7 (10–3)	26 – Wright	8 – Williamson	7 – Phelps	Moody Coliseum (6,781); Dallas, TX
February 22, 2024; 6:00 p.m., ESPN2		at Florida Atlantic	L 70–80	19–8 (8–4)	15 – Tied	5 – Tied	3 – Harris	Eleanor R. Baldwin Arena (3,161); Boca Raton, FL
February 25, 2024; 11:00 a.m., ESPN2		at South Florida	L 68–79	19–9 (10–5)	16 – Wright	9 – Phelps	2 – Tied	Yuengling Center (10,251); Tampa, FL
March 2, 2024; 2:00 p.m., ESPN+		UTSA	L 73–77	19–10 (10–6)	18 – Phelps	8 – Williamson	3 – Smith	Moody Coliseum (5,507); Dallas, TX
March 6, 2024; 7:00 p.m., ESPN+		East Carolina	W 80–77 ^{OT}	20–10 (11–6)	16 – Harris	13 – Williamson	3 – Tied	Moody Coliseum (5,471); Dallas, TX
March 10, 2024; 2:00 p.m., ESPN+		at UAB	L 70–74	20–11 (11–7)	18 – Phelps	7 – Hudson	4 – Edwards	Bartow Arena (4,037); Birmingham, AL
AAC tournament
March 14, 2024; 8:00 p.m., ESPNU	(6)	vs. (11) Temple; Second Round	L 60–75	20–12	21 – Miller	6 – Hofman	6 – Miller	Dickies Arena (5,516); Fort Worth, TX
NIT
March 20, 2024; 6:00 p.m., ESPN+		at (1) Indiana State; First Round - Indiana State Bracket	L 92–101	20–13	21 – Phelps	7 – Phelps	4 – Harris	Hulman Center (6,421); Terre Haute, IN
*Non-conference game. ^{#}Rankings from AP Poll. (#) Tournament seedings in parentheses. All times are in Central Time.
