= 2023–24 East Carolina Pirates men's basketball team =

American college basketball season

2023–24 East Carolina Pirates men's basketball
- Conference: American Athletic Conference
- Record: 15–18 (7–11 AAC)
- Head coach: Michael Schwartz (2nd season)
- Assistant coaches: Jake Morton; Riley Davis; Reggie Williams; Mark Adams; Josh Giardina
- Home arena: Williams Arena

2023–24 American Athletic Conference men's basketball standings
	Conf.				Overall
Team	W		L	PCT	W		L	PCT
South Florida	16	–	2	.889	25	–	8	.758
Florida Atlantic	14	–	4	.778	25	–	9	.735
Charlotte	13	–	5	.722	19	–	12	.613
UAB †	12	–	6	.667	23	–	12	.657
Memphis	11	–	7	.611	22	–	10	.688
SMU	11	–	7	.611	20	–	13	.606
North Texas	10	–	8	.556	19	–	15	.559
East Carolina	7	–	11	.389	15	–	18	.455
Tulsa	7	–	11	.389	16	–	15	.516
Tulane	5	–	13	.278	14	–	17	.452
Temple	5	–	13	.278	16	–	20	.444
Wichita State	5	–	13	.278	15	–	19	.441
Rice	5	–	13	.278	11	–	21	.344
UTSA	5	–	13	.278	11	–	21	.344
† 2024 AAC tournament winner

The 2023–24 East Carolina Pirates men's basketball team represented East Carolina University during the 2023–24 NCAA Division I men's basketball season. The Pirates, led by second-year head coach Michael Schwartz, played their home games at Williams Arena at Minges Coliseum in Greenville, North Carolina as ninth-year members of the American Athletic Conference (AAC).

== Previous season ==
The Pirates finished the 2022–23 season 15–16, 6–12 in AAC play, to finish in ninth place. They defeated South Florida in the first round of the AAC tournament, before falling to Houston in the quarterfinals.

== Offseason ==
=== Departures ===
Name	Number	Pos.	Height	Weight	Year	Hometown	Reason for departure
Saxby Sunderland	0	G	6' 3"	170	Freshman	Arlington, VA	Transferred to Longwood
Wynston Tabbs	10	G	6' 2"	195	RS Senior	Suitland, MD	Graduate transferred to Morgan State
Javon Small	12	G	6' 2"	180	Sophomore	South Bend, IN	Transferred to Oklahoma State
David Kasanganay	15	G	6' 2"	180	RS Senior	Charlotte, NC	Walk-on; graduated
Colin McKeenzie	20	G	6' 6"		Freshman	Charleston, SC	Walk-on; transferred
Jaxon Ellingsworth	22	F	6' 9"	205	Freshman	Morehead City, NC	Walk-on; transferred
Ludgy Debaut	24	C	7' 0"	245	RS Senior	Les Abymes, Guadeloupe	Graduated
Elijah Jones	33	F	6' 8"	210	Freshman	Pleasantville, NJ	Transferred to UTEP

=== Incoming transfers ===
Name	Num	Pos.	Height	Weight	Year	Hometown	Previous school
Bobby Pettiford Jr.	0	G	6' 1"	190	Junior	Durham, NC	Kansas
Cam Hayes	13	G	6' 3"	180	Junior	Greensboro, NC	LSU
Grant Smith	35				Sophomore	Richmond, VA	Walk-on; Quincy College

=== 2023 recruiting class ===
College recruiting information
Name	Hometown	School	Height	Weight	Commit date
Cyr Malonga #65 C	Louisville, KY	Evangel Christian School	6 ft 10 in (2.08 m)	220 lb (100 kg)	Sep 12, 2022
Cyr Malonga #65 C	Recruit ratings: 247Sports: ESPN: (79)				
Ta'Korrie Faison; SF	Goldsboro, NC	Goldsboro High School	6 ft 6 in (1.98 m)	220 lb (100 kg)	Jan 30, 2023
Ta'Korrie Faison; SF	Recruit ratings: 247Sports: ESPN: (0)				
Callum Richard; C	Gastonia, NC	Gaston Day School Inc	6 ft 11 in (2.11 m)	228 lb (103 kg)	Apr 24, 2023
Callum Richard; C	Recruit ratings: 247Sports: ESPN: (0)				
Overall recruit ranking:
Note: In many cases, Scout, Rivals, 247Sports, On3, and ESPN may conflict in their listings of height and weight.; In these cases, the average was taken. ESPN grades are on a 100-point scale.; Sources: "East Carolina 2023 Basketball Commitments". Rivals.; "2023 East Carolina Pirates Recruiting Class". ESPN.; "2023 Team Ranking". Rivals.; "2023 East Carolina Pirates Basketball 24/7 Sports Commits". 247Sports.

=== 2024 recruiting class ===
College recruiting information (2024)
Name	Hometown	School	Height	Weight	Commit date
Jordan Vick #60 PG	Bailey, NC	Southern Nash High School	6 ft 10 in (2.08 m)	220 lb (100 kg)	Sep 25, 2022
Jordan Vick #60 PG	Recruit ratings: 247Sports: ESPN: (79)				
Overall recruit ranking:
Note: In many cases, Scout, Rivals, 247Sports, On3, and ESPN may conflict in their listings of height and weight.; In these cases, the average was taken. ESPN grades are on a 100-point scale.; Sources: "East Carolina 2024 Basketball Commitments". Rivals.; "2024 East Carolina Pirates Recruiting Class". ESPN.; "2024 Team Ranking". Rivals.; "2024 East Carolina Pirates Basketball 24/7 Sports Commits". 247Sports.

== Roster ==
2023–24 East Carolina Pirates men's basketball team
Players
Coaches

Pos.	#	Name	Height	Weight	Year	Previous school	Hometown
G	0	Bobby Pettiford Jr.	6 ft 0 in (1.83 m)	196 lb (89 kg)	Jr	Kansas	Durham, NC
G	1	Kalib LaCount	5 ft 8 in (1.73 m)	148 lb (67 kg)	So	King/Drew High School	Los Angeles, CA
F	2	Ezra Ausar	6 ft 8 in (2.03 m)	247 lb (112 kg)	So	Liberty Heights Athletic Institute	Atlanta, GA
G	3	RJ Felton	6 ft 3 in (1.91 m)	209 lb (95 kg)	Jr	Aiken High School	Aiken, SC
G	5	Logan Bourgeois	6 ft 1 in (1.85 m)	154 lb (70 kg)	Fr	CJF Fleury-Les-Aubrais	Fleury-les-Aubrais, France
F	6	Brandon Johnson	6 ft 8 in (2.03 m)	222 lb (101 kg)	RS Jr	Brunswick Community College	Raleigh, NC
G	7	Quentin Diboundje	6 ft 5 in (1.96 m)	221 lb (100 kg)	Jr	Tennessee	Montpellier, France
G	8	Cam Hayes	6 ft 2 in (1.88 m)	192 lb (87 kg)	Jr	LSU	Greensboro, NC
G	10	Evan Montanari (W)	6 ft 2 in (1.88 m)	173 lb (78 kg)	Fr	Gaston Day School	Denver, NC
F	11	Valentino Pinedo	6 ft 7 in (2.01 m)	228 lb (103 kg)	So	Sunrise Christian Academy	Madrid, Spain
G	21	Jaden Walker	6 ft 5 in (1.96 m)	200 lb (91 kg)	Jr	Iowa State	Lawrenceville, GA
G/F	23	Ta'Korrie Faison	6 ft 5 in (1.96 m)	224 lb (102 kg)	Fr	Goldsboro High School	Goldsboro, NC
G	25	Benjamin Bayela	6 ft 6 in (1.98 m)	200 lb (91 kg)	Sr	South Plains College	Le Chesnay-Rocquencourt, France
C	32	Cyr Malonga	6 ft 11 in (2.11 m)	235 lb (107 kg)	Fr	Evangel Christian School	Pointe-Noire, Republic of the Congo
F	35	Grant Smith (W)	6 ft 7 in (2.01 m)	200 lb (91 kg)	So	Quincy College	Richmond, VA
C	50	Callum Richard	6 ft 10 in (2.08 m)	237 lb (108 kg)	Fr	Gaston Day School	Stanley, NC

Head coach

- Michael Schwartz (Texas)

Assistant coach(es)

- Jake Morton (Miami (FL))
- Nick Matson (VMI)
- Reggie Williams (VMI)
- Mark Adams (Texas Tech)
- Josh Giardina (Marymount)

Legend

- (C) Team captain
- (S) Suspended
- (I) Ineligible
- (W) Walk-on
- Injured
- Current redshirt

Roster
Last update: December 10, 2023

== Schedule and results ==
Date time, TV	Rank^{#}	Opponent^{#}	Result	Record	High points	High rebounds	High assists	Site (attendance) city, state
Non-conference regular season
November 6, 2023*; 7:00 p.m., ESPN+		Ferrum	W 91–61	1–0	29 – Johnson	9 – Johnson	6 – LaCount	Williams Arena (4,529); Greenville, NC
November 11, 2023*; 4:00 p.m., ESPN+		Campbell	W 77–63	2–0	30 – Felton	11 – Felton	7 – Pettiford Jr.	Williams Arena (4,621); Greenville, NC
November 15, 2023*; 7:00 p.m., ESPN+		USC Upstate	L 81–83	2–1	33 – Felton	9 – Felton	4 – Pettiford Jr.	Williams Arena (4,585); Greenville, NC
November 19, 2023*; 2:00 p.m., ESPN+		Northeastern; TowneBank Holiday Classic	L 76–82	2–2	18 – Ausar	6 – Felton	6 – Pettiford Jr.	Williams Arena (3,673); Greenville, NC
November 20, 2023*; 6:00 p.m., ESPN+		Georgia Southern; TowneBank Holiday Classic	W 82–64	3–2	27 – Diboundje	10 – Johnson	7 – LaCount	Williams Arena (3,536); Greenville, NC
November 21, 2023*; 6:00 p.m., ESPN+		Kennesaw State; TowneBank Holiday Classic	W 85–84	4–2	19 – Felton	11 – Walker	3 – tied	Williams Arena (3,311); Greenville, NC
November 25, 2023*; 2:00 p.m., ESPN+		at George Mason	L 59–81	4–3	13 – tied	7 – Johnson	3 – Pettiford Jr.	EagleBank Arena (3,268); Fairfax, VA
November 30, 2023*; 7:00 p.m., ESPN+		UNC Wilmington	W 74–66	5–3	24 – Pettiford Jr.	11 – Johnson	2 – tied	Williams Arena (5,182); Greenville, NC
December 4, 2023*; 4:00 p.m., ESPN+		Maryland Eastern Shore	W 63–52	6–3	18 – Ausar	10 – tied	4 – Pettiford Jr.	Williams Arena (3,625); Greenville, NC
December 9, 2023*; 12:00 p.m., ESPNU		South Carolina	L 62–68	6–4	15 – Felton	8 – Johnson	3 – Walker	Williams Arena (5,568); Greenville, NC
December 14, 2023*; 7:00 p.m., SECN		vs. Florida; Florida Tipoff	L 65–70	6–5	14 – tied	10 – Johnson	4 – Pettiford Jr.	RP Funding Center; Lakeland, FL
December 20, 2023*; 7:00 p.m., ESPN+		Delaware State	W 79–50	7–5	26 – Felton	15 – Johnson	4 – tied	Williams Arena (3,878); Greenville, NC
December 29, 2023*; 7:00 p.m., ESPN+		East Tennessee State	L 70–86	7–6	19 – Johnson	9 – Johnson	2 – tied	Williams Arena (4,259); Greenville, NC
AAC regular season
January 2, 2024; 7:00 p.m., ESPN2		at No. 17 Florida Atlantic	L 64–79	7–7 (0–1)	15 – Johnson	10 – Johnson	2 – tied	Eleanor R. Baldwin Arena (3,161); Boca Raton, FL
January 7, 2024; 3:00 p.m., ESPNU		Tulsa	W 62–57	8–7 (1–1)	17 – Johnson	9 – Johnson	6 – Pettiford Jr.	Williams Arena (4,454); Greenville, NC
January 10, 2024; 7:00 p.m., ESPN+		at Temple	W 73–62	9–7 (2–1)	20 – Felton	9 – Johnson	6 – Pettiford Jr.	Liacouras Center (2,003); Philadelphia, PA
January 13, 2024; 4:00 p.m., ESPN+		SMU	L 64–75	9–8 (2–2)	25 – Ausar	8 – Ausar	1 – tied	Williams Arena (5,213); Greenville, NC
January 17, 2024; 7:00 p.m., ESPN+		North Texas	L 59–60	9–9 (2–3)	16 – Felton	8 – Johnson	6 – Pettiford Jr.	Williams Arena (4,287); Greenville, NC
January 20, 2024; 3:00 p.m., ESPN+		at UAB	L 61–69	9–10 (2–4)	16 – Ausar	10 – tied	4 – Pettiford Jr.	Bartow Arena (3,872); Birmingham, AL
January 24, 2024; 7:30 p.m., ESPN+		at Wichita State	W 54–52	10–10 (3–4)	12 – Johnson	7 – Johnson	2 – Hayes	Charles Koch Arena (5,252); Wichita, KS
January 28, 2024; 5:00 p.m., ESPN2		Temple	W 70–64 ^{OT}	11–10 (4–4)	24 – Felton	11 – Felton	2 – tied	Williams Arena (4,132); Greenville, NC
January 31, 2024; 7:00 p.m., ESPN+		South Florida	L 60–71	11–11 (4–5)	14 – Hayes	6 – Johnson	4 – Pettiford Jr.	Williams Arena (4,053); Greenville, NC
February 3, 2024; 2:00 p.m., ESPNU		at Charlotte	L 52–67	11–12 (4–6)	20 – Felton	5 – tied	3 – Hayes	Dale F. Halton Arena (8,201); Charlotte, NC
February 10, 2024; 4:00 p.m., ESPNU		at UTSA	W 84–73	12–12 (5–6)	30 – Johnson	9 – Johnson	13 – Walker	Convocation Center (1,535); San Antonio, TX
February 15, 2024; 7:00 p.m., ESPN+		Wichita State	W 68–55	13–12 (6–6)	21 – tied	10 – Johnson	5 – Hayes	Williams Arena (3,940); Greenville, NC
February 18, 2024; 2:00 p.m., ESPN+		Tulane	W 81–67	14–12 (7–6)	21 – Felton	9 – Johnson	8 – Walker	Williams Arena (4,725); Greenville, NC
February 24, 2024; 2:00 p.m., ESPNU		at Rice	L 52–70	14–13 (7–7)	15 – Felton	7 – Johnson	2 – tied	Tudor Fieldhouse (3,808); Houston, TX
February 29, 2024; 7:00 p.m., ESPN2		Memphis	L 58–82	14–14 (7–8)	19 – Felton	9 – Felton	4 – Hayes	Williams Arena (4,934); Greenville, NC
March 3, 2024; 3:00 p.m., ESPN+		at North Texas	L 69–84	14–15 (7–9)	14 – tied	8 – Johnson	2 – tied	The Super Pit (4,241); Denton, TX
March 6, 2024; 8:00 p.m., ESPN+		at SMU	L 77–80 ^{OT}	14–16 (7–10)	28 – Felton	11 – Johnson	6 – Pettiford Jr.	Moody Coliseum (5,471); Dallas, TX
March 9, 2024; 4:00 p.m., ESPN+		Charlotte	L 72–82	14–17 (7–11)	28 – Felton	7 – Walker	7 – Walker	Williams Arena (4,548); Greenville, NC
AAC tournament
March 14, 2024; 12:30 p.m., ESPNU	(8)	vs. (9) Tulsa; Second round	W 84–79	15–17	28 – Ausar	13 – Johnson	8 – Hayes	Dickies Arena; Fort Worth, TX
March 15, 2024; 1:00 p.m., ESPN2	(8)	vs. (1) South Florida; Quarterfinals	L 59–81	15–18	16 – Felton	10 – Johnson	3 – Ausar	Dickies Arena; Fort Worth, TX
*Non-conference game. ^{#}Rankings from AP poll. (#) Tournament seedings in parentheses. All times are in Eastern.
