= 2023–24 Temple Owls men's basketball team =

American college basketball season

2023–24 Temple Owls men's basketball
- Conference: American Athletic Conference
- Record: 16–20 (5–13 AAC)
- Head coach: Adam Fisher (1st season)
- Associate head coach: Michael Huger
- Assistant coaches: Chris Clark; Bobby Jordan
- Home arena: Liacouras Center

2023–24 American Athletic Conference men's basketball standings
	Conf.				Overall
Team	W		L	PCT	W		L	PCT
South Florida	16	–	2	.889	25	–	8	.758
Florida Atlantic	14	–	4	.778	25	–	9	.735
Charlotte	13	–	5	.722	19	–	12	.613
UAB †	12	–	6	.667	23	–	12	.657
Memphis	11	–	7	.611	22	–	10	.688
SMU	11	–	7	.611	20	–	13	.606
North Texas	10	–	8	.556	19	–	15	.559
East Carolina	7	–	11	.389	15	–	18	.455
Tulsa	7	–	11	.389	16	–	15	.516
Tulane	5	–	13	.278	14	–	17	.452
Temple	5	–	13	.278	16	–	20	.444
Wichita State	5	–	13	.278	15	–	19	.441
Rice	5	–	13	.278	11	–	21	.344
UTSA	5	–	13	.278	11	–	21	.344
† 2024 AAC tournament winner

The 2023–24 Temple Owls men's basketball team represented Temple University during the 2023–24 NCAA Division I men's basketball season. The Owls, led by first-year head coach Adam Fisher, played their home games at the Liacouras Center in Philadelphia, Pennsylvania as a member of the American Athletic Conference.

They finished the regular season at 12–19, 5–13 in AAC to finish in eleventh place. Despite their low seeding, Temple improbably won four games in four days to reach the AAC Tournament Final. They lost to UAB, finishing with a record of 16-20. In the end, a once lost season quickly turned into a successful rebuilding year.

== Previous season ==
The Owls finished the 2022–23 season 16–16, 10–8 in AAC Play to finish in 5th place. They lost in the quarterfinals of the AAC Tournament to Cincinnati.

== Offseason ==
=== Departures ===
Name	Number	Pos.	Height	Weight	Year	Hometown	Reason for departure
Khalif Battle	0	G	6'5"	175	RS junior	Hillside, NJ	Transferred to Arkansas
Damian Dunn	1	G	6'5"	195	RS junior	Kinston, NC	Transferred to Houston
Jamille Reynolds	4	F	6'10"	285	Sophomore	St. Petersburg, FL	Transferred to Cincinnati
Nick Jourdain	11	F	6'8"	205	Sophomore	Clifton, NJ	Transferred to Memphis
Kur Jongkuch	15	F	6'9"	220	Senior	Ontario, Canada	Graduated
Zach Hicks	24	F	6'8"	195	Sophomore	Camden, NJ	Transferred to Penn State
Ryan Sayers	32	G	6'1"	175	Senior	Pottstown, PA	Walk-on; left the team for personal reasons

=== Incoming transfers ===
Name	Num	Pos.	Height	Weight	Year	Hometown	Previous school
Quante Berry	0	G	6'4"	175	Sophomore	Cleveland, TN	Providence
Jordan Riley	4	G	6'4"	195	Junior	Brentwood, NY	Georgetown
Steve Settle III	14	F	6'10"	180	RS junior	Glenarden, MD	Howard
Sam Hofman	33	F	6'5"	279	Senior	Brussels, Belgium	Houston Christian
Matteo Picarelli	34	G	6'2'	185	Senior	Milan, Italy	UMBC

=== Recruiting classes ===
==== 2023 recruiting class ====
College recruiting
Name	Hometown	School	Height	Weight	Commit date
Zion Stanford; SF	Philadelphia, PA	West Catholic Prep High School	6 ft 5 in (1.96 m)	195 lb (88 kg)	Sep 19, 2022
Zion Stanford; SF	Recruit ratings: Rivals: 247Sports: (0)				
Overall recruit ranking: 247Sports: 80
Note: In many cases, Scout, Rivals, 247Sports, On3, and ESPN may conflict in their listings of height and weight.; In these cases, the average was taken. ESPN grades are on a 100-point scale.; Sources: "2023 Team Ranking". Rivals.

== Roster ==
2023–24 Temple Owls men's basketball team
Players
Coaches

Pos.	#	Name	Height	Weight	Year	Previous school	Hometown
G	0	Quante Berry	6 ft 4 in (1.93 m)	175 lb (79 kg)	Fr	Winston Salem Christian School (TN); Providence	Cleveland, TN
G	1	Zion Stanford	6 ft 5 in (1.96 m)	195 lb (88 kg)	Fr	West Catholic Prep High School	Philadelphia, PA
G	2	Jahlil White	6 ft 7 in (2.01 m)	210 lb (95 kg)	RS Jr	Wildwood Catholic High School	Whitesboro, NJ
G	3	Hysier Miller	6 ft 1 in (1.85 m)	190 lb (86 kg)	Jr	Neumann Goretti High School	Philadelphia, PA
G	4	Jordan Riley	6 ft 4 in (1.93 m)	200 lb (91 kg)	Jr	Brentwood High School; Georgetown	Brentwood, NY
F	10	Taj Thweatt	6 ft 7 in (2.01 m)	225 lb (102 kg)	RS Jr	Wildwood Catholic Academy; Coastal Carolina	Wildwood, NJ
G	13	Connor Gal (W)	6 ft 4 in (1.93 m)	185 lb (84 kg)	So	Great Valley High School	Malvern, PA
F	14	Steve Settle III	6 ft 10 in (2.08 m)	180 lb (82 kg)	RS Jr	DeMatha Catholic High School; Howard	Glenarden, MD
C	21	Emmanuel Okpomo	6 ft 9 in (2.06 m)	225 lb (102 kg)	Jr	Oak Hill Academy; Wake Forest	Delta State, Nigeria
G	22	Deuce Roberts	6 ft 6 in (1.98 m)	200 lb (91 kg)	So	Saint Michael the Archangel Catholic	Kansas City, MO
G	25	AK Fihla (W)	6 ft 2 in (1.88 m)	170 lb (77 kg)	So	St David's Marist	Johannesburg, South Africa
F	33	Sam Hofman	6 ft 5 in (1.96 m)	280 lb (127 kg)	GS	Stedelijk Lyceum Topsport; Houston Christian	Brussels, Belgium
G	34	Matteo Picarelli	6 ft 2 in (1.88 m)	185 lb (84 kg)	Jr	Inter-Community School Zürich; UMBC	Milan, Italy
G	55	Shane Dezonie	6 ft 5 in (1.96 m)	210 lb (95 kg)	Jr	Brewster Academy; Vanderbilt	Tobyhanna, PA

Head coach

- Adam Fisher (Penn State)

Assistant coach(es)

- Michael Huger (Bowling Green)
- Chris Clark (Temple)
- Bobby Jordan (Drexel)

Legend

- (C) Team captain
- (S) Suspended
- (I) Ineligible
- (W) Walk-on
- Injured
- Current redshirt

Roster

== Schedule and results ==
Date time, TV	Rank^{#}	Opponent^{#}	Result	Record	High points	High rebounds	High assists	Site (attendance) city, state
Non-conference regular season
November 6, 2023*; 7:00 p.m., ESPN+		Maryland Eastern Shore	W 85–65	1–0	17 – Miller	14 – White	5 – Miller	Liacouras Center (4,601); Philadelphia, PA
November 10, 2023*; 8:30 p.m., CBSSN		at Navy; Veterans Classic	W 75–68	2–0	18 – White	10 – White	3 – White	Alumni Hall (2,340); Annapolis, MD
November 14, 2023*; 7:00 p.m., NBCSPHI		at Drexel; Big 5 Classic Pod 1	W 66–64	3–0	19 – Miller	7 – Hofman	4 – Miller	Daskalakis Athletic Center (2,509); Philadelphia, PA
November 18, 2023*; 2:00 p.m., ESPN+		Columbia	L 73–78	3–1	29 – Miller	8 – Hofman	6 – Miller	Liacouras Center (2,957); Philadelphia, PA
November 22, 2023*; 3:30 p.m., ESPN+		Ole Miss	L 76–77	3–2	21 – Miller	7 – Stanford	5 – Hofman	Liacouras Center (2,334); Philadelphia, PA
November 29, 2023*; 7:00 p.m., ESPN+		La Salle; Big 5 Classic Pod 1	W 106–99 ^{3OT}	4–2	20 – Miller	16 – Settle III	3 – Tied	Liacouras Center (4,229); Philadelphia, PA
December 2, 2023*; 7:30 p.m., NBCSPHI+/Peacock		vs. Saint Joseph’s; Big 5 Classic championship game	L 65–74	4–3	20 – Riley	9 – Stanford	4 – Miller	Wells Fargo Center (15,215); Philadelphia, PA
December 6, 2023*; 7:00 p.m., ESPN+		Bloomsburg	W 85–55	5–3	16 – Riley	8 – Tied	7 – Miller	Liacouras Center (2,463); Philadelphia, PA
December 10, 2023*; 7:00 p.m., YES		vs. Albany; NABC Brooklyn Showcase	W 78–73	6–3	28 – Miller	12 – Hofman	4 – Miller	Barclays Center; Brooklyn, NY
December 16, 2023*; 2:00 p.m., ESPN+/MASN		at VCU	L 78–87	6–4	17 – Hofman	11 – White	9 – Miller	Siegel Center (7,189); Richmond, VA
December 21, 2023*; 3:00 p.m., ESPNU		vs. Nevada; Diamond Head Classic Quarterfinals	L 56–80	6–5	18 – Miller	5 – Tied	2 – Miller	Stan Sheriff Center (4,927); Honolulu, HI
December 22, 2023*; 7:30 p.m., ESPN+		vs. Old Dominion; Diamond Head Classic Consolation Round	L 63–78	6–6	20 – Miller	9 – Hofman	5 – Miller	Stan Sheriff Center (5,077); Honolulu, HI
December 24, 2023*; 1:30 p.m., ESPN2		vs. Portland; Diamond Head Classic 7th Place Game	W 55–54	7–6	16 – Settle	12 – Riley	3 – Tied	Stan Sheriff Center (4,342); Honolulu, HI
AAC regular season
January 4, 2024; 7:00 p.m., ESPN+		at South Florida	L 68–76	7–7 (0–1)	21 – Riley	9 – Settle	4 – Miller	Yuengling Center (3,388); Tampa, FL
January 7, 2024; 1:00 p.m., ESPNU		Wichita State	W 68–61	8–7 (1–1)	17 – Tied	9 – Tied	8 – Miller	Liacouras Center (3,247); Philadelphia, PA
January 10, 2024; 7:00 p.m., ESPN+		East Carolina	L 62–73	8–8 (1–2)	15 – Riley	7 – White	3 – Miller	Liacouras Center (2,003); Philadelphia, PA
January 13, 2024; 6:00 p.m., ESPNU		at North Texas	L 51–69	8–9 (1–3)	13 – Riley	7 – Tied	3 – Miller	The Super Pit (3,310); Denton, TX
January 16, 2024; 8:00 p.m., ESPN+		at SMU	L 64–77	8–10 (1–4)	14 – Tied	9 – White	4 – Miller	Moody Coliseum (5,018); Dallas, TX
January 20, 2024; 2:00 p.m., ESPN+		Rice	L 66–69	8–11 (1–5)	24 – Miller	8 – Riley	7 – Miller	Liacouras Center (4,007); Philadelphia, PA
January 24, 2024; 7:00 p.m., ESPN+		South Florida	L 69–75	8–12 (1–6)	23 – Picarelli	7 – Tied	6 – White	Liacouras Center (3,505); Philadelphia, PA
January 28, 2024; 5:00 p.m., ESPN2		at East Carolina	L 64–70 ^{OT}	8–13 (1–7)	20 – Riley	9 – Dezonie	2 – Tied	Williams Arena (4,132); Greenville, NC
February 4, 2024; 4:00 p.m., ESPNU		at Tulane	L 80–92 ^{OT}	8–14 (1–8)	23 – Riley	15 – White	4 – White	Devlin Fieldhouse (1,950); New Orleans, LA
February 8, 2024; 7:00 p.m., ESPN2		Memphis	L 77–84	8–15 (1–9)	20 – White	10 – Dezonie	4 – Stanford	Liacouras Center (4,888); Philadelphia, PA
February 11, 2024; 2:00 p.m., ESPN+		Charlotte	L 70–73	8–16 (1–10)	14 – Miller	6 – Riley	4 – Berry	Liacouras Center (2,602); Philadelphia, PA
February 15, 2024; 7:00 p.m., ESPN2		at No. 24 Florida Atlantic	L 68–80	8–17 (1–11)	19 – Riley	7 – White	5 – Miller	Eleanor R. Baldwin Arena (3,161); Boca Raton, FL
February 18, 2024; 2:00 p.m., ESPN+		UTSA	W 83–77	9–17 (2–11)	20 – Miller	7 – Tied	4 – Miller	Liacouras Center (4,482); Philadelphia, PA
February 25, 2024; 4:00 p.m., ESPN		at Wichita State	W 72–66 ^{OT}	10–17 (3–11)	15 – Riley	11 – Tied	1 – Tied	Charles Koch Arena (7,019); Wichita, KS
February 28, 2024; 8:00 p.m., ESPN+		at Rice	W 65–43	11–17 (4–11)	16 – Miller	9 – Hofman	4 – Miller	Tudor Fieldhouse (2,456); Houston, TX
March 2, 2024; 2:00 p.m., ESPN+		Tulsa	L 67–72	11–18 (4–12)	19 – Miller	8 – Settle	4 – Miller	Liacouras Center (3,213); Philadelphia, PA
March 7, 2024; 7:00 p.m., ESPN2		UAB	L 72–100	11–19 (4–13)	20 – Stanford	5 – White	3 – Hofman	Liacouras Center (2,515); Philadelphia, PA
March 10, 2024; 3:00 p.m., ESPN+		at UTSA	W 84–82	12–19 (5–13)	16 – Tied	6 – Tied	6 – Miller	Convocation Center (1,096); San Antonio, TX
AAC Tournament
March 13, 2024; 3:00 p.m., ESPN+	(11)	vs. (14) UTSA; First round	W 64–61	13–19	19 – Stanford	7 – Tied	5 – Miller	Dickies Arena; Fort Worth, TX
March 14, 2024; 9:00 p.m., ESPNU	(11)	vs. (6) SMU; Second round	W 75–60	14–19	21 – Miller	6 – Hofman	6 – Miller	Dickies Arena (5,516); Fort Worth, TX
March 15, 2024; 9:00 p.m., ESPNU	(11)	vs. (3) Charlotte; Quarterfinals	W 58–54	15–19	14 – Settle III	10 – Riley	4 – Miller	Dickies Arena (5,471); Fort Worth, TX
March 16, 2024; 5:30 p.m., ESPN2	(11)	vs. (2) Florida Atlantic; Semifinals	W 74–73	16–19	21 – Miller	10 – Riley	2 – Tied	Dickies Arena (5,545); Fort Worth, TX
March 17, 2024; 3:15 p.m., ESPN	(11)	vs. (4) UAB; Championship	L 69–85	16–20	32 – Miller	11 – Hoffman	6 – Miller	Dickies Arena (5,695); Fort Worth, TX
*Non-conference game. ^{#}Rankings from AP Poll. (#) Tournament seedings in parentheses. All times are in Eastern Time.
