= 2024 American Athletic Conference men's basketball tournament =

Postseason college basketball tournament

- Classification: Division I
- Season: 2023–24
- Teams: 14
- Site: Dickies Arena; Fort Worth, Texas
- Champions: UAB (1st title)
- Winning coach: Andy Kennedy (1st title)
- MVP: Yaxel Lendeborg (UAB)
- Attendance: 33,211 (total); 5,695 (championship)
- Television: ESPN+, ESPNU, ESPN2, & ESPN

2023–24 American Athletic Conference men's basketball standings
	Conf.				Overall
Team	W		L	PCT	W		L	PCT
South Florida	16	–	2	.889	25	–	8	.758
Florida Atlantic	14	–	4	.778	25	–	9	.735
Charlotte	13	–	5	.722	19	–	12	.613
UAB †	12	–	6	.667	23	–	12	.657
Memphis	11	–	7	.611	22	–	10	.688
SMU	11	–	7	.611	20	–	13	.606
North Texas	10	–	8	.556	19	–	15	.559
East Carolina	7	–	11	.389	15	–	18	.455
Tulsa	7	–	11	.389	16	–	15	.516
Tulane	5	–	13	.278	14	–	17	.452
Temple	5	–	13	.278	16	–	20	.444
Wichita State	5	–	13	.278	15	–	19	.441
Rice	5	–	13	.278	11	–	21	.344
UTSA	5	–	13	.278	11	–	21	.344
† 2024 AAC tournament winner

The 2024 American Athletic Conference men's basketball tournament was held March 13–17, 2024, at Dickies Arena in Fort Worth, Texas. The winner of the tournament, the UAB Blazers, received the conference's automatic bid to the 2024 NCAA tournament.

== Seeds ==
Teams were seeded by conference record. The top four teams received byes to the quarterfinals.

Tiebreakers were applied as needed to properly seed the teams.

Seed	School	Conference record	Tiebreaker #1	Tiebreaker #2
1	South Florida	16–2		
2	Florida Atlantic	14–4		
3	Charlotte	13–5		
4	UAB	12–6		
5	Memphis	11–7	1–1 vs. FAU	
6	SMU	11–7	0–1 vs. FAU	
7	North Texas	10–8		
8	East Carolina	7–11	1–0 vs. Tulsa	
9	Tulsa	7–11	0–1 vs. East Carolina	
10	Tulane	5–13	3–1 vs. Other 5–13 Teams	
11	Temple	5–13	5–2 vs. Other 5–13 Teams	
12	Wichita State	5–13	2–3 vs. Other 5–13 Teams	
13	Rice	5–13	2–4 vs. Other 5–13 Teams	1–0 vs. UAB
14	UTSA	5–13	2–4 vs. Other 5–13 Teams	0–1 vs. UAB

== Schedule ==
Game	Time	Matchup	Score	Television	Attendance
First round – March 13, 2024
1	12:00 pm	No. 13 Rice vs. No. 12 Wichita State	81−88	ESPN+	—
2	2:00 pm	No. 14 UTSA vs. No. 11 Temple	61−64	ESPN+	—
Second round – March 14, 2024
3	11:30 am	No. 9 Tulsa vs. No. 8 East Carolina	79−84	ESPNU	5,530
4	1:30 pm	No. 12 Wichita State vs. No. 5 Memphis	71−65	ESPNU	5,530
5	6:00 pm	No. 10 Tulane vs. No. 7 North Texas	71–81	ESPNU	5,516
6	8:00 pm	No. 11 Temple vs. No. 6 SMU	75–60	ESPNU	5,516
Quarterfinals – March 15, 2024
7	12:00 pm	No. 8 East Carolina vs. No. 1 South Florida	81−59	ESPN2	5,454
8	2:00 pm	No. 12 Wichita State vs. No. 4 UAB	72−60	ESPN2	5,454
9	6:00 pm	No. 7 North Texas vs. No. 2 Florida Atlantic	71−77	ESPNU	5,471
10	8:00 pm	No. 11 Temple vs. No. 3 Charlotte	58−54	ESPNU	5,471
Semifinals – March 16, 2024
11	2:00 pm	No. 4 UAB vs No. 1 South Florida	93−83	ESPN2	5,545
12	4:00 pm	No. 11 Temple vs No. 2 Florida Atlantic	74−73	ESPN2	5,545
Championship – March 17, 2024
13	2:15 pm	No. 4 UAB vs No. 11 Temple	85−69	ESPN	5,695
*Game times in CT. ()-Rankings denote tournament seeding.

== Bracket ==
First round Wednesday, March 13
12	Wichita State	88
13	Rice	81
11	Temple	64
14	UTSA	61

Second round Thursday, March 14
8	East Carolina	84
9	Tulsa	79
5	Memphis	65
12	Wichita State	71
7	North Texas	81
10	Tulane	71
6	SMU	60
11	Temple	75

Quarterfinals; Friday, March 15
1	South Florida	81
8	East Carolina	59
4	UAB	72
12	Wichita State	60
2	Florida Atlantic	77
7	North Texas	71
3	Charlotte	54
11	Temple	58

Semifinals; Saturday, March 16
1	South Florida	83
4	UAB	93
2	Florida Atlantic	73
11	Temple	74

Championship; Sunday, March 17
4	UAB	85
11	Temple	69

== See also ==
- 2024 American Athletic Conference women's basketball tournament
- American Athletic Conference men's basketball tournament
- American Athletic Conference
