= 2023–24 Wichita State Shockers men's basketball team =

American college basketball season

2023–24 Wichita State Shockers men's basketball
- Conference: American Athletic Conference
- Record: 15–19 (5–13 AAC)
- Head coach: Paul Mills (1st season)
- Associate head coach: Kenton Paulino
- Assistant coaches: T.J. Cleveland; Quincy Acy
- Home arena: Charles Koch Arena

2023–24 American Athletic Conference men's basketball standings
	Conf.				Overall
Team	W		L	PCT	W		L	PCT
South Florida	16	–	2	.889	25	–	8	.758
Florida Atlantic	14	–	4	.778	25	–	9	.735
Charlotte	13	–	5	.722	19	–	12	.613
UAB †	12	–	6	.667	23	–	12	.657
Memphis	11	–	7	.611	22	–	10	.688
SMU	11	–	7	.611	20	–	13	.606
North Texas	10	–	8	.556	19	–	15	.559
East Carolina	7	–	11	.389	15	–	18	.455
Tulsa	7	–	11	.389	16	–	15	.516
Tulane	5	–	13	.278	14	–	17	.452
Temple	5	–	13	.278	16	–	20	.444
Wichita State	5	–	13	.278	15	–	19	.441
Rice	5	–	13	.278	11	–	21	.344
UTSA	5	–	13	.278	11	–	21	.344
† 2024 AAC tournament winner

The 2023–24 Wichita State Shockers men's basketball team represented Wichita State University in the 2023–24 NCAA Division I men's basketball season. The Shockers, led by first year head coach Paul Mills, played their home games at Charles Koch Arena in Wichita, Kansas as members of the American Athletic Conference.

== Previous season ==
The Shockers finished the 2022–23 season 17–15, 9–9 in AAC play to finish in sixth place. They won in the first round of the AAC tournament against Tulsa 81–63, but lost in the quarterfinals to Tulane 82–76. They were not invited to the NCAA Tournament.

After the season ended, the Shockers fired their head coach Isaac Brown after three seasons.

== Offseason ==
=== Departures ===
Departures
Name	Number	Pos.	Height	Weight	Year	Hometown	Reason
Craig Porter Jr.	3	G	6'2"	185	Senior	Terre Haute, IN	Graduated
Jaron Pierre Jr.	5	G	6'5"	188	Freshman	New Orleans, LA	Entered the Transfer Portal
Jaykwon Walton	10	G	6'7"	206	RS-Junior	Columbus, GA	Transferred to UCF
Melvion Flanagan	12	G	5'10"	152	Sophomore	Alexandria, LA	Entered the Transfer Portal
Shammah Scott	22	G	6'2"	180	RS-Sophomore	Cleveland, OH	Transferred to Akron
Gus Okafor	23	F	6'6"	236	Senior	Baltimore, MD	Graduated
James Rojas	33	F	6'8"	223	RS-Senior	Jamestown, NY	Graduated
Isaiah Poor Bear-Chandler	44	F	6'9"	250	RS-Senior	Omaha, NE	Graduated

=== Incoming transfers ===
Incoming transfers
Name	Number	Pos.	Height	Weight	Year	Hometown	Previous School
Ronnie DeGray III	3	F	6'6"	-	Junior	Parker, CO	Missouri
Harlond Beverly	20	G	6'6"	-	RS-Junior	Detroit, MI	Miami (FL)
Jacob Germany	24	F	6'11"	-	Senior	Kingston, OK	UTSA
Bijan Cortes	55	G	6'3"	-	Junior	Kingfisher, OK	Oklahoma

=== Recruiting class ===
There were no incoming recruits for the class of 2023.

== Roster ==
2023–24 Wichita State Shockers men's basketball team
Players
Coaches

Pos.	#	Name	Height	Weight	Year	Previous school	Hometown
G	1	Xavier Bell	6 ft 2 in (1.88 m)	185 lb (84 kg)	Jr	Drexel	Wichita, KS
F	3	Ronnie DeGray III	6 ft 6 in (1.98 m)	225 lb (102 kg)	Jr	Missouri	Parker, CO
G	4	Colby Rogers	6 ft 4 in (1.93 m)	190 lb (86 kg)	RS Jr	Siena	Covington, GA
F	5	Isaac Abidde	6 ft 8 in (2.03 m)	208 lb (94 kg)	RS So	Westover Comprehensive High School	Albany, GA
G	8	Yanis Bamba	6 ft 5 in (1.96 m)	211 lb (96 kg)	Fr	Collège Jean-de-Brébeuf	Laval, QC
F	10	Dalen Ridgnal	6 ft 6 in (1.98 m)	209 lb (95 kg)	GS	Missouri State	Kansas City, MO
F	11	Kenny Pohto	6 ft 10 in (2.08 m)	243 lb (110 kg)	Jr	Sunrise Christian Academy	Stockholm, Sweden
G	12	Joy Ighovodja	6 ft 4 in (1.93 m)	205 lb (93 kg)	Fr	NBA Academy Africa	Abeokuta, Nigeria
G	14	Trevor McBride (W)	6 ft 0 in (1.83 m)	150 lb (68 kg)	RS Fr	Basehor-Linwood High School	Basehor, KS
C	15	Quincy Ballard	6 ft 11 in (2.11 m)	251 lb (114 kg)	Jr	Florida State	Syracuse, NY
G	20	Harlond Beverly	6 ft 5 in (1.96 m)	195 lb (88 kg)	RS Jr	Miami (FL)	Detroit, MI
F	21	Henry Thengvall (W)	6 ft 6 in (1.98 m)	199 lb (90 kg)	RS Fr	Kapaun Mt. Carmel Catholic High School	Wichita, KS
F	24	Jacob Germany	6 ft 10 in (2.08 m)	226 lb (103 kg)	Sr	UTSA	Kingston, OK
G	55	Bijan Cortes	6 ft 2 in (1.88 m)	188 lb (85 kg)	Jr	Oklahoma	Kingfisher, OK

Head coach

- Paul Mills (Texas A&M)

Assistant coach(es)

- Kenton Paulino (Texas)
- T.J. Cleveland (Arkansas)
- Quincy Acy (Baylor)

Legend

- (C) Team captain
- (S) Suspended
- (I) Ineligible
- (W) Walk-on
- Injured
- Current redshirt

Roster
Last update: December 10, 2023

== Schedule and results ==
Date time, TV	Rank^{#}	Opponent^{#}	Result	Record	High points	High rebounds	High assists	Site (attendance) city, state
Exhibition
October 29, 2023*; 1:00 p.m.		Rogers State	W 74–53	–	14 – Ballard	11 – Pohto	5 – Bell	Charles Koch Arena (4,674); Wichita, KS
Non-conference regular season
November 6, 2023*; 6:30 p.m., ESPN+		Lipscomb	W 76–59	1–0	20 – Rogers	11 – Pohto	5 – Bell	Charles Koch Arena (6,286); Wichita, KS
November 9, 2023*; 6:30 p.m., ESPN+		Western Kentucky	W 71–61	2–0	16 – Pohto	13 – Ridgnal	3 – Tied	Charles Koch Arena (6,351); Wichita, KS
November 12, 2023*; 1:00 p.m., ESPN+		Friends	W 95–65	3–0	18 – Rogers	10 – Ballard	6 – Beverly	Charles Koch Arena (6,303); Wichita, KS
November 16, 2023*; 3:30 p.m., ESPNU		at Coastal Carolina; Myrtle Beach Invitational quarterfinals	W 86–77	4–0	20 – Bell	8 – Pohto	6 – Rogers	HTC Center (1,417); Conway, SC
November 17, 2023*; 8:00 p.m., ESPNU		vs. Liberty; Myrtle Beach Invitational semifinals	L 66–83	4–1	24 – Bell	10 – Ridgnal	2 – Bell	HTC Arena (1,281); Conway, SC
November 19, 2023*; 7:00 p.m., ESPN2		vs. Saint Louis; Myrtle Beach Invitational 3rd place game	W 88–69	5–1	28 – Rogers	12 – Pohto	3 – Tied	HTC Arena (1,233); Conway, SC
November 25, 2023*; 6:00 p.m., ESPN+		Norfolk State	W 80–67	6–1	25 – Pohto	8 – Pohto	8 – Beverly	Charles Koch Arena (4,780); Wichita, KS
November 29, 2023*; 6:30 p.m., ESPN+		Richmond	W 80–68	7–1	19 – Rogers	8 – Ballard	7 – Beverly	Charles Koch Arena (6,195); Wichita, KS
December 3, 2023*; 2:00 p.m., ESPN2		at Missouri	L 72–82	7–2	17 – Rogers	17 – Beverly	4 – Beverly	Mizzou Arena (10,885); Columbia, MO
December 9, 2023*; 6:00 p.m.		vs. South Dakota State	L 69–79	7–3	21 – Rogers	13 – Pohto	4 – Tied	Intrust Bank Arena (4,076); Wichita, KS
December 16, 2023*; 6:00 p.m., ESPN+		Southern Illinois	W 69–68	8–3	20 – Tied	12 – Pohto	4 – Beverly	Charles Koch Arena (7,187); Wichita, KS
December 22, 2023*; 7:30 p.m., ESPN+		vs. Kansas State; Wildcat Classic	L 60–69	8–4	13 – Ballard	7 – Ballard	3 – Tied	T-Mobile Center (18,660); Kansas City, MO
December 30, 2023*; 3:00 p.m., ESPN2		vs. No. 2 Kansas	L 67–86	8–5	13 – Ridgnal	7 – Ridgnal	4 – Pohto	T-Mobile Center (18,702); Kansas City, MO
AAC regular season
January 4, 2024; 8:00 p.m., ESPN2		North Texas	L 62–74	8–6 (0–1)	18 – Rogers	11 – Ridgnal	4 – Bell	Charles Koch Arena (5,531); Wichita, KS
January 7, 2024; 12:00 p.m., ESPNU		at Temple	L 61–68	8–7 (0–2)	14 – Pohto	16 – Ridgnal	4 – Rogers	Liacouras Center (3,247); Philadelphia, PA
January 14, 2024; 12:00 p.m., ESPN2		No. 13 Memphis	L 86–112	8–8 (0–3)	20 – Rogers	5 – Tied	6 – Beverly	Charles Koch Arena (5,538); Wichita, KS
January 18, 2024; 6:00 p.m., ESPN2		at No. 23 Florida Atlantic	L 77–86	8–9 (0–4)	18 – Tied	6 – Tied	4 – Cortes	Eleanor R. Baldwin Arena (3,161); Boca Raton, FL
January 21, 2024; 1:00 p.m., ESPN+		at South Florida	L 68–72	8–10 (0–5)	15 – Beverly	8 – Bell	3 – Rogers	Yuengling Center (4,414); Tampa, FL
January 24, 2024; 6:30 p.m., ESPN+		East Carolina	L 52–54	8–11 (0–6)	18 – Beverly	9 – Ballard	2 – Beverly	Charles Koch Arena (5,252); Wichita, KS
January 28, 2024; 2:00 p.m., ESPN2		SMU	W 77–72	9–11 (1–6)	14 – Beverly	6 – Ballard	5 – Bell	Charles Koch Arena (4,373); Wichita, KS
January 31, 2024; 6:00 p.m., ESPNU		at Tulsa; Rivalry	L 68–79	9–12 (1–7)	13 – Rogers	7 – Ballard	5 – Beverly	Reynolds Center (5,028); Tulsa, OK
February 3, 2024; 12:00 p.m., CBS		at Memphis	L 63–65	9–13 (1–8)	19 – Rogers	10 – Beverly	4 – Rogers	FedExForum (12,582); Memphis, TN
February 7, 2024; 6:30 p.m., ESPN+		UTSA	W 84–64	10–13 (2–8)	18 – Rogers	8 – Pohto	5 – Tied	Charles Koch Arena (6,133); Wichita, KS
February 11, 2024; 11:00 a.m., ESPN2		No. 20 Florida Atlantic	L 82–95 ^{OT}	10–14 (2–9)	21 – Rogers	8 – Pohto	3 – Rogers	Charles Koch Arena (6,513); Wichita, KS
February 15, 2024; 6:00 p.m., ESPN+		at East Carolina	L 55–68	10–15 (2–10)	16 – Rogers	7 – Pohto	5 – Cortes	Williams Arena (3,940); Greenville, NC
February 18, 2024; 11:00 a.m., ESPN2		at Charlotte	L 61–72	10–16 (2–11)	16 – Bell	4 – Tied	4 – Cortes	Dale F. Halton Arena (4,215); Charlotte, NC
February 21, 2024; 8:00 p.m., ESPNU		Tulsa; Rivalry	W 79–63	11–16 (3–11)	19 – Rogers	7 – Pohto	4 – Cortes	Charles Koch Arena (5,245); Wichita, KS
February 25, 2024; 3:00 p.m., ESPN2		Temple	L 66–72 ^{OT}	11–17 (3–12)	17 – Bell	9 – Pohto	4 – Cortes	Charles Koch Arena (7,019); Wichita, KS
February 28, 2024; 7:00 p.m., ESPN+		at UAB	W 74–66	12–17 (4–12)	29 – Rogers	8 – Beverly	5 – Beverly	Bartow Arena (4,487); Birmingham, AL
March 2, 2024; 6:00 p.m., ESPN+		Rice	W 87–66	13–17 (5–12)	25 – Rogers	6 – Tied	5 – Tied	Charles Koch Arena (7,034); Wichita, KS
March 8, 2024; 8:00 p.m., ESPN2		at Tulane	L 75–85	13–18 (5–13)	29 – Rogers	13 – Ridgnal	4 – Cortes	Devlin Fieldhouse (1,835); New Orleans, LA
AAC tournament
March 13, 2024; 12:00 p.m., ESPN+	(12)	vs. (13) Rice; First round	W 88–81	14–18	22 – Rogers	8 – DeGray III	6 – Bell	Dickies Arena; Fort Worth, TX
March 14, 2024; 1:30 p.m., ESPNU	(12)	vs. (5) Memphis; Second round	W 71–65	15–18	17 – Beverly	8 – Ballard	5 – Tied	Dickies Arena (5,530); Fort Worth, TX
March 15, 2024; 2:00 p.m., ESPN2	(12)	vs. (4) UAB; Quarterfinals	L 60–72	15–19	14 – Tied	12 – Ballard	6 – Cortes	Dickies Arena; Fort Worth, TX
*Non-conference game. ^{#}Rankings from AP Poll. (#) Tournament seedings in parentheses. All times are in Central Time.
