= 2022–23 Western Kentucky Hilltoppers basketball team =

American college basketball season

2022–23 Western Kentucky Hilltoppers basketball
- Conference: Conference USA
- Record: 17–16 (8–12 C-USA)
- Head coach: Rick Stansbury (7th season)
- Associate head coach: Phil Cunningham
- Assistant coaches: Martin Cross; Marcus Grant
- Home arena: E. A. Diddle Arena

2022–23 Conference USA men's basketball standings
	Conf.				Overall
Team	W		L	PCT	W		L	PCT
No. 25 Florida Atlantic †	18	–	2	.900	35	–	4	.897
North Texas	16	–	4	.800	31	–	7	.816
UAB	14	–	6	.700	29	–	10	.744
Middle Tennessee	11	–	9	.550	19	–	14	.576
Charlotte	9	–	11	.450	22	–	14	.611
Rice	8	–	12	.400	19	–	16	.543
FIU	8	–	12	.400	14	–	18	.438
Western Kentucky	8	–	12	.400	17	–	16	.515
UTEP	7	–	13	.350	14	–	18	.438
Louisiana Tech	7	–	13	.350	15	–	18	.455
UTSA	4	–	16	.200	10	–	22	.313
† 2023 C-USA tournament winner Rankings from AP poll

The 2022–23 Western Kentucky Hilltoppers men's basketball team represented Western Kentucky University during the 2022–23 NCAA Division I men's basketball season. The Hilltoppers were led by head coach Rick Stansbury in his seventh season and played their home games at E. A. Diddle Arena in Bowling Green, Kentucky as ninth-year members of Conference USA. They finished the season 17–16, 8–12 in C-USA play to finish in a tie for seventh place. As the No. 8 seed in the C-USA tournament, they defeated UTEP in the first round before losing to Florida Atlantic in the quarterfinals.

On March 11, 2023, the school announced that head coach Rick Stansbury had resigned. On March 18, the school named Texas A&M–Corpus Christi head coach Steve Lutz the team's new head coach.

== Previous season ==
The Hilltoppers finished the 2021–22 season 19–13, 11–7 in C-USA play to finish tied for second the West Division. They quarterfinals of the C-USA tournament to Louisiana Tech.

== Offseason ==
=== Departures ===
Name	Number	Pos.	Height	Weight	Year	Hometown	Reason for departure
Jaylen Butz	1	F	6'9"	230	RS Senior	Fort Wayne, IN	Graduated
Josh Anderson	4	G	6'6"	190	GS Senior	Baton Rouge, LA	Graduated
Sherman Brashear	13	G	6'5"	180	Sophomore	Dallas, TX	Transferred to Texas–Rio Grande Valley
Bailey Conrad	32	F	6'7"	220	Sophomore	Corydon, IN	Walk-on; transferred to The Citadel
Isaiah Cozart	50	F	6'7"	240	Junior	Richmond, KY	Transferred to Eastern Kentucky
Camron Justice	55	G	6'3"	185	GS Senior	Hindman, KY	Graduated

=== Incoming transfers ===
Name	Number	Pos.	Height	Weight	Year	Hometown	Previous School
Fallou Diagne	1	F	6'11"	200	RS Sophomore	Senegal, Africa	Northwest Florida State College
Jordan Rawls	2	G	6'1"	180	Senior	Chattanooga, TN	Georgia State
Khristian Lander	4	G	6'2"	185	Junior	Evansville, Indiana	Indiana
Dontaie Allen	11	G	6'6"	205	RS Junior	Falmouth, KY	Kentucky
Emmanuel Akot	13	G	6'8"	210	GS Senior	Winnipeg, MB	Boise State
Tyrone Marshall Jr.	24	F	6'7"	215	Junior	Nashville, TN	Colby CC

=== Recruiting classes ===
==== 2022 recruiting class ====
There were no incoming recruits for the class of 2022.

==== 2023 recruiting class ====
College recruiting information (2021)
Name	Hometown	School	Height	Weight	Commit date
Riley Allenspach #86 C	Cornelius, NC	Providence Day School	6 ft 10 in (2.08 m)	210 lb (95 kg)	Aug 5, 2022
Riley Allenspach #86 C	Recruit ratings: Scout: Rivals: 247Sports: ESPN: (77)				
Teagan Moore; SG	Owenton, KY	Owen County High School	6 ft 5 in (1.96 m)	210 lb (95 kg)	Jul 13, 2022
Teagan Moore; SG	Recruit ratings: Scout: Rivals: 247Sports: ESPN: (NR)				
Overall recruit ranking:
Note: In many cases, Scout, Rivals, 247Sports, On3, and ESPN may conflict in their listings of height and weight.; In these cases, the average was taken. ESPN grades are on a 100-point scale.; Sources: "2023 Team Ranking". Rivals.

== Roster ==
2022–23 WKU Hilltoppers men's basketball team
Players
Coaches

Pos.	#	Name	Height	Weight	Year	Previous school	Hometown
C	0	Darrius Miles	6 ft 10 in (2.08 m)	250 lb (113 kg)	Jr	Faith Family Academy; Odessa College	Oak Cliff, TX
F/C	1	Fallou Diagne	6 ft 11 in (2.11 m)	205 lb (93 kg)	RS So	Compass Prep; Northwest Florida State College	Dakar, Senegal
G	2	Jordan Rawls	6 ft 1 in (1.85 m)	185 lb (84 kg)	Sr	Hamilton Heights HS; Georgia State	Chattanooga, TN
F	3	Jairus Hamilton	6 ft 8 in (2.03 m)	230 lb (104 kg)	RS Sr	Cannon School; Maryland	Charlotte, NC
G	4	Khristian Lander	6 ft 3 in (1.91 m)	195 lb (88 kg)	Jr	FJ Reitz HS; Indiana	Evansville, IN
G	5	Noah Stansbury (W)	6 ft 0 in (1.83 m)	170 lb (77 kg)	RS So	Greenwood HS	Bowling Green, KY
G	10	Elijah Hughey	6 ft 4 in (1.93 m)	200 lb (91 kg)	RS Fr	Lancaster HS	Dallas, TX
G	11	Dontaie Allen	6 ft 6 in (1.98 m)	205 lb (93 kg)	RS Jr	Pendleton County HS; Kentucky	Falmouth, KY
G	12	Tyler Olden (W)	5 ft 11 in (1.8 m)	210 lb (95 kg)	So	Hillcrest Prep	Scottsdale, AZ
G	13	Emmanuel Akot	6 ft 8 in (2.03 m)	215 lb (98 kg)	RS Sr	Wasatch Academy; Boise State	Winnipeg, MB
G	14	Luke Frampton	6 ft 5 in (1.96 m)	205 lb (93 kg)	RS Sr	Poca HS; Davidson	Poca, WV
G	20	Dayvion McKnight	6 ft 1 in (1.85 m)	195 lb (88 kg)	Jr	Collins HS	Shelbyville, KY
F	23	Jaylen Dorsey (W)	6 ft 4 in (1.93 m)	210 lb (95 kg)	So	Berea HS	Berea, KY
F	24	Tyrone Marshall	6 ft 7 in (2.01 m)	215 lb (98 kg)	Jr	Pearl Cohn HS; Northwest Florida State College	Nashville, TN
C	33	Jamarion Sharp	7 ft 5 in (2.26 m)	235 lb (107 kg)	Sr	Hopkinsville HS; John A. Logan College	Hopkinsville, KY

Head coach

- Rick Stansbury (Campbellsville)

Assistant coach(es)

- Phil Cunningham (Campbellsville)
- Martin Cross (Western Kentucky)
- Marcus Grant (Mississippi State)

Legend

- (C) Team captain
- (S) Suspended
- (I) Ineligible
- (W) Walk-on
- Injured
- Current redshirt

Roster

== Schedule ==
Date time, TV	Rank^{#}	Opponent^{#}	Result	Record	High points	High rebounds	High assists	Site (attendance) city, state
Exhibition
November 2, 2022*; 7:00 p.m.		Montevallo	W 93–65		14 – Hamilton	9 – Hamilton	5 – McKnight	E. A. Diddle Arena (3,011); Bowling Green, KY
November 5, 2022*; 3:00 p.m.		Georgetown (KY)	W 88–68		17 – Hamilton	8 – McKnight	8 – Rawls	E. A. Diddle Arena (3,021); Bowling Green, KY
Non-conference Regular season
November 10, 2022*; 6:00 p.m., ESPN+		at Eastern Kentucky	W 66–60	1–0	21 – Frampton	9 – Hamilton	6 – McKnight	Baptist Health Arena (6,303); Richmond, KY
November 12, 2022*; 6:00 p.m.		Kentucky State	W 127–61	2–0	20 – Frampton	10 – Hamilton	10 – Akot	E. A. Diddle Arena (3,810); Bowling Green, KY
November 15, 2022*; 7:00 p.m., ESPN+		Indianapolis	W 68–50	3–0	16 – McKnight	11 – Sharp	3 – Tied	E. A. Diddle Arena (3,208); Bowling Green, KY
November 21, 2022*; 12:30 p.m., FloSports		vs. Akron; Cayman Islands Classic quarterfinals	L 53–72	3–1	13 – Akot	5 – McKnight	4 – Frampton	John Gray Gymnasium; George Town, Cayman Islands
November 22, 2022*; 10:00 a.m., FloSports		vs. Illinois State; Cayman Islands Classic consolation second round	W 78–66	4–1	14 – Tied	5 – Tied	5 – McKnight	John Gray Gymnasium; George Town, Cayman Islands
November 23, 2022*; 12:30 p.m., FloSports		vs. Tulane; Cayman Islands Classic 5th place game	W 71–65	5–1	19 – Frampton	7 – Frampton	8 – McKnight	John Gray Gymnasium; George Town, Cayman Islands
November 26, 2022*; 3:00 p.m., ESPN3/ESPN+		South Carolina State	W 90–64	6–1	18 – Frampton	9 – Hamilton	10 – McKnight	E. A. Diddle Arena (3,365); Bowling Green, KY
November 30, 2022*; 7:00 p.m., ESPN+		at Austin Peay	W 75–74	7–1	20 – Akot	9 – Sharp	7 – McKnight	Dunn Center (1,833); Clarksville, TN
December 10, 2022*; 6:00 p.m., ESPN3/ESPN+		Wright State	W 64–60	8–1	32 – McKnight	7 – Hamilton	3 – McKnight	E. A. Diddle Arena (4,010); Bowling Green, KY
December 14, 2022*; 8:00 p.m., ESPN2		at Louisville	L 83–94	8–2	25 – McKnight	12 – Hamilton	4 – Tied	KFC Yum! Center (12,417); Louisville, KY
December 22, 2022*; 6:00 p.m., SECN		at South Carolina	L 58–65	8–3	28 – McKnight	8 – McKnight	1 – Tied	Colonial Life Arena (9,163); Columbia, SC
Conference USA regular season
December 29, 2022; 6:00 p.m., ESPN+		Rice	L 78–81	8–4 (0–1)	18 – Hamilton	8 – Sharp	5 – Akot	E. A. Diddle Arena (4,018); Bowling Green, KY
December 31, 2022; 3:00 p.m., CBSSN		at Middle Tennessee	L 60–65	8–5 (0–2)	14 – Akot	8 – Sharp	6 – McKnight	Murphy Center (3,124); Murfreesboro, TN
January 5, 2023; 8:00 p.m., CBSSN		North Texas	L 66–70	8–6 (0–3)	29 – McKnight	5 – Tied	2 – Tied	E. A. Diddle Arena (3,024); Bowling Green, KY
January 7, 2023; 3:00 p.m., Stadium		at UTSA	W 74–64	9–6 (1–3)	16 – Akot	12 – Sharp	5 – Hamilton	Convocation Center (922); San Antonio, TX
January 11, 2023; 8:00 p.m., CBSSN		at UAB	W 80–78	10–6 (2–3)	27 – McKnight	8 – Sharp	4 – Tied	Bartow Arena (4,353); Birmingham, AL
January 14, 2023; 6:00 p.m., ESPN+		FIU	W 70–59	11–6 (3–3)	14 – McKnight	10 – Sharp	4 – McKnight	E. A. Diddle Arena (4,743); Bowling Green, KY
January 16, 2023; 6:00 p.m., ESPNU		No. 24 Florida Atlantic	L 62–76	11–7 (3–4)	15 – McKnight	9 – McKnight	4 – Rawls	E. A. Diddle Arena (5,206); Bowling Green, KY
January 19, 2023; 8:00 p.m., CBSSN		at Louisiana Tech	L 74–85 ^{OT}	11–8 (3–5)	15 – Sharp	11 – Sharp	8 – McKnight	Thomas Assembly Center (2,497); Ruston, LA
January 21, 2023; 6:00 p.m., ESPN+		Charlotte	L 71–75	11–9 (3–6)	25 – Rawls	7 – McKnight	3 – McKnight	E. A. Diddle Arena (4,793); Bowling Green, KY
January 26, 2023; 6:00 p.m., ESPN+		at FIU	L 69–78	11–10 (3–7)	23 – McKnight	7 – Hamilton	7 – Rawls	Ocean Bank Convocation Center (1,417); Miami, FL
January 28, 2023; 3:00 p.m., Stadium		at No. 21 Florida Atlantic	L 63–70	11–11 (3–8)	17 – Rawls	14 – Sharp	3 – Rawls	Eleanor R. Baldwin Arena (3,012); Boca Raton, FL
February 2, 2023; 7:00 p.m., ESPN+		UTSA	W 81–74	12–11 (4–8)	22 – Allen	7 – Tied	5 – Akot	E. A. Diddle Arena (3,226); Bowling Green, KY
February 4, 2023; 3:00 p.m., Stadium		UTEP	W 74–69	13–11 (5–8)	25 – Allen	11 – Sharp	4 – McKnight	E. A. Diddle Arena (4,169); Bowling Green, KY
February 9, 2023; 7:00 p.m., CBSSN		Middle Tennessee	W 93–89	14–11 (6–8)	33 – McKnight	6 – Hamilton	5 – McKnight	E. A. Diddle Arena (4,019); Bowling Green, KY
February 16, 2023; 6:00 p.m., ESPN+		at Charlotte	L 64–68 ^{OT}	14–12 (6–9)	24 – Allen	10 – Sharp	3 – McKnight	Dale F. Halton Arena (2,674); Charlotte, NC
February 18, 2023; 7:00 p.m., ESPN+		at Rice	L 77–83	14–13 (6–10)	21 – McKnight	8 – McKnight	6 – Rawls	Tudor Fieldhouse (2,141); Houston, TX
February 23, 2023; 8:00 p.m., CBSSN		Louisiana Tech	W 76–66	15–13 (7–10)	19 – McKnight	11 – Sharp	3 – Tied	E. A. Diddle Arena (3,156); Bowling Green, KY
February 25, 2023; 7:00 p.m., CBSSN		UAB	L 60–72	15–14 (7–11)	20 – Hamilton	7 – Akot	6 – McKnight	E. A. Diddle Arena (5,623); Bowling Green, KY
March 2, 2023; 8:00 p.m., ESPN+		at UTEP	W 73–68	16–14 (8–11)	24 – McKnight	9 – Sharp	3 – McKnight	Don Haskins Center (3,725); El Paso, TX
March 4, 2023; 2:00 p.m., Stadium		at North Texas	L 33–67	16–15 (8–12)	8 – Sharp	11 – Sharp	2 – Marshall	The Super Pit (5,002); Denton, TX
Conference USA Tournament
March 8, 2023; 5:30 p.m., ESPN+	(8)	vs. (9) UTEP; First round	W 73–67	17–15	16 – Sharp	8 – Sharp	7 – McKnight	Ford Center at The Star; Frisco, TX
March 9, 2023; 5:30 p.m., ESPN+	(8)	vs. (1) Florida Atlantic; Quarterfinals	L 51–75	17–16	18 – McKnight	11 – Sharp	2 – McKnight	Ford Center at The Star (1,773); Frisco, TX
*Non-conference game. ^{#}Rankings from AP Poll. (#) Tournament seedings in parentheses. All times are in Central Time.
