= 2023 Conference USA men's basketball tournament =

U.S. college basketball tournament

- Classification: Division I
- Season: 2022–23
- Teams: 11
- Site: Ford Center at The Star; Frisco, Texas
- Champions: Florida Atlantic (1st title)
- Winning coach: Dusty May (1st title)
- MVP: Alijah Martin (Florida Atlantic)
- Television: ESPN+, CBSSN

2022–23 Conference USA men's basketball standings
	Conf.				Overall
Team	W		L	PCT	W		L	PCT
No. 25 Florida Atlantic †	18	–	2	.900	35	–	4	.897
North Texas	16	–	4	.800	31	–	7	.816
UAB	14	–	6	.700	29	–	10	.744
Middle Tennessee	11	–	9	.550	19	–	14	.576
Charlotte	9	–	11	.450	22	–	14	.611
Rice	8	–	12	.400	19	–	16	.543
FIU	8	–	12	.400	14	–	18	.438
Western Kentucky	8	–	12	.400	17	–	16	.515
UTEP	7	–	13	.350	14	–	18	.438
Louisiana Tech	7	–	13	.350	15	–	18	.455
UTSA	4	–	16	.200	10	–	22	.313
† 2023 C-USA tournament winner Rankings from AP poll

The 2023 Conference USA men's basketball tournament was held March 8–11, 2023, at Ford Center at The Star in Frisco, Texas. First-round and quarterfinal games of the tournament were televised on ESPN+ while the semifinal and championship games were aired on CBS Sports Network. The winner of the tournament, Florida Atlantic, received the conference's automatic bid to the 2023 NCAA tournament.

== Seeds ==
Teams were seeded by conference record. The top five teams received byes to the quarterfinals.

Seed	School	Conference record	Tiebreaker
1	Florida Atlantic	18–2	
2	North Texas	16–4	
3	UAB	14–6	
4	Middle Tennessee	11–9	
5	Charlotte	9–11	
6	Rice	8–12	3–1 vs. FIU/Western Kentucky
7	FIU	8–12	2–2 vs. Rice/Western Kentucky
8	Western Kentucky	8–12	1–3 vs. Rice/FIU
9	UTEP	7–13	1–1 vs. Middle Tennessee
10	Louisiana Tech	7–13	0–2 vs. Middle Tennessee
11	UTSA	4–16	

== Schedule ==
Game	Time	Matchup	Score	Television	Attendance
First round – March 8, 2023
1	5:30 pm	(8) Western Kentucky vs. (9) UTEP	73–67	ESPN+	1,041
2	8:00 pm	(7) FIU vs. (10) Louisiana Tech	76–81^{OT}	ESPN+	1,232
3	8:30 pm	(6) Rice vs. (11) UTSA	72–71	ESPN+	1,232
Quarterfinals – March 9, 2023
4	5:30 pm	(1) Florida Atlantic vs. (8) Western Kentucky	75–51	ESPN+	1,773
5	6:00 pm	(4) Middle Tennessee vs. (5) Charlotte	66–65	ESPN+	1,773
6	8:00 pm	(2) North Texas vs. (10) Louisiana Tech	74–46	ESPN+	2,765
7	8:30 pm	(3) UAB vs. (6) Rice	87–60	ESPN+	2,765
Semifinals – March 10, 2023
8	11:30 am	(1) Florida Atlantic vs. (4) Middle Tennessee	68–65	CBSSN	2,005
9	2:00 pm	(2) North Texas vs. (3) UAB	69–76	CBSSN	2,005
Championship – March 11, 2023
10	7:30 pm	(1) Florida Atlantic vs. (3) UAB	78–56	CBSSN	1,681
*Game times in CT. ()-Rankings denote tournament seeding.

== Bracket ==
First round Wednesday, March 8
8	Western Kentucky	73
9	UTEP	67
7	Florida International	76
10	Louisiana Tech	81*
6	Rice	72
11	UTSA	71

Quarterfinals; Thursday, March 9
1	Florida Atlantic	75
8	Western Kentucky	51
4	Middle Tennessee	66
5	Charlotte	65
2	North Texas	74
10	Louisiana Tech	46
3	UAB	87
6	Rice	60

Semifinals; Friday, March 10
1	Florida Atlantic	68
4	Middle Tennessee	65
2	North Texas	69
3	UAB	76

Championship; Saturday, March 11
1	Florida Atlantic	78
3	UAB	56

* – Denotes overtime period

== Game summaries ==
=== First round ===
ESPN+

March 8, 2023
5:30 pm

Report

No. 8 Western Kentucky 73, No. 9 UTEP 67
Scoring by half: 28–34, 33–45
Pts: Sharp (16); Rebs: Sharp (8); Asts: McKnight (7)	Pts: Solomon (18); Rebs: Onyema (9); Asts: Givance (8)

Ford Center at The Star
Frisco, Texas
Attendance: 1,041
Referees: Amy Bonner
Gary Maxwell
Shane Staggs

ESPN+

March 8, 2023
8:00 pm

Report

No. 7 Florida International 76, No. 10 Louisiana Tech 81 (OT)
Scoring by half: 24–36, 45–33 Overtime: 7–12
Pts: Jones (25); Rebs: Dean (6); Asts: Dean (7)	Pts: Willis (23); Rebs: Mangum (11); Asts: Crawford/Willis (3)

Ford Center at The Star
Frisco, Texas
Attendance: 1,232
Referees: Rick Crawford
John St. Clair
Antinio Petty

ESPN+

March 8, 2023
8:30 pm

Report

No. 6 Rice 72, No. 11 UTSA 71
Scoring by half: 42–33, 30–38
Pts: Olivari (18); Rebs: Olivari (8); Asts: Fiedler (6)	Pts: Medor (20); Rebs: Richards (7); Asts: Medor (6)

Ford Center at The Star
Frisco, Texas
Attendance: 1,232
Referees: Darron George
Chris Merlo
Chris Pacsi

=== Quarterfinals ===
ESPN+

March 9, 2023
5:30 pm

Report

No. 1 Florida Atlantic 75, No. 9 Western Kentucky 51
Scoring by half: 30–20, 45–31
Pts: Davis (14); Rebs: Greenlee (8); Asts: Davis (4)	Pts: McKnight (18); Rebs: Sharp (11); Asts: McKnight (2)

Ford Center at The Star
Frisco, Texas
Attendance: 1,773
Referees: Kelly Self
Craig Murley
Kevin Mathis

ESPN+

March 9, 2023
6:00 pm

Report

No. 4 Middle Tennessee 66, No. 5 Charlotte 65
Scoring by half: 26–28, 40–37
Pts: Weston (22); Rebs: Dishman (9); Asts: Dishman/Weston/Lenard Jr./Bufford/Millin (1)	Pts: Khalifa/Patterson (14); Rebs: Khalifa (7); Asts: Khalifa (4)

Ford Center at The Star
Frisco, Texas
Attendance: 1,773
Referees: Rick Crawford
Antinio Petty
Chris Hudson

ESPN+

March 9, 2023
8:00 pm

Report

No. 2 North Texas 74, No. 10 Louisiana Tech 46
Scoring by half: 35–19, 39–27
Pts: Scott (19); Rebs: Ousmane (9); Asts: Huntsberry (4)	Pts: J. Crawford (10); Rebs: Hunter (5); Asts: I. Crawford/J. Crawford (1)

Ford Center at The Star
Frisco, Texas
Attendance: 2,765
Referees: Darron George
Tyler Kumpf
James Duke

ESPN+

March 9, 2023
8:30 pm

Report

No. 3 UAB 87, No. 6 Rice 60
Scoring by half: 40–30, 47–30
Pts: Walker (27); Rebs: Jemison (10); Asts: Gaines (6)	Pts: Evee (20); Rebs: Sheffield (6); Asts: Fiedler (5)

Ford Center at The Star
Frisco, Texas
Attendance: 2,765
Referees: Stephen Divine
Rodrick Dixon
Gary Maxwell

=== Semifinals ===
CBSSN

March 10, 2023
11:30 am

Report

No. 1 Florida Atlantic 68, No. 4 Middle Tennessee 65
Scoring by half: 37–25, 31–40
Pts: Davis (18); Rebs: Martin (6); Asts: Greenlee (3)	Pts: Dishman (17); Rebs: Dishman (11); Asts: Weston (6)

Ford Center at The Star
Frisco, Texas
Referees: Darron George
Tyler Kumpf
Gary Maxwell

CBSSN

March 10, 2023
2:00 pm

Report

No. 2 North Texas 69, No. 3 UAB 76
Scoring by half: 28–35, 41–41
Pts: Perry (17); Rebs: Scott (13); Asts: Huntsberry (4)	Pts: Walker (32); Rebs: Buffen (7); Asts: Walker (6)

Ford Center at The Star
Frisco, Texas
Attendance: 2,005
Referees: Rick Crawford
Jeb Hartness
Antinio Petty

=== Championship game ===
CBSSN

March 11, 2023
7:30 pm

Report

No. 1 Florida Atlantic 78, No. 3 UAB 56
Scoring by half: 46–27, 32–29
Pts: Martin (30); Rebs: Martin (11); Asts: Rosado/Boyd/Gaffney (2)	Pts: Walker (18); Rebs: Jemison (8); Asts: Gaines (2)

Ford Center at The Star
Frisco, Texas
Attendance: 1,681
Referees: Jeb Hartness, Antinio Petty, Gary Maxwell

*Game times: CT

== See also ==
- 2023 Conference USA women's basketball tournament
- Conference USA men's basketball tournament
- Conference USA
