= 2022–23 UTEP Miners men's basketball team =

American college basketball season

2022–23 UTEP Miners men's basketball
- Conference: Conference USA
- Record: 14–18 (7–13 CUSA)
- Head coach: Joe Golding (2nd season)
- Associate head coach: Jeremy Cox
- Assistant coaches: Earl Boykins; Bryen Spriggs
- Home arena: Don Haskins Center

2022–23 Conference USA men's basketball standings
	Conf.				Overall
Team	W		L	PCT	W		L	PCT
No. 25 Florida Atlantic †	18	–	2	.900	35	–	4	.897
North Texas	16	–	4	.800	31	–	7	.816
UAB	14	–	6	.700	29	–	10	.744
Middle Tennessee	11	–	9	.550	19	–	14	.576
Charlotte	9	–	11	.450	22	–	14	.611
Rice	8	–	12	.400	19	–	16	.543
FIU	8	–	12	.400	14	–	18	.438
Western Kentucky	8	–	12	.400	17	–	16	.515
UTEP	7	–	13	.350	14	–	18	.438
Louisiana Tech	7	–	13	.350	15	–	18	.455
UTSA	4	–	16	.200	10	–	22	.313
† 2023 C-USA tournament winner Rankings from AP poll

The 2022–23 UTEP Miners men's basketball team represented the University of Texas at El Paso during the 2022–23 NCAA Division I men's basketball season. The team was led by second-year head coach Joe Golding, and played their home games at the Don Haskins Center in El Paso, Texas as a member of Conference USA.

== Previous season ==
The Miners finished the 2021–22 season 20–14, 11–7 in C-USA play to finish in fourth place in West Division. They defeated Old Dominion in the second round of the C-USA tournament before losing to Middle Tennessee in the quarterfinals. They were invited to The Basketball Classic where they defeated Western Illinois before losing to Southern Utah in the second round.

== Offseason ==
=== Departures ===
Name	Number	Pos.	Height	Weight	Year	Hometown	Reason for departure
Souley Boum	0	G	6'3"	160	RS Senior	Oakland, CA	Graduated transferred to Xavier
Tydus Verhoeven	1	F	6'9"	235	RS Senior	Manteca, CA	Graduate transferred to Northwestern
Christian Agnew	2	G	6'2"	182	Senior	Detroit, MI	Graduate transferred to Southeastern Louisiana
Keonte Kennedy	3	G	6'5"	180	RS Junior	Austin, TX	Transferred to Memphis
Kezza Giffa	4	G	6'2"	160	Freshman	Paris, France	Transferred
Emmanuel White	5	G	6'5"	180	RS Junior	Katy, TX	Transferred to Western New Mexico
Bonke Maring	11	F	6'10"	240	Junior	Cypress, TX	Transferred to Houston Christian
Cam Clardy	13	G	6'1"	192	Sophomore	Cypress, TX	Walk-on; transferred
Alfred Hollins	15	F	6'6"	215	Senior	San Francisco, CA	Graduated
Jorell Saterfield	23	G/F	6'4"	191	Junior	Chicago, IL	Transferred to Portland State
Jamal Bieniemy	24	G	6'5"	177	Senior	New Orleans, LA	Graduated/went undrafted in 2022 NBA draft
Giles Dekoninck	33	F	6'6"	220	RS Senior	Diest, Belgium	Walk-on; left the team for personal reasons

=== Incoming transfers ===
Name	Number	Pos.	Height	Weight	Year	Hometown	Previous School
Jonathan dos Anjos	1	F	6'7"	205	RS Junior	Curitiba, Brazil	Florida SouthWestern State
Tae Hardy	2	G	6'3"	191	Junior	Ellenwood, GA	Southern Miss
Malik Zachery	3	G	6'2"	180	Junior	Syracuse, NY	South Plains College
Mario McKinney Jr.	4	G	6'1"	175	Junior	St. Louis, MO	New Mexico State
Shamar Givance	5	G	5'10"	170	Senior	Toronto, ON	Evansville
Carlos Lemus	11	G	6'3'	185	Sophomore	Cumaná, Venezuela	Chipola College
Calvin Solomon	13	F	6'7"	194	Junior	Houston, TX	Stephen F. Austin
Garrett Levesque	22	G/F	6'6"	210	Sophomore	El Paso, TX	Walk-on; Tarleton State
Otis Frazier	23	F	6’6”	212	Sophomore	Buckeye, AZ	George Mason
Derick Hamilton	32	F	6'10"	280	Sophomore	Baton Rouge, LA	Bossier Parish CC

=== Recruiting classes ===
==== 2022 recruiting class ====
College recruiting information
Name	Hometown	School	Height	Weight	Commit date
Jamal Sumlin; SF	Cleveland, OH	Rhodes High School	6 ft 2 in (1.88 m)	N/A	Apr 28, 2022
Jamal Sumlin; SF	Recruit ratings: Scout: Rivals: 247Sports: ESPN:				
Overall recruit ranking:
Note: In many cases, Scout, Rivals, 247Sports, On3, and ESPN may conflict in their listings of height and weight.; In these cases, the average was taken. ESPN grades are on a 100-point scale.; Sources: "2022 Team Ranking". Rivals.

==== 2023 recruiting class ====
College recruiting information (2022)
Name	Hometown	School	Height	Weight	Commit date
David Terrell; SG	Arlington, TX	Mansfield Summit High School	6 ft 4 in (1.93 m)	180 lb (82 kg)	Sep 20, 2022
David Terrell; SG	Recruit ratings: Scout: Rivals: 247Sports: ESPN:				
Trey Horton; SG	Charlotte, NC	Providence Day School	6 ft 5 in (1.96 m)	200 lb (91 kg)	Sep 26, 2022
Trey Horton; SG	Recruit ratings: Scout: Rivals: 247Sports: ESPN:				
Overall recruit ranking:
Note: In many cases, Scout, Rivals, 247Sports, On3, and ESPN may conflict in their listings of height and weight.; In these cases, the average was taken. ESPN grades are on a 100-point scale.; Sources: "2023 Team Ranking". Rivals.

== Roster ==
2022–23 UTEP Miners men's basketball team
Players
Coaches

Pos.	#	Name	Height	Weight	Year	Previous school	Hometown
G	0	Jamal Sumlin	6 ft 3 in (1.91 m)	180 lb (82 kg)	Fr	James Ford High School	Cleveland, Ohio
F	1	Jon Don Anjos	6 ft 8 in (2.03 m)	210 lb (95 kg)	RS Jr	Florida SouthWestern State College	Curitiba, Brazil
G	2	Tae Hardy	6 ft 3 in (1.91 m)	190 lb (86 kg)	Jr	Southern Miss	Ellenwood, Georgia
G	3	Malik Zachery	6 ft 2 in (1.88 m)	180 lb (82 kg)	Jr	South Plains College	Syracuse, New York
G	4	Mario McKinney Jr.	6 ft 1 in (1.85 m)	185 lb (84 kg)	Jr	New Mexico State	St. Louis, Missouri
G	5	Shamar Givance	5 ft 10 in (1.78 m)	170 lb (77 kg)	Sr	Evansville	Toronto, Ontario
G	11	Carlos Lemus	6 ft 3 in (1.91 m)	190 lb (86 kg)	So	Chipola College	Cumaná, Venezuela
F	12	Jamari Sibley	6 ft 8 in (2.03 m)	185 lb (84 kg)	So	Georgetown	Milwaukee, Wisconsin
F	13	Calvin Solomon	6 ft 7 in (2.01 m)	210 lb (95 kg)	Jr	Stephen F. Austin	Houston, Texas
G	15	Antwonne Holmes (W)	6 ft 3 in (1.91 m)	170 lb (77 kg)	Fr	Chapin High School	El Paso, Texas
G	20	Garrett Levesque (W)	6 ft 6 in (1.98 m)	200 lb (91 kg)	So	Tarleton State	El Paso, Texas
F	21	Ze'Rik Onyema	6 ft 8 in (2.03 m)	230 lb (104 kg)	So	John Jay High School	San Antonio, Texas
G/F	23	Otis Frazier III	6 ft 6 in (1.98 m)	210 lb (95 kg)	So	George Mason	Buckeye, Arizona
G	24	Milos Merrick (W)	6 ft 4 in (1.93 m)	210 lb (95 kg)	Fr	Florida Sports Academy	Wheeling, West Virginia
F	32	Derick Hamilton	6 ft 10 in (2.08 m)	285 lb (129 kg)	So	Bossier Parish CC	Baton Rouge, Louisiana
F	34	Kevin Kalu	6 ft 9 in (2.06 m)	240 lb (109 kg)	So	Our Lady of Mount Carmel School	Baltimore, Maryland

Head coach

- Joe Golding (Abilene Christian)

Assistant coach(es)

- Jeremy Cox (Colorado Mesa)
- Earl Boykins (Eastern Michigan)
- Bryen Spriggs (Slippery Rock)

Legend

- (C) Team captain
- (S) Suspended
- (I) Ineligible
- (W) Walk-on
- Injured
- Current redshirt

Roster

== Schedule and results ==
Date time, TV	Rank^{#}	Opponent^{#}	Result	Record	Site (attendance) city, state
Non-conference regular season
November 7, 2022*; 7:00 p.m., LHN		at No. 12 Texas	L 57–72	0–1	Moody Center (11,313); Austin, TX
November 12, 2022*; 7:00 p.m., CUSA.TV		New Mexico State; Battle of I-10	W 67–64	1–1	Don Haskins Center (11,315); El Paso, TX
November 15, 2022*; 7:00 p.m., CUSA.TV		Sul Ross State	W 99–59	2–1	Don Haskins Center (3,701); El Paso, TX
November 22, 2022*; 7:00 p.m., CUSA.TV		Alcorn State; Jim Forbes Classic	W 73–61 ^{2OT}	3–1	Don Haskins Center (4,073); El Paso, TX
November 23, 2022*; 7:00 p.m., CUSA.TV		Cal State Bakersfield; Jim Forbes Classic	W 68–67 ^{OT}	4–1	Don Haskins Center (3,736); El Paso, TX
November 25, 2022*; 2:00 p.m., CUSA.TV		Texas A&M–Corpus Christi; Jim Forbes Classic	W 72–67	5–1	Don Haskins Center (4,320); El Paso, TX
November 30, 2022*; 7:00 p.m., ESPN+		at New Mexico State; Battle of I-10	L 70–95	5–2	Pan American Center (6,332); Las Cruces, NM
December 3, 2022*; 2:00 p.m., CUSA.TV		Northern New Mexico	W 87–50	6–2	Don Haskins Center (3,498); El Paso, TX
December 10, 2022*; 4:30 p.m., FS1		at DePaul	L 70–91	6–3	Wintrust Arena (3,005); Chicago, IL
December 17, 2022; 6:00 p.m., CUSA.TV		Louisiana Tech	W 60–55	7–3 (1–0)	Don Haskins Center (4,768); El Paso, TX
December 21, 2022*; 7:30 p.m.		North Carolina A&T; Sun Bowl Invitational semifinals	W 75–62	8–3	Don Haskins Center (4,255); El Paso, TX
December 22, 2022*; 7:30 p.m., YouTube		Kent State; Sun Bowl Invitational	L 46–47	8–4	Don Haskins Center (5,705); El Paso, TX
December 29, 2022; 5:30 p.m., ESPN+		at UAB	L 73–79 ^{2OT}	8–5 (1–1)	Bartow Arena (3,747); Birmingham, AL
December 31, 2022; 2:00 p.m., CUSA.TV		Rice	L 67–72 ^{OT}	8–6 (1–2)	Don Haskins Center (3,743); El Paso, TX
January 7, 2023; 1:00 p.m., CUSA.TV		at Louisiana Tech	L 58–60	8–7 (1–3)	Thomas Assembly Center (2,435); Ruston, LA
January 11, 2023; 7:00 p.m., ESPN+		UTSA	W 69–57	9–7 (2–3)	Don Haskins Center (3,764); El Paso, TX
January 14, 2023; 1:00 p.m., CUSA.TV		at Rice	L 82–83	9–8 (2–4)	Tudor Fieldhouse (1,991); Houston, TX
January 16, 2023; 2:00 p.m., ESPN+		at Charlotte	W 60–58	10–8 (3–4)	Dale F. Halton Arena (3,045); Charlotte, NC
January 19, 2023; 7:00 p.m., ESPN+		FIU	W 81–61	11–8 (4–4)	Don Haskins Center (3,648); El Paso, TX
January 21, 2023; 7:00 p.m., ESPN+		No. 24 Florida Atlantic	L 59–67	11–9 (4–5)	Don Haskins Center (5,421); El Paso, TX
January 28, 2023; 4:00 p.m., ESPN+		at North Texas	L 42–52	11–10 (4–6)	The Super Pit (4,301); Denton, TX
February 2, 2023; 7:00 p.m., ESPNU		at Middle Tennessee	L 72–84	11–11 (4–7)	Murphy Center (2,806); Murfreesboro, TN
February 4, 2023; 2:00 p.m., Stadium		at Western Kentucky	L 69–74	11–12 (4–8)	E. A. Diddle Arena (4,169); Bowling Green, KY
February 9, 2023; 7:00 p.m., ESPN+		Charlotte	L 53–62	11–13 (4–9)	Don Haskins Center (3,768); El Paso, TX
February 11, 2023; 2:00 p.m., CUSA.TV		at UTSA	W 77–66	12–13 (5–9)	Convocation Center (1,127); San Antonio, TX
February 16, 2023; 7:00 p.m., ESPN+		UAB	L 66–79	12–14 (5–10)	Don Haskins Center (3,619); El Paso, TX
February 18, 2023; 7:00 p.m., ESPN+		North Texas	L 72–80 ^{OT}	12–15 (5–11)	Don Haskins Center (4,838); El Paso, TX
February 23, 2023; 5:00 p.m., ESPN+		at FIU	W 87–82	13–15 (6–11)	Ocean Bank Convocation Center (1,219); Miami, FL
February 25, 2023; 12:00 p.m., ESPN+		at Florida Atlantic	L 49–75	13–16 (6–12)	Eleanor R. Baldwin Arena (3,130); Boca Raton, FL
March 2, 2023; 7:00 p.m., ESPN+		Western Kentucky	L 68–73	13–17 (6–13)	Don Haskins Center (3,725); El Paso, TX
March 4, 2023; 2:00 p.m., ESPN+		Middle Tennessee	W 77–65	14–17 (7–13)	Don Haskins Center (4,044); El Paso, TX
Conference USA tournament
March 8, 2023; 5:30 p.m., ESPN+	(9)	vs. (8) Western Kentucky; First round	L 67–73	14–18	Ford Center at The Star; Frisco, TX
*Non-conference game. ^{#}Rankings from AP Poll. (#) Tournament seedings in parentheses. All times are in Mountain.
