= 2022–23 Rice Owls men's basketball team =

American college basketball season

2022–23 Rice Owls men's basketball

CBI, Quarterfinals
- Conference: Conference USA
- Record: 19–16 (8–12 CUSA)
- Head coach: Scott Pera (6th season)
- Assistant coaches: Van Green; Greg Howell; Russ Pennell
- Home arena: Tudor Fieldhouse

2022–23 Conference USA men's basketball standings
	Conf.				Overall
Team	W		L	PCT	W		L	PCT
No. 25 Florida Atlantic †	18	–	2	.900	35	–	4	.897
North Texas	16	–	4	.800	31	–	7	.816
UAB	14	–	6	.700	29	–	10	.744
Middle Tennessee	11	–	9	.550	19	–	14	.576
Charlotte	9	–	11	.450	22	–	14	.611
Rice	8	–	12	.400	19	–	16	.543
FIU	8	–	12	.400	14	–	18	.438
Western Kentucky	8	–	12	.400	17	–	16	.515
UTEP	7	–	13	.350	14	–	18	.438
Louisiana Tech	7	–	13	.350	15	–	18	.455
UTSA	4	–	16	.200	10	–	22	.313
† 2023 C-USA tournament winner Rankings from AP poll

The 2022–23 Rice Owls men's basketball team represented Rice University during the 2022–23 NCAA Division I men's basketball season. The team was led by sixth-year head coach Scott Pera, and played their home games at Tudor Fieldhouse in Houston, Texas as members of Conference USA (C-USA). The Owls finished the season 19–16, 8–12 in C-USA play, to finish in a three-way tie for sixth place. As the No. 6 seed in the C-USA tournament, they defeated UTSA before losing to UAB. They received an invitation to the College Basketball Invitational where they defeated Duquesne before losing to Southern Utah in quarterfinals.

This was the last season for the team as members of Conference USA before joining the American Athletic Conference on July 1, 2023.

== Previous season ==
The Owls finished the 2021–22 season 16–17, 7–11 in C-USA play, to finish in fifth place in West Division. They defeated Charlotte in second round of the C-USA tournament before losing to North Texas in the quarterfinals. They were invited to the CBI post-season tournament where they lost to Ohio in the first round.

== Offseason ==
=== Departures ===
Name	Number	Pos.	Height	Weight	Year	Hometown	Reason for departure
Noah Hutchins	1	G	6'1"	195	Freshman	Buffalo, NY	Transferred to Ranger College
Riley Abercrombie	11	F	6'10"	210	RS Sophomore	Wollongong, Australia	Transferred to Northern Colorado
Carl Pierre	12	G	6'4"	190	GS Senior	Boston, MA	Graduated
Terrance McBride	13	G	6'2"	170	Senior	Lynwood, CA	Graduated
Chris Mullins	24	G	6'3"	190	Junior	Grand Prairie, TX	Transferred to William & Mary
Mylyjael Poteat	34	F	6'9"	260	Sophomore	Reidsville, NC	Transferred to Virginia Tech

=== Incoming transfers ===
Name	Number	Pos.	Height	Weight	Year	Hometown	Previous school
Seryee Lewis	0	F	6'9"	230	Sophomore	Chicago, IL	Kansas State
Alem Huseinovic	23	G	6'4"	190	Sophomore	Zenica, Bosnia and Herzegovina	Nevada

=== Recruiting classes ===
==== 2022 recruiting class ====
College recruiting information
Name	Hometown	School	Height	Weight	Commit date
Mekhi Mason; SG	Chandler, AZ	AZ Compass Prep School	6 ft 5 in (1.96 m)	175 lb (79 kg)	Sep 12, 2020
Mekhi Mason; SG	Recruit ratings: No ratings found				
Mason Jones; SG	Chicago, IL	Link Year Preparatory School	6 ft 4 in (1.93 m)	175 lb (79 kg)	Oct 6, 2021
Mason Jones; SG	Recruit ratings: No ratings found				
Andrew Akuchie; PF	Plantation, FL	St. Thomas Aquinas High School	6 ft 8 in (2.03 m)	195 lb (88 kg)	Jun 13, 2021
Andrew Akuchie; PF	Recruit ratings: No ratings found				
Ifeanyi Ufochukwu; C	Matthews, NC	Covenant Day	6 ft 10 in (2.08 m)	220 lb (100 kg)	Sep 25, 2020
Ifeanyi Ufochukwu; C	Recruit ratings: 247Sports:				
Overall recruit ranking:
Note: In many cases, Scout, Rivals, 247Sports, On3, and ESPN may conflict in their listings of height and weight.; In these cases, the average was taken. ESPN grades are on a 100-point scale.; Sources: "2022 Team Ranking". Rivals.

==== 2023 recruiting class ====
College recruiting information (2023)
Name	Hometown	School	Height	Weight	Commit date
Keanu Dawes #21 PF	Houston, TX	Stratford High School	6 ft 7 in (2.01 m)	200 lb (91 kg)	Oct 11, 2022
Keanu Dawes #21 PF	Recruit ratings: Scout: Rivals: 247Sports: ESPN: (82)				
Overall recruit ranking:
Note: In many cases, Scout, Rivals, 247Sports, On3, and ESPN may conflict in their listings of height and weight.; In these cases, the average was taken. ESPN grades are on a 100-point scale.; Sources: "2023 Team Ranking". Rivals.

== Roster ==
2022–23 Rice Owls men's basketball team
Players
Coaches

Pos.	#	Name	Height	Weight	Year	Previous school	Hometown
G	0	Jaden Geron	6 ft 8 in (2.03 m)	175 lb (79 kg)	So	San Joaquin Memorial	Fresno, CA
F	1	Seryee Lewis	6 ft 9 in (2.06 m)	245 lb (111 kg)	So	Compass Prep	Chicago, IL
G	2	Mekhi Mason	6 ft 5 in (1.96 m)	195 lb (88 kg)	Fr	Compass Prep	Gilbert, AZ
G	3	Travis Evee	6 ft 1 in (1.85 m)	180 lb (82 kg)	Jr	Vermont Academy; VMI	Randolph, MA
G	4	Quincy Olivari	6 ft 3 in (1.91 m)	200 lb (91 kg)	Jr	Westlake HS	Atlanta, GA
G/F	5	Cameron Sheffield	6 ft 6 in (1.98 m)	200 lb (91 kg)	So	Chattahoochee HS	Alpharetta, GA
G	10	Mason Jones	6 ft 4 in (1.93 m)	200 lb (91 kg)	Fr	Bogan HS	Chicago, IL
C	11	Ifeanyi Ufchukwu	6 ft 10 in (2.08 m)	220 lb (100 kg)	Fr	Covenant Day School (NC)	Benin City, Nigeria
F	12	Ben Moffat (W)	6 ft 8 in (2.03 m)	225 lb (102 kg)	Jr	Rider HS	Wichita Falls, TX
F	13	Andrew Akuchie	6 ft 9 in (2.06 m)	200 lb (91 kg)	Fr	St. Thomas Aquinas HS	Fort Lauderdale, FL
G	14	Reed Myers (W)	6 ft 0 in (1.83 m)	180 lb (82 kg)	Jr	Scottsdale Christian Academy	Phoenix, AZ
F	15	Max Fiedler	6 ft 10 in (2.08 m)	235 lb (107 kg)	Jr	Melbourne HS	Indialantic, FL
F	20	Damion McDowell, Jr.	6 ft 6 in (1.98 m)	190 lb (86 kg)	So	St. Bernard Catholic School	Inglewood, CA
G	22	Jackson Peakes (W)	6 ft 4 in (1.93 m)	182 lb (83 kg)	RS Fr	St. John's HS	Houston, TX
G	23	Alem Huseinovic	6 ft 4 in (1.93 m)	190 lb (86 kg)	Jr	Phoenix Prep; Nevada	Zenica, Bosnia and Herzegovina
G	24	Jake Lieppert	6 ft 4 in (1.93 m)	200 lb (91 kg)	Jr	Saguaro HS	Scottsdale, AZ
F	30	George Perkins (W)	6 ft 8 in (2.03 m)	190 lb (86 kg)	Fr	Sidwell Friends School	Washington, D.C.

Head coach

- Scott Pera (Penn State)

Assistant coach(es)

- Van Green (Rice)
- Greg Howell (Waldorf)
- Russ Pennell (Central Arkansas)

Legend

- (C) Team captain
- (S) Suspended
- (I) Ineligible
- (W) Walk-on
- Injured
- Current redshirt

Roster
Last update: April 8, 2024

== Schedule and results ==
Date time, TV	Rank^{#}	Opponent^{#}	Result	Record	Site (attendance) city, state
Exhibition
October 31, 2022*; 7:00 p.m.		Rockhurst	W 112–68		Tudor Fieldhouse; Houston, TX
Regular season
November 7, 2022*; 9:00 p.m., WCC Network		at Pepperdine	L 67–106	0–1	Firestone Fieldhouse (1,258); Malibu, CA
November 10, 2022*; 5:00 p.m., CUSATV		St. Thomas (TX)	W 85–48	1–1	Tudor Fieldhouse (1,623); Houston, TX
November 15, 2022; 6:00 p.m., ESPN+		at Middle Tennessee	L 46–81	1–2 (0–1)	Murphy Center (2,802); Murfreesboro, TN
November 18, 2022*; 6:00 p.m., CUSATV		Georgia Southern; Owl Invitational	W 88–71	2–2	Tudor Fieldhouse (1,401); Houston, TX
November 19, 2022*; 5:00 p.m., CUSATV		Western Michigan; Owl Invitational	W 96–88	3–2	Tudor Fieldhouse (1,141); Houston, TX
November 21, 2022*; 7:00 p.m., CUSATV		Houston Christian; Owl Invitational	W 76–67	4–2	Tudor Fieldhouse (1,105); Houston, TX
November 30, 2022*; 7:00 p.m., CUSATV		Prairie View A&M	W 70–62	5–2	Tudor Fieldhouse (1,141); Houston, TX
December 4, 2022*; 2:00 p.m., ESPN+		at Texas State	W 83–71	6–2	Strahan Arena (1,282); San Marcos, TX
December 12, 2022*; 7:00 p.m., LHN		at No. 7 Texas	L 81–87 ^{OT}	6–3	Moody Center (10,763); Austin, TX
December 15, 2022*; 11:15 a.m., CUSATV		North American	W 92–54	7–3	Tudor Fieldhouse (2,952); Houston, TX
December 17, 2022*; 2:00 p.m., CUSATV		Northwestern State	W 110–73	8–3	Tudor Fieldhouse (1,771); Houston, TX
December 19, 2022*; 7:00 p.m., CUSATV		Jarvis Christian	W 109–64	9–3	Tudor Fieldhouse (1,467); Houston, TX
December 29, 2022; 6:00 p.m., ESPN+		at Western Kentucky	W 81–78	10–3 (1–1)	E. A. Diddle Arena (4,018); Bowling Green, KY
December 31, 2022; 3:00 p.m., CUSATV		at UTEP	W 72–67 ^{OT}	11–3 (2–1)	Don Haskins Center (3,743); El Paso, TX
January 5, 2023; 7:00 p.m., ESPN+		Louisiana Tech	L 82–88 ^{OT}	11–4 (2–2)	Tudor Fieldhouse (1,962); Houston, TX
January 11, 2023; 7:00 p.m., ESPN+		Middle Tennessee	L 68–71	11–5 (2–3)	Tudor Fieldhouse (2,010); Houston, TX
January 14, 2023; 2:00 p.m., CUSATV		UTEP	W 83–82	12–5 (3–3)	Tudor Fieldhouse (1,991); Houston, TX
January 16, 2023; 7:00 p.m., ESPN+		at UTSA	W 88–81 ^{OT}	13–5 (4–3)	Convocation Center (767); San Antonio, TX
January 19, 2023; 7:00 p.m., ESPN+		at North Texas	W 72–60	14–5 (5–3)	The Super Pit (4,015); Denton, TX
January 26, 2023; 7:00 p.m., ESPN+		Charlotte	W 65–63	15–5 (6–3)	Tudor Fieldhouse (1,665); Houston, TX
January 28, 2023; 2:00 p.m., ESPN+		UAB	L 52–70	15–6 (6–4)	Tudor Fieldhouse (2,454); Houston, TX
February 2, 2023; 6:00 p.m., ESPN+		at Louisiana Tech	L 72–80	15–7 (6–5)	Thomas Assembly Center (2,356); Ruston, LA
February 4, 2023; 7:00 p.m., ESPN+		North Texas	L 64–74	15–8 (6–6)	Tudor Fieldhouse (2,246); Houston, TX
February 9, 2023; 6:00 p.m., ESPN+		at Florida Atlantic	L 81–90	15–9 (6–7)	Eleanor R. Baldwin Arena (3,027); Boca Raton, FL
February 11, 2023; 6:00 p.m., CUSATV		at FIU	W 85–78	16–9 (7–7)	Ocean Bank Convocation Center (1,292); Miami, FL
February 16, 2023; 7:00 p.m., ESPN+		UTSA	L 79–84	16–10 (7–8)	Tudor Fieldhouse (1,999); Houston, TX
February 18, 2023; 7:00 p.m., ESPN+		Western Kentucky	W 83–77	17–10 (8–8)	Tudor Fieldhouse (2,141); Houston, TX
February 23, 2023; 6:30 p.m., ESPN+		at UAB	L 57–85	17–11 (8–9)	Bartow Arena (4,891); Birmingham, AL
February 25, 2023; 3:00 p.m., ESPN+		at Charlotte	L 54–70	17–12 (8–10)	Dale F. Halton Arena (2,837); Charlotte, NC
March 2, 2023; 7:00 p.m., ESPN+		Florida Atlantic	L 74–103	17–13 (8–11)	Tudor Fieldhouse (2,040); Houston, TX
March 4, 2023; 2:00 p.m., CUSATV		FIU	L 83–90	17–14 (8–12)	Tudor Fieldhouse (2,760); Houston, TX
Conference USA tournament
March 8, 2023; 8:30 p.m., ESPN+	(6)	vs. (11) UTSA; First round	W 72–71	18–14	Ford Center at The Star; Frisco, TX
March 9, 2023; 8:30 p.m., ESPN+	(6)	vs. (3) UAB; Quarterfinals	L 60–87	18–15	Ford Center at The Star (2,765); Frisco, TX
College Basketball Invitational
March 19, 2023; 1:30 p.m., FloHoops	(12)	vs. (5) Duquesne; First round	W 84–78	19–15	Ocean Center; Daytona Beach, FL
March 20, 2023; 1:00 p.m., FloHoops	(12)	vs. (4) Southern Utah; Quarterfinals	L 79–81	19–16	Ocean Center; Daytona Beach, FL
*Non-conference game. ^{#}Rankings from AP poll. (#) Tournament seedings in parentheses. All times are in Central.

== See also ==
- Rice Owls women's basketball
