= 2022–23 Louisiana Tech Bulldogs basketball team =

American college basketball season

2022–23 Louisiana Tech Bulldogs basketball
- Conference: Conference USA
- Record: 15–18 (7–13 C-USA)
- Head coach: Talvin Hester (1st season)
- Assistant coaches: Winston Hines; Aaron Smith; Darshawn McClellan
- Home arena: Thomas Assembly Center

2022–23 Conference USA men's basketball standings
	Conf.				Overall
Team	W		L	PCT	W		L	PCT
No. 25 Florida Atlantic †	18	–	2	.900	35	–	4	.897
North Texas	16	–	4	.800	31	–	7	.816
UAB	14	–	6	.700	29	–	10	.744
Middle Tennessee	11	–	9	.550	19	–	14	.576
Charlotte	9	–	11	.450	22	–	14	.611
Rice	8	–	12	.400	19	–	16	.543
FIU	8	–	12	.400	14	–	18	.438
Western Kentucky	8	–	12	.400	17	–	16	.515
UTEP	7	–	13	.350	14	–	18	.438
Louisiana Tech	7	–	13	.350	15	–	18	.455
UTSA	4	–	16	.200	10	–	22	.313
† 2023 C-USA tournament winner Rankings from AP poll

The 2022–23 Louisiana Tech Bulldogs basketball team represented Louisiana Tech University during the 2022–23 NCAA Division I men's basketball season. The team was led by first-year head coach Talvin Hester, and played their home games at Thomas Assembly Center in Ruston, Louisiana as a members of Conference USA.

== Previous season ==
The Bulldogs finished the 2021–22 season 24–10, 12–6 in C-USA play to finish third place in the West Division. They defeated Marshall, Western Kentucky, North Texas to advance to the championship game of the C-USA tournament where they lost to UAB. Despite having 24 wins, they were not invited to a postseason tournament.

On March 22, 2022, head coach Eric Konkol left the school to accept the head coaching position at Tulsa. A week later, the school named Texas Tech assistant coach Talvin Hester the team's new head coach.

== Offseason ==
=== Departures ===
Name	Number	Pos.	Height	Weight	Year	Hometown	Reason for departure
Kenneth Lofton Jr.	2	F	6'7"	275	Sophomore	Port Arthur, TX	Declare for 2022 NBA draft
Amorie Archibald	3	G	6'3"	185	GS Senior	Deltona, FL	Graduated
Stacey Thomas	13	F	6'8"	220	Senior	Houston, TX	Graduate transferred to LSU–Shreveport
Exavian Christon	21	G	6'4"	200	GS Senior	Hot Springs, AR	Graduated

=== Incoming transfers ===
Name	Number	Pos.	Height	Weight	Year	Hometown	Previous school
Dravon Mangum	2	F	6'8"	200	RS Senior	Roxboro, NC	Radford
Quandre Bullock	3	F	6'6"	195	Junior	Franklinton, NC	Angelina College

=== 2022 recruiting class ===
College recruiting information
Name	Hometown	School	Height	Weight	Commit date
Jordan Crawford; SG	Ruston, LA	Simsboro High School	6 ft 3 in (1.91 m)	175 lb (79 kg)	May 30, 2022
Jordan Crawford; SG	Recruit ratings: Scout: Rivals: 247Sports: ESPN:				
Pierre Geneste, Jr. C	Los Angeles, CA	Ribet Academy	6 ft 11 in (2.11 m)	180 lb (82 kg)	May 30, 2022
Pierre Geneste, Jr. C	Recruit ratings: Scout: Rivals: 247Sports: ESPN:				
Overall recruit ranking:
Note: In many cases, Scout, Rivals, 247Sports, On3, and ESPN may conflict in their listings of height and weight.; In these cases, the average was taken. ESPN grades are on a 100-point scale.; Sources: "2022 Team Ranking". Rivals.

== Roster ==
2022–23 Louisiana Tech Bulldogs men's basketball team
Players
Coaches

Pos.	#	Name	Height	Weight	Year	Previous school	Hometown
G	0	Keaston Willis	6 ft 3 in (1.91 m)	190 lb (86 kg)	RS Jr	Sulphur Springs HS; Incarnate Word	Sulphur Springs, TX
F	1	Kenny Hunter	6 ft 10 in (2.08 m)	235 lb (107 kg)	So	Huntington HS	Shreveport, LA
F	2	Dravon Mangum	6 ft 8 in (2.03 m)	205 lb (93 kg)	RS Sr	Person HS; Radford	Roxboro, NC
G	3	Quandre Bullock	6 ft 6 in (1.98 m)	195 lb (88 kg)	Jr	Word of God Christian Academy; Angelina College	Roxboro, NC
G	4	Kaleb Stewart	6 ft 3 in (1.91 m)	180 lb (82 kg)	So	Atascocita HS	Atascocita, TX
G	5	Terran Williams	6 ft 5 in (1.96 m)	200 lb (91 kg)	So	Marianna Lee HS	Marianna, AR
G	10	Ben Ponder (W)	6 ft 3 in (1.91 m)	195 lb (88 kg)	So	Calvary Baptist Academy	Shreveport, LA
G	11	LaDamien Bradford	6 ft 5 in (1.96 m)	215 lb (98 kg)	RS So	Jonesboro-Hodge HS; Texas A&M	Lincoln, NE
F	13	David Green	6 ft 7 in (2.01 m)	215 lb (98 kg)	RS So	Ocoee HS; Hofstra	Apopka, FL
F	14	Will Allen	6 ft 7 in (2.01 m)	210 lb (95 kg)	RS Fr	Alfred Bonnabel HS	New Orleans, LA
G	20	Jordan Crawford	6 ft 3 in (1.91 m)	175 lb (79 kg)	Fr	Simsboro HS	Ruston, LA
G	21	Exavian Christon	6 ft 4 in (1.93 m)	200 lb (91 kg)	RS Sr	Hot Springs HS	Hot Springs, AR
F	22	Isaiah Crawford	6 ft 6 in (1.98 m)	220 lb (100 kg)	RS Jr	North Crowley HS	Fort Worth, TX
G	24	Cobe Williams	6 ft 0 in (1.83 m)	180 lb (82 kg)	Jr	Kimball HS	Dallas, TX
F	34	Pierre Geneste Jr.	6 ft 11 in (2.11 m)	215 lb (98 kg)	Fr	Heritage Christian School	Los Angeles, CA

Head coach

- Talvin Hester (Texas Wesleyan)

Assistant coach(es)

- Winston Hines (Stillman)
- Aaron Smith (Prairie View A&M)
- Darshawn McClellan (Vanderbilt)

Legend

- (C) Team captain
- (S) Suspended
- (I) Ineligible
- (W) Walk-on
- Injured
- Current redshirt

Roster

== Schedule and results ==
Date time, TV	Rank^{#}	Opponent^{#}	Result	Record	Site (attendance) city, state
Regular season
November 7, 2022*; 8:00 p.m., CUSA.tv		Mississippi College	W 78–61	1–0	Thomas Assembly Center (2,567); Ruston, LA
November 14, 2022*; 7:00 p.m., ESPN+		at No. 23 Texas Tech	L 55–64	1–1	United Supermarkets Arena (13,027); Lubbock, TX
November 17, 2022*; 7:00 p.m., ESPN+		at Louisiana	L 88–94	1–2	Cajundome (3,181); Lafayette, LA
November 21, 2022*; 6:00 p.m., CUSA.tv		Louisiana–Monroe	W 79–58	2–2	Thomas Assembly Center (2,214); Ruston, LA
November 23, 2022*; 7:00 p.m.		at Alabama A&M; Alabama A&M/Samford Multi-Team Event	W 80–75	3–2	Alabama A&M Events Center (1,123); Huntsville, AL
November 25, 2022*; 2:00 p.m., ESPN+		at Samford; Alabama A&M/Samford Multi-Team Event	W 79–76	4–2	Pete Hanna Center (1,731); Homewood, AL
November 26, 2022*; 3:00 p.m.		vs. Tennessee Southern; Alabama A&M/Samford Multi-Team Event	W 91–47	5–2	Pete Hanna Center (133); Homewood, AL
December 2, 2022*; 6:00 p.m., ESPN+		Southern	W 74–59	6–2	Thomas Assembly Center (2,649); Ruston, LA
December 10, 2022*; 8:00 p.m., MW Network		at Wyoming	L 65–92	6–3	Arena-Auditorium (4,604); Laramie, WY
December 14, 2022*; 6:00 p.m., ESPNU		Stephen F. Austin	L 79–80 ^{OT}	6–4	Thomas Assembly Center (2,469); Ruston, LA
December 17, 2022; 7:00 p.m., CUSA.tv		at UTEP	L 55–60	6–5 (0–1)	Don Haskins Center (4,768); El Paso, TX
December 21, 2022*; 12:00 p.m., CUSA.tv		Jarvis Christian	W 108–52	7–5	Thomas Assembly Center (2,142); Ruston, LA
December 29, 2022; 6:00 p.m., ESPN+		UTSA	W 91–69	8–5 (1–1)	Thomas Assembly Center (2,704); Ruston, LA
December 31, 2022; 1:00 p.m., ESPN+		at Charlotte	L 66–68	8–6 (1–2)	Dale F. Halton Arena (2,372); Charlotte, NC
January 5, 2023; 7:00 p.m., ESPN+		at Rice	W 88–82 ^{OT}	9–6 (2–2)	Tudor Fieldhouse (1,962); Houston, TX
January 7, 2023; 2:00 p.m., CUSA.tv		UTEP	W 60–58	10–6 (3–2)	Thomas Assembly Center (2,435); Ruston, LA
January 11, 2023; 7:00 p.m., ESPN+		at North Texas	L 65–67	10–7 (3–3)	The Super Pit (3,633); Denton, TX
January 14, 2023; 3:00 p.m., Stadium		UAB	L 74–81	10–8 (3–4)	Thomas Assembly Center (3,490); Ruston, LA
January 19, 2023; 8:00 p.m., CBSSN		Western Kentucky	W 85–74 ^{OT}	11–8 (4–4)	Thomas Assembly Center (2,497); Ruston, LA
January 21, 2023; 4:00 p.m., ESPN+		Middle Tennessee	L 51–68	11–9 (4–5)	Thomas Assembly Center (2,709); Ruston, LA
January 26, 2023; 8:00 p.m., CBSSN		at UAB	L 59–65	11–10 (4–6)	Bartow Arena (4,015); Birmingham, AL
January 28, 2023; 3:00 p.m., ESPN+		at UTSA	W 66–55	12–10 (2–6)	Convocation Center (1,568); San Antonio, TX
February 2, 2023; 6:00 p.m., ESPN+		Rice	W 80–72	13–10 (6–6)	Thomas Assembly Center (2,356); Ruston, LA
February 9, 2023; 6:00 p.m., ESPN+		at FIU	L 62–66	13–11 (6–7)	Ocean Bank Convocation Center (1,170); Miami, FL
February 11, 2023; 1:00 p.m., ESPN+		at Florida Atlantic	L 85–90 ^{OT}	13–12 (6–8)	Eleanor R. Baldwin Arena (2,982); Boca Raton, FL
February 16, 2023; 6:00 p.m., ESPN+		North Texas	L 62–72	13–13 (6–9)	Thomas Assembly Center (2,640); Ruston, LA
February 18, 2023; 2:00 p.m., ESPN+		Charlotte	L 67–74	13–14 (6–10)	Thomas Assembly Center (2,326); Ruston, LA
February 23, 2023; 8:00 p.m., CBSSN		at Western Kentucky	L 66–76	13–15 (6–11)	E. A. Diddle Arena (3,156); Bowling Green, KY
February 25, 2023; 3:00 p.m., Stadium		at Middle Tennessee	L 49–63	13–16 (6–12)	Murphy Center (4,179); Murfreesboro, TN
March 2, 2023; 6:00 p.m., ESPN+		FIU	W 77–76 ^{OT}	14–16 (7–12)	Thomas Assembly Center (1,867); Ruston, LA
March 4, 2023; 2:00 p.m., ESPN+		Florida Atlantic	L 72–76	14–17 (7–13)	Thomas Assembly Center (2,326); Ruston, LA
Conference USA tournament
March 8, 2023; 8:00 p.m., ESPN+	(10)	vs. (7) FIU; First round	W 81–76 ^{OT}	15–17	Ford Center at The Star; Frisco, TX
March 9, 2023; 8:00 p.m., ESPN+	(10)	vs. (2) North Texas; Quarterfinals	L 46–74	15–18	Ford Center at The Star (2,765); Frisco, TX
*Non-conference game. ^{#}Rankings from AP Poll. (#) Tournament seedings in parentheses. All times are in Central.

== See also ==
- 2022-23 Louisiana Tech Lady Techsters basketball team
