= 2022–23 Charlotte 49ers men's basketball team =

American college basketball season

2022–23 Charlotte 49ers men's basketball

CBI champions
- Conference: Conference USA
- Record: 22–14 (9–11 C-USA)
- Head coach: Ron Sanchez (5th season)
- Associate head coach: Aaron Fearne
- Assistant coaches: Vic Sfera; Kevin Smith
- Home arena: Dale F. Halton Arena

2022–23 Conference USA men's basketball standings
	Conf.				Overall
Team	W		L	PCT	W		L	PCT
No. 25 Florida Atlantic †	18	–	2	.900	35	–	4	.897
North Texas	16	–	4	.800	31	–	7	.816
UAB	14	–	6	.700	29	–	10	.744
Middle Tennessee	11	–	9	.550	19	–	14	.576
Charlotte	9	–	11	.450	22	–	14	.611
Rice	8	–	12	.400	19	–	16	.543
FIU	8	–	12	.400	14	–	18	.438
Western Kentucky	8	–	12	.400	17	–	16	.515
UTEP	7	–	13	.350	14	–	18	.438
Louisiana Tech	7	–	13	.350	15	–	18	.455
UTSA	4	–	16	.200	10	–	22	.313
† 2023 C-USA tournament winner Rankings from AP poll

The 2022–23 Charlotte 49ers men's basketball team represented the University of North Carolina at Charlotte during the 2022–23 NCAA Division I men's basketball season. The team was led by fifth-year head coach Ron Sanchez, and played their home games at Dale F. Halton Arena in Charlotte, North Carolina as members of Conference USA (C-USA). They finished the season 18–13, 9–11 in C-USA play, to finish in fifth place, and lost to Middle Tennessee in the first round of the C-USA tournament. Despite this, the 49ers received an invitation to the College Basketball Invitational, marking their first participation in the CBI and their first invite to a postseason tournament since 2013. In the CBI, Charlotte defeated Western Carolina, Milwaukee and Radford to reach the championship game, where they defeated Eastern Kentucky to win their first-ever postseason tournament.

This season marked the team's last as members of Conference USA before joining the American Athletic Conference on July 1, 2023.

== Previous season ==
The 49ers finished the 2021–22 season with a record of 17–14, 10–8 in C-USA play, to finish in fourth place in East Division. They lost in the second round of the C-USA tournament to Rice. The team did not play in a postseason tournament.

== Offseason ==
=== Departures ===
Name	Number	Pos.	Height	Weight	Year	Hometown	Reason for departure
Clyde Trapp Jr.	0	G	6' 4"	200	GS Senior	Eastover, SC	Graduated
Jahmir Young	1	G	6' 1"	185	Junior	Upper Marlboro, MD	Transferred to Maryland
Austin Butler	2	G	6' 5"	210	GS Senior	Latrobe, PA	Graduated
Marvin Cannon	5	G	6' 5"	170	RS Senior	Richmond, VA	Graduated
Perry Francois	10	F	6' 8"	240	GS Senior	North Miami, FL	Graduated
Jared Garcia	25	F	6' 8"	240	Sophomore	Houston, TX	Transferred to Salt Lake CC
Luka Vasic	35	G	6' 8"	205	RS Senior	Pirot, Serbia	Graduate transferred to Texas A&M–Commerce
Eli Bennett	44	G	6' 2"	160	Freshman	Charlottesville, VA	Walk-on; left the team for personal reasons

=== Incoming transfers ===
Name	Number	Pos.	Height	Weight	Year	Hometown	Previous school
Montre Gipson	1	G	5' 11"	200	GS Senior	DeSoto, TX	Tarleton State
Josh Aldrich	22	G/F	6' 8"	224	GS Senior	Wilmington, NC	USC Upstate
Igor Miličić Jr.	24	G/F	6' 10"	224	Sophomore	Rovinj, Croatia	Virginia
Lu'Cye Patterson	25	G	6' 1"	209	Junior	Minneapolis, MN	Missouri State

=== 2022 recruiting class ===
College recruiting information
Name	Hometown	School	Height	Weight	Commit date
Nik Graves; PG	Greensboro, NC	Greensboro Day School	6 ft 2 in (1.88 m)	170 lb (77 kg)	Oct 15, 2021
Nik Graves; PG	Recruit ratings: No ratings found				
Rich Rolf; PF	Centerville, OH	Centerville High School	6 ft 7 in (2.01 m)	195 lb (88 kg)	Aug 23, 2022
Rich Rolf; PF	Recruit ratings: No ratings found				
Overall recruit ranking:
Note: In many cases, Scout, Rivals, 247Sports, On3, and ESPN may conflict in their listings of height and weight.; In these cases, the average was taken. ESPN grades are on a 100-point scale.; Sources: "2022 Team Ranking". Rivals.

== Roster ==
2022–23 Charlotte 49ers men's basketball team
Players
Coaches

Pos.	#	Name	Height	Weight	Year	Previous school	Hometown
F	0	Rich Wolf	6 ft 7 in (2.01 m)	195 lb (88 kg)	Fr	Centerville HS	Centerville, OH
G	1	Montre Gipson	5 ft 11 in (1.8 m)	200 lb (91 kg)	GS	Waxahachie HS; Tarleton State	DeSoto, TX
G	3	Brice Williams	6 ft 7 in (2.01 m)	215 lb (98 kg)	RS Jr	Hopewell HS	Huntersville, NC
G	5	Isaiah Folkes	6 ft 4 in (1.93 m)	190 lb (86 kg)	RS So	Middleburg Academy	Gainesville, VA
G	10	Nik Graves	6 ft 3 in (1.91 m)	170 lb (77 kg)	Fr	Greensboro Day School	Durham, NC
G	11	Daylen Berry	6 ft 4 in (1.93 m)	170 lb (77 kg)	RS Fr	Panther Creek HS	Cary, NC
G	12	Jackson Threadgill	6 ft 6 in (1.98 m)	170 lb (77 kg)	Jr	Davidson Day School	Concord, NC
G	14	Regin Larson (W)	6 ft 6 in (1.98 m)	185 lb (84 kg)	Sr	Hickory Grove Christian School; Pfeiffer	Charlotte, NC
F/C	15	Aly Khalifa	6 ft 11 in (2.11 m)	230 lb (104 kg)	RS So	NBA Global Academy	Alexandria, Egypt
F	20	Robert V Braswell	6 ft 7 in (2.01 m)	205 lb (93 kg)	RS Sr	Blythewood HS; Syracuse	Jacksonville, FL
G	21	Musa Jallow	6 ft 5 in (1.96 m)	210 lb (95 kg)	GS	Bloomington North HS; Ohio State	Bloomington, IN
G/F	22	Josh Aldrich	6 ft 8 in (2.03 m)	224 lb (102 kg)	Sr	New Hanover HS; USC Upstate	Wilmington, NC
F	24	Igor Miličić Jr.	6 ft 10 in (2.08 m)	225 lb (102 kg)	So	OrangeAcademy/Ratiopharm Ulm; Virginia	Rovinj, Croatia
G	25	Lu'Cye Patterson	6 ft 1 in (1.85 m)	209 lb (95 kg)	Jr	Minnesota Prep Academy; Missouri State	Minneapolis, MN
G	30	Tyler Ferne (W)	6 ft 6 in (1.98 m)	175 lb (79 kg)	So	Concord Academy (NC)	Cairns, Australia

Head coach

- Ron Sanchez (SUNY Oneonta)

Assistant coach(es)

- Aaron Fearne (Mayville State)
- Vic Sfera (Memphis)
- Kevin Smith (Richmond)

Legend

- (C) Team captain
- (S) Suspended
- (I) Ineligible
- (W) Walk-on
- Injured
- Current redshirt

Roster
Last update: September 11, 2025

== Schedule and results ==
Date time, TV	Rank^{#}	Opponent^{#}	Result	Record	Site (attendance) city, state
Non-conference regular season
November 7, 2022*; 6:00 p.m., ESPN+		Coppin State	W 82–59	1–0	Dale F. Halton Arena (2,638); Charlotte, NC
November 14, 2022*; 7:00 p.m., ESPN+		Maryland Eastern Shore	W 80–47	2–0	Dale F. Halton Arena (2,929); Charlotte, NC
November 17, 2022*; 7:00 p.m., ESPNews		vs. Boise State; Myrtle Beach Invitational quarterfinals	W 54–42	3–0	HTC Center (1,123); Myrtle Beach, SC
November 18, 2022*; 7:00 p.m., ESPNU		vs. Tulsa; Myrtle Beach Invitational semifinals	W 68–65	4–0	HTC Center (1,306); Myrtle Beach, SC
November 20, 2022*; 1:00p.m., ESPN2		vs. UMass; Myrtle Beach Invitational championship	L 54–60	4–1	HTC Center (1,349); Myrtle Beach, SC
November 23, 2022*; 12:00 p.m., ESPN+		at Detroit Mercy	L 49–70	4–2	Calihan Hall (1,707); Detroit, MI
November 26, 2022*; 4:00 p.m., ESPN+		Presbyterian	W 69–42	5–2	Dale F. Halton Arena (2,104); Charlotte, NC
November 29, 2022*; 7:00 p.m., ESPN+		at Davidson	W 68–66 ^{OT}	6–2	John M. Belk Arena (3,238); Davidson, NC
December 2, 2022*; 7:00 p.m., ESPN+		Appalachian State	W 71–62	7–2	Dale F. Halton Arena (5,148); Charlotte, NC
December 10, 2022*; 2:00 p.m., ESPN+		Detroit Mercy	W 82–80 ^{OT}	8–2	Dale F. Halton Arena (2,704); Charlotte, NC
December 17, 2022*; 4:00 p.m., FloSports		at Monmouth	W 80–46	9–2	OceanFirst Bank Center (1,470); West Long Branch, NJ
Conference USA regular season
December 22, 2022; 7:30 p.m., ESPN+		at UAB	L 68–76	9–3 (0–1)	Bartow Arena (3,323); Birmingham, AL
December 29, 2022; 6:00 p.m., ESPN+		Middle Tennessee	W 82–67	10–3 (1–1)	Dale F. Halton Arena (2,480); Charlotte, NC
December 31, 2022; 2:00 p.m., ESPN+		Louisiana Tech	W 68–66	11–3 (2–1)	Dale F. Halton Arena (2,372); Charlotte, NC
January 5, 2023; 7:00 p.m., ESPN+		at FIU	L 60–62	11–4 (2–2)	Ocean Bank Convocation Center (819); Miami, FL
January 7, 2023; 2:00 p.m., CUSA.tv		at Florida Atlantic	L 67–71	11–5 (2–3)	Eleanor R. Baldwin Arena (1,816); Boca Raton, FL
January 14, 2023; 2:00 p.m., ESPN+		UTSA	W 72–54	12–5 (3–3)	Dale F. Halton Arena (3,189); Charlotte, NC
January 16, 2023; 4:00 p.m., ESPN+		UTEP	L 58–60	12–6 (3–4)	Dale F. Halton Arena (3,045); Charlotte, NC
January 19, 2023; 7:00 p.m., ESPN+		at Middle Tennessee	L 58–62	12–7 (3–5)	Murphy Center (3,304); Murfreesboro, TN
January 21, 2023; 7:00 p.m., ESPN+		at Western Kentucky	W 75–71	13–7 (4–5)	E. A. Diddle Arena (4,793); Bowling Green, KY
January 26, 2023; 8:00 p.m., ESPN+		at Rice	L 63–65	13–8 (4–6)	Tudor Fieldhouse (1,665); Houston, TX
February 2, 2023; 7:00 p.m., ESPN+		FIU	L 54–57	13–9 (4–7)	Dale F. Halton Arena (3,073); Charlotte, NC
February 4, 2023; 4:00 p.m., ESPN+		No. 19 Florida Atlantic	L 52–67	13–10 (4–8)	Dale F. Halton Arena (4,037); Charlotte, NC
February 9, 2023; 9:00 p.m., ESPN+		at UTEP	W 62–53	14–10 (5–8)	Don Haskins Center (3,768); El Paso, TX
February 11, 2023; 9:00 p.m., ESPN+		at North Texas	L 43–67	14–11 (5–9)	The Super Pit (4,123); Denton, TX
February 16, 2023; 7:00 p.m., ESPN+		Western Kentucky	W 68–64 ^{OT}	15–11 (6–9)	Dale F. Halton Arena (2,674); Charlotte, NC
February 18, 2023; 3:00 p.m., ESPN+		at Louisiana Tech	W 74–67	16–11 (7–9)	Thomas Assembly Center (2,326); Ruston, LA
February 23, 2023; 7:00 p.m., ESPN+		North Texas	W 55–49	17–11 (8–9)	Dale F. Halton Arena (3,015); Charlotte, NC
February 25, 2023; 4:00 p.m., ESPN+		Rice	W 70–54	18–11 (9–9)	Dale F. Halton Arena (2,837); Charlotte, NC
March 2, 2023; 8:00 p.m., ESPN+		at UTSA	L 73–78	18–12 (9–10)	Convocation Center (1,249); San Antonio, TX
March 4, 2023; 1:00 p.m., ESPN+		UAB	L 91–93 ^{2OT}	18–13 (9–11)	Dale F. Halton Arena (2,534); Charlotte, NC
Conference USA tournament
March 9, 2023; 7:00 p.m., ESPN+	(5)	vs. (4) Middle Tennessee; Quarterfinals	L 65–66	18–14	Ford Center at The Star (1,773); Frisco, TX
CBI
March 18, 2023; 7:30 p.m., FloHoops	(3)	vs. (14) Western Carolina; First round	W 65–56	19–14	Ocean Center (876); Daytona Beach, FL
March 20, 2023; 6:30 p.m., FloHoops	(3)	vs. (11) Milwaukee; Quarterfinals	W 76–65	20–14	Ocean Center (764); Daytona Beach, FL
March 21, 2023; 9:30 p.m., ESPN2	(3)	vs. (10) Radford; Semifinals	W 63–56	21–14	Ocean Center (962); Daytona Beach, FL
March 22, 2023; 5:00 p.m., ESPN2	(3)	vs. (8) Eastern Kentucky; Championship	W 71–68	22–14	Ocean Center (771); Daytona Beach, FL
*Non-conference game. ^{#}Rankings from AP poll. (#) Tournament seedings in parentheses. All times are in Eastern.
