= 2022–23 Middle Tennessee Blue Raiders men's basketball team =

American college basketball season

2022–23 Middle Tennessee Blue Raiders men's basketball
- Conference: Conference USA
- Record: 19–14 (11–9 CUSA)
- Head coach: Nick McDevitt (5th season)
- Associate head coach: Wes Long
- Assistant coaches: Logan Johnson; Eric Wilson
- Home arena: Murphy Center

2022–23 Conference USA men's basketball standings
	Conf.				Overall
Team	W		L	PCT	W		L	PCT
No. 25 Florida Atlantic †	18	–	2	.900	35	–	4	.897
North Texas	16	–	4	.800	31	–	7	.816
UAB	14	–	6	.700	29	–	10	.744
Middle Tennessee	11	–	9	.550	19	–	14	.576
Charlotte	9	–	11	.450	22	–	14	.611
Rice	8	–	12	.400	19	–	16	.543
FIU	8	–	12	.400	14	–	18	.438
Western Kentucky	8	–	12	.400	17	–	16	.515
UTEP	7	–	13	.350	14	–	18	.438
Louisiana Tech	7	–	13	.350	15	–	18	.455
UTSA	4	–	16	.200	10	–	22	.313
† 2023 C-USA tournament winner Rankings from AP poll

The 2022–23 Middle Tennessee Blue Raiders men's basketball team represented Middle Tennessee State University during the 2022–23 NCAA Division I men's basketball season. The team was led by fifth-year head coach Nick McDevitt, and played their home games at Murphy Center in Murfreesboro, Tennessee as members of Conference USA (C-USA).

== Previous season ==
The Blue Raiders finished the 2021–22 season 26–11, 13–5 in C-USA play to finish to win the East Division. They defeated UTEP in quarterfinals of the C-USA tournament before losing to UAB in the semifinals. They were invited to the CBI, where they defeated California Baptist, Boston University and Abilene Christian to advance to the championship game, where they lost to UNC Wilmington.

== Offseason ==
=== Departures ===
Name	Number	Pos.	Height	Weight	Year	Hometown	Reason for departure
Isaiah Turner	0	F	6'9"	240	Junior	Auburndale, FL	Transferred
Donovan Sims	3	G	6'1"	160	RS senior	Murfreesboro, TN	Graduated
Josh Jefferson	11	G	6'2"	190	RS senior	New Albany, IN	Graduated
Jaellan White	13	G	6'0"	190	RS senior	Murfreesboro, TN	Walk-on; graduated

=== Incoming transfers ===
Name	Number	Pos.	Height	Weight	Year	Hometown	Previous school
Jestin Porter	3	G	6'1'	180	Sophomore	Houston, TX	Tyler JC
TreVon Smith	13	G	6'3"	180	Sophomore	Campbellsville, KY	Wabash Valley College
Isiah Lightsy	20	G	6'4"		Sophomore	Murfreesboro, TN	Walk-on; Chattanooga State CC

=== 2022 recruiting class ===
College recruiting
Name	Hometown	School	Height	Weight	Commit date
Tre Green; SG	Baltimore, MD	Glenelg Country School	6 ft 3 in (1.91 m)	185 lb (84 kg)	Apr 22, 2022
Tre Green; SG	Recruit ratings: Scout: Rivals: 247Sports: (NR)				
Overall recruit ranking:
Note: In many cases, Scout, Rivals, 247Sports, On3, and ESPN may conflict in their listings of height and weight.; In these cases, the average was taken. ESPN grades are on a 100-point scale.; Sources: "2022 Team Ranking". Rivals.

== Roster ==
2022–23 Middle Tennessee Blue Raiders men's basketball team
Players
Coaches

Pos.	#	Name	Height	Weight	Year	Previous school	Hometown
F	1	Tyler Millin	6 ft 7 in (2.01 m)	205 lb (93 kg)	Jr	The Skill Factory	Calera, AL
F	2	DeAndre Dishman	6 ft 6 in (1.98 m)	235 lb (107 kg)	RS Sr	Bryan Station HS; Eastern Kentucky	Lexington, KY
G	3	Jestin Porter	6 ft 1 in (1.85 m)	180 lb (82 kg)	So	Cypress Ridge HS; Tyler JC	Houston, TX
G	4	Justin Bufford	6 ft 6 in (1.98 m)	185 lb (84 kg)	So	Montgomery Catholic; Shelton State CC	Selma, AL
G	5	Eli Lawrence	6 ft 5 in (1.96 m)	185 lb (84 kg)	Jr	Washington Academy (NC)	Atlanta, GA
F	10	Elias King	6 ft 8 in (2.03 m)	190 lb (86 kg)	Jr	Lincoln Academy; Mississippi State	Atlanta, GA
G	11	Tre Green	6 ft 3 in (1.91 m)	185 lb (84 kg)	Fr	Glenelg Country School	Baltimore, MD
G	12	Teafale Lenard Jr.	6 ft 7 in (2.01 m)	175 lb (79 kg)	So	Link Year Prep (MO)	Snyder, TX
G	13	TreVon Smith	6 ft 3 in (1.91 m)	175 lb (79 kg)	Jr	Taylor County HS; Wabash Valley College	Campbellsville, KY
G	14	Jalen Jordan	6 ft 2 in (1.88 m)	160 lb (73 kg)	RS Jr	Rockdale County HS; St. Francis Brooklyn	Conyers, GA
F	15	Christian Fussell	6 ft 10 in (2.08 m)	220 lb (100 kg)	RS So	Greenforest Christian Academy	Decatur, GA
G	20	Isiah Lightsy (W)	6 ft 4 in (1.93 m)	185 lb (84 kg)	So	Siegel; Chattanooga State	Murfreesboro, TN
G	24	Camryn Weston	6 ft 3 in (1.91 m)	190 lb (86 kg)	Jr	Westover HS; Southeastern CC	Albany, GA
F	31	Jared Coleman-Jones	6 ft 10 in (2.08 m)	250 lb (113 kg)	So	McEarhern HS; Northwestern	Hiram, GA
G	55	Jack Jubenville (W)	6 ft 0 in (1.83 m)	170 lb (77 kg)	RS Fr	Middle Tennessee Christian	Murfreesboro, TN

Head coach

- Nick McDevitt (UNC Asheville)

Assistant coach(es)

- Wes Long (Clemson)
- Logan Johnson (Coastal Carolina)
- Eric Wilson (Western Carolina)

Legend

- (C) Team captain
- (S) Suspended
- (I) Ineligible
- (W) Walk-on
- Injured
- Current redshirt

Roster

== Schedule and results ==
Date time, TV	Rank^{#}	Opponent^{#}	Result	Record	Site (attendance) city, state
Regular season
November 7, 2022*; 11:00 a.m., ESPN+		Brescia	W 79–52	1–0	Murphy Center (7,047); Murfreesboro, TN
November 12, 2022*; 3:00 p.m., ESPN+		at Winthrop	L 68–76	1–1	Winthrop Coliseum (1,642); Rock Hill, SC
November 15, 2022; 6:00 p.m., ESPN+		Rice	W 81–46	2–1 (1–0)	Murphy Center (2,802); Murfreesboro, TN
November 19, 2022*; 2:00 p.m., ESPN+		at Missouri State	L 51–75	2–2	JQH Arena (3,003); Springfield, MO
November 25, 2022*; 6:00 p.m.		vs. Hofstra; Northern Classic	W 64–54	3–2	Place Bell; Laval, QC
November 26, 2022*; 3:30 p.m.		vs. Stephen F. Austin; Northern Classic	W 75–63	4–2	Place Bell; Laval, QC
November 27, 2022*; 12:30 p.m.		vs. Montana State; Northern Classic	W 72–71	5–2	Place Bell; Laval, QC
November 30, 2022*; 6:00 p.m., ESPN+		at St. Bonaventure	L 64–71	5–3	Reilly Center (3,089); Olean, NY
December 3, 2022*; 2:00 p.m., ESPN+		Maryville	W 69–46	6–3	Murphy Center (2,138); Murfreesboro, TN
December 10, 2022*; 4:00 p.m., ESPN+		at Belmont	W 85–75 ^{OT}	7–3	Curb Event Center (2,087); Nashville, TN
December 15, 2022*; 6:00 p.m., ESPN+		Chattanooga	L 73–82	7–4	Murphy Center (5,832); Murfreesboro, TN
December 21, 2022*; 6:00 p.m., ESPN+		Murray State	W 83–67	8–4	Murphy Center (2,857); Murfreesboro, TN
December 29, 2022; 5:00 p.m., ESPN+		at Charlotte	L 67–82	8–5 (1–1)	Dale F. Halton Arena (2,480); Charlotte, NC
December 31, 2022; 3:00 p.m., CBSSN		Western Kentucky	W 65–60	9–5 (2–1)	Murphy Center (3,124); Murfreesboro, TN
January 5, 2023; 7:00 p.m., ESPN+		at UTSA	L 72–75	9–6 (2–2)	Convocation Center (708); San Antonio, TX
January 7, 2023; 5:00 p.m., ESPN+		North Texas	L 51–56	9–7 (2–3)	Murphy Center (3,148); Murfreesboro, TN
January 11, 2023; 7:00 p.m., ESPN+		at Rice	W 71–68	10–7 (3–3)	Tudor Fieldhouse (2,010); Houston, TX
January 16, 2023; 8:00 p.m., CBSSN		UAB	W 74–73 ^{OT}	11–7 (4–3)	Murphy Center (3,224); Murfreesboro, TN
January 19, 2023; 6:00 p.m., ESPN+		Charlotte	W 62–58	12–7 (5–3)	Murphy Center (3,304); Murfreesboro, TN
January 21, 2023; 4:00 p.m., ESPN+		at Louisiana Tech	W 68–51	13–7 (6–3)	Thomas Assembly Center (2,709); Ruston, LA
January 26, 2023; 6:00 p.m., CBSSN		at No. 21 Florida Atlantic	L 67–85	13–8 (6–4)	Eleanor R. Baldwin Arena (3,082); Boca Raton, FL
January 28, 2023; 6:00 p.m., CUSATV		at FIU	L 74–82	13–9 (6–5)	Ocean Bank Convocation Center (1,311); Miami, FL
February 2, 2023; 8:00 p.m., ESPNU		UTEP	W 84–72	14–9 (7–5)	Murphy Center (2,806); Murfreesboro, TN
February 4, 2023; 5:00 p.m., ESPN+		UTSA	W 84-60	15–9 (8–5)	Murphy Center (3,425); Murfreesboro, TN
February 9, 2023; 7:00 p.m., CBSSN		at Western Kentucky	L 89-93	15–10 (8–6)	E. A. Diddle Arena (4,019); Bowling Green, KY
February 11, 2023; 3:00 p.m., Stadium		at UAB	L 69-92	15–11 (8–7)	Bartow Arena (4,957); Birmingham, AL
February 16, 2023; 6:00 p.m., CBSSN		No. 25 Florida Atlantic	W 74–70	16–11 (9–7)	Murphy Center (3,402); Murfreesboro, TN
February 18, 2023; 5:00 p.m., ESPN+		FIU	W 69–58	17–11 (10–7)	Murphy Center (3,911); Murfreesboro, TN
February 25, 2023; 3:00 p.m., Stadium		Louisiana Tech	W 63–49	18–11 (11–7)	Murphy Center (4,179); Murfreesboro, TN
March 2, 2023; 7:00 p.m., CBSSN		at North Texas	L 50–64	18–12 (11–8)	The Super Pit (4,076); Denton, TX
March 4, 2023; 3:00 p.m., ESPN+		at UTEP	L 65–77	18–13 (11–9)	Don Haskins Center; El Paso, TX
Conference USA tournament
March 9, 2023; 7:00 p.m., ESPN+	(4)	vs. (5) Charlotte; Quarterfinals	W 66–65	19–13	Ford Center at The Star (1,773); Frisco, TX
March 10, 2023; 11:30 a.m., CBSSN	(4)	vs. (1) Florida Atlantic; Semifinals	L 65–68	19–14	Ford Center at The Star; Frisco, TX
*Non-conference game. ^{#}Rankings from AP Poll. (#) Tournament seedings in parentheses. All times are in Central.

== See also ==
- 2022–23 Middle Tennessee Blue Raiders women's basketball team
