= 2022–23 FIU Panthers men's basketball team =

American college basketball season

2022–23 FIU Panthers men's basketball
- Conference: Conference USA
- Record: 14–18 (8–12 C-USA)
- Head coach: Jeremy Ballard (5th season)
- Associate head coach: Jesse Bopp
- Assistant coaches: Joey Rodriguez; Zavier Anderson
- Home arena: Ocean Bank Convocation Center

2022–23 Conference USA men's basketball standings
	Conf.				Overall
Team	W		L	PCT	W		L	PCT
No. 25 Florida Atlantic †	18	–	2	.900	35	–	4	.897
North Texas	16	–	4	.800	31	–	7	.816
UAB	14	–	6	.700	29	–	10	.744
Middle Tennessee	11	–	9	.550	19	–	14	.576
Charlotte	9	–	11	.450	22	–	14	.611
Rice	8	–	12	.400	19	–	16	.543
FIU	8	–	12	.400	14	–	18	.438
Western Kentucky	8	–	12	.400	17	–	16	.515
UTEP	7	–	13	.350	14	–	18	.438
Louisiana Tech	7	–	13	.350	15	–	18	.455
UTSA	4	–	16	.200	10	–	22	.313
† 2023 C-USA tournament winner Rankings from AP poll

The 2022–23 FIU Panthers men's basketball team represented Florida International University in the 2022–23 NCAA Division I men's basketball season. The Panthers, led by fifth-year head coach Jeremy Ballard, played their home games at Ocean Bank Convocation Center in Miami, Florida as members of Conference USA (C-USA).

The Panthers finished the season 14–18, 8–12 in C-USA play, to finish in a three-way tie for sixth place. As a No. 7 seed, they lost in the first round of the C-USA tournament to Louisiana Tech.

== Previous season ==
The Panthers finished the 2021–22 season 15–17, 5–13 in C-USA play, to finish in sixth place in East Division. Their lost in the first round of the C-USA tournament to Marshall.

== Offseason ==
=== Departures ===
Name	Number	Pos.	Height	Weight	Year	Hometown	Reason for departure
Tevin Brewer	0	G	5' 8"	160	RS Senior	Fort Smith, AR	Graduate transferred to Duquesne
Isaiah Banks	1	G	6' 5"	180	RS Senior	Conyers, GA	Graduated
Eric Lovett	4	G/F	6' 5"	200	RS Senior	Jonesboro, GA	Graduated
CJ Kelley	5	F	6' 8"	185	Freshman	Texarkana, TX	Transferred to McLennan CC
Aquan Smart	10	G	6' 3"	175	Sophomore	Evanston, IL	Transferred to Southeast Missouri State
Victor Hart	11	F	6' 8"	200	Junior	Miami, FL	Transferred to Southern Miss
Clevon Brown	15	F	6' 8"	232	RS Senior	San Antonio, TX	Graduated
James Ametepe	20	F	6' 5"	210	Senior	Accra, Ghana	Walk-on; left the team for personal reasons
Daniel Parrish	24	G	6' 3"	180	RS Junior	Aiken, SC	Transferred to USC Aiken

=== Incoming transfers ===
Name	Number	Pos.	Height	Weight	Year	Hometown	Previous school
Nick Guadarrama	0	F	6' 5"	250	GS Senior	Newington, CT	New Hampshire
Austin Williams	20	G	6' 4"	200	GS Senior	Roseland, NJ	Hartford
John Williams Jr.	21	G	6' 4"	190	GS Senior	Augusta, GA	Glenville State

=== 2022 recruiting class ===
College recruiting information
Name	Hometown	School	Height	Weight	Commit date
Da'Shon Gittens; PG	Woodstock, CT	Woodstock Academy	6 ft 2 in (1.88 m)	160 lb (73 kg)	Sep 8, 2021
Da'Shon Gittens; PG	Recruit ratings: (70)				
Jayden Brewer; SG	Lincolnton, NC	Combine Academy	6 ft 5 in (1.96 m)	170 lb (77 kg)	Nov 29, 2021
Jayden Brewer; SG	Recruit ratings: Rivals:				
Da'Shon Gittens; C	Philadelphia, PA	Mathematics, Civics and Sciences Charter School	7 ft 0 in (2.13 m)	200 lb (91 kg)	Oct 2, 2021
Da'Shon Gittens; C	Recruit ratings: No ratings found				
Arturo Dean; PG	Miami, FL	South Miami Senior High School	5 ft 9 in (1.75 m)	145 lb (66 kg)	
Arturo Dean; PG	Recruit ratings: No ratings found				
Overall recruit ranking:
Note: In many cases, Scout, Rivals, 247Sports, On3, and ESPN may conflict in their listings of height and weight.; In these cases, the average was taken. ESPN grades are on a 100-point scale.; Sources: "2022 Team Ranking". Rivals.

== Roster ==
2022–23 FIU Panthers men's basketball team
Players
Coaches

Pos.	#	Name	Height	Weight	Year	Previous school	Hometown
F	0	Nick Guadarrama	6 ft 5 in (1.96 m)	250 lb (113 kg)	GS	Perkiomen School; New Hampshire	Newington, CT
G	1	Dashon Gittens	6 ft 3 in (1.91 m)	178 lb (81 kg)	Fr	Putnam Science Academy	Hartford, CT
G	2	Denver Jones	6 ft 4 in (1.93 m)	195 lb (88 kg)	So	Memphis Day Academy; Garden City CC	New Market, AL
G	3	Javaunte Hawkins	5 ft 11 in (1.8 m)	160 lb (73 kg)	Jr	Lee's Summit North HS; Butler CC	Lee's Summit, MO
G	4	Arturo Dean	5 ft 11 in (1.8 m)	163 lb (74 kg)	Fr	Putnam Science Academy	Miami, FL
G	11	Jayden Brewer	6 ft 6 in (1.98 m)	155 lb (70 kg)	Fr	Combine Academy	Indianapolis, IN
G/F	12	Dante Wilcox	6 ft 6 in (1.98 m)	220 lb (100 kg)	RS Jr	Oxbridge Academy	West Palm Beach, FL
C	15	Darryon Prescott	7 ft 0 in (2.13 m)	216 lb (98 kg)	Fr	Math Civics and Sciences	Philadelphia, PA
G	20	Austin Williams	6 ft 4 in (1.93 m)	200 lb (91 kg)	GS	Seton Hall Prep; Hartford	Roseland, NJ
G	21	John Jr. Williams	6 ft 4 in (1.93 m)	190 lb (86 kg)	GS	T. W. Josey; Hartford	Augusta, GA
G	23	Petar Krivokapic	6 ft 4 in (1.93 m)	200 lb (91 kg)	So	Miami Prep School	Budva, Montenegro
G	24	Jaden Grant (W)	5 ft 11 in (1.8 m)	161 lb (73 kg)	So	NSU University School	Davie, FL
G	25	Cameron Wilson (W)	6 ft 0 in (1.83 m)	160 lb (73 kg)	So	Rockdale HS	Conyers, GA
F	33	Mohamed Sanogo	6 ft 9 in (2.06 m)	200 lb (91 kg)	So	Putnam Science Academy	Pittsfield, MA
C	44	Seth Pinkney	7 ft 1 in (2.16 m)	200 lb (91 kg)	Jr	Montverde Academy; Quinnipiac	Warminster, PA

Head coach

- Jeremy Ballard (Colgate)

Assistant coach(es)

- Jesse Bopp (Plymouth State)
- Joey Rodriguez (VCU)
- Zavier Anderson (Clemson)

Legend

- (C) Team captain
- (S) Suspended
- (I) Ineligible
- (W) Walk-on
- Injured
- Current redshirt

Roster

== Schedule and results ==
Date time, TV	Rank^{#}	Opponent^{#}	Result	Record	Site (attendance) city, state
Regular season
November 7, 2022*; 7:00 p.m., CUSA.tv		Houston Christian	W 77–66	1–0	Ocean Bank Convocation Center (1,104); Miami, FL
November 10, 2022*; 7:00 p.m., CUSA.tv		Florida Memorial	W 95–74	2–0	Ocean Bank Convocation Center (643); Miami, FL
November 15, 2022*; 9:00 p.m., ACC RSN		at NC State	L 74–107	2–1	PNC Arena (5,034); Raleigh, NC
November 19, 2022*; 7:00 p.m., CUSA.tv		Bryant	L 85–91	2–2	Ocean Bank Convocation Center (573); Miami, FL
November 23, 2022*; 7:00 p.m., CUSA.tv		Stony Brook; FIU Multi-Team Event	W 83–50	3–2	Ocean Bank Convocation Center (676); Miami, FL
November 27, 2022*; 6:00 p.m., CUSA.tv		Eastern Washington; FIU Multi-Team Event	W 90–79	4–2	Ocean Bank Convocation Center (310); Miami, FL
November 30, 2022*; 7:00 p.m., ESPN+		Eastern Michigan	L 68–80	4–3	Ocean Bank Convocation Center (1,150); Miami, FL
December 4, 2022*; 6:00 p.m., ESPN+		at Florida Gulf Coast	L 65–74	4–4	Alico Arena (2,033); Fort Myers, FL
December 13, 2022*; 8:00 p.m., HBCU Go		at Howard	L 59–71	4–6	Burr Gymnasium (654); Washington, D.C.
December 17, 2022; 2:00 p.m., CUSA.tv		at Florida Atlantic	L 53–79	4–6 (0–1)	Eleanor R. Baldwin Arena (1,797); Boca Raton, FL
December 21, 2022*; 7:00 p.m., CUSA.tv		Incarnate Word	W 79–74	5–6	Ocean Bank Convocation Center; Miami, FL
December 29, 2022*; 7:00 p.m., CUSA.tv		Florida College	W 69–64	6–6	Ocean Bank Convocation Center (848); Miami, FL
December 31, 2022; 4:00 p.m., ESPN+		at North Texas	L 57–72	6–7 (0–2)	The Super Pit (2,934); Denton, TX
January 5, 2023; 7:00 p.m., ESPN+		Charlotte	W 62–60	7–7 (1–2)	Ocean Bank Convocation Center (819); Miami, FL
January 7, 2023; 7:00 p.m., ESPN+		UAB	W 90–87 ^{OT}	8–7 (2–2)	Ocean Bank Convocation Center (1,152); Miami, FL
January 11, 2023; 7:30 p.m., ESPN+		Florida Atlantic	L 73–77 ^{OT}	8–8 (2–3)	Ocean Bank Convocation Center (2,244); Miami, FL
January 14, 2023; 7:00 p.m.		at Western Kentucky	L 59–70	8–9 (2–4)	E. A. Diddle Arena (4,743); Bowling Green, KY
January 16, 2023; 7:00 p.m., ESPN+		North Texas	L 57–64	8–10 (2–5)	Ocean Bank Convocation Center (1,183); Miami, FL
January 19, 2023; 9:00 p.m., ESPN+		at UTEP	L 61–81	8–11 (2–6)	Don Haskins Center (3,648); El Paso, TX
January 21, 2023; 4:00 p.m., ESPN+		at UTSA	W 77–72	9–11 (3–6)	Convocation Center (1,414); San Antonio, TX
January 26, 2023; 7:00 p.m., ESPN+		Western Kentucky	W 78–69	10–11 (4–6)	Ocean Bank Convocation Center (1,417); Miami, FL
January 28, 2023; 7:00 p.m., CUSA.tv		Middle Tennessee	W 82–74	11–11 (5–6)	Ocean Bank Convocation Center (1,311); Miami, FL
February 2, 2023; 7:00 p.m., ESPN+		at Charlotte	W 57–54	12–11 (6–6)	Dale F. Halton Arena (3,073); Charlotte, NC
February 4, 2023; 4:00 p.m., ESPN+		at UAB	L 72–76	12–12 (6–7)	Bartow Arena (5,318); Birmingham, AL
February 9, 2023; 7:00 p.m., ESPN+		Louisiana Tech	W 66–62	13–12 (7–7)	Ocean Bank Convocation Center (1,170); Miami, FL
February 11, 2023; 7:00 p.m., CUSA.tv		Rice	L 78–85	13–13 (7–8)	Ocean Bank Convocation Center (1,292); Miami, FL
February 18, 2023; 6:00 p.m.		at Middle Tennessee	L 58–69	13–14 (7–9)	Murphy Center (3,911); Murfreesboro, TN
February 23, 2023; 7:00 p.m., ESPN+		UTEP	L 82–87	13–15 (7–10)	Ocean Bank Convocation Center (1,219); Miami, FL
February 25, 2023; 7:00 p.m., CUSA.tv		UTSA	L 91–95	13–16 (7–11)	Ocean Bank Convocation Center (1,119); Miami, FL
March 2, 2023; 7:00 p.m., ESPN+		at Louisiana Tech	L 76–77 ^{OT}	13–17 (7–12)	Thomas Assembly Center (1,867); Ruston, LA
March 4, 2023; 3:00 p.m.		at Rice	W 90–83	14–17 (8–12)	Tudor Fieldhouse (2,760); Houston, TX
Conference USA tournament
March 8, 2023; 8:00 p.m., ESPN+	(7)	vs. (10) Louisiana Tech; First round	L 76–81 ^{OT}	14–18	Ford Center at The Star; Frisco, TX
*Non-conference game. ^{#}Rankings from AP poll. (#) Tournament seedings in parentheses. All times are in Eastern.
