= 2022–23 Florida Atlantic Owls men's basketball team =

American college basketball season

2022–23 Florida Atlantic Owls men's basketball

Conference USA regular season and tournament champions Paradise Invitational champions

NCAA tournament, Final Four
- Conference: Conference USA

Ranking
- Coaches: No. 5
- AP: No. 25
- Record: 35–4 (18–2 C-USA)
- Head coach: Dusty May (5th season)
- Assistant coaches: Kyle Church; Todd Abernethy; Drew Williamson
- Home arena: Eleanor R. Baldwin Arena

2022–23 Conference USA men's basketball standings
	Conf.				Overall
Team	W		L	PCT	W		L	PCT
No. 25 Florida Atlantic †	18	–	2	.900	35	–	4	.897
North Texas	16	–	4	.800	31	–	7	.816
UAB	14	–	6	.700	29	–	10	.744
Middle Tennessee	11	–	9	.550	19	–	14	.576
Charlotte	9	–	11	.450	22	–	14	.611
Rice	8	–	12	.400	19	–	16	.543
FIU	8	–	12	.400	14	–	18	.438
Western Kentucky	8	–	12	.400	17	–	16	.515
UTEP	7	–	13	.350	14	–	18	.438
Louisiana Tech	7	–	13	.350	15	–	18	.455
UTSA	4	–	16	.200	10	–	22	.313
† 2023 C-USA tournament winner Rankings from AP poll

The 2022–23 Florida Atlantic Owls men's basketball team represented Florida Atlantic University in the 2022–23 NCAA Division I men's basketball season. The Owls were led by fifth-year head coach Dusty May and played their home games at Eleanor R. Baldwin Arena in Boca Raton, Florida as members of Conference USA. The Owls finished the season 35–4, 18–2 in C-USA play to win the regular season championship. They defeated Western Kentucky, Middle Tennessee, and UAB to win the C-USA tournament championship. As a result, they received the conference's automatic bid to the NCAA tournament as the No. 9 seed in the East region. They defeated Memphis in the first round which marked the school's first NCAA tournament win. They then defeated Fairleigh Dickinson to advance to the Sweet Sixteen. The Owls defeated Tennessee and Kansas State to advance to the school's first Final Four. This made FAU the first men's team since George Mason in 2006 to reach the Final Four in the same season that it earned its first NCAA tournament win. In the Final Four, they lost to San Diego State, 72–71, on Lamont Butler's buzzer beater.

On January 16, 2023, the Owls were ranked in the AP poll for the first time in program history.

On October 21, 2021, Florida Atlantic accepted an invitation to join the American Athletic Conference and became a full-member on July 1, 2023. As a result, this season was the program's last as a member of Conference USA.

== Previous season ==
The Owls finished the 2021-22 season 19–15, 11–7 in C-USA play to finish in third place in the East Division. They defeated Southern Miss in the second round of the C-USA tournament before losing to UAB in the quarterfinals. The Owls received an invitation to the College Basketball Invitational, where they lost to Northern Colorado in the first round.

== Offseason ==
=== Departures ===
Name	Number	Pos.	Height	Weight	Year	Hometown	Reason for departure
Madiaw Niang	1	F	6'9"	230	Senior	Dakar, Senegal	Graduate transferred to Radford
Everett Winchester	2	G	6'6"	212	GS Senior	Baltimore, MD	Graduated
Bogdan Zimojic	5	G	6'5"	190	Freshman	Belgrade, Serbia	Transferred to Tennessee Tech
Kenan Blackshear	13	G	6'6"	215	Sophomore	Orlando, FL	Transferred to Nevada
Bitumba Baruti	20	F	6'7"	220	GS Senior	Lubumbashi, Democratic Republic of the Congo	Graduated
Brant Ulmer	32	F	6'7"	201	Junior	Live Oak, FL	Walk-on; left the team for personal reasons
Dardan Kapiti	35	F	6'10"	213	Junior	Pristina, Kosovo	Transferred to Eastern Kentucky

=== Incoming transfers ===
Name	Number	Pos.	Height	Weight	Year	Hometown	Previous School
Isaiah Gaines	5	F	6'7"	225	Sophomore	Pensacola, FL	Northwest Mississippi CC
Jalen Gaffney	12	G	6'3"	180	Junior	Columbus, NJ	UConn

=== Recruiting class ===
College recruiting
Name	Hometown	School	Height	Weight	Commit date
Brenen Lorient; SG	Fort Lauderdale, FL	Calvary Christian Academy	6 ft 8 in (2.03 m)	200 lb (91 kg)	Nov 3, 2021
Brenen Lorient; SG	Recruit ratings: Scout: Rivals: (NR)				
Overall recruit ranking:
Note: In many cases, Scout, Rivals, 247Sports, On3, and ESPN may conflict in their listings of height and weight.; In these cases, the average was taken. ESPN grades are on a 100-point scale.; Sources: "2022 Team Ranking". Rivals.

== Roster ==
2022–23 Florida Atlantic Owls men's basketball team
Players
Coaches

Pos.	#	Name	Height	Weight	Year	Previous school	Hometown
F	0	Brenen Lorient	6 ft 9 in (2.06 m)	200 lb (91 kg)	Fr	Forest HS	Ocala, Florida
G	1	Johnell Davis	6 ft 4 in (1.93 m)	203 lb (92 kg)	So	21st Century Charter	Gary, Indiana
G	2	Nick Boyd	6 ft 3 in (1.91 m)	175 lb (79 kg)	So	Don Bosco Prep	Garnerville, New York
F	3	Giancarlo Rosado	6 ft 8 in (2.03 m)	247 lb (112 kg)	So	Palm Beach Lakes HS	West Palm Beach, Florida
G	4	Bryan Greenlee	6 ft 0 in (1.83 m)	191 lb (87 kg)	Jr	The Rock School; Minnesota	Gainesville, Florida
F	5	Isaiah Gaines	6 ft 8 in (2.03 m)	225 lb (102 kg)	So	Pensacola HS; NW Mississippi CC	Pensacola, Florida
G	11	Michael Forrest	6 ft 1 in (1.85 m)	174 lb (79 kg)	Sr	Blanche Ely HS	Lauderhill, Florida
G	12	Jalen Gaffney	6 ft 3 in (1.91 m)	185 lb (84 kg)	Jr	Westtown School; UConn	Columbus, New Jersey
G	13	Jack Jackson (W)	6 ft 4 in (1.93 m)	185 lb (84 kg)	Fr	Choate Rosemary	White Plains, New York
G	15	Alijah Martin	6 ft 2 in (1.88 m)	210 lb (95 kg)	So	North Pike HS	Summit, Mississippi
G	21	Alejandro Ralat	6 ft 0 in (1.83 m)	160 lb (73 kg)	RS So	Saint Andrew's School	San Juan, Puerto Rico
G	23	Brandon Weatherspoon	6 ft 4 in (1.93 m)	186 lb (84 kg)	Jr	Canton HS; Holmes CC	Canton, Mississippi
F	25	Tre Carroll	6 ft 7 in (2.01 m)	227 lb (103 kg)	RS Fr	Charlotte HS	Punta Gorda, Florida
F	30	Leo Beath (W)	6 ft 8 in (2.03 m)	210 lb (95 kg)	Fr	Oak Park HS	Malibu, California
C	50	Vladislav Goldin	7 ft 1 in (2.16 m)	240 lb (109 kg)	So	Putnam Science Academy; Texas Tech	Nalchik, Russia

Head coach

- Dusty May (Indiana)

Assistant coach(es)

- Kyle Church (Charlotte)
- Todd Abernethy (Mississippi)
- Drew Williamson (Old Dominion)
- KT Harrell - director of basketball operations (Auburn)
- Brandon Gilbert - special assistant (Florida)

Legend

- (C) Team captain
- (S) Suspended
- (I) Ineligible
- (W) Walk-on
- Injured
- Current redshirt

Roster
Last update: September 3, 2021

== Schedule and results ==
Date time, TV	Rank^{#}	Opponent^{#}	Result	Record	Site (attendance) city, state
Regular season
November 7, 2022*; 7:00 pm, CUSA.tv		Lynn	W 81–46	1–0	Eleanor R. Baldwin Arena (1,314); Boca Raton, FL
November 11, 2022*; 7:00 pm, SECN+		at Ole Miss	L 67–80	1–1	SJB Pavilion (5,974); Oxford, MS
November 14, 2022*; 7:00 pm, SECN+		at Florida	W 76–74	2–1	O'Connell Center (7,180); Gainesville, FL
November 17, 2022*; 7:00 pm, CUSA.tv		Bryant; Paradise Invitational	W 85–74	3–1	Eleanor R. Baldwin Arena (1,452); Boca Raton, FL
November 19, 2022*; 6:00 pm, CUSA.tv		Detroit Mercy; Paradise Invitational	W 76–55	4–1	Eleanor R. Baldwin Arena (1,420); Boca Raton, FL
November 26, 2022*; 1:00 pm, ESPN+		at Albany	W 73–56	5–1	McDonough Sports Complex (1,093); Troy, NY
November 30, 2022*; 7:00 pm, CUSA.tv		South Alabama	W 84–59	6–1	Eleanor R. Baldwin Arena (1,303); Boca Raton, FL
December 4, 2022*; 2:30 pm, ESPN+		at Eastern Michigan	W 101–73	7–1	George Gervin GameAbove Center (4,192); Ypsilanti, MI
December 7, 2022*; 7:00 pm, ESPN+		Florida Gulf Coast	W 85–53	8–1	Eleanor R. Baldwin Arena (2,281); Boca Raton, FL
December 14, 2022*; 7:00 pm, CUSA.tv		St. Thomas (FL)	W 97–74	9–1	Eleanor R. Baldwin Arena (1,316); Boca Raton, FL
December 17, 2022; 2:00 pm, CUSA.tv		FIU	W 79–53	10–1 (1–0)	Eleanor R. Baldwin Arena (1,797); Boca Raton, FL
December 21, 2022*; 7:00 pm, CUSA.tv		Northern Kentucky	W 67–52	11–1 (1–0)	Eleanor R. Baldwin Arena (1,448); Boca Raton, FL
December 29, 2022; 8:00 pm, ESPN+		at North Texas	W 50–46	12–1 (2–0)	UNT Coliseum (3,808); Denton, TX
January 5, 2023; 7:00 pm, ESPN+		UAB	W 88–86	13–1 (3–0)	Eleanor R. Baldwin Arena (2,561); Boca Raton, FL
January 7, 2023; 2:00 pm, CUSA.tv		Charlotte	W 71–67	14–1 (4–0)	Eleanor R. Baldwin Arena (1,816); Boca Raton, FL
January 11, 2023; 7:30 pm, ESPN+		at FIU	W 77–73 ^{OT}	15–1 (5–0)	Ocean Bank Convocation Center (2,244); Miami, FL
January 14, 2023; 2:00 pm, ESPN+		North Texas	W 66–62	16–1 (6–0)	Eleanor R. Baldwin Arena (3,060); Boca Raton, FL
January 16, 2023; 6:00 pm, ESPNU	No. 24	at Western Kentucky	W 76–62	17–1 (7–0)	E. A. Diddle Arena (5,206); Bowling Green, KY
January 19, 2023; 8:00 pm, ESPN+	No. 24	at UTSA	W 83–64	18–1 (8–0)	Convocation Center (1,210); San Antonio, TX
January 21, 2023; 9:00 pm, ESPN+	No. 24	at UTEP	W 67–59	19–1 (9–0)	Don Haskins Center (5,421); El Paso, TX
January 26, 2023; 7:00 pm, CBSSN	No. 21	Middle Tennessee	W 85–67	20–1 (10–0)	Eleanor R. Baldwin Arena (3,082); Boca Raton, FL
January 28, 2023; 4:00 pm, Stadium	No. 21	Western Kentucky	W 70–63	21–1 (11–0)	Eleanor R. Baldwin Arena (3,012); Boca Raton, FL
February 2, 2023; 7:00 pm, CBSSN	No. 19	at UAB	L 77–86	21–2 (11–1)	Bartow Arena (5,028); Birmingham, AL
February 4, 2023; 4:00 pm, ESPN+	No. 19	at Charlotte	W 67–52	22–2 (12–1)	Dale F. Halton Arena (4,037); Charlotte, NC
February 9, 2023; 7:00 pm, ESPN+		Rice	W 90–81	23–2 (13–1)	Eleanor R. Baldwin Arena (3,027); Boca Raton, FL
February 11, 2023; 2:00 pm, ESPN+		Louisiana Tech	W 90–85 ^{OT}	24–2 (14–1)	Eleanor R. Baldwin Arena (2,982); Boca Raton, FL
February 16, 2023; 7:00 pm, CBSSN	No. 25	at Middle Tennessee	L 70–74	24–3 (14–2)	Murphy Center (3,402); Murfreesboro, TN
February 23, 2023; 7:00 pm, ESPN+		UTSA	W 106–66	25–3 (15–2)	Eleanor R. Baldwin Arena (3,049); Boca Raton, FL
February 25, 2023; 2:00 pm, ESPN+		UTEP	W 75–49	26–3 (16–2)	Eleanor R. Baldwin Arena (3,130); Boca Raton, FL
March 2, 2023; 8:00 pm, CUSA.tv		at Rice	W 103–74	27–3 (17–2)	Tudor Fieldhouse (2,040); Houston, TX
March 4, 2023; 3:00 pm, ESPN+		at Louisiana Tech	W 76–72	28–3 (18–2)	Thomas Assembly Center (2,326); Ruston, LA
Conference USA tournament
March 9, 2023; 6:30 pm, ESPN+	(1)	vs. (8) Western Kentucky; Quarterfinals	W 75–51	29–3	Ford Center at The Star (1,773); Frisco, TX
March 10, 2023; 12:30 pm, CBSSN	(1)	vs. (4) Middle Tennessee; Semifinals	W 68–65	30–3	Ford Center at The Star; Frisco, TX
March 11, 2023; 7:30 pm, CBSSN	(1)	vs. (3) UAB; Championship	W 78–56	31–3	Ford Center at The Star (1,681); Frisco, TX
NCAA tournament
March 17, 2023*; 9:20 pm, TNT	(9 E) No. 25	vs. (8 E) No. 24 Memphis; First Round	W 66–65	32–3	Nationwide Arena (19,564); Columbus, OH
March 19, 2023*; 7:45 p.m., truTV	(9 E) No. 25	vs. (16 E) Fairleigh Dickinson; Second Round	W 78–70	33–3	Nationwide Arena (19,566); Columbus, OH
March 23, 2023*; 9:00 p.m., TBS	(9 E) No. 25	vs. (4 E) No. 20 Tennessee; Sweet Sixteen	W 62–55	34–3	Madison Square Garden (19,624); New York, NY
March 25, 2023*; 6:09 p.m., TBS	(9 E) No. 25	vs. (3 E) No. 15 Kansas State; Elite Eight	W 79–76	35–3	Madison Square Garden (19,680); New York, NY
April 1, 2023*; 6:09 p.m., CBS	(9 E) No. 25	vs. (5 S) No. 18 San Diego State; Final Four	L 71–72	35–4	NRG Stadium (73,860); Houston, TX
*Non-conference game. ^{#}Rankings from AP Poll. (#) Tournament seedings in parentheses. E=East. S=South. All times are in Eastern.

== Rankings ==
Ranking movements Legend: ██ Increase in ranking ██ Decrease in ranking — = Not ranked RV = Received votes
	Week																			
Poll	Pre	1	2	3	4	5	6	7	8	9	10	11	12	13	14	15	16	17	18	Final
AP	—	—	—	—	—	—	—	—	—	RV	RV	24	21	19	RV	25	RV	RV	25	Not released
Coaches	—	—	—	—	—	—	—	—	RV	RV	RV	RV	24	20	RV	RV	RV	RV	25	5

*AP does not release post-NCAA Tournament rankings.
