= 2022–23 UTSA Roadrunners men's basketball team =

Men's basketball team

2022–23 UTSA Roadrunners men's basketball
- Conference: Conference USA
- Record: 10–22 (4–16 C-USA)
- Head coach: Steve Henson (7th season)
- Associate head coach: Mike Peck
- Assistant coaches: Scott Thompson; Adam Hood
- Home arena: Convocation Center

2022–23 Conference USA men's basketball standings
	Conf.				Overall
Team	W		L	PCT	W		L	PCT
No. 25 Florida Atlantic †	18	–	2	.900	35	–	4	.897
North Texas	16	–	4	.800	31	–	7	.816
UAB	14	–	6	.700	29	–	10	.744
Middle Tennessee	11	–	9	.550	19	–	14	.576
Charlotte	9	–	11	.450	22	–	14	.611
Rice	8	–	12	.400	19	–	16	.543
FIU	8	–	12	.400	14	–	18	.438
Western Kentucky	8	–	12	.400	17	–	16	.515
UTEP	7	–	13	.350	14	–	18	.438
Louisiana Tech	7	–	13	.350	15	–	18	.455
UTSA	4	–	16	.200	10	–	22	.313
† 2023 C-USA tournament winner Rankings from AP poll

The 2022–23 UTSA Roadrunners men's basketball team represented the University of Texas at San Antonio in the 2022–23 NCAA Division I men's basketball season. The Roadrunners, led by seventh-year head coach Steve Henson, played their home games at the Convocation Center in San Antonio, Texas as a member of Conference USA.

The season marks the team's last season as members of Conference USA before joining the American Athletic Conference on July 1, 2023.

== Previous season ==
The Roadrunners finished the 2021–22 season 10–22, 3–15 in C-USA play to finish in sixth place in the West Division. They lost in the first round of the C-USA Tournament to Southern Miss.

== Offseason ==
=== Departures ===
Name	Number	Pos.	Height	Weight	Year	Hometown	Reason for departure
Cedrick Alley Jr.	0	G	6'6"	230	RS Senior	Houston, TX	Graduated
Darius McNeill	1	G	6'3"	185	Senior	Houston, TX	Graduate transferred to Troy
Dhieu Deing	3	G	6'5"	175	Junior	High Point, NC	Signed to play professionally in South Africa with Cape Town Tigers
Phoenix Ford	12	F	6'8"	225	RS Senior	St. Petersburg, FL	Graduated
Artan Jabbar	13	G	6'0"	180	Junior	Fort Worth, TX	Walk-on; transferred
Jordan Ivy-Curry	21	G	6'2"	170	Sophomore	La Marque, TX	Transferred to Pacific
Adrian Rodriguez	25	F	6'7"	245	RS Senior	Tulsa, OK	Graduated

=== Incoming transfers ===
Name	Number	Pos.	Height	Weight	Year	Hometown	Previous School
John Buggs III	0	G	6'2"	185	RS Sophomore	Homer, LA	Hill College
Japhet Medor	1	G	6'0"	160	RS Junior	Lake Worth, TX	Hillsborough CC
Carlton Linguard Jr.	12	F	7'0"	220	Senior	San Antonio, TX	Kansas State

=== 2022 recruiting class ===
College recruiting information
Name	Hometown	School	Height	Weight	Commit date
DJ Richards; SG	Montverde, FL	Montverde Academy	6 ft 5 in (1.96 m)	180 lb (82 kg)	Apr 14, 2022
DJ Richards; SG	Recruit ratings: No ratings found				
Massal Diouf; PF	Canada	N/A	6 ft 9 in (2.06 m)	235 lb (107 kg)	Apr 14, 2022
Massal Diouf; PF	Recruit ratings: No ratings found				
Overall recruit ranking:
Note: In many cases, Scout, Rivals, 247Sports, On3, and ESPN may conflict in their listings of height and weight.; In these cases, the average was taken. ESPN grades are on a 100-point scale.; Sources: "2022 Team Ranking". Rivals.

== Roster ==
2022–23 UTSA Roadrunners men's basketball team
Players
Coaches

Pos.	#	Name	Height	Weight	Year	Previous school	Hometown
G	0	John Buggs	6 ft 3 in (1.91 m)	185 lb (84 kg)	RS So	Hill College	Homer, LA
G	1	Japhet Medor	6 ft 0 in (1.83 m)	168 lb (76 kg)	RS Jr	Hillsborough CC	Wellington, FL
G/F	2	Aleu Aleu	6 ft 9 in (2.06 m)	190 lb (86 kg)	Sr	Temple College	Austin, TX
G	3	Azavier Johnson	6 ft 5 in (1.96 m)	202 lb (92 kg)	RS Fr	Faith Lutheran HS	Las Vegas, NV
F	4	Josh Farmer	6 ft 10 in (2.08 m)	198 lb (90 kg)	So	Sharpstown HS	Houston, TX
F	5	DJ Richards	6 ft 5 in (1.96 m)	180 lb (82 kg)	Fr	Montverde Academy	Houston, TX
G	10	Erik Czumbel	6 ft 3 in (1.91 m)	196 lb (89 kg)	Sr	Liceo Leonardo da Vinci	Verona, Italy
F	11	Lachlan Bofinger	6 ft 6 in (1.98 m)	223 lb (101 kg)	Jr	Montverde Academy	Sydney, Australia
F	12	Sam Aldirawi (W)	6 ft 5 in (1.96 m)	202 lb (92 kg)	Fr	Cinco Ranch HS	Houston, TX
F	13	Carlton Linguard Jr.	7 ft 0 in (2.13 m)	218 lb (99 kg)	Sr	Temple College	San Antonio, TX
F	14	Massal Diouf	6 ft 9 in (2.06 m)	240 lb (109 kg)	Fr	Western Canada Prep Academy	Gouda, Netherlands
G	20	Lamin Sabally	6 ft 8 in (2.03 m)	204 lb (93 kg)	So	Bella Vista Prep	Berlin, Germany
G	22	Christian Tucker (W)	6 ft 3 in (1.91 m)	178 lb (81 kg)	So	Gilbert Perry HS	Chandler, AZ
C	24	Jacob Germany	6 ft 11 in (2.11 m)	238 lb (108 kg)	Sr	Kingston HS	Kingston, OK
G	25	Isaiah Addo-Ankrah	6 ft 7 in (2.01 m)	200 lb (91 kg)	Jr	Second Baptist School	Houston, TX

Head coach

- Steve Henson (Kansas State)

Assistant coach(es)

- Mike Peck (Northwood)
- Scott Thompson (Mississippi)
- Adam Hood (Air Force)

Legend

- (C) Team captain
- (S) Suspended
- (I) Ineligible
- (W) Walk-on
- Injured
- Current redshirt

Roster

== Schedule and results ==
Date time, TV	Rank^{#}	Opponent^{#}	Result	Record	Site (attendance) city, state
Exhibition
November 2, 2022*; 7:00 p.m.		Schreiner	W 93–60		Convocation Center (375); San Antonio, TX
Non-conference regular season
November 7, 2022*; 7:00 p.m., CUSA.tv		Trinity (TX)	W 74–47	1–0	Convocation Center (930); San Antonio, TX
November 11, 2022*; 7:00 p.m., ESPN+		at Texas A&M–Corpus Christi; South Texas Showdown	L 55–75	1–1	American Bank Center (1,400); Corpus Christi, TX
November 14, 2022*; 7:00 p.m., CUSA.tv		St. Mary's (TX)	W 66–59	2–1	Convocation Center (782); San Antonio, TX
November 17, 2022*; 7:00 p.m., CUSA.tv		Texas State; I-35 Rivalry	W 61–56	3–1	Convocation Center (1,587); San Antonio, TX
November 22, 2022*; 7:00 p.m., CUSA.tv		Prairie View A&M	W 82–75	4–1	Convocation Center (1,081); San Antonio, TX
November 25, 2022*; 7:30 p.m., CUSA.tv		Grambling State; 210 San Antonio Shootout	L 55–75	4–2	Convocation Center (848); San Antonio, TX
November 27, 2022*; 7:30 p.m., CUSA.tv		Dartmouth; 210 San Antonio Shootout	L 77–78 ^{OT}	4–3	Convocation Center (813); San Antonio, TX
November 28, 2022*; 6:30 p.m., CUSA.tv		Incarnate Word; 210 San Antonio Shootout	W 68–62	5–3	Convocation Center (797); San Antonio, TX
December 10, 2022*; 3:00 p.m., MW Network		at New Mexico	L 76–94	5–4	The Pit (10,049); Albuquerque, NM
December 13, 2022*; 8:00 p.m., P12N		at Utah	L 70–91	5–5	Jon M. Huntsman Center (5,223); Salt Lake City, UT
December 18, 2022*; 3:00 p.m., CUSA.tv		Bethune–Cookman	W 90–69	6–5	Convocation Center (774); San Antonio, TX
Conference USA regular season
December 22, 2022; 7:00 p.m., ESPN+		North Texas	L 54–78	6–6 (0–1)	Convocation Center (1,120); San Antonio, TX
December 29, 2022; 6:00 p.m., ESPN+		at Louisiana Tech	L 69–91	6–7 (0–2)	Thomas Assembly Center (2,704); Ruston, LA
December 31, 2022; 3:00 p.m., ESPN+		at UAB	L 67–90	6–8 (0–3)	Bartow Arena (3,326); Birmingham, AL
January 5, 2023; 7:00 p.m., ESPN+		Middle Tennessee	W 75–72	7–8 (1–3)	Convocation Center (708); San Antonio, TX
January 7, 2023; 3:00 p.m., Stadium		Western Kentucky	L 64–74	7–9 (1–4)	Convocation Center (922); San Antonio, TX
January 11, 2023; 8:00 p.m., ESPN+		at UTEP	L 57–69	7–10 (1–5)	Don Haskins Center (3,764); El Paso, TX
January 14, 2023; 1:00 p.m., ESPN+		at Charlotte	L 54–72	7–11 (1–6)	Dale F. Halton Arena (3,189); Charlotte, NC
January 16, 2023; 7:00 p.m., ESPN+		Rice	L 81–88 ^{OT}	7–12 (1–7)	Convocation Center (767); San Antonio, TX
January 19, 2023; 7:00 p.m., ESPN+		No. 24 Florida Atlantic	L 64–83	7–13 (1–8)	Convocation Center (1,210); San Antonio, TX
January 21, 2023; 3:00 p.m., ESPN+		FIU	L 72–77	7–14 (1–9)	Convocation Center (1,414); San Antonio, TX
January 26, 2023; 8:00 p.m., ESPNU		at North Texas	L 59–63	7–15 (1–10)	The Super Pit (3,948); Denton, TX
January 28, 2023; 3:00 p.m., ESPN+		Louisiana Tech	L 55–66	7–16 (1–11)	Convocation Center (1,568); San Antonio, TX
February 2, 2023; 7:00 p.m., ESPN+		at Western Kentucky	L 74–81	7–17 (1–12)	E. A. Diddle Arena (3,226); Bowling Green, KY
February 4, 2023; 5:00 p.m., ESPN+		at Middle Tennessee	L 60–84	7–18 (1–13)	Murphy Center (3,425); Murfreesboro, TN
February 11, 2023; 3:00 p.m., CUSA.tv		UTEP	L 66–77	7–19 (1–14)	Convocation Center (1,127); San Antonio, TX
February 16, 2023; 7:00 p.m., ESPN+		at Rice	W 84–79	8–19 (2–14)	Tudor Fieldhouse (1,999); Houston, TX
February 18, 2023; 3:00 p.m., Stadium		UAB	L 78–83	8–20 (2–15)	Convocation Center (1,220); San Antonio, TX
February 23, 2023; 6:00 p.m., ESPN+		at Florida Atlantic	L 66–106	8–21 (2–16)	Eleanor R. Baldwin Arena (3,049); Boca Raton, FL
February 25, 2023; 6:00 p.m., ESPN+		at FIU	W 95–91	9–21 (3–16)	Ocean Bank Convocation Center (1,119); Miami, FL
March 2, 2023; 7:00 p.m., ESPN+		Charlotte	W 78–73	10–21 (4–16)	Convocation Center (1,249); San Antonio, TX
Conference USA tournament
March 8, 2023; 8:30 p.m., ESPN+	(11)	vs. (6) Rice; First round	L 71–72	10–22	Ford Center at The Star; Frisco, TX
*Non-conference game. ^{#}Rankings from AP Poll. (#) Tournament seedings in parentheses. All times are in Central.

== See also ==
- 2022–23 UTSA Roadrunners women's basketball team
