= 2022–23 UAB Blazers men's basketball team =

American college basketball season

2022–23 UAB Blazers men's basketball

Sunshine Slam champions

NIT, Runner-Up
- Conference: Conference USA
- Record: 29–10 (14–6 CUSA)
- Head coach: Andy Kennedy (3rd season)
- Assistant coaches: Ryan Cross; Philip Pearson; Terry Parker
- Home arena: Bartow Arena

2022–23 Conference USA men's basketball standings
	Conf.				Overall
Team	W		L	PCT	W		L	PCT
No. 25 Florida Atlantic †	18	–	2	.900	35	–	4	.897
North Texas	16	–	4	.800	31	–	7	.816
UAB	14	–	6	.700	29	–	10	.744
Middle Tennessee	11	–	9	.550	19	–	14	.576
Charlotte	9	–	11	.450	22	–	14	.611
Rice	8	–	12	.400	19	–	16	.543
FIU	8	–	12	.400	14	–	18	.438
Western Kentucky	8	–	12	.400	17	–	16	.515
UTEP	7	–	13	.350	14	–	18	.438
Louisiana Tech	7	–	13	.350	15	–	18	.455
UTSA	4	–	16	.200	10	–	22	.313
† 2023 C-USA tournament winner Rankings from AP poll

The 2022–23 UAB Blazers men's basketball team represented the University of Alabama at Birmingham during the 2022–23 NCAA Division I men's basketball season. The team was led by third-year head coach Andy Kennedy, and played their home games at the Bartow Arena in Birmingham, Alabama as a member of Conference USA.

The season marked the team's last season as members of Conference USA before joining the American Athletic Conference on July 1, 2023.

== Previous season ==
The Blazers finished the 2021–22 season 27–8, 14–4 in C-USA play to finish second in the West Division. As the No. 2 seed out of the West Division, they defeated Florida Atlantic, Middle Tennessee, and Louisiana Tech to win the C-USA tournament. They received the conference's automatic bid to the NCAA tournament as the No. 12 seed in the South Region, where they lost in the first round to Houston.

== Offseason ==
=== Departures ===
Name	Number	Pos.	Height	Weight	Year	Hometown	Reason for departure
Tyreke Locure	0	G	6'0"	165	Junior	New Orleans, LA	Transferred to Louisiana–Monroe
Michael Ertel	2	G	6'2"	190	GS Senior	Indianapolis, IN	Graduated
Justin Brown	4	G	6'6"	208	GS Senior	Atlanta, GA	Graduated
Jamal Johnson	11	G	6'4"	195	RS Senior	Birmingham, AL	Transferred to Chattanooga
Quan Jackson	13	G	6'4"	190	GS Senior	Tallahassee, FL	Graduated
AD Diedhiou	22	F	6'10"	240	Junior	Dakar, Senegal	Transferred to Louisiana–Monroe
Josh LeBlanc Sr.	23	F	6'7"	230	Senior	Baton Rouge, LA	Transferred to Nicholls
Elijah Tate	24	G	6'3"	185	Sophomore	Baton Rouge, LA	Transferred to South Plains College

=== Incoming transfers ===
Name	Number	Pos.	Height	Weight	Year	Hometown	Previous School
Javian Davis	0	F	6'9"	240	RS Junior	Canton, MS	Mississippi State
Ledarrius Brewer	2	G	6'5"	190	RS Senior	Meridian, MS	East Tennessee State
Eric Gaines	4	G	6'2"	150	Sophomore	Lithonia, GA	LSU
Ty Brewer	15	F	6'9"	205	Senior	Meridian, MS	East Tennessee State
Tyler Bertram	23	G	6'3"	185	RS Junior	Cooperstown, NY	Binghamton

=== Recruiting classes ===
==== 2022 recruiting class ====
College recruiting information
Name	Hometown	School	Height	Weight	Commit date
Efrem Johnson; SG	Huntsville, AL	Grissom High School	6 ft 4 in (1.93 m)	175 lb (79 kg)	Apr 18, 2022
Efrem Johnson; SG	Recruit ratings: No ratings found				
Overall recruit ranking:
Note: In many cases, Scout, Rivals, 247Sports, On3, and ESPN may conflict in their listings of height and weight.; In these cases, the average was taken. ESPN grades are on a 100-point scale.; Sources: "2022 Team Ranking". Rivals.

==== 2023 recruiting class ====
College recruiting information (2023)
Name	Hometown	School	Height	Weight	Commit date
K.J. Satterfield; SG	Columbus, OH	Whitehall Yearling High School	6 ft 4 in (1.93 m)	180 lb (82 kg)	Mar 17, 2022
K.J. Satterfield; SG	Recruit ratings: 247Sports:				
Overall recruit ranking:
Note: In many cases, Scout, Rivals, 247Sports, On3, and ESPN may conflict in their listings of height and weight.; In these cases, the average was taken. ESPN grades are on a 100-point scale.; Sources: "2023 Team Ranking". Rivals.

== Roster ==
2022–23 UAB Blazers men's basketball team
Players
Coaches

Pos.	#	Name	Height	Weight	Year	Previous school	Hometown
F	0	Javian Davis	6 ft 9 in (2.06 m)	265 lb (120 kg)	RS Jr	Mississippi State	Canton, Mississippi
G	2	Ledarrius Brewer	6 ft 5 in (1.96 m)	190 lb (86 kg)	RS Sr	East Tennessee State	Meridian, Mississippi
G	3	Tavin Lovan	6 ft 4 in (1.93 m)	210 lb (95 kg)	Sr	Franklin-Simpson High School	Franklin, Kentucky
G	4	Eric Gaines	6 ft 2 in (1.88 m)	165 lb (75 kg)	So	LSU	Lithonia, GA
F	5	KJ Buffen	6 ft 7 in (2.01 m)	230 lb (104 kg)	Sr	Ole Miss	Gainesville, Georgia
G	10	Jordan Walker	5 ft 11 in (1.8 m)	170 lb (77 kg)	RS Sr	Tulane	Port Washington, New York
G	12	Tony Toney	6 ft 2 in (1.88 m)	195 lb (88 kg)	So	Mae Jeminson High School	Huntsville, Alabama
F	15	Ty Brewer	6 ft 7 in (2.01 m)	200 lb (91 kg)	Sr	East Tennessee State	Meridian, Mississippi
G	21	Jon Coleman (W)	5 ft 10 in (1.78 m)	165 lb (75 kg)	Jr	Hall High School	Little Rock, Arkansas
F	22	Seth Sigmon (W)	6 ft 3 in (1.91 m)	205 lb (93 kg)	Jr	Huntsville High School	Houston, Texas
G	23	Tyler Bertram	6 ft 3 in (1.91 m)	170 lb (77 kg)	RS Jr	Binghamton	Cooperstown, New York
G	24	Efrem Johnson	6 ft 4 in (1.93 m)	180 lb (82 kg)	Fr	Grissom High School	Huntsville, Alabama
F	25	Rongie Gordon	6 ft 8 in (2.03 m)	225 lb (102 kg)	So	Jefferson Davis High School	Montgomery, Alabama
G	30	Ryan Donohoo (W)	6 ft 0 in (1.83 m)	180 lb (82 kg)	So	Briarwood Christian School	Birmingham, Alabama
C	55	Trey Jemison	6 ft 11 in (2.11 m)	260 lb (118 kg)	Sr	Clemson	Birmingham, Alabama

Head coach

- Andy Kennedy (UAB)

Assistant coach(es)

- Ryan Cross (Buffalo)
- Philip Pearson (Alabama)
- Terry Parker (Louisiana Tech)

Legend

- (C) Team captain
- (S) Suspended
- (I) Ineligible
- (W) Walk-on
- Injured
- Current redshirt

Roster

== Schedule and results ==
Date time, TV	Rank^{#}	Opponent^{#}	Result	Record	High points	High rebounds	High assists	Site (attendance) city, state
Exhibition
November 1, 2022*; 6:30 p.m.		Mississippi College	W 98–47		14 – Tied	12 – Jemison	5 – Toney	Bartow Arena (2,097); Birmingham, AL
Non-conference regular season
November 7, 2022*; 6:30 p.m., CUSA.tv		Alabama State	W 111–70	1–0	38 – Walker	10 – Buffen	4 – Gaines	Bartow Arena (3,991); Birmingham, AL
November 11, 2022*; 4:00 p.m., Barstool TV		vs. Toledo; Barstool Sports Invitational	L 85–93	1–1	25 – Walker	10 – Buffen	6 – Gaines	Wells Fargo Center; Philadelphia, PA
November 16, 2022*; 6:30 p.m., CUSA.tv		Presbyterian; Sunshine Slam campus site game	W 92–61	2–1	16 – Gaines	9 – Jemison	10 – Gaines	Bartow Arena (3,396); Birmingham, AL
November 21, 2022*; 5:00 p.m., CBSSN		vs. South Florida; Sunshine Slam Semifinals	W 80–65	3–1	15 – Walker	8 – Davis	5 – Walker	Ocean Center; Daytona Beach, FL
November 22, 2022*; 3:00 p.m., CBSSN		vs. Georgia; Sunshine Slam Championship	W 87–73	4–1	30 – Walker	9 – Jemison	8 – Gaines	Ocean Center; Daytona Beach, FL
November 26, 2022*; 12:00 p.m., CUSA.tv		Rhodes	W 110–53	5–1	17 – Tied	6 – Brewer	5 – Toney	Bartow Arena (3,290); Birmingham, AL
November 30, 2022*; 6:30 p.m., CUSA.tv		Jacksonville	W 80–61	6–1	26 – Walker	13 – Jemison	6 – Gaines	Bartow Arena (3,303); Birmingham, AL
December 4, 2022*; 1:00 p.m., ESPNU		South Alabama	W 76–68	7–1	30 – Walker	10 – Buffen	8 – Walker	Bartow Arena (3,833); Birmingham, AL
December 10, 2022*; 5:00 p.m., ESPN+		at West Virginia	L 70–81	7–2	19 – Tied	9 – Davis	7 – Walker	WVU Coliseum (12,182); Morgantown, WV
December 14, 2022*; 6:00 p.m., CBSSN		South Carolina	W 84–70	8–2	25 – Buffen	8 – Buffen	7 – Walker	Bartow Arena (5,126); Birmingham, AL
December 18, 2022*; 3:30 p.m., CBSSN		Southern	W 92–66	9–2	25 – Walker	14 – Jemison	6 – Walker	Bartow Arena (3,631); Birmingham, AL
Conference USA regular season
December 22, 2022; 6:30 p.m., ESPN+		Charlotte	W 76–68	10–2 (1–0)	25 – Walker	12 – Jemison	5 – Gaines	Bartow Arena (3,323); Birmingham, AL
December 29, 2022; 6:30 p.m., ESPN+		UTEP	W 79–73 ^{2OT}	11–2 (2–0)	25 – Walker	10 – Jemison	4 – Walker	Bartow Arena (3,747); Birmingham, AL
December 31, 2022; 3:00 p.m., ESPN+		UTSA	W 90–67	12–2 (3–0)	31 – Walker	9 – Buffen	7 – Gaines	Bartow Arena (3,326); Birmingham, AL
January 5, 2023; 6:00 p.m., ESPN+		at Florida Atlantic	L 86–88	12–3 (3–1)	21 – Walker	7 – Tied	5 – Gaines	Eleanor R. Baldwin Arena (2,561); Boca Raton, FL
January 7, 2023; 6:00 p.m., ESPN+		at FIU	L 87–90 ^{OT}	12–4 (3–2)	19 – Gaines	12 – Jemison	7 – Gaines	Ocean Bank Convocation Center (1,152); Miami, FL
January 11, 2023; 8:00 p.m., CBSSN		Western Kentucky	L 78–80	12–5 (3–3)	28 – Walker	14 – Jemison	5 – Buffen	Bartow Arena (4,353); Birmingham, AL
January 14, 2023; 3:00 p.m., Stadium		at Louisiana Tech	W 81–74	13–5 (4–3)	22 – Gaines	9 – Jemison	6 – Gaines	Thomas Assembly Center (3,490); Ruston, LA
January 16, 2023; 8:00 p.m., CBSSN		at Middle Tennessee	L 73–74 ^{OT}	13–6 (4–4)	18 – Jemison	11 – Jemison	3 – Toney	Murphy Center (3,224); Murfreesboro, TN
January 21, 2023; 3:00 p.m., Stadium		North Texas	L 52–63	13–7 (4–5)	15 – Gaines	11 – Jemison	4 – Gaines	Bartow Arena (5,109); Birmingham, AL
January 26, 2023; 8:00 p.m., CBSSN		Louisiana Tech	W 65–59	14–7 (5–5)	19 – Gaines	13 – Buffen	6 – Gaines	Bartow Arena (4,015); Birmingham, AL
January 28, 2023; 3:00 p.m., ESPN+		at Rice	W 70–52	15–7 (6–5)	20 – Tied	12 – Jemison	5 – Gaines	Tudor Fieldhouse (2,454); Houston, TX
February 2, 2023; 6:00 p.m., CBSSN		No. 19 Florida Atlantic	W 86–77	16–7 (7–5)	21 – Gaines	9 – Buffin	6 – Walker	Bartow Arena (5,028); Birmingham, AL
February 4, 2023; 3:00 p.m., ESPN+		FIU	W 76–72	17–7 (8–5)	12 – Tied	11 – Jemison	8 – Gaines	Bartow Arena (5,318); Birmingham, AL
February 9, 2023; 7:00 p.m., ESPN+		at North Texas	L 79–82 ^{2OT}	17–8 (8–6)	20 – Walker	7 – Buffen	4 – Walker	The Super Pit (3,873); Denton, TX
February 11, 2023; 3:00 p.m., Stadium		Middle Tennessee	W 92–69	18–8 (9–6)	25 – Walker	12 – Brewer	10 – Gaines	Bartow Arena (4,957); Birmingham, AL
February 16, 2023; 8:00 p.m., ESPN+		at UTEP	W 79–66	19–8 (10–6)	22 – Walker	8 – Tied	6 – Gaines	Don Haskins Center (3,619); El Paso, TX
February 18, 2023; 3:00 p.m., Stadium		at UTSA	W 83–78	20–8 (11–6)	25 – Walker	9 – Jemison	4 – Tied	Convocation Center (1,220); San Antonio, TX
February 23, 2023; 6:30 p.m., ESPN+		Rice	W 85–57	21–8 (12–6)	32 – Walker	13 – Jemison	8 – Walker	Bartow Arena (4,891); Birmingham, AL
February 25, 2023; 7:00 p.m., CBSSN		at Western Kentucky	W 72–60	22–8 (13–6)	17 – Gaines	10 – Jemison	4 – Lovan	E. A. Diddle Arena (5,623); Bowling Green, KY
March 4, 2023; 12:00 p.m., Stadium		at Charlotte	W 93–91 ^{2OT}	23–8 (14–6)	41 – Walker	8 – Tied	6 – Walker	Dale F. Halton Arena (2,534); Charlotte, NC
Conference USA tournament
March 9, 2023; 8:30 p.m., ESPN+	(3)	vs. (6) Rice; Quarterfinals	W 87–60	24–8	27 – Walker	10 – Jemison	6 – Gaines	Ford Center at The Star (2,765); Frisco, TX
March 10, 2023; 2:00 p.m., CBSSN	(3)	vs. (2) North Texas; Semifinals	W 76–69	25–8	32 – Walker	7 – Buffen	6 – Walker	Ford Center at The Star (2,005); Frisco, TX
March 11, 2023; 7:30 p.m., CBSSN	(3)	vs. (1) Florida Atlantic; Championship	L 56–78	25–9	18 – Walker	8 – Jemison	2 – Gaines	Ford Center at The Star (1,681); Frisco, TX
NIT
March 14, 2023*; 6:30 pm, ESPN+	(4)	Southern Miss; First Round – Clemson Bracket	W 88–60	26–9	26 – Buffen	12 – Buffen	6 – Gaines	Bartow Arena (2,237); Birmingham, AL
March 19, 2023*; 2:00 pm, ESPN+	(4)	Morehead State; Second Round – Clemson Bracket	W 77–59	27–9	25 – Brewer	16 – Jemison	7 – Gaines	Bartow Arena (2,624); Birmingham, AL
March 22, 2023*; 6:00 pm, ESPN2	(4)	at (2) Vanderbilt; Quarterfinals – Clemson Bracket	W 67–59	28–9	21 – Walker	12 – Jemison	7 – Walker	Memorial Gymnasium (10,258); Nashville, TN
March 28, 2023*; 8:30 pm, ESPN2	(4)	vs. Utah Valley; Semifinals	W 88–86 ^{OT}	29–9	30 – Brewer	12 – Brewer	6 – Walker	Orleans Arena (2,931); Paradise, NV
March 30, 2023*; 8:30 pm, ESPN2	(4)	vs. (2) North Texas; Championship	L 61–68	29–10	21 – Walker	7 – Tied	6 – Walker	Orleans Arena; Paradise, NV
*Non-conference game. ^{#}Rankings from AP Poll. (#) Tournament seedings in parentheses. All times are in Central.
