= Jason Edwards (basketball) =

American basketball player (born 2003)

Personal information
- Born: February 4, 2003 (age 23)
- Listed height: 6 ft 1 in (1.85 m)
- Listed weight: 180 lb (82 kg)

Career information
- High school: Parkview (Lilburn, Georgia)
- College: Miles College (2021–2022); Dodge City CC (2022–2023); North Texas (2023–2024); Vanderbilt (2024–2025); Providence (2025–2026)
- Position: Point guard

Career highlights
- First-team All-AAC (2024); Third-team All-SEC (2025)

Jason Edwards (born February 4, 2003) is an American former college basketball player. Edwards played for Miles College, Dodge City Community College, the North Texas Mean Green, Vanderbilt Commodores, and Providence Friars.

== High school ==
Edwards attended Parkview High School in Lilburn, Georgia, where he played basketball. After his senior year, Edwards was named an honorable mention for the GHSA All-7A basketball team. He was also named to the second-team All-Gwinnett basketball team. Despite his performance in high school, Edwards received no NCAA Division I college basketball offers.

== College career ==
After high school, Edwards spent a year at Miles College, where he redshirted. He then transferred to Dodge City Community College the following year, where he averaged 21.9 points per game, en route to leading Dodge City to a conference championship and being named NJCAA First Team All-American.

Following one year at Dodge City, Edwards transferred to the University of North Texas to continue playing college basketball. On January 6, 2024, Edwards scored a career-high 37 points, helped by 8 three-pointers made, in a win against Tulane. This performance, along with scoring 17 points the previous week against Wichita State, led to Edwards being named AAC Player of the Week. On January 31, Edwards scored 31 points in an overtime loss against UAB. He followed that performance with another 31 points the following game in a loss against USF. On February 15, Edwards scored 30 points in a win against Memphis. Against FAU, Edwards registered 32 points in a loss. Following the season, Edwards was named to the first-team All-AAC men's basketball team.

Following his one year at North Texas, Edwards transferred to play college basketball at Vanderbilt University. On December 8, 2024, Edwards scored a season-high 30 points in a win against TCU. In a three-game span, Edwards scored 18, 21, and 18 points against Tennessee, Alabama, and Kentucky, respectively, with all three teams being ranked by the Associated Press within the top ten teams in the country. In a rematch against No. 5 Tennessee, Vanderbilt scored 24 points in a loss. Following the season, Edwards was named to the third-team All-SEC men's basketball team.

After a year at Vanderbilt, Edwards transferred to Providence College for his final season of college basketball. Before the season, Edwards was named to the preseason second-team All-Big East men’s basketball team. Edwards was also named on the watchlist for the Jerry West Award. On December 13, 2025, Edwards scored a season-high 32 points in a double overtime loss against Butler. During the season, Edwards missed seven consecutive games due to a foot injury, and returned to play for Providence on February 7, scoring 25 in a win against DePaul. Edwards' foot injury continued to linger throughout the season, causing him to sit out the Big East tournament.

== Career statistics ==
Legend
| GP | Games played | GS | Games started | MPG | Minutes per game |
| FG% | Field goal percentage | 3P% | 3-point field goal percentage | FT% | Free throw percentage |
| RPG | Rebounds per game | APG | Assists per game | SPG | Steals per game |
| BPG | Blocks per game | PPG | Points per game | **Bold** | Career high |

=== College ===
| Year | Team | GP | GS | MPG | FG% | 3P% | FT% | RPG | APG | SPG | BPG | PPG |
|---|---|---|---|---|---|---|---|---|---|---|---|---|
| 2023–24 | North Texas | **34** | 22 | **32.6** | .425 | .350 | .807 | 2.4 | 1.4 | .8 | **.1** | **19.1** |
| 2024–25 | Vanderbilt | 33 | **24** | 25.2 | **.435** | **.353** | **.831** | 2.0 | 1.3 | **.9** | .0 | 17.0 |
| 2025–26 | Providence | 23 | 13 | 26.6 | .432 | .343 | .790 | **2.8** | **3.0** | .8 | .0 | 16.5 |
| Career | | 90 | 59 | 28.3 | .430 | .349 | .813 | 2.8 | 1.8 | .9 | .1 | 17.7 |
