= 2023–24 North Texas Mean Green men's basketball team =

American college basketball season

2023–24 North Texas Mean Green men's basketball
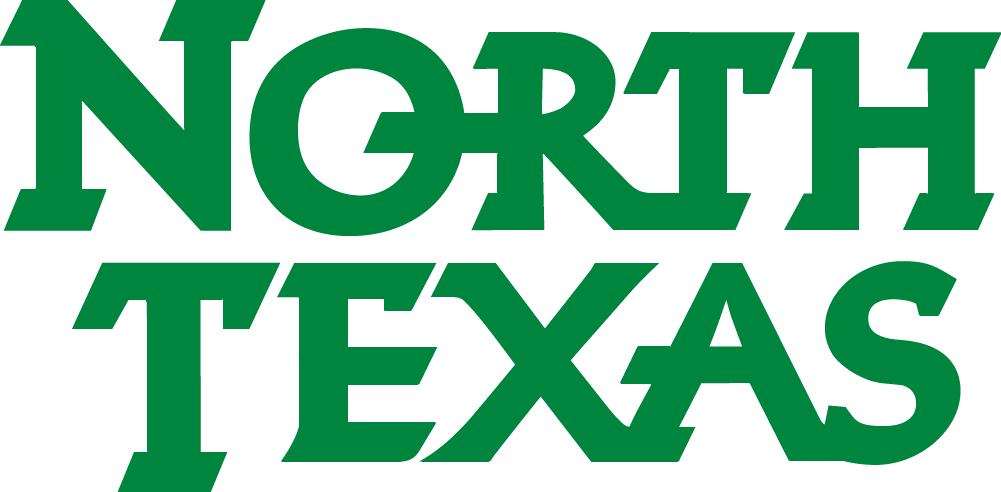

NIT, Second Round
- Conference: American Athletic Conference
- Record: 19–15 (10–8 AAC)
- Head coach: Ross Hodge (1st season)
- Assistant coaches: Johnny Estelle; Phil Forte; Jase Herl
- Home arena: The Super Pit

2023–24 American Athletic Conference men's basketball standings
	Conf.				Overall
Team	W		L	PCT	W		L	PCT
South Florida	16	–	2	.889	25	–	8	.758
Florida Atlantic	14	–	4	.778	25	–	9	.735
Charlotte	13	–	5	.722	19	–	12	.613
UAB †	12	–	6	.667	23	–	12	.657
Memphis	11	–	7	.611	22	–	10	.688
SMU	11	–	7	.611	20	–	13	.606
North Texas	10	–	8	.556	19	–	15	.559
East Carolina	7	–	11	.389	15	–	18	.455
Tulsa	7	–	11	.389	16	–	15	.516
Tulane	5	–	13	.278	14	–	17	.452
Temple	5	–	13	.278	16	–	20	.444
Wichita State	5	–	13	.278	15	–	19	.441
Rice	5	–	13	.278	11	–	21	.344
UTSA	5	–	13	.278	11	–	21	.344
† 2024 AAC tournament winner

The 2023–24 North Texas Mean Green men's basketball team represented the University of North Texas during the 2023–24 NCAA Division I men's basketball season. The team was led by first-year head coach Ross Hodge, and played their home games at UNT Coliseum in Denton, Texas as first year members of the American Athletic Conference.

== Previous season ==
The Mean Green finished the 2022–23 season 31–7, 16–4 in C-USA play to finish in second place. They defeated Louisiana Tech in the quarterfinals of the C-USA tournament before losing to UAB. They received an at-large bid to the National Invitation Tournament as a No. 2 seed. They defeated Alcorn State, Sam Houston, Oklahoma State, and Wisconsin to advance to the championship game. There they defeated C-USA foe UAB to win the NIT championship.

On March 31, 2023, head coach Grant McCasland left the school to take the head coaching position at Texas Tech. On April 2, the school named associate head coach Ross Hodge the team's new head coach.

The season marked the team's last season as members of Conference USA before joining the American Athletic Conference on July 1, 2023.

== Offseason ==
=== Departures ===
Name	Number	Pos.	Height	Weight	Year	Hometown	Reason for departure
Rasheed Browne	0	G	6'2"	182	RS Senior	Philadelphia, PA	Graduated
Bryce Zephir	2	G	6'2"	200	Junior	Carson, CA	Transferred to Salt Lake CC
Tyree Eady	4	G	6'5"	215	RS Senior	Middleton, Wi	Graduated
Tylor Perry	5	G	5'11"	182	Senior	Fort Coffee, OK	Graduate transferred to Kansas State
Kai Huntsberry	10	G	6'3"	215	Senior	New Orleans, LA	Left the team for personal reasons
Arsh Mattu	13	G	6'3"	192	RS Sophomore	Lewisville, TX	Walk-on; left the team for personal reasons
Jayden Martinez	25	F	6'7"	215	GS Senior	Cibolo, TX	Graduated
Abou Ousmane	33	F	6'10"	230	Junior	Brooklyn, NY	Transferred to Xavier

=== Incoming transfers ===
Name	Number	Pos.	Height	Weight	Year	Hometown	Previous School
John Buggs	0	G	6'3"	185	RS Junior	Homer, LA	UTSA
Jason Edwards	2	G	6'0"		RS Sophomore	Atlanta, GA	Dodge City CC
Rondel Walker	5	G	6'5"	185	Junior	Midwest City, OK	TCU
Robert Allen	10	F	6'8"	230	GS Senior	Orlando, FL	Ole Miss
Terrance Dixon	13	F	6'8"	200	Sophomore	Phoenix, AZ	Kilgore College
C. J. Noland	22	G	6'2"	229	Junior	Waxahachie, TX	Oklahoma

=== 2023 recruiting class ===
College recruiting information
Name	Hometown	School	Height	Weight	Commit date
Alex Cotton; SG	Carrollton, TX	Hebron High School	6 ft 5 in (1.96 m)	180 lb (82 kg)	Oct 19, 2022
Alex Cotton; SG	Recruit ratings: Scout: Rivals: 247Sports: (NR)				
Overall recruit ranking:
Note: In many cases, Scout, Rivals, 247Sports, On3, and ESPN may conflict in their listings of height and weight.; In these cases, the average was taken. ESPN grades are on a 100-point scale.; Sources: "2023 Team Ranking". Rivals.

=== 2024 recruiting class ===
College recruiting information (2024)
Name	Hometown	School	Height	Weight	Commit date
Layne Taylor; PG	Farmington, AR	Farmington High School	5 ft 9 in (1.75 m)	175 lb (79 kg)	Aug 27, 2023
Layne Taylor; PG	Recruit ratings: Rivals: 247Sports: (NR)				
Layne Taylor; SG	Plano, TX	Plano Sr. High School	6 ft 6 in (1.98 m)	185 lb (84 kg)	Sep 10, 2023
Layne Taylor; SG	Recruit ratings: Rivals: 247Sports: (NR)				
Overall recruit ranking:
Note: In many cases, Scout, Rivals, 247Sports, On3, and ESPN may conflict in their listings of height and weight.; In these cases, the average was taken. ESPN grades are on a 100-point scale.; Sources: "2024 Team Ranking". Rivals.

== Roster ==
2023–24 North Texas Mean Green men's basketball team
Players
Coaches

Pos.	#	Name	Height	Weight	Year	Previous school	Hometown
G	0	John Buggs III	6 ft 2 in (1.88 m)	185 lb (84 kg)	RS Jr	Putnam Science Academy (CT); UTSA	Homer, LA
G/F	1	Aaron Scott	6 ft 7 in (2.01 m)	200 lb (91 kg)	Jr	Legacy the School of Sport Sciences	Spring, TX
G	2	Jason Edwards	6 ft 1 in (1.85 m)	180 lb (82 kg)	RS So	Parkview HS; Dodge City CC	Atlanta, GA
G	3	Christian Moore	5 ft 11 in (1.8 m)	170 lb (77 kg)	So	Jacksonville HS	Jacksonville, AR
G	4	Alex Cotton	6 ft 5 in (1.96 m)	180 lb (82 kg)	Fr	Hebron HS	Carrollton, TX
G	5	Rondel Walker	6 ft 5 in (1.96 m)	185 lb (84 kg)	Jr	Putnam City West HS; TCU	Midwest City, OK
F	10	Robert Allen	6 ft 8 in (2.03 m)	230 lb (104 kg)	GS	Edgewater HS; Ole Miss	Orlando, FL
F	13	Terrance Dixon Jr.	6 ft 8 in (2.03 m)	200 lb (91 kg)	So	Bella Vista Prep; Kilgore College	Lawrenceville, GA
F	14	Moulaye Sissoko	6 ft 9 in (2.06 m)	240 lb (109 kg)	RS Jr	Lincoln Academy; Dayton	Bamako, Mali
G	15	Rubin Jones	6 ft 5 in (1.96 m)	190 lb (86 kg)	Sr	Yates HS	Houston, TX
G	20	Grayson Allo (W)	6 ft 3 in (1.91 m)	175 lb (79 kg)	RS So	Hebron HS	Carrollton, TX
F	21	Chris Morgan	6 ft 8 in (2.03 m)	243 lb (110 kg)	RS So	Lancaster HS	DeSoto, TX
G	22	C. J. Noland	6 ft 3 in (1.91 m)	215 lb (98 kg)	Jr	Waxahachie HS; Oklahoma	Waxahachie, TX
G	23	Matthew Stone	6 ft 4 in (1.93 m)	205 lb (93 kg)	Jr	Kingfisher HS	Kingsfisher, OK

Head coach

- Ross Hodge (East Texas A&M)

Assistant coach(es)

- Johnny Estelle (Texas A&M–Kingsville)
- Phil Forte (Oklahoma State)
- Jase Herl (Colorado Mesa)

Legend

- (C) Team captain
- (S) Suspended
- (I) Ineligible
- (W) Walk-on
- Injured
- Current redshirt

Roster

== Schedule and results ==
Date time, TV	Rank^{#}	Opponent^{#}	Result	Record	High points	High rebounds	High assists	Site (attendance) city, state
Exhibition
October 29, 2023*; 2:00 p.m.		Sam Houston; Charity Exhibition	W 63–53		16 – Edwards	9 – Allen	4 – Jones	The Super Pit (5,000); Denton, TX
Non-conference regular season
November 7, 2023*; 7:00 p.m., ESPN+		Northern Iowa	W 83–77 ^{OT}	1–0	26 – Scott	9 – Allen	5 – Jones	The Super Pit (4,415); Denton, TX
November 11, 2023*; 7:00 p.m., ESPN+		Omaha	W 75–64	2–0	18 – Tied	8 – Allen	8 – Jones	The Super Pit (3,533); Denton, TX
November 16, 2023*; 12:30 p.m., ESPNU		vs. St. John's; Charleston Classic quarterfinals	L 52–53	2–1	13 – Scott	9 – Allen	3 – Jones	TD Arena; Charleston, SC
November 17, 2023*; 10:30 a.m., ESPNU		vs. LSU; Charleston Classic consolation 2nd round	L 62–66	2–2	22 – Edwards	9 – Allen	3 – Jones	TD Arena; Charleston, SC
November 19, 2023*; 11:30 a.m., ESPN+		vs. Towson; Charleston Classic 7th Place Game	W 65–39	3–2	19 – Tied	9 – Allen	5 – Jones	TD Arena; Charleston, SC
November 26, 2023*; 1:00 p.m., ESPN+		Angelo State	W 79–50	4–2	14 – Scott	7 – Sissoko	5 – Jones	The Super Pit (2,865); Denton, TX
December 2, 2023*; 5:00 p.m., ESPN+		Mississippi Valley State	W 79–48	5–2	15 – Jones	11 – Allen	3 – Tied	The Super Pit (3,065); Denton, TX
December 5, 2023*; 8:00 p.m., MWN		at Boise State	L 64–69	5–3	20 – Edwards	9 – Allen	3 – Noland	ExtraMile Arena (9,865); Boise, ID
December 10, 2023*; 10:30 a.m.		vs. Fordham; NABC Brooklyn Showcase	L 59–60	5–4	10 – Charlton	6 – Tied	4 – Tied	Barclays Center; Brooklyn, NY
December 17, 2023*; 3:00 p.m.		vs. Mississippi State	L 54–72	5–5	20 – Jones	7 – Sissoko	3 – Edwards	Cadence Bank Arena (2,662); Tupelo, MS
December 23, 2023*; 1:00 p.m., ESPN+		UT Arlington	W 78–52	6–5	26 – Edwards	7 – Sissoko	5 – Noland	The Super Pit (3,357); Denton, TX
December 30, 2023*; 1:00 p.m., ESPN+		LSU–Shreveport	W 80–57	7–5	16 – Jones	10 – Allen	5 – Scott	The Super Pit (3,091); Denton, TX
AAC regular season
January 4, 2024; 8:00 p.m., ESPN2		at Wichita State	W 74–62	8–5 (1–0)	18 – Scott	11 – Sissoko	4 – Jones	Charles Koch Arena (5,531); Wichita, KS
January 6, 2024; 1:00 p.m., ESPNU		Tulane	W 70–56	9–5 (2–0)	37 – Edwards	16 – Allen	5 – Allen	The Super Pit (3,374); Denton, TX
January 13, 2024; 5:00 p.m., ESPNU		Temple	W 69–51	10–5 (3–0)	16 – Edwards	7 – Scott	3 – Tied	The Super Pit (3,310); Denton, TX
January 17, 2024; 6:00 p.m., ESPN+		at East Carolina	W 60–59	11–5 (4–0)	20 – Edwards	11 – Allen	3 – Edwards	Williams Arena (4,287); Greenville, NC
January 20, 2024; 3:00 p.m., ESPN+		at Charlotte	L 44–56	11–6 (4–1)	13 – Scott	10 – Allen	2 – Noland	Dale F. Halton Arena (4,514); Charlotte, NC
January 25, 2024; 6:00 p.m., ESPN2		SMU	W 68–66	12–6 (5–1)	22 – Edwards	10 – Allen	5 – Noland	The Super Pit (7,239); Denton, TX
January 28, 2024; 12:00 p.m., ESPN2		at No. 22 Florida Atlantic	L 63–66	12–7 (5–2)	16 – Edwards	9 – Walker	3 – Noland	Eleanor R. Baldwin Arena (3,161); Boca Raton, FL
January 31, 2024; 8:00 p.m., ESPNU		UAB	L 79–82 ^{OT}	12–8 (5–3)	31 – Edwards	11 – Walker	2 – Tied	The Super Pit (3,689); Denton, TX
February 3, 2024; 5:00 p.m., ESPN+		South Florida	L 55–60	12–9 (5–4)	31 – Edwards	10 – Walker	5 – Scott	The Super Pit (4,316); Denton, TX
February 7, 2024; 7:00 p.m., ESPN+		at Tulsa	W 68–55	13–9 (6–4)	18 – Scott	10 – Scott	2 – Scott	Reynolds Center (4,054); Tulsa, OK
February 11, 2024; 1:00 p.m., ESPNU		at SMU	L 68–71	13–10 (6–5)	18 – Edwards	7 – Scott	3 – Tied	Moody Coliseum (5,742); Dallas, TX
February 15, 2024; 7:00 p.m., ESPN+		Memphis	W 76–66	14–10 (7–5)	30 – Edwards	9 – Walker	5 – Walker	The Super Pit (5,689); Denton, TX
February 18, 2024; 2:00 p.m., ESPN+		at UAB	L 62–71	14–11 (7–6)	29 – Edwards	8 – Scott	4 – Edwards	Bartow Arena (4,785); Birmingham, AL
February 24, 2024; 3:00 p.m., ESPNU		UTSA	L 62–64	14–12 (7–7)	15 – Edwards	9 – Allen	2 – Tied	The Super Pit (5,247); Denton, TX
February 28, 2024; 6:00 p.m., ESPN+		at Tulane	W 80–76	15–12 (8–7)	19 – Scott	7 – Allen	6 – Tied	Devlin Fieldhouse (1,409); New Orleans, LA
March 3, 2024; 2:00 p.m., ESPN+		East Carolina	W 84–69	16–12 (9–7)	18 – Tied	7 – Allen	6 – Jones	The Super Pit (4,241); Denton, TX
March 6, 2024; 7:00 p.m., ESPN+		Florida Atlantic	L 76–80	16–13 (9–8)	32 – Edwards	6 – Allen	3 – Edwards	The Super Pit (4,551); Denton, TX
March 9, 2024; 7:00 p.m., ESPN+		at Rice	W 71–55	17–13 (10–8)	21 – Edwards	7 – Allen	5 – Noland	Tudor Fieldhouse (2,937); Houston, TX
AAC Tournament
March 14, 2024; 6:00 p.m., ESPNU	(7)	vs. (10) Tulane; Second Round	W 81–71	18–13	23 – Noland	8 – Jones	5 – Tied	Dickies Arena; Fort Worth, TX
March 15, 2024; 6:00 p.m., ESPNU	(7)	vs. (2) Florida Atlantic; Quarterfinals	L 71–77	18–14	26 – Edwards	8 – Allen	2 – Tied	Dickies Arena; Fort Worth, TX
NIT
March 19, 2024; 6:00 p.m., SECN		at (4) LSU; First Round - Seton Hall Bracket	W 84–77	19–14	21 – Noland	7 – Tied	4 – Jones	Pete Maravich Assembly Center (2,210); Baton Rouge, LA
March 23, 2024; 10:30 a.m., ESPN2		at (1) Seton Hall; Second Round - Seton Hall Bracket	L 58–72	19–15	23 – Edwards	7 – Noland	5 – Scott	Walsh Gymnasium (1,204); South Orange, NJ
*Non-conference game. ^{#}Rankings from AP Poll. (#) Tournament seedings in parentheses. All times are in Central.

== See also ==
- 2023–24 North Texas Mean Green women's basketball team
