= 2023–24 Memphis Tigers men's basketball team =

American college basketball season

2023–24 Memphis Tigers men's basketball
- Conference: American Athletic Conference
- Record: 19–10, 3 wins vacated (8–7, 3 wins vacated AAC)
- Head coach: Penny Hardaway (6th season)
- Assistant coaches: Rick Stansbury; Faragi Phillips; Andy Borman
- Home arena: FedExForum (Capacity: 18,119)

2023–24 American Athletic Conference men's basketball standings
| | Conf. | | | | Overall |
| Team | W | | L | PCT | W | | L | PCT |
|---|---|---|---|---|---|---|---|---|
| South Florida | 16 | – | 2 | .889 | 25 | – | 8 | .758 |
| Florida Atlantic | 14 | – | 4 | .778 | 25 | – | 9 | .735 |
| Charlotte | 13 | – | 5 | .722 | 19 | – | 12 | .613 |
| UAB † | 12 | – | 6 | .667 | 23 | – | 12 | .657 |
| Memphis | 11 | – | 7 | .611 | 22 | – | 10 | .688 |
| SMU | 11 | – | 7 | .611 | 20 | – | 13 | .606 |
| North Texas | 10 | – | 8 | .556 | 19 | – | 15 | .559 |
| East Carolina | 7 | – | 11 | .389 | 15 | – | 18 | .455 |
| Tulsa | 7 | – | 11 | .389 | 16 | – | 15 | .516 |
| Tulane | 5 | – | 13 | .278 | 14 | – | 17 | .452 |
| Temple | 5 | – | 13 | .278 | 16 | – | 20 | .444 |
| Wichita State | 5 | – | 13 | .278 | 15 | – | 19 | .441 |
| Rice | 5 | – | 13 | .278 | 11 | – | 21 | .344 |
| UTSA | 5 | – | 13 | .278 | 11 | – | 21 | .344 |
† 2024 AAC tournament winner

The 2023–24 Memphis Tigers men's basketball team represented the University of Memphis in the 2023–24 NCAA Division I men's basketball season. The Tigers were led by sixth-year head coach Penny Hardaway. The team played their home games at FedExForum as members of the American Athletic Conference. The Memphis Tigers men's basketball team drew an average home attendance of 12,276 in 15 games in 2023–24.

In July 2025, a probe revealed a basketball player paid two softball players to complete homework assignments and provide test answers for him, resulting in the school having to vacate their three wins earned on February 3, 8, and 11, retroactively ending Memphis’s streak of 20-win seasons.

== Previous season ==
The Tigers finished the 2022–23 season 23–8, 13–5 in AAC play, to finish in second place. They defeated UCF and Tulane to advance to the championship game of the AAC tournament. There, they upset No. 1-ranked Houston to claim their first-ever AAC tournament championship. As a result, they received the conference's automatic bid to the NCAA tournament as the No. 8 seed in the East Region, where they were defeated by Florida Atlantic in the first round.

== Offseason ==
=== Departing players ===
| Name | Number | Pos. | Height | Weight | Year | Hometown | Reason for departure |
|---|---|---|---|---|---|---|---|
| Elijah McCadden | 0 | G | 6'5" | 195 | Senior | Rocky Mount, NC | Graduated |
| Keonte Kennedy | 1 | G | 6'5" | 180 | RS Senior | Austin, TX | Graduate transferred to California |
| Alex Lomax | 2 | G | 6'0" | 190 | GS Senior | Memphis, TN | Graduated |
| Kendric Davis | 3 | G | 6'0" | 177 | GS Senior | Houston, TX | Graduated |
| Chandler Lawson | 4 | F | 6'7" | 215 | Senior | Memphis, TN | Graduate transferred to Arkansas |
| Kaodirichi Akobundu-Ehiogu | 5 | F | 6'10" | 210 | RS Junior | Lagos, Nigeria | Declared for 2023 NBA draft |
| Jahmar Young Jr. | 10 | F | 6'10" | 223 | RS Senior | Oak Cliff, TX | Graduate transferred to Texas Southern |
| Johnathan Lawson | 11 | G | 6'6" | 190 | Sophomore | Memphis, TN | Transferred to Creighton |
| DeAndre Williams | 12 | F | 6'9" | 205 | GS Senior | Houston, TX | Graduated |
| Ian Granja | 14 | F | 6'7" | 188 | Freshman | Barcelona, Spain | Transferred to Coastal Carolina |
| James DeJesus | 20 | G | 6'0" | 160 | Junior | Memphis, TN | Walk-on; left the team for personal reasons |
| Conor Glennon | 30 | G | 5'10" | 177 | Junior | Chicago, IL | Walk-on; transferred |
| Tadarius Jacobs | 31 | G | 6'1" | 170 | Sophomore | Memphis, TN | Walk-on; transferred |
| Damaria Franklin | 55 | G | 6'3" | 200 | RS Senior | Chicago, IL | Graduated |

=== Incoming transfers ===
| Name | Number | Pos. | Height | Weight | Year | Hometown | Previous school |
|---|---|---|---|---|---|---|---|
| Jonathan Pierre | 0 | F | 6'9" | 192 | Junior | Hallandale, FL | Nova Southeastern |
| Jayhlon Young | 1 | G | 6'2" | 175 | RS Junior | Dallas, TX | UCF |
| Nick Jourdain | 2 | F | 6'8" | 205 | Junior | Clifton, NJ | Temple |
| Jordan Brown | 3 | F | 6'11" | 225 | Senior | Roseville, CA | Louisiana |
| David Jones | 8 | F | 6'6" | 210 | Senior | Santo Domingo, DR | St. John's |
| Caleb Mills | 9 | G | 6'5" | 180 | RS Senior | Arden, NC | Florida State |
| Jaykwon Walton | 10 | G | 6'7" | 206 | RS Senior | Columbus, GA | Wichita State |
| Jahvon Quinerly | 11 | G | 6'1" | 175 | GS Senior | Hackensack, NJ | Alabama |
| Noah Stansbury | 15 | G | 6'0" | 170 | RS Junior | Bowling Green, KY | Walk-on; Western Kentucky |

=== 2023 recruiting class ===
College recruiting
| Name | Hometown | School | Height | Weight | Commit date |
|---|---|---|---|---|---|
| Mikey Williams #11 SG | San Ysidro, CA | San Ysidro High School | 6 ft 2 in (1.88 m) | 185 lb (84 kg) | Nov 5, 2022 |
| Mikey Williams #11 SG | Recruit ratings: Rivals: 247Sports: ESPN: (86) | | | | |
| Javonte Taylor #10 SF | Chicago, IL | San Ysidro High School | 6 ft 7 in (2.01 m) | 185 lb (84 kg) | Nov 5, 2022 |
| Javonte Taylor #10 SF | Recruit ratings: Rivals: 247Sports: ESPN: (84) | | | | |
| Ashton Hardaway #17 PF | Chatsworth, CA | Sierra Canyon High School | 6 ft 7 in (2.01 m) | 195 lb (88 kg) | Nov 16, 2022 |
| Ashton Hardaway #17 PF | Recruit ratings: Rivals: 247Sports: ESPN: (82) | | | | |
| Carl Cherenfant #45 PG | Fort Lauderdale, FL | Calvary Christian Academy | 6 ft 6 in (1.98 m) | 180 lb (82 kg) | Feb 21, 2022 |
| Carl Cherenfant #45 PG | Recruit ratings: Rivals: 247Sports: ESPN: (81) | | | | |
Overall recruit ranking: Rivals: 1 247Sports: 1
Note: In many cases, Scout, Rivals, 247Sports, On3, and ESPN may conflict in their listings of height and weight.; In these cases, the average was taken. ESPN grades are on a 100-point scale.; Sources: "Memphis 2023 Basketball Commitments". Rivals.; "2023 Memphis Tigers Recruiting Class". ESPN.; "2023 Team Ranking". Rivals.; "2023 Memphis Tigers Basketball 24/7 Sports Commits". 247Sports.

== Roster ==
2023–24 Memphis Tigers men's basketball team
Players
Coaches

| Pos. | # | Name | Height | Weight | Year | Previous school | Hometown |
|---|---|---|---|---|---|---|---|
| F | 0 | Jonathan Pierre | 6 ft 9 in (2.06 m) | 210 lb (95 kg) | Jr | Nova Southeastern | Hallandale Beach, FL |
| G | 1 | Jayhlon Young | 6 ft 2 in (1.88 m) | 175 lb (79 kg) | RS Jr | UCF | Dallas, TX |
| F | 2 | Nick Jourdain | 6 ft 9 in (2.06 m) | 220 lb (100 kg) | Jr | Temple | Clinton, NJ |
| F | 3 | Jordan Brown | 6 ft 11 in (2.11 m) | 225 lb (102 kg) | RS Sr | Louisiana | Roseville, CA |
| F | 4 | Ashton Hardaway | 6 ft 8 in (2.03 m) | 210 lb (95 kg) | Fr | Sierra Canyon School | Carson, CA |
| G | 5 | Carl Cherenfant | 6 ft 5 in (1.96 m) | 195 lb (88 kg) | Fr | Calvary Christian Academy | Pompano Beach, FL |
| F | 7 | Nae'Qwan Tomlin | 6 ft 10 in (2.08 m) | 210 lb (95 kg) | Sr | Kansas State | New York, NY |
| F | 8 | David Jones | 6 ft 6 in (1.98 m) | 210 lb (95 kg) | Sr | St. John's | Santo Domingo, DR |
| G | 9 | Caleb Mills | 6 ft 5 in (1.96 m) | 185 lb (84 kg) | RS Sr | Florida State | Arden, NC |
| G | 10 | Jaykwon Walton | 6 ft 7 in (2.01 m) | 206 lb (93 kg) | RS Sr | Wichita State | Columbus, GA |
| G | 11 | Jahvon Quinerly | 6 ft 1 in (1.85 m) | 175 lb (79 kg) | GS | Alabama | Hackensack, NJ |
| G | 15 | Noah Stansbury (W) | 6 ft 0 in (1.83 m) | 170 lb (77 kg) | RS Jr | Western Kentucky | Bowling Green, KY |
| C | 23 | Malcolm Dandridge | 6 ft 9 in (2.06 m) | 260 lb (118 kg) | RS Sr | East High School (Memphis, Tennessee) | Memphis, TN |
| G | 25 | Jayden Hardaway (W) | 6 ft 5 in (1.96 m) | 205 lb (93 kg) | GS | IMG Academy | Memphis, TN |
| F | 44 | JJ Taylor | 6 ft 8 in (2.03 m) | 180 lb (82 kg) | Fr | San Ysidro HS | Chicago, IL |
| G | | Mikey Williams | 6 ft 3 in (1.91 m) | 185 lb (84 kg) | Fr | San Ysidro HS | San Diego, CA |

Head coach

- Penny Hardaway (Memphis)

Assistant coach(es)

- Rick Stansbury (Campbellsville)
- Faragi Phillips (Mississippi Valley State)
- Andy Borman (Duke)

Legend

- (C) Team captain
- (S) Suspended
- (I) Ineligible
- (W) Walk-on
- Injured
- Current redshirt

Roster
Last update: March 26, 2024

== Schedule and results ==
| Date time, TV | Rank^{#} | Opponent^{#} | Result | Record | High points | High rebounds | High assists | Site (attendance) city, state |
Exhibition
| October 29, 2023*; 2:00 p.m. | | Lane | W 106–49 | | 17 – Jones | 8 – Jones | 5 – Jones | FedExForum (9,718); Memphis, TN |
| November 2, 2023*; 7:00 p.m. | | LeMoyne–Owen | W 104–63 | | 17 – Jones | 8 – Jones | 5 – Jones | FedExForum (9,582); Memphis, TN |
Non-conference regular season
| November 6, 2023*; 7:00 p.m., ESPN+ | | Jackson State | W 94–77 | 1–0 | 19 – Walton | 7 – Mills | 4 – Quinerly | FedExForum (10,912); Memphis, TN |
| November 10, 2023*; 8:00 p.m., SECN | | at Missouri | W 70–55 | 2–0 | 18 – Quinerly | 10 – Jones | 5 – Quinerly | Mizzou Arena (15,061); Columbia, MO |
| November 17, 2023*; 7:00 p.m., ESPN+ | | Alabama State | W 92–75 | 3–0 | 22 – Jones | 10 – Jones | 4 – Quinerly | FedExForum (11,289); Memphis, TN |
| November 22, 2023*; 4:00 p.m., ESPN2 | | vs. Michigan; Battle 4 Atlantis quarterfinals | W 71–67 | 4–0 | 17 – A. Hardaway | 5 – Brown | 8 – Quinerly | Imperial Arena (752); Nassau, Bahamas |
| November 23, 2023*; 4:00 p.m., ESPN | | vs. No. 20 Arkansas; Battle 4 Atlantis semifinals | W 84–79 | 5–0 | 36 – Jones | 4 – Jones | 4 – Quinerly | Imperial Arena (982); Nassau, Bahamas |
| November 24, 2023*; 2:00 p.m., ESPN | | vs. Villanova; Battle 4 Atlantis championship | L 63–79 | 5–1 | 13 – Jones | 7 – Jones | 2 – tied | Imperial Arena (1,201); Nassau, Bahamas |
| December 2, 2023*; 1:00 p.m., ESPN2 | | at Ole Miss | L 77–80 | 5–2 | 22 – Jones | 7 – tied | 6 – Quinerly | SJB Pavilion (9,416); Oxford, MS |
| December 6, 2023*; 6:00 p.m., ESPNU | | at VCU | W 85–80 ^{OT} | 6–2 | 23 – Jones | 8 – Jones | 6 – Quinerly | Siegel Center (7,637); Richmond, VA |
| December 10, 2023*; 3:30 p.m., ESPN2 | | at No. 21 Texas A&M | W 81–75 | 7–2 | 29 – Jones | 7 – tied | 5 – Quinerly | Reed Arena (9,565); College Station, TX |
| December 16, 2023*; 2:00 p.m., ESPN+ | | No. 13 Clemson | W 79–77 | 8–2 | 22 – Jones | 9 – Dandridge | 6 – Quinerly | FedExForum (15,052); Memphis, TN |
| December 19, 2023*; 6:00 p.m., ESPN2 | No. 23 | No. 22 Virginia | W 77–54 | 9–2 | 26 – Jones | 8 – Dandridge | 5 – Quinerly | FedExForum (13,553); Memphis, TN |
| December 23, 2023*; 3:00 p.m., CBS | No. 23 | Vanderbilt | W 77–75 | 10–2 | 28 – Jones | 9 – Jones | 4 – Quinerly | FedExForum (13,260); Memphis, TN |
| December 30, 2023*; 6:00 p.m., ESPN+ | No. 19 | Austin Peay | W 81–70 | 11–2 | 19 – Jones | 15 – Tomlin | 4 – Quinerly | FedExForum (12,018); Memphis, TN |
AAC regular season
| January 4, 2024; 7:00 p.m., ESPN+ | No. 15 | at Tulsa | W 78–75 | 12–2 (1–0) | 17 – tied | 8 – Jones | 3 – Jourdain | Reynolds Center (4,226); Tulsa, OK |
| January 7, 2024; 4:00 p.m., ESPN | No. 15 | SMU | W 62–59 | 13–2 (2–0) | 17 – Jones | 9 – Jones | 4 – tied | FedExForum (12,132); Memphis, TN |
| January 10, 2024; 7:00 p.m., ESPN+ | No. 13 | UTSA | W 107–101 ^{OT} | 14–2 (3–0) | 26 – Jones | 12 – Jourdain | 5 – Walton | FedExForum (11,389); Memphis, TN |
| January 14, 2024; 12:00 p.m., ESPN2 | No. 13 | at Wichita State | W 112–86 | 15–2 (4–0) | 23 – tied | 7 – Dandridge | 11 – Quinerly | Charles Koch Arena (5,538); Wichita, KS |
| January 18, 2024; 6:00 p.m., ESPN | No. 10 | South Florida | L 73–74 | 15–3 (4–1) | 25 – Jones | 7 – tied | 2 – tied | FedExForum (10,531); Memphis, TN |
| January 21, 2024; 2:00 p.m., ESPN2 | No. 10 | at Tulane | L 79–81 | 15–4 (4–2) | 32 – Jones | 11 – Jones | 6 – Quinerly | Devlin Fieldhouse (3,621); New Orleans, LA |
| January 28, 2024; 4:00 p.m., ESPN | No. 19 | at UAB; Battle for the Bones | L 88–97 | 15–5 (4–3) | 24 – Jones | 9 – Jones | 3 – tied | Bartow Arena (8,127); Birmingham, AL |
| January 31, 2024; 7:00 p.m., ESPN+ | | Rice | L 71–74 | 15–6 (4–4) | 18 – Jones | 8 – Tomlin | 6 – Quinerly | FedExForum (11,594); Memphis, TN |
| February 3, 2024; 12:00 p.m., CBS | | Wichita State | W 65–63 | 16–6 (5–4) | 26 – Jones | 7 – Dandridge | 8 – Quinerly | FedExForum (12,582); Memphis, TN |
| February 8, 2024; 6:00 p.m., ESPN2 | | at Temple | W 84–77 | 17–6 (6–4) | 23 – Jones | 10 – Jones | 6 – Quinerly | Liacouras Center (4,888); Philadelphia, PA |
| February 11, 2024; 1:00 p.m., ESPN2 | | Tulane | W 90–78 | 18–6 (7–4) | 23 – Jones | 10 – Jones | 6 – Quinerly | FedExForum (12,111); Memphis, TN |
| February 15, 2024; 7:00 p.m., ESPN+ | | at North Texas | L 66–76 | 18–7 (7–5) | 14 – Jones | 16 – Jones | 3 – tied | The Super Pit (5,689); Denton, TX |
| February 18, 2024; 3:00 p.m., ESPN | | at SMU | L 79–106 | 18–8 (7–6) | 33 – Jones | 10 – Jones | 5 – Quinerly | Moody Coliseum (6,781); Dallas, TX |
| February 21, 2024; 7:00 p.m., ESPN+ | | Charlotte | W 76–52 | 19–8 (8–6) | 17 – Quinerly | 9 – Dandridge | 6 – Quinerly | FedExForum (10,709); Memphis, TN |
| February 25, 2024; 1:00 p.m., ESPN | | Florida Atlantic | W 78–74 | 20–8 (9–6) | 25 – Jones | 11 – Jones | 6 – Quinerly | FedExForum (13,510); Memphis, TN |
| February 29, 2024; 6:00 p.m., ESPN2 | | at East Carolina | W 82–58 | 21–8 (10–6) | 20 – Tomlin | 10 – Jones | 7 – Quinerly | Williams Arena (4,934); Greenville, NC |
| March 3, 2024; 4:30 p.m., ESPN2 | | UAB; Battle for the Bones | W 106–87 | 22–8 (11–6) | 32 – Jones | 13 – Walton | 4 – Quinerly | FedExForum (13,491); Memphis, TN |
| March 9, 2024; 11:00 a.m., CBS | | at Florida Atlantic | L 84–92 | 22–9 (11–7) | 27 – Tomlin | 8 – Jones | 6 – Walton | Eleanor R. Baldwin Arena (3,161); Boca Raton, FL |
AAC tournament
| March 14, 2024; 1:30 p.m., ESPNU | (5) | vs. (12) Wichita State; Second Round | L 65–71 | 22–10 | 24 – Jones | 12 – Tomlin | 3 – tied | Dickies Arena (5,530); Fort Worth, TX |
*Non-conference game. ^{#}Rankings from AP poll. (#) Tournament seedings in parentheses. All times are in Central Time.

== Rankings ==
Ranking movements Legend: ██ Increase in ranking ██ Decrease in ranking — = Not ranked RV = Received votes
| | Week | | | | | | | | | | | | | | | | | | | | |
| Poll | Pre | 1 | 2 | 3 | 4 | 5 | 6 | 7 | 8 | 9 | 10 | 11 | 12 | 13 | 14 | 15 | 16 | 17 | 18 | 19 | Final |
|---|---|---|---|---|---|---|---|---|---|---|---|---|---|---|---|---|---|---|---|---|---|
| AP | RV | RV | RV | RV | RV | RV | 23 | 19 | 15 | 13 | 10 | 19 | RV | RV | RV | — | — | — | — | — | |
| Coaches | RV | RV | 23 | RV | RV | RV | 23 | 18 | 15 | 13 | 12 | 22 | RV | — | — | — | — | — | — | — | |
