= 2023–24 Florida Atlantic Owls men's basketball team =

American college basketball season

2023–24 Florida Atlantic Owls men's basketball

ESPN Events Invitational champions

NCAA tournament, first round
- Conference: American Athletic Conference
- Record: 25–9 (14–4 AAC)
- Head coach: Dusty May (6th season)
- Assistant coaches: Kyle Church; Todd Abernethy; Drew Williamson
- Home arena: Eleanor R. Baldwin Arena

2023–24 American Athletic Conference men's basketball standings
| | Conf. | | | | Overall |
| Team | W | | L | PCT | W | | L | PCT |
|---|---|---|---|---|---|---|---|---|
| South Florida | 16 | – | 2 | .889 | 25 | – | 8 | .758 |
| Florida Atlantic | 14 | – | 4 | .778 | 25 | – | 9 | .735 |
| Charlotte | 13 | – | 5 | .722 | 19 | – | 12 | .613 |
| UAB † | 12 | – | 6 | .667 | 23 | – | 12 | .657 |
| Memphis | 11 | – | 7 | .611 | 22 | – | 10 | .688 |
| SMU | 11 | – | 7 | .611 | 20 | – | 13 | .606 |
| North Texas | 10 | – | 8 | .556 | 19 | – | 15 | .559 |
| East Carolina | 7 | – | 11 | .389 | 15 | – | 18 | .455 |
| Tulsa | 7 | – | 11 | .389 | 16 | – | 15 | .516 |
| Tulane | 5 | – | 13 | .278 | 14 | – | 17 | .452 |
| Temple | 5 | – | 13 | .278 | 16 | – | 20 | .444 |
| Wichita State | 5 | – | 13 | .278 | 15 | – | 19 | .441 |
| Rice | 5 | – | 13 | .278 | 11 | – | 21 | .344 |
| UTSA | 5 | – | 13 | .278 | 11 | – | 21 | .344 |
† 2024 AAC tournament winner

The 2023–24 Florida Atlantic Owls men's basketball team represented Florida Atlantic University in the 2023–24 NCAA Division I men's basketball season. The Owls, led by sixth-year head coach Dusty May, played their home games at Eleanor R. Baldwin Arena in Boca Raton, Florida as a member of the American Athletic Conference (AAC), their first season in the American. They finished the season 25–9, 14–4 in AAC play, to finish in second place. They beat North Texas in the quarterfinals of the AAC tournament before losing to Temple in the semifinals. They received an at-large bid to the NCAA tournament as the No. 8 seed in the East region. There they lost to Northwestern, ending their season.

On March 24, 2024, head coach Dusty May left the school to take the head coaching position at Michigan. On March 27, the school named Baylor assistant John Jakus the team's new head coach.

The season marked the team's first year as members of the American Athletic Conference after announcing FAU would join the conference in June 2022.

== Previous season ==
The Owls finished the 2022–23 season 35–4, 18–2 in Conference USA (C-USA) play, to win the regular-season championship. They defeated Western Kentucky, Middle Tennessee and UAB to win the C-USA tournament championship. As a result, they received the conference's automatic bid to the NCAA tournament as the No. 9 seed in the East region. They defeated Memphis in the first round which marked the school's first NCAA tournament win. They then defeated Fairleigh Dickinson to advance to the Sweet Sixteen. The Owls defeated Tennessee and Kansas State to advance to the school's first Final Four. This made FAU the first men's team since George Mason in 2006 to reach the Final Four in the same season that it earned its first NCAA tournament win. In the Final Four, they lost to San Diego State.

== Offseason ==
=== Departures ===
| Name | Number | Pos. | Height | Weight | Year | Hometown | Reason for departure |
|---|---|---|---|---|---|---|---|
| Michael Forrest | 11 | G | 6' 1" | 174 | GS Senior | Lauderhill, FL | Graduated |

=== 2023 recruiting class ===
College recruiting information
| Name | Hometown | School | Height | Weight | Commit date |
|---|---|---|---|---|---|
| Devin Vanterpool; SG | Middle Village, NY | Christ the King High School | 6 ft 4 in (1.93 m) | 175 lb (79 kg) | Mar 12, 2023 |
| Devin Vanterpool; SG | Recruit ratings: Rivals: 247Sports: | | | | |
| Jakel Powell; SG | Raleigh, NC | Word of God Christian Academy | 6 ft 5 in (1.96 m) | 175 lb (79 kg) | Jun 8, 2023 |
| Jakel Powell; SG | Recruit ratings: Rivals: 247Sports: | | | | |
Overall recruit ranking:
Note: In many cases, Scout, Rivals, 247Sports, On3, and ESPN may conflict in their listings of height and weight.; In these cases, the average was taken. ESPN grades are on a 100-point scale.; Sources: "2023 Team Ranking". Rivals.

== Roster ==
2023–24 Florida Atlantic Owls men's basketball team
Players
Coaches

| Pos. | # | Name | Height | Weight | Year | Previous school | Hometown |
|---|---|---|---|---|---|---|---|
| F | 0 | Brenen Lorient | 6 ft 9 in (2.06 m) | 200 lb (91 kg) | So | Forest HS | Ocala, FL |
| G | 1 | Johnell Davis | 6 ft 4 in (1.93 m) | 203 lb (92 kg) | Jr | 21st Century | Gary, IN |
| G | 2 | Nick Boyd | 6 ft 3 in (1.91 m) | 175 lb (79 kg) | RS So | Don Bosco Prep | Garnerville, NY |
| F | 3 | Giancarlo Rosado | 6 ft 8 in (2.03 m) | 247 lb (112 kg) | Jr | Palm Beach Lakes | West Palm Beach, FL |
| G | 4 | Bryan Greenlee | 6 ft 0 in (1.83 m) | 191 lb (87 kg) | Sr | The Rock School; Minnesota | Gainesville, FL |
| F | 5 | Isaiah Gaines | 6 ft 8 in (2.03 m) | 225 lb (102 kg) | Jr | Pensacola; Northwest MS CC | Pensacola, FL |
| G | 11 | Jakel Powell | 6 ft 5 in (1.96 m) | 175 lb (79 kg) | Fr | Raleigh Christian | Raleigh, NC |
| G | 12 | Jalen Gaffney | 6 ft 3 in (1.91 m) | 185 lb (84 kg) | Sr | Westtown School; UConn | Columbus, NJ |
| G | 13 | Jack Johnson (W) | 6 ft 4 in (1.93 m) | 185 lb (84 kg) | RS Fr | Choate Rosemary | White Plains, NY |
| G | 15 | Alijah Martin | 6 ft 2 in (1.88 m) | 210 lb (95 kg) | Jr | North Pike | Summit, MS |
| G | 21 | Alejandro Ralat | 6 ft 0 in (1.83 m) | 160 lb (73 kg) | RS Jr | Saint Andrew's School | San Juan, Puerto Rico |
| G | 22 | Devin Vanterpool | 6 ft 4 in (1.93 m) | 175 lb (79 kg) | Fr | Christ the King | Laurel, MD |
| G | 23 | Brandon Weatherspoon | 6 ft 4 in (1.93 m) | 186 lb (84 kg) | Sr | Canton; Holmes CC | Canton, MS |
| F | 25 | Tre Carroll | 6 ft 7 in (2.01 m) | 227 lb (103 kg) | RS So | Charlotte HS | Punta Gorda, FL |
| F | 30 | Leo Beath (W) | 6 ft 8 in (2.03 m) | 210 lb (95 kg) | RS Fr | Oak Park | Malibu, CA |
| C | 50 | Vladislav Goldin | 7 ft 1 in (2.16 m) | 240 lb (109 kg) | Jr | Putnam Science Academy; Texas Tech | Nalchik, Russia |

Head coach

- Dusty May (Indiana)

Assistant coach(es)

- Kyle Church (Charlotte)
- Todd Abernethy (Mississippi)
- Drew Williamson (Old Dominion)

Legend

- (C) Team captain
- (S) Suspended
- (I) Ineligible
- (W) Walk-on
- Injured
- Current redshirt

Roster
Last update: December 5, 2023

== Schedule and results ==
| Date time, TV | Rank^{#} | Opponent^{#} | Result | Record | High points | High rebounds | High assists | Site (attendance) city, state |
Non-conference regular season
| November 8, 2023*; 7:00 p.m., Barstool.tv | No. 10 | vs. Loyola Chicago; Barstool Sports Invitational | W 75–62 | 1–0 | 19 – Goldin | 10 – Goldin | 5 – Greenlee | Wintrust Arena (2,169); Chicago, IL |
| November 14, 2023*; 7:00 p.m., ESPN+ | No. 10 | Eastern Michigan | W 100–57 | 2–0 | 19 – Goldin | 5 – tied | 7 – Boyd | Eleanor R. Baldwin Arena (3,161); Boca Raton, FL |
| November 18, 2023*; 6:00 p.m., ESPN+ | No. 10 | Bryant | L 52–61 | 2–1 | 17 – Davis | 12 – Davis | 2 – Greenlee | Eleanor R. Baldwin Arena (3,161); Boca Raton, FL |
| November 23, 2023*; 2:30 p.m., ESPN2 | No. 19 | vs. Butler; ESPN Events Invitational quarterfinals | W 91–86 | 3–1 | 19 – Goldin | 11 – Goldin | 3 – tied | State Farm Field House (3,061); Bay Lake, FL |
| November 24, 2023*; 11:00 a.m., ESPN2 | No. 19 | vs. No. 12 Texas A&M; ESPN Events Invitational semifinals | W 96–89 | 4–1 | 26 – Davis | 7 – Martin | 5 – tied | State Farm Field House; Bay Lake, FL |
| November 26, 2023*; 1:00 p.m., ESPN | No. 19 | vs. Virginia Tech; ESPN Events Invitational championship game | W 84–50 | 5–1 | 17 – Martin | 8 – Martin | 6 – Gaffney | State Farm Field House (2,528); Bay Lake, FL |
| November 30, 2023*; 6:00 p.m., ESPNU | No. 13 | Liberty; Field of 68 Tip-Off | W 83–58 | 6–1 | 20 – Martin | 9 – Rosado | 3 – Greenlee | Eleanor R. Baldwin Arena (3,161); Boca Raton, FL |
| December 2, 2023*; 6:00 p.m., ESPNU | No. 13 | Charleston; Field of 68 Tip-Off | W 90–74 | 7–1 | 24 – Davis | 12 – Goldin | 4 – Gaffney | Eleanor R. Baldwin Arena (3,161); Boca Raton, FL |
| December 5, 2023*; 6:30 p.m., ESPN | No. 11 | vs. No. 20 Illinois; Jimmy V Classic | L 89–98 | 7–2 | 23 – Goldin | 9 – Davis | 7 – Gaffney | Madison Square Garden (17,873); New York, NY |
| December 13, 2023*; 7:00 p.m., ESPN+ | No. 15 | FIU | W 94–60 | 8–2 | 16 – Davis | 9 – Goldin | 6 – Gaffney | Eleanor R. Baldwin Arena (3,161); Boca Raton, FL |
| December 16, 2023*; 4:00 p.m., ESPNU | No. 15 | vs. St. Bonaventure; Basketball Hall of Fame Classic | W 64–54 | 9–2 | 16 – Davis | 9 – Davis | 4 – Davis | MassMutual Center (2,745); Springfield, MA |
| December 23, 2023*; 3:00 p.m., FOX | No. 14 | vs. No. 4 Arizona; Desert Holiday Classic | W 96–95 ^{2OT} | 10–2 | 35 – Davis | 9 – Davis | 4 – Gaffney | T-Mobile Arena (7,207); Paradise, NV |
| December 30, 2023*; 7:00 p.m., ESPN+ | No. 7 | at Florida Gulf Coast | L 68–72 | 10–3 | 21 – Goldin | 10 – Martin | 2 – tied | Alico Arena (4,633); Fort Myers, FL |
AAC regular season
| January 2, 2024; 7:00 p.m., ESPN2 | No. 17 | East Carolina | W 79–64 | 11–3 (1–0) | 20 – tied | 11 – Goldin | 4 – tied | Eleanor R. Baldwin Arena (3,161); Boca Raton, FL |
| January 6, 2024; 4:00 p.m., ESPN+ | No. 17 | at Charlotte | L 68–70 | 11–4 (1–1) | 20 – Davis | 6 – Goldin | 2 – tied | Dale F. Halton Arena (3,785); Charlotte, NC |
| January 11, 2024; 7:00 p.m., ESPN2 | No. 24 | at Tulane | W 85–84 | 12–4 (2–1) | 21 – Boyd | 11 – Goldin | 8 – Davis | Devlin Fieldhouse (2,048); New Orleans, LA |
| January 14, 2024; 12:00 p.m., ESPN+ | No. 24 | UAB | W 86–73 | 13–4 (3–1) | 30 – Davis | 8 – tied | 5 – Greenlee | Eleanor R. Baldwin Arena (3,161); Boca Raton, FL |
| January 18, 2024; 7:00 p.m., ESPN2 | No. 23 | Wichita State | W 86–77 | 14–4 (4–1) | 22 – Martin | 9 – Martin | 6 – Davis | Eleanor R. Baldwin Arena (3,161); Boca Raton, FL |
| January 21, 2024; 3:00 p.m., ESPN+ | No. 23 | at UTSA | W 112–103 ^{OT} | 15–4 (5–1) | 34 – Davis | 7 – Davis | 6 – Boyd | Convocation Center (1,929); San Antonio, TX |
| January 24, 2024; 8:00 p.m., ESPN+ | No. 22 | at Rice | W 69–56 | 16–4 (6–1) | 18 – Boyd | 9 – Davis | 6 – Greenlee | Tudor Fieldhouse (1,896); Houston, TX |
| January 28, 2024; 1:00 p.m., ESPN2 | No. 22 | North Texas | W 66–63 | 17–4 (7–1) | 28 – Davis | 8 – tied | 3 – tied | Eleanor R. Baldwin Arena (3,161); Boca Raton, FL |
| February 3, 2024; 2:00 p.m., ESPN+ | No. 20 | Tulsa | W 102–70 | 18–4 (8–1) | 24 – Davis | 9 – Martin | 4 – Boyd | Eleanor R. Baldwin Arena (3,161); Boca Raton, FL |
| February 8, 2024; 9:00 p.m., ESPN2 | No. 20 | at UAB | L 73–76 ^{OT} | 18–5 (8–2) | 17 – Davis | 11 – Davis | 5 – Davis | Bartow Arena (5,309); Birmingham, AL |
| February 11, 2024; 12:00 p.m., ESPN2 | No. 20 | at Wichita State | W 95–82 ^{OT} | 19–5 (9–2) | 20 – Goldin | 9 – Goldin | 5 – Goldin | Charles Koch Arena (6,513); Wichita, KS |
| February 15, 2024; 7:00 p.m., ESPN2 | No. 24 | Temple | W 80–68 | 20–5 (10–2) | 17 – Davis | 7 – tied | 6 – Davis | Eleanor R. Baldwin Arena (3,161); Boca Raton, FL |
| February 18, 2024; 12:00 p.m., ESPN | No. 24 | at South Florida | L 86–90 | 20–6 (10–3) | 23 – Goldin | 6 – Davis | 5 – Davis | Yuengling Center (10,659); Tampa, FL |
| February 22, 2024; 7:00 p.m., ESPN2 | | SMU | W 80–70 | 21–6 (11–3) | 21 – Goldin | 8 – Gaffney | 5 – Davis | Eleanor R. Baldwin Arena (3,161); Boca Raton, FL |
| February 25, 2024; 2:00 p.m., ESPN | | at Memphis | L 74–78 | 21–7 (11–4) | 22 – Goldin | 9 – Martin | 6 – Weatherspoon | FedExForum (13,510); Memphis, TN |
| March 2, 2024; 12:00 p.m., ESPNU | | Tulane | W 79–73 | 22–7 (12–4) | 21 – Goldin | 12 – Goldin | 5 – Davis | Eleanor R. Baldwin Arena (3,161); Boca Raton, FL |
| March 6, 2024; 8:00 p.m., ESPN+ | | at North Texas | W 80–76 | 23–7 (13–4) | 29 – Davis | 8 – Martin | 4 – Davis | UNT Coliseum (4,551); Denton, TX |
| March 9, 2024; 12:00 p.m., CBS | | Memphis | W 92–84 | 24–7 (14–4) | 21 – tied | 12 – Goldin | 5 – Davis | Eleanor R. Baldwin Arena (3,161); Boca Raton, FL |
AAC tournament
| March 15, 2024; 7:00 p.m., ESPNU | (2) | vs. (7) North Texas; Quarterfinals | W 77–71 | 25–7 | 21 – Goldin | 10 – Goldin | 2 – tied | Dickies Arena; Fort Worth, TX |
| March 15, 2024; 5:00 p.m., ESPNU | (2) | vs. (11) Temple; Semifinals | L 73–74 | 25–8 | 23 – | 7 – tied | 2 – tied | Dickies Arena (5,545); Fort Worth, TX |
NCAA tournament
| March 22, 2024*; 12:15 p.m., CBS | (8 E) | vs. (9 E) Northwestern; First round | L 65–77 ^{OT} | 25–9 | 19 – Goldin | 9 – Goldin | 3 – Greenlee | Barclays Center; Brooklyn, NY |
*Non-conference game. ^{#}Rankings from AP poll. (#) Tournament seedings in parentheses. All times are in Eastern.

== Rankings ==
Ranking movements Legend: ██ Increase in ranking ██ Decrease in ranking — = Not ranked RV = Received votes
| | Week | | | | | | | | | | | | | | | | | | | | |
| Poll | Pre | 1 | 2 | 3 | 4 | 5 | 6 | 7 | 8 | 9 | 10 | 11 | 12 | 13 | 14 | 15 | 16 | 17 | 18 | 19 | Final |
|---|---|---|---|---|---|---|---|---|---|---|---|---|---|---|---|---|---|---|---|---|---|
| AP | 10 | 10 | 19 | 13 | 11 | 15 | 14 | 7 | 17 | 24 | 23 | 22 | 20 | 20 | 24 | RV | RV | RV | RV | RV | — |
| Coaches | 9 | 10 | 20 | 17 | 9 | 14 | 12 | 6 | 17 | 25 | RV | 24 | 23 | 22 | RV | RV | — | — | RV | — | — |
