= 2022–23 North Texas Mean Green men's basketball team =

American college basketball season

2022–23 North Texas Mean Green men's basketball
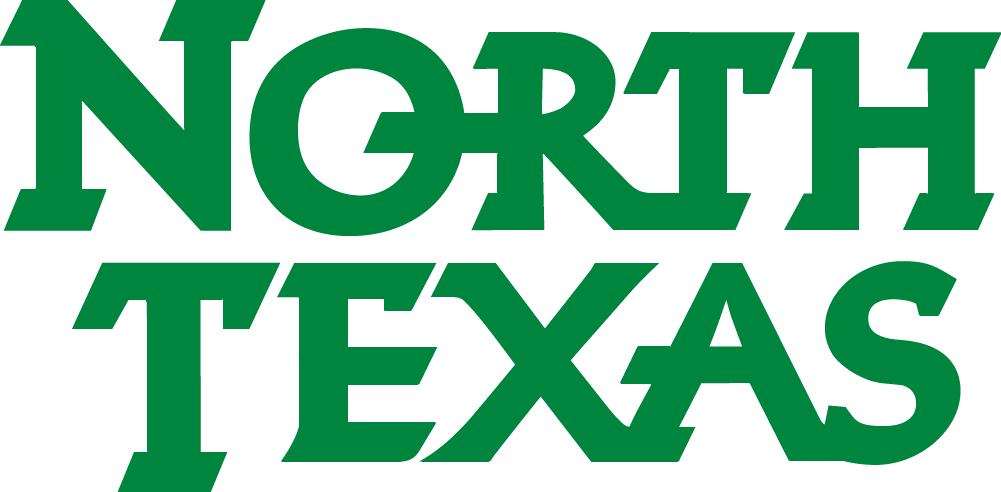

NIT champions
- Conference: Conference USA
- Record: 31–7 (16–4 C-USA)
- Head coach: Grant McCasland (6th season)
- Associate head coach: Ross Hodge
- Assistant coaches: Matt Braeuer; Achoki Moikobu
- Home arena: The Super Pit

2022–23 Conference USA men's basketball standings
	Conf.				Overall
Team	W		L	PCT	W		L	PCT
No. 25 Florida Atlantic †	18	–	2	.900	35	–	4	.897
North Texas	16	–	4	.800	31	–	7	.816
UAB	14	–	6	.700	29	–	10	.744
Middle Tennessee	11	–	9	.550	19	–	14	.576
Charlotte	9	–	11	.450	22	–	14	.611
Rice	8	–	12	.400	19	–	16	.543
FIU	8	–	12	.400	14	–	18	.438
Western Kentucky	8	–	12	.400	17	–	16	.515
UTEP	7	–	13	.350	14	–	18	.438
Louisiana Tech	7	–	13	.350	15	–	18	.455
UTSA	4	–	16	.200	10	–	22	.313
† 2023 C-USA tournament winner Rankings from AP poll

The 2022–23 North Texas Mean Green men's basketball team represented the University of North Texas during the 2022–23 NCAA Division I men's basketball season. The team was led by fifth-year head coach Grant McCasland, and played their home games at UNT Coliseum in Denton, Texas as a member of Conference USA (C-USA). They finished the season 31–7, going 16–4 in C-USA play to finish in second place. They defeated Louisiana Tech in the quarterfinals of the C-USA tournament before losing to UAB. They received an at-large bid to the National Invitation Tournament as a No. 2 seed. They defeated Alcorn State, Sam Houston, Oklahoma State and Wisconsin to advance to the championship game. There they defeated C-USA foe UAB to win the NIT championship.

On March 31, 2023, head coach Grant McCasland left the school to take the head coaching position at Texas Tech. On April 2, the school named associate head coach Ross Hodge the team's new head coach.

The season marked the team's last season as members of Conference USA before joining the American Athletic Conference on July 1, 2023.

== Previous season ==
The Mean Green finished the 2021–22 season 25–7, 16–2 in C-USA play, to finish as regular-season champions. They defeated Rice in the quarterfinals of the C-USA tournament before losing in the semifinals to Louisiana Tech. As a No. 1 seed who did not win their conference tournament, they received an automatic bid to the National Invitation Tournament where they defeated Texas State in the first round before losing in the second round to Virginia.

== Offseason ==
=== Departures ===
Name	Number	Pos.	Height	Weight	Year	Hometown	Reason for departure
Mardrez McBride	2	G	6' 2"	180	Senior	Augusta, GA	Graduated transferred to Georgia
Thomas Bell	4	F	6' 6"	205	RS Senior	East St. Louis, IL	Graduated
Jahmiah Simmons	10	F	6' 4"	220	RS Senior	St. Thomas, USVI	Graduated
JJ Murray	11	G	6' 1"	179	RS Senior	Rowlett, TX	Graduated
Dylan McKeon	14	G	6' 3"	180	Freshman	Garland, TX	Walk-on; left the team for personal reasons
Hameir Wright	44	F	6' 8"	208	RS Senior	Albany, NY	Graduated

=== Incoming transfers ===
Name	Number	Pos.	Height	Weight	Year	Hometown	Previous school
Tyree Eady	4	G	6' 5"	210	RS Senior	Middleton, WI	North Dakota State
Kai Huntsberry	10	G	6' 3"	216	Senior	New Orleans, LA	Mary
Moulaye Sissoko	14	C	6' 9"	240	RS Sophomore	Bamako, Mali	Dayton
Jayden Martinez	24	F	6' 7"	215	GS Senior	Cibolo, TX	New Hampshire

=== 2022 recruiting class ===
College recruiting information
Name	Hometown	School	Height	Weight	Commit date
Christian Moore; PG	Jacksonville, AR	Jacksonville High School	6 ft 0 in (1.83 m)	160 lb (73 kg)	Jul 11, 2022
Christian Moore; PG	Recruit ratings: No ratings found				
Overall recruit ranking:
Note: In many cases, Scout, Rivals, 247Sports, On3, and ESPN may conflict in their listings of height and weight.; In these cases, the average was taken. ESPN grades are on a 100-point scale.; Sources: "2022 Team Ranking". Rivals.

== Roster ==
2022–23 North Texas Mean Green men's basketball team
Players
Coaches

Pos.	#	Name	Height	Weight	Year	Previous school	Hometown
G	0	Rasheed Browne	6 ft 2 in (1.88 m)	182 lb (83 kg)	RS Sr	Neumann HS; Texas A&M–Corpus Christi	Philadelphia, PA
G/F	1	Aaron Scott	6 ft 7 in (2.01 m)	200 lb (91 kg)	So	Legacy the School of Sport Sciences	Spring, TX
G	2	Bryce Zephir	6 ft 2 in (1.88 m)	200 lb (91 kg)	Jr	Santa Monica HS; Chipola College	Carson, CA
G	3	Christian Moore	5 ft 11 in (1.8 m)	170 lb (77 kg)	Fr	Jacksonville HS	Jacksonville, AR
G	4	Tyree Eady	6 ft 5 in (1.96 m)	215 lb (98 kg)	RS Sr	Middleton HS; North Dakota State	Middleton, WI
G	5	Tylor Perry	5 ft 11 in (1.8 m)	182 lb (83 kg)	Sr	Spiro HS; Coffeyville CC	Fort Coffee, OK
G	10	Kai Huntsberry	6 ft 3 in (1.91 m)	215 lb (98 kg)	Sr	Placer HS; Mary	New Orleans, LA
G	13	Arsh Mattu (W)	6 ft 3 in (1.91 m)	192 lb (87 kg)	RS So	Lewisville HS	Lewisville, TX
F	14	Moulaye Sissoko	6 ft 9 in (2.06 m)	240 lb (109 kg)	RS So	Lincoln Academy; Dayton	Bamako, Mali
G	15	Rubin Jones	6 ft 5 in (1.96 m)	190 lb (86 kg)	Jr	Yates HS	Houston, TX
G	20	Grayson Allo (W)	6 ft 3 in (1.91 m)	175 lb (79 kg)	RS Fr	Hebron HS	Carrollton, TX
F	21	Chris Morgan	6 ft 8 in (2.03 m)	243 lb (110 kg)	RS Fr	Lancaster HS	DeSoto, TX
G	23	Matthew Stone	6 ft 4 in (1.93 m)	205 lb (93 kg)	So	Kingfisher HS	Kingfisher, OK
F	25	Jayden Martinez	6 ft 7 in (2.01 m)	215 lb (98 kg)	GS	Steele HS; New Hampshire	Cibolo, TX
F	33	Abou Ousmane	6 ft 10 in (2.08 m)	230 lb (104 kg)	Jr	Scotland Performance Institute	Brooklyn, NY

Head coach

- Grant McCasland (Baylor)

Assistant coach(es)

- Ross Hodge (East Texas A&M)
- Jareem Dowling (Maryland Eastern Shore)
- Achoki Moikobu (Fort Hays State)

Legend

- (C) Team captain
- (S) Suspended
- (I) Ineligible
- (W) Walk-on
- Injured
- Current redshirt

Roster
Last update: November 3, 2024

== Schedule and results ==
Date time, TV	Rank^{#}	Opponent^{#}	Result	Record	Site (attendance) city, state
Non-conference regular season
November 7, 2022*; 7:00 p.m., YouTube		Southern Nazarene	W 53–47	1–0	The Super Pit (3,573); Denton, TX
November 13, 2022*; 7:00 p.m., WCC Network		at Saint Mary's	L 33–63	1–1	University Credit Union Pavilion (2,878); Moraga, CA
November 19, 2022*; 5:00 p.m., ESPN+		Fresno State	W 61–52	2–1	The Super Pit (3,657); Denton, TX
November 22, 2022*; 7:00 p.m., YouTube		Paul Quinn	W 76–46	3–1	The Super Pit (2,514); Denton, TX
November 25, 2022*; 4:30 p.m., FloSports		vs. San Jose State; Nassau Championship quarterfinals	W 69–54	4–1	Baha Mar Convention Center (248); Nassau, Bahamas
November 26, 2022*; 7:00 p.m., FloSports		vs. Long Beach State; Nassau Championship semifinals	W 68–47	5–1	Baha Mar Convention Center (334); Nassau, Bahamas
November 27, 2022*; 7:00 p.m., FloSports		vs. UNC Wilmington; Nassau Championship final	L 51–55	5–2	Baha Mar Convention Center (414); Nassau, Bahamas
December 3, 2022*; 5:00 p.m., ESPN+		Omaha	W 75–45	6–2	The Super Pit (3,035); Denton, TX
December 6, 2022*; 7:00 p.m., ESPN+		at UT Arlington	W 60–57	7–2	College Park Center (1,931); Arlington, TX
December 10, 2022*; 4:30 p.m., ESPN+		vs. Grand Canyon; Jerry Colangelo Classic	W 60–58	8–2	Footprint Center (4,781); Phoenix, AZ
December 17, 2022*; 2:00 p.m., ESPN+		vs. UMass; Basketball Hall of Fame Classic	W 62–44	9–2	MassMutual Center (3,426); Springfield, MA
Conference USA regular season
December 22, 2022; 7:00 p.m., ESPN+		at UTSA	W 78–54	10–2 (1–0)	Convocation Center (1,120); San Antonio, TX
December 29, 2022; 7:00 p.m., ESPN+		Florida Atlantic	L 46–50	10–3 (1–1)	The Super Pit (3,808); Denton, TX
December 31, 2022; 3:00 p.m., ESPN+		FIU	W 72–57	11–3 (2–1)	The Super Pit (2,934); Denton, TX
January 5, 2023; 8:00 p.m., CBSSN		at Western Kentucky	W 70–66	12–3 (3–1)	E. A. Diddle Arena (3,024); Bowling Green, KY
January 7, 2023; 5:00 p.m., ESPN+		at Middle Tennessee	W 56–51	13–3 (4–1)	Murphy Center (3,148); Murfreesboro, TN
January 11, 2023; 7:00 p.m., ESPN+		Louisiana Tech	W 67–65	14–3 (5–1)	The Super Pit (3,633); Denton, TX
January 14, 2023; 1:00 p.m., ESPN+		at Florida Atlantic	L 62–66	14–4 (5–2)	Eleanor R. Baldwin Arena (3,060); Boca Raton, FL
January 16, 2023; 6:00 p.m., ESPN+		at FIU	W 64–57	15–4 (6–2)	Ocean Bank Convocation Center (1,183); Miami, FL
January 19, 2023; 7:00 p.m., ESPN+		Rice	L 60–72	15–5 (6–3)	The Super Pit (4,015); Denton, TX
January 21, 2023; 3:00 p.m., Stadium		at UAB	W 63–52	16–5 (7–3)	Bartow Arena (5,109); Birmingham, AL
January 26, 2023; 8:00 p.m., ESPNU		UTSA	W 63–59	17–5 (8–3)	The Super Pit (3,948); Denton, TX
January 28, 2023; 5:00 p.m., ESPN+		UTEP	W 52–42	18–5 (9–3)	The Super Pit (4,301); Denton, TX
February 4, 2023; 7:00 p.m., ESPN+		at Rice	W 74–64	19–5 (10–3)	Tudor Fieldhouse (2,246); Houston, TX
February 9, 2023; 7:00 p.m., ESPN+		UAB	W 82–79 ^{2OT}	20–5 (11–3)	The Super Pit (3,873); Denton, TX
February 11, 2023; 5:00 p.m., ESPN+		Charlotte	W 67–43	21–5 (12–3)	The Super Pit (4,123); Denton, TX
February 16, 2023; 6:00 p.m., ESPN+		at Louisiana Tech	W 72–62	22–5 (13–3)	Thomas Assembly Center (2,640); Ruston, LA
February 18, 2023; 8:00 p.m., ESPN+		at UTEP	W 80–72 ^{OT}	23–5 (14–3)	Don Haskins Center (4,838); El Paso, TX
February 23, 2023; 6:00 p.m., ESPN+		at Charlotte	L 49–55	23–6 (14–4)	Dale F. Halton Arena (3,015); Charlotte, NC
March 2, 2023; 7:00 p.m., CBSSN		Middle Tennessee	W 64–50	24–6 (15–4)	The Super Pit (4,076); Denton, TX
March 4, 2023; 2:00 p.m., Stadium		Western Kentucky	W 67–33	25–6 (16–4)	The Super Pit (5,002); Denton, TX
Conference USA tournament
March 9, 2023; 8:00 p.m., ESPN+	(2)	vs. (10) Louisiana Tech; Quarterfinals	W 74–46	26–6	Ford Center at The Star (2,765); Frisco, TX
March 10, 2023; 2:00 p.m., CBSSN	(2)	vs. (3) UAB; Semifinals	L 69–76	26–7	Ford Center at The Star (2,005); Frisco, TX
NIT
March 15, 2023; 7:00 p.m., ESPN+	(2)	Alcorn State; First round – Oklahoma State Bracket	W 69–53	27–7	The Super Pit (4,308); Denton, TX
March 19, 2023; 3:00 p.m., ESPN+	(2)	(3) Sam Houston; Second round – Oklahoma State Bracket	W 75–55	28–7	The Super Pit (3,130); Denton, TX
March 21, 2023; 6:00 p.m., ESPN	(2)	at (1) Oklahoma State; Quarterfinals – Oklahoma State Bracket	W 65–59 ^{OT}	29–7	Gallagher-Iba Arena (4,807); Stillwater, OK
March 28, 2023; 6:00 p.m., ESPN	(2)	vs. (2) Wisconsin; Semifinals	W 56–54	30–7	Orleans Arena; Paradise, NV
March 30, 2023; 8:30 p.m., ESPN2	(2)	vs. (4) UAB; Championship	W 68–61	31–7	Orleans Arena; Paradise, NV
*Non-conference game. ^{#}Rankings from AP poll. (#) Tournament seedings in parentheses. All times are in Central.

== See also ==
- 2022–23 North Texas Mean Green women's basketball team
