= Jase Herl =

American basketball coach

Current position
- Title: Assistant coach
- Team: West Virginia
- Conference: Big 12

Biographical details
- Born: Goodland, Kansas, U.S.

Playing career
- 2007–2008: Dodge City CC
- 2009–2010: Colorado Mesa

Coaching career (HC unless noted)
- 2010–2013: Colorado Mesa (assistant)
- 2013–2015: Northwest Kansas Tech
- 2015–2016: South Plains (assistant)
- 2016–2018: Colorado State (assistant)
- 2018: Colorado State (interim HC)
- 2018–2022: Missouri State (assistant)
- 2022–2023: Missouri State (associate HC)
- 2023–2025: North Texas (assistant)
- 2025–present: West Virginia (assistant)

Head coaching record
- Overall: 1–5 (.167)

Jase Herl is an American basketball coach and former player who is currently an assistant coach for the West Virginia Mountaineers men's basketball team. Herl was the second interim head coach of the Colorado State Rams men's basketball team in 2018.

== College career ==
After playing basketball at Goodland High School, where he was Goodland's all-time leading scorer, Herl first attended Dodge City Community College to play basketball there. After two years at Dodge City, Herl transferred to play basketball at Colorado Mesa University. In his senior year there, Herl was named to the All-Rocky Mountain Athletic Conference first team.

== Coaching career ==
Herl first began coaching at Colorado Mesa, being an assistant coach there from 2010 to 2013. Following his time at Colorado Mesa, Herl became the first head coach of the Northwest Kansas Technical College basketball program, taking over in its inaugural season. In two seasons at Northwest Kansas Tech, Herl achieved 56 wins. Herl then became an assistant coach at South Plains College, serving there for one year. In 2016, Herl was hired as an assistant coach for Colorado State basketball. Near the end of the 2017–18 season, previous interim head coach Steve Barnes was dismissed, and Herl was appointed interim head coach for the remaining six games. Herl went 1–5 in those last games to finish the season for Colorado State. After his stint at Colorado State, Herl joined Missouri State as an assistant basketball coach. Herl served there for five years before joining North Texas as an assistant coach in 2023. In 2025, Herl followed North Texas head coach Ross Hodge to West Virginia, where he was named an assistant coach.

== Head coaching record ==
Record table
Season	Team	Overall	Conference	Standing	Postseason
Colorado State (Mountain West) (2018)
2017–18	Colorado State	1–5	1–4	10th	
Colorado State:		1–5 (.167)	1–4 (.200)		
Total:		1–5 (.167)			
National champion Postseason invitational champion Conference regular season champion Conference regular season and conference tournament champion Division regular season champion Division regular season and conference tournament champion Conference tournament champion
