= 2023–24 Rice Owls men's basketball team =

American college basketball season

2023–24 Rice Owls men's basketball
- Conference: American Athletic Conference
- Record: 11–21 (5–13 AAC)
- Head coach: Scott Pera (7th season)
- Assistant coaches: Van Green; Greg Howell; Russ Pennell
- Home arena: Tudor Fieldhouse

2023–24 American Athletic Conference men's basketball standings
	Conf.				Overall
Team	W		L	PCT	W		L	PCT
South Florida	16	–	2	.889	25	–	8	.758
Florida Atlantic	14	–	4	.778	25	–	9	.735
Charlotte	13	–	5	.722	19	–	12	.613
UAB †	12	–	6	.667	23	–	12	.657
Memphis	11	–	7	.611	22	–	10	.688
SMU	11	–	7	.611	20	–	13	.606
North Texas	10	–	8	.556	19	–	15	.559
East Carolina	7	–	11	.389	15	–	18	.455
Tulsa	7	–	11	.389	16	–	15	.516
Tulane	5	–	13	.278	14	–	17	.452
Temple	5	–	13	.278	16	–	20	.444
Wichita State	5	–	13	.278	15	–	19	.441
Rice	5	–	13	.278	11	–	21	.344
UTSA	5	–	13	.278	11	–	21	.344
† 2024 AAC tournament winner

The 2023–24 Rice Owls men's basketball team represented Rice University during the 2023–24 NCAA Division I men's basketball season. The team, led by seventh-year head coach Scott Pera, played their home games at Tudor Fieldhouse in Houston, Texas as first-year members of the American Athletic Conference. The team finished the season 11–21, 5–12 in AAC play to finish in a five-way tie for 10th place. As the No. 12 seed in the AAC tournament, they lost in the first round to Wichita State.

On March 14, 2024, the school fired head coach Scot Pera. On March 24, the school hired Rob Lanier, who had been fired as head coach of SMU, as the team's new head coach.

The January 6 home game against UTSA was played in the Jerabeck Activity and Athletic Center on the campus of the University of St. Thomas due to water damage to Tudor Fieldhouse.

== Previous season ==
The Owls finished the 2022–23 season 19–16, 8–12 in C-USA play to finish in a three-way tie for sixth place. As the No. 6 seed in the C-USA tournament, they defeated UTSA before losing to UAB. They received an invitation to the College Basketball Invitational where they defeated Duquesne before losing to Southern Utah in quarterfinals.

This was the last season for the team as members of Conference USA before joining the American Athletic Conference on July 1, 2023.

== Offseason ==
=== Departures ===
Name	Number	Pos.	Height	Weight	Year	Hometown	Reason for departure
Jaden Geron	0	G	6'8"	175	Sophomore	Fresno, CA	Transferred to Montana
Seryee Lewis	1	F	6'9"	245	Sophomore	Chicago, IL	Transferred
Quincy Olivari	4	G	6'3"	200	Junior	Atlanta, GA	Transferred to Xavier
Mason Jones	10	G	6'4"	200	Freshman	Chicago, IL	Transferred to New Orleans
Ben Moffat	12	F	6'8"	225	Junior	Wichita Falls, TX	Walk-on; left the team for personal reasons
Reed Myers	14	G	6'0"	180	Junior	Phoenix, AZ	Walk-on; left the team for personal reasons
Damion McDowell Jr.	20	F	6'6"	190	Sophomore	Inglewood, CA	TBD
Jake Lieppert	24	G	6'4"	200	Junior	Scottsdale, AZ	Transferred to Minot State

=== Incoming transfers ===
Name	Number	Pos.	Height	Weight	Year	Hometown	Previous School
Sam Alajiki	0	F	6'7"	230	Junior	Dundalk, Ireland	California
Noah Shelby	1	G	6'3"	180	Sophomore	McKinney, TX	Vanderbilt
Anthony Selden	4	G	6'6"	220	Senior	Boston, MA	Garder–Webb

=== Recruiting classes ===
==== 2023 recruiting class ====
College recruiting information
Name	Hometown	School	Height	Weight	Commit date
Keanu Dawes #20 PF	Houston, TX	Stratford High School	6 ft 7 in (2.01 m)	200 lb (91 kg)	Oct 11, 2022
Keanu Dawes #20 PF	Recruit ratings: Scout: Rivals: 247Sports: ESPN: (82)				
Gabe Warren #31 PF	Glendale, AZ	Dream City Christian	6 ft 4 in (1.93 m)	200 lb (91 kg)	Oct 21, 2022
Gabe Warren #31 PF	Recruit ratings: Scout: Rivals: 247Sports: ESPN: (80)				
Overall recruit ranking:
Note: In many cases, Scout, Rivals, 247Sports, On3, and ESPN may conflict in their listings of height and weight.; In these cases, the average was taken. ESPN grades are on a 100-point scale.; Sources: "2023 Team Ranking". Rivals.

== Roster ==
2023–24 Rice Owls men's basketball team
Players
Coaches

Pos.	#	Name	Height	Weight	Year	Previous school	Hometown
F	0	Sam Alajiki	6 ft 7 in (2.01 m)	230 lb (104 kg)	Jr	St. Benedict's Prep; California	Dundalk, Ireland
G	1	Noah Shelby	6 ft 3 in (1.91 m)	185 lb (84 kg)	So	Greenhill School; Vanderbilt	McKinney, TX
G	2	Mekhi Mason	6 ft 5 in (1.96 m)	195 lb (88 kg)	So	Compass Prep	Gilbert, AZ
G	3	Travis Evee	6 ft 1 in (1.85 m)	180 lb (82 kg)	Sr	Vermont Academy; VMI	Randolph, MA
G	4	Anthony Selden	6 ft 6 in (1.98 m)	225 lb (102 kg)	Sr	Tilton School; Garder–Webb	Boston, MA
G/F	5	Cameron Sheffield	6 ft 6 in (1.98 m)	195 lb (88 kg)	Jr	Chattahoochee HS	Alpharetta, GA
G	10	Cole Andrews-Heitz (W)	6 ft 1 in (1.85 m)	170 lb (77 kg)	Fr	Rouse HS	Lenader, TX
C	11	Ifeanyi Ufchukwu	6 ft 10 in (2.08 m)	240 lb (109 kg)	So	Covenant Day School (NC)	Benin City, Nigeria
G	12	Camp Wagner	6 ft 6 in (1.98 m)	175 lb (79 kg)	Fr	Link Prep Academy (MO)	Dallas, TX
F	13	Andrew Akuchie	6 ft 11 in (2.11 m)	215 lb (98 kg)	So	St. Thomas Aquinas HS	Fort Lauderdale, FL
F	15	Max Fiedler	6 ft 11 in (2.11 m)	230 lb (104 kg)	Sr	Melbourne HS	Indialantic, FL
G	21	Gabe Warren	6 ft 6 in (1.98 m)	205 lb (93 kg)	Fr	John Paul II HS	Plano, TX
G	22	Jackson Peakes (W)	6 ft 4 in (1.93 m)	185 lb (84 kg)	RS So	St. John's HS	Houston, TX
G	23	Alem Huseinovic	6 ft 4 in (1.93 m)	185 lb (84 kg)	Sr	PHHoenix Prep; Nevada	Zenica, Bosnia and Herzegovina
F	24	Keanu Dawes	6 ft 9 in (2.06 m)	205 lb (93 kg)	Fr	Stratford HS	Houston, TX
F	30	George Perkins (W)	6 ft 8 in (2.03 m)	200 lb (91 kg)	RS Fr	Sidwell Friends School	Washington, D.C.

Head coach

- Scott Pera (Penn State)

Assistant coach(es)

- Van Green (Rice)
- Greg Howell (Waldorf)
- Russ Pennell (Central Arkansas)

Legend

- (C) Team captain
- (S) Suspended
- (I) Ineligible
- (W) Walk-on
- Injured
- Current redshirt

Roster

== Schedule and results ==
Date time, TV	Rank^{#}	Opponent^{#}	Result	Record	High points	High rebounds	High assists	Site (attendance) city, state
Exhibition
November 2, 2023*; 7:00 p.m.		Clayton State	W 80–57		11 – Evee	11 – Fiedler	3 – Shelby	Tudor Fieldhouse; Houston, TX
Non-conference regular season
November 7, 2023*; 7:00 p.m., ESPN+		St. Thomas (TX)	W 101–57	1–0	17 – Alajiki	11 – Fiedler	6 – Fiedler	Tudor Fieldhouse (1,746); Houston, TX
November 10, 2023*; 7:00 p.m., ESPN+		Harvard	L 76–89	1–1	20 – Mason	9 – Fiedler	5 – Tied	Tudor Fieldhouse (2,474); Houston, TX
November 15, 2023*; 8:00 p.m., LHN		at No. 19 Texas	L 64–80	1–2	17 – Selden	6 – Mason	5 – Fiedler	Moody Center (10,554); Austin, TX
November 21, 2023*; 5:30 p.m.		vs. Indiana State; Ball Dawgs Classic	L 88–103	1–3	25 – Evee	12 – Fiedler	6 – Fiedler	Dollar Loan Center; Henderson, NV
November 22, 2023*; 8:45 p.m.		vs. New Mexico; Ball Dawgs Classic	L 56–90	1–4	17 – Mason	7 – Fielder	3 – Tied	Dollar Loan Center; Henderson, NV
November 24, 2023*; 3:15 p.m.		vs. UC Irvine; Ball Dawgs Classic	L 68–83	1–5	17 – Evee	9 – Fiedler	4 – Fiedler	Dollar Loan Center; Henderson, NV
November 30, 2023*; 7:00 p.m., ESPN+		UT Martin	W 98–78	2–5	29 – Evee	11 – Fiedler	6 – Fiedler	Tudor Fieldhouse (1,656); Houston, TX
December 2, 2023*; 4:00 p.m., ESPN+		Houston Christian	W 65–56	3–5	18 – Evee	12 – Fiedler	10 – Fiedler	Tudor Fieldhouse (1,730); Houston, TX
December 6, 2023*; 7:00 p.m., ESPN+		at No. 3 Houston; Rivalry	L 39–75	3–6	10 – Huseinovic	6 – Mason	2 – Tied	Fertitta Center (7,159); Houston, TX
December 13, 2023*; 11:15 a.m., ESPN+		Incarnate Word	W 80–57	4–6	29 – Evee	10 – Fiedler	4 – Fiedler	Tudor Fieldhouse (3,466); Houston, TX
December 16, 2023*; 2:00 p.m., ESPN+		at Northwestern State	W 76–51	5–6	16 – Fiedler	8 – Tied	5 – Fiedler	Prather Coliseum (333); Natchitoches, LA
December 20, 2023*; 7:00 p.m., ESPN+		Prairie View A&M	W 82–56	6–6	28 – Evee	14 – Fiedler	4 – Tied	Tudor Fieldhouse (1,717); Houston, TX
December 22, 2023*; 7:00 p.m., ESPN+		Louisiana	L 67–84	6–7	18 – Tied	7 – Dawes	4 – Mason	Tudor Fieldhouse (2,232); Houston, TX
AAC regular season
January 3, 2024; 8:00 p.m., ESPNU		at Tulane	L 59–84	6–8 (0–1)	14 – Evee	6 – Fiedler	4 – Evee	Devlin Fieldhouse (1,232); New Orleans, LA
January 6, 2024; 2:00 p.m., ESPN+		UTSA	L 82–89 ^{OT}	6–9 (0–2)	25 – Evee	12 – Fiedler	8 – Fiedler	Jerabeck Activity and Athletic Center (1,424); Houston, TX
January 12, 2024; 6:00 p.m., ESPNU		at South Florida	L 73–81	6–10 (0–3)	18 – Mason	19 – Fiedler	4 – Tied	Yuengling Center (4,107); Tampa, FL
January 16, 2024; 7:00 p.m., ESPN+		Charlotte	L 79–81 ^{OT}	6–11 (0–4)	21 – Evee	10 – Fiedler	7 – Mason	Tudor Fieldhouse (1,699); Houston, TX
January 20, 2024; 1:00 p.m., ESPN+		at Temple	W 69–66	7–11 (1–4)	20 – Mason	9 – Fiedler	8 – Fiedler	Liacouras Center (4,007); Philadelphia, PA
January 24, 2024; 7:00 p.m., ESPN+		No. 22 Florida Atlantic	L 56–69	7–12 (1–5)	16 – Huseinovic	18 – Fiedler	8 – Fiedler	Tudor Fieldhouse (1,896); Houston, TX
January 27, 2024; 7:00 p.m., ESPNU		Tulsa	L 83–85	7–13 (1–6)	19 – Mason	11 – Fiedler	7 – Tied	Tudor Fieldhouse (3,621); Houston, TX
January 31, 2024; 7:00 p.m., ESPN+		at Memphis	W 74–71	8–13 (2–6)	17 – Mason	9 – Fiedler	5 – Fiedler	FedExForum (11,594); Memphis, TN
February 3, 2024; 2:00 p.m., ESPN+		at UTSA	W 80–76	9–13 (3–6)	30 – Mason	10 – Fiedler	7 – Fiedler	Convocation Center (1,387); San Antonio, TX
February 7, 2024; 7:00 p.m., ESPN+		SMU	L 69–95	9–14 (3–7)	20 – Huseinovic	4 – Tied	5 – Mason	Tudor Fieldhouse (1,934); Houston, TX
February 10, 2024; 2:00 p.m., ESPN+		South Florida	L 65–69	9–15 (3–8)	20 – Evee	13 – Fiedler	5 – Fiedler	Tudor Fieldhouse (1,982); Houston, TX
February 17, 2024; 2:00 p.m., ESPN+		at Tulsa	L 82–93 ^{OT}	9–16 (3–9)	21 – Evee	9 – Fiedler	5 – Mason	Reynolds Center (3,665); Tulsa, OK
February 21, 2024; 7:00 p.m., ESPN+		at UAB	W 94–71	10–16 (4–9)	19 – Mason	6 – Mason	6 – Mason	Bartow Arena (3,751); Birmingham, AL
February 24, 2024; 1:00 p.m., ESPNU		East Carolina	W 70–52	11–16 (5–9)	34 – Evee	8 – Fiedler	10 – Fiedler	Tudor Fieldhouse (3,808); Houston, TX
February 28, 2024; 7:00 p.m., ESPNU		Temple	L 43–65	11–17 (5–10)	12 – Fiedler	9 – Fiedler	2 – Evee	Tudor Fieldhouse (2,456); Houston, TX
March 2, 2024; 6:00 p.m., ESPN+		at Wichita State	L 66–87	11–18 (5–11)	18 – Evee	6 – Fiedler	5 – Mason	Charles Koch Arena (7,034); Wichita, KS
March 6, 2024; 6:00 p.m., ESPN+		at Charlotte	L 64–69	11–19 (5–12)	20 – Evee	10 – Fiedler	4 – Tied	Dale F. Halton Arena (3,027); Charlotte, NC
March 9, 2024; 7:00 p.m., ESPN+		North Texas	L 55–71	11–20 (5–13)	21 – Evee	10 – Fiedler	4 – Fiedler	Tudor Fieldhouse (2,937); Houston, TX
AAC Tournament
March 13, 2024; 12:00 p.m., ESPN+	(13)	vs. (12) Wichita State; First Round	L 81–88	11–21	24 – Evee	10 – Akuchie	12 – Fiedler	Dickies Arena; Fort Worth, TX
*Non-conference game. ^{#}Rankings from AP Poll. (#) Tournament seedings in parentheses. All times are in Central.

== See also ==
- 2023–24 Rice Owls women's basketball team
