= 2023–24 South Florida Bulls men's basketball team =

American college basketball season

2023–24 South Florida Bulls men's basketball

AAC regular season champions

NIT, Second round
- Conference: American Athletic Conference
- Record: 25–8 (16–2 AAC)
- Head coach: Amir Abdur-Rahim (1st season)
- Assistant coaches: Ben Fletcher; Desmond Oliver; William Small
- Home arena: Yuengling Center

2023–24 American Athletic Conference men's basketball standings
	Conf.				Overall
Team	W		L	PCT	W		L	PCT
South Florida	16	–	2	.889	25	–	8	.758
Florida Atlantic	14	–	4	.778	25	–	9	.735
Charlotte	13	–	5	.722	19	–	12	.613
UAB †	12	–	6	.667	23	–	12	.657
Memphis	11	–	7	.611	22	–	10	.688
SMU	11	–	7	.611	20	–	13	.606
North Texas	10	–	8	.556	19	–	15	.559
East Carolina	7	–	11	.389	15	–	18	.455
Tulsa	7	–	11	.389	16	–	15	.516
Tulane	5	–	13	.278	14	–	17	.452
Temple	5	–	13	.278	16	–	20	.444
Wichita State	5	–	13	.278	15	–	19	.441
Rice	5	–	13	.278	11	–	21	.344
UTSA	5	–	13	.278	11	–	21	.344
† 2024 AAC tournament winner

The 2023–24 South Florida Bulls men's basketball team represented the University of South Florida during the 2023–24 NCAA Division I men's basketball season. The season marked the 52nd basketball season for USF, the eleventh as a member of the American Athletic Conference, and the first (and only) season under head coach Amir Abdur-Rahim. The Bulls played their home games at Yuengling Center on the university's Tampa, Florida campus.

In the Week 14 poll on February 12, 2024, USF received five votes in the Coaches Poll (unofficially ranking them 40th), marking the first time since the final poll of the 2011–12 season in which USF has received votes in the Coaches Poll. In addition, the school also received seven votes in the AP poll (unofficially ranking them 43rd), also marking the first time the school received votes in both polls in the same week, along with only the third time the school received votes in the AP poll, after receiving 58 in the Week 6 poll in 1991–92 and two in the Week 13 poll in 2009–10. The following week (Week 15), the school set a record for most votes received in the Coaches Poll, receiving 45 in AP and 35 in Coaches (unofficially ranking them 31st and 29th, respectively).

In their February 18 win against No. 24 Florida Atlantic, USF set a new attendance record with 10,659 fans packing the Yuengling Center.

On February 25 after their win against SMU combined with losses by Charlotte and Florida Atlantic that weekend, USF clinched at least a share of the conference regular season title for the first time in school history. On March 2, they would clinch the outright title with their win over Charlotte.

In the Week 16 poll on February 26, 2024, USF was ranked No. 25 in both the AP and Coaches polls, marking the first time in school history the team was officially ranked in either poll.

The Bulls were ranked No. 24 in both the AP and Coaches polls during week 17. After a loss to Tulsa in the final game of the season, USF would drop out of the AP Top 25 for week 18; however, they would receive votes, unofficially ranking them 27th in the nation. That loss would also snap the Bulls program record setting 15-game win streak.

On March 15, Amir Abdur-Rahim was named a Naismith College Coach of the Year semifinalist. Two days later, the Bulls were given a berth in the National Invitation Tournament, their first postseason berth since 2018–19. They beat rival Central Florida in the first round their 25th win of the season setting a new program record before losing to VCU in the second round, ending their season.

== Previous season ==
The Bulls finished the 2022–23 season 14–18, 7–11 in AAC play, to finish in eighth place. They lost in the first round of the AAC tournament to East Carolina.

On March 10, 2023, the school fired head coach Brian Gregory after six seasons. On March 29, the school named Kennesaw State head coach Amir Abdur-Rahim the team's new head coach.

== Offseason ==
=== Departures ===
Name	Number	Pos.	Height	Weight	Year	Hometown	Reason for departure
Ryan Conwell	0	G	6'4"	195	Freshman	Indianapolis, IN	Transferred to Indiana State
Tyler Harris	2	G	5'9"	150	GS Senior	Memphis, TN	Graduated
DJ Patrick	3	F	6'6"	200	Sophomore	Powder Springs, GA	Transferred to Charleston Southern
Dok Muordar	4	F	6'11"	200	Freshman	Rumbek, South Sudan	Transferred to Cleveland State
Jake Boggs	5	F	6'7"	200	Junior	Charlotte, NC	Transferred
Serrel Smith Jr.	10	G	6'4"	175	Senior	St. Petersburg, FL	Graduated
Trey Moss	11	G	6'3"	180	Sophomore	Orlando, FL	Transferred to William & Mary
Mark Calleja	13	G	6'2"	185	Senior	Hudson, FL	Walk-on; graduated
Kenu Louissaint	22	G/F	6'3"	205	Senior	Port-au-Prince, Haiti	Graduated
Keyshawn Bryant	23	F	6'6"	190	GS Senior	Winter Haven, FL	Graduated
Jamir Chaplin	24	G	6'5"	200	Junior	Norcross, GA	Transferred to Little Rock
Russel Tchewa	54	C	7'0"	280	Junior	Douala, Cameroon	Transferred to Georgia

=== Incoming transfers ===
Name	Num	Pos.	Height	Weight	Year	Hometown	Previous school
Josh Placer	2	G	6'1"	184	RS Senior	Orlando, FL	North Florida
Chris Youngblood	3	G	6'4"	218	Senior	Tuscaloosa, AL	Kennesaw State
Kobe Knox	4	G	6'5"	195	RS Sophomore	Tampa, FL	Grand Canyon
Brandon Stroud	5	G	6'6"	200	Senior	Atlanta, GA	Kennesaw State
Kasean Pryor	11	F	6'10"	200	Junior	Chicago, IL	Northwest Florida State College
Kasen Jennings	13	G	6'3"	202	Senior	Atlanta, GA	Kennesaw State
Gerald Jones III	21	F	6'11"	225	Junior	Wolfeboro, NH	Saddleback College
David Ogunleye	22	F	6'9"	235	Junior	Houston, TX	Chabot College

=== Recruiting classes ===
==== 2023 recruiting class ====
College recruiting information
Name	Hometown	School	Height	Weight	Commit date
Jayden Reid; PG	Des Moines, IA	Grandview Park Baptist School	5 ft 10 in (1.78 m)	160 lb (73 kg)	May 17, 2023
Jayden Reid; PG	Recruit ratings: Rivals: 247Sports:				
Daniel Tobiloba; C	Des Moines, IA	Grandview Park Baptist School	7 ft 0 in (2.13 m)	238 lb (108 kg)	Apr 12, 2023
Daniel Tobiloba; C	Recruit ratings: No ratings found				
Overall recruit ranking:
Note: In many cases, Scout, Rivals, 247Sports, On3, and ESPN may conflict in their listings of height and weight.; In these cases, the average was taken. ESPN grades are on a 100-point scale.; Sources: "2023 Team Ranking". Rivals.

== Roster ==
2023–24 South Florida Bulls men's basketball team
Players
Coaches

Pos.	#	Name	Height	Weight	Year	Previous school	Hometown
G	0	Jayden Reid	5 ft 10 in (1.78 m)	161 lb (73 kg)	Fr	Long Island Lutheran	Westbury, NY
G/F	1	Selton Miguel	6 ft 4 in (1.93 m)	210 lb (95 kg)	Jr	Kansas State	Luanda, Angola
G	2	Jose Placer	6 ft 1 in (1.85 m)	184 lb (83 kg)	RS Sr	North Florida	Orlando, FL
G	3	Chris Youngblood	6 ft 4 in (1.93 m)	218 lb (99 kg)	Sr	Kennesaw State	Tuscaloosa, AL
G	4	Kobe Knox	6 ft 5 in (1.96 m)	195 lb (88 kg)	RS So	Grand Canyon	Tampa, FL
G	5	Brandon Stroud	6 ft 6 in (1.98 m)	200 lb (91 kg)	Sr	Kennesaw State	Atlanta, GA
F	11	Kasean Pryor	6 ft 10 in (2.08 m)	200 lb (91 kg)	Jr	Northwest Florida State College	Chicago, IL
G	13	Kasen Jennings	6 ft 3 in (1.91 m)	202 lb (92 kg)	Sr	Kennesaw State	Atlanta, GA
G	14	Ammaar Balagam (W)	6 ft 4 in (1.93 m)	185 lb (84 kg)	Fr	Stone Mountain HS	Tucker, GA
F	15	Corey Walker Jr.	6 ft 8 in (2.03 m)	215 lb (98 kg)	RS Jr	Tennessee	Jacksonville, FL
F	20	Sam Hines Jr.	6 ft 6 in (1.98 m)	215 lb (98 kg)	Jr	Denver	Marietta, GA
F	21	Gerald Jones III	6 ft 10 in (2.08 m)	220 lb (100 kg)	So	Saddleback College	Wolfeboro, NH
F	22	David Ogunleye	6 ft 9 in (2.06 m)	235 lb (107 kg)	Jr	Chabot College	Houston, TX
G	33	Nic Smith (W)	6 ft 0 in (1.83 m)	168 lb (76 kg)	Fr	Whitnall HS	Milwaukee, WI
C	34	Daniel Tobiloba	7 ft 0 in (2.13 m)	238 lb (108 kg)	Fr	Grand View Christian	Des Moines, IA

Head coach

- Amir Abdur-Rahim (Southeastern Louisiana)

Assistant coach(es)

- Ben Fletcher (Troy)
- Desmond Oliver (Dominican (NY))
- William Small (Belhaven)

Legend

- (C) Team captain
- (S) Suspended
- (I) Ineligible
- (W) Walk-on
- Injured
- Current redshirt

Roster
Last update: March 23, 2024

== Preseason ==
=== AAC Coaches Poll ===
USF was selected to finish ninth out of 14 in the American Athletic Conference preseason coaches poll.

Predicted finish	Team	Votes (1st place)
1	Florida Atlantic	167 (11)
2	Memphis	159 (3)
3	Tulane	142
4	UAB	128
5	East Carolina	105
6	North Texas	100
7	SMU	97
8	Wichita State	90
9	South Florida	62
10	Tulsa	59
11	Rice	56
12	Temple	49
13	Charlotte	46
14	UTSA	14

== Schedule and results ==
Date time, TV	Rank^{#}	Opponent^{#}	Result	Record	High points	High rebounds	High assists	Site (attendance) city, state
Exhibition
November 2, 2023*; 7:00 p.m.		Edward Waters	W 94–49	–	15 – Miguel	10 – Pryor	6 – Miguel	Yuengling Center (1,188); Tampa, FL
Non-conference regular season
November 9, 2023*; 7:00 p.m., ESPN+		South Carolina State	W 96–52	1–0	19 – Youngblood	5 – Reid	10 – Reid	Yuengling Center (3,807); Tampa, FL
November 15, 2023*; 7:00 p.m., ESPN+		Central Michigan	L 63–68	1–1	20 – Youngblood	9 – Walker Jr.	2 – Reid	Yuengling Center (2,965); Tampa, FL
November 19, 2023*; 5:00 p.m., ESPN+		Northern Iowa	W 74–65	2–1	21 – Placer	7 – Miguel	4 – Youngblood	Yuengling Center (4,534); Tampa, FL
November 22, 2023*; 7:00 p.m., ESPN+		Maine	L 59–70	2–2	17 – Youngblood	12 – Pryor	5 – Reid	Yuengling Center (3,134); Tampa, FL
November 30, 2023*; 7:00 p.m., FloSports		at Hofstra	L 63–82	2–3	10 – tied	12 – Hines Jr.	5 – Reid	Mack Sports Complex (1,758); Hempstead, NY
December 2, 2023*; 1:00 p.m., NESN		at UMass	L 56–66	2–4	16 – Miguel	5 – Miguel	4 – Miguel	Mullins Center (3,254); Amherst, MA
December 9, 2023*; 1:30 p.m., ACCN		vs. Florida State; Orange Bowl Basketball Classic	W 88–72	3–4	20 – Miguel	10 – Pryor	3 – Knox	Amerant Bank Arena (–); Sunrise, FL
December 12, 2023*; 7:00 p.m., ESPN+		Arkansas–Pine Bluff	W 104–86	4–4	19 – Pryor	8 – tied	8 – Reid	Yuengling Center (2,643); Tampa, FL
December 17, 2023*; 4:00 p.m., ESPN+		Loyola Chicago	W 77–64	5–4	21 – Miguel	6 – Reid	4 – Youngblood	Yuengling Center (4,959); Tampa, FL
December 22, 2023*; 2:00 p.m., ESPN+		Albany	W 89–73	6–4	23 – Youngblood	12 – Stroud	4 – Youngblood	Yuengling Center (2,759); Tampa, FL
December 29, 2023*; 7:00 p.m., ESPN+		Alabama State	W 73–70	7–4	26 – Youngblood	9 – Hines Jr.	4 – Reid	Yuengling Center (3,284); Tampa, FL
AAC regular season
January 4, 2024; 7:00 p.m., ESPN+		Temple	W 76–68	8–4 (1–0)	17 – Youngblood	9 – Pryor	6 – Pryor	Yuengling Center (3,388); Tampa, FL
January 7, 2024; 3:00 p.m., ESPN+		at UAB	L 71–75	8–5 (1–1)	17 – tied	8 – Pryor	3 – Stroud	Bartow Arena (3,677); Birmingham, AL
January 12, 2024; 7:00 p.m., ESPNU		Rice	W 81–73	9–5 (2–1)	29 – Pryor	7 – Hines Jr.	5 – Reid	Yuengling Center (4,107); Tampa, FL
January 18, 2024; 7:00 p.m., ESPN		at No. 10 Memphis	W 74–73	10–5 (3–1)	23 – Miguel	10 – Pryor	3 – tied	FedExForum (10,531); Memphis, TN
January 21, 2024; 2:00 p.m., ESPN+		Wichita State	W 72–68	11–5 (4–1)	25 – Pryor	10 – Pryor	4 – Knox	Yuengling Center (4,414); Tampa, FL
January 24, 2024; 7:00 p.m., ESPN+		at Temple	W 75–69	12–5 (5–1)	20 – Pryor	10 – Pryor	5 – Miguel	Liacouras Center (3,505); Philadelphia, PA
January 27, 2024; 4:00 p.m., ESPN+		UTSA	W 89–72	13–5 (6–1)	18 – Knox	12 – Stroud	6 – Miguel	Yuengling Center (5,271); Tampa, FL
January 31, 2024; 7:00 p.m., ESPN+		at East Carolina	W 71–60	14–5 (7–1)	20 – Youngblood	12 – Stroud	6 – Youngblood	Williams Arena (4,053); Greenville, NC
February 3, 2024; 6:00 p.m., ESPN+		at North Texas	W 60–55	15–5 (8–1)	16 – Youngblood	12 – Pryor	4 – Stroud	The Super Pit (4,316); Denton, TX
February 6, 2024; 9:00 p.m., ESPN2		Charlotte	W 72–69	16–5 (9–1)	22 – Miguel	7 – Stroud	5 – Miguel	Yuengling Center (6,156); Tampa, FL
February 10, 2024; 3:00 p.m., ESPN+		at Rice	W 69–65	17–5 (10–1)	24 – Youngblood	10 – Pryor	6 – Knox	Tudor Fieldhouse (1,982); Houston, TX
February 14, 2024; 7:00 p.m., ESPNU		Tulsa	W 69–50	18–5 (11–1)	14 – Knox	11 – Pryor	5 – Pryor	Yuengling Center (4,559); Tampa, FL
February 18, 2024; 12:00 p.m., ESPN		No. 24 Florida Atlantic	W 90–86	19–5 (12–1)	25 – Miguel	10 – Walker Jr.	3 – Walker Jr.	Yuengling Center (10,659); Tampa, FL
February 21, 2024; 8:00 p.m., ESPN+		at UTSA	W 66–61	20–5 (13–1)	17 – Miguel	10 – Pryor	4 – Pryor	Convocation Center (1,580); San Antonio, TX
February 25, 2024; 12:00 p.m., ESPN2		SMU	W 79–68	21–5 (14–1)	19 – Pryor	9 – Pryor	5 – Youngblood	Yuengling Center (10,251); Tampa, FL
March 2, 2024; 4:00 p.m., ESPN+	No. 25	at Charlotte	W 76–61	22–5 (15–1)	17 – Youngblood	10 – Stroud	3 – Miguel	Dale F. Halton Arena (7,024); Charlotte, NC
March 5, 2024; 7:00 p.m., ESPN+	No. 24	Tulane	W 85–72	23–5 (16–1)	29 – Youngblood	5 – tied	6 – Reid	Yuengling Center (10,354); Tampa, FL
March 9, 2024; 3:00 p.m., ESPN+	No. 24	at Tulsa	L 70–76	23–6 (16–2)	29 – Pryor	11 – Pryor	3 – Miguel	Reynolds Center (5,515); Tulsa, OK
AAC tournament
March 15, 2024*; 1:00 p.m., ESPN2	(1)	vs. (8) East Carolina; Quarterfinals	W 81–59	24–6	17 – Knox	10 – Pryor	8 – Stroud	Dickies Arena; Fort Worth, TX
March 16, 2024*; 3:00 p.m., ESPN2	(1)	vs. (4) UAB; Semifinals	L 83–93	24–7	19 – Miguel	15 – Pryor	5 – Pryor	Dickies Arena; Fort Worth, TX
NIT
March 19, 2024*; 9:00 p.m., ESPN+		at (4) UCF; First round – Villanova bracket War on I-4	W 83–77	25–7	19 – Miguel	9 – Stroud	3 – Stroud	Addition Financial Arena (4,164); Orlando, FL
March 24, 2024*; 7:30 p.m., ESPNU		VCU; Second round – Villanova bracket	L 65–70	25–8	28 – Youngblood	10 – Pryor	3 – Pryor	Yuengling Center (6,398); Tampa, FL
*Non-conference game. ^{#}Rankings from AP poll. (#) Tournament seedings in parentheses. All times are in Eastern Time.

== Awards and recognition ==
=== Players ===
==== Conference Player of the Year ====
- Chris Youngblood

==== All-Conference First Team ====
- Chris Youngblood

==== All-Conference Second Team ====
- Selton Miguel

==== All-Conference Freshman Team ====
- Jayden Reid

=== Coaches ===
==== Conference Coach of the Year ====
- Amir Abdur-Rahim (unanimous)

== Rankings ==
Ranking movements Legend: ██ Increase in ranking ██ Decrease in ranking — = Not ranked RV = Received votes
	Week																				
Poll	Pre	1	2	3	4	5	6	7	8	9	10	11	12	13	14	15	16	17	18	19	Final
AP	—	—	—	—	—	—	—	—	—	—	—	—	—	—	RV	RV	25	24	RV	RV	
Coaches	—	—	—	—	—	—	—	—	—	—	—	—	—	—	RV	RV	25	24	RV	—	
