= San Ysidro High School =

Public high school in San Diego, California, United States

Location
- 5353 Airway Road; San Diego, California 92154; United States; 32°33′55.35″N 117°01′02.21″W

Information
- Motto: ROAR [Responsibility, On Time, Attitude, and Respect]
- Established: 2002
- School district: Sweetwater Union High School District
- Superintendent: Moisés G. Aguirre
- Principal: Maria Jaramillo
- Teaching staff: 92.66 (FTE)
- Grades: 9-12
- Enrollment: 2,017 (2023–2024)
- Student to teacher ratio: 21.77
- Colors: Baby Blue and gold
- Nickname: Cougars
- Newspaper: Cougar Live
- Website: syh.sweetwaterschools.org

San Ysidro High School (SYHS) is a public four-year high school in San Diego, California. Serving grade levels 9–12, it was founded in 2002 and is part of Sweetwater Union High School District. SYHS predominantly serves San Ysidro and other parts of San Diego with a student enrollment of 2,408.

== History ==
San Ysidro High School (SYHS) was established in the summer of 2002, and was named after the community in which the institution predominantly serves, "San Ysidro, California." Before its establishment, the community did not have a high school where the nearby K-8 educational district, San Ysidro Elementary School District, could feed students. This resulted in many middle school students transferring to different schools within Sweetwater Union High School District, such as Southwest Senior High School. However, once the school opened, many students began enrolling, as it was much closer than neighboring schools.

In November 2015, a transgender student at the school was nominated for homecoming queen. The student was one of five seniors in the running, but another student was ultimately crowned.

=== Class of 2019 Valedictorian Speech ===
On June 6, 2019, Nataly Buhr, the valedictorian from the school, delivered a graduation speech that gained significant attention for its candid critiques of school staff. While initially expressing gratitude toward supportive teachers, the speech pivoted to address issues she faced, notably calling out her counselor for unavailability and a teacher who reportedly attended class while intoxicated. Following the ceremony, the speech garnered the attention of news outlets around the United States and went viral on many social media platforms. A video detailing the incident, created by the YouTube channel "NowThis News" amassed over 8 million views. Following the internet virality of the situation, Sweetwater Union High School District released a statement denying many of the accusations presented in the speech, citing that the speech was not pre-approved and contained "rumors regarding misconduct."

== Demographics ==
Of the students enrolled at San Ysidro High School, 51.6% are male, 48.4% are female. Racial and ethnic breakdown is 88.1% Hispanic or Latino, 3.5% Asian, 1.3% multi-racial 1.6% black, 5.1% caucasian, with 0.3% or less of indigenous.

In addition, 66% of students qualified for free or reduced lunch prices in 2020.

== Programs and achievements ==
- 'CougarBots' Robotics Team - Competed at the 2017, 2019, 2020, 2022, and 2023 VEX Robotics World Competition. Winner of Amaze Award in 2022 and Inspire Award in 2023 at VEX Worlds

== Athletics ==
San Ysidro High School competes in the Metropolitan – Mesa League under the South Bay League of the CIF San Diego Section. Athletic programs that are offered across three seasons:

- Fall sports: football, volleyball (women), water polo (men), tennis (women), cross country (men/women), and golf (women)
- Winter sports: soccer (men/women), basketball (men/women), wrestling (men/women), roller hockey, and water polo (women)
- Spring sports: track and field (men/women), golf (men), tennis (men), baseball, swim and dive (men/women), softball, volleyball (men), beach volleyball (women), and lacrosse (men/women)

== Notable alumni ==
- Miguel Ángel Ponce, Class of 2007 - Soccer Player for CD Guadalajara
- Mikey Williams, Class of 2023 - Basketball Player.
