= Raleigh Christian Academy =

Private school in Raleigh, North Carolina

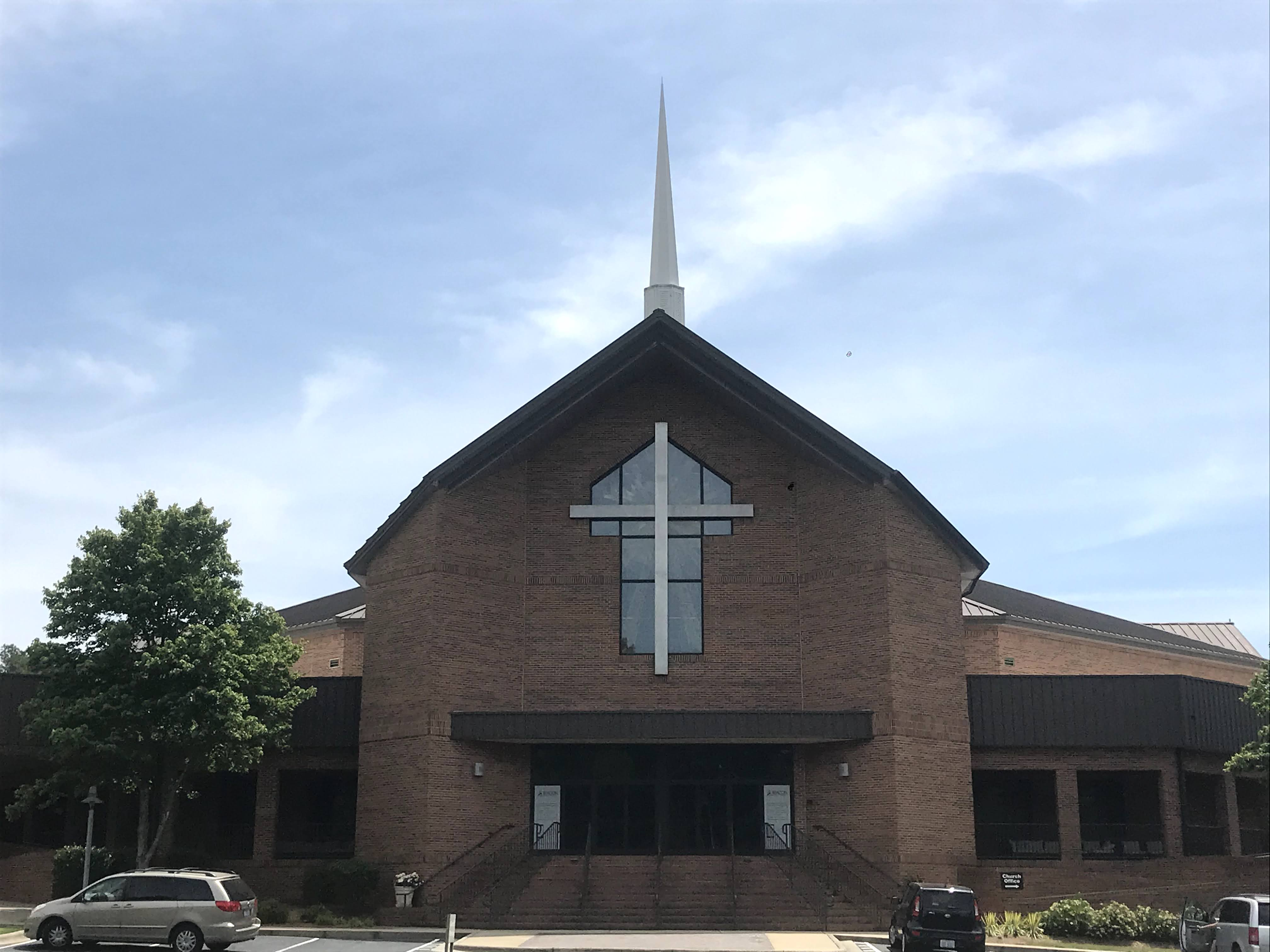
- The front of the Raleigh Christian Academy building

Location
- 2110 Trawick Road; Raleigh, North Carolina 27604; United States
- Coordinates: 35°48′31″N 78°34′34″W

Information
- Type: Private
- Religious affiliation: Protestant Christian
- Denomination: Independent Baptist
- Established: 1977 (49 years ago)
- CEEB code: 343238
- Administrator: Dwight Ausley
- Staff: 60
- Faculty: 35
- Grades: K–12
- Enrollment: 339
- Campus: Suburban, 25 acres
- Colors: Navy, white, and red
- Mascot: Eagles
- Accreditation: AACS, NCCSA
- Tuition: $5,908 (grades 6–12) $5,584 (grades 1–5)
- Affiliation: Beacon Baptist Church
- Website: www.raleighchristian.com

Raleigh Christian Academy (RCA) is a private, Christian, coeducational, primary and secondary day school located in Raleigh, North Carolina, United States. Also referred to as simply Raleigh Christian, the school seeks to educate students in a traditional Christian environment.

== History ==
In the fall of 1977, 17 students and 2 teachers met together in the facilities of Beacon Baptist Church (then named First Free Will Baptist Church) in the inaugural year of Raleigh Christian Academy. Pastor Emeritus Randy Cox chose Richard and Gwen Tippett to come and help start the school. With both teaching (and Dr. Tippett doubling as the academy principal) the school began simply with combination classes of kindergarten four- and five-year-olds and first and second graders. Each year, another grade was added, as well as a teacher for that grade. Adding growth slowly and deliberately was by design so that the church could adjust to classroom and faculty needs in a gradual manner.

In 1987, under the leadership of Dr. Tippett, Raleigh Christian Academy produced its very first graduating class with 11 seniors receiving diplomas from the school. Since then, hundreds of students have graduated from Raleigh Christian Academy. Today, RCA has an enrollment in preschool through 12th grade of nearly 350 students, a faculty of 35, and a total staff of 60.

== Academics ==
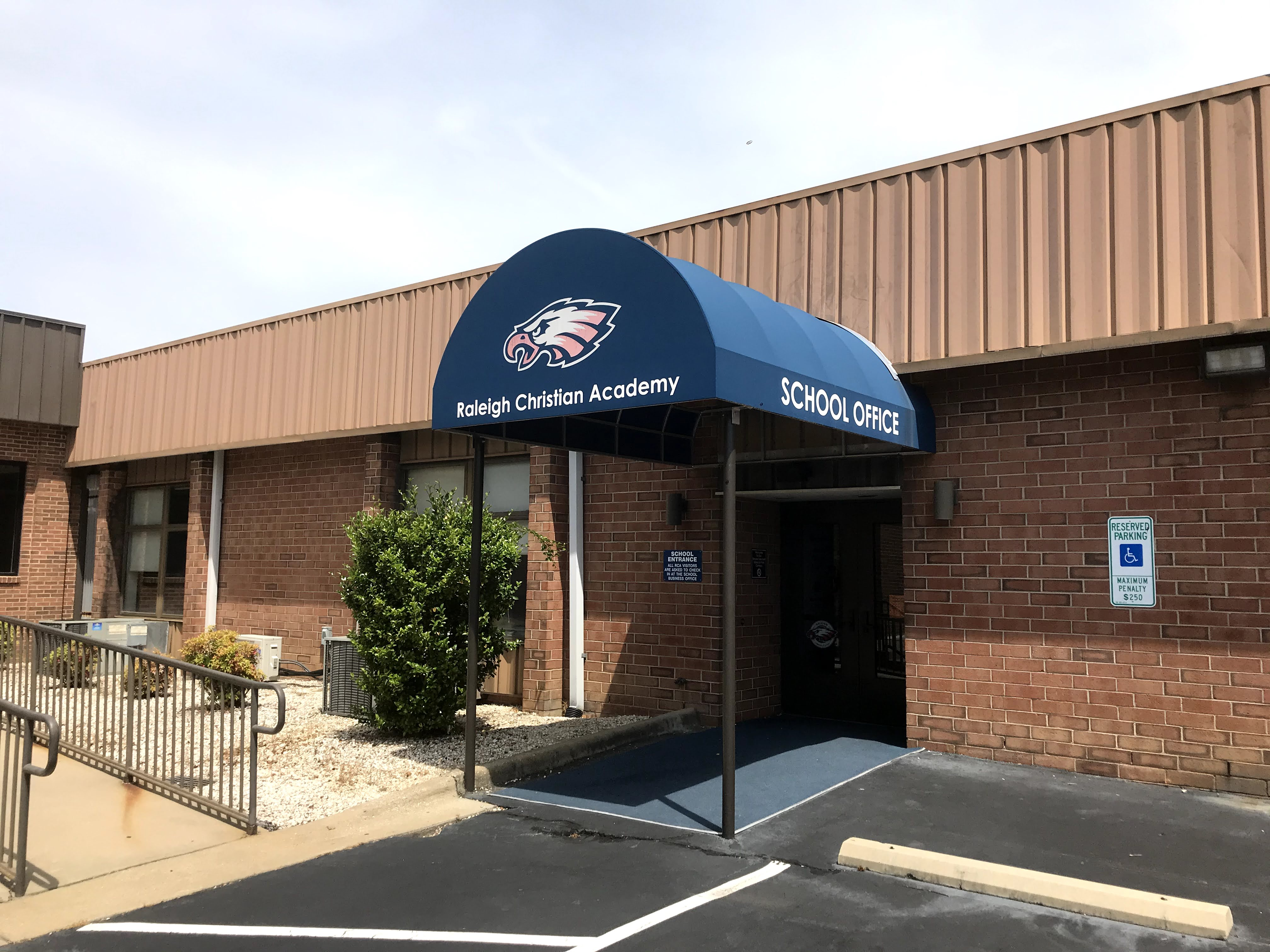
The school office of Raleigh Christian Academy

=== Preschool ===
RCA offers a preschool program for children aged four. They are introduced to phonics, cursive writing, language development skills, and the Bible. Raleigh Christian Academy's stated goal is to provide essential academic skills and character traits that will prepare them for kindergarten and elementary school.

=== Kindergarten ===
In the kindergarten program, students are taught the phonics approach to reading. In math, students count up to one hundred. Using the A Beka Book Curriculum, RCA's kindergarten students are taught cursive writing, adding, subtracting, telling time, recognizing and counting money. Science, social studies, health, and the Bible are also taught in the program.

=== Elementary school ===
RCA's elementary school students are taught in a classroom setting focusing on the basics. Each elementary grade has daily classes in Bible, math, phonics/language, spelling, writing, as well as health, history, science, and foreign language. First graders learn sentence structure, while multiplication and division skills are taught in second grade. Parts of speech are introduced in third grade, and students learn to diagram in grade four. Fifth grade students do a complete research paper in preparation for their middle school years.

=== Middle school ===
Students have the option to enroll in the academy's accelerated math program. RCA's middle school includes changing classes, lockers, and more prominent field trips. With the academy's curriculum, students also prepare science projects, research projects, take computer classes, and participate in physical education daily.

=== High school ===
High school students are offered honors courses as well as accelerated math program. The school has a small teacher-student ratio in order to keep instruction personal and allow for more individual attention. Raleigh Christian Academy is accredited by the North Carolina Christian School Association (NCCSA) and is in the final stages of gaining accreditation through the American Association of Christian Schools (AACS).

The stated goal of the academy is to meet the needs and challenges facing students as they prepare for college. During the last fifteen years, RCA's SAT results for graduating seniors has averaged 150 points higher than the North Carolina average and over 100 points higher than the national average. SAT scores average between 1150 and 1250.

== Fine arts ==
=== Music ===
Weekly music classes are taught to all students beginning in kindergarten. Students may try out for choirs beginning in fourth grade. The senior high choir, chorale, and ensemble have received numerous awards and recognized nationally for their performances. Students may join one of RCA's three band programs and begin individual lessons starting in fourth grade. Individual piano lessons are offered before, during, or after school. The school offers a strings program after school four days each week. Students may take private voice lessons that are taught by the academy's music faculty. Two handbell choirs are offered to students in middle school and senior high.

=== Art ===
Weekly art classes are available to all academy students beginning in kindergarten. Art electives are offered to students at RCA beginning in the middle school grades and continuing into senior high school where students can take art courses for credit.

=== Speech and oratory ===
Senior high students at Raleigh Christian Academy are required to take a half credit speech and public speaking course as a part of their graduation requirements. Students participate in regular speech and oratory activities on campus and participate in fine arts competitions during the spring semester.

== Athletics ==
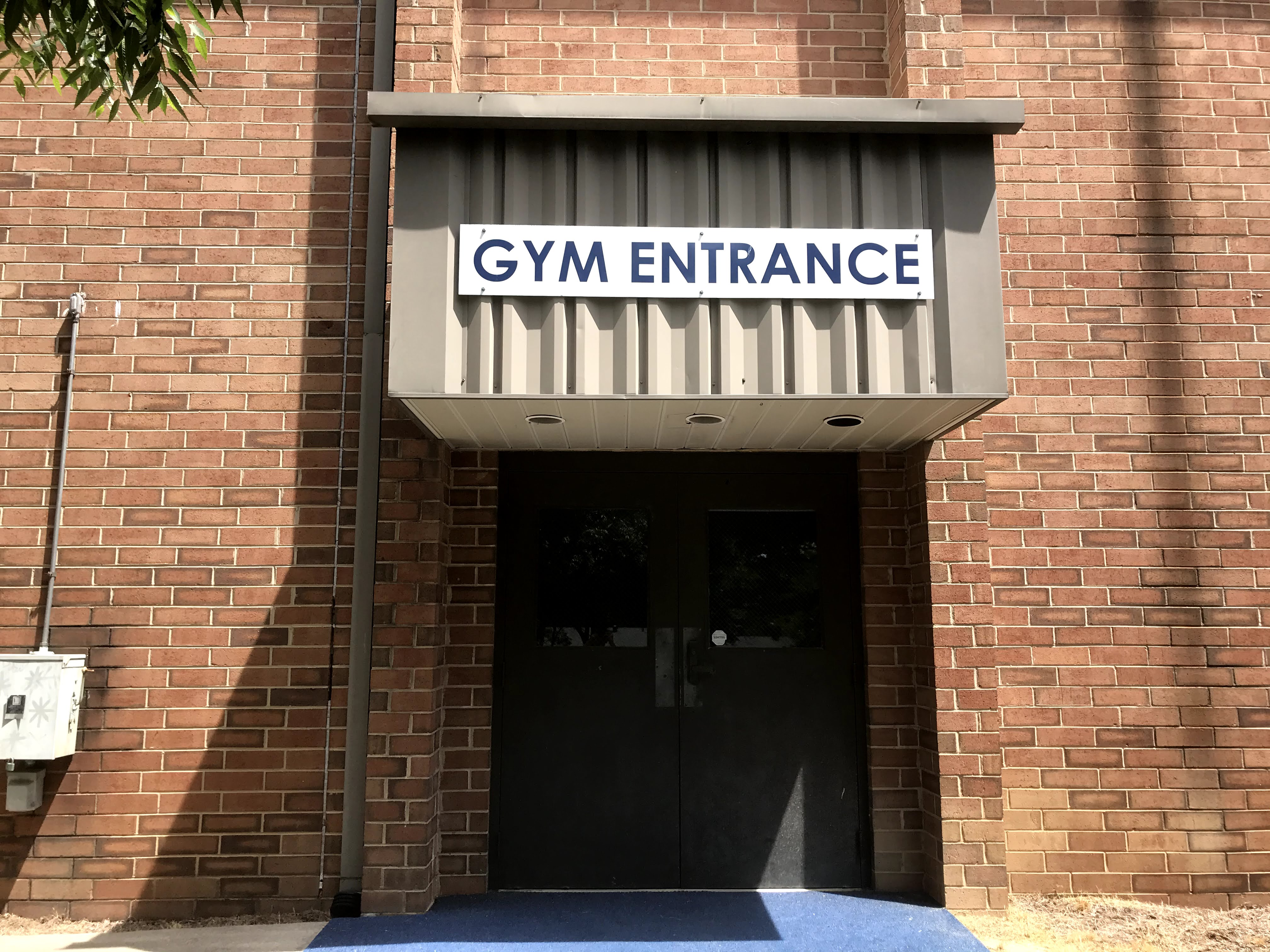
The gym entrance of Raleigh Christian Academy

RCA offers a range of sports for both middle school and high school students. Girls' sports include soccer, volleyball, cheerleading, and basketball. Soccer, basketball, and baseball, are offered for the boys.

== Corporal punishment controversy ==
In 1984, RCA assistant principal Dwight Ausley was found guilty of child abuse, after he paddled a ten-year-old student who failed to complete a homework assignment. School officials stated the paddling was due to the child's defiant behavior when confronted by the teacher and not due to the missed homework assignment. When the child's mother complained to then RCA principal Richard Tippett about the punishment of her child which left bruises for three weeks, Tippett responded by giving her a taped sermon by Pastor Randy Cox (then pastor of the church associated with Raleigh Christian Academy). In the sermon, Pastor Cox (retired) paraphrased a passage from the Bible by stating, "Better a son dead than disobedient." This account has been disputed by the school. During the trial, District Attorney Deborah Shandles stated that "the child lost his breath and lost his balance and he (Ausley) was so engrossed in the beating he did not notice.... He chose to beat a 10-year-old child to teach him a lesson he would not forget for a long time, all for a homework assignment. That is not an accident, that is malice."

On appeal, Ausley was found not guilty by an 11–1 vote. During the appeal, it was discovered that the noted bruising was in fact caused by corporal punishment administered post-incident at home by the child's own father. The superior court judge subsequently dismissed the case. The state appealed the dismissal which brought the case to the court of appeals. The appeals court upheld the superior court's decision to dismiss all charges.

The school no longer uses employee-administered corporal punishment. None of the involved parties are still involved with the school leadership.
