= Mikey Williams (basketball, born 2004) =

American basketball player (born 2004)

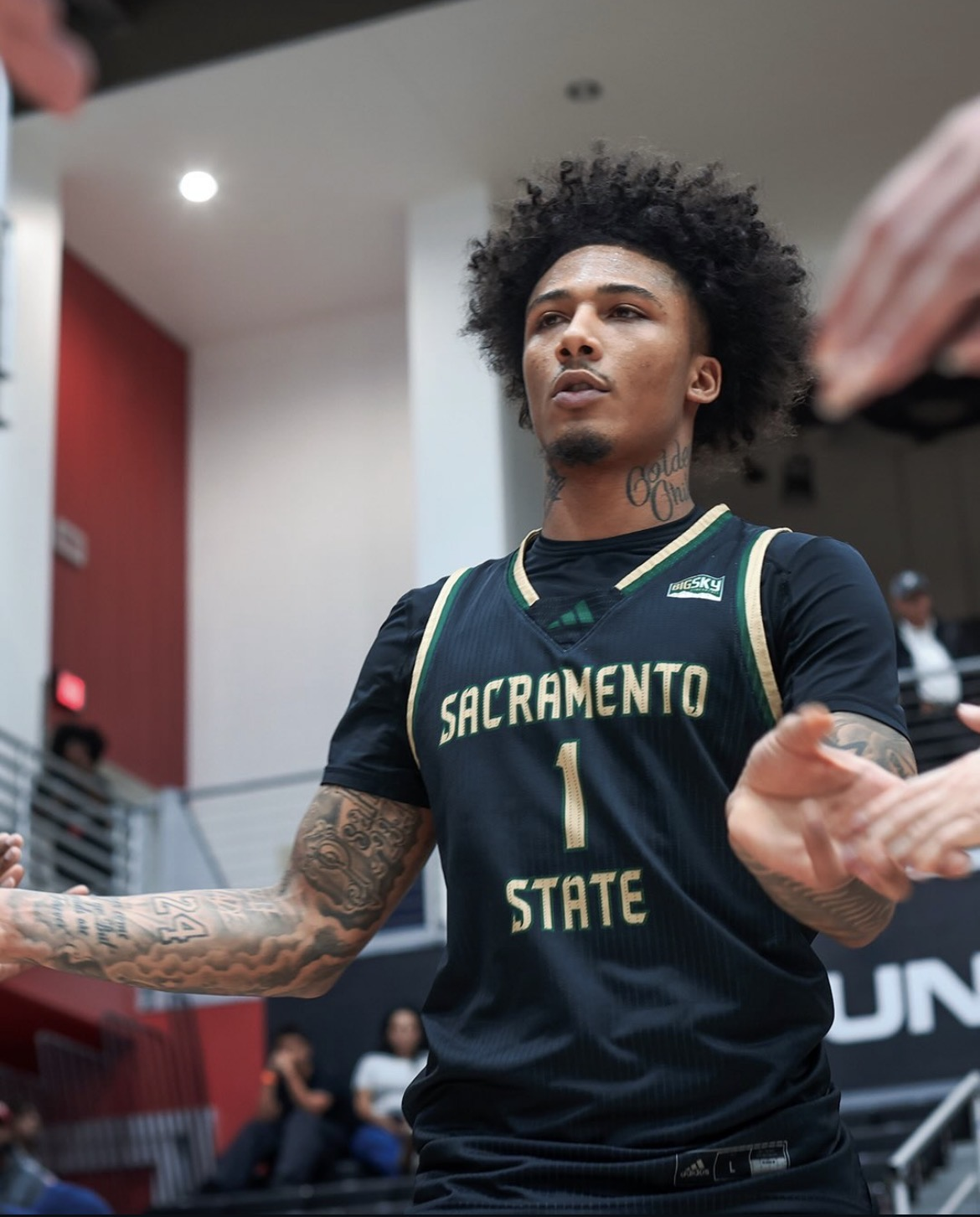
- Williams in 2025

No. 1 – Sacramento State Hornets
- Position: Shooting guard / point guard
- Conference: Big West Conference

Personal information
- Born: June 26, 2004 (age 22) San Diego, California, U.S.
- Listed height: 6 ft 3 in (1.91 m)
- Listed weight: 202 lb (92 kg)

Career information
- High school: San Ysidro (San Diego, California); Lake Norman Christian (Huntersville, North Carolina)
- College: UCF (2024–2025); Sacramento State (2025–present)

Michael Anthony Williams (born June 26, 2004) is an American college basketball player for the Sacramento State Hornets of the Big West Conference. He has previously played for the UCF Knights.

== Early life ==
Williams grew up playing under the guidance of his father and mother. In his childhood, he mainly played on an outdoor court in his apartment complex. In elementary school, Williams was often involved in fights with bullies. Yet this played as a key role in development for his mentality and play-style throughout the future of his basketball career. He worked as a ball boy for San Ysidro High School head coach Terry Tucker, who said that "he couldn't keep (Williams) out of the gym." In sixth grade while playing with the San Diego Sharks, Williams had his first official game dunk at 12 years old (April 15, 2017). He went on to play for the Malcolm Thomas All-Stars travel team. In seventh and eighth grades, he was ranked the number one player in the 2023 class by the Naismith National Youth All-American Report. In eighth grade, Williams joined the North Coast Blue Chips Amateur Athletic Union (AAU) team, where he rose to fame while playing alongside Bronny James. In 2019, he played for the Compton Magic on the AAU circuit.

== High school career ==
As a freshman, Williams played for San Ysidro High School in San Diego. On November 20, 2019, he made his high school debut, recording 46 points, five rebounds, four assists and four steals in a 98–46 win over El Cajon Valley High School. In his next game, an 85–77 victory over Mission Bay High School, Williams scored 50 points. On December 13, he scored a career-high 77 points, making nine three-pointers, in a 116–52 win over Kearny High School. He broke the CIF San Diego Section (CIF-SDS) single-game scoring record, previously held by Tyrone Shelley since 2005, and set the state freshman record for single-game scoring. On January 10, 2020, Williams recorded 35 points in a 103–71 loss to top 2020 recruit Evan Mobley and Rancho Christian School, one of the best high school teams in the country. He led San Ysidro to the CIF-SDS Division III title on February 27. As a freshman, Williams averaged 29.9 points, 6.7 rebounds and 4.9 assists per game and was named MaxPreps National Freshman of the Year.

Entering his sophomore season, Williams transferred to Lake Norman Christian School in Huntersville, North Carolina.

On April 9, 2022, Williams announced that he would return home to San Diego and play for his original high school, San Ysidro High School, for his senior year.

=== Recruiting ===
Williams was considered a four-star recruit in the 2023 class by 247Sports, ESPN and Rivals. He received offers from many NCAA Division I programs, including Arizona and Arizona State, before starting his high school career. In June 2020, Williams was offered basketball scholarships by several historically black colleges and universities (HBCU) after showing interest in playing for an HBCU on social media.

On November 5, 2022, Williams committed to play for the University of Memphis for head coach Penny Hardaway, starting in 2023–24.

College recruiting
Name	Hometown	School	Height	Weight	Commit date
Mikey Williams; PG	San Diego, CA	Lake Norman Christian (NC)	6 ft 1 in (1.85 m)	185 lb (84 kg)	—
Mikey Williams; PG	Recruit ratings: Rivals: 247Sports: ESPN: (86)				
Overall recruit ranking: Rivals: 71 247Sports: 52 ESPN: 49
Note: In many cases, Scout, Rivals, 247Sports, On3, and ESPN may conflict in their listings of height and weight.; In these cases, the average was taken. ESPN grades are on a 100-point scale.; Sources: "2023 Team Ranking". Rivals.

== College career ==
=== Memphis ===
On November 5, 2022, Williams committed to play for the University of Memphis for head coach Penny Hardaway, starting in 2023–24. However, he never joined the basketball team stemming from a criminal investigation in California, where Williams was facing gun charges after shooting at a car full of teens.

On January 8, 2024, Williams and fellow Memphis Tigers freshman JJ Taylor both entered the NCAA transfer portal mid-season.

=== UCF ===
On January 12, 2024, Williams announced he was transferring to the University of Central Florida (UCF). He averaged 5.1 points in 14 minutes per game over 18 games for UCF.

On March 24, 2025, Williams once again entered the transfer portal.

=== Sacramento State ===
On April 29, 2025, Williams announced his commitment to play for the Sacramento State Hornets.

== Personal life ==
Williams' father, Mahlon, played basketball for Sweetwater High School, where he was an All-CIF-SDS selection. His mother, Charisse, played softball for Kearny High School and Hampton University.

=== April 2023 arrest ===
On April 13, 2023, Williams was arrested in Jamul, California, on five charges of assault with a deadly weapon; he was released on $50,000 bail the following day. San Diego County Sheriff's Office's Lieutenant Gavin Lanning said Williams is likely to face only one charge, carrying a maximum sentence of up to four years in prison (minimum six months). On April 14, 2023, the University of Memphis released a statement saying, "We are aware of the situation and are gathering more information." On April 20, 2023, Williams pleaded not guilty to multiple charges of assault with a deadly weapon. Due to security concerns, his attorney said the court appearance was virtual. Williams is accused of violating California penal code Chapter 9, Section 245(a)(2), which involves "any person who commits an assault upon the person of another with a firearm." According to police, Williams fired a gun at a car full of people following an altercation at his residence. Each count can carry up to four years in prison. Williams was initially required to appear either in-person or virtually on June 29, 2023, for a preliminary hearing, but the hearing was subsequently rescheduled to July 12, 2023, after his legal team told a judge they needed more time after receiving additional information regarding the incident. On July 6, 2023, his hearing was postponed for a second time in less than a month, with a new hearing date scheduled for September 5, 2023.

On September 5, 2023, the hearing was postponed for a third time, until October 10, 2023. As a result of the hearing, Judge Sherry M. Thompson-Taylor ordered Williams to stand trial on six felony gun charges and scheduled his arraignment for October 24, 2023. Judge Thompson-Taylor denied the prosecution's request to increase Williams' bail to $500,000 and allowed Williams to remain free on a $50,000 bond. During his October 24 arraignment, three additional felony charges were filed against Williams: one count of assault with a weapon and two counts of making threats.

On November 30, 2023, Williams pled guilty to one charge. Williams was ordered to deal with his misdemeanor by taking classes.

=== Social media and endorsements ===
Williams has established a large social media following. He had over one million Instagram followers before starting high school. By the end of his freshman year of high school, he had almost 2 million followers on Instagram, including musician Drake and NBA players LeBron James and Kevin Durant. Williams had accumulated 3.2 million followers on Instagram by the end of his sophomore year in high school.

On July 22, 2021, Williams signed a contract with Excel Sports Management to pursue Name, Image and Likeness endorsement opportunities.

On October 28, 2021, Williams signed a multi-year endorsement deal with Puma, making him the first American high school basketball player to sign a sneaker deal with a global footwear company, at 17 years old. Puma ended Williams' endorsement deal as a result of his pending legal issues.
