= Ross Hodge =

American college basketball coach (born 1980)

Current position
- Title: Head coach
- Team: West Virginia
- Conference: Big 12
- Record: 25–16 (.610)

Biographical details
- Born: July 15, 1980 (age 46); Dallas, Texas, U.S.

Playing career
- 1999–2001: Paris JC
- 2001–2003: Texas A&M–Commerce

Coaching career (HC unless noted)
- 2003–2005: Texas A&M–Commerce (assistant)
- 2005–2006: Paris JC (assistant)
- 2006–2009: Paris JC
- 2009–2011: Midland
- 2011–2012: Southern Miss (assistant)
- 2012–2016: Colorado State (assistant)
- 2016–2017: Arkansas State (associate HC)
- 2017–2023: North Texas (associate HC)
- 2023–2025: North Texas
- 2025–present: West Virginia

Head coaching record
- Overall: 71–40 (.640) (college); 146–24 (.859) (NJCAA)
- Tournaments: 4–1 (NIT); 3–0 (CBC)

Accomplishments and honors

Championships
- Western Junior Athletics Conference Regular Season (2011); College Basketball Crown (2026)

Ross A. Hodge (born July 15, 1980) is an American college basketball coach, currently the head coach for the West Virginia Mountaineers men's basketball team.

== Playing career ==
Hodge played two years of college basketball at Paris Junior College before transferring to Texas A&M–Commerce.

== Coaching career ==
Following graduation, Hodge became an assistant coach at his alma mater, where he stayed for two seasons before accepting the head coaching position at his other former school, Paris Junior College. While at Paris, he led the Dragons to an 83–17 overall record and two Texas Eastern Athletic Conference regular-season championships as well as an eighth-place finish in the NJCAA National Tournament in 2008. Following his stint at Paris, Hodge moved to Midland College where he had a 63–7 overall record, guiding the team to national runner up in the NJCAA tournament in 2011.

In 2011, Hodge joined the staff at Southern Miss under Larry Eustachy for a single season. He'd follow Eustachy to Colorado State where he stayed from 2012 to 2016 before joining Grant McCasland's staff at Arkansas State, and subsequently following McCasland to North Texas in 2017.

On April 2, 2023, he was promoted to head coach at North Texas after McCasland accepted the head coaching position at Texas Tech.

On March 26, 2025, it was announced that he signed a 5-year deal with former North Texas Mean Green athletic director colleague Wren Baker to become the current head coach for the West Virginia Mountaineers men's basketball team.

== Head coaching record ==
=== NCAA DI ===
Record table
Season	Team	Overall	Conference	Standing	Postseason
North Texas Mean Green (American Athletic Conference) (2023–2025)
2023–24	North Texas	19–15	10–8	7th	NIT Second Round
2024–25	North Texas	27–9	14–4	2nd	NIT Semifinals
North Texas:		46–24 (.657)	24–12 (.667)		
West Virginia Mountaineers (Big 12 Conference) (2025–present)
2025–26	West Virginia	21–14	9–9	T–7th	CBC Champions
2026–27	West Virginia	4–2	0–0		
West Virginia:		25–16 (.610)	9–9 (.500)		
Total:		71–40 (.640)			
National champion Postseason invitational champion Conference regular season champion Conference regular season and conference tournament champion Division regular season champion Division regular season and conference tournament champion Conference tournament champion

=== NJCAA ===
Record table
Season	Team	Overall	Conference	Standing	Postseason
Paris Junior College (Region XIV) (2006–2009)
2006–07	Paris JC	26–4			
2007–08	Paris JC	30–7			NJCAA Division I Elite Eight
2008–09	Paris JC	25–6			
Paris JC:		83–17 (.830)			
Midland College (WJCAC) (2009–2011)
2009–10	Midland College	30–3			
2010–11	Midland College	31–4		1st	NJCAA Division I Runner Up
Midland College:		63–7 (.900)			
Total:		146–24 (.859)			
National champion Postseason invitational champion Conference regular season champion Conference regular season and conference tournament champion Division regular season champion Division regular season and conference tournament champion Conference tournament champion
