= 2019 CAA men's basketball tournament =

Basketball Tournament

- Tournament Logo
- Classification: Division I
- Season: 2018–19
- Teams: 10
- Site: North Charleston Coliseum; North Charleston, South Carolina
- Champions: Northeastern (2nd title)
- Winning coach: Bill Coen (2nd title)
- MVP: Vasa Pusica (Northeastern)
- Top scorer: Justin Wright-Foreman (Hofstra) (88 points)
- Television: CAA.tv, CBSSN

2018–19 CAA men's basketball standings
	Conf.				Overall
Team	W		L	PCT	W		L	PCT
Hofstra	15	–	3	.833	27	–	8	.771
Northeastern †	14	–	4	.778	23	–	11	.676
Charleston	12	–	6	.667	24	–	9	.727
William & Mary	10	–	8	.556	14	–	17	.452
Delaware	8	–	10	.444	17	–	16	.515
Drexel	7	–	11	.389	13	–	19	.406
Elon	7	–	11	.389	11	–	21	.344
James Madison	6	–	12	.333	14	–	19	.424
Towson	6	–	12	.333	10	–	22	.313
UNC Wilmington	5	–	13	.278	10	–	23	.303
† 2019 CAA tournament winner

The 2019 Colonial Athletic Association men's basketball tournament was the postseason men's basketball tournament for the Colonial Athletic Association for the 2018–19 NCAA Division I men's basketball season. The tournament was held March 9–12, 2019 at the North Charleston Coliseum in North Charleston, South Carolina. Northeastern defeated Hofstra 82–74 in the championship game and received the CAA's automatic bid to the NCAA tournament. It was the second title for Northeastern in the CAA, the last coming in 2015.

== Seeds ==
All 10 CAA teams participated in the tournament. Teams were seeded by conference record, with a tiebreaker system used to seed teams with identical conference records. The top six teams received a bye to the quarterfinals.

Seed	School	Conf.	Tiebreaker 1	Tiebreaker 2
1	Hofstra	15–3		
2	Northeastern	14–4		
3	Charleston	12–6		
4	William & Mary	10–8		
5	Delaware	8–10		
6	Drexel	7–11	2–0 vs Elon	
7	Elon	7–11	0–2 vs Drexel	
8	James Madison	6–12	1–1 vs Towson	1–1 vs Hofstra
9	Towson	6–12	1–1 vs James Madison	0–2 vs Hofstra
10	UNC Wilmington	5–13		

== Schedule ==
Session	Game	Time*	Matchup	Score	Television
First round – Saturday March 9, 2019
1	1	4:00 pm	No. 9 Towson vs No. 8 James Madison	73–74	CAA.tv
1	2	6:30 pm	No. 10 UNC Wilmington vs No. 7 Elon	93–86	CAA.tv
Quarterfinals – Sunday March 10, 2019
2	3	12:00 pm	No. 8 James Madison vs No. 1 Hofstra	67–76	CAA.tv
2	4	2:30 pm	No. 5 Delaware vs No. 4 William & Mary	85–79	CAA.tv
3	5	6:00 pm	No. 10 UNC Wilmington vs No. 2 Northeastern	59–80	CAA.tv
3	6	8:30 pm	No. 6 Drexel vs No. 3 Charleston	61–73	CAA.tv
Semifinals – Monday March 11, 2019
4	7	6:00 pm	No. 1 Hofstra vs No. 5 Delaware	78–74^{OT}	CBSSN
4	8	8:30 pm	No. 2 Northeastern vs No. 3 Charleston	70–67	CBSSN
Championship – Tuesday March 12, 2019
5	9	7:00 pm	No. 1 Hofstra vs No. 2 Northeastern	74–82	CBSSN
*Game times in ET. Rankings denote tournament seed

== Bracket ==
First round Saturday, March 9 CAA.tv
8	James Madison	74
9	Towson	73
7	Elon	86
10	UNC Wilmington	93

Quarterfinals; Sunday, March 10; CAA.tv
1	Hofstra	76
8	James Madison	67
4	William & Mary	79
5	Delaware	85
2	Northeastern	80
10	UNC Wilmington	59
3	Charleston	73
6	Drexel	61

Semifinals; Monday, March 11; CBS Sports Network
1	Hofstra	78*
5	Delaware	74
2	Northeastern	70
3	Charleston	67

Championship; Tuesday, March 12; CBS Sports Network
1	Hofstra	74
2	Northeastern	82

* denotes overtime game

== Game summaries ==
=== First round ===
CAA.tv

March 9, 2019
4:00 pm

Recap

No. 9 Towson 73, No. 8 James Madison 74
Scoring by half: 31–34, 42–40
Pts: Fobbs – 18; Rebs: Tunstall – 10; Asts: 4 tied – 2 Betrand – 10 Pts	Pts: 2 tied – 26; Rebs: Wilson – 7 Asts: Lewis – 3 Parker – 7 Pts

North Charleston Coliseum
North Charleston, SC
Attendance: 2,578
Referees: Matt Lavigne, Anthony Franklin, Jeff Pon

CAA.tv

March 9, 2019
6:30 pm

Recap

No. 10 UNC Wilmington 93, No. 7 Elon 86
Scoring by half: 46–38, 47–48
Pts: Cylla – 23; Rebs: Cacok – 12; Asts: Toews – 6 Cacok – 16 Pts, 3 Blks	Pts: Santa Ana – 26; Rebs: 2 tied – 7 Asts: Santa Ana – 3 Seibring – 14 Pts, 7 Rebs

North Charleston Coliseum
North Charleston, SC
Attendance: 2,578
Referees: Keith Fogelman, Nick Heater, Brian Zink

=== Quarterfinals ===
CAA.tv

March 10, 2019
12:00 pm

Recap

No. 8 James Madison 67, No. 1 Hofstra 76
Scoring by half: 30–37, 37–39
Pts: Lewis – 23; Rebs: Banks – 12; Asts: Lewis – 4 Banks – 15 Pts, 3 Stls	Pts: Wright-Foreman – 17; Rebs: Taylor – 11; Asts: Wright-Foreman – 4 Taylor – 16 Pts, 5 Blks

North Charleston Coliseum
North Charleston, SC
Referees: Mike Stephens, AJ Desai, Tony Chiazza

CAA.tv

March 10, 2019
2:30 pm

Recap

No. 5 Delaware 85, No. 4 William & Mary 79
Scoring by half: 31–45, 54–34
Pts: Horton – 26; Rebs: Carter – 10; Asts: Anderson – 7 Allen – 23 Pts, 4 Asts	Pts: Pierce – 26; Rebs: Knight – 11; Asts: Knight – 7 Knight – 21 Pts, 4 Blks

North Charleston Coliseum
North Charleston, SC
Attendance: 2,796
Referees: Roger Ayers, Brian Dorsey, Bert Smith

CAA.tv

March 10, 2019
6:00 pm

Recap

No. 10 UNC Wilmington 59, No. 2 Northeastern 80
Scoring by half: 28–39, 31–41
Pts: Cacok – 21; Rebs: Cacok – 13; Asts: Toews – 4 Cylla – 12 Pts, 5 Rebs	Pts: Roland – 21; Rebs: Brace – 8 Asts: Pusica – 7 Pusica – 16 Pts, 6 Rebs

North Charleston Coliseum
North Charleston, SC
Referees: Jeff Anderson, Matt Potter, Tony Henderson

CAA.tv

March 10, 2019
8:30 pm

Recap

No. 6 Drexel 61, No. 3 Charleston 73
Scoring by half: 24–38, 37–35
Pts: Butler – 14; Rebs: Butler – 9 Asts: Wynter – 6 Wynter – 12 Pts, 8 Rebs	Pts: Riller – 24; Rebs: 2 tied – 7 Asts: Riller – 6 Brantley – 16 Pts, 3 Asts

North Charleston Coliseum
North Charleston, SC
Attendance: 4,040
Referees: Jamie Luckie, Brent Hampton, Lamar Simpson

=== Semifinals ===
CBSSN

March 11, 2019
6:00 pm

Recap

No. 1 Hofstra 78, No. 5 Delaware 74 (OT)
Scoring by half: 38–25, 29–42 Overtime: 11–7
Pts: Wright-Foreman – 42; Rebs: 2 tied – 6 Asts: Buie – 4 Coburn – 13 Pts, 2 Rebs	Pts: Horton – 21; Rebs: Anderson – 6 Asts: Horton – 4 Anderson – 17 Pts, 4 Stls

North Charleston Coliseum
North Charleston, SC
Referees: Pat Driscoll, Brian O'Connell, John Gaffney

CBSSN

March 11, 2019
8:30 pm

Recap

No. 2 Northeastern 70, No. 3 Charleston 67
Scoring by half: 35–33, 35–34
Pts: Occeus – 17; Rebs: Green – 6 Asts: Pusica – 7 Pusica – 13 Pts, 5 Rebs	Pts: Brantley – 18; Rebs: Brantley – 10; Asts: Brantley – 5 Riller – 10 Pts, 4 Rebs

North Charleston Coliseum
North Charleston, SC
Attendance: 3,599
Referees: James Breeding, Jeff Clark, Tim Clougherty

=== Championship ===
CBSSN

March 12, 2019
7:00 pm

Recap

No. 1 Hofstra 74, No. 2 Northeastern 82
Scoring by half: 26–42, 48–40
Pts: Wright-Foreman – 29; Rebs: Taylor – 15; Asts: 2 tied – 3 Pemberton – 15 Pts, 7 Rebs	Pts: Pusica – 21; Rebs: Brace – 10; Asts: Brace – 9 Occeus – 11 Pts, 4 Stls

North Charleston Coliseum
North Charleston, SC
Attendance: 2,892
Referees: Ron Groover, Raymond Styons, Bill Covington

== Team and tournament leaders ==
=== Team leaders ===
Team	Points		Rebounds		Assists		Steals		Blocks		Minutes	
College of Charleston	2 tied	34	Brantley	17	Riller	10	2 tied	4	Brantley	2	Riller	72
Delaware	Horton	47	Carter	15	Anderson	10	Anderson	4	Bryant	1	Horton	82
Drexel	Butler	14	Butler	9	Wynter	6	Juric	5	2 tied	2	Wynter	40
Elon	Santa Ana	26	2 tied	7	Santa Ana	3	Seibring	4	Seibring	2	Seibring	35
Hofstra	Wright-Foreman	88	Taylor	32	Buie	10	3 tied	4	Taylor	10	Wright-Foreman	122
James Madison	Lewis	49	Wilson	15	Lewis	7	2 tied	5	Lewis	1	Lewis	76
Northeastern	Pusica	50	Brace	23	Pusica	15	Occeus	7	Pusica	2	Gresham	99
Towson	Fobbs	18	Tunstall	10	4 tied	2	5 tied	1	Tunstall	2	Fobbs	36
UNC Wilmington	Cacok	37	Cacok	25	Toews	10	Gadsden	3	Cacok	4	Toews	64
William & Mary	Pierce	26	Knight	11	Knight	7	2 tied	2	Knight	4	Pierce	38

== See also ==
- 2019 CAA women's basketball tournament
