= 2018–19 Northeastern Huskies men's basketball team =

American college basketball season

2018–19 Northeastern Huskies men's basketball

CAA tournament champions

NCAA tournament, first round
- Conference: Colonial Athletic Association
- Record: 23–11 (14–4 CAA)
- Head coach: Bill Coen (13th season)
- Assistant coaches: Chris Markwood; Brian McDonald; Manny Adako
- Home arena: Matthews Arena

2018–19 CAA men's basketball standings
| | Conf. | | | | Overall |
| Team | W | | L | PCT | W | | L | PCT |
|---|---|---|---|---|---|---|---|---|
| Hofstra | 15 | – | 3 | .833 | 27 | – | 8 | .771 |
| Northeastern † | 14 | – | 4 | .778 | 23 | – | 11 | .676 |
| Charleston | 12 | – | 6 | .667 | 24 | – | 9 | .727 |
| William & Mary | 10 | – | 8 | .556 | 14 | – | 17 | .452 |
| Delaware | 8 | – | 10 | .444 | 17 | – | 16 | .515 |
| Drexel | 7 | – | 11 | .389 | 13 | – | 19 | .406 |
| Elon | 7 | – | 11 | .389 | 11 | – | 21 | .344 |
| James Madison | 6 | – | 12 | .333 | 14 | – | 19 | .424 |
| Towson | 6 | – | 12 | .333 | 10 | – | 22 | .313 |
| UNC Wilmington | 5 | – | 13 | .278 | 10 | – | 23 | .303 |
† 2019 CAA tournament winner

The 2018–19 Northeastern Huskies men's basketball team represented Northeastern University during the 2018–19 NCAA Division I men's basketball season. The Huskies, led by 13th-year head coach Bill Coen, played their home games at Matthews Arena in Boston, Massachusetts as members of the Colonial Athletic Association (CAA). They finished the season 23–11, 14–4 in CAA play, to finish in second place. In the CAA tournament, they defeated UNC Wilmington, College of Charleston and Hofstra to win the CAA tournament. As a result, they received an automatic bid to the NCAA tournament, where they lost in the first round to Kansas.

== Previous season ==
The Huskies finished the 2017–18 season 23–10, 14–4 in CAA play, to win a share of the regular-season title with College of Charleston. They defeated Delaware and UNC Wilmington to advance to the championship game of the CAA tournament, where they lost to College of Charleston. Despite having 23 wins, they did not participate in a postseason tournament.

== Offseason ==
=== Departures ===
| Name | Number | Pos. | Height | Weight | Year | Hometown | Reason for departure |
|---|---|---|---|---|---|---|---|
| Derrick Cook | 0 | G | 6' 4" | 190 | Freshman | Fairburn, GA | Transferred to Georgia Highlands College |
| Devon Begley | 20 | G | 6' 4" | 198 | Senior | Pearland, TX | Graduated |

=== Incoming transfers ===
| Name | Number | Pos. | Height | Weight | Year | Hometown | Previous school |
|---|---|---|---|---|---|---|---|
| Greg Eboigbodin | 10 | F | 6' 9" | 220 | Sophomore | Benin City, Nigeria | Illinois |
| Shaquille Walters | 24 | G/F | 6' 6" | 190 | Sophomore | London, England | Santa Clara |

Under NCAA transfer rules, Walters and Eboigbodin had to sit out for the 2018–19 season, and had three years of remaining eligibility.

=== Recruiting ===
There was no recruiting class of 2018 for Northeastern.

=== Recruiting class of 2019 ===
College recruiting (2019)
| Name | Hometown | School | Height | Weight | Commit date |
|---|---|---|---|---|---|
| Tyson Walker; PG | Brooklyn, NY | New Hampton High School | 6 ft 0 in (1.83 m) | 150 lb (68 kg) | Oct 7, 2018 |
| Tyson Walker; PG | Recruit ratings: Scout: Rivals: 247Sports: ESPN: (0) | | | | |
Overall recruit ranking:
Note: In many cases, Scout, Rivals, 247Sports, On3, and ESPN may conflict in their listings of height and weight.; In these cases, the average was taken. ESPN grades are on a 100-point scale.; Sources: "2019 Team Ranking". Rivals.

== Roster ==
2018–19 Northeastern Huskies men's basketball team
Players
Coaches

| Pos. | # | Name | Height | Weight | Year | Previous school | Hometown |
|---|---|---|---|---|---|---|---|
| F | 00 | Jason Strong | 6 ft 8 in (2.03 m) | 217 lb (98 kg) | RS Fr | Westminster Academy | Coconut Creek, FL |
| G | 1 | Shawn Occeus | 6 ft 4 in (1.93 m) | 208 lb (94 kg) | Jr | Grandview Prep | Boynton Beach, FL |
| G | 4 | Vasa Pusica | 6 ft 5 in (1.96 m) | 210 lb (95 kg) | RS Sr | Sunrise Christian Academy; San Diego | Belgrade, Serbia |
| F | 10 | Greg Eboigbodin (redshirt) | 6 ft 9 in (2.06 m) | 225 lb (102 kg) | So | University of Detroit Jesuit HS; Illinois | Benin City, Nigeria |
| F | 11 | Jeremy Miller | 6 ft 10 in (2.08 m) | 225 lb (102 kg) | Sr | New Hampton School | Milton, MA |
| G | 12 | Jordan Roland | 6 ft 1 in (1.85 m) | 171 lb (78 kg) | RS Jr | Westhill HS; George Washington | Syracuse, NY |
| G | 13 | Myles Franklin | 6 ft 4 in (1.93 m) | 170 lb (77 kg) | So | Villa Park | Brea, CA |
| G/F | 14 | Maxime Boursiquot | 6 ft 5 in (1.96 m) | 211 lb (96 kg) | Jr | Immaculata | Ottawa, ON |
| G | 20 | Bolden Brace | 6 ft 8 in (2.03 m) | 227 lb (103 kg) | Jr | Santa Barbara HS | Santa Barbara, CA |
| G | 22 | Donnell Jr. Gresham | 6 ft 1 in (1.85 m) | 203 lb (92 kg) | RS Jr | Cretin-Derham Hall | Maplewood, MN |
| G/F | 24 | Shaquille Walters (redshirt) | 6 ft 6 in (1.98 m) | 190 lb (86 kg) | So | City of London Academy/Lee Academy; Santa Clara | London, England |
| C | 30 | Anthony Green | 6 ft 10 in (2.08 m) | 252 lb (114 kg) | Sr | North Quincy HS; Tilton School | Quincy, MA |
| F | 33 | Tomas Murphy | 6 ft 8 in (2.03 m) | 220 lb (100 kg) | So | Northfield Mount Hermon School | Wakefield, RI |

Head coach

- Bill Coen (Hamilton College (NY))

Assistant coach(es)

- Chris Markwood (Maine)
- Brian McDonald (Northeastern)
- Manny Adako (Northeastern)

Legend

- (C) Team captain
- (S) Suspended
- (I) Ineligible
- (W) Walk-on
- Injured
- Current redshirt

Roster
Last update: February 27, 2025

== Schedule and results ==
| Date time, TV | Rank^{#} | Opponent^{#} | Result | Record | Site (attendance) city, state |
Non-conference regular season
| November 6, 2018*; 8:00 p.m. | | Boston University | L 74–77 | 0–1 | Matthews Arena (1,180); Boston, MA |
| November 9, 2018*; 7:00 p.m. | | at Harvard | W 81–71 | 1–1 | Lavietes Pavilion (1,481); Cambridge, MA |
| November 15, 2018*; 2:00 p.m., ESPNU | | vs. Alabama; Charleston Classic quarterfinals | W 68–52 | 2–1 | TD Arena (2,648); Charleston, SC |
| November 16, 2018*; 8:30 p.m., ESPN2 | | vs. No. 16 Virginia Tech; Charleston Classic semifinals | L 60–88 | 2–2 | TD Arena (2,752); Charleston, SC |
| November 18, 2018*; 6:00 p.m., ESPNU | | vs. Davidson; Charleston Classic 3rd-place game | L 59–71 | 2–3 | TD Arena (3,985); Charleston, SC |
| November 24, 2018*; 1:00 p.m. | | at Davidson | L 69–78 | 2–4 | John M. Belk Arena (3,885); Davidson, NC |
| November 28, 2018*; 7:00 p.m. | | at Bucknell | W 96–78 | 3–4 | Sojka Pavilion (2,121); Lewisburg, PA |
| December 1, 2018*; 3:00 p.m. | | Eastern Michigan | W 81–67 | 4–4 | Matthews Arena (1,147); Boston, MA |
| December 4, 2018*; 7:00 p.m., ACCNX | | at Syracuse | L 49–72 | 4–5 | Carrier Dome (20,416); Syracuse, NY |
| December 8, 2018*; 4:00 p.m. | | Oakland | W 92–83 | 5–5 | Matthews Arena (763); Boston, MA |
| December 16, 2018*; 2:00 p.m. | | at Vermont | L 70–75 | 5–6 | Patrick Gym (2,629); Burlington, VT |
| December 21, 2018*; 12:00 p.m. | | St. Bonaventure | W 64–59 | 6–6 | Matthews Arena (2,348); Boston, MA |
CAA regular season
| December 28, 2018; 7:00 p.m. | | Drexel | W 93–83 | 7–6 (1–0) | Matthews Arena (845); Boston, MA |
| December 30, 2018; 4:00 p.m. | | Delaware | L 80–82 ^{2OT} | 7–7 (1–1) | Matthews Arena (760); Boston, MA |
| January 5, 2019; 4:00 p.m. | | at Hofstra | L 72–75 | 7–8 (1–2) | Mack Sports Complex (1,618); Hempstead, NY |
| January 10, 2019; 7:00 p.m. | | at Elon | W 81–70 ^{OT} | 8–8 (2–2) | Schar Center (1,497); Elon, NC |
| January 12, 2019; 4:00 p.m. | | at William & Mary | W 90–70 | 9–8 (3–2) | Kaplan Arena (3,367); Williamsburg, VA |
| January 17, 2019; 7:00 p.m. | | College of Charleston | W 69–60 | 10–8 (4–2) | Matthews Arena (1,074); Boston, MA |
| January 19, 2019; 4:00 p.m. | | UNC Wilmington | W 88–71 | 11–8 (5–2) | Matthews Arena (800); Boston, MA |
| January 24, 2019; 7:00 p.m. | | at Towson | L 72–75 | 11–9 (5–3) | SECU Arena (1,023); Towson, MD |
| January 26, 2019; 4:00 p.m. | | at James Madison | W 78–68 | 12–9 (6–3) | JMU Convocation Center (2,728); Harrisonburg, VA |
| February 2, 2019; 4:30 p.m. | | Hofstra | W 75–61 | 13–9 (7–3) | Matthews Arena (1,208); Boston, MA |
| February 7, 2019; 4:00 p.m. | | William & Mary | W 72–60 | 14–9 (8–3) | Matthews Arena (795); Boston, MA |
| February 9, 2019; 4:00 p.m. | | Elon | W 72–60 ^{OT} | 15–9 (9–3) | Matthews Arena (1,264); Boston, MA |
| February 14, 2019; 7:00 p.m. | | at UNC Wilmington | W 81–77 | 16–9 (10–3) | Trask Coliseum (3,842); Wilmington, NC |
| February 16, 2019; 4:00 p.m. | | at College of Charleston | L 79–88 ^{OT} | 16–10 (10–4) | TD Arena (4,867); Charleston, SC |
| February 21, 2019; 7:00 p.m. | | James Madison | W 76–60 | 17–10 (11–4) | Matthews Arena (910); Boston, MA |
| February 23, 2019; 12:30 p.m. | | Towson | W 73–58 | 18–10 (12–4) | Matthews Arena (1,432); Boston, MA |
| February 28, 2019; 7:00 p.m. | | at Delaware | W 75–64 | 19–10 (13–4) | Bob Carpenter Center (2,157); Newark, DE |
| March 2, 2019; 4:00 p.m. | | at Drexel | W 90–66 | 20–10 (14–4) | Daskalakis Athletic Center (1,348); Philadelphia, PA |
CAA tournament
| March 10, 2019; 6:00 p.m. | (2) | vs. (10) UNC Wilmington; Quarterfinals | W 80–59 | 21–10 | North Charleston Coliseum; North Charleston, SC |
| March 11, 2019; 8:53 p.m., CBSSN | (2) | vs. (3) Charleston; Semifinals | W 70–67 | 22–10 | North Charleston Coliseum (3,599); North Charleston, SC |
| March 12, 2019; 7:00 p.m., CBSSN | (2) | vs. (1) Hofstra; Championship | W 82–74 | 23–10 | North Charleston Coliseum (2,892); North Charleston, SC |
NCAA tournament
| March 21, 2019*; 4:00 p.m., TNT | (13 MW) | vs. (4 MW) No. 17 Kansas; First round | L 53–87 | 23–11 | Vivint Smart Home Arena (16,576); Salt Lake City, UT |
*Non-conference game. ^{#}Rankings from AP poll. (#) Tournament seedings in parentheses. All times are in Eastern.
