= 2018–19 James Madison Dukes men's basketball team =

American college basketball season

2018–19 James Madison Dukes men's basketball
- Conference: Colonial Athletic Association
- Record: 14–19 (6–12 CAA)
- Head coach: Louis Rowe (3rd season)
- Assistant coaches: Byron Taylor; Rob Summers; Tim Johnson
- Home arena: JMU Convocation Center

2018–19 CAA men's basketball standings
	Conf.				Overall
Team	W		L	PCT	W		L	PCT
Hofstra	15	–	3	.833	27	–	8	.771
Northeastern †	14	–	4	.778	23	–	11	.676
Charleston	12	–	6	.667	24	–	9	.727
William & Mary	10	–	8	.556	14	–	17	.452
Delaware	8	–	10	.444	17	–	16	.515
Drexel	7	–	11	.389	13	–	19	.406
Elon	7	–	11	.389	11	–	21	.344
James Madison	6	–	12	.333	14	–	19	.424
Towson	6	–	12	.333	10	–	22	.313
UNC Wilmington	5	–	13	.278	10	–	23	.303
† 2019 CAA tournament winner

The 2018–19 James Madison Dukes men's basketball team represented James Madison University during the 2018–19 NCAA Division I men's basketball season. The Dukes, led by third-year head coach Louis Rowe, played their home games at the James Madison University Convocation Center in Harrisonburg, Virginia as members of the Colonial Athletic Association.

== Previous season ==
The Dukes finished the 2017–18 season 10–22, 6–12 in CAA play to finish in a four-way tie for seventh place. They lost in the first round of the CAA tournament to Drexel.

== Departures ==
Name	Number	Pos.	Height	Weight	Year	Hometown	Reason for departure
Joey McLean	4	G	6'0"	150	Senior	Greensboro, NC	Graduated
Gerron Scissum	22	F	6'8"	205	RS Sophomore	Huntsville, AL	Transferred to Alabama A&M
Ramone Snowden	23	F	6'6"	230	RS Senior	Virginia Beach, VA	Graduated

== Recruiting ==
College recruiting information
Name	Hometown	School	Height	Weight	Commit date
DeShon Parker; PG	Dayton, OH	Wayne High School	6 ft 3 in (1.91 m)	180 lb (82 kg)	Jun 29, 2017
DeShon Parker; PG	Recruit ratings: Scout: Rivals: 247Sports: ESPN: (NR)				
Jonathan Hicklin; SG	Charlotte, NC	Northside Christian Academy	6 ft 4 in (1.93 m)	205 lb (93 kg)	Mar 18, 2018
Jonathan Hicklin; SG	Recruit ratings: Scout: Rivals: 247Sports: ESPN: (NR)				
Matthew Urbach; SG	Fairfax, VA	Wilbert Tucker Woodson High School	6 ft 4 in (1.93 m)	N/A	Oct 27, 2017
Matthew Urbach; SG	Recruit ratings: Scout: Rivals: 247Sports: ESPN: (NR)				
Devon Flowers; PF	McLean, VA	The Potomac School	6 ft 9 in (2.06 m)	200 lb (91 kg)	Apr 25, 2018
Devon Flowers; PF	Recruit ratings: Scout: Rivals: 247Sports: ESPN: (NR)				
Overall recruit ranking:
Note: In many cases, Scout, Rivals, 247Sports, On3, and ESPN may conflict in their listings of height and weight.; In these cases, the average was taken. ESPN grades are on a 100-point scale.; Sources: "2018 Team Ranking". Rivals.

=== Recruiting class of 2019 ===
College recruiting information (2019)
Name	Hometown	School	Height	Weight	Commit date
Quinn Richey; SG	Johns Creek, GA	Mount Pisgah Christian	6 ft 5 in (1.96 m)	187 lb (85 kg)	Sep 23, 2018
Quinn Richey; SG	Recruit ratings: Scout: Rivals: 247Sports: ESPN: (NR)				
Mike Fowler; PF	Raleigh, NC	Greensboro Day School	6 ft 9 in (2.06 m)	220 lb (100 kg)	Sep 23, 2018
Mike Fowler; PF	Recruit ratings: Scout: Rivals: 247Sports: ESPN: (NR)				
Julien Wooden; PF	Roanoke, VA	Northside High School	6 ft 8 in (2.03 m)	210 lb (95 kg)	Sep 28, 2018
Julien Wooden; PF	Recruit ratings: Scout: Rivals: 247Sports: ESPN: (NR)				
Overall recruit ranking:
Note: In many cases, Scout, Rivals, 247Sports, On3, and ESPN may conflict in their listings of height and weight.; In these cases, the average was taken. ESPN grades are on a 100-point scale.; Sources: "2019 Team Ranking". Rivals.

== Roster ==
2018–19 James Madison Dukes men's basketball team
Players
Coaches
}

Pos.	#	Name	Height	Weight	Year	Previous school	Hometown
G	1	Matt Lewis	6 ft 5 in (1.96 m)	180 lb (82 kg)	So	Bishop O'Connell HS	Woodbridge, Virginia
G	2	Antanee Pinkard	6 ft 4 in (1.93 m)	195 lb (88 kg)	Jr	Hill College	Lancaster, Pennsylvania
G	3	Stuckey Mosley	6 ft 3 in (1.91 m)	190 lb (86 kg)	RS Sr	Toledo	Orlando, Florida
G	4	Matthew Urbach	6 ft 5 in (1.96 m)	180 lb (82 kg)	Fr	W.T. Woodson HS	Fairfax, Virginia
G	5	Darius Banks	6 ft 5 in (1.96 m)	225 lb (102 kg)	So	St. Petersburg HS	St. Petersburg, Florida
F	10	Greg Jones	6 ft 7 in (2.01 m)	220 lb (100 kg)	So	John Marshall HS	Richmond, Virginia
F	11	Zach Jacobs	6 ft 8 in (2.03 m)	220 lb (100 kg)	So	Trinity Episcopal	Richmond, Virginia
F	12	Develle Phillips	6 ft 9 in (2.06 m)	210 lb (95 kg)	Sr	Odessa College	Bowie, Maryland
G	15	Jonathan Hicklin	6 ft 4 in (1.93 m)	205 lb (93 kg)	Fr	Northside Christian Academy	Charlotte, North Carolina
F	21	Cameron Smith	6 ft 7 in (2.01 m)	210 lb (95 kg)	RS Sr	Florida International	Tallahassee, Florida
G	23	Deshon Parker	6 ft 3 in (1.91 m)	180 lb (82 kg)	Fr	Wayne HS	Huber Heights, Ohio
F	24	Dwight Wilson	6 ft 7 in (2.01 m)	260 lb (118 kg)	So	Lincoln HS	Tallahassee, Florida
F	33	Alex Schulz (W)	6 ft 11 in (2.11 m)	265 lb (120 kg)	So	Oakton HS	Herndon, Virginia
F	35	Devon Flowers	6 ft 8 in (2.03 m)	210 lb (95 kg)	Fr	Potomac School	Hyattsville, Maryland

Head coach

- Louis Rowe (James Madison)

Assistant coach(es)

- Byron Taylor (Florida A&M)
- Rob Summers (West Virginia)
- Tim Johnson (Wofford)

Legend

- (C) Team captain
- (S) Suspended
- (I) Ineligible
- (W) Walk-on
- Injured
- Current redshirt

Roster

== Honors and awards ==
=== Lindy's Sports Preseason All Conference 2nd Team ===
- Stuckey Mosley

=== Athlon Sports Preseason All CAA 2nd Team ===
- Stuckey Mosley

== Schedule and results ==
Date time, TV	Rank^{#}	Opponent^{#}	Result	Record	Site (attendance) city, state
Non-conference regular season
November 6, 2018*; 7:00 pm		Eastern Mennonite	W 86–58	1–0	JMU Convocation Center (2,623); Harrisonburg, VA
November 9, 2018*; 7:45 pm, ESPN3		at East Carolina	W 73–72	2–0	Williams Arena at Minges Coliseum (3,918); Greenville, NC
November 12, 2018*; 7:00 pm		Bridgewater; Men Against Breast Cancer Hoops Challenge	W 82–59	3–0	JMU Convocation Center (2,185); Harrisonburg, VA
November 16, 2018*; 7:30 pm		at Charlotte	W 64–59	4–0	Dale F. Halton Arena (4,375); Charlotte, NC
November 20, 2018*; 7:00 pm		The Citadel	L 82–91 ^{OT}	4–1	JMU Convocation Center (1,982); Harrisonburg, VA
November 23, 2018*; 2:30 pm		at Oakland; Men Against Breast Cancer Hoops Challenge	L 69–77	4–2	Athletics Center O'rena (1,821); Rochester, MI
November 24, 2018*; 12:00 pm		vs. Northern Illinois; Men Against Breast Cancer Hoops Challenge	W 78–74	5–2	Athletics Center O'rena (1,610); Rochester, MI
November 25, 2018*; 12:00 pm		vs. Oral Roberts; Men Against Breast Cancer Hoops Challenge	L 69–78	5–3	Athletics Center O'rena (2,093); Rochester, MI
November 29, 2018*; 7:00 pm		Coppin State	W 81–71 ^{OT}	6–3	JMU Convocation Center (2,314); Harrisonburg, VA
December 1, 2018*; 7:00 pm		at Old Dominion; Rivalry	L 42–67	6–4	Ted Constant Convocation Center (6,982); Norfolk, VA
December 4, 2018*; 7:00 pm		Radford	W 73–66	7–4	JMU Convocation Center (2,482); Harrisonburg, VA
December 7, 2018*; 7:00 pm		at George Mason; A10–CAA Challenge	L 53–66	7–5	EagleBank Arena (5,065); Fairfax, VA
December 20, 2018*; 7:00 pm		at Fordham	L 48–75	7–6	Rose Hill Gymnasium (1,606); Bronx, NY
CAA regular season
December 28, 2018; 7:00 pm		at William & Mary	L 74–79	7–7 (0–1)	Kaplan Arena (3,690); Williamsburg, VA
December 30, 2018; 4:00 pm		at Elon	L 65–68	7–8 (0–2)	Schar Center (1,607); Elon, NC
January 3, 2019; 7:00 pm		UNC Wilmington	L 83–86	7–9 (0–3)	JMU Convocation Center (1,922); Harrisonburg, VA
January 5, 2019; 7:00 pm		College of Charleston	W 69–58	8–9 (1–3)	JMU Convocation Center (2,224); Harrisonburg, VA
January 12, 2019; 4:00 pm		Towson	W 74–65	9–9 (2–3)	JMU Convocation Center (2,559); Harrisonburg, VA
January 17, 2019; 7:00 pm		at Delaware	L 69–76	9–10 (2–4)	Bob Carpenter Center (1,741); Newark, DE
January 19, 2019; 2:00 pm		at Drexel	L 68–73	9–11 (2–5)	Daskalakis Athletic Center (2,119); Philadelphia, PA
January 24, 2019; 7:00 pm		Hofstra	L 68–85	9–12 (2–6)	JMU Convocation Center (2,109); Harrisonburg, VA
January 26, 2019; 4:00 pm		Northeastern	L 68–78	9–13 (2–7)	JMU Convocation Center (2,728); Harrisonburg, VA
January 31, 2019; 7:00 pm		at College of Charleston	L 53-70	9-14 (2-8)	TD Arena (3,933); Charleston, SC
February 2, 2019; 7:00 pm		at UNC Wilmington	W 104-95	10-14 (3-8)	Trask Coliseum (4,841); Wilmington, NC
February 9, 2019; 2:00 pm		at Towson	L 59-66	10-15 (3-9)	SECU Arena (1,531); Towson, MD
February 14, 2019; 7:00 pm		Drexel	W 71-69	11-15 (4-9)	JMU Convocation Center (2,084); Harrisonburg, VA
February 16, 2019; 8:00 pm		Delaware	W 68-61	12-15 (5-9)	JMU Convocation Center (3,233); Harrisonburg, VA
February 21, 2019; 7:00 pm		at Northeastern	L 60-76	12-16 (5-10)	Matthews Arena (910); Boston, MA
February 23, 2019; 4:00 pm		at Hofstra	W 104-99 ^{OT}	13-16 (6-10)	Mack Sports Complex (4,649); Hempstead, NY
February 28, 2019; 7:00 pm		Elon	L 58-73	13-17 (6-11)	JMU Convocation Center (2,240); Harrisonburg, VA
March 2, 2019; 4:00 pm		William & Mary	L 66-70	13-18 (6-12)	JMU Convocation Center (3,814); Harrisonburg, VA
CAA tournament
March 9, 2019; 4:00 pm, CAA.tv	(8)	vs. (9) Towson; First round	W 74–73	14–18	North Charleston Coliseum; North Charleston, SC
March 10, 2019; 12:00 pm, CAA.tv	(8)	vs. (1) Hofstra; Quarterfinals	L 67–76	14–19	North Charleston Coliseum; North Charleston, SC
*Non-conference game. ^{#}Rankings from AP Poll. (#) Tournament seedings in parentheses. All times are in Eastern Time.
