= 2018–19 Hofstra Pride men's basketball team =

American college basketball season

2018–19 Hofstra Pride men's basketball

CAA regular season champions

NIT, First Round
- Conference: Colonial Athletic Association
- Record: 27–8 (15–3 CAA)
- Head coach: Joe Mihalich (6th season)
- Assistant coaches: Mike Farrelly; Speedy Claxton; Lamar Barrett
- Home arena: Mack Sports Complex

2018–19 CAA men's basketball standings
	Conf.				Overall
Team	W		L	PCT	W		L	PCT
Hofstra	15	–	3	.833	27	–	8	.771
Northeastern †	14	–	4	.778	23	–	11	.676
Charleston	12	–	6	.667	24	–	9	.727
William & Mary	10	–	8	.556	14	–	17	.452
Delaware	8	–	10	.444	17	–	16	.515
Drexel	7	–	11	.389	13	–	19	.406
Elon	7	–	11	.389	11	–	21	.344
James Madison	6	–	12	.333	14	–	19	.424
Towson	6	–	12	.333	10	–	22	.313
UNC Wilmington	5	–	13	.278	10	–	23	.303
† 2019 CAA tournament winner

The 2018–19 Hofstra Pride men's basketball team represented Hofstra University during the 2018–19 NCAA Division I men's basketball season. The Pride, led by sixth-year head coach Joe Mihalich, played their home games at Mack Sports Complex in Hempstead, New York as members of the Colonial Athletic Association. Hofstra won the CAA regular season championship but lost to Northeastern in the championship game of the 2019 CAA men's basketball tournament. As a regular season champion, who failed to win their league tournament, they received an automatic berth to the 2019 National Invitational Tournament, where they lost to NC State.

== Previous season ==
The Pride finished the 2017–18 season 19–12, 12–6 in CAA play to finish in third place. They lost in the first round of the CAA tournament to UNC Wilmington.

== Offseason ==
=== Departures ===
Name	Number	Pos.	Height	Weight	Year	Hometown	Reason for departure
Rokas Gustys	11	F/C	6'9"	260	Senior	Kaunas, Lithuania	Graduated
Joel Angus III	12	F	6'6"	240	RS Senior	Brooklyn, NY	Graduated
Hunter Sabety	33	F	6'9"	260	RS Senior	Oceanside, NY	Graduated

=== Incoming transfers ===
Name	Number	Pos.	Height	Weight	Year	Hometown	Previous School
Jacquil Taylor	23	F	6'10"	240	RS Senior	Cambridge, MA	Purdue
Dan Dwyer	30	F	6'8"	220	RS Senior	River Forest, IL	Penn
Isaac Kante	32	F	6'7"	236	Sophomore	Brooklyn, NY	Georgia

- Under NCAA transfer rules, Kante will have to sit out for the 2018–19 season. Will have three years of remaining eligibility.

=== 2018 recruiting class ===
College recruiting information
Name	Hometown	School	Height	Weight	Commit date
Hal Hughes; PF	Sydney, Australia	Sydney Grammar School	6 ft 10 in (2.08 m)	201 lb (91 kg)	Feb 26, 2018
Hal Hughes; PF	Recruit ratings: Scout: Rivals: (NR)				
Overall recruit ranking:
Note: In many cases, Scout, Rivals, 247Sports, On3, and ESPN may conflict in their listings of height and weight.; In these cases, the average was taken. ESPN grades are on a 100-point scale.; Sources: "2018 Team Ranking". Rivals.

== Roster ==
2018–19 Hofstra Pride men's basketball team
Players
Coaches

Pos.	#	Name	Height	Weight	Year	Previous school	Hometown
G	0	Tareq Coburn	6 ft 4 in (1.93 m)	195 lb (88 kg)	RS So	Saint Bonaventure University	Rosedale, New York
F	1	Matija Radović	6 ft 7 in (2.01 m)	205 lb (93 kg)	So	Montverde Academy (FL)	Belgrade, Serbia
G	2	Kenny Wormley	6 ft 4 in (1.93 m)	180 lb (82 kg)	Sr	Indian Hills CC	Landover, Maryland
G	3	Justin Wright-Foreman	6 ft 2 in (1.88 m)	190 lb (86 kg)	Sr	High School of Construction	Queens, New York
G	4	Desure Buie	6 ft 0 in (1.83 m)	160 lb (73 kg)	Sr	Wings Academy	Bronx, New York
G	5	Eli Pemberton	6 ft 5 in (1.96 m)	195 lb (88 kg)	Jr	Cheshire Academy	Middletown, Connecticut
F	11	Hal Hughes	6 ft 9 in (2.06 m)	210 lb (95 kg)	Fr	Sydney Grammar	Sydney, Australia
F/C	14	Kevin Schutte	6 ft 9 in (2.06 m)	215 lb (98 kg)	So	CSE Zwolle	Zwolle, Overijssel, The Netherlands
F	15	Stafford Trueheart	6 ft 8 in (2.03 m)	205 lb (93 kg)	Jr	Canisius High School	Lancaster, New York
G	20	Jalen Ray	6 ft 1 in (1.85 m)	175 lb (79 kg)	So	Hampton	Hampton, Virginia
F	23	Jacquil Taylor	6 ft 10 in (2.08 m)	240 lb (109 kg)	RS Sr	Purdue	Cambridge, Massachusetts
G	24	Connor Klementowicz	6 ft 2 in (1.88 m)	200 lb (91 kg)	Jr	Gill St. Bernard's School	Freehold, New Jersey
F	30	Dan Dwyer	6 ft 8 in (2.03 m)	215 lb (98 kg)	RS Sr	Penn	River Forest, Illinois
F	32	Isaac Kante (redshirt)	6 ft 7 in (2.01 m)	230 lb (104 kg)	So	Georgia	Brooklyn, New York

Head coach

- Joe Mihalich (La Salle)

Assistant coach(es)

- Mike Farrelly (Saint Joseph's)
- Speedy Claxton (Hofstra)
- Lamar Barrett (Elizabeth City State)

Legend

- (C) Team captain
- (S) Suspended
- (I) Ineligible
- (W) Walk-on
- Injured
- Current redshirt

Roster

== Schedule and results ==
Date time, TV	Rank^{#}	Opponent^{#}	Result	Record	High points	High rebounds	High assists	Site (attendance) city, state
Non-conference regular season
November 9, 2018*; 7:30 pm		Mount St. Mary's	W 79–61	1–0	20 – Wright-Foreman	10 – Taylor	5 – Tied	Mack Sports Complex (4,645); Hempstead, NY
November 11, 2018*; 2:30 pm, ESPN+		at Marshall	L 72–76	1–1	34 – Wright-Foreman	12 – Pemberton	2 – Dwyer	Cam Henderson Center (7,854); Huntington, WV
November 14, 2018*; 7:00 pm		North Carolina A&T	W 92–72	2–1	22 – Wright-Foreman	6 – Taylor	7 – Tied	Mack Sports Complex (1,209); Hempstead, NY
November 16, 2018*; 7:00 pm, BTN Plus		at Maryland	L 69–80	2–2	27 – Wright-Foreman	5 – Tied	2 – Tied	Xfinity Center (12,346); College Park, MD
November 21, 2018*; 7:00 pm		Cal State Fullerton	W 80–71	3–2	37 – Wright-Foreman	9 – Taylor	6 – Wright-Foreman	Mack Sports Complex (1,153); Hempstead, NY
November 24, 2018*; 7:00 pm, MASN		at VCU; A10–CAA Challenge	L 67–69 ^{OT}	3–3	27 – Wright-Foreman	17 – Taylor	4 – Tied	Siegel Center (7,637); Richmond, VA
November 28, 2018*; 7:00 pm		Siena	W 94–86	4–3	28 – Wright-Foreman	14 – Coburn	4 – Tied	Mack Sports Complex (1,046); Hempstead, NY
December 1, 2018*; 2:00 pm		at Kennesaw State	W 78–52	5–3	20 – Wright-Foreman	7 – Pemberton	5 – Wright-Foreman	KSU Convocation Center (683); Kennesaw, GA
December 5, 2018*; 7:00 pm		Monmouth	W 75–73	6–3	30 – Wright-Foreman	9 – Taylor	6 – Buie	Mack Sports Complex (1,547); Hempstead, NY
December 8, 2018*; 4:00 pm		Rider	W 89–73	7–3	24 – Wright-Foreman	8 – Coburn	6 – Tied	Mack Sports Complex (1,676); Hempstead, NY
December 10, 2018*; 4:00 pm		at Manhattan	W 80–50	8–3	22 – Coburn	10 – Coburn	6 – Buie	Draddy Gymnasium (602); Riverdale, NY
December 19, 2018*; 7:00 pm		at Stony Brook	W 71–64	9–3	25 – Wright-Foreman	12 – Taylor	4 – Buie	Island Federal Arena (2,539); Stony Brook, NY
December 22, 2018*; 4:00 pm		Rosemont	W 107–54	10–3	20 – Wormley	13 – Trueheart	10 – Buie	Mack Sports Complex (1,011); Hempstead, NY
CAA regular season
December 28, 2018; 7:00 pm		Delaware	W 91–46	11–3 (1–0)	29 – Wright-Foreman	12 – Taylor	5 – Buie	Mack Sports Complex (1,502); Hempstead, NY
December 30, 2018; 4:00 pm		Drexel	W 89–75	12–3 (2–0)	34 – Wright-Foreman	5 – Wright-Foreman	10 – Buie	Mack Sports Complex (1,512); Hempstead, NY
January 5, 2019; 4:00 pm		Northeastern	W 75–72	13–3 (3–0)	42 – Wright-Foreman	7 – Wright-Foreman	5 – Buie	Mack Sports Complex (1,618); Hempstead, NY
January 10, 2019; 7:00 pm		at William & Mary	W 93–90 ^{3OT}	14–3 (4–0)	37 – Wright-Foreman	12 – Taylor	8 – Buie	Kaplan Arena (3,176); Williamsburg, VA
January 12, 2019; 7:00 pm		at Elon	W 74–71	15–3 (5–0)	21 – Wright-Foreman	7 – Taylor	5 – Buie	Schar Center (1,490); Elon, NC
January 17, 2019; 7:00 pm		UNC Wilmington	W 87–72	16–3 (6–0)	24 – Pemberton	12 – Taylor	7 – Buie	Mack Sports Complex (1,504); Hempstead, NY
January 19, 2019; 4:00 pm		College of Charleston	W 86–72	17–3 (7–0)	26 – Pemberton	5 – Pemberton	4 – Wright-Foreman	Mack Sports Complex (2,217); Hempstead, NY
January 24, 2019; 7:00 pm		at James Madison	W 85–68	18–3 (8–0)	23 – Wright-Foreman	8 – Pemberton	6 – Buie	JMU Convocation Center (2,109); Harrisonburg, VA
January 26, 2019; 4:00 pm		at Towson	W 84–61	19–3 (9–0)	25 – Wright-Foreman	6 – Pemberton	7 – Buie	SECU Arena (1,604); Towson, MD
February 2, 2019; 4:30 pm		at Northeastern	L 61–75	19–4 (9–1)	22 – Buie	11 – Taylor	2 – Taylor	Matthews Arena (1,208); Boston, MA
February 7, 2019; 7:00 pm		Elon	W 102–61	20–4 (10–1)	21 – Coburn	9 – Taylor	9 – Pemberton	Mack Sports Complex (2,521); Hempstead, NY
February 9, 2019; 4:00 pm		William & Mary	W 93–87	21–4 (11–1)	48 – Wright-Foreman	15 – Taylor	6 – Buie	Mack Sports Complex (4,208); Hempstead, NY
February 14, 2019; 7:00 pm		at College of Charleston	W 99–95	22–4 (12–1)	30 – Wright-Foreman	8 – Taylor	10 – Buie	TD Arena (4,095); Charleston, SC
February 16, 2019; 7:00 pm		at UNC Wilmington	L 79–87	22–5 (12–2)	30 – Wright-Foreman	12 – Taylor	4 – Buie	Trask Coliseum (4,250); Wilmington, NC
February 21, 2019; 7:00 pm		Towson	W 91–82 ^{2OT}	23–5 (13–2)	28 – Wright-Foreman	17 – Taylor	9 – Buie	Mack Sports Complex (3,587); Hempstead, NY
February 23, 2019; 4:00 pm		James Madison	L 99–104	23–6 (13–3)	33 – Wright-Foreman	8 – Dwyer	12 – Buie	Mack Sports Complex (4,649); Hempstead, NY
February 28, 2019; 7:00 pm		at Drexel	W 80–77	24–6 (14–3)	32 – Wright-Foreman	9 – Taylor	2 – Tied	Daskalakis Athletic Center (1,019); Philadelphia, PA
March 2, 2019; 4:00 pm		at Delaware	W 92–70	25–6 (15–3)	28 – Wright-Foreman	13 – Taylor	5 – Buie	Bob Carpenter Center (3,816); Newark, DE
CAA tournament
March 10, 2019; 12:00 pm, CAA.tv	(1)	vs. (8) James Madison; Quarterfinals	W 76–67	26–6	17 – Wright-Foreman	11 – Taylor	4 – Wright-Foreman	North Charleston Coliseum; North Charleston, SC
March 11, 2019; 6:00 pm, CBSSN	(1)	vs. (5) Delaware; Semifinals	W 78–74 ^{OT}	27–6	42 – Wright-Foreman	6 – Pemberton	4 – Buie	North Charleston Coliseum; North Charleston, SC
March 12, 2019; 7:00 pm, CBSSN	(1)	vs. (2) Northeastern; CAA Championship	L 74–82	27–7	29 – Wright-Foreman	15 – Taylor	2 – Tied	North Charleston Coliseum (2,892); North Charleston, SC
NIT
March 19, 2019*; 7:00 pm, ESPN2	(7)	at (2) NC State; First round – UNC Greensboro bracket	L 78–84	27–8	29 – Wright-Foreman	8 – Taylor	5 – Wright-Foreman	Reynolds Coliseum (5,500); Raleigh, NC
*Non-conference game. ^{#}Rankings from AP Poll. (#) Tournament seedings in parentheses. All times are in Eastern Time.

== Rankings ==
Ranking movements Legend: ██ Increase in ranking ██ Decrease in ranking — = Not ranked RV = Received votes
	Week																			
Poll	Pre	1	2	3	4	5	6	7	8	9	10	11	12	13	14	15	16	17	18	Final
AP													RV	RV	—					Not released
Coaches														RV	RV	RV	RV	RV	RV	

*AP does not release post-NCAA Tournament rankings

== See also ==
2018–19 Hofstra Pride women's basketball team
