= 2018–19 Charleston Cougars men's basketball team =

American college basketball season

2018–19 Charleston Cougars men's basketball
- Conference: Colonial Athletic Association
- Record: 24–9 (12–6 CAA)
- Head coach: Earl Grant (5th season)
- Assistant coaches: J.D. Powell; Quinton Ferrell; Mantoris Robinson
- Home arena: TD Arena

2018–19 CAA men's basketball standings
	Conf.				Overall
Team	W		L	PCT	W		L	PCT
Hofstra	15	–	3	.833	27	–	8	.771
Northeastern †	14	–	4	.778	23	–	11	.676
Charleston	12	–	6	.667	24	–	9	.727
William & Mary	10	–	8	.556	14	–	17	.452
Delaware	8	–	10	.444	17	–	16	.515
Drexel	7	–	11	.389	13	–	19	.406
Elon	7	–	11	.389	11	–	21	.344
James Madison	6	–	12	.333	14	–	19	.424
Towson	6	–	12	.333	10	–	22	.313
UNC Wilmington	5	–	13	.278	10	–	23	.303
† 2019 CAA tournament winner

The 2018–19 College of Charleston Cougars men's basketball team represented the College of Charleston during the 2018–19 NCAA Division I men's basketball season. The Cougars, led by fifth-year head coach Earl Grant, played their home games at the TD Arena in Charleston, South Carolina as members of the Colonial Athletic Association.

== Previous season ==
The Cougars finished the 2017–18 season 26–8, 14–4 in CAA play to share the regular season title with Northeastern. At the CAA tournament they defeated Drexel, William & Mary, and Northeastern to become CAA Tournament champions. They earned the CAA's automatic bid to the NCAA tournament as a #13 seed where they lost in the first round to Auburn.

== Offseason ==
=== Departures ===
Name	Number	Pos.	Height	Weight	Year	Hometown	Reason for departure
John Eck	4	G	6'4"	170	Senior	Hilton Head Island, SC	Left team
Evan Bailey	11	F	6'6"	210	Senior	Canton, OH	Graduated
Cameron Johnson	12	G	6'4"	200	Senior	Athens, GA	Graduated
Joe Chealey	13	G	6'4"	190	Senior	Orlando, FL	Graduated

=== 2018 recruiting class ===
College recruiting information
Name	Hometown	School	Height	Weight	Commit date
Jaylen Richard; SG	Durham, NC	Charles E. Jordan High School	6 ft 4 in (1.93 m)	175 lb (79 kg)	Apr 23, 2018
Jaylen Richard; SG	Recruit ratings: Scout: Rivals: (NR)				
Quan McCluney; SF	Gastonia, NC	Gaston Day School	6 ft 6 in (1.98 m)	195 lb (88 kg)	Jul 28, 2016
Quan McCluney; SF	Recruit ratings: Scout: Rivals: (NR)				
Isaih Moore; SF	Sumter, SC	Sumter High School	6 ft 8 in (2.03 m)	180 lb (82 kg)	Oct 20, 2017
Isaih Moore; SF	Recruit ratings: Scout: Rivals: (NR)				
Overall recruit ranking:
Note: In many cases, Scout, Rivals, 247Sports, On3, and ESPN may conflict in their listings of height and weight.; In these cases, the average was taken. ESPN grades are on a 100-point scale.; Sources: "2018 Team Ranking". Rivals.

=== 2019 recruiting class ===
College recruiting information (2019)
Name	Hometown	School	Height	Weight	Commit date
Brenden Tucker #35 PG	Dacula, GA	Dacula High School	6 ft 1 in (1.85 m)	170 lb (77 kg)	Aug 24, 2018
Brenden Tucker #35 PG	Recruit ratings: Scout: Rivals: 247Sports: (79)				
Trevon Reddish; PG	McDonough, GA	Eagles Landing Christian Academy	6 ft 4 in (1.93 m)	185 lb (84 kg)	Sep 30, 2018
Trevon Reddish; PG	Recruit ratings: Scout: Rivals: 247Sports: (0)				
DeAngelo Epps; SF	Charlotte, NC	Charlotte Country Day	6 ft 5 in (1.96 m)	200 lb (91 kg)	May 16, 2018
DeAngelo Epps; SF	Recruit ratings: Scout: Rivals: 247Sports: (NR)				
Overall recruit ranking:
Note: In many cases, Scout, Rivals, 247Sports, On3, and ESPN may conflict in their listings of height and weight.; In these cases, the average was taken. ESPN grades are on a 100-point scale.; Sources: "2019 Team Ranking". Rivals.

== Roster ==
2018–19 College of Charleston Cougars men's basketball team
Players
Coaches

Pos.	#	Name	Height	Weight	Year	Previous school	Hometown
G	0	Jaylen Richard	6 ft 4 in (1.93 m)	175 lb (79 kg)	Fr	Charles E. Jordan HS	Durham, North Carolina
G	1	Grant Riller	6 ft 3 in (1.91 m)	195 lb (88 kg)	RS Jr	Ocoee HS	Ocoee, Florida
G	2	Brevin Galloway	6 ft 2 in (1.88 m)	215 lb (98 kg)	RS So	Seneca Senior HS	Anderson, South Carolina
F	3	Sam Miller	6 ft 9 in (2.06 m)	240 lb (109 kg)	Jr	Gonzaga College HS	Arlington, Virginia
G	4	Zach Rabinowitz (W)	6 ft 2 in (1.88 m)	200 lb (91 kg)	Jr	Providence HS	Charlotte, North Carolina
F	5	Jarrell Brantley	6 ft 7 in (2.01 m)	250 lb (113 kg)	Sr	Notre Dame Prep (MA)	Columbia, South Carolina
G	10	Zep Jasper	6 ft 1 in (1.85 m)	170 lb (77 kg)	RS Fr	Laney HS	Augusta, Georgia
F	11	Isaih Moore	6 ft 9 in (2.06 m)	195 lb (88 kg)	Fr	Sumter HS	Columbia, South Carolina
G	13	Quan McCluney	6 ft 6 in (1.98 m)	200 lb (91 kg)	Fr	Gaston Day School	Gastonia, North Carolina
G	15	Trent Robinson (W)	5 ft 11 in (1.8 m)	180 lb (82 kg)	Sr	Ridge View HS	Columbia, South Carolina
G	21	Marquise Pointer	6 ft 0 in (1.83 m)	220 lb (100 kg)	Sr	Jonesboro HS	Jonesboro, Arkansas
F	22	Jermaine Blackmon Jr.	6 ft 2 in (1.88 m)	230 lb (104 kg)	Sr	Davidson Day School	Charlotte, North Carolina
F	23	Nick Harris	6 ft 10 in (2.08 m)	260 lb (118 kg)	Sr	St. Pius X Catholic HS	Dacula, Georgia
F	24	Jaylen McManus	6 ft 7 in (2.01 m)	230 lb (104 kg)	Jr	North Mecklenburg HS	Charlotte, North Carolina
F/C	33	Osinachi Smart	6 ft 8 in (2.03 m)	235 lb (107 kg)	RS So	New Garden Friends School	Umuahia, Nigeria
C	40	Samba Ndiaye	6 ft 10 in (2.08 m)	230 lb (104 kg)	So	Sunrise Christian Academy (KS)	Thiès, Senegal

Head coach

- Earl Grant (Georgia College)

Assistant coach(es)

- J.D. Powell (Clemson)
- Quinton Ferrell (Presbyterian)
- Mantoris Robinson (Winthrop)

Legend

- (C) Team captain
- (S) Suspended
- (I) Ineligible
- (W) Walk-on
- Injured
- Current redshirt

Roster
Last update: August 30, 2018

== Schedule and results ==
Date time, TV	Rank^{#}	Opponent^{#}	Result	Record	Site (attendance) city, state
Exhibition
November 1, 2018*; 7:00 pm		Benedict	W 95–43		TD Arena (2,987); Charleston, SC
Non-conference regular season
November 6, 2018*; 7:00 pm		Presbyterian	W 85–73	1–0	TD Arena (3,711); Charleston, SC
November 10, 2018*; 12:00 pm, ESPN3		at Western Carolina	W 77–74	2–0	Ramsey Center (1,689); Cullowhee, NC
November 13, 2018*; 7:00 pm		Rhode Island; A10–CAA Challenge	W 66–55	3–0	TD Arena (4,276); Charleston, SC
November 18, 2018*; 4:00 pm, FSOK		at Oklahoma State; AdvoCare Invitational campus game	L 58–70	3–1	Gallagher-Iba Arena (6,595); Stillwater, OK
November 22, 2018*; 7:00 pm, ESPNU		vs. No. 19 LSU; AdvoCare Invitational quarterfinals	L 55–67	3–2	HP Field House (2,226); Lake Buena Vista, FL
November 23, 2018*; 7:00 pm, ESPN3		vs. UAB; AdvoCare Invitational	W 74–51	4–2	HP Field House (2,185); Lake Buena Vista, FL
November 25, 2018*; 6:30 pm, ESPNU		vs. Memphis; AdvoCare Invitational	W 78–75	5–2	HP Field House (1,933); Lake Buena Vista, FL
November 28, 2018*; 7:00 pm		South Carolina State	W 83–70	6–2	TD Arena (4,167); Charleston, SC
December 1, 2018*; 4:00 pm		Charlotte	W 72–64	7–2	TD Arena (4,134); Charleston, SC
December 9, 2018*; 2:00 pm		Georgia College	W 87–59	8–2	TD Arena (3,987); Charleston, SC
December 15, 2018*; 4:00 pm, NBCSN		at VCU	W 83–79	9–2	Siegel Center (7,637); Richmond, VA
December 18, 2018*; 7:00 pm		at Siena	W 83–58	10–2	Times Union Center (4,614); Albany, NY
December 21, 2018*; 7:00 pm		Coastal Carolina	W 73–71	11–2	TD Arena (4,054); Charleston, SC
CAA regular season
December 29, 2018; 7:00 pm		at UNC Wilmington	W 73–66	12–2 (1–0)	Trask Coliseum (3,748); Wilmington, NC
January 3, 2019; 7:00 pm		at Towson	W 67–55	13–2 (2–0)	SECU Arena (1,058); Towson, MD
January 5, 2019; 7:00 pm		at James Madison	L 58–69	13–3 (2–1)	JMU Convocation Center (2,224); Harrisonburg, VA
January 10, 2019; 7:00 pm		Drexel	L 78–79	13–4 (2–2)	TD Arena (4,116); Charleston, SC
January 12, 2019; 4:00 pm		Delaware	W 71–58	14–4 (3–2)	TD Arena (4,320); Charleston, SC
January 17, 2019; 7:00 pm, NESNPlus		at Northeastern	L 60–69	14–5 (3–3)	Matthews Arena (1,074); Boston, MA
January 19, 2019; 4:00 pm		at Hofstra	L 72–86	14–6 (3–4)	Mack Sports Complex (2,217); Hempstead, NY
January 24, 2019; 7:00 pm		Elon	W 72–53	15–6 (4–4)	TD Arena (3,714); Charleston, SC
January 26, 2019; 4:00 pm		William & Mary	W 74–59	16–6 (5–4)	TD Arena (4,569); Charleston, SC
January 31, 2019; 7:00 pm		James Madison	W 70–53	17–6 (6–4)	TD Arena (3,933); Charleston, SC
February 2, 2019; 4:00 pm		Towson	W 54–53	18–6 (7–4)	TD Arena (4,194); Charleston, SC
February 7, 2019; 7:00 pm		at Delaware	W 83–75	19–6 (8–4)	Bob Carpenter Center (1,726); Newark, DE
February 9, 2019; 4:00 pm		at Drexel	W 86–84	20–6 (9–4)	Daskalakis Athletic Center (1,175); Philadelphia, PA
February 14, 2019; 7:00 pm		Hofstra	L 95–99	20–7 (9–5)	TD Arena (4,095); Charleston, SC
February 16, 2019; 4:00 pm		Northeastern	W 88–79	21–7 (10–5)	TD Arena (4,867); Charleston, SC
February 21, 2019; 7:00 pm		at William & Mary	L 84–86 ^{OT}	21–8 (10–6)	Kaplan Arena (3,658); Williamsburg, VA
February 23, 2019; 7:00 pm		at Elon	W 84–74	22–8 (11–6)	Schar Center (3,623); Elon, NC
March 2, 2019; 4:00 pm		UNC Wilmington	W 70–61	23–8 (12–6)	TD Arena (4,898); Charleston, SC
CAA tournament
March 10, 2019; 8:30 pm	(3)	vs. (6) Drexel; CAA Tournament Quarterfinal	W 73–61	24–8	North Charleston Coliseum (4,040); North Charleston, SC
March 11, 2019; 8:30 pm, CBSSN	(3)	vs. (2) Northeastern; CAA Tournament Semifinal	L 67–70	24–9	North Charleston Coliseum (3,599); North Charleston, SC
*Non-conference game. ^{#}Rankings from AP Poll. (#) Tournament seedings in parentheses. All times are in Eastern Time.
