= 2018–19 William & Mary Tribe men's basketball team =

American college basketball season

2018–19 William & Mary Tribe men's basketball
- Conference: Colonial Athletic Association
- Record: 14–17 (10–8 CAA)
- Head coach: Tony Shaver (16th season)
- Assistant coaches: Jonathan Holmes; Austin Shaver; Julian Boatner
- Home arena: Kaplan Arena

2018–19 CAA men's basketball standings
	Conf.				Overall
Team	W		L	PCT	W		L	PCT
Hofstra	15	–	3	.833	27	–	8	.771
Northeastern †	14	–	4	.778	23	–	11	.676
Charleston	12	–	6	.667	24	–	9	.727
William & Mary	10	–	8	.556	14	–	17	.452
Delaware	8	–	10	.444	17	–	16	.515
Drexel	7	–	11	.389	13	–	19	.406
Elon	7	–	11	.389	11	–	21	.344
James Madison	6	–	12	.333	14	–	19	.424
Towson	6	–	12	.333	10	–	22	.313
UNC Wilmington	5	–	13	.278	10	–	23	.303
† 2019 CAA tournament winner

The 2018–19 William & Mary Tribe men's basketball team represented the College of William & Mary during the 2018–19 NCAA Division I men's basketball season. The Tribe, led by 16th-year head coach Tony Shaver, played their home games at Kaplan Arena in Williamsburg, Virginia as members of the Colonial Athletic Association. Street & Smith's preseason basketball preview rated William & Mary with the toughest schedule in the CAA.

== Previous season ==
The Tribe finished the 2017–18 season 19–12, 11–7 in CAA play to finish in fourth place. They defeated Towson in the quarterfinals of the CAA tournament before losing in the semifinals to College of Charleston.

== Offseason ==
=== Departures ===
Name	Number	Pos.	Height	Weight	Year	Hometown	Reason for departure
Jamison Glover	1	G	6'0"	195	Senior	Haymarket, VA	Graduated
Tommy Papas	5	G	6'3"	195	Senior	Plainfield, NJ	Graduated
Connor Burchfield	10	G	6'4"	180	Senior	Concord, NC	Graduated
Cole Harrison	15	F	6'11"	252	RS senior	Brentwood, TN	Graduated
Oliver Tot	21	G	6'6"	200	Senior	Bratislava, Slovakia	Graduated
Omar Mostafa	24	G	6'2"	204	Sophomore	Saddle River, NJ	Left team
Amir Shafi	33	G/F	6'4"	210	Senior	Delran, NJ	Graduated
David Cohn	34	G	6'2"	168	RS senior	Elmhurst, IL	Graduated

=== Incoming transfers ===
Name	Number	Pos.	Height	Weight	Year	Hometown	Previous school
Andy Van Vliet	5	F	7'0"	228	Senior	Antwerp, Belgium	Wisconsin
Christian Clark	24	F	6'6"	210	Senior	Chester, VA	Alabama

- Under NCAA transfer rules, Andy Van Vliet had to sit out for the 2018–19 season, and had one year of remaining eligibility.

=== 2018 recruiting class ===
College recruiting
Name	Hometown	School	Height	Weight	Commit date
L.J. Owens #74 SG	Severna Park, MD	Severna Park High School	6 ft 2 in (1.88 m)	160 lb (73 kg)	Apr 25, 2017
L.J. Owens #74 SG	Recruit ratings: Scout: Rivals: (71)				
Thornton Scott; PG	Glen Cove, NY	Holy Trinity Diocesan High School	6 ft 4 in (1.93 m)	170 lb (77 kg)	Sep 27, 2017
Thornton Scott; PG	Recruit ratings: Scout: Rivals: (NR)				
Chase Audige; PG	Coram, NY	The Hill School	6 ft 4 in (1.93 m)	170 lb (77 kg)	Oct 16, 2017
Chase Audige; PG	Recruit ratings: Scout: Rivals: 247Sports: (NR)				
Quinn Blair; SF	Livonia, MI	Divine Child High School	6 ft 6 in (1.98 m)	200 lb (91 kg)	Oct 16, 2017
Quinn Blair; SF	Recruit ratings: Scout: Rivals: 247Sports: (NR)				
Mehkel Harvey; PF	Huntington Beach, CA	Ocean View High School	6 ft 6 in (1.98 m)	170 lb (77 kg)	May 7, 2018
Mehkel Harvey; PF	Recruit ratings: Scout: Rivals: 247Sports: (NR)				
Overall recruit ranking: 247Sports: 159
Note: In many cases, Scout, Rivals, 247Sports, On3, and ESPN may conflict in their listings of height and weight.; In these cases, the average was taken. ESPN grades are on a 100-point scale.; Sources: "2018 Team Ranking". Rivals.

=== 2019 recruiting class ===
College recruiting (2019)
Name	Hometown	School	Height	Weight	Commit date
Cameron Brown; SG	Greenbelt, MD	Eleanor Roosevelt High School	6 ft 6 in (1.98 m)	190 lb (86 kg)	Oct 9, 2018
Cameron Brown; SG	Recruit ratings: Scout: Rivals: (NR)				
Overall recruit ranking:
Note: In many cases, Scout, Rivals, 247Sports, On3, and ESPN may conflict in their listings of height and weight.; In these cases, the average was taken. ESPN grades are on a 100-point scale.; Sources: "2019 Team Ranking". Rivals.

== Roster ==
2018–19 William & Mary Tribe men's basketball team
Players
Coaches

Pos.	#	Name	Height	Weight	Year	Previous school	Hometown
G	0	Jihar Williams	6 ft 5 in (1.96 m)	195 lb (88 kg)	So	Friends School of Baltimore	Baltimore, MD
G	1	Thornton Scott	6 ft 5 in (1.96 m)	178 lb (81 kg)	Fr	Holy Trinity HS	Glen Cove, NY
G	2	Matt Milon	6 ft 5 in (1.96 m)	195 lb (88 kg)	RS Jr	Oviedo HS/Boston College	Oviedo, FL
F	5	Andy Van Vliet (I)	7 ft 0 in (2.13 m)	228 lb (103 kg)	Sr	Antwerp Giants/Wisconsin	Antwerp, Belgium
G	11	L.J. Owens	6 ft 3 in (1.91 m)	165 lb (75 kg)	Fr	Severn School	Annapolis, MD
G	12	Luke Loewe	6 ft 4 in (1.93 m)	192 lb (87 kg)	So	Fond du Lac HS	Fond du Lac, WI
C	13	Nathan Knight	6 ft 10 in (2.08 m)	235 lb (107 kg)	Jr	Nottingham HS/Kimball Union Academy	Syracuse, NY
G	15	Chase Audige	6 ft 4 in (1.93 m)	190 lb (86 kg)	RS Fr	The Hill School	Coram, NY
G/F	21	Quinn Blair	6 ft 8 in (2.03 m)	205 lb (93 kg)	Fr	Divine Child HS	Livonia, MI
F	22	Paul Rowley	6 ft 8 in (2.03 m)	205 lb (93 kg)	RS Sr	Loudoun Valley HS	Purcellville, VA
G/F	23	Justin Pierce	6 ft 6 in (1.98 m)	215 lb (98 kg)	Jr	Glenbard West HS	Glen Ellyn, IL
F	30	Mehkel Harvey	6 ft 9 in (2.06 m)	200 lb (91 kg)	RS Fr	Ocean View HS	Huntington Beach, CA
F	33	Christian Clark (W)	6 ft 6 in (1.98 m)	205 lb (93 kg)	Sr	Thomas Dale HS/Alabama	Chester, VA

Head coach

- Tony Shaver (North Carolina)

Assistant coach(es)

- Jonathan Holmes (North Carolina)
- Austin Shaver (Virginia)
- Julian Boatner (William & Mary)

Legend

- (C) Team captain
- (S) Suspended
- (I) Ineligible
- (W) Walk-on
- Injured
- Current redshirt

Roster
Last update: September 6, 2018

== Honors and awards ==
=== Street & Smith's Preseason All Colonial ===
- Nathan Knight

=== Athlon Sports Preseason All CAA 2nd Team ===
- Nathan Knight
- Justin Pierce

=== Lindy's Sports Preseason All Conference 1st Team ===
- Nathan Knight

=== Lindy's Sports Preseason Best Shooter ===
- Matt Milon

=== Lindy's Sports Preseason Best NBA Prospect ===
- Nathan Knight

== Schedule and results ==
Date time, TV	Rank^{#}	Opponent^{#}	Result	Record	Site (attendance) city, state
Non-conference regular season
November 7, 2018*; 7:00 pm		High Point	W 79–69	1–0	Kaplan Arena (3,301); Williamsburg, VA
November 10, 2018*; 5:00 pm, ESPN+		at Duquesne; Gotham Classic	L 70–84	1–1	Palumbo Center (2,534); Pittsburgh, PA
November 15, 2018*; 7:00 pm, NBCSC/ESPN3		at UIC; Gotham Classic	L 95–100 ^{OT}	1–2	Credit Union 1 Arena (2,409); Chicago, IL
November 17, 2018*; 12:00 pm, ACCN Extra		at Notre Dame; Gotham Classic	L 64–73	1–3	Edmund P. Joyce Center (6,511); Notre Dame, IN
November 20, 2018*; 7:00 pm		Radford; Gotham Classic	L 72–81	1–4	Kaplan Arena (3,370); Williamsburg, VA
November 24, 2018*; 4:00 pm		Saint Joseph's; A10–CAA Challenge	W 87–85	2–4	Kaplan Arena (2,878); Williamsburg, VA
November 28, 2018*; 7:00 pm		at Marshall	L 64–84	2–5	Cam Henderson Center (6,187); Huntington, WV
December 1, 2018*; 4:00 pm		George Mason	L 84–87	2–6	Kaplan Arena (3,332); Williamsburg, VA
December 5, 2018*; 7:00 pm, ESPN+		at Old Dominion; Rivalry	L 53–71	2–7	Ted Constant Center (6,501); Norfolk, VA
December 8, 2018*; 4:00 pm		at Hampton	W 76–71	3–7	Hampton Convocation Center (3,543); Hampton, VA
December 16, 2018*; 4:00 pm		William Peace	W 106–89	4–7	Kaplan Arena (3,140); Williamsburg, VA
December 22, 2018*; 2:00 pm, ACCN Extra		at No. 5 Virginia	L 40–72	4–8	John Paul Jones Arena (14,623); Charlottesville, VA
CAA regular season
December 28, 2018; 7:00 pm		James Madison	W 79–74	5–8 (1–0)	Kaplan Arena (3,690); Williamsburg, VA
December 30, 2018; 4:00 pm		Towson	W 71–61	6–8 (2–0)	Kaplan Arena (3,346); Williamsburg, VA
January 3, 2019; 7:00 pm		at Delaware	L 56–58	6–9 (2–1)	Bob Carpenter Center (1,601); Newark, DE
January 5, 2019; 4:00 pm		at Drexel	W 84–66	7–9 (3–1)	Daskalakis Athletic Center (831); Philadelphia, PA
January 10, 2019; 7:00 pm		Hofstra	L 90–93 ^{3OT}	7–10 (3–2)	Kaplan Arena (3,176); Williamsburg, VA
January 12, 2019; 4:00 pm		Northeastern	L 70–90	7–11 (3–3)	Kaplan Arena (3,367); Williamsburg, VA
January 19, 2019; 4:00 pm		Elon	L 71–76	7–12 (3–4)	Kaplan Arena (3,845); Williamsburg, VA
January 24, 2019; 7:00 pm		at UNC Wilmington	L 88–93	7–13 (3–5)	Trask Coliseum (3,889); Wilmington, NC
January 26, 2019; 4:00 pm		at College of Charleston	L 59–74	7–14 (3–6)	TD Arena (4,569); Charleston, SC
January 31, 2019; 7:00 pm		Drexel	W 75–69	8–14 (4–6)	Kaplan Arena (3,034); Williamsburg, VA
February 2, 2019; 4:00 pm		Delaware	W 84–63	9–14 (5–6)	Kaplan Arena (4,611); Williamsburg, VA
February 7, 2019; 7:00 pm		at Northeastern	L 60–72	9–15 (5–7)	Matthews Arena (795); Boston, MA
February 9, 2019; 4:00 pm		at Hofstra	L 87–93	9–16 (5–8)	Mack Sports Complex (4,208); Hempstead, NY
February 16, 2019; 7:00 pm		at Elon	W 84–74	10–16 (6–8)	Schar Center (2,651); Elon, NC
February 21, 2019; 4:00 pm		College of Charleston	W 86–84 ^{OT}	11–16 (7–8)	Kaplan Arena (3,658); Williamsburg, VA
February 23, 2019; 4:00 pm		UNC Wilmington	W 71–63	12–16 (8–8)	Kaplan Arena (3,836); Williamsburg, VA
February 28, 2019; 7:00 pm		at Towson	W 67–65	13–16 (9–8)	SECU Arena (1,511); Towson, MD
March 2, 2019; 4:00 pm		at James Madison	W 70–66	14–16 (10–8)	JMU Convocation Center (3,814); Harrisonburg, VA
CAA Tournament
March 10, 2019; 2:30 pm	(4)	vs. (5) Delaware; Quarterfinals	L 79–85	14–17	North Charleston Coliseum (2,796); North Charleston, SC
*Non-conference game. ^{#}Rankings from AP Poll. (#) Tournament seedings in parentheses. All times are in Eastern Time.
