= 2018–19 Delaware Fightin' Blue Hens men's basketball team =

American college basketball season

2018–19 Delaware Fightin' Blue Hens men's basketball
- Conference: Colonial Athletic Association
- Record: 17–16 (8–10 CAA)
- Head coach: Martin Ingelsby (3rd season)
- Assistant coaches: Bill Phillips; Corey McCrae; Torrian Jones
- Home arena: Bob Carpenter Center

2018–19 CAA men's basketball standings
	Conf.				Overall
Team	W		L	PCT	W		L	PCT
Hofstra	15	–	3	.833	27	–	8	.771
Northeastern †	14	–	4	.778	23	–	11	.676
Charleston	12	–	6	.667	24	–	9	.727
William & Mary	10	–	8	.556	14	–	17	.452
Delaware	8	–	10	.444	17	–	16	.515
Drexel	7	–	11	.389	13	–	19	.406
Elon	7	–	11	.389	11	–	21	.344
James Madison	6	–	12	.333	14	–	19	.424
Towson	6	–	12	.333	10	–	22	.313
UNC Wilmington	5	–	13	.278	10	–	23	.303
† 2019 CAA tournament winner

The 2018–19 Delaware Fightin' Blue Hens men's basketball team represented the University of Delaware during the 2018–19 NCAA Division I men's basketball season. The Fightin' Blue Hens, led by third-year head coach Martin Ingelsby, played their home games at the Bob Carpenter Center in Newark, Delaware as members of the Colonial Athletic Association.

== Previous season ==
The Fightin' Blue Hens finished the 2017–18 season 14–19, 6–12 in CAA play to finish in a four-way tie for seventh place. They defeated Elon in the first round of the CAA tournament before losing in the quarterfinals to Northeastern.

== Offseason ==
=== Departures ===
Name	Number	Pos.	Height	Weight	Year	Hometown	Reason for departure
Ryan Daly	0	G	6'5"	225	Sophomore	Ardmore, PA	Transferred to Saint Joseph's
Anthony Mosley	3	G	6'1"	180	Senior	Wilmington, DE	Graduated
Derrick Woods	20	F	6'8"	240	RS Sophomore	Trenton, NJ	Dismissed from team
Skye Johnson	23	F	6'8"	250	Senior	Dumfries, VA	Graduated

=== Incoming transfers ===
Name	Number	Pos.	Height	Weight	Year	Hometown	Previous School
Nate Darling	3	G	6'5"	190	Junior	Halifax, NS	UAB
Ryan Johnson	13	G	6'5"	192	RS Senior	Greenboro, NC	Mercer
Justin Mutts	25	F	6'7"	220	Sophomore	Millville, NJ	High Point

- Under NCAA transfer rules, Darling and Mutts will have to sit out for the 2018–19 season. Will have three years of remaining eligibility.

=== Recruiting class of 2018 ===
College recruiting
Name	Hometown	School	Height	Weight	Commit date
Ithiel Horton; PG	Jersey City, NJ	Roselle Catholic High School	6 ft 3 in (1.91 m)	180 lb (82 kg)	Sep 18, 2017
Ithiel Horton; PG	Recruit ratings: No ratings found				
Aleks Novakovich; PF	Hobart, IN	Bosco Institute	6 ft 10 in (2.08 m)	195 lb (88 kg)	Apr 26, 2018
Aleks Novakovich; PF	Recruit ratings: No ratings found				
Matt Veretto; PF	Manchester, CT	East Catholic High School	6 ft 7 in (2.01 m)	190 lb (86 kg)	Feb 7, 2018
Matt Veretto; PF	Recruit ratings: No ratings found				
Overall recruit ranking:
Note: In many cases, Scout, Rivals, 247Sports, On3, and ESPN may conflict in their listings of height and weight.; In these cases, the average was taken. ESPN grades are on a 100-point scale.; Sources: "2018 Team Ranking". Rivals.

=== Recruiting class of 2019 ===
College recruiting (2019)
Name	Hometown	School	Height	Weight	Commit date
John McCoy; SF	Mansfield, MA	The Tilton School	6 ft 5 in (1.96 m)	N/A	May 3, 2018
John McCoy; SF	Recruit ratings: No ratings found				
Overall recruit ranking:
Note: In many cases, Scout, Rivals, 247Sports, On3, and ESPN may conflict in their listings of height and weight.; In these cases, the average was taken. ESPN grades are on a 100-point scale.; Sources: "2019 Team Ranking". Rivals.

== Roster ==
2018–19 Delaware Fightin' Blue Hens men's basketball team
Players
Coaches

Pos.	#	Name	Height	Weight	Year	Previous school	Hometown
G	0	Ryan Allen	6 ft 2 in (1.88 m)	195 lb (88 kg)	So	DeMatha Catholic HS	Bowie, Maryland
G	1	Kevin Anderson	6 ft 5 in (1.96 m)	180 lb (82 kg)	So	St. John Neumann HS	Williamsport, Pennsylvania
G	2	Curtis Lochner (W)	5 ft 10 in (1.78 m)	175 lb (79 kg)	Sr	Abington HS	Willow Grove, Pennsylvania
G	3	Nate Darling (redshirt)	6 ft 5 in (1.96 m)	190 lb (86 kg)	Jr	DeMatha Catholic HS; UAB	Halifax, Nova Scotia
G	4	Darian Bryant	6 ft 4 in (1.93 m)	220 lb (100 kg)	RS Sr	St. John's College HS; George Washington	Bowie, Maryland
F	5	Eric Carter	6 ft 9 in (2.06 m)	235 lb (107 kg)	RS Sr	Jackson Memorial HS	Jackson, New Jersey
G	10	Connor Rufo (W)	6 ft 3 in (1.91 m)	190 lb (86 kg)	So	Sanford School	Hockessin, Delaware
F	11	Chyree Walker	6 ft 5 in (1.96 m)	195 lb (88 kg)	So	Bullis School	Fairfax, Virginia
G	12	Ithiel Horton	6 ft 3 in (1.91 m)	180 lb (82 kg)	Fr	Roselle Catholic HS	Vauxhall, New Jersey
G	13	Ryan Johnson	6 ft 5 in (1.96 m)	190 lb (86 kg)	RS Sr	New Hope Christian Academy; Mercer	Greensboro, North Carolina
F	15	Aleks Navakovich	6 ft 9 in (2.06 m)	195 lb (88 kg)	Fr	Hobart HS/Don Bosco Institute	Hobart, Indiana
F	22	Jacob Cushing	6 ft 8 in (2.03 m)	210 lb (95 kg)	Jr	Neuqua Valley HS	Naperville, Illinois
G	23	Davis Long (W)	6 ft 2 in (1.88 m)	165 lb (75 kg)	Fr	Sherwood HS	Brookeville, Maryland
F	25	Justyn Mutts (redshirt)	6 ft 7 in (2.01 m)	220 lb (100 kg)	So	St. Augustine Prep; High Point	Millville, New Jersey
F	32	Matt Veretto	6 ft 7 in (2.01 m)	190 lb (86 kg)	Fr	East Catholic HS	Manchester, Connecticut
F	33	Collin Goss	6 ft 11 in (2.11 m)	225 lb (102 kg)	RS Jr	St. Stephen's & St. Agnes School; George Washington	Manassas, Virginia

Head coach

- Martin Ingelsby (Notre Dame)

Assistant coach(es)

- Bill Phillips (St. Joseph's)
- Corey McCrae (Fordham)
- Torrian Jones (Notre Dame)

Legend

- (C) Team captain
- (S) Suspended
- (I) Ineligible
- (W) Walk-on
- Injured
- Current redshirt

Roster
Last update: August 30, 2018

== Schedule and results ==
Date time, TV	Rank^{#}	Opponent^{#}	Result	Record	Site (attendance) city, state
Non-conference regular season
November 6, 2018*; 7:30 pm, BTN Plus		at Maryland	L 67–73	0–1	Xfinity Center (12,703); College Park, MD
November 10, 2018*; 6:00 pm		at Saint Peter's	W 78–75 ^{OT}	1–1	Yanitelli Center (752); Jersey City, NJ
November 13, 2018*; 7:00 pm		Chestnut Hill; Delaware Invitational	W 100–62	2–1	Bob Carpenter Center (1,714); Newark, DE
November 15, 2018*; 7:00 pm		at Cornell	W 73–56	3–1	Newman Arena (463); Ithaca, NY
November 18, 2018*; 2:00 pm		Wilmington; Delaware Invitational	W 70–40	4–1	Bob Carpenter Center (1,656); Newark, DE
November 23, 2018*; 7:00 pm		UNC Greensboro; Delaware Invitational	L 65–84	4–2	Bob Carpenter Center (1,556); Newark, DE
November 26, 2018*; 7:00 pm		Louisiana Tech; Delaware Invitational	W 75–71	5–2	Bob Carpenter Center (1,624); Newark, DE
November 30, 2018*; 7:00 pm		at Maryland Eastern Shore	W 71–62	6–2	Hytche Athletic Center (1,428); Princess Anne, MD
December 2, 2018*; 2:00 pm		at Columbia	W 87–86 ^{OT}	7–2	Levien Gymnasium (1,125); New York City, NY
December 5, 2018*; 7:00 pm		Navy	L 65–80	7–3	Bob Carpenter Center (1,927); Newark, DE
December 9, 2018*; 2:00 pm		Saint Francis (PA)	W 88–83	8–3	Bob Carpenter Center (1,933); Newark, DE
December 16, 2018*; 2:00 pm		at Stony Brook	L 68–74	8–4	Island Federal Credit Union Arena (2,435); Stony Brook, NY
December 19, 2018*; 7:00 pm		Delaware State; Route 1 Rivalry	L 71–73	8–5	Bob Carpenter Center (1,533); Newark, DE
CAA regular season
December 28, 2018; 7:00 pm		at Hofstra	L 46–91	8–6 (0–1)	Mack Sports Complex (1,502); Hempstead, NY
December 30, 2018; 4:00 pm		at Northeastern	W 82–80	9–6 (1–1)	Matthews Arena (760); Boston, MA
January 3, 2019; 7:00 pm		William & Mary	W 58–56	10–6 (2–1)	Bob Carpenter Center (1,601); Newark, DE
January 5, 2019; 7:00 pm		Elon	W 77–65	11–6 (3–1)	Bob Carpenter Center (1,832); Newark, DE
January 10, 2019; 7:00 pm		at UNC Wilmington	W 82–69	12–6 (4–1)	Trask Coliseum (3,741); Wilmington, NC
January 12, 2019; 4:00 pm		at College of Charleston	L 58–71	12–7 (4–2)	TD Arena (4,320); Charleston, SC
January 17, 2019; 7:00 pm		James Madison	W 76–69	13–7 (5–2)	Bob Carpenter Center (1,741); Newark, DE
January 19, 2019; 7:00 pm		Towson	L 63–64	13–8 (5–3)	Bob Carpenter Center (2,309); Newark, DE
January 26, 2019; 2:00 pm		Drexel	W 76–75	14–8 (6–3)	Bob Carpenter Center (3,045); Newark, DE
January 31, 2019; 7:00 pm		at Elon	L 56–57	14–9 (6–4)	Schar Center (1,304); Elon, NC
February 2, 2019; 4:00 pm		at William & Mary	L 63–84	14–10 (6–5)	Kaplan Arena (4,611); Williamsburg, VA
February 7, 2019; 7:00 pm		College of Charleston	L 75–83	14–11 (6–6)	Bob Carpenter Center (1,726); Newark, DE
February 9, 2019; 7:00 pm		UNC Wilmington	W 70–66	15–11 (7–6)	Bob Carpenter Center (2,268); Newark, DE
February 14, 2019; 7:00 pm		at Towson	W 78–71 ^{2OT}	16–11 (8–6)	SECU Arena (1,333); Towson, MD
February 16, 2019; 8:00 pm		at James Madison	L 61–68	16–12 (8–7)	JMU Convocation Center (3,233); Harrisonburg, VA
February 23, 2019; 5:00 pm		at Drexel	L 60–68	16–13 (8–8)	Daskalakis Athletic Center (1,744); Philadelphia, PA
February 28, 2019; 7:00 pm		Northeastern	L 64–75	16–14 (8–9)	Bob Carpenter Center (2,157); Newark, DE
March 2, 2019; 4:00 pm		Hofstra	L 70–92	16–15 (8–10)	Bob Carpenter Center (3,816); Newark, DE
CAA tournament
March 10, 2019; 2:30 pm, CAA.tv	(5)	vs. (4) William & Mary; Quarterfinals	W 85–79	17–15	North Charleston Coliseum; North Charleston, SC
March 11, 2019; 6:00 pm, CBSSN	(5)	vs. (1) Hofstra; Semifinals	L 74–78 ^{OT}	17–16	North Charleston Coliseum; North Charleston, SC
*Non-conference game. ^{#}Rankings from AP Poll. (#) Tournament seedings in parentheses. All times are in Eastern Time.
