= 2018–19 Elon Phoenix men's basketball team =

American college basketball season

2018–19 Elon Phoenix men's basketball
- Conference: Colonial Athletic Association
- Record: 11-20 (7-11 CAA)
- Head coach: Matt Matheny (10th season)
- Assistant coaches: Jack Wooten; Chris Long; J.B. Tanner
- Home arena: Schar Center

2018–19 CAA men's basketball standings
	Conf.				Overall
Team	W		L	PCT	W		L	PCT
Hofstra	15	–	3	.833	27	–	8	.771
Northeastern †	14	–	4	.778	23	–	11	.676
Charleston	12	–	6	.667	24	–	9	.727
William & Mary	10	–	8	.556	14	–	17	.452
Delaware	8	–	10	.444	17	–	16	.515
Drexel	7	–	11	.389	13	–	19	.406
Elon	7	–	11	.389	11	–	21	.344
James Madison	6	–	12	.333	14	–	19	.424
Towson	6	–	12	.333	10	–	22	.313
UNC Wilmington	5	–	13	.278	10	–	23	.303
† 2019 CAA tournament winner

The 2018–19 Elon Phoenix men's basketball team represented Elon University during the 2018–19 NCAA Division I men's basketball season. The Phoenix, led by tenth-year head coach Matt Matheny, played as fifth-year members of the Colonial Athletic Association and played their home games at the brand new Schar Center.

== Previous season ==
The Phoenix finished the 2017–18 season 14–18, 6–12 in CAA play to finish in a four-way tie for seventh place. They lost in the first round of the CAA tournament to Delaware.

This was the final season that Elon played their home games at Alumni Gym.

== Offseason ==
=== Departures ===
Name	Number	Pos.	Height	Weight	Year	Hometown	Reason for departure
Brian Dawkins	00	F	6'8"	240	RS Senior	Jacksonville, FL	Graduated
Dmitri Thompson	2	G	6'4"	205	Senior	Orlando, FL	Graduated
Collin Luther	4	G/F	6'6"	220	Senior	Pittsburgh, PA	Graduated
Jack Anton	14	F	6'8"	235	Senior	Mason, OH	Graduated

=== 2018 recruiting class ===
College recruiting information
Name	Hometown	School	Height	Weight	Commit date
Kris Wooten; PG	Kinston, NC	Arendell Parrott Academy	6 ft 0 in (1.83 m)	180 lb (82 kg)	Oct 21, 2017
Kris Wooten; PG	Recruit ratings: Scout: Rivals: ESPN: (NR)				
Andy Pack; SG	Greensboro, NC	Northern Guilford High School	6 ft 4 in (1.93 m)	200 lb (91 kg)	Dec 8, 2016
Andy Pack; SG	Recruit ratings: Scout: Rivals: ESPN: (NR)				
Chuck Hannah; PF	Northfield, MA	Northfield Mount Hermon High School	6 ft 7 in (2.01 m)	225 lb (102 kg)	Feb 13, 2017
Chuck Hannah; PF	Recruit ratings: Scout: Rivals: ESPN: (NR)				
Overall recruit ranking:
Note: In many cases, Scout, Rivals, 247Sports, On3, and ESPN may conflict in their listings of height and weight.; In these cases, the average was taken. ESPN grades are on a 100-point scale.; Sources: "Elon". ESPN.; "2018 Team Ranking". Rivals.

== Roster ==
2018–19 Elon Phoenix men's basketball team
Players
Coaches

Pos.	#	Name	Height	Weight	Year	Previous school	Hometown
G	0	Kris Wooten	6 ft 3 in (1.91 m)	190 lb (86 kg)	Fr	Arendell Parrott Academy	Kinston, NC
F	1	Chuck Hannah	6 ft 6 in (1.98 m)	230 lb (104 kg)	Fr	Northfield Mount Hermon School	Boston, MA
G	3	Seth Fuller	5 ft 11 in (1.8 m)	180 lb (82 kg)	RS So	Dublin Coffman HS	Dublin, OH
F	5	Federico Poser	6 ft 8 in (2.03 m)	230 lb (104 kg)	Fr	I.I.S.S. Marco Fanno School	Mareno di Piave, Italy
F/C	10	Karolis Kundrotas	6 ft 11 in (2.11 m)	240 lb (109 kg)	Sr	Barking Abbey School	Kaunas, Lithuania
G	11	Maxwell Chester	6 ft 1 in (1.85 m)	190 lb (86 kg)	Jr	Woodward Academy	Atlanta, GA
G	12	Nathan Priddy	6 ft 2 in (1.88 m)	185 lb (84 kg)	So	Argyle HS	Argyle, TX
G	13	Dainan Swoope	6 ft 0 in (1.83 m)	185 lb (84 kg)	Sr	Sunrise Christian Academy	Overland Park, KS
G	15	Christian Scott	6 ft 1 in (1.85 m)	170 lb (77 kg)	So	St. Andrew's Episcopal School	New Orleans, LA
G	20	Sheldon Eberhardt	6 ft 5 in (1.96 m)	190 lb (86 kg)	Sr	Middle Creek HS	Apex, NC
G	21	Andy Pack	6 ft 4 in (1.93 m)	200 lb (91 kg)	Fr	Northern Guilford HS	Summerfield, NC
G	22	Steven Santa Ana	6 ft 4 in (1.93 m)	190 lb (86 kg)	Sr	Ardrey Kell HS	Charlotte, NC
F	33	Simon Wright	6 ft 7 in (2.01 m)	215 lb (98 kg)	So	Hopkins HS	Minneapolis, MN
F	41	Tyler Seibring	6 ft 9 in (2.06 m)	225 lb (102 kg)	Sr	Normal Community HS	Normal, IL
F/C	41	Duje Radja	6 ft 8 in (2.03 m)	235 lb (107 kg)	So	Kimball Union Academy	Split, Croatia

Head coach

- Matt Matheny (Davidson)

Assistant coach(es)

- Jack Wooten (North Carolina)
- Chris Long (Elon)
- J.B. Tanner (North Carolina)

Legend

- (C) Team captain
- (S) Suspended
- (I) Ineligible
- (W) Walk-on
- Injured
- Current redshirt

Roster
Last update: September 6, 2018

== Schedule and results ==
Date time, TV	Rank^{#}	Opponent^{#}	Result	Record	Site (attendance) city, state
Exhibition
October 30, 2018*; 7:00 pm		Randolph	W 98–45		Schar Center; Elon, NC
Non-conference regular season
November 6, 2018*; 8:30 pm		at Manhattan	W 62–56	1–0	Draddy Gymnasium (937); Riverdale, NY
November 9, 2018*; 7:00 pm, ESPNU		No. 8 North Carolina	L 67–116	1–1	Schar Center (5,245); Elon, NC
November 15, 2018*; 7:00 pm		Milligan	W 98–71	2–1	Schar Center (1,107); Elon, NC
November 22, 2018*; 6:00 pm		vs. Abilene Christian; Pacific Classic	L 56-72	2-2	Alex G. Spanos Center; Stockton, CA
November 23, 2018*; 8:30 pm		vs. UC Riverside; Pacific Classic	L 64-77	2-3	Alex G. Spanos Center; Stockton, CA
November 24, 2018*; 8:30 pm		at Pacific; Pacific Classic	L 57-65	2-4	Alex G. Spanos Center (1,630); Stockton, CA
November 27, 2018*; 7:00 pm		Central Penn	W 92-59	3-4	Schar Center (1,033); Elon, NC
December 1, 2018*; 2:00 pm		Boston University	L 58-65	3-5	Schar Center (1,478); Elon, NC
December 4, 2018*; 7:00 pm		No. 25 Furman	L 77-98	3-6	Schar Center (2,017); Elon, NC
December 7, 2018*; 7:00 pm		UNC Greensboro	L 74-75	3-7	Schar Center (2,231); Elon, NC
December 16, 2018*; 2:00 pm		Canisius	L 91-92	3-8	Schar Center (1,497); Elon, NC
December 18, 2018*; 7:00 pm		Kennesaw State	W 76-67	4-8	KSU Convocation Center (564); Kennesaw, GA
December 22, 2018*; 2:00 pm		at UMKC	W 95-59	4-9	Municipal Auditorium (948); Kansas City, MO
CAA regular season
December 28, 2018; 7:00 pm		Towson	W 77-60	4-10 (0-1)	Schar Center (1,292); Elon, NC
December 30, 2018; 4:00 pm		James Madison	W 68-65	5-10 (1-1)	Schar Center (1,607); Elon, NC
January 3, 2019; 7:00 pm		at Drexel	L 65-79	5-11 (1-2)	Daskalakis Athletic Center (502); Philadelphia, PA
January 5, 2019; 7:00 pm		at Delaware	W 77-65	5-12 (1-3)	Bob Carpenter Center (1,832); Newark, DE
January 10, 2019; 7:00 pm		Northeastern	W 81-70 ^{OT}	5-13 (1-4)	Schar Center (1,497); Elon, NC
January 12, 2019; 7:00 pm		Hofstra	L 71-74	5-14 (1-5)	Schar Center (1,490); Elon, NC
January 19, 2019; 4:00 pm		at William & Mary	W 76-71	6-14 (2-5)	Kaplan Arena (3,845); Williamsburg, VA
January 24, 2019; 7:00 pm		at College of Charleston	L 53-72	6-15 (2-6)	TD Arena (3,714); Charleston, SC
January 26, 2019; 4:00 pm		at UNC Wilmington	W 89-82	7-15 (3-6)	Trask Coliseum (4,196); Wilmington, NC
January 31, 2019; 7:00 pm		Delaware	W 57-56	8-15 (4-6)	Schar Center (1,304); Elon, NC
February 2, 2019; 7:00 pm		Drexel	L 63-67	8-16 (4-7)	Schar Center (2,109); Elon, NC
February 7, 2019; 7:00 pm		at Hofstra	L 61-102	8-17 (4-8)	Mack Sports Complex (2,521); Hempstead, NY
February 9, 2019; 4:00 pm		at Northeastern	L 60-72 ^{OT}	8-18 (4-9)	Matthews Arena (1,264); Boston, MA
February 16, 2019; 7:00 pm		William & Mary	L 74-84	8-19 (4-10)	Schar Center (2,651); Elon, NC
February 21, 2019; 7:00 pm		UNC Wilmington	W 84-77	9-19 (5-10)	Schar Center (1,958); Elon, NC
February 23, 2019; 7:00 pm		College of Charleston	L 74-84	9-20 (5-11)	Schar Center (3,623); Elon, NC
February 28, 2019; 7:00 pm		at James Madison	W 73-58	10-20 (6-11)	JMU Convocation Center (2,240); Harrisonburg, VA
March 2, 2019; 2:00 pm		at Towson	W 86-66	11-20 (7-11)	SECU Arena (1,534); Towson, MD
CAA tournament
March 9, 2019; 6:30 pm	(7)	vs. (10) UNC Wilmington; First round	L 86-93	11-21	North Charleston Coliseum (2,578); North Charleston, SC
*Non-conference game. ^{#}Rankings from AP Poll. (#) Tournament seedings in parentheses. All times are in Eastern Time.
