= 2018–19 UNC Wilmington Seahawks men's basketball team =

American college basketball season

2018–19 UNC Wilmington Seahawks men's basketball
- Conference: Colonial Athletic Association
- Record: 10–23 (5–13 CAA)
- Head coach: C. B. McGrath (2nd season)
- Assistant coaches: Doug Esleeck; Jackie Manuel; Rob Burke
- Home arena: Trask Coliseum

2018–19 CAA men's basketball standings
	Conf.				Overall
Team	W		L	PCT	W		L	PCT
Hofstra	15	–	3	.833	27	–	8	.771
Northeastern †	14	–	4	.778	23	–	11	.676
Charleston	12	–	6	.667	24	–	9	.727
William & Mary	10	–	8	.556	14	–	17	.452
Delaware	8	–	10	.444	17	–	16	.515
Drexel	7	–	11	.389	13	–	19	.406
Elon	7	–	11	.389	11	–	21	.344
James Madison	6	–	12	.333	14	–	19	.424
Towson	6	–	12	.333	10	–	22	.313
UNC Wilmington	5	–	13	.278	10	–	23	.303
† 2019 CAA tournament winner

The 2018–19 UNC Wilmington Seahawks men's basketball team represented the University of North Carolina at Wilmington during the 2018–19 NCAA Division I men's basketball season. The Seahawks, led by second-year head coach C. B. McGrath, played their home games at the Trask Coliseum as members of the Colonial Athletic Association (CAA). They finished the season with an overall record of 10–23, and 5–13 in CAA play to finish in last place.

== Previous season ==
The Seahawks finished the 2017–18 season 11–21, 7–11 in CAA play, to finish in sixth place. They defeated Hofstra in the quarterfinals of the CAA tournament before losing in the semifinals to Northeastern.

== Offseason ==
=== Departures ===
Name	Number	Pos.	Height	Weight	Year	Hometown	Reason for departure
JaQuel Richmond	3	G	6'2"	175	RS Junior	Greensboro, NC	Dismissed from team
Jordan Talley	4	G	6'1"	180	Senior	Richmond, VA	Graduated
Nick Powell	14	G	6'6"	200	Senior	Greensboro, NC	Graduated
Marcus Bryan	30	F	6'7"	242	RS Senior	Raleigh, NC	Graduated

=== Incoming transfers ===
Name	Number	Pos.	Height	Weight	Year	Hometown	Previous school
Ty Gadsden	0	G	6'1"	170	Sophomore	Charlotte, NC	Vincennes
Marten Linssen		F	6'8"	240	Sophomore	Düsseldorf, Germany	Valparaiso

Under NCAA transfer rules, Linssen will have to sit out for the 2018–19 season, and will have three years of remaining eligibility.

=== 2018 recruiting class ===
College recruiting information
Name	Hometown	School	Height	Weight	Commit date
Kai Toews; PG	Tokyo, Japan	Northfield Mount Hermon	6 ft 1 in (1.85 m)	160 lb (73 kg)	Sep 26, 2017
Kai Toews; PG	Recruit ratings: Scout: Rivals: 247Sports: (NR)				
Jaylen Sims; SG	Charlotte, NC	United Faith Christian Academy	6 ft 4 in (1.93 m)	180 lb (82 kg)	Oct 14, 2017
Jaylen Sims; SG	Recruit ratings: Scout: Rivals: 247Sports: (NR)				
Overall recruit ranking:
Note: In many cases, Scout, Rivals, 247Sports, On3, and ESPN may conflict in their listings of height and weight.; In these cases, the average was taken. ESPN grades are on a 100-point scale.; Sources: "2018 Team Ranking". Rivals.

=== 2019 recruiting class ===
College recruiting information (2019)
Name	Hometown	School	Height	Weight	Commit date
Imajae Dodd; PF	Snow Hill, NC	Greene Central High School	6 ft 7 in (2.01 m)	200 lb (91 kg)	Sep 23, 2018
Imajae Dodd; PF	Recruit ratings: Scout: Rivals: (NR)				
Jake Boggs; PF	Charlotte, NC	Carmel Christian School	6 ft 7 in (2.01 m)	N/A	Sep 24, 2018
Jake Boggs; PF	Recruit ratings: Scout: Rivals: (NR)				
Overall recruit ranking:
Note: In many cases, Scout, Rivals, 247Sports, On3, and ESPN may conflict in their listings of height and weight.; In these cases, the average was taken. ESPN grades are on a 100-point scale.; Sources: "2019 Team Ranking". Rivals.

== Roster ==
2018–19 UNC Wilmington Seahawks men's basketball team
Players
Coaches

Pos.	#	Name	Height	Weight	Year	Previous school	Hometown
G	0	Ty Gadsden	6 ft 1 in (1.85 m)	165 lb (75 kg)	So	Arlington Country Day School; Vincennes	Charlotte, NC
G	1	Jaylen Fornes	6 ft 3 in (1.91 m)	210 lb (95 kg)	Jr	Word of God Christian Academy	Pamlico County, NC
F	2	Jeantal Cylla	6 ft 7 in (2.01 m)	215 lb (98 kg)	RS Jr	Lake Worth HS; Florida Atlantic	Lake Worth, FL
F	4	Shawn O'Connell	6 ft 8 in (2.03 m)	205 lb (93 kg)	Sr	Milton HS; Georgia Southern	Roswell, GA
G	5	Jeffrey Gary	6 ft 4 in (1.93 m)	175 lb (79 kg)	So	Sand Creek HS	Austin, TX
G	10	Kai Toews	6 ft 2 in (1.88 m)	180 lb (82 kg)	Fr	Northfield Mount Hermon School	Tokyo, Japan
G	12	Jay Estime	6 ft 5 in (1.96 m)	190 lb (86 kg)	So	Berkmar HS	Lilburn, GA
G	13	Jacque Brown (W)	5 ft 10 in (1.78 m)	150 lb (68 kg)	Sr	East Carteret HS/Cape Fear CC	Beaufort, NC
F	15	Devontae Cacok	6 ft 7 in (2.01 m)	240 lb (109 kg)	Sr	Alpharetta HS	Riverdale, GA
F	20	Matt Elmore	6 ft 9 in (2.06 m)	250 lb (113 kg)	So	Dixon HS	Jacksonville, NC
G	21	Ty Taylor	6 ft 3 in (1.91 m)	170 lb (77 kg)	RS Jr	Hargrave Military Academy/Wichita State	Grandview, MO
G	22	Daniel Etoroma (W)	6 ft 6 in (1.98 m)	220 lb (100 kg)	Jr	Mount Zion Christian Academy	Raleigh, NC
G	30	Jaylen Sims	6 ft 6 in (1.98 m)	190 lb (86 kg)	Fr	United Faith Christian Academy	Charlotte, NC
C	33	Trey Kalina	7 ft 0 in (2.13 m)	264 lb (120 kg)	Sr	North Cobb Christian/Coffeyville CC	Gadsden, AL
F		Marten Linssen (redshirt)	6 ft 8 in (2.03 m)	240 lb (109 kg)	So	Valparaiso	Düsseldorf, Germany

Head coach

- C. B. McGrath (Kansas)

Assistant coach(es)

- Doug Esleek (North Carolina)
- Jackie Manuel (North Carolina)

Legend

- (C) Team captain
- (S) Suspended
- (I) Ineligible
- (W) Walk-on
- Injured
- Current redshirt

Roster
Last update: July 24, 2024

== Schedule and results ==
Date time, TV	Rank^{#}	Opponent^{#}	Result	Record	Site (attendance) city, state
Exhibition
October 27, 2018*; 5:00 p.m.		No. 22 Clemson; Hurricane Florence Relief	L 67–78		Trask Coliseum (4,142); Wilmington, NC
November 2, 2018*; 7:00 p.m.		William Peace	W 80–52		Trask Coliseum (3,868); Wilmington, NC
Non-conference regular season
November 6, 2018*; 7:30 p.m., ESPN+		at Campbell	L 93–97 ^{OT}	0–1	Gore Arena (2,416); Buies Creek, NC
November 9, 2018*; 7:00 p.m.		Stanford	L 59–72	0–2	Trask Coliseum (4,356); Wilmington, NC
November 13, 2018*; 7:00 p.m.		UNC Greensboro	L 61–82	0–3	Trask Coliseum (3,733); Wilmington, NC
November 18, 2018*; 2:00 p.m.		Allen; Battle in the Blue Ridge	W 113–73	1–3	Trask Coliseum (3,622); Wilmington, NC
November 23, 2018*; 7:30 p.m.		vs. Arkansas State; Battle in the Blue Ridge	W 78–64	2–3	U.S. Cellular Center (1,280); Asheville, NC
November 24, 2018*; 7:30 p.m.		vs. Gardner–Webb; Battle in the Blue Ridge	L 72–81	2–4	U.S. Cellular Center (1,250); Asheville, NC
November 25, 2018*; 1:00 p.m.		vs. Eastern Illinois; Battle in the Blue Ridge	W 82–65	3–4	U.S. Cellular Center (1,113); Asheville, NC
November 27, 2018*; 7:00 p.m.		East Carolina	W 95–86	4–4	Trask Coliseum (3,971); Wilmington, NC
December 1, 2018*; 7:00 p.m.		Davidson; A10–CAA Challenge	L 85–91	4–5	Trask Coliseum (4,084); Wilmington, NC
December 5, 2018*; 9:00 p.m., ESPN2		at No. 14 North Carolina	L 69–97	4–6	Dean Smith Center (20,083); Chapel Hill, NC
December 15, 2018*; 4:00 p.m., ESPN+		at No. 23 Furman	L 50–93	4–7	Timmons Arena (2,457); Greenville, SC
December 19, 2018*; 7:00 p.m., ESPN+		at Georgia State	L 71–86	4–8	GSU Sports Arena (1,324); Atlanta, GA
December 21, 2018*; 7:00 p.m., ESPN+		at Mercer	L 73–77	4–9	Hawkins Arena (2,219); Macon, GA
CAA regular season
December 29, 2018; 7:00 p.m.		College of Charleston	W 73–66	4–10 (0–1)	Trask Coliseum (3,748); Wilmington, NC
January 3, 2019; 7:00 p.m.		at James Madison	W 86–83	5–10 (1–1)	JMU Convocation Center (1,922); Harrisonburg, VA
January 5, 2019; 2:00 p.m.		at Towson	W 67–61	6–10 (2–1)	SECU Arena (1,258); Towson, MD
January 10, 2019; 7:00 p.m.		Delaware	L 69–82	6–11 (2–2)	Trask Coliseum (3,741); Wilmington, NC
January 12, 2019; 2:00 p.m.		Drexel	W 97–83	7–11 (3–2)	Trask Coliseum (3,991); Wilmington, NC
January 17, 2019; 7:00 p.m.		at Hofstra	L 72–87	7–12 (3–3)	Mack Sports Complex (1,504); Hempstead, NY
January 19, 2019; 4:00 p.m.		at Northeastern	L 71–88	7–13 (3–4)	Matthews Arena (800); Boston, MA
January 24, 2019; 7:00 p.m.		William & Mary	W 93–88	8–13 (4–4)	Trask Coliseum (3,889); Wilmington, NC
January 26, 2019; 4:00 p.m.		Elon	L 89–92	8–14 (4–5)	Trask Coliseum (4,196); Wilmington, NC
January 31, 2019; 7:00 p.m.		Towson	L 76–77	8–15 (4–6)	Trask Coliseum (3,570); Wilmington, NC
February 2, 2019; 7:00 p.m.		James Madison	L 95–104	8–16 (4–7)	Trask Coliseum (4,841); Wilmington, NC
February 7, 2019; 7:00 p.m.		at Drexel	L 57–69	8–17 (4–8)	Daskalakis Athletic Center (917); Philadelphia, PA
February 9, 2019; 7:00 p.m.		at Delaware	L 66–70	8–18 (4–9)	Bob Carpenter Center (2,268); Newark, DE
February 14, 2019; 7:00 p.m.		Northeastern	L 77–81	8–19 (4–10)	Trask Coliseum (3,482); Wilmington, NC
February 16, 2019; 7:00 p.m.		Hofstra	W 87–79	9–19 (5–10)	Trask Coliseum (4,250); Wilmington, NC
February 21, 2019; 7:00 p.m.		at Elon	L 77–84	9–20 (5–11)	Schar Center (1,958); Elon, NC
February 23, 2019; 4:00 p.m.		at William & Mary	L 63–71	9–21 (5–12)	Kaplan Arena (3,836); Williamsburg, VA
March 2, 2019; 4:00 p.m.		at College of Charleston	L 61–70	9–22 (5–13)	TD Arena (4,898); Charleston, SC
CAA tournament
March 9, 2019; 6:30 p.m., CAA.tv	(10)	vs. (7) Elon; First round	W 93–86	10–22	North Charleston Coliseum (2,578); North Charleston, SC
March 10, 2019; 6:00 p.m., CAA.tv	(10)	vs. (2) Northeastern; Quarterfinals	L 59–80	10–23	North Charleston Coliseum; North Charleston, SC
*Non-conference game. ^{#}Rankings from AP poll. (#) Tournament seedings in parentheses. All times are in Eastern.
