= 2018–19 Towson Tigers men's basketball team =

American college basketball season

2018–19 Towson Tigers men's basketball
- Conference: Colonial Athletic Association
- Record: 10–22 (6–12 CAA)
- Head coach: Pat Skerry (8th season)
- Assistant coaches: Kevin Clark; Pat O'Connell; Branden McDonald
- Home arena: SECU Arena

2018–19 CAA men's basketball standings
	Conf.				Overall
Team	W		L	PCT	W		L	PCT
Hofstra	15	–	3	.833	27	–	8	.771
Northeastern †	14	–	4	.778	23	–	11	.676
Charleston	12	–	6	.667	24	–	9	.727
William & Mary	10	–	8	.556	14	–	17	.452
Delaware	8	–	10	.444	17	–	16	.515
Drexel	7	–	11	.389	13	–	19	.406
Elon	7	–	11	.389	11	–	21	.344
James Madison	6	–	12	.333	14	–	19	.424
Towson	6	–	12	.333	10	–	22	.313
UNC Wilmington	5	–	13	.278	10	–	23	.303
† 2019 CAA tournament winner

The 2018–19 Towson Tigers men's basketball team represented Towson University during the 2018–19 NCAA Division I men's basketball season. The Tigers, led by eighth-year head coach Pat Skerry, played their home games at the SECU Arena in Towson, Maryland as members of the Colonial Athletic Association. They finished the season 10–22 overall, 6–12 during CAA play to finish in a tie for eighth place. Awarded the No. 9 seed in the CAA tournament, they lost to No. 8 seed James Madison 73–74 in the first round.

== Previous season ==
The Tigers finished the 2017–18 season 18–14, 8–10 in CAA play to finish in fifth place. They lost in the quarterfinals of the CAA tournament to William & Mary.

== Offseason ==
=== Departures ===
Name	Number	Pos.	Height	Weight	Year	Hometown	Reason for departure
Zane Martin	0	G	6'4"	205	Sophomore	Philadelphia, PA	Transferred to New Mexico
Travis Ingram	1	G	6'3"	177	Freshman	Suffolk, VA	Signed to Chicago Ballers
Deshaun Morman	3	G	6'3"	190	RS Senior	Richmond, VA	Graduated
Justin Gorham	4	F	6'7"	230	Sophomore	Baltimore, MD	Transferred to Houston
Jeffery Prophete	5	G	6'2"	185	Freshman	Sunrise, FL	Transferred to Hillsborough CC
Van Rolle	12	G	6'1"	175	Senior	Edgewood, MD	Graduated
Brian Starr	22	G	6'3"	185	Senior	Kansas City, MO	Graduated
Mike Morsell	23	G	6'5"	210	Senior	Fort Washington, MD	Graduated
Eddie Keith II	33	G	6'5"	240	Senior	Orlando, FL	Graduated

=== Incoming transfers ===
Name	Number	Pos.	Height	Weight	Year	Hometown	Previous School
Tobias Howard	0	G	6'1"		Junior	Lithonia, GA	Chipola College
Juwan Gray	12	F	6'8"	190	Junior	Dover, DE	San Diego
Brian Fobbs	23	G	6'4"	195	Junior	Rochester, NY	Genesee CC

- Under NCAA transfer rules, Gray will have to sit out from the 2018–19 season. Will have two years of remaining eligibility.

=== 2018 recruiting class ===
College recruiting information
Name	Hometown	School	Height	Weight	Commit date
Solomon Uyaelunmo #36 C	Miami, FL	Calvary Christian Academy	6 ft 8 in (2.03 m)	220 lb (100 kg)	Sep 21, 2017
Solomon Uyaelunmo #36 C	Recruit ratings: Scout: Rivals: 247Sports: (79)				
Yağızhan Selçuk; PF	Istanbul, Turkey	The Phelps School	6 ft 8 in (2.03 m)	235 lb (107 kg)	May 5, 2018
Yağızhan Selçuk; PF	Recruit ratings: No ratings found				
Nick Timberlake; SG	Braintree, MA	Kimball Union Academy	6 ft 4 in (1.93 m)	190 lb (86 kg)	May 5, 2018
Nick Timberlake; SG	Recruit ratings: No ratings found				
Jakigh Dottin; PG	Cambridge, MA	Cambridge Rindge And Latin	6 ft 2 in (1.88 m)	210 lb (95 kg)	Mar 22, 2018
Jakigh Dottin; PG	Recruit ratings: No ratings found				
Allen Betrand; SG	Philadelphia, PA	Roman Catholic High School	6 ft 3 in (1.91 m)	180 lb (82 kg)	Aug 23, 2017
Allen Betrand; SG	Recruit ratings: No ratings found				
Overall recruit ranking:
Note: In many cases, Scout, Rivals, 247Sports, On3, and ESPN may conflict in their listings of height and weight.; In these cases, the average was taken. ESPN grades are on a 100-point scale.; Sources: "2018 Team Ranking". Rivals.

=== 2019 recruiting class ===
College recruiting information (2019)
Name	Hometown	School	Height	Weight	Commit date
Charles Thompson; C	Alexandria, VA	St. Stephen's & St. Agnes School	6 ft 8 in (2.03 m)	225 lb (102 kg)	Aug 18, 2018
Charles Thompson; C	Recruit ratings: Scout: Rivals: (51)				
Overall recruit ranking:
Note: In many cases, Scout, Rivals, 247Sports, On3, and ESPN may conflict in their listings of height and weight.; In these cases, the average was taken. ESPN grades are on a 100-point scale.; Sources: "2019 Team Ranking". Rivals.

== Roster ==
2018–19 Towson Tigers men's basketball team
Players
Coaches

Pos.	#	Name	Height	Weight	Year	Previous school	Hometown
G	0	Tobias Howard	6 ft 2 in (1.88 m)	185 lb (84 kg)	Jr	Chipola College	Lithonia, GA
G	2	Jordan McNeil	6 ft 5 in (1.96 m)	190 lb (86 kg)	RS Sr	Mount St. Joseph HS	Baltimore, Maryland
G	3	Allen Betrand	6 ft 4 in (1.93 m)	180 lb (82 kg)	RS Fr	Roman Catholic HS	Philadelphia, PA
G	5	Jakigh Dottin	6 ft 2 in (1.88 m)	211 lb (96 kg)	Fr	Cambridge Rindge & Latin	Cambridge, MA
F	10	Yagizhan Selcuk	6 ft 7 in (2.01 m)	235 lb (107 kg)	Fr	Phelps School	Istanbul, Turkey
F	11	Dennis Tunstall	6 ft 9 in (2.06 m)	220 lb (100 kg)	RS Jr	Life Center Academy	Willingboro, NJ
F	12	Juwan Gray (redshirt)	6 ft 8 in (2.03 m)	210 lb (95 kg)	Jr	San Diego	Dover, DE
G	13	Quinton Drayton	6 ft 4 in (1.93 m)	206 lb (93 kg)	RS Fr	Bowie HS	Bowie, MD
F	20	Nakye Sanders	6 ft 8 in (2.03 m)	236 lb (107 kg)	RS Jr	Duquesne	Staten Island, NY
F	22	Solomon Uyaelunmo	6 ft 7 in (2.01 m)	229 lb (104 kg)	Fr	Calvary Christian HS	Fort Lauderdale, FL
G	23	Brian Fobbs	6 ft 4 in (1.93 m)	213 lb (97 kg)	Jr	Genesee CC	New York City, NY
G	25	Nicholas Timberlake	6 ft 4 in (1.93 m)	190 lb (86 kg)	Fr	Braintree High School	Braintree, MA
F	44	Alex Thomas	6 ft 9 in (2.06 m)	268 lb (122 kg)	Sr	Coastal Academy	Hawthorne, NJ

Head coach

- Pat Skerry (Tufts)

Assistant coach(es)

- Kevin Clark (Clark)
- Pat O'Connell (Johns Hopkins)
- Branden McDonald (Virginia Union)

Legend

- (C) Team captain
- (S) Suspended
- (I) Ineligible
- (W) Walk-on
- Injured
- Current redshirt

Roster
Last update: August 31, 2018

== Honors and awards ==
=== Street & Smith's Preseason Top Newcomer ===
- Solomon Uyaelunmo

=== Lindy's Preseason Newcomer of the Year ===
- Solomon Uyaelunmo

== Schedule and results ==
Date time, TV	Rank^{#}	Opponent^{#}	Result	Record	Site (attendance) city, state
Non-conference regular season
November 6, 2018*; 7:00 pm, ACCN Extra		at No. 5 Virginia	L 42–73	0–1	John Paul Jones Arena (13,807); Charlottesville, VA
November 11, 2018*; 4:30 pm		Wesley (DE); Bahamas Showcase campus game	W 93–66	1–1	SECU Arena (1,389); Towson, MD
November 16, 2018*; 8:00 pm		vs. Pepperdine; Bahamas Showcase quarterfinals	L 65–74	1–2	Kendal Isaacs National Gymnasium (342); Nassau, BAH
November 17, 2018*; 2:00 pm		vs. Florida Atlantic; Bahamas Showcase consolation	L 71–85	1–3	Kendal Isaacs National Gymnasium (221); Nassau, BAH
November 18, 2018*; 11:0 am		vs. North Dakota State; Bahamas Showcase 7th place game	L 51–76	1–4	Kendal Isaacs National Gymnasium (219); Nassau, BAH
November 25, 2018*; 6:00 pm		Loyola (MD); Battle for Greater Baltimore	W 85–69	2–4	SECU Arena (1,058); Towson, MD
November 30, 2018*; 7:00 pm		Vermont	L 64–70	2–5	SECU Arena (1,458); Towson, MD
December 5, 2018*; 7:00 pm, ESPN+		at George Washington; A10–CAA Challenge	L 64–68	2–6	Charles E. Smith Center (1,915); Washington, D.C.
December 8, 2018*; 1:15 pm		vs. Morgan State; Charm City Classic	L 69–74	2–7	Royal Farms Arena (2,717); Baltimore, MD
December 11, 2018*; 7:00 pm, ESPN+		at UMBC; Battle for Greater Baltimore	W 80–76 ^{2OT}	3–7	UMBC Event Center (2,476); Baltimore, MD
December 21, 2018*; 5:00 pm, FloHoops.com		vs. Tulane; Battle of the Boardwalk semifinals	W 73–55	4–7	Boardwalk Hall; Atlantic City, NJ
December 22, 2018*; 2:30 pm, FloHoops.com		vs. La Salle; Battle of the Boardwalk championship	L 51–57	4–8	Boardwalk Hall; Atlantic City, NJ
CAA regular season
December 28, 2018; 7:00 pm		at Elon	W 77–60	5–8 (1–0)	Schar Center (1,292); Elon, NC
December 30, 2018; 4:00 pm		at William & Mary	L 61–71	5–9 (1–1)	Kaplan Arena (3,346); Williamsburg, VA
January 3, 2019; 7:00 pm		College of Charleston	L 55–67	5–10 (1–2)	SECU Arena (1,058); Towson, MD
January 5, 2019; 2:00 pm		UNC Wilmington	L 61–67	5–11 (1–3)	SECU Arena (1,258); Towson, MD
January 9, 2019*; 7:00 pm		Cornell	L 74–86	5–12 (1–3)	SECU Arena (1,123); Towson, MD
January 12, 2019; 4:00 pm		at James Madison	L 64–75	5–13 (1–4)	JMU Convocation Center (2,559); Harrisonburg, VA
January 17, 2019; 7:00 pm		at Drexel	L 66–72	5–14 (1–5)	Daskalakis Athletic Center (1,191); Philadelphia, PA
January 19, 2019; 7:00 pm, NBCSN/SNY		at Delaware	W 64–63	6–14 (2–5)	Bob Carpenter Center (2,309); Newark, DE
January 24, 2019; 7:00 pm, CBS Digital		Northeastern	W 75–72	7–14 (3–5)	SECU Arena (1,023); Towson, MD
January 26, 2019; 2:00 pm		Hofstra	L 61–84	7–15 (3–6)	SECU Arena (1,604); Towson, MD
January 31, 2019; 7:00 pm		at UNC Wilmington	W 77–76	8–15 (4–6)	Trask Coliseum (3,570); Wilmington, NC
February 2, 2019; 4:00 pm		at College of Charleston	L 53–54	8–16 (4–7)	TD Arena (4,194); Charleston, SC
February 9, 2019; 2:00 pm		James Madison	W 66–59	9–16 (5–7)	SECU Arena (1,531); Towson, MD
February 14, 2019; 7:00 pm, NBCSN		Delaware	L 71–78 ^{2OT}	9–17 (5–8)	SECU Arena (1,333); Towson, MD
February 16, 2019; 2:00 pm		Drexel	W 92–77	10–17 (6–8)	SECU Arena (2,055); Towson, MD
February 21, 2019; 7:00 pm		at Hofstra	L 82–91 ^{2OT}	10–18 (6–9)	Mack Sports Complex (3,587); Hempstead, NY
February 23, 2019; 12:30 pm		at Northeastern	L 58–73	10–19 (6–10)	Matthews Arena (1,432); Boston, MA
February 28, 2019; 7:00 pm		William & Mary	L 65–67	10–20 (6–11)	SECU Arena (1,511); Towson, MD
March 2, 2019; 2:00 pm		Elon	L 66–86	10–21 (6–12)	SECU Arena (1,534); Towson, MD
CAA tournament
March 9, 2019; 4:00 pm, CAA.tv	(9)	vs. (8) James Madison; First round	L 73–74	10–22	North Charleston Coliseum; North Charleston, SC
*Non-conference game. ^{#}Rankings from AP. (#) Tournament seedings in parentheses. All times are in Eastern Time.
