= 2018–19 Colonial Athletic Association men's basketball season =

- League: NCAA Division I
- Sport: Basketball
- Duration: November, 2018 – March, 2019
- Teams: 10

Regular Season
- Season champions: Hofstra
- Runners-up: Northeastern
- Season MVP: Justin Wright-Foreman (Hofstra)
- Top scorer: Justin Wright-Foreman (Hofstra)

Tournament
- Champions: Northeastern
- Runners-up: Hofstra
- Finals MVP: Vasa Pusica (Northeastern)

CAA men's basketball seasons
- ← 2017–18 2019–20 →

2018–19 CAA men's basketball standings
	Conf.				Overall
Team	W		L	PCT	W		L	PCT
Hofstra	15	–	3	.833	27	–	8	.771
Northeastern †	14	–	4	.778	23	–	11	.676
Charleston	12	–	6	.667	24	–	9	.727
William & Mary	10	–	8	.556	14	–	17	.452
Delaware	8	–	10	.444	17	–	16	.515
Drexel	7	–	11	.389	13	–	19	.406
Elon	7	–	11	.389	11	–	21	.344
James Madison	6	–	12	.333	14	–	19	.424
Towson	6	–	12	.333	10	–	22	.313
UNC Wilmington	5	–	13	.278	10	–	23	.303
† 2019 CAA tournament winner

The 2018–19 CAA men's basketball season marked the 34th season of Colonial Athletic Association basketball, taking place between November 2018 and March 2019. Practices commenced in October 2018, and the season ended with the 2019 CAA men's basketball tournament.

== Head coaches ==
=== Coaching changes ===
There were no coaching changes following the 2017–18 season.

=== Coaches ===
Team	Head coach	Previous job	Year at school	Overall record	CAA record	CAA championships	NCAA Tournaments
College of Charleston	Earl Grant	Clemson (asst.)	5	77–56	39–33	1	1
Delaware	Martin Ingelsby	Notre Dame (asst.)	3	27–39	11–25	0	0
Drexel	Zach Spiker	Army	3	22–43	9–27	0	0
Elon	Matt Matheny	Davidson (asst.)	10	140–148	72–88	0	0
Hofstra	Joe Mihalich	Niagara	6	88–76	48–40	0	0
James Madison	Louis Rowe	Bowling Green (asst.)	3	20–45	13–23	0	0
Northeastern	Bill Coen	Boston College (asst.)	13	201–186	123–91	1	1
Towson	Pat Skerry	Pittsburgh (asst.)	8	114–115	62–62	0	0
UNC Wilmington	C.B. McGrath	North Carolina (asst.)	2	11–21	7–11	0	0
William & Mary	Tony Shaver	Hampden-Sydney College	16	212–251	121–160	0	0

Notes:

- All records, appearances, titles, etc. are from time with current school only.
- Year at school includes 2018–19 season.
- Overall and CAA records are from time at current school and are through the end of the 2017–18 season.

== Preseason ==
=== Preseason poll ===
Rank	Team
1	Northeastern (35)
2	College of Charleston (5)
3	Hofstra
4	William & Mary
5	UNC Wilmington
6	James Madison
7	Delaware
8	Elon
9	Drexel
10	Towson

() first place votes

=== Preseason All-Conference Teams ===
Award	Recipients
First Team	Jarrell Brantley (Charleston); Devontae Cacok (UNCW); Vasa Pusica (Northeastern); Grant Riller (Charleston); Justin Wright-Foreman (Hofstra)
Second Team	Nathan Knight (William & Mary); Stuckey Mosely (James Madison); Eli Pemberton (Hofstra); Justin Pierce (William & Mary); Tyler Seibring (Elon)
Honorable Mention	Ryan Allen (Delaware); Eric Carter (Delaware); Kurk Lee (Drexel); Matt Lewis (James Madison); Shawn Occeus (Northeastern)

Colonial Athletic Association Preseason Player of the Year: Justin Wright-Foreman (Hofstra)

== Regular season ==
=== Rankings ===
Legend
Increase in ranking
Decrease in ranking
Not ranked previous week

		Pre	Wk 2	Wk 3	Wk 4	Wk 5	Wk 6	Wk 7	Wk 8	Wk 9	Wk 10	Wk 11	Wk 12	Wk 13	Wk 14	Wk 15	Wk 16	Wk 17	Wk 18	Wk 19	Final
College of Charleston	AP																				
College of Charleston	C																				
Delaware	AP																				
Delaware	C																				
Drexel	AP																				
Drexel	C																				
Elon	AP																				
Elon	C																				
Hofstra	AP												RV	RV							
Hofstra	C													RV	RV	RV	RV	RV	RV	RV	
James Madison	AP																				
James Madison	C																				
Northeastern	AP																				
Northeastern	C																				
Towson	AP																				
Towson	C																				
UNC Wilmington	AP																				
UNC Wilmington	C																				
William & Mary	AP																				
William & Mary	C																				

=== Conference matrix ===
This table summarizes the head-to-head results between teams in conference play.

	Charleston	Delaware	Drexel	Elon	Hofstra	James Madison	Northeastern	Towson	UNC Wilmington	William & Mary
vs. Charleston	–	0–2	1–1	0–2	2–0	1–1	1–1	0–2	0–2	1–1
vs. Delaware	2–0	–	1–1	1–1	2–0	1–1	1–1	1–1	0–2	1–1
vs. Drexel	1–1	1–1	–	0–2	2–0	1–1	2–0	1–1	1–1	2–0
vs. Elon	2–0	1–1	2–0	–	2–0	0–2	2–0	1–1	0–2	1–1
vs. Hofstra	0–2	0–2	0–2	0–2	–	1–1	1–1	0–2	1–1	0–2
vs. James Madison	1–1	1–1	1–1	2–0	1–1	–	2–0	1–1	1–1	2–0
vs. Northeastern	1–1	1–1	0–2	0–2	1–1	0–2	–	1–1	0–2	0–2
vs. Towson	2–0	1–1	1–1	1–1	2–0	1–1	1–1	–	1–1	2–0
vs. UNC Wilmington	2–0	2–0	1–1	2–0	1–1	1–1	2–0	1–1	–	1–1
vs. William & Mary	1–1	1–1	0–2	1–1	2–0	0–2	2–0	0–2	1–1	–
Total	12–6	8–10	7–11	7–11	15–3	6–12	14–4	6–12	5–13	10–8

== Postseason ==
=== NCAA tournament ===
The CAA had one bid to the 2019 NCAA Division I men's basketball tournament, that being the automatic bid of Northeastern by winning the conference tournament.

Seed	Region	School	First Four	First Round	Second Round	Sweet 16	Elite Eight	Final Four	Championship
13	Midwest	Northeastern	Bye	Eliminated by (4) Kansas 53–87					
Bids		W-L (%):	0–0 (–)	0–1 (.000)	0–0 (–)	0–0 (–)	0–0 (–)	0–0 (–)	TOTAL: 0–1 (.000)

=== National Invitation tournament ===
Hofstra received an automatic bid to the 2019 National Invitation Tournament by winning as regular season conference champions.

Seed	School	First Round	Second Round	Quarterfinals	Semifinals	Championship
7	Hofstra	Eliminated by (2) NC State 78–84				
Bids	W-L (%):	0–1 (.000)	0–0 (–)	0–0 (–)	0–0 (–)	TOTAL: 0–1 (.000)

== Awards and honors ==
=== Regular season ===
==== CAA Player-of-the-Week ====
- Nov. 12 – Grant Riller (Charleston)
- Nov. 19 – Justin Wright-Foreman (Hofstra)
- Nov. 26 – Grant Riller (Charleston)(2), Justin Wright-Foreman (Hofstra)(2)
- Dec. 3 – Eric Carter (Delaware)
- Dec. 10 – Justin Wright-Foreman (Hofstra)(3)
- Dec. 17 – Jarrell Brantley (Charleston), Brian Fobbs (Towson)
- Dec. 24 – Jarrell Brantley (Charleston)(2)
- Dec. 31 – Justin Wright-Foreman (Hofstra)(4)
- Jan. 7 – Justin Wright-Foreman (Hofstra)(5)
- Jan. 14 – Darius Banks (James Madison), Devontae Cacok (UNCW)
- Jan. 21 – Eli Pemberton (Hofstra), Vasa Pusica (Northeastern)
- Jan. 28 – Justin Wright-Foreman (Hofstra)(6)
- Feb. 4 – Vasa Pusica (Northeastern)(2)
- Feb. 11 – Justin Wright-Foreman (Hofstra)(7)
- Feb. 18 – Nathan Knight (William & Mary), Grant Riller (Charleston)(3)
- Feb. 25 – Matt Lewis (James Madison)
- Mar. 4 – Steven Santa Ana (Elon)

==== CAA Rookie-of-the-Week ====
- Nov. 12 – L.J. Owens (William & Mary)
- Nov. 19 – Camren Wynter (Drexel)
- Nov. 26 – Chase Audige (William & Mary)
- Dec. 3 – Ithiel Horton (Delaware), Kai Toews (UNCW)
- Dec. 10 – Ithiel Horton (Delaware)(2)
- Dec. 17 – Camren Wynter (Drexel)(2)
- Dec. 24 – Kris Wooten (Elon)
- Dec. 31 – Chase Audige (William & Mary)(2)
- Jan. 7 – Kai Toews (UNCW)(2)
- Jan. 14 – Ithiel Horton (Delaware)(3)
- Jan. 21 – Camren Wynter (Drexel)(3)
- Jan. 28 – Kai Toews (UNCW)(3)
- Feb. 4 – Chase Audige (William & Mary)(3)
- Feb. 11 – Camren Wynter (Drexel)(4)
- Feb. 18 – Kai Toews (UNCW)(4)
- Feb. 25 – Camren Wynter (Drexel)(5)
- Mar. 4 – Ithiel Horton (Delaware)(4)

=== Postseason ===
==== CAA All-Conference Teams and Awards ====
Award	Recipients
Player of the Year	Justin Wright-Foreman (Hofstra)
Coach of the Year	Joe Mihalich (Hofstra)
Rookie of the Year	Camren Wynter (Drexel)
Defensive Player of the Year	Desure Buie (Hofstra)
Sixth Man of the Year	Sheldon Eberhardt (Elon)
Dean Ehlers Leadership Award	Paul Rowley (William & Mary)
Scholar-Athlete of the Year	Tyler Seibring (William & Mary)
First Team	Jarrell Brantley (Charleston); Devontae Cacok (UNCW); Nathan Knight (William & Mary); Vasa Pusica (Northeastern); Grant Riller (Charleston); Justin Wright-Foreman (Hofstra)
Second Team	Eric Carter (Delaware); Brian Fobbs (Towson); Stuckey Mosley (James Madison); Eli Pemberton (Hofstra); Tyler Seibring (Elon)
Third Team	Desure Buie (Hofstra); Alihan Demir (Drexel); Troy Harper (Drexel); Matt Lewis (James Madison); Justin Pierce (William & Mary); Jordan Roland (Northeastern)
All-Defensive Team	Desure Buie (Hofstra); Devontae Cacok (UNCW); Nathan Knight (William & Mary); Jacquil Taylor (Hofstra); Dennis Tunstall (Towson)
All-Rookie Team	Chase Audige (William & Mary); Ithiel Horton (Delaware); Deshon Parker (James Madison); Kai Toews (UNCW); Camren Wynter (Drexel)
All-Tournament Team	Jarrell Brantley (Charleston); Ithiel Horton (Delaware); Shawn Occeus (Northeastern); Jacquil Taylor (Hofstra); Justin Wright-Foreman (Hofstra)
Tournament MVP	Vasa Pusica (Northeastern)

== Attendance ==
Team	Arena	Capacity	Game 1	Game 2	Game 3	Game 4	Game 5	Game 6	Game 7	Game 8	Total	Average	% of Capacity
Team	Arena	Capacity	Game 9	Game 10	Game 11	Game 12	Game 13	Game 14	Game 15	Game 16	Total	Average	% of Capacity
Charleston	TD Arena	5,100	3,711	4,276	4,167	4,134	3,987	4,054	4,116	4,320	63,035	4,202	82%
Charleston	TD Arena	5,100	3,714	4,569	3,933	4,194	4,095	4,867	4,898		63,035	4,202	82%
Delaware	Bob Carpenter Center	5,100	1,714	1,656	1,556	1,624	1,927	1,933	1,533	1,601	32,438	2,163	42%
Delaware	Bob Carpenter Center	5,100	1,832	1,741	2,309	3,045	1,726	2,268	2,157	3,816	32,438	2,163	42%
Drexel	Daskalakis Athletic Center	2,509	978	660	828	1,481	894	1,159	502	831	16,846	1,123	45%
Drexel	Daskalakis Athletic Center	2,509	1,191	2,119	917	1,175	1,744	1,019	1,348		16,846	1,123	45%
Elon	Schar Center	5,100	5,245	1,107	1,033	1,478	2,017	2,231	1,497	1,292	32,139	2,009	39%
Elon	Schar Center	5,100	1,607	1,497	1,490	1,304	2,109	2,651	1,958	3,623	32,139	2,009	39%
Hofstra	Hofstra Arena	5,023	4,645	1,209	1,153	1,046	1,547	1,676	1,011	1,502	35,605	2,225	44%
Hofstra	Hofstra Arena	5,023	1,512	1,618	1,504	2,217	2,521	4,208	3,587	4,649	35,605	2,225	44%
James Madison	JMU Convocation Center	6,426	2,623	2,185	1,982	2,314	2,482	1,922	2,224	2,559	34,499	2,464	38%
James Madison	JMU Convocation Center	6,426	2,109	2,728	2,084	3,233	2,240	3,814			34,499	2,464	38%
Northeastern	Matthews Arena	6,000	1,180	1,147	763	2,348	845	760	1,074	800	14,526	1,117	19%
Northeastern	Matthews Arena	6,000	1,208	795	1,264	910	1,432				14,526	1,117	19%
Towson	SECU Arena	5,200	1,389	1,058	1,458	1,058	1,258	1,123	1,023	1,604	17,935	1,380	27%
Towson	SECU Arena	5,200	1,531	1,333	2,055	1,511	1,534				17,935	1,380	27%
UNC Wilmington	Trask Coliseum	5,200	4,356	3,733	3,622	3,971	4,084	3,748	3,741	3,991	55,474	3,962	76%
UNC Wilmington	Trask Coliseum	5,200	3,889	4,196	3,570	4,841	3,482	4,250			55,474	3,962	76%
William & Mary	Kaplan Arena	8,600	3,301	3,370	2,878	3,332	3,140	3,690	3,346	3,176	48,584	3,470	40%
William & Mary	Kaplan Arena	8,600	3,367	3,845	3,034	4,611	3,658	3,836			48,584	3,470	40%
