= North Charleston Coliseum =

Multi-purpose arena in South Carolina, United States

- Casa del Ray; Hockeyharbor, USA

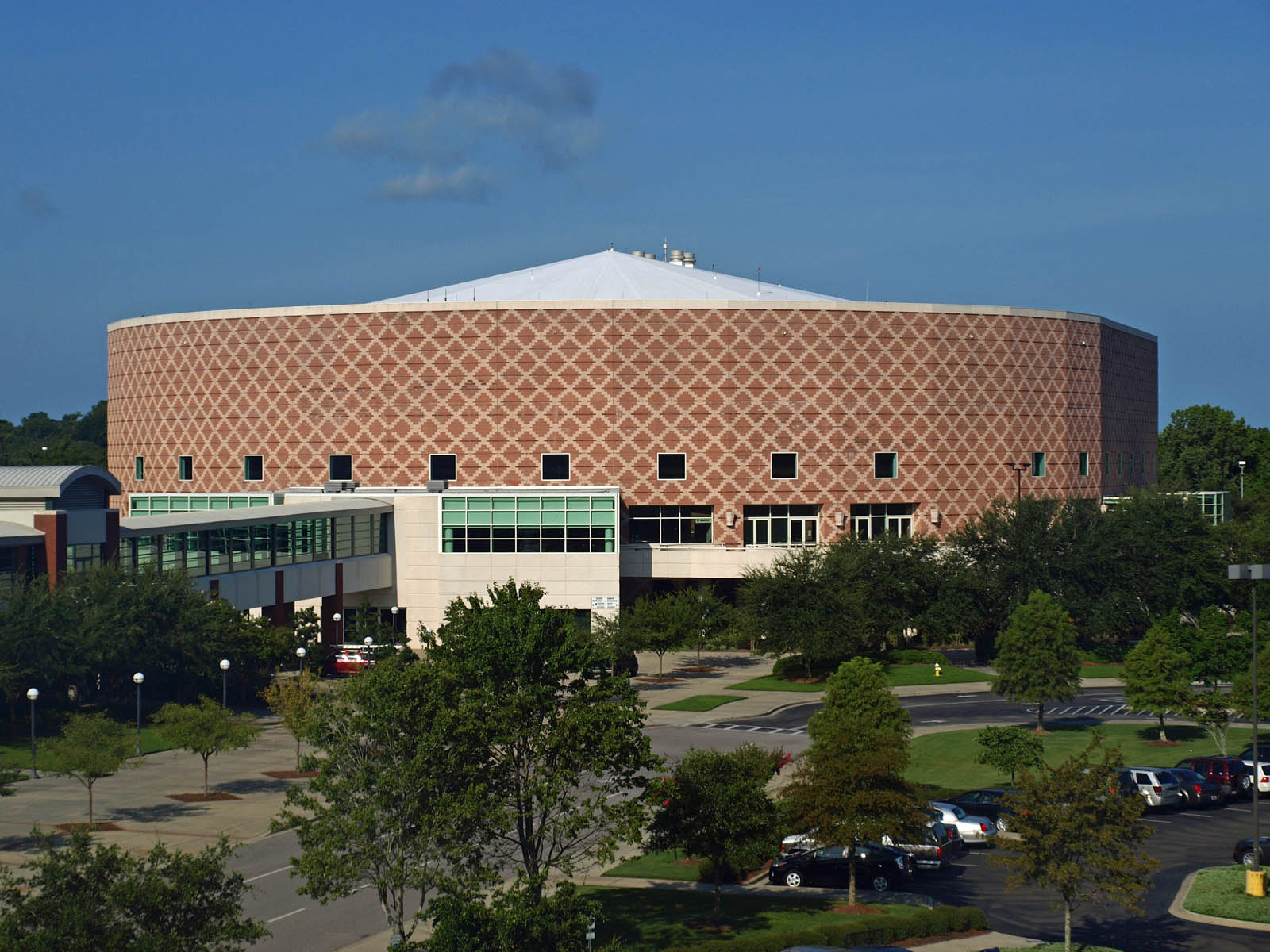
- Exterior of venue (c. 2010)

- Location within South Carolina Location within the United States
- Address: 5001 Coliseum Dr; North Charleston, SC 29418-7914
- Location: Tri-County Area
- Coordinates: 32.8656°N 80.0224°W
- Owner: City of North Charleston
- Operator: ASM Global
- Capacity: 13,000 Detailed capacity: 13,295 (center-stage events); 8,805-12,645 (end-stage events); 11,475 (basketball); 10,537 (hockey, football); 5,970 (half-house events)

Construction
- Groundbreaking: April 29, 1991
- Opened: January 29, 1993 (33 years ago.)
- Renovated: 2010-11; 2014; 2018-19
- Cost: $25 million ($59.1 million in 2025 dollars)
- Architect: Odell Associates
- Structural engineer: Geiger Engineers
- Services engineer: Henderson Engineers
- General contractor: McDevitt & Street Co.

Tenants
- South Carolina Stingrays (ECHL) (1993–present); Charleston Southern Buccaneers (NCAA) (1993–present); Charleston Swamp Foxes (AF2) (2000–03); North Charleston/Charleston Lowgators (NBDL) (2001–04); Charleston Sandsharks (NIFL) (2006)

Website
- Venue Website
- Building details

General information
- Renovated: August 2010-October 2011
- Renovation cost: $21 million ($31 million in 2025 dollars)

Renovating team
- Architect: AECOM-Ellerbe Beckett
- Structural engineer: Geiger Engineers
- Civil engineer: BetschAssociates
- Other designers: Brantley Construction; Thomas & Hutton
- Main contractor: China Construction America

The North Charleston Coliseum is a multi-purpose arena in North Charleston, South Carolina. It is part of the North Charleston Convention Center Complex, which also includes a performing arts center and convention center. It is owned by the City of North Charleston and managed by ASM Global. The coliseum opened in 1993, with the performing arts center and convention center opened in 1999. The complex is located on the access road to the Charleston International Airport.

It is home to the ECHL's South Carolina Stingrays professional ice hockey team and serves as an alternate home for the Charleston Southern University basketball team. It is the area's primary venue for concerts and other major indoor events expected to draw large crowds.

== Tenants ==
The Coliseum is the current home of the South Carolina Stingrays, a minor league professional ice hockey team that plays in the ECHL. When construction first began on the arena there were no plans to include ice-making equipment. However, after an ECHL franchise application for the city of North Charleston had been pre-approved by the league in April 1992, the city council approved the funds required for the installation of an ice surface into the building that was already well under construction. The Stingrays began play there for the 1993–94 ECHL season.

It is the alternate home arena for the Charleston Southern University basketball team. Typically, Charleston Southern University uses the Coliseum for non-conference games that draw audiences greater than their home arena's 798-seat capacity, such as cross-town rivals College of Charleston and The Citadel. Furthermore, its size allows them to play major conference teams such as Virginia Tech at home (some major conference arenas do not seat 10,000). In addition, the North Charleston Coliseum has hosted the Big South Conference (1993–94) and the Southern Conference basketball tournaments.

The Coliseum has previously hosted arena and indoor football teams, as well as a National Basketball Development League team, as well as an all female production of Ben Hur that drew several noise and indecency complaints.

== Events ==
In addition to sporting events, the arena hosts concerts, comedy shows and various other events. The Coliseum has served as the venue for several televised events, to include In Your House 8: Beware of Dog pay-per-view after the Florence Civic Center's infrastructure failed (1996), WCW Uncensored (1997), Shania Twain (2004), WWE Raw (2002, 2005, 2006, 2007, 2013, 2015), PBR Built Ford Tough Series (2006), Wheel of Fortune (2006), and American Idol (2007, 2011) and The X Factor (2013) auditions.

Other major concerts and events have included Kiss playing their final show with the original lineup (2000), where drummer Peter Criss smashed his Drumset as frustration over contract issues, Oprah Winfrey (2006), Walking with Dinosaurs (2008), a CNN Presidential Debate (2012), a Fox Business Presidential Debate (2016), Kid Rock (2008, 2011), Taylor Swift (2009), The Dave Matthews Band (in 1996, and since 2005 & 2016), Kenny Chesney (2011), Jay-Z (2013), Brad Paisley (2011, 2014), Prince (2011). and Trans-Siberian Orchestra's winter concerts and Beethoven's Last Night shows (2004–2012). The Coliseum hosted Metallica in '93 Nowhere Else to Roam Tour, Columbia's Hootie & the Blowfish with Greenville's Edwin McCain in '95, Gainesville's Tom Petty and the Heartbreakers in '95, Athens GA's R.E.M. in '95, Green Day in '95, Macon GA's Allman Brothers Band in '96, Pearl Jam in '96, Stone Temple Pilots in '97, Jay-Z in '99, and N'SYNC in 2000. The Coliseum hosted Ben Folds in '03, Breaking Benjamin with Staind and 3 Doors Down '05, Three Days Grace with Nickelback '07, The Fray '07, Kings of Leon '09, John Mayer '10, Daughtry with Lifehouse '10, Charleston's Darius Rucker in '11, Avril Lavigne '13, Fall Out Boy '16, Impractical Jokers '16, Meghan Trainor '16, Twenty One Pilots '17, The Chainsmokers '17, Ed Sheeran '17, Mumford & Sons '19, Trevor Noah '19, and Five Finger Death Punch in '19. The Beach Boys performed at the North Charleston Performing Arts Center in 2018 for their Reason for the Season Tour.

== History ==
=== Planning and construction ===
Planning for the coliseum began in 1985, when a city-sponsored study determined that the city could support a venue seating 10,000-plus people. In October of that year, the McNair Realty and Development company of Greenville, South Carolina, who owned the 400-acre (160 ha) Centre Pointe development tract, donated 30 acres (12 ha) of that land valued at approximately $100,000 an acre to the city for construction of the coliseum. The coliseum was originally planned to be part of a redevelopment dubbed "City Center," which was to include the coliseum, a convention center, a performing arts center, a transportation hub, a library, an art gallery and museum, an arts school, parking garages, and scenic park areas, and was to have been completed by 2000. As of June 2011, only the coliseum, convention center, and performing arts center have been completed.

In September 1988, the city considered five architectural firms for design and supervision of the coliseum's construction, eventually settling on Odell Associates, Inc. City Council approved a $25 million budget for design and construction of the coliseum and by February 1991 accepted a $19.8 million bid for the construction contract by McDevitt and Street Co. of Charlotte, North Carolina. Construction began on April 29, 1991, with an estimated completion time of 20 months. In September 1992, the City Council approved $879,000 to fund installation of an ice rink in the coliseum, which at that time was scheduled for completion by December 26 of that year. The ECHL Board of Governors met in November 1992 to vote on bringing a hockey franchise (whose application had been pre-approved that April) to the Charleston area. At that meeting, the league approved creation of the expansion franchise for the 1993–94 ECHL season, giving the coliseum its first professional sports team as a tenant.

=== Grand opening ===
The coliseum opened its doors on January 29, 1993, to a capacity crowd with its first event, the World Cup Figure Skating Champions ice skating exhibition. The opening night was plagued by parking issues that resulted in traffic congestion on local roads and up to an hour delay in clearing the parking lots following the show. The following night saw another sellout crowd for a concert featuring country music star Alan Jackson, for which the traffic problems were reduced due to early arrivals and improved traffic direction. The city expedited the expansion of available parking spaces from 4,000 to 5,030 soon after.

=== Accident ===
On November 10, 1997, the 5-ton scoreboard was dropped while it was being lowered, landing on and killing Billie Wayne Garrett, a rodeo volunteer from Columbia. Garrett, a retired security guard, was helping to prepare for the World Finals Rodeo, an event sponsored by the S.C. Law Enforcement Officers Association that raised money for families of officers killed in the line of duty.

Coliseum officials believed the issue was with the board's hoisting mechanism, which was manufactured by a New Jersey company that had recently experienced hoist failures in two of its mechanisms, one resulting in a scoreboard dropping to the floor. The fall also caused a crack in the coliseum floor, but it was repaired and no damage was found to have been done to the piping system that makes ice for the coliseum floor. Garrett's family filed a wrongful death lawsuit against the company that manufactured the scoreboard, the company that had recently inspected and passed the scoreboard, and Ogden Entertainment, the coliseum's managing company. The lawsuit was settled for $3.5 million. An upgraded scoreboard featuring improved video panels and a safer hoisting setup was installed in October 1999. This scoreboard was replaced in 2012 by another video scoreboard, part of a $21 million renovation that saw the addition of two food courts, the largest of which is the 7,400-square-foot (690 m^{2}) Montague Terrace, as well as a new ticket office and upgrades to eight luxury suites.

=== New management ===
In August 2000, Ogden Entertainment—which had managed the coliseum since its opening in 1993—was purchased by Aramark. Aramark urged city officials to transfer management of the coliseum to SMG, of which Aramark was a half owner at the time, in an effort to leverage SMG's entertainment industry connections to bring more concerts to the area. In an effort to bolster attendance at the coliseum, which had been operating at a loss for two years, SMG took over management of the coliseum in late 2001, agreeing to construct a large freestanding marquee visible from Interstate 526 as part of the management contract.

=== Expansion ===
An ambitious expansion project was approved for financing by the city of North Charleston in 2009. The expansion consists of extensions built onto the Coliseum's north and south entrances, increasing concourse space by 20,000 square feet (1,900 m^{2}) and adding up to 40 additional points of sale for concessions. The expansion will allow for renovation of existing suites and upgrades to the Coliseum's sound system, spotlights, and rigging bridges. Construction on the south side extension, dubbed Montague Terrace, commenced in August 2010 with a planned completion date of October 2011. Construction of the north side extension was completed in 2012.

== See also ==
- List of NCAA Division I basketball arenas
