= 2018–19 Conference USA men's basketball season =

- League: NCAA Division I
- Sport: Basketball
- Teams: 14
- TV partner(s): CBS Sports Network, Stadium, beIN Sports, ESPN3

2018–19 NCAA Division I men's basketball season
- Regular season champions: Old Dominion
- Season MVP: B. J. Stith

Tournament
- Champions: Old Dominion

Basketball seasons
- 2017–18 2019–20

2018–19 Conference USA men's basketball standings
	Conf.				Overall
Team	W		L	PCT	W		L	PCT
Old Dominion †	13	–	5	.722	26	–	9	.743
Western Kentucky	11	–	7	.611	20	–	14	.588
Southern Miss	11	–	7	.611	20	–	13	.606
UTSA	11	–	7	.611	17	–	15	.531
UAB	10	–	8	.556	20	–	15	.571
Marshall	11	–	7	.611	23	–	14	.622
FIU	10	–	8	.556	20	–	13	.606
Louisiana Tech	9	–	9	.500	20	–	13	.606
Florida Atlantic	8	–	10	.444	17	–	16	.515
North Texas	8	–	10	.444	21	–	12	.636
Rice	8	–	10	.444	13	–	19	.406
Middle Tennessee	8	–	10	.444	11	–	21	.344
Charlotte	5	–	13	.278	8	–	21	.276
UTEP	3	–	15	.167	8	–	21	.276
† 2019 C-USA tournament winner

The 2018–19 Conference USA men's basketball season began with practices in October 2018, followed by the start of the 2018–19 NCAA Division I men's basketball season in November. Conference play began in late December and concluded in early March.

Old Dominion won the C-USA regular season championship by two games. The conference used a regular season schedule format which the conference hoped will increase NCAA Tournament berths. whereby the 14 teams played each other once with a second game for travel partners in the first seven weeks of C-USA play. After those 14 games, the league standings determined the matchups for the rest of the regular season. The teams were divided into two groups of five (teams in first through fifth place and 6–10) and a group of four (11–14). During the final three weeks, teams played within their respective grouping for the last four games of conference play. Home and away games within the groups were determined by a preset formula. C-USA Commissioner Judy MacLeod said that "With the goals to improve seeding and increase the number of teams that advance to the postseason, we viewed this as a great opportunity to enhance our top teams' resumes by providing them additional quality games within their conference schedule."

The C-USA tournament was held from March 13–16, 2019 at The Ford Center at The Star in Frisco, Texas. Old Dominion defeated Western Kentucky in the Tournament championship game. As a result Old Dominion received the conference's automatic bid to the NCAA tournament. No other C-USA teams received an NCAA Tournament bid.

== Head coaches ==
=== Coaching changes ===
Following a loss to Lamar on November 27, 2017 that saw UTEP drop to 1–5 on the season, head coach Tim Floyd announced that he was retiring effective immediately. The school had previously announced a new athletic director, Jim Senter, a week prior, but Floyd said that had nothing to do with his decision. Assistant Phil Johnson was named interim head coach of the Miners the next day. On March 12, 2018, the school hired Fresno State head coach Rodney Terry as the new head coach of the Miners.

On December 14, 2017, head coach Mark Price was fired by Charlotte after a 3–6 start to the season and was replaced by Houston Fancher. Houston Fancher was named interim coach for the remainder of the season. On March 6, 2018, new athletic director Mike Hill fired Fancher. On March 19, the school hired Virginia associate head coach Ron Sanchez as the school's new head coach.

March 16, 2018, Florida Atlantic head coach Michael Curry was fired after four seasons. On March 22, it was announced that the school had hired Florida assistant head coach Dusty May as head coach.

Middle Tennessee head coach Kermit Davis left the school on March 19, 2018 to accept the head coaching job at Ole Miss. On March 24, the Blue Raiders named UNC Asheville head coach Nick McDevitt as the team's new head coach.

On April 2, 2018, FIU fired head coach Anthony Evans after five seasons. On April 20, the school announced VCU associate head coach Jeremy Ballard was hired as the new head coach.

=== Coaches ===
Team	Head coach	Previous job	Year at school	Overall record	C-USA record	C-USA championships	NCAA Tournaments
Charlotte	Ron Sanchez	Virginia (asst.)	1	8–21	5–13	0	0
FIU	Jeremy Ballard	VCU (asst.)	1	20–14	10–8	0	0
Florida Atlantic	Dusty May	Florida (asst.)	1	17–16	8–10	0	0
Louisiana Tech	Eric Konkol	Miami (asst.)	4	83–49	42–30	0	0
Marshall	Dan D'Antoni	Los Angeles Lakers (asst.)	5	96–77	52–38	1	1
Middle Tennessee	Nick McDevitt	UNC Asheville	1	11–21	8–10	0	0
North Texas	Grant McCasland	Arkansas State	2	41–30	16–20	0	0
Old Dominion	Jeff Jones	American	6	140–67	73–32	1	1
Rice	Scott Pera	Rice (asst.)	2	20–43	12–24	0	0
Southern Miss	Doc Sadler	Iowa State (asst.)	5	56–94	32–57	0	0
UAB	Robert Ehsan	UAB (asst.)	3	57–44	29–25	0	0
UTEP	Rodney Terry	Fresno State	1	8–21	3–15	0	0
UTSA	Steve Henson	Oklahoma (asst.)	4	51–49	29–25	0	0
WKU	Rick Stansbury	Texas A&M (asst.)	3	62–42	34–20	0	0

Notes:

- All records, appearances, titles, etc. are from time with current school only.
- Year at school includes 2018–19 season.
- Overall and C-USA records are from time at current school and are through the end of the 2018–19 season.

== Preseason ==
=== Preseason Coaches Poll ===
Rank	Team
1.	Western Kentucky (9)
2.	Marshall (5)
3.	Old Dominion
4.	North Texas
5.	UTSA
6.	Louisiana Tech
7.	Southern Miss
8.	UAB
9.	Middle Tennessee
10.	FIU
11.	UTEP
12.	Florida Atlantic
13.	Charlotte
14.	Rice

() first place votes

=== Preseason All-C-USA Team ===
Recipient	School
Jon Davis	Charlotte
Daquan Bracey	La Tech
Jon Elmore	Marshall
C. J. Burks	Marshall
Roosevelt Smart	North Texas
Ahmad Caver	ODU
B. J. Stith	ODU
Zack Bryant	UAB
Jhivvan Jackson	UTSA
Taveion Hollingsworth	WKU
Desean Murray	WKU

== Regular season ==
=== Conference matrix ===
This table summarizes the head-to-head results between teams in conference play.

	Charlotte	FIU	Florida Atlantic	Louisiana Tech	Marshall	Middle Tennessee	North Texas	Old Dominion	Rice	Southern Miss	UAB	UTEP	UTSA	Western Kentucky
vs. Charlotte	–	1–0	0–1	0–1	1–0	2–0	1–0	2–0	2–1	1–0	0–1	1–1	1–0	1–0
vs. FIU	0–1	–	1–2	0–2	2–0	0–1	0–2	1–0	0–1	1–0	1–0	1–0	1–0	0–1
vs. Florida Atlantic	1–0	2–1	–	1–1	2–0	0–1	0–2	0–1	0–1	1–0	1–0	0–1	1–0	1–0
vs. Louisiana Tech	1–0	2–0	1–1	–	1–1	0–1	1–1	1–0	1–0	1–1	0–1	0–1	0–1	0–1
vs. Marshall	0–1	0–2	0–2	1–1	–	0–1	1–1	0–1	1–0	1–0	1–0	0–1	1–0	1–1
vs. Middle Tennessee	0–2	1–0	1–0	1–0	1–0	–	1–0	1–0	2–0	1–0	0–2	0–3	0–1	1–0
vs. North Texas	0–1	2–0	2–0	1–1	1–1	0–1	–	1–0	0–2	0–1	1–0	0–1	1–0	1–0
vs. Old Dominion	0–2	0–1	1–0	0–1	1–0	0–1	0–1	–	0–1	1–1	1–1	0–1	1–1	0–2
vs. Rice	1–2	1–0	1–0	0–1	0–1	0–2	2–0	1–0	–	0–1	1–0	1–1	1–0	1–0
vs. Southern Miss	0–1	0–1	0–1	1–1	0–1	0–1	1–0	1–1	1–0	–	1–1	0–1	0–2	2–0
vs. UAB	1–0	0–1	0–1	1–0	0–1	2–0	0–1	1–1	0–1	1–1	–	0–1	1–1	1–1
vs. UTEP	1–1	0–1	1–0	1–0	1–0	3–0	1–0	1–0	1–1	1–0	1–0	–	2–0	1–0
vs. UTSA	0–1	0–1	0–1	1–0	0–1	1–0	0–1	1–1	0–1	2–0	1–1	0–2	–	1–1
vs. Western Kentucky	0–1	1–0	0–1	1–0	1–1	0–1	0–1	2–0	0–1	0–2	1–1	0–1	1–1	–
Total	5–13	10–8	8–10	9–9	11–7	8–10	8–10	13–5	8–10	11–7	10–8	3–15	11–7	11–7

== Postseason ==
=== C-USA Tournament ===
Only the top 12 conference teams were eligible for the tournament. Old Dominion defeated Western Kentucky in the tournament championship game.

First round Wednesday, March 13; ESPN+
8	Louisiana Tech	57
9	Florida Atlantic	56
5	UAB	70
12	Middle Tennessee	61
7	FIU	57
10	North Texas	71
6	Marshall	82
11	Rice	65

Quarterfinals; Thursday, March 14; Stadium/Facebook
1	Old Dominion	57
8	Louisiana Tech	56
4	UTSA	76
5	UAB	85
2	Western Kentucky	67
10	North Texas	51
3	Southern Miss	82
6	Marshall	73

Semifinals; Friday, March 15; CBSSN
1	Old Dominion	61
5	UAB	59
2	Western Kentucky	70
3	Southern Miss	59

Championship; Saturday, March 16; CBSSN
1	Old Dominion	62
2	Western Kentucky	56

* denotes overtime period.

=== NCAA tournament ===
Seed	Region	School	First Four	First round	Second round	Sweet 16	Elite Eight	Final Four	Championship
14	South	Old Dominion	N/A	eliminated by (3) Purdue 48–61					
