= 2018–19 Southern Miss Golden Eagles basketball team =

American college basketball season

2018–19 Southern Miss Golden Eagles basketball

CBI, First Round
- Conference: Conference USA
- Record: 20–13 (11–7 C-USA)
- Head coach: Doc Sadler (5th season)
- Assistant coaches: Steve Shields; Marques Townsend; Clarence Weatherspoon
- Home arena: Reed Green Coliseum

2018–19 Conference USA men's basketball standings
	Conf.				Overall
Team	W		L	PCT	W		L	PCT
Old Dominion †	13	–	5	.722	26	–	9	.743
Western Kentucky	11	–	7	.611	20	–	14	.588
Southern Miss	11	–	7	.611	20	–	13	.606
UTSA	11	–	7	.611	17	–	15	.531
UAB	10	–	8	.556	20	–	15	.571
Marshall	11	–	7	.611	23	–	14	.622
FIU	10	–	8	.556	20	–	13	.606
Louisiana Tech	9	–	9	.500	20	–	13	.606
Florida Atlantic	8	–	10	.444	17	–	16	.515
North Texas	8	–	10	.444	21	–	12	.636
Rice	8	–	10	.444	13	–	19	.406
Middle Tennessee	8	–	10	.444	11	–	21	.344
Charlotte	5	–	13	.278	8	–	21	.276
UTEP	3	–	15	.167	8	–	21	.276
† 2019 C-USA tournament winner

The 2018–19 Southern Miss Golden Eagles men's basketball team represented the University of Southern Mississippi during the 2018–19 NCAA Division I men's basketball season. The Golden Eagles, led by fifth-year head coach Doc Sadler, played their home games at Reed Green Coliseum in Hattiesburg, Mississippi as members of Conference USA. They finished the season 20-13, 11-7 in C-USA Play to finish a 2-way tie for 2nd place. They defeated Marshall in the quarterfinals of the C-USA tournament before losing in the semifinals to Western Kentucky. They received an at-large bid to the College Basketball Invitational where they lost in the first round to Longwood.

== Previous season ==
The Golden Eagles finished the 2017–18 season 16–18, 7–11 in C-USA play to finish in a tie for ninth place. They defeated FIU and Middle Tennessee before losing to Marshall in the semifinals of the C-USA tournament.

== Departures ==
Name	Number	Pos.	Height	Weight	Year	Hometown	Reason for departure
D'Angelo Richardson	2	G	5'9"	168	Senior	Vicksburg, MS	Walk-on; graduated
Rodney Gill	3	G	6'3"	193	Junior	Theodore, AL	Walk-on; didn't return
Eddie Davis III	15	F	6'7"	248	RS Junior	Las Vegas, NV	Walk-on; transferred to Hartford

=== Incoming transfers ===
Name	Number	Pos.	Height	Weight	Year	Hometown	Previous School
Boban Jacdonmi	13	F	6'9"	225	RS Junior	London, England	Junior college transferred from Chattanooga State CC

== Recruiting class of 2018 ==
College recruiting information
Name	Hometown	School	Height	Weight	Commit date
Gabe Watson; PG	Madison, MS	St. Joseph Catholic High School	6 ft 1 in (1.85 m)	160 lb (73 kg)	Oct 9, 2017
Gabe Watson; PG	Recruit ratings: Scout: Rivals: (NR)				
Shakur Daniel; SG	Little Rock, AR	Southwest Christian Academy	6 ft 5 in (1.96 m)	175 lb (79 kg)	May 11, 2018
Shakur Daniel; SG	Recruit ratings: Scout: Rivals: (NR)				
LaDarius Marshall; SF	Jackson, MS	Forest Hill High School	6 ft 5 in (1.96 m)	205 lb (93 kg)	Apr 11, 2018
LaDarius Marshall; SF	Recruit ratings: Scout: Rivals: 247Sports: (NR)				
Overall recruit ranking:
Note: In many cases, Scout, Rivals, 247Sports, On3, and ESPN may conflict in their listings of height and weight.; In these cases, the average was taken. ESPN grades are on a 100-point scale.; Sources: "2018 Team Ranking". Rivals.

== Roster ==
2018–19 Southern Miss Golden Eagles men's basketball team
Players
Coaches

Pos.	#	Name	Height	Weight	Year	Previous school	Hometown
G	0	Dominic Magee	6 ft 4 in (1.93 m)	190 lb (86 kg)	RS Sr	Grand Canyon	Harvey, Louisiana
G	1	Cortez Edwards	6 ft 2 in (1.88 m)	180 lb (82 kg)	Sr	Osceola High School	Kissimmee, Florida
G	2	Shakur Daniel	6 ft 5 in (1.96 m)	175 lb (79 kg)	Fr	Southwest Christian Academy (AR)	Toronto, Ontario
G	3	Gabe Watson	6 ft 2 in (1.88 m)	180 lb (82 kg)	Fr	St. Joseph Catholic School	Jackson, Mississippi
G	4	Christian Clark (W)	6 ft 0 in (1.83 m)	175 lb (79 kg)	RS Jr	Mack Prep Academy (NC)	Hattiesburg, Mississippi
G	11	LaDavius Draine	6 ft 4 in (1.93 m)	215 lb (98 kg)	So	Calhoun City High School	Calhoun City, Mississippi
F	12	Tim Rowe	6 ft 11 in (2.11 m)	220 lb (100 kg)	Sr	Mt. Zion Prep	Lilburn, Georgia
F	13	Boban Jacdonmi	6 ft 9 in (2.06 m)	250 lb (113 kg)	RS Jr	Chattanooga State Community College	London, England
F	14	Tyler Stevenson (W)	6 ft 7 in (2.01 m)	180 lb (82 kg)	Fr	New Hope High School	Columbus, Mississippi
G	15	Clay Weatherspoon (W)	6 ft 2 in (1.88 m)	195 lb (88 kg)	Jr	Ridgeland High School (MS)	Jackson, Mississippi
G	20	Kevin Holland	6 ft 1 in (1.85 m)	187 lb (85 kg)	RS Sr	Paul W. Bryant High School	Tuscaloosa, Alabama
G	21	Anfernee Hampton (W)	6 ft 5 in (1.96 m)	170 lb (77 kg)	RS Sr	Mississippi Gulf Coast Community College	Jackson, Mississippi
F	23	LaDarius Marshall	6 ft 5 in (1.96 m)	205 lb (93 kg)	Fr	Forest Hill High School	Jackson, Mississippi
F	32	Leonard Harper-Baker	6 ft 5 in (1.96 m)	205 lb (93 kg)	RS Jr	Moberly Area Community College	Detroit, Michigan
G	55	Tyree Griffin	5 ft 10 in (1.78 m)	175 lb (79 kg)	RS Sr	Oklahoma State	New Orleans, Louisiana

Head coach

- Doc Sadler (Auburn)

Assistant coach(es)

- Steve Shields (Baylor)
- Marques Townsend (Kansas)
- Clarence Weatherspoon (Southern Miss)

Legend

- (C) Team captain
- (S) Suspended
- (I) Ineligible
- (W) Walk-on
- Injured
- Current redshirt

Roster

== Schedule and results ==
Date time, TV	Rank^{#}	Opponent^{#}	Result	Record	Site (attendance) city, state
Non-conference regular season
Nov 6, 2018*; 7:00 pm, CUSA TV		Southeastern Baptist College	W 111–66	1–0	Reed Green Coliseum (2,149); Hattiesburg, MS
Nov 11, 2018*; 2:00 pm, ESPN3		at SMU; Cancún Challenge	W 74–64	2–0	Moody Coliseum (5,508); Dallas, TX
Nov 15, 2018*; 7:00 pm, ESPN+		at Troy	W 81–66	3–0	Trojan Arena (3,007); Troy, AL
Nov 20, 2018*; 2:00 pm		vs. North Florida; Cancún Challenge Mayan Division semifinals	L 48–64	3–1	Hard Rock Hotel Riviera Maya; Cancún, Mexico
Nov 21, 2018*; 11:30 am		vs. Western Carolina; Cancún Challenge Mayan Division consolation	W 68–63	4–1	Hard Rock Hotel Riviera Maya; Cancún, Mexico
Nov 25, 2018*; 2:00 pm, CUSA TV		William Carey	L 72–78	4–2	Reed Green Coliseum (1,982); Hattiesburg, MS
Nov 28, 2018*; 7:00 pm		South Alabama	W 71–67	5–2	Reed Green Coliseum; Hattiesburg, MS
Dec 2, 2018*; 7:00 pm		Rust	W 106–46	6–2	Reed Green Coliseum (1,943); Hattiesburg, MS
Dec 11, 2018*; 4:00 pm		Millsaps	W 81–47	7–2	Reed Green Coliseum (2,013); Hattiesburg, MS
Dec 15, 2018*; 4:30 pm, CBSSN		at Wichita State	L 60–63	7–3	Charles Koch Arena (9,356); Wichita, KS
Dec 19, 2018*; 7:00 pm, FSKC/ESPN3		at Kansas State	L 51–55	7–4	Bramlage Coliseum (8,815); Manhattan, KS
Dec 21, 2018*; 7:00 pm		at South Dakota	W 66–60	8–4	Sanford Coyote Sports Center (1,750); Vermillion, SD
Conference USA regular season
Dec 29, 2018; 4:00 pm, ESPN+		at Louisiana Tech	L 56–71	8–5 (0–1)	Thomas Assembly Center (1,571); Ruston, LA
Jan 3, 2019; 3:00 pm		at Rice	L 65–73	8–6 (0–2)	Tudor Fieldhouse (1,108); Houston, TX
Jan 5, 2019; 5:00 pm, ESPN+		at North Texas	L 62–65	8–7 (0–3)	The Super Pit; Denton, TX
Jan 10, 2019; 7:00 pm, ESPN+		Middle Tennessee	W 77–70	9–7 (1–3)	Reed Green Coliseum (1,987); Hattiesburg, MS
Jan 12, 2019; 4:00 pm, ESPN+		UAB	W 73–68	10–7 (2–3)	Reed Green Coliseum (2,886); Hattiesburg, MS
Jan 17, 2019; 6:00 pm		at Charlotte	W 63–60	11–7 (3–3)	Dale F. Halton Arena (3,889); Charlotte, NC
Jan 19, 2019; 3:00 pm, ESPN+		at Old Dominion	L 60–78	11–8 (3–4)	Ted Constant Convocation Center (7,003); Norfolk, VA
Jan 24, 2019; 7:00 pm, Stadium		Western Kentucky	L 63–66	11–9 (3–5)	Reed Green Coliseum (2,568); Hattiesburg, MS
Jan 26, 2019; 4:00 pm, Stadium		Marshall	W 101–51	12–9 (4–5)	Reed Green Coliseum (3,316); Hattiesburg, MS
Jan 31, 2019; 6:00 pm		at FIU	W 89–73	13–9 (5–5)	Ocean Bank Convocation Center (601); Miami, FL
Feb 2, 2019; 3:00 pm		at Florida Atlantic	W 74–72	14–9 (6–5)	FAU Arena (1,510); Boca Raton, FL
Feb 9, 2019; 4:00 pm, ESPN+		Louisiana Tech	W 73–71 ^{OT}	15–9 (7–5)	Reed Green Coliseum (4,587); Hattiesburg, MS
Feb 14, 2019; 7:00 pm, ESPN+		UTSA	W 78–71	16–9 (8–5)	Reed Green Coliseum (2,801); Hattiesburg, MS
Feb 16, 2019; 2:00 pm, ESPN+		UTEP	W 77–47	17–9 (9–5)	Reed Green Coliseum (3,536); Hattiesburg, MS
Feb 23, 2019; 2:00 pm, Stadium		UAB	L 72–76 ^{OT}	17–10 (9–6)	Reed Green Coliseum (4,456); Hattiesburg, MS
Mar 3, 2019; 2:00 pm		at Western Kentucky	L 71–76	17–11 (9–7)	E. A. Diddle Arena (5,408); Bowling Green, KY
Mar 6, 2019; 6:00 pm		Old Dominion	W 59–52	18–11 (10–7)	Ted Constant Convocation Center (8,215); Norfolk, VA
Mar 9, 2019; 2:00 pm		UTSA	W 81–48	19–11 (11–7)	Reed Green Coliseum (4,780); Hattiesburg, MS
Conference USA tournament
Mar 14, 2019; 9:00 pm, FBL	(3)	vs. (6) Marshall; Quarterfinals	W 82–73	20–11	Ford Center at The Star (4,024); Frisco, TX
Mar 15, 2019; 9:00 pm, CBSSN	(3)	vs. (2) Western Kentucky; Semifinals	L 59–70	20–12	Ford Center at The Star (4,692); Frisco, TX
College Basketball Invitational
Mar 20, 2019*; 6:00 pm, ESPN+		at Longwood; First round	L 68–90	20–13	Willett Hall (1,372); Farmville, VA
*Non-conference game. ^{#}Rankings from AP Poll. (#) Tournament seedings in parentheses. All times are in Central Time Source.
