= 2018–19 UTEP Miners men's basketball team =

American college basketball season

2018–19 UTEP Miners men's basketball
- Conference: Conference USA
- Record: 8–21 (3–15 C-USA)
- Head coach: Rodney Terry (1st season)
- Assistant coaches: Lamont Smith; Brian Burton; Nick Matson
- Home arena: Don Haskins Center

2018–19 Conference USA men's basketball standings
	Conf.				Overall
Team	W		L	PCT	W		L	PCT
Old Dominion †	13	–	5	.722	26	–	9	.743
Western Kentucky	11	–	7	.611	20	–	14	.588
Southern Miss	11	–	7	.611	20	–	13	.606
UTSA	11	–	7	.611	17	–	15	.531
UAB	10	–	8	.556	20	–	15	.571
Marshall	11	–	7	.611	23	–	14	.622
FIU	10	–	8	.556	20	–	13	.606
Louisiana Tech	9	–	9	.500	20	–	13	.606
Florida Atlantic	8	–	10	.444	17	–	16	.515
North Texas	8	–	10	.444	21	–	12	.636
Rice	8	–	10	.444	13	–	19	.406
Middle Tennessee	8	–	10	.444	11	–	21	.344
Charlotte	5	–	13	.278	8	–	21	.276
UTEP	3	–	15	.167	8	–	21	.276
† 2019 C-USA tournament winner

The 2018–19 UTEP Miners basketball team represented the University of Texas at El Paso during the 2018–19 NCAA Division I men's basketball season. The Miners, led by first year head coach Rodney Terry, played their home games at the Don Haskins Center as members of Conference USA. UTEP finished the season 8–21, 3–15 in C-USA play to finish in last place. They failed to qualify for the C-USA Tournament. UTEP averaged 4,677 fans per game.

== Previous season ==
The Miners finished the 2017–18 season 11–20, 6–12 in C-USA play to finish in a tie for 11th place. They lost in the first round of the C-USA tournament to UTSA.

Following a loss to Lamar on November 27, 2017 that saw the Miners drop to 1–5 on the season, head coach Tim Floyd announced that he was retiring effective immediately. The school had previously announced a new athletic director, Jim Senter, a week prior, but Floyd said that had nothing to do with his decision. Assistant Phil Johnson was named interim head coach of the Miners the next day. Following the season, it was announced that Johnson would not return.

On March 12, 2018, the school hired Fresno State head coach Rodney Terry as the new head coach of the Miners.

== Offseason ==
=== Departures ===
Name	Number	Pos.	Height	Weight	Year	Hometown	Reason for departure
Omega Harris	2	G	6'2"	175	Senior	Bethany, OK	Graduated
Tirus Smith	4	F	6'9"	250	Freshman	Richton, MS	Transferred to Jones County JC
Trey Wade	5	G/F	6'6"	205	Freshman	Marietta, GA	Walk-on; transferred to South Plains College
Jake Flaggert	11	G/F	6'7"	210	RS Senior	Lucas, TX	Graduated
Isiah Osborne	13	G	6'5"	180	Sophomore	Windsor, ON	Graduate transferred to Carleton
Trey Touchet	21	G	6'2"	190	RS Junior	Lafayette, IN	Graduate transferred to McNeese State
DeShaun Highler	24	G	6'2"	165	Freshman	Riverside, CA	Walk-on; transferred to East Los Angeles College
Keith Frazier	25	G	6'5"	190	RS Senior	Dallas, TX	Graduated
Matt Willms	41	C	7'1"	235	RS Senior	Leamington, ON	Graduated

=== Incoming transfers ===
Name	Number	Pos.	Height	Weight	Year	Hometown	Previous School
Tydus Verhoeven	4	F	6'8"	215	Sophomore	Manteca, CA	Transferred from Duquesne. Under NCAA transfer rules, Verhoeven will sit out the 2018–19 season. Will have three years of remaining eligibility.
Souley Boum	5	G	6'3"	145	Sophomore	Oakland, CA	Transferred from San Francisco. Under NCAA transfer rules, Verhoeven will sit out the 2018–19 season. Will have three years of remaining eligibility.
Bryson Williams	11	F	6'8"	230	Junior	Fresno, CA	Transferred from Fresno State. Under NCAA transfer rules, Williams will sit out the 2018–19 season. Will have two years of remaining eligibility.
Anthony Tarke	12	G/F	6'6"	205	Junior	Gaithersburg, MD	Transferred from NJIT. Under NCAA transfer rules, Williams will sit out the 2018–19 season. Tarke have two years of remaining eligibility.
Ountae Campbell	13	G	6'4"	195	RS Junior	Los Angeles, CA	Junior college transferred from Casper College. Will join the team as a walk-on.
Gilles Dekonick	33	F	6'6"	210	Sophomore	Diest, Belgium	Transferred from Fresno State. Under NCAA transfer rules, Dekonick will sit out the 2018–19 season. Will have three years of remaining eligibility. Will join the team as a walk-on.

=== Class of 2018 recruits ===
College recruiting information
Name	Hometown	School	Height	Weight	Commit date
Jordan Lathon; PG	Grandview, MO	Grandview High School	6 ft 4 in (1.93 m)	190 lb (86 kg)	Aug 2, 2018
Jordan Lathon; PG	Recruit ratings: Scout: Rivals: 247Sports: ESPN:				
Kaosi Ezeagu; PF	Brampton, ON	GTA Prep	6 ft 11 in (2.11 m)	230 lb (100 kg)	May 16, 2018
Kaosi Ezeagu; PF	Recruit ratings: Scout: Rivals: 247Sports: ESPN:				
Nigel Hawkins; SG	Houston, TX	Cypress Falls High School	6 ft 2 in (1.88 m)	175 lb (79 kg)	Apr 23, 2018
Nigel Hawkins; SG	Recruit ratings: Scout: Rivals: 247Sports: ESPN:				
Efe Odigie; C	Houston, TX	Pro-Vision Academy	6 ft 7 in (2.01 m)	220 lb (100 kg)	Apr 14, 2018
Efe Odigie; C	Recruit ratings: Scout: Rivals: 247Sports: ESPN:				
Overall recruit ranking:
Note: In many cases, Scout, Rivals, 247Sports, On3, and ESPN may conflict in their listings of height and weight.; In these cases, the average was taken. ESPN grades are on a 100-point scale.; Sources: "2018 Team Ranking". Rivals.

=== Class of 2019 recruits ===
College recruiting information (2019)
Name	Hometown	School	Height	Weight	Commit date
Brendan Wenzel; SG	Helotes, TX	O'Connor High School	6 ft 5 in (1.96 m)	170 lb (77 kg)	Sep 21, 2018
Brendan Wenzel; SG	Recruit ratings: Scout: Rivals: 247Sports: ESPN:				
Jesse Zarzuela; PG	Houston, TX	Spring Woods High School	6 ft 3 in (1.91 m)	170 lb (77 kg)	Sep 20, 2018
Jesse Zarzuela; PG	Recruit ratings: Scout: Rivals: 247Sports: ESPN:				
Overall recruit ranking:
Note: In many cases, Scout, Rivals, 247Sports, On3, and ESPN may conflict in their listings of height and weight.; In these cases, the average was taken. ESPN grades are on a 100-point scale.; Sources: "2019 Team Ranking". Rivals.

== Roster ==
2018–19 UTEP Miners men's basketball team
Players
Coaches

Pos.	#	Name	Height	Weight	Year	Previous school	Hometown
G	0	Nigel Hawkins	6 ft 4 in (1.93 m)	185 lb (84 kg)	Fr	Cypress Falls HS	Houston, TX
F	1	Paul Thomas	6 ft 8 in (2.03 m)	210 lb (95 kg)	Sr	Summer Creek HS	Humble, TX
G	2	Jordan Lathon	6 ft 4 in (1.93 m)	190 lb (86 kg)	Fr	Grandview HS	Grandview, MO
G	3	Evan Gilyard	5 ft 10 in (1.78 m)	155 lb (70 kg)	So	Simeon Career Academy	Chicago, IL
F	4	Tydus Verhoeven (redshirt)	6 ft 9 in (2.06 m)	215 lb (98 kg)	So	Manteca HS; Duquesne	Manteca, CA
G	5	Souley Boum (redshirt)	6 ft 3 in (1.91 m)	160 lb (73 kg)	So	Oakland Tech HS; San Francisco	Oakland, CA
F	11	Bryson Williams (redshirt)	6 ft 8 in (2.03 m)	225 lb (102 kg)	Jr	Roosevelt HS; Fresno State	Fresno, California
G/F	12	Anthony Tarke (redshirt)	6 ft 6 in (1.98 m)	220 lb (100 kg)	Jr	Gaithersburg; NJIT	Gaithersburg, MD
G	13	Ountae Campbell (W)	6 ft 4 in (1.93 m)	195 lb (88 kg)	RS Jr	Brentwood HS; Casper College	Los Angeles, CA
G	15	Kobe Magee	6 ft 1 in (1.85 m)	150 lb (68 kg)	So	Brandeis HS	San Antonio, TX
G/F	20	Garrett Sullivan (W)	6 ft 5 in (1.96 m)	190 lb (86 kg)	Fr	Hillcrest Prep Academy	Easthampton, MA
G	21	Jakobe Dill (W)	6 ft 3 in (1.91 m)	175 lb (79 kg)	Fr	Heritage Academy	Beaumont, TX
G/F	23	Deon Stroud (W)	6 ft 3 in (1.91 m)	190 lb (86 kg)	Fr	Trinity International	Fresno, CA
G	24	Brandon Averitt (W)	6 ft 1 in (1.85 m)	150 lb (68 kg)	Fr	Tarbut V' Torah HS	Monrovia, CA
F	25	Kaosi Ezeagu	6 ft 10 in (2.08 m)	240 lb (109 kg)	Fr	Mississauga Secondary School	Brampton, ON
F	25	Efe Odigie	6 ft 10 in (2.08 m)	240 lb (109 kg)	Fr	Pro-Vision School	Houston, TX
F	33	Gilles Dekoninck (W) (redshirt)	6 ft 6 in (1.98 m)	205 lb (93 kg)	So	Huntington Prep; Fresno State	Diest, Belgium
C	54	Isaiah Rhyanes (W)	6 ft 9 in (2.06 m)	220 lb (100 kg)	RS Jr	Andress HS; El Paso CC	El Paso, TX

Head coach

- Rodney Terry (St. Edward's)

Assistant coach(es)

- Lamont Smith (San Diego)
- Brian Burton (UT Dallas)
- Nick Matson (VMI)

Legend

- (C) Team captain
- (S) Suspended
- (I) Ineligible
- (W) Walk-on
- Injured
- Current redshirt

Roster

== Schedule and results ==
Date time, TV	Opponent	Result	Record	Site (attendance) city, state
Non-conference regular season
Nov 6, 2018*; 7:00 pm	UT Permian Basin	W 90–63	1–0	Don Haskins Center (4,227); El Paso, TX
Nov 9, 2018*; 7:00 pm	at New Mexico State; Battle of I-10	L 69–96	1–1	Pan American Center (6,125); Las Cruces, NM
Nov 14, 2018*; 6:00 pm, P12N	at Arizona	L 46–79	1–2	McKale Center (13,651); Tucson, AZ
Nov 19, 2018*; 7:00 pm	Eastern New Mexico	W 66–59	2–2	Don Haskins Center (4,505); El Paso, TX
Nov 24, 2018*; 5:30 pm	at New Mexico	L 78–84	2–3	Dreamstyle Arena (11,266); Albuquerque, NM
Nov 28, 2018*; 7:00 pm	New Mexico State; Battle of I-10	L 58–62	2–4	Don Haskins Center (6,106); El Paso, TX
Dec 1, 2018*; 7:00 pm	Northwestern State	W 77–47	3–4	Don Haskins Center (4,670); El Paso, TX
Dec 4, 2018*; 6:30 pm, FS1	at Marquette	L 69–76	3–5	Fiserv Forum (13,064); Milwaukee, WI
Dec 16, 2018*; 1:00 pm	UC Riverside	W 68–56	4–5	Don Haskins Center (4,454); El Paso, TX
Dec 21, 2018*; 7:00 pm	Norfolk State; Sun Bowl Invitational semifinals	L 62–75	4–6	Don Haskins Center (4,284); El Paso, TX
Dec 22, 2018*; 5:00 pm	Wyoming; Sun Bowl Invitational 3rd place game	W 76–65	5–6	Don Haskins Center (4,011); El Paso, TX
Conference USA regular season
Jan 3, 2019; 6:00 pm, ESPN+	at UTSA	L 60–75	5–7 (0–1)	Convocation Center (1,218); San Antonio, TX
Jan 5, 2019; 7:00 pm	UTSA	L 63–67	5–8 (0–2)	Don Haskins Center (4,565); El Paso, TX
Jan 10, 2019; 7:00 pm, ESPN+	North Texas	L 51–58	5–9 (0–3)	Don Haskins Center (4,451); El Paso, TX
Jan 12, 2019; 7:00 pm	Rice	W 65–64	6–9 (1–3)	Don Haskins Center (4,345); El Paso, TX
Jan 17, 2019; 6:00 pm	at UAB	L 63–76	6–10 (1–4)	Bartow Arena (2,297); Birmingham, AL
Jan 19, 2019; 4:00 pm	at Middle Tennessee	L 72–75	6–11 (1–5)	Murphy Center (3,806); Murfreesboro, TN
Jan 24, 2019; 7:00 pm, ESPN+	Old Dominion	L 48–50	6–12 (1–6)	Don Haskins Center (4,798); El Paso, TX
Jan 26, 2019; 7:00 pm	Charlotte	W 57–53	7–12 (2–6)	Don Haskins Center (4,856); El Paso, TX
Jan 31, 2019; 5:30 pm, beIN	at Marshall	L 86–91	7–13 (2–7)	Cam Henderson Center (5,765); Huntington, WV
Feb 2, 2019; 5:00 pm, ESPN+	at Western Kentucky	L 59–76	7–14 (2–8)	E. A. Diddle Arena (6,397); Bowling Green, KY
Feb 7, 2019; 7:00 pm	Florida Atlantic	L 48–61	7–15 (2–9)	Don Haskins Center (4,646); El Paso, TX
Feb 9, 2019; 7:00 pm, ESPN+	FIU	W 85–75	8–15 (3–9)	Don Haskins Center (5,094); El Paso, TX
Feb 14, 2019; 5:30 pm, beIN	at Louisiana Tech	L 57–71	8–16 (3–10)	Thomas Assembly Center; Ruston, LA
Feb 16, 2019; 3:00 pm, ESPN+	at Southern Miss	L 47–77	8–17 (3–11)	Reed Green Coliseum (3,536); Hattiesburg, MS
Feb 23, 2019; 8:00 pm	Rice	L 81–85 ^{2OT}	8–18 (3–12)	Don Haskins Center (5,071); El Paso, TX
Mar 3, 2019; 12:00 pm	at Charlotte	L 58–68	8–19 (3–13)	Halton Arena (2,821); Charlotte, NC
Mar 6, 2019; 8:00 pm	Middle Tennessee	L 53–69	8–20 (3–14)	Don Haskins Center (4,748); El Paso, TX
Mar 9, 2019; 7:30 pm	at Middle Tennessee	L 47–48	8–21 (3–15)	Murphy Center; Murfreesboro, TN
*Non-conference game. ^{#}Rankings from AP Poll. (#) Tournament seedings in parentheses. All times are in Mountain Time.

== See also ==
- 2018–19 UTEP Miners women's basketball team
