= 2018–19 Louisiana Tech Bulldogs basketball team =

American college basketball season

2018–19 Louisiana Tech Bulldogs basketball
- Conference: Conference USA
- Record: 20–13 (9–9 C-USA)
- Head coach: Eric Konkol (4th season)
- Assistant coaches: Duffy Conroy; Yaphett King; Talvin Hester
- Home arena: Thomas Assembly Center

2018–19 Conference USA men's basketball standings
	Conf.				Overall
Team	W		L	PCT	W		L	PCT
Old Dominion †	13	–	5	.722	26	–	9	.743
Western Kentucky	11	–	7	.611	20	–	14	.588
Southern Miss	11	–	7	.611	20	–	13	.606
UTSA	11	–	7	.611	17	–	15	.531
UAB	10	–	8	.556	20	–	15	.571
Marshall	11	–	7	.611	23	–	14	.622
FIU	10	–	8	.556	20	–	13	.606
Louisiana Tech	9	–	9	.500	20	–	13	.606
Florida Atlantic	8	–	10	.444	17	–	16	.515
North Texas	8	–	10	.444	21	–	12	.636
Rice	8	–	10	.444	13	–	19	.406
Middle Tennessee	8	–	10	.444	11	–	21	.344
Charlotte	5	–	13	.278	8	–	21	.276
UTEP	3	–	15	.167	8	–	21	.276
† 2019 C-USA tournament winner

The 2018–19 Louisiana Tech Bulldogs basketball team represented Louisiana Tech University during the 2018–19 NCAA Division I men's basketball season. The Bulldogs, led by fourth-year head coach Eric Konkol, played their home games at the Thomas Assembly Center in Ruston, Louisiana as members of Conference USA.

== Previous season ==
The Bulldogs finished the 2017–18 season 17–16, 7–11 in C-USA play to finish in a tie for ninth place. As the No. 10 seed in the C-USA tournament, they defeated North Texas before losing to Old Dominion in the quarterfinals.

== Offseason ==
=== Departures ===
Name	Number	Pos.	Height	Weight	Year	Hometown	Reason for departure
Jacobi Boykins	0	G	6'6"	175	Senior	St. Petersburg, FL	Graduated
Jalen Harris	3	G	6'4"	195	Sophomore	Duncanville, TX	Transferred to Nevada
Joniah White	5	C	7'0"	215	RS Junior	Duck Hill, MS	Retired due to heart-related health issues
Jeremiah Taylor	15	G	6'4"	200	Sophomore	Lewisville, TX	Walk-on; transferred
Jy'lan Washington	22	F	6'9"	195	Junior	Smyrna, TN	Transferred to Tennessee State
Harrison Curry	24	F	6'7"	230	Junior	Ann Arbor, MI	Transferred to Detroit

=== Incoming transfers ===
Name	Number	Pos.	Height	Weight	Year	Hometown	Previous school
Ra'Shawn Langston	0	G	6'3"	185	Junior	Little Rock, AR	Junior college transferred from Connors State College
Kalob Ledoux	2	G	6'3"	215	Junior	Port Barre, LA	Transferred from McNeese State. Under NCAA transfer rules, Ledoux will have to sit out for the 2018–19 season. Will have two years of remaining eligibility.
Mubarak Muhammed	23	F	6'8"	225	Junior	Dora, AL	Junior college transferred from Boosier Parish CC

=== Recruiting class of 2018 ===
College recruiting information
Name	Hometown	School	Height	Weight	Commit date
Stacey Thomas; PF	Houston, TX	Fort Bend Christian Homeschool	6 ft 9 in (2.06 m)	210 lb (95 kg)	Nov 14, 2017
Stacey Thomas; PF	Recruit ratings: Scout: Rivals: ESPN:				
Overall recruit ranking:
Note: In many cases, Scout, Rivals, 247Sports, On3, and ESPN may conflict in their listings of height and weight.; In these cases, the average was taken. ESPN grades are on a 100-point scale.; Sources: "2018 Team Ranking". Rivals.

== Roster ==
2018–19 Louisiana Tech Bulldogs men's basketball team
Players
Coaches

Pos.	#	Name	Height	Weight	Year	Previous school	Hometown
G	0	Ra'Shawn Langston	6 ft 3 in (1.91 m)	200 lb (91 kg)	Jr	Connors State College	Little Rock, Arkansas
G	1	Derric Jean	6 ft 2 in (1.88 m)	190 lb (86 kg)	Sr	McArthur High School	Miami, Florida
G	2	Kalob Ledoux (redshirt)	6 ft 3 in (1.91 m)	190 lb (86 kg)	Jr	McNeese State	Port Barre, Louisiana
G	3	Amorie Archibald	6 ft 3 in (1.91 m)	185 lb (84 kg)	So	Trinity Christian Academy	Deltona, Florida
G	4	DaQuan Bracey	5 ft 11 in (1.8 m)	175 lb (79 kg)	Jr	St. Frances Academy	Baltimore, Maryland
F	10	Anthony Duruji	6 ft 7 in (2.01 m)	215 lb (98 kg)	So	St. Andrew's Episcopal School	Germantown, Maryland
G	11	JaColby Pemberton	6 ft 5 in (1.96 m)	190 lb (86 kg)	RS So	Lancaster High School	Dallas, Texas
F	13	Stacey Thomas	6 ft 8 in (2.03 m)	220 lb (100 kg)	Fr	Fort Bend Christian Homeschool	Houston, Texas
G	21	Exavian Christon	6 ft 4 in (1.93 m)	200 lb (91 kg)	So	Hot Springs High School	Hot Springs, Arkansas
F	23	Mubarak Muhammed	6 ft 8 in (2.03 m)	225 lb (102 kg)	Jr	Bossier Parish Community College	Dora, Alabama
C	25	Kyle McKinley	6 ft 10 in (2.08 m)	250 lb (113 kg)	RS Jr	Northeast Community College	Stillwater, Minnesota
F	35	Oliver Powell	6 ft 8 in (2.03 m)	240 lb (109 kg)	Jr	Rowlett High School	Rowlett, Texas

Head coach

- Eric Konkol (UW–Eau Claire)

Assistant coach(es)

- Duffy Conroy (St. Ambrose)
- Yaphett King (Cal State Fullerton)
- Talvin Hester (Texas Wesleyan)

Legend

- (C) Team captain
- (S) Suspended
- (I) Ineligible
- (W) Walk-on
- Injured
- Current redshirt

Roster

== Schedule and results ==
Date time, TV	Rank^{#}	Opponent^{#}	Result	Record	Site (attendance) city, state
Exhibition
Nov 1, 2018*; 6:30 pm		Union (TN)	W 103–58		Thomas Assembly Center (1,738); Ruston, LA
Non-conference regular season
Nov 6, 2018*; 7:00 pm, Cox YurView		at Wichita State	W 71–58	1–0	Charles Koch Arena (10,267); Wichita, KS
Nov 11, 2018*; 4:00 pm		Sam Houston State	W 76–69	2–0	Thomas Assembly Center (2,349); Ruston, LA
Nov 13, 2018*; 6:30 pm		Harding; Delaware Invitational	W 89–58	3–0	Thomas Assembly Center (1,914); Ruston, LA
Nov 16, 2018*; 7:00 pm, SECN+		at No. 22 LSU	L 67–74	3–1	Pete Maravich Assembly Center (9,557); Baton Rouge, LA
Nov 20, 2018*; 6:30 pm		Tougaloo; Delaware Invitational	W 87–68	4–1	Thomas Assembly Center (1,433); Ruston, LA
Nov 24, 2018*; 4:00 pm		vs. UNC Greensboro; Delaware Invitational	L 73–80	4–2	Bob Carpenter Center (172); Dover, DE
Nov 26, 2018*; 6:00 pm		at Delaware; Delaware Invitational	L 71–75	4–3	Bob Carpenter Center (1,624); Dover, DE
Dec 1, 2018*; 4:00 pm		Houston Baptist	W 85–78	5–3	Thomas Assembly Center (1,704); Ruston, LA
Dec 4, 2018*; 6:30 pm		Prairie View A&M	W 82–68	6–3	Thomas Assembly Center (1,685); Ruston, LA
Dec 7, 2018*; 6:30 pm		at Stephen F. Austin	W 96–93 ^{OT}	7–3	William R. Johnson Coliseum (3,823); Nacogdoches, TX
Dec 11, 2018*; 6:30 pm		Mississippi Valley State	W 96–80	8–3	Thomas Assembly Center (1,816); Ruston, LA
Dec 15, 2018*; 7:00 pm, ESPN+		at Louisiana	W 83–62	9–3	Cajundome (3,732); Lafayette, LA
Dec 22, 2018*; 4:00 pm		Texas A&M–Corpus Christi	W 73–68	10–3	Thomas Assembly Center (1,307); Ruston, LA
Conference USA regular season
Dec 29, 2018; 4:00 pm, ESPN+		Southern Miss	W 71–56	11–3 (1–0)	Thomas Assembly Center (1,571); Ruston, LA
Jan 3, 2019; 7:00 pm, ESPN+		at North Texas	L 59–63	11–4 (1–1)	The Super Pit (4,238); Denton, TX
Jan 5, 2019; 2:00 pm, ESPN3		at Rice	L 66–78	11–5 (1–2)	Tudor Fieldhouse (1,430); Houston, TX
Jan 10, 2019; 6:30 pm, beIN		UAB	W 64–53	12–5 (2–2)	Thomas Assembly Center (3,081); Ruston, LA
Jan 12, 2019; 4:00 pm, ESPN+		Middle Tennessee	W 73–56	13–5 (3–2)	Thomas Assembly Center (3,894); Ruston, LA
Jan 17, 2019; 6:00 pm, ESPN+		at Old Dominion	L 63–64	13–6 (3–3)	Ted Constant Convocation Center (5,654); Norfolk, VA
Jan 19, 2019; 3:00 pm		at Charlotte	L 40–55	13–7 (3–4)	Dale F. Halton Arena; Charlotte, NC
Jan 24, 2019; 8:00 pm, CBSSN		Marshall	W 89–80	14–7 (4–4)	Thomas Assembly Center (3,745); Ruston, LA
Jan 26, 2019; 4:00 pm, Stadium		Western Kentucky	W 62–50	15–7 (5–4)	Thomas Assembly Center (3,917); Ruston, LA
Jan 31, 2019; 6:00 pm		at Florida Atlantic	L 61–69	15–8 (5–5)	FAU Arena (921); Boca Raton, FL
Feb 2, 2019; 6:00 pm		at FIU	L 69–75	15–9 (5–6)	Ocean Bank Convocation Center (2,254); Miami, FL
Feb 9, 2019; 4:00 pm, ESPN+		at Southern Miss	L 71–73	15–10 (5–7)	Reed Green Coliseum (4,587); Hattiesburg, MS
Feb 14, 2019; 6:30 pm, beIN		UTEP	W 71–57	16–10 (6–7)	Thomas Assembly Center (3,082); Ruston, LA
Feb 16, 2019; 2:00 pm, ESPN+		UTSA	W 72–67	17–10 (7–7)	Thomas Assembly Center (3,368); Ruston, LA
Feb 23, 2019; 7:00 pm		North Texas	W 66–53	18–10 (8–7)	Thomas Assembly Center (2,936); Ruston, LA
Feb 28, 2019; 6:30 pm		Marshall	L 79–90	18–11 (8–8)	Thomas Assembly Center (3,217); Ruston, LA
Mar 3, 2019; 11:00 am		at FIU	L 76–83	18–12 (8–9)	Ocean Bank Convocation Center (519); Miami, FL
Mar 6, 2019; 6:00 pm		at Florida Atlantic	W 72–69	19–12 (9–9)	FAU Arena (842); Boca Raton, FL
Conference USA tournament
Mar 13, 2019; 6:00 pm, ESPN+	(8)	vs. (9) Florida Atlantic; C–USA tournament first round	W 57–56	20–12	Ford Center at The Star; Frisco, TX
Mar 14, 2019; 6:00 pm, Stadium	(8)	vs. (1) Old Dominion; C–USA Tournament Quarterfinal	L 56–57	20–13	Ford Center at The Star; Frisco, TX
*Non-conference game. (#) Tournament seedings in parentheses. All times are in Central Time.
