= 2018–19 Middle Tennessee Blue Raiders men's basketball team =

American college basketball season

2018–19 Middle Tennessee Blue Raiders men's basketball
- Conference: Conference USA
- Record: 11–21 (8–10 C-USA)
- Head coach: Nick McDevitt (1st season)
- Assistant coaches: Sean Dixon; Wes Long; Andre Morgan
- Home arena: Murphy Center

2018–19 Conference USA men's basketball standings
	Conf.				Overall
Team	W		L	PCT	W		L	PCT
Old Dominion †	13	–	5	.722	26	–	9	.743
Western Kentucky	11	–	7	.611	20	–	14	.588
Southern Miss	11	–	7	.611	20	–	13	.606
UTSA	11	–	7	.611	17	–	15	.531
UAB	10	–	8	.556	20	–	15	.571
Marshall	11	–	7	.611	23	–	14	.622
FIU	10	–	8	.556	20	–	13	.606
Louisiana Tech	9	–	9	.500	20	–	13	.606
Florida Atlantic	8	–	10	.444	17	–	16	.515
North Texas	8	–	10	.444	21	–	12	.636
Rice	8	–	10	.444	13	–	19	.406
Middle Tennessee	8	–	10	.444	11	–	21	.344
Charlotte	5	–	13	.278	8	–	21	.276
UTEP	3	–	15	.167	8	–	21	.276
† 2019 C-USA tournament winner

The 2018–19 Middle Tennessee Blue Raiders men's basketball team represented Middle Tennessee State University during the 2018–19 NCAA Division I men's basketball season. The Blue Raiders, led by first-year head coach Nick McDevitt, played their home games at the Murphy Center in Murfreesboro, Tennessee as members of Conference USA (C-USA).

The Blue Raiders finished the season 11–21 overall, 8–10 in C-USA play, to finish in a four-way tie for ninth place. In the C-USA tournament, they were defeated in the first round by UAB.

== Previous season ==
The Blue Raiders finished the 2017–18 season 25–8 overall, 16–2 in C-USA play, to win the regular season championship. In the C-USA tournament, they were defeated in the quarterfinals by Southern Miss in overtime. As a regular-season conference champion who failed to win their conference tournament, the Blue Raiders received an automatic bid to the National Invitation Tournament, where they defeated Vermont in the first round before losing to Louisville in the second round.

The season marked the first time in the program's history that the Blue Raiders were ranked in the AP Top 25 during the season, coming in at No. 24 on the week of February 19.

Head coach Kermit Davis left the school on March 19, 2018 to accept a head coaching job at Ole Miss. He finished at Middle Tennessee with a 16-year record of 332–188. On March 24, the Blue Raiders named UNC Asheville head coach Nick McDevitt as the team's new head coach.

== Offseason ==
=== Departures ===
Name	Number	Pos.	Height	Weight	Year	Hometown	Reason for departure
Tyrik Dixon	0	G	6' 1"	184	Sophomore	Bentonville, AR	Transferred to Missouri State
Brandon Walters	1	F	6' 10"	250	RS senior	Chattanooga, TN	Graduated
Antwain Johnson	2	G	6' 2"	197	Junior	Greenwood, FL	Dismissed from the team; transferred to Buffalo
Nick King	5	F	6' 7"	225	Senior	Memphis, TN	Graduated
Will Slatten	10	G	6' 4"	166	RS freshman	Sparta, TN	Walk-on; left the team for personal reasons
Edward Simpson Jr.	11	G	6' 2"	195	Senior	Ocean Springs, MS	Graduated
Therren Shelton-Szmidt	12	G	6' 5"	190	Freshman	Mississauga, ON	Left the team due to his religion
Giddy Potts	20	G	6' 2"	217	Senior	Athens, AL	Graduated
David Simmons	21	G	6' 3"	195	Junior	Henderson, KY	Graduate transferred to Southern Indiana
Davion Thomas	35	F	6' 9"	215	RS freshman	Columbus, GA	Dismissed from the team

=== Incoming transfers ===
Name	Number	Pos.	Height	Weight	Year	Hometown	Previous school
DeAndre Dishman	2	F	6' 6"	215	Junior	Lexington, KY	Transferred from Eastern Kentucky. Under NCAA transfer rules, he had to sit out in the 2018–19 season. Had two years of eligibility left.
Reggie Scurry	22	F	6' 5"	213	Senior	Atlanta, GA	Transferred from Missouri State. Under NCAA transfer rules, he had to sit out in the 2018–19 season. Had one year of eligibility left.
C. J. Jones	23	G	6' 5"	180	Junior	Birmingham, AL	Transferred from Arkansas. Under NCAA transfer rules, he had to sit out in the 2018–19 season. Had two years of eligibility left.

=== 2018 recruiting class ===
College recruiting
Name	Hometown	School	Height	Weight	Commit date
Junior Farquhar; PG	Orangeville, ON	Orangeville Prep	6 ft 3 in (1.91 m)	185 lb (84 kg)	Jul 18, 2018
Junior Farquhar; PG	Recruit ratings: Scout: Rivals: (NR)				
Anthony Crump; SG	Canton, MI	Plymouth High School	6 ft 7 in (2.01 m)	175 lb (79 kg)	May 8, 2018
Anthony Crump; SG	Recruit ratings: Scout: Rivals: (NR)				
Jayce Johnson; SG	Buffalo, NY	Canisius High School	6 ft 5 in (1.96 m)	205 lb (93 kg)	Jul 27, 2018
Jayce Johnson; SG	Recruit ratings: Scout: Rivals: (NR)				
Overall recruit ranking:
Note: In many cases, Scout, Rivals, 247Sports, On3, and ESPN may conflict in their listings of height and weight.; In these cases, the average was taken. ESPN grades are on a 100-point scale.; Sources: "2018 Team Ranking". Rivals.

=== 2019 recruiting class ===
College recruiting (2019)
Name	Hometown	School	Height	Weight	Commit date
Keishawn Davidson; PG	Murfreesboro, TN	Oakland High School	5 ft 10 in (1.78 m)	160 lb (73 kg)	Apr 19, 2018
Keishawn Davidson; PG	Recruit ratings: Scout: Rivals: (NR)				
Overall recruit ranking:
Note: In many cases, Scout, Rivals, 247Sports, On3, and ESPN may conflict in their listings of height and weight.; In these cases, the average was taken. ESPN grades are on a 100-point scale.; Sources: "2019 Team Ranking". Rivals.

== Roster ==
2018–19 Middle Tennessee Blue Raiders men's basketball team
Players
Coaches

Pos.	#	Name	Height	Weight	Year	Previous school	Hometown
G	0	Anthony Crump	6 ft 8 in (2.03 m)	195 lb (88 kg)	Fr	Plymouth	Inkster, MI
G	1	Junior Faquhar	6 ft 2 in (1.88 m)	195 lb (88 kg)	Fr	Orangeville Prep	Mono, ON
F	2	DeAndre Dishman (redshirt)	6 ft 6 in (1.98 m)	215 lb (98 kg)	Jr	Bryan Station; Eastern Kentucky	Lexington, KY
G	3	Donovan Sims (W)	6 ft 1 in (1.85 m)	165 lb (75 kg)	So	Blackman	Murfreesboro, TN
F	4	James Hawthorne	6 ft 7 in (2.01 m)	210 lb (95 kg)	Sr	Prentiss; Southwest Mississippi CC	Prentiss, MS
G	10	Jayce Johnson	6 ft 5 in (1.96 m)	205 lb (93 kg)	Fr	Canisius	Buffalo, NY
G	14	Chase Miller (W)	6 ft 0 in (1.83 m)	185 lb (84 kg)	RS Jr	Shelton	Dallas, TX
F	15	T. J. Massenburg	6 ft 8 in (2.03 m)	220 lb (100 kg)	RS Fr	Shiloh	Snellville, GA
F	22	Reggie Scurry (redshirt)	6 ft 6 in (1.98 m)	235 lb (107 kg)	Sr	North Clayton; Missouri State	Atlanta, GA
G	23	C. J. Jones (redshirt)	6 ft 5 in (1.96 m)	170 lb (77 kg)	Jr	Central Park Christian; Arkansas	Birmingham, AL
G	24	Darnell Jr. Butler	6 ft 4 in (1.93 m)	215 lb (98 kg)	Jr	McCucheon; Seminole State College	Lafayette, IN
F	25	Karl Gamble	6 ft 9 in (2.06 m)	215 lb (98 kg)	Sr	A.C. Flora	Columbia, SC
G	55	Antonio Green (redshirt)	6 ft 2 in (1.88 m)	180 lb (82 kg)	Jr	Tupelo; Texas–Rio Grande Valley	Tupelo, MS

Head coach

- Nick McDevitt (UNC Asheville)

Assistant coach(es)

- Sean Dixon (Presbyterian)
- Wes Long (Clemson)
- Andre Morgan (North Georgia)

Legend

- (C) Team captain
- (S) Suspended
- (I) Ineligible
- (W) Walk-on
- Injured
- Current redshirt

Roster
Last update: February 28, 2025

== Schedule and results ==
Date time, TV	Rank^{#}	Opponent^{#}	Result	Record	High points	High rebounds	High assists	Site (attendance) city, state
Non-conference regular season
November 6, 2018*; 6:30 p.m.		Lees–McRae	W 91–69	1–0	24 – Green	11 – Scurry	3 – Sims	Murphy Center (3,255); Murfreesboro, TN
November 9, 2018*; 11:00 a.m.		Milligan	W 102–73	2–0	24 – Green	12 – Gamble	5 – Sims	Murphy Center (7,722); Murfreesboro, TN
November 12, 2018*; 7:00 p.m., ESPN3		at Belmont	L 73–92	2–1	20 – Gamble	8 – Gamble	2 – Gamble	Curb Event Center (2,148); Nashville, TN
November 16, 2018*; 6:30 p.m.		Charleston Southern; Battle 4 Atlantis campus-site game	W 76–73	3–1	22 – Green	6 – Green	5 – Crump	Murphy Center (3,945); Murfreesboro, TN
November 21, 2018*; 8:30 p.m., ESPN2		vs. No. 4 Virginia; Battle 4 Atlantis quarterfinals	L 52–74	3–2	11 – Green	6 – Hawthorne	5 – Sims	Imperial Arena (1,115); Nassau, Bahamas
November 22, 2018*; 8:30 p.m., ESPNU		vs. Butler; Battle 4 Atlantis	L 53–84	3–3	11 – Hawthorne	8 – Gamble	3 – Farquhar	Imperial Arena (953); Nassau, Bahamas
November 23, 2018*; 6:00pm, ESPNU		vs. Stanford; Battle 4 Atlantis	L 54–67	3–4	21 – Green	8 – Hawthorne	2 – Sims	Imperial Arena (1,087); Nassau, Bahamas
December 1, 2018*; 5:00 p.m.		Lipscomb	L 74–84	3–5	30 – Green	7 – Gamble	3 – Farquhar	Murphy Center (4,573); Murfreesboro, TN
December 5, 2018*; 6:30 p.m., SECN		at Vanderbilt	L 51–79	3–6	18 – Green	8 – Gamble	3 – Farquhar	Memorial Gymnasium (8,513); Nashville, TN
December 8, 2018*; 7:00 p.m., ESPN+		Murray State	L 42–64	3–7	12 – Johnson	9 – tied	1 – tied	Murphy Center (4,102); Murfreesboro, TN
December 15, 2018*; 6:00 p.m.		at Toledo	L 62–84	3–8	13 – tied	9 – Hawthorne	4 – Sims	Savage Arena (4,205); Toledo, OH
December 21, 2018*; 7:00 p.m., Facebook		Ole Miss; Battle at Bridgestone	L 56–74	3–9	22 – Green	7 – Johnson	2 – tied	Bridgestone Arena (11,294); Nashville, TN
December 30, 2018*; 4:00 p.m.		at Rhode Island	L 60–72	3–10	26 – Green	7 – tied	3 – tied	Ryan Center (6,382); Kingston, RI
Conference USA regular season
January 3, 2019; 6:30 p.m., ESPN+		FIU	L 76–83	3–11 (0–1)	23 – Green	11 – Gamble	5 – Johnson	Murphy Center (3,307); Murfreesboro, TN
January 5, 2019; 5:00 p.m., ESPN+		Florida Atlantic	L 56–63	3–12 (0–2)	20 – Green	8 – Scurry	6 – Sims	Murphy Center (3,422); Murfreesboro, TN
January 10, 2019; 7:00 p.m., ESPN+		at Southern Miss	L 70–77	3–13 (0–3)	28 – Sims	5 – tied	5 – Johnson	Reed Green Coliseum (1,987); Hattiesburg, MS
January 12, 2019; 4:00 p.m., ESPN+		at Louisiana Tech	L 56–73	3–14 (0–4)	13 – Scurry	7 – Gamble	7 – Sims	Thomas Assembly Center (3,894); Ruston, LA
January 17, 2019; 6:30 p.m., ESPN+		UTSA	W 89–86	4–14 (1–4)	24 – Sims	7 – Hawthorne	6 – Sims	Murphy Center (3,504); Murfreesboro, TN
January 19, 2019; 5:00 p.m.		UTEP	W 75–72	5–14 (2–4)	21 – Green	9 – Scurry	4 – tied	Murphy Center (3,806); Murfreesboro, TN
January 24, 2019; 7:00 p.m.		at Rice	L 68–79	5–15 (2–5)	22 – Scurry	12 – Scurry	3 – Green	Tudor Fieldhouse (1,375); Houston, TX
January 26, 2019; 5:00 p.m., ESPN+		at North Texas	L 53–70	5–16 (2–6)	15 – Scurry	5 – tied	5 – Sims	The Super Pit (3,418); Denton, TX
January 30, 2019; 6:30 p.m., ESPN+		UAB	W 71–65	6–16 (3–6)	19 – Sims	9 – Sims	4 – Sims	Murphy Center (3,963); Murfreesboro, TN
February 2, 2019; 7:00 p.m., ESPN+		at UAB	W 79–78	7–16 (4–6)	28 – Green	10 – Scurry	6 – Sims	Bartow Arena (4,075); Birmingham, AL
February 7, 2019; 6:30 p.m., ESPN+		Charlotte	W 71–53	8–16 (5–6)	21 – Green	7 – Hawthorne	5 – Sims	Murphy Center (3,303); Murfreesboro, TN
February 9, 2019; 6:00 p.m., Stadium		Old Dominion	L 50–55	8–17 (5–7)	14 – Sims	9 – Hawthorne	1 – Sims	Murphy Center (4,380); Murfreesboro, TN
February 14, 2019; 7:00 p.m., Facebook		at Western Kentucky	L 63–71	8–18 (5–8)	18 – Sims	11 – Hawthorne	3 – Hawthorne	E. A. Diddle Arena (6,044); Bowling Green, KY
February 16, 2019; 1:00 p.m., Facebook		at Marshall	L 93–98	8–19 (5–9)	31 – Green	10 – Gamble	2 – Green	Cam Henderson Center (6,927); Huntington, WV
February 23, 2019; 6:00 p.m.		Charlotte	W 86–67	9–19 (6–9)	21 – Green	7 – Hawthorne	5 – Green	Murphy Center (2,986); Murfreesboro, TN
March 3, 2019; 2:00 p.m.		at Rice	L 61–67	9–20 (6–10)	16 – Green	8 – Farquhar	4 – Farquhar	Tudor Fieldhouse (1,478); Houston, TX
March 6, 2019; 8:00 p.m.		at UTEP	W 69–53	10–20 (7–10)	26 – Green	13 – Johnson	4 – Farquhar	Don Haskins Center (4,748); El Paso, TX
March 9, 2019; 7:30 p.m.		UTEP	W 48–47	11–20 (8–10)	11 – Green	10 – Hawthorne	3 – Johnson	Murphy Center; Murfreesboro, TN
Conference USA tournament
March 13, 2019; 6:30 p.m., ESPN+	(12)	vs. (5) UAB; First round	L 61–70	11–21	22 – Sims	13 – Gamble	7 – Green	Ford Center at The Star (2,704); Frisco, TX
*Non-conference game. ^{#}Rankings from AP poll. (#) Tournament seedings in parentheses. All times are in Central.
