= 2018–19 FIU Panthers men's basketball team =

American college basketball season

2018–19 FIU Panthers men's basketball

CIT, Second round
- Conference: Conference USA
- Record: 20–14 (10–8 C-USA)
- Head coach: Jeremy Ballard (1st season)
- Assistant coaches: David Cason; Jesse Bopp; Joey Rodriguez
- Home arena: Ocean Bank Convocation Center

2018–19 Conference USA men's basketball standings
	Conf.				Overall
Team	W		L	PCT	W		L	PCT
Old Dominion †	13	–	5	.722	26	–	9	.743
Western Kentucky	11	–	7	.611	20	–	14	.588
Southern Miss	11	–	7	.611	20	–	13	.606
UTSA	11	–	7	.611	17	–	15	.531
UAB	10	–	8	.556	20	–	15	.571
Marshall	11	–	7	.611	23	–	14	.622
FIU	10	–	8	.556	20	–	13	.606
Louisiana Tech	9	–	9	.500	20	–	13	.606
Florida Atlantic	8	–	10	.444	17	–	16	.515
North Texas	8	–	10	.444	21	–	12	.636
Rice	8	–	10	.444	13	–	19	.406
Middle Tennessee	8	–	10	.444	11	–	21	.344
Charlotte	5	–	13	.278	8	–	21	.276
UTEP	3	–	15	.167	8	–	21	.276
† 2019 C-USA tournament winner

The 2018–19 FIU Panthers men's basketball team represented Florida International University during the 2018–19 NCAA Division I men's basketball season. The Panthers, led by first-year head coach Jeremy Ballard, played their home games at Ocean Bank Convocation Center in Miami, Florida as members of Conference USA.

== Previous season ==
The Panthers finished the 2017–18 season 14–18, 8–10 in C-USA play to finish in a tie for seventh place. They lost in the first round of the C-USA tournament to Southern Miss.

On April 2, 2018, FIU fired head coach Anthony Evans after five seasons. On April 20, the school announced VCU associate head coach Jeremy Ballard was hired as the new head coach.

== Offseason ==
=== Departures ===
Name	Number	Pos.	Height	Weight	Year	Hometown	Reason for departure
Josh Stamps	0	G	6'5"	180	Junior	Chicago, IL	Graduate transferred to LSU–Shreveport
Eric Lockett	5	G	6'5"	193	RS Junior	Atlanta, GA	Graduate transferred to NC State
Hassan Hussein	10	F	6'9"	205	RS Junior	Lorton, VA	Graduate transferred to Southern
Ronald Whitaker	23	G	6'7"	192	Senior	Washington, D.C.	Graduated
Jay Harvey	32	F	6'9"	246	RS Junior	Chicago, IL	Graduate transferred to South Dakota

=== Incoming transfers ===
Name	Number	Pos.	Height	Weight	Year	Hometown	Previous School
Marcus Burwell	11	G	6'3"	170	Junior	Richmond, VA	Junior college transferred from Northeastern JC
Cameron Corcoran	55	G	6'1"	170	Sophomore	Orlando, FL	Transferred from Little Rock. Under NCAA transfer rules, Corcoran will have to sit out in the 2018–19 season. Will have three years of eligibility left.

=== Recruiting class of 2018 ===
College recruiting information
Name	Hometown	School	Height	Weight	Commit date
Antonio Daye; PG	Durham, NC	Riverside High School	6 ft 0 in (1.83 m)	175 lb (79 kg)	Jun 17, 2018
Antonio Daye; PG	Recruit ratings: Scout: Rivals: (NR)				
Phillip Smith; SG	Potomac, MD	Bullis High School	6 ft 5 in (1.96 m)	170 lb (77 kg)	Jul 23, 2018
Phillip Smith; SG	Recruit ratings: Scout: Rivals: (NR)				
Overall recruit ranking:
Note: In many cases, Scout, Rivals, 247Sports, On3, and ESPN may conflict in their listings of height and weight.; In these cases, the average was taken. ESPN grades are on a 100-point scale.; Sources: "2018 Team Ranking". Rivals.

=== Recruiting class of 2019 ===
College recruiting information (2018)
Name	Hometown	School	Height	Weight	Commit date
Dante Wilcox; SF	West Palm Beach, FL	Oxbridge Academy	6 ft 6 in (1.98 m)	200 lb (91 kg)	Aug 29, 2018
Dante Wilcox; SF	Recruit ratings: Scout: Rivals: (NR)				
Overall recruit ranking:
Note: In many cases, Scout, Rivals, 247Sports, On3, and ESPN may conflict in their listings of height and weight.; In these cases, the average was taken. ESPN grades are on a 100-point scale.; Sources: "2019 Team Ranking". Rivals.

== Roster ==
2018–19 FIU Panthers men's basketball team
Players
Coaches

Pos.	#	Name	Height	Weight	Year	Previous school	Hometown
G/F	0	Phillip Smith	6 ft 4 in (1.93 m)	183 lb (83 kg)	Fr	Bullis School	Potomac, MD
G	1	Isaiah Banks	6 ft 5 in (1.96 m)	180 lb (82 kg)	So	Heritage	Conyers, GA
G	2	Cordell Veira	6 ft 4 in (1.93 m)	190 lb (86 kg)	So	John Polanyi Collegiate Inst	Etobicoke, ON
G	3	Trejon Jacob	6 ft 5 in (1.96 m)	175 lb (79 kg)	Jr	Millbrook; Seminole State College	Raleigh, NC
G	5	Brian Beard Jr.	6 ft 1 in (1.85 m)	188 lb (85 kg)	Fr	Fort Lauderdale	Durham, NC
G	11	Marcus Burwell	6 ft 2 in (1.88 m)	160 lb (73 kg)	Jr	Thomas Jefferson; Northeastern JC	Richmond, VA
G	20	Willy Nunez Jr.	6 ft 6 in (1.98 m)	185 lb (84 kg)	Sr	Oak Rige; Indian River State College	Orlando, FL
C	22	Elhadji Dieng	6 ft 11 in (2.11 m)	245 lb (111 kg)	Sr	Canarias Basketball Academy; Sheridan College/New Mexico JC	Mbour, Senegal
F	31	Michael Douglas	6 ft 5 in (1.96 m)	190 lb (86 kg)	Sr	Sachse	Sachse, TX
F	34	Osasumwen Osaghae	6 ft 7 in (2.01 m)	250 lb (113 kg)	Jr	Robert Morgan	Miami, FL
G	55	Cameron Corcoran (redshirt)	6 ft 1 in (1.85 m)	170 lb (77 kg)	Fr	Orlando Christian Prep; Little Rock	Orlando, Florida

Head coach

- Jeremy Ballard (Colgate)

Assistant coach(es)

- David Cason (Illinois State)
- Jesse Bopp (Plymouth State)
- Joey Rodriguez (VCU)

Legend

- (C) Team captain
- (S) Suspended
- (I) Ineligible
- (W) Walk-on
- Injured
- Current redshirt

Roster

== Schedule and results ==
Date time, TV	Rank^{#}	Opponent^{#}	Result	Record	Site (attendance) city, state
Non-conference regular season
Nov 7, 2018*; 7:00 pm		Webber International	W 110–84	1–0	Ocean Bank Convocation Center (877); Miami, FL
Nov 9, 2018*; 7:00 pm		Johnson & Wales	W 117–47	2–0	Ocean Bank Convocation Center (719); Miami, FL
Nov 13, 2018*; 7:00 pm		Milwaukee	W 86–83	3–0	Ocean Bank Convocation Center (773); Miami, FL
Nov 16, 2018*; 6:00 pm		at Fordham; John Bach Classic	L 77–83	3–1	Rose Hill Gymnasium (500); Bronx, NY
Nov 17, 2018*; 3:30 pm		vs. Columbia; John Bach Classic	W 98–87	4–1	Rose Hill Gymnasium (1,834); Bronx, NY
Nov 18, 2018*; 12:00 pm		vs. Youngstown State; John Bach Classic	W 102–93	5–1	Rose Hill Gymnasium (123); Bronx, NY
Nov 23, 2018*; 5:00 pm		Ave Maria; John Bach Classic	W 104–84	6–1	Ocean Bank Convocation Center (545); Miami, FL
Nov 28, 2018*; 7:30 pm		at Florida Gulf Coast	W 81–80	7–1	Alico Arena (2,328); Fort Myers, FL
Dec 1, 2018*; 8:00 pm, SECN+		at Arkansas	L 89–121	7–2	Bud Walton Arena (13,763); Fayetteville, AR
Dec 13, 2018*; 7:00 pm		North Florida	W 102–89	8–2	Ocean Bank Convocation Center (622); Miami, FL
Dec 18, 2018*; 7:00 pm		South Florida	L 73–82	8–3	Ocean Bank Convocation Center (706); Miami, FL
Dec 20, 2018*; 7:00 pm		Florida Memorial	W 108–67	9–3	Ocean Bank Convocation Center; Miami, FL
Dec 30, 2018*; 2:00 pm		at Ohio	L 66–68	9–4	Convocation Center (3,451); Athens, OH
Conference USA regular season
Jan 3, 2019; 7:30 pm, ESPN+		at Middle Tennessee	W 83–76	10–4 (1–0)	Murphy Center (3,307); Murfreesboro, TN
Jan 5, 2019; 8:00 pm, ESPN+		at UAB	L 65–84	10–5 (1–1)	Bartow Arena (2,878); Birmingham, AL
Jan 10, 2019; 7:00 pm		Charlotte	W 69–66	11–5 (2–1)	Ocean Bank Convocation Center (724); Miami, FL
Jan 12, 2019; 7:00 pm, ESPN+		Old Dominion	L 74–75	11–6 (2–2)	Ocean Bank Convocation Center (829); Miami, FL
Jan 17, 2019; 8:00 pm, beIN		at Western Kentucky	W 77–76	12–6 (3–2)	E. A. Diddle Arena (5,102); Bowling Green, KY
Jan 19, 2019; 7:00 pm, ESPN+		at Marshall	L 97–105	12–7 (3–3)	Cam Henderson Center (7,330); Huntington, WV
Jan 23, 2019; 7:00 pm		at Florida Atlantic	W 78–74	13–7 (4–3)	FAU Arena; Boca Raton, FL
Jan 26, 2019; 7:00 pm		Florida Atlantic	L 72–89	13–8 (4–4)	Ocean Bank Convocation Center; Miami, FL
Jan 31, 2019; 7:00 pm		Southern Miss	L 73–89	13–9 (4–5)	Ocean Bank Convocation Center; Miami, FL
Feb 2, 2019; 7:00 pm, ESPN+		Louisiana Tech	W 75–69	14–9 (5–5)	Ocean Bank Convocation Center; Miami, FL
Feb 7, 2019; 8:00 pm, ESPN+		at UTSA	L 67–100	14–10 (5–6)	Convocation Center; San Antonio, TX
Feb 9, 2019; 9:00 pm		at UTEP	L 75–85	14–11 (5–7)	Don Haskins Center; El Paso, TX
Feb 14, 2019; 7:00 pm		Rice	W 86–65	15–11 (6–7)	Ocean Bank Convocation Center; Miami, FL
Feb 16, 2019; 2:00 pm, ESPN+		North Texas	W 69–59	16–11 (7–7)	Ocean Bank Convocation Center; Miami, FL
Feb 23, 2019; 4:00 pm		at Florida Atlantic	W 79–76	17–11 (8–7)	FAU Arena (1,147); Boca Raton, FL
Mar 3, 2019; 12:00 pm		Louisiana Tech	W 83–76	18–11 (9–7)	Ocean Bank Convocation Center (519); Miami, FL
Mar 6, 2019; 7:00 pm, ESPN+		at Marshall	L 78–94	18–12 (9–8)	Cam Henderson Center (5,822); Huntington, WV
Mar 9, 2019; 7:00 pm		North Texas	W 73–58	19–12 (10–8)	Ocean Bank Convocation Center (652); Miami, FL
Conference USA tournament
Mar 13, 2019; ESPN+	(7)	vs. (10) North Texas; First round	L 57–71	19–13	Ford Center at The Star (2,704); Frisco, TX
CollegeInsider.com Postseason tournament
Mar 23, 2019*; 7:00 pm		at Texas State; First round	W 87–81	20–13	Strahan Coliseum (1,237); San Marcos, TX
Mar 26, 2019*; 8:00 pm		at Green Bay; Second round	L 68–98	20–14	Kress Events Center (1,341); Green Bay, WI
*Non-conference game. ^{#}Rankings from AP Poll. (#) Tournament seedings in parentheses. All times are in Eastern Time. Source
