= 2018–19 Old Dominion Monarchs men's basketball team =

American college basketball season

2018–19 Old Dominion Monarchs men's basketball

C-USA regular season & tournament champions

NCAA tournament, first round
- Conference: Conference USA
- Record: 26–9 (13–5 C-USA)
- Head coach: Jeff Jones (6th season)
- Assistant coaches: Kelvin Jefferson (3rd season); John Richardson (12th season); Bryant Stith (6th season)
- Home arena: Ted Constant Convocation Center

2018–19 Conference USA men's basketball standings
	Conf.				Overall
Team	W		L	PCT	W		L	PCT
Old Dominion †	13	–	5	.722	26	–	9	.743
Western Kentucky	11	–	7	.611	20	–	14	.588
Southern Miss	11	–	7	.611	20	–	13	.606
UTSA	11	–	7	.611	17	–	15	.531
UAB	10	–	8	.556	20	–	15	.571
Marshall	11	–	7	.611	23	–	14	.622
FIU	10	–	8	.556	20	–	13	.606
Louisiana Tech	9	–	9	.500	20	–	13	.606
Florida Atlantic	8	–	10	.444	17	–	16	.515
North Texas	8	–	10	.444	21	–	12	.636
Rice	8	–	10	.444	13	–	19	.406
Middle Tennessee	8	–	10	.444	11	–	21	.344
Charlotte	5	–	13	.278	8	–	21	.276
UTEP	3	–	15	.167	8	–	21	.276
† 2019 C-USA tournament winner

The 2018–19 Old Dominion Monarchs men’s basketball team represented Old Dominion University during the 2018–19 NCAA Division I men's basketball season. The Monarchs, led by sixth-year head coach Jeff Jones, played their home games at the Ted Constant Convocation Center in Norfolk, Virginia as members of Conference USA (C-USA). They finished the season 26–9, 13–5 to finish in 1st place. In the C-USA tournament, they defeated Louisiana Tech, UAB and Western Kentucky to win the C-USA tournament. As a result, they received an automatic bid to the NCAA tournament where they lost in the first round to Purdue.

== Previous season ==
The Monarchs finished the season 25–7, 15–3 in C-USA play, to finish in second place. They defeated Louisiana Tech in the quarterfinals of the C-USA tournament before losing to Western Kentucky in the semifinals. Despite winning 25 games on the season, the Monarchs did not participate in a postseason tournament.

== Offseason ==
=== Departures ===
Name	Number	Pos.	Height	Weight	Year	Hometown	Reason for departure
Greg McClinton	55	F	6'7"	200	RS Senior	Winston-Salem, NC	Graduated
Brandan Stith	25	F	6'7"	240	RS Senior	Lawrenceville, VA	Graduated
Stephen Vassor	23	F	6'7"	240	RS Senior	Lawrenceville, VA	Walk-on; Graduated
Randy Haynes	12	G	6'4"	215	Senior	Dumfries, VA	Graduated
Alassane Kah	1	F	6'9"	215	Senior	Columbus, OH	Graduated
Keith Pinckney	22	G	6'1"	180	Senior	Lithonia, GA	Graduated
Trey Porter	15	F	6'10"	230	RS Junior	Woodbridge, VA	Graduated and transferred to Nevada
Michael Hueitt Jr.	11	G	6'3"	160	Freshman	Fayetteville, NC	Transferred to UNC Greensboro

=== Incoming transfers ===
Name	Number	Pos.	Height	Weight	Year	Hometown	Previous school
Elbert Robinson III	25	C	7'1"	290	Senior	Garland, TX	Transferred from LSU. Will be eligible to play immediately since Robinson graduated from LSU.
Dajour Dickens	23	C	7'0"	220	Sophomore	Hampton, VA	Transferred from Providence. Dickens was granted a waiver from the NCAA and will be eligible immediately.
Anthony Oliver II	11	G	6'5"	200	RS Sophomore	Birmingham, AL	Transferred from Clemson. Mid-year transfer, had to sit out due to NCAA transfer.

=== 2018 recruiting class ===
College recruiting
Name	Hometown	School	Height	Weight	Commit date
Jason Wade; PG	Richmond, VA	Trinity Episcopal School	6 ft 5 in (1.96 m)	180 lb (82 kg)	Oct 11, 2017
Jason Wade; PG	Recruit ratings: Scout: Rivals: 247Sports: ESPN: (NR)				
Kalu Ezikpe; PF	Lawrenceville, GA	Discovery High School	6 ft 8 in (2.03 m)	220 lb (100 kg)	Nov 14, 2017
Kalu Ezikpe; PF	Recruit ratings: Scout: Rivals: 247Sports: ESPN: (NR)				
Joseph Reece; PF	St. Louis, MO	East St. Louis High School	6 ft 9 in (2.06 m)	190 lb (86 kg)	Nov 19, 2017
Joseph Reece; PF	Recruit ratings: Scout: Rivals: 247Sports: ESPN: (NR)				
Overall recruit ranking:
Note: In many cases, Scout, Rivals, 247Sports, On3, and ESPN may conflict in their listings of height and weight.; In these cases, the average was taken. ESPN grades are on a 100-point scale.; Sources: "Old Dominion 2018 Player Commits". ESPN.; "2018 Team Ranking". Rivals.

=== 2019 recruiting class ===
College recruiting (2019)
Name	Hometown	School	Height	Weight	Commit date
Jarvis Vaughan; PF	Staunton, VA	Robert E. Lee High School	6 ft 7 in (2.01 m)	200 lb (91 kg)	Oct 1, 2017
Jarvis Vaughan; PF	Recruit ratings: Scout: Rivals: 247Sports: ESPN: (NR)				
Overall recruit ranking:
Note: In many cases, Scout, Rivals, 247Sports, On3, and ESPN may conflict in their listings of height and weight.; In these cases, the average was taken. ESPN grades are on a 100-point scale.; Sources: "Old Dominion 2019 Player Commits". ESPN.; "2019 Team Ranking". Rivals.

== Honors and awards ==
Street & Smith's Preseason Awards

- All-Conference – Ahmad Caver
- All-Newcomer – Elbert Robinson III
- All-Defense – Ahmad Caver

== Roster ==
2018–19 Old Dominion Monarchs men's basketball team
Players
Coaches

Pos.	#	Name	Height	Weight	Year	Previous school	Hometown
G	0	Marquis Godwin	6 ft 5 in (1.96 m)	195 lb (88 kg)	So	Hampton HS	Hampton, VA
G	1	Jason Wade	6 ft 5 in (1.96 m)	205 lb (93 kg)	Fr	Trinity Episcopal School	Richmond, VA
G	2	Justice Kithcart	6 ft 1 in (1.85 m)	185 lb (84 kg)	RS So	Virginia Episcopal School / Pittsburgh	Durham, NC
G	3	B. J. Stith	6 ft 5 in (1.96 m)	205 lb (93 kg)	RS Sr	Brunswick HS / Virginia	Lawrenceville, VA
G	4	Ahmad Caver	6 ft 2 in (1.88 m)	175 lb (79 kg)	Sr	St. John's NW Military Academy (WI)	Atlanta, GA
G	10	Xavier Green	6 ft 6 in (1.98 m)	200 lb (91 kg)	RS So	Williamsburg Christian Academy	Williamsburg, VA
G	11	Anthony Oliver II (I) (redshirt)	6 ft 5 in (1.96 m)	200 lb (91 kg)	RS So	Daniel HS / Clemson	Birmingham, AL
G	12	Quishon Harris (W)	5 ft 10 in (1.78 m)	140 lb (64 kg)	Fr	Hampton HS	Hampton, VA
F	13	Aaron Carver	6 ft 7 in (2.01 m)	225 lb (102 kg)	RS Jr	South Kent School (CT)	Elizabeth City, NC
F	15	Joseph Reece	6 ft 8 in (2.03 m)	195 lb (88 kg)	Fr	East St. Louis HS	St. Louis, MO
G	20	Loren Brill (W)	6 ft 0 in (1.83 m)	185 lb (84 kg)	RS So	Georgetown Prep / Cal State Fullerton	Gaithersburg, MD
F	21	Alfis Pilavios	6 ft 6 in (1.98 m)	200 lb (91 kg)	So	Moraitis School	Athens, Greece
F	22	Kalu Ezikpe	6 ft 7 in (2.01 m)	245 lb (111 kg)	Fr	Discovery HS	Lawrenceville, GA
F	23	Dajour Dickens	7 ft 0 in (2.13 m)	215 lb (98 kg)	So	Bethel HS / Providence	Hampton, VA
C	25	Elbert Robinson III	7 ft 1 in (2.16 m)	285 lb (129 kg)	Sr	Lakeview Centennial HS / LSU	Garland, TX

Head coach

- Jeff Jones (Virginia '82)

Assistant coach(es)

- Kelvin Jefferson (Southern Connecticut State '95)
- John Richardson (Elizabeth City State '95)
- Bryant Stith (Virginia '92)

Legend

- (C) Team captain
- (S) Suspended
- (I) Ineligible
- (W) Walk-on
- Injured
- Current redshirt

Roster
Last update: July 9, 2024

== Schedule and results ==
Date time, TV	Rank^{#}	Opponent^{#}	Result	Record	High points	High rebounds	High assists	Site (attendance) city, state
Exhibition
November 1, 2018*; 7:00 p.m.		Virginia Wesleyan	W 83–54		28 – Caver	7 – Carver	5 – Caver	Ted Constant Convocation Center (5,376); Norfolk, VA
Non-conference regular season
November 6, 2018*; 7:00 p.m.		Navy	W 67–44	1–0	24 – Caver	8 – Stith	4 – Stith	Ted Constant Convocation Center (6,289); Norfolk, VA
November 9, 2018*; 7:30 p.m.		at Saint Joseph's	L 64–79	1–1	22 – Caver	11 – Stith	6 – Caver	Hagan Arena (4,084); Philadelphia, PA
November 16, 2018*; 1:00 p.m., FloHoops.com		vs. Oregon State; Paradise Jam quarterfinals	L 56–61	1–2	15 – Stith	6 – Stith	2 – Wade	Sports and Fitness Center (522); St. Thomas, USVI
November 17, 2018*; 4:00 p.m., FloHoops.com		vs. Kennesaw State; Paradise Jam	W 65–47	2–2	14 – Caver	10 – Stith	5 – Kithcart	Sports and Fitness Center; St. Thomas, USVI
November 19, 2018*; 3:00 p.m., FloHoops.com		vs. Northern Iowa; Paradise Jam	L 53–54	2–3	24 – Caver	11 – Stith	4 – Carver	Sports and Fitness Center; St. Thomas, USVI
November 23, 2018*; 7:00 p.m.		Northern Iowa	W 72–65	3–3	25 – Stith	7 – Carver	6 – Caver	Ted Constant Convocation Center (5,529); Norfolk, VA
November 28, 2018*; 7:00 p.m., MASN/ESPN3		VCU; Rivalry	W 62–52	4–3	21 – Stith	7 – Wade	4 – Caver	Ted Constant Convocation Center (8,172); Norfolk, VA
December 1, 2018*; 7:00 p.m., ESPN+		James Madison; Rivalry	W 67–42	5–3	28 – Stith	8 – Stith	8 – Caver	Ted Constant Convocation Center (6,982); Norfolk, VA
December 5, 2018*; 7:00 p.m., ESPN+		William & Mary; Rivalry	W 71–53	6–3	20 – tied	11 – Stith	5 – Caver	Ted Constant Convocation Center (6,501); Norfolk, VA
December 9, 2018*; 1:00 p.m.		Fairfield	W 79–69	7–3	28 – Stith	14 – Stith	12 – Caver	Ted Constant Convocation Center (4,297); Norfolk, VA
December 15, 2018*; 12:00 p.m., ACCRSN		at No. 25–T Syracuse	W 68–62	8–3	18 – Stith	10 – Stith	4 – Caver	Carrier Dome (17,585); Syracuse, NY
December 19, 2018*; 7:00 p.m., MASN/ESPN+		at Richmond	W 63–54	9–3	30 – Stith	12 – Stith	8 – Caver	Robins Center (5,617); Richmond, VA
December 22, 2018*; 2:00 p.m.		Morgan State	W 76–53	10–3	21 – Caver	20 – Carver	8 – Caver	Ted Constant Convocation Center (5,719); Norfolk, VA
Conference USA regular season
January 3, 2019; 7:00 p.m., Stadium		Marshall	L 67–70	10–4 (0–1)	27 – Stith	10 – Carver	9 – Caver	Ted Constant Convocation Center (6,153); Norfolk, VA
January 5, 2019; 7:00 p.m., Facebook		Western Kentucky	W 69–66	11–4 (1–1)	19 – Stith	12 – Stith	6 – Caver	Ted Constant Convocation Center (6,928); Norfolk, VA
January 10, 2019; 7:00 p.m., ESPN+		at Florida Atlantic	L 73–80	11–5 (1–2)	20 – Caver	8 – Wade	3 – Stith	FAU Arena (1,578); Boca Raton, FL
January 12, 2019; 7:00 p.m., ESPN+		at FIU	W 75–74	12–5 (2–2)	22 – Caver	8 – Carver	3 – Carver	Ocean Bank Convocation Center (829); Miami, FL
January 17, 2019; 7:00 p.m., ESPN+		Louisiana Tech	W 64–63	13–5 (3–2)	16 – Stith	8 – Stith	4 – Caver	Ted Constant Convocation Center (5,654); Norfolk, VA
January 19, 2019; 4:00 p.m., ESPN+		Southern Miss	W 78–60	14–5 (4–2)	19 – Caver	9 – Dickens	8 – Caver	Ted Constant Convocation Center (7,003); Norfolk, VA
January 21, 2019; 9:00 p.m., ESPN+		at Charlotte	W 76–70	15–5 (5–2)	22 – Stith	7 – Stith	4 – Caver	Dale F. Halton Arena (4,053); Charlotte, NC
January 24, 2019; 9:00 p.m., ESPN+		at UTEP	W 50–48	16–5 (6–2)	16 – Kithcart	9 – Carver	4 – Caver	Don Haskins Center (4,798); El Paso, TX
January 26, 2019; 4:00 p.m., ESPN+		at UTSA	L 73–74	16–6 (6–3)	23 – Stith	12 – Stith	5 – Wade	Convocation Center (1,334); San Antonio, TX
January 31, 2019; 7:00 p.m., Stadium		North Texas	W 72–61	17–6 (7–3)	13 – Kithcart	7 – Green	9 – Caver	Ted Constant Convocation Center (6,062); Norfolk, VA
February 2, 2019; 7:00 p.m., ESPN+		Rice	W 80–76	18–6 (8–3)	28 – Stith	7 – tied	11 – Caver	Ted Constant Convocation Center (7,805); Norfolk, VA
February 7, 2019; 8:00 p.m., ESPN+		at UAB	W 70–59	19–6 (9–3)	21 – tied	9 – Dickens	5 – Green	Bartow Arena (3,276); Birmingham, AL
February 9, 2019; 7:00 p.m., Stadium		at Middle Tennessee	W 55–50	20–6 (10–3)	20 – Stith	13 – Carver	2 – tied	Murphy Center (4,380); Murfreesboro, TN
February 16, 2019; 2:00 p.m., ESPN+		Charlotte	W 73–60	21–6 (11–3)	20 – Caver	8 – Caver	4 – Caver	Ted Constant Convocation Center (7,283); Norfolk, VA
February 23, 2019; 1:00 p.m., Stadium		Western Kentucky	W 67–63	22–6 (12–3)	22 – Green	8 – Carver	5 – Caver	Ted Constant Convocation Center (7,324); Norfolk, VA
February 28, 2019; 8:00 p.m., CBSSN		at UTSA	W 65–64	23–6 (13–3)	16 – Stith	12 – Stith	10 – Caver	Convocation Center (1,523); San Antonio, TX
March 6, 2019; 7:00 p.m., CBSSN/Facebook		Southern Miss	L 52–59	23–7 (13–4)	11 – tied	8 – Caver	5 – Caver	Ted Constant Convocation Center (8,215); Norfolk, VA
March 9, 2019; 3:00 p.m., CBSSN/Facebook		at UAB	L 50–64	23–8 (13–5)	21 – Caver	5 – tied	5 – Caver	Bartow Arena (2,868); Birmingham, AL
Conference USA tournament
March 14, 2019; 7:00 p.m., Stadium	(1)	vs. (8) Louisiana Tech; Quarterfinals	W 57–56	24–8	17 – Caver	11 – Stith	8 – Caver	Ford Center at The Star (4,024); Frisco, TX
March 15, 2019; 1:30 p.m., CBSSN	(1)	vs. (5) UAB; Semifinals	W 61–59	25–8	21 – Green	9 – Carver	5 – Caver	Ford Center at The Star; Frisco, TX
March 16, 2019; 8:30 p.m., CBSSN	(1)	vs. (2) Western Kentucky; Championship	W 62–56	26–8	16 – Green	8 – Carver	9 – Caver	Ford Center at The Star (3,017); Frisco, TX
NCAA tournament
March 21, 2019*; 9:50 p.m., TBS	(14 S)	vs. (3 S) No. 13 Purdue; First round	L 48–61	26–9	19 – Caver	10 – Stith	2 – Caver	XL Center (14,695); Hartford, CT
*Non-conference game. ^{#}Rankings from AP Poll. (#) Tournament seedings in parentheses. S=South. All times are in Eastern.
