= 2018–19 Charlotte 49ers men's basketball team =

American college basketball season

2018–19 Charlotte 49ers men's basketball
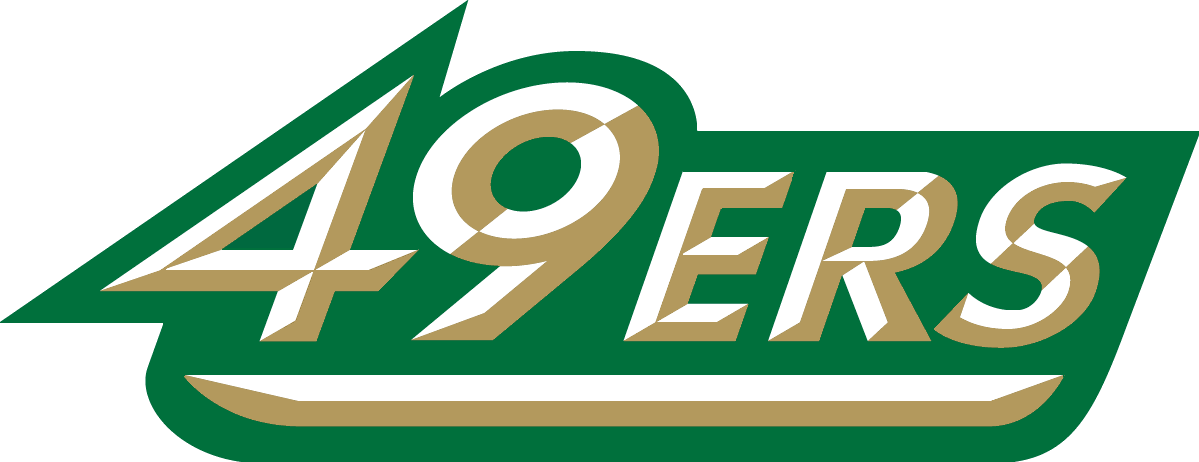
- Conference: Conference USA
- Record: 8–21 (5–13 C-USA)
- Head coach: Ron Sanchez (1st season)
- Assistant coaches: Aaron Fearne; Kotie Kimble; Vic Sfera
- Home arena: Dale F. Halton Arena

2018–19 Conference USA men's basketball standings
	Conf.				Overall
Team	W		L	PCT	W		L	PCT
Old Dominion †	13	–	5	.722	26	–	9	.743
Western Kentucky	11	–	7	.611	20	–	14	.588
Southern Miss	11	–	7	.611	20	–	13	.606
UTSA	11	–	7	.611	17	–	15	.531
UAB	10	–	8	.556	20	–	15	.571
Marshall	11	–	7	.611	23	–	14	.622
FIU	10	–	8	.556	20	–	13	.606
Louisiana Tech	9	–	9	.500	20	–	13	.606
Florida Atlantic	8	–	10	.444	17	–	16	.515
North Texas	8	–	10	.444	21	–	12	.636
Rice	8	–	10	.444	13	–	19	.406
Middle Tennessee	8	–	10	.444	11	–	21	.344
Charlotte	5	–	13	.278	8	–	21	.276
UTEP	3	–	15	.167	8	–	21	.276
† 2019 C-USA tournament winner

The 2018–19 Charlotte 49ers men's basketball team represented the University of North Carolina at Charlotte during the 2018–19 NCAA Division I men's basketball season. The 49ers, led by first year head coach Ron Sanchez, played their home games at the Dale F. Halton Arena as members of Conference USA.

== Previous season ==
The 49ers finished the 2017–18 season 6–23, 2–16 in C-USA play to finish in last place. They failed to qualify for the C-USA tournament.

On December 14, 2017, head coach Mark Price was fired after a 3–6 start to the season and was replaced by Fancher. Houston Fancher was named interim coach for the remainder of the season. On March 6, 2018, new athletic director Mike Hill fired Fancher. On March 19, 2018, the school hired Virginia associate head coach Ron Sanchez as their new head coach.

== Offseason ==
=== Departures ===
Name	Number	Pos.	Height	Weight	Year	Hometown	Reason for departure
Andrien White	2	G	6'3"	195	Junior	Richmond, VA	Transferred to Wake Forest
Austin Ajukwa	5	G	6'7"	210	RS Senior	Columbia, SC	Graduated
Corey Bias	10	G	6'1"	190	Senior	Milwaukee, WI	Graduated
Ryan Murphy	24	G	6'2"	190	RS Freshman	Calabasas, CA	Transferred to New Mexico JC

=== Incoming transfers ===
Name	Number	Pos.	Height	Weight	Year	Hometown	Previous
Jordan Shepherd		G	6'2"	180	Junior	Asheville, NC	Transferred from Oklahoma. Under NCAA transfer rules, Shepherd will have to sit out for the 2018–19 season. Will have two years of remaining eligibility.

=== 2018 recruiting class ===
College recruiting
Name	Hometown	School	Height	Weight	Commit date
Tyler Bertram; PG	Cooperstown, NY	Vermont Academy	6 ft 4 in (1.93 m)	160 lb (73 kg)	Sep 4, 2018
Tyler Bertram; PG	Recruit ratings: Scout: Rivals: (NR)				
Cooper Robb; PG	Georgetown, KY	Scott County High School	6 ft 2 in (1.88 m)	175 lb (79 kg)	Aug 1, 2017
Cooper Robb; PG	Recruit ratings: Scout: Rivals: (NR)				
Brandon Younger; SF	Marietta, GA	Wheeler High School	6 ft 6 in (1.98 m)	180 lb (82 kg)	Apr 8, 2018
Brandon Younger; SF	Recruit ratings: Scout: Rivals: (NR)				
Malik Martin; SG	Staten Island, NY	Curtis High School	6 ft 4 in (1.93 m)	190 lb (86 kg)	May 27, 2018
Malik Martin; SG	Recruit ratings: Scout: Rivals: (NR)				
Dravon Mangum; SF	Roxboro, NC	Person High School	6 ft 7 in (2.01 m)	N/A	Jul 28, 2017
Dravon Mangum; SF	Recruit ratings: Scout: Rivals: (NR)				
Overall recruit ranking:
Note: In many cases, Scout, Rivals, 247Sports, On3, and ESPN may conflict in their listings of height and weight.; In these cases, the average was taken. ESPN grades are on a 100-point scale.; Sources: "2018 Team Ranking". Rivals.

== Roster ==
2018–19 Charlotte 49ers men's basketball team
Players
Coaches

Pos.	#	Name	Height	Weight	Year	Previous school	Hometown
C	0	Jailan Haslem	6 ft 10 in (2.08 m)	260 lb (118 kg)	Sr	Gordon State College	Warner Robins, Georgia
F	1	Najee Garvin	6 ft 7 in (2.01 m)	220 lb (100 kg)	Jr	Moravian Prep Academy	Lexington, South Carolina
G	2	Jaylen McGill	6 ft 2 in (1.88 m)	200 lb (91 kg)	So	Olympic Community of Schools	Charlotte, North Carolina
G	3	Jon Davis	6 ft 3 in (1.91 m)	200 lb (91 kg)	Sr	Hargrave Military Academy	Upper Marlboro, Maryland
G	10	Cooper Robb	6 ft 1 in (1.85 m)	180 lb (82 kg)	Fr	Scott County High School	Georgetown, Kentucky
F	11	Bo Blight (W)	6 ft 7 in (2.01 m)	205 lb (93 kg)	RS So	South Mecklenburg High School	Charlotte, North Carolina
G	12	Malik Martin	6 ft 6 in (1.98 m)	205 lb (93 kg)	Fr	Curtis High School	Staten Island, New York
F	15	Milos Supica	6 ft 9 in (2.06 m)	220 lb (100 kg)	So	Freedom Christian Academy	Belgrade, Serbia
F	20	Dravon Mangum	6 ft 9 in (2.06 m)	200 lb (91 kg)	Fr	Person High School	Roxboro, North Carolina
G	22	Brandon Younger	6 ft 7 in (2.01 m)	185 lb (84 kg)	Fr	Wheeler High School	Marietta, Georgia
F	30	Bryant Thomas	6 ft 9 in (2.06 m)	210 lb (95 kg)	So	South Mecklenburg High School	Charlotte, North Carolina
G	35	Luka Vasic	6 ft 8 in (2.03 m)	200 lb (91 kg)	So	Avon Old Farms (Conn.)	Pirot, Serbia
G	55	Tyler Bertram	6 ft 3 in (1.91 m)	165 lb (75 kg)	Fr	Vermont Academy	Cooperstown, New York
G		Jordan Shepherd (redshirt)	6 ft 4 in (1.93 m)	185 lb (84 kg)	Jr	Oklahoma	Asheville, North Carolina

Head coach

- Ron Sanchez (SUNY Oneonta)

Assistant coach(es)

- Aaron Fearne (Mayville State)
- Kotie Kimble (Coastal Carolina)
- Vic Sfera (Memphis)

Legend

- (C) Team captain
- (S) Suspended
- (I) Ineligible
- (W) Walk-on
- Injured
- Current redshirt

Roster

== Schedule and results ==
Date time, TV	Rank^{#}	Opponent^{#}	Result	Record	Site (attendance) city, state
Non-conference regular season
Nov 6, 2018*; 7:00 pm, UNCC TV		Chattanooga	L 69–80	0–1	Dale F. Halton Arena (3,732); Charlotte, NC
Nov 10, 2018*; 4:00 pm, ESPN+		Oklahoma State	W 66–64	1–1	Dale F. Halton Arena (3,895); Charlotte, NC
Nov 16, 2018*; 7:30 pm, UNCC TV		James Madison	L 59–64	1–2	Dale F. Halton Arena (4,375); Charlotte, NC
Nov 19, 2018*; 7:00 pm		Longwood	W 42–39	2–2	Dale F. Halton Arena (3,740); Charlotte, NC
Nov 27, 2018*; 7:00 pm, ESPN+		at Davidson	L 56–76	2–3	John M. Belk Arena (3,736); Davidson, NC
Dec 1, 2018*; 4:00 pm		at College of Charleston	L 64–72	2–4	TD Arena (4,134); Charleston, SC
Dec 6, 2018*; 7:00 pm, ACCN Extra		at Wake Forest	L 56–80	2–5	LJVM Coliseum (5,248); Winston-Salem, NC
Dec 9, 2018*; 2:00 pm		South Florida	canceled		Dale F. Halton Arena; Charlotte, NC
Dec 18, 2018*; 7:30 pm, beIN		East Carolina	W 55–49	3–5	Dale F. Halton Arena (3,640); Charlotte, NC
Dec 23, 2018*; 12:30 am, ESPN3		vs. TCU; Diamond Head Classic Quarterfinals	L 57–82	3–6	Stan Sheriff Center; Honolulu, HI
Dec 24, 2018*; 12:30 am, ESPNU		vs. Rhode Island; Diamond Head Classic 2nd round consolation	L 61–75	3–7	Stan Sheriff Center; Honolulu, HI
Dec 25, 2018*; 1:00 pm, ESPNU		vs. Colorado; Diamond Head Classic 7th place game	L 53–68	3–8	Stan Sheriff Center; Honolulu, HI
Conference USA regular season
Jan 3, 2019; 7:30 pm, beIN		Western Kentucky	L 50–68	3–9 (0–1)	Dale F. Halton Arena (3,019); Charlotte, NC
Jan 5, 2019; 4:00 pm, ESPN+		Marshall	L 84–85	3–10 (0–2)	Dale F. Halton Arena (4,014); Charlotte, NC
Jan 10, 2019; 7:00 pm		at FIU	L 66–69	3–11 (0–3)	Ocean Bank Convocation Center (724); Miami, FL
Jan 12, 2019; 4:00 pm		at Florida Atlantic	W 65–60	4–11 (1–3)	FAU Arena (1,239); Boca Raton, FL
Jan 17, 2019; 7:00 pm, UNCC TV		Southern Miss	L 63–66	4–12 (1–4)	Dale F. Halton Arena (3,889); Charlotte, NC
Jan 19, 2019; 4:00 pm, UNCC TV		Louisiana Tech	W 55–40	5–12 (2–4)	Dale F. Halton Arena (3,998); Charlotte, NC
Jan 21, 2019; 4:00 pm, ESPN+		Old Dominion	L 70–76	5–13 (2–5)	Dale F. Halton Arena (4,053); Charlotte, NC
Jan 24, 2019; 8:00 pm, ESPN+		at UTSA	L 43–88	5–14 (2–6)	Convocation Center (1,260); San Antonio, TX
Jan 26, 2019; 9:00 pm, ESPN+		at UTEP	L 53–57	5–15 (2–7)	Don Haskins Center (4,856); El Paso, TX
Jan 31, 2019; 7:00 pm, UNCC TV		Rice	L 61–65	5–16 (2–8)	Dale F. Halton Arena (3,837); Charlotte, NC
Feb 2, 2019; 4:00 pm, ESPN+		North Texas	L 66–73	5–17 (2–9)	Dale F. Halton Arena (4,232); Charlotte, NC
Feb 7, 2019; 7:30 pm, ESPN+		at Middle Tennessee	L 53–71	5–18 (2–10)	Murphy Center (3,303); Murfreesboro, TN
Feb 9, 2019; 8:00 pm, ESPN+		at UAB	W 69–62	6–18 (3–10)	Bartow Arena (3,601); Birmingham, AL
Feb 16, 2019; 2:00 pm, ESPN+		at Old Dominion	L 60–73	6–19 (3–11)	Ted Constant Convocation Center (7,283); Norfolk, VA
Feb 23, 2019; 6:00 pm		at Middle Tennessee	L 67–86	6–20 (3–12)	Murphy Center (2,986); Murfreesboro, TN
Mar 3, 2019; 1:00 pm		UTEP	W 68–58	7–20 (4–12)	Dale F. Halton Arena (2,821); Charlotte, NC
Mar 6, 2019; 7:00 pm		Rice	L 70–79	7–21 (4–13)	Dale F. Halton Arena (2,513); Charlotte, NC
Mar 9, 2019; 8:00 pm		at Rice	W 78–70	8–21 (5–13)	Tudor Fieldhouse (1,884); Houston, TX
*Non-conference game. ^{#}Rankings from AP Poll/Coaches' Poll. (#) Tournament seedings in parentheses. All times are in Eastern Time. Source
