= 2019 Conference USA men's basketball tournament =

- Classification: Division I
- Season: 2018–19
- Teams: 12
- Site: Ford Center at The Star; Frisco, Texas
- Champions: Old Dominion (1st title)
- Winning coach: Jeff Jones (1st title)
- MVP: Xavier Green (Old Dominion)
- Television: Stadium, ESPN+, CBSSN

2018–19 Conference USA men's basketball standings
	Conf.				Overall
Team	W		L	PCT	W		L	PCT
Old Dominion †	13	–	5	.722	26	–	9	.743
Western Kentucky	11	–	7	.611	20	–	14	.588
Southern Miss	11	–	7	.611	20	–	13	.606
UTSA	11	–	7	.611	17	–	15	.531
UAB	10	–	8	.556	20	–	15	.571
Marshall	11	–	7	.611	23	–	14	.622
FIU	10	–	8	.556	20	–	13	.606
Louisiana Tech	9	–	9	.500	20	–	13	.606
Florida Atlantic	8	–	10	.444	17	–	16	.515
North Texas	8	–	10	.444	21	–	12	.636
Rice	8	–	10	.444	13	–	19	.406
Middle Tennessee	8	–	10	.444	11	–	21	.344
Charlotte	5	–	13	.278	8	–	21	.276
UTEP	3	–	15	.167	8	–	21	.276
† 2019 C-USA tournament winner

The 2019 Conference USA men's basketball tournament was the concluding event of the 2018–19 Conference USA (C-USA) men's basketball season. It was held from March 13–16, 2019 alongside the C-USA women's tournament in Frisco, Texas, at the Ford Center at The Star. In the first round and quarterfinals, two games were played simultaneously within the same arena, with the courts separated by a curtain. Old Dominion defeated Western Kentucky 62–56 in the championship game to win the tournament, and received the conference's automatic bid to the 2019 NCAA tournament. It was their first Conference USA title since joining the conference six years ago.

== Seeds ==
Only 12 conference teams play in the tournament. The top four teams receive a bye to the quarterfinals of the tournament. Teams are seeded within one of three groups. After each team had played 14 conference games, the teams were divided into groups based on conference record at that point in the season. The top five teams were placed in one group, the next five in a second group, and the bottom four in a final group. All teams were at that time locked into a seeding range that corresponded to their group—for example, the top five teams were assured the top five seeds. The remaining four conference games were played strictly within each group. The final seeding within each group is determined by overall conference record, with a tiebreaker system to seed teams with identical conference records. Only the top two teams within the bottom group enter the tournament.

Seed	School	Record	Tiebreaker
1	Old Dominion	13–5	
2	Western Kentucky	11–7	3–1 vs. Southern Miss/UTSA, 2–0 vs. Southern Miss
3	Southern Miss	11–7	2–2 vs. Western Kentucky/UTSA, 0–2 vs. Western Kentucky
4	UTSA	11–7	1–3 vs. Southern Miss/Western Kentucky
5	UAB	10–8	Clinched over Marshall on Feb 16.
6	Marshall	11–7	
7	FIU	10–8	
8	Louisiana Tech	9–9	
9	Florida Atlantic	8–10	4–0 vs. North Texas/Rice/MTSU
10	North Texas	8–10	3–2 vs. FAU/Rice/MTSU
11	Rice	8–10	2–3 vs. FAU/North Texas/MTSU, 0–3 vs. FAU/North Texas
12	Middle Tennessee	8–10	0–4 vs FAU/North Texas/Rice
DNQ	Charlotte	5–13	
DNQ	UTEP	3–15	

== Schedule ==
Rankings denote tournament seed.

Session	Game	Matchup	Score	Television
First round – Wednesday, March 13
1	1	No. 8 Louisiana Tech vs. No. 9 Florida Atlantic	57–56	ESPN+
1	2	No. 5 UAB vs. No. 12 Middle Tennessee	70–61	ESPN+
1	3	No. 7 FIU vs. No. 10 North Texas	57–71	ESPN+
1	4	No. 6 Marshall vs. No. 11 Rice	82–65	ESPN+
Quarterfinals – Thursday, March 14
2	5	No. 1 Old Dominion vs. No. 8 Louisiana Tech	57–56	Stadium
2	6	No. 4 UTSA vs. No. 5 UAB	76–85	Facebook
2	7	No. 2 Western Kentucky vs. No. 10 North Texas	67–51	Stadium
2	8	No. 3 Southern Miss vs. No. 6 Marshall	82–73	Facebook
Semifinals – Friday, March 15
3	9	No. 1 Old Dominion vs. No. 5 UAB	61–59	CBSSN
3	10	No. 2 Western Kentucky vs. No. 3 Southern Miss	70–59	CBSSN
Championship – Saturday, March 16
4	11	No. 1 Old Dominion vs. No. 2 Western Kentucky	62–56	CBSSN

== Bracket ==
First round Wednesday, March 13; ESPN+
8	Louisiana Tech	57
9	Florida Atlantic	56
5	UAB	70
12	Middle Tennessee	61
7	FIU	57
10	North Texas	71
6	Marshall	82
11	Rice	65

Quarterfinals; Thursday, March 14; Stadium/Facebook
1	Old Dominion	57
8	Louisiana Tech	56
4	UTSA	76
5	UAB	85
2	Western Kentucky	67
10	North Texas	51
3	Southern Miss	82
6	Marshall	73

Semifinals; Friday, March 15; CBSSN
1	Old Dominion	61
5	UAB	59
2	Western Kentucky	70
3	Southern Miss	59

Championship; Saturday, March 16; CBSSN
1	Old Dominion	62
2	Western Kentucky	56

* denotes overtime period.

== See also ==
- 2019 Conference USA women's basketball tournament
