= 2018–19 Rice Owls men's basketball team =

American college basketball season

2018–19 Rice Owls men's basketball
- Conference: Conference USA
- Record: 13–19 (8–10 C-USA)
- Head coach: Scott Pera (2nd season)
- Assistant coaches: Chris Kreider; Mark Linebaugh; Van Green
- Home arena: Tudor Fieldhouse

2018–19 Conference USA men's basketball standings
| | Conf. | | | | Overall |
| Team | W | | L | PCT | W | | L | PCT |
|---|---|---|---|---|---|---|---|---|
| Old Dominion † | 13 | – | 5 | .722 | 26 | – | 9 | .743 |
| Western Kentucky | 11 | – | 7 | .611 | 20 | – | 14 | .588 |
| Southern Miss | 11 | – | 7 | .611 | 20 | – | 13 | .606 |
| UTSA | 11 | – | 7 | .611 | 17 | – | 15 | .531 |
| UAB | 10 | – | 8 | .556 | 20 | – | 15 | .571 |
| Marshall | 11 | – | 7 | .611 | 23 | – | 14 | .622 |
| FIU | 10 | – | 8 | .556 | 20 | – | 13 | .606 |
| Louisiana Tech | 9 | – | 9 | .500 | 20 | – | 13 | .606 |
| Florida Atlantic | 8 | – | 10 | .444 | 17 | – | 16 | .515 |
| North Texas | 8 | – | 10 | .444 | 21 | – | 12 | .636 |
| Rice | 8 | – | 10 | .444 | 13 | – | 19 | .406 |
| Middle Tennessee | 8 | – | 10 | .444 | 11 | – | 21 | .344 |
| Charlotte | 5 | – | 13 | .278 | 8 | – | 21 | .276 |
| UTEP | 3 | – | 15 | .167 | 8 | – | 21 | .276 |
† 2019 C-USA tournament winner

The 2018–19 Rice Owls men's basketball team represented Rice University during the 2018–19 NCAA Division I men's basketball season. The Owls, led by second-year head coach Scott Pera, played their home games at Tudor Fieldhouse in Houston, Texas as members of Conference USA.

== Previous season ==
The Owls finished the 2017–18 season 7–24, 4–14 in C-USA play to finish in 13th place and failed to qualify for the C-USA tournament.

== Offseason ==
=== Departures ===
| Name | Number | Pos. | Height | Weight | Year | Hometown | Reason for departure |
|---|---|---|---|---|---|---|---|
| Connor Cashaw | 0 | G | 6'5" | 205 | Junior | Lincolnshire, IL | Graduate transferred to Creighton |
| A. J. Lapray | 2 | G | 6'5" | 190 | RS Senior | Salem, OR | Graduated |
| Miles Lester | 11 | G | 6'0" | 170 | Freshman | Wichita, KS | Transferred to Wake Forest |
| Malik Osborne | 13 | F | 6'8" | 200 | Freshman | Matteson, IL | Transferred to Florida State |
| Bishop Mency | 15 | G | 6'5" | 215 | Senior | Chino Hills, CA | Graduated |
| Grant Youngkin | 20 | G | 6'3" | 190 | Sophomore | Washington, D.C. | Walk-on; left the team for personal reasons |
| J. T. Trauber | 24 | G | 5'10" | 165 | Senior | Houston, TX | Walk-on; graduated |
| Austin Meyer | 30 | F | 6'9" | 235 | Sophomore | Pflugerville, TX | Transferred to Oklahoma State |

=== Incoming transfers ===
| Name | Number | Pos. | Height | Weight | Year | Hometown | Previous School |
|---|---|---|---|---|---|---|---|
| Jack Williams | 32 | F | 6'8" | 220 | RS Senior | Porter Ranch, CA | Transferred from Pacific. Will be eligible to play immediately since Williams graduated from Pacific. |

=== 2018 recruiting class ===
College recruiting information
| Name | Hometown | School | Height | Weight | Commit date |
|---|---|---|---|---|---|
| Chris Mullins #55 SG | Mansfield, TX | Timberview High School | 6 ft 2 in (1.88 m) | N/A | Aug 23, 2017 |
| Chris Mullins #55 SG | Recruit ratings: Scout: Rivals: 247Sports: (3) | | | | |
| Trey Murphy III; SG | Cary, NC | Cary Academy | 6 ft 4 in (1.93 m) | 165 lb (75 kg) | Nov 8, 2017 |
| Trey Murphy III; SG | Recruit ratings: Scout: Rivals: 247Sports: (0) | | | | |
| Quentin Millora-Brown; PF | Lorton, VA | Bishop O'Connell High School | 6 ft 9 in (2.06 m) | 205 lb (93 kg) | Nov 8, 2017 |
| Quentin Millora-Brown; PF | Recruit ratings: Scout: Rivals: 247Sports: (0) | | | | |
| Payton Moore; SG | Los Angeles, CA | Windward School | 6 ft 4 in (1.93 m) | 175 lb (79 kg) | Nov 8, 2017 |
| Payton Moore; SG | Recruit ratings: Scout: Rivals: 247Sports: (0) | | | | |
| Drew Peterson; SF | Libertyville, IL | Libertyville High Scoool | 6 ft 7 in (2.01 m) | 180 lb (82 kg) | Apr 10, 2018 |
| Drew Peterson; SF | Recruit ratings: Scout: Rivals: 247Sports: (0) | | | | |
Overall recruit ranking:
Note: In many cases, Scout, Rivals, 247Sports, On3, and ESPN may conflict in their listings of height and weight.; In these cases, the average was taken. ESPN grades are on a 100-point scale.; Sources: "2018 Team Ranking". Rivals.

=== 2019 recruiting class ===
College recruiting information (2019)
| Name | Hometown | School | Height | Weight | Commit date |
|---|---|---|---|---|---|
| Max Fiedler; C | Melbourne, FL | Melbourne High School | 6 ft 10 in (2.08 m) | 230 lb (100 kg) | Sep 16, 2018 |
| Max Fiedler; C | Recruit ratings: Scout: Rivals: 247Sports: (NR) | | | | |
| Zach Crisler; PF | Glenside, PA | La Salle College High School | 6 ft 9 in (2.06 m) | 210 lb (95 kg) | Sep 14, 2018 |
| Zach Crisler; PF | Recruit ratings: Scout: Rivals: 247Sports: (NR) | | | | |
| Quincy Olivari; PG | Atlanta, GA | Westlake High School | 6 ft 0 in (1.83 m) | 165 lb (75 kg) | Sep 17, 2018 |
| Quincy Olivari; PG | Recruit ratings: Scout: Rivals: 247Sports: (NR) | | | | |
Overall recruit ranking:
Note: In many cases, Scout, Rivals, 247Sports, On3, and ESPN may conflict in their listings of height and weight.; In these cases, the average was taken. ESPN grades are on a 100-point scale.; Sources: "2019 Team Ranking". Rivals.

== Roster ==
2018–19 Rice Owls men's basketball team
Players
Coaches

| Pos. | # | Name | Height | Weight | Year | Previous school | Hometown |
|---|---|---|---|---|---|---|---|
| G | 0 | Payton Moore | 6 ft 4 in (1.93 m) | 175 lb (79 kg) | Fr | Santa Monica High School | Los Angeles, California |
| G | 1 | Josh Parrish | 6 ft 5 in (1.96 m) | 210 lb (95 kg) | RS So | Seguin High School; TCU | Arlington, Texas |
| G | 2 | Trey Murphy III | 6 ft 7 in (2.01 m) | 180 lb (82 kg) | Fr | Cary Academy | Durham, North Carolina |
| G | 3 | Ako Adams | 6 ft 2 in (1.88 m) | 170 lb (77 kg) | So | Bishop Denis J. O'Connell High School | Washington, D.C. |
| F | 4 | Dylan Jones | 6 ft 8 in (2.03 m) | 215 lb (98 kg) | RS Sr | The Village School; Penn | Houston, Texas |
| G | 5 | Addison Owen (W) | 6 ft 5 in (1.96 m) | 185 lb (84 kg) | Jr | The Paideia School | Atlanta, Georgia |
| F | 10 | Robert Martin | 6 ft 6 in (1.98 m) | 220 lb (100 kg) | Jr | Tilton School | Pittsburgh, Pennsylvania |
| G/F | 23 | Drew Peterson | 6 ft 8 in (2.03 m) | 180 lb (82 kg) | Fr | Libertyville High School | Libertyville, Illinois |
| G | 24 | Chris Mullins | 6 ft 3 in (1.91 m) | 170 lb (77 kg) | Fr | Mansfield Timberview High School | Grand Prairie, Texas |
| G | 30 | Oliver Xu (W) | 6 ft 2 in (1.88 m) | 170 lb (77 kg) | RS Sr | Hong Kong International School | Hong Kong |
| F | 32 | Jack Williams | 6 ft 8 in (2.03 m) | 220 lb (100 kg) | RS Sr | Chaminade; Pacific | Porter Ranch, California |
| F | 35 | Tim Harrison | 6 ft 8 in (2.03 m) | 220 lb (100 kg) | So | Francis W. Parker School | San Diego, California |
| F | 42 | Quentin Millora-Brown | 6 ft 9 in (2.06 m) | 205 lb (93 kg) | Fr | South County High School | Lorton, Virginia |

Head coach

- Scott Pera (Penn State)

Assistant coach(es)

- Chris Kreider (Lebanon Valley)
- Mark Linebaugh (Colgate)
- Van Green (Rice)

Legend

- (C) Team captain
- (S) Suspended
- (I) Ineligible
- (W) Walk-on
- Injured
- Current redshirt

Roster

== Schedule and results ==
| Date time, TV | Rank^{#} | Opponent^{#} | Result | Record | Site (attendance) city, state |
Exhibition
| Nov 1, 2018*; 7:00 pm | | St. Thomas (TX) | W 90–76 | | Tudor Fieldhouse; Houston, TX |
Non-conference regular season
| Nov 6, 2018*; 7:00 pm | | Saint Leo | W 80–64 | 1–0 | Tudor Fieldhouse (1,368); Houston, TX |
| Nov 9, 2018*; 7:00 pm, ESPN+ | | at Penn | L 76–92 | 1–1 | Palestra (2,256); Philadelphia, PA |
| Nov 12, 2018*; 7:00 pm, CUSA.tv | | Alabama A&M; Men Against Breast Cancer Cup | W 73–59 | 2–1 | Tudor Fieldhouse (1,103); Houston, TX |
| Nov 14, 2018*; 7:00 pm, ESPN3 | | at Houston; Men Against Breast Cancer Cup | L 68–79 | 2–2 | H&PE Arena (3,952); Houston, TX |
| Nov 17, 2018*; 2:00 pm, ESPN3 | | Northwestern State; Men Against Breast Cancer Cup | W 102–74 | 3–2 | Tudor Fieldhouse (1,220); Houston, TX |
| Nov 21, 2018*; 8:00 pm, BYUtv | | at BYU; Men Against Breast Cancer Cup | L 78–105 | 3–3 | Marriott Center (11,631); Provo, UT |
| Nov 25, 2018*; 2:00 pm, Cox YurView/ESPN3 | | at Wichita State | L 61–90 | 3–4 | Charles Koch Arena (10,089); Wichita, KS |
| Nov 28, 2018*; 7:00 pm, ESPN+ | | at Texas State | L 60–74 | 3–5 | Strahan Coliseum (1,897); San Marcos, TX |
| Dec 1, 2018*; 4:30 pm | | Lamar | L 68–75 | 3–6 | Tudor Fieldhouse (1,926); Houston, TX |
| Dec 13, 2018*; 11:15 am | | St. Edward's | W 78–73 | 4–6 | Tudor Fieldhouse (4,786); Houston, TX |
| Dec 15, 2018*; 2:00 pm, ESPN+ | | UC Santa Barbara | L 89–99 ^{OT} | 4–7 | Tudor Fieldhouse (2,000); Houston, TX |
| Dec 18, 2018*; 7:00 pm | | at Texas–Rio Grande Valley | W 75–67 | 5–7 | UTRGV Fieldhouse (418); Edinburg, TX |
| Dec 21, 2018*; 7:00 pm | | Omaha | L 66–83 | 5–8 | Tudor Fieldhouse (1,276); Houston, TX |
Conference USA regular season
| Dec 29, 2018; 2:00 pm, ESPN+ | | North Texas | L 87–103 | 5–9 (0–1) | Tudor Fieldhouse (1,735); Houston, TX |
| Jan 3, 2019; 3:00 pm | | Southern Miss | W 73–65 | 6-9 (1-1) | Tudor Fieldhouse (1,108); Houston, TX |
| Jan 5, 2019; 2:00 pm | | Louisiana Tech | W 78–66 | 7–9 (2–1) | Tudor Fieldhouse (1,430); Houston, TX |
| Jan 10, 2019; 7:00 pm, ESPN+ | | at UTSA | L 79–95 | 7–10 (2–2) | Convocation Center (530); San Antonio, TX |
| Jan 12, 2019; 8:00 pm | | at UTEP | L 64–65 | 7–11 (2–3) | Don Haskins Center (4,345); El Paso, TX |
| Jan 19, 2019; 5:00 pm, ESPN+ | | at North Texas | L 75–76 | 7–12 (2–4) | The Super Pit (3,728); Denton, TX |
| Jan 24, 2019; 7:00 pm | | Middle Tennessee | W 79–68 | 8–12 (3–4) | Tudor Fieldhouse (1,375); Houston, TX |
| Jan 26, 2019; 7:00 pm, ESPN+ | | UAB | L 86–89 | 8–13 (3–5) | Tudor Fieldhouse (1,731); Houston, TX |
| Jan 31, 2019; 6:00 pm | | at Charlotte | W 65–61 | 9–13 (4–5) | Dale F. Halton Arena (3,837); Charlotte, NC |
| Feb 2, 2019; 8:00 pm, ESPN+ | | at Old Dominion | L 76–80 | 9–14 (4–6) | Ted Constant Convocation Center (7,805); Norfolk, VA |
| Feb 7, 2019; 8:00 pm, CBSSN | | Western Kentucky | L 85–92 ^{2OT} | 9–15 (4–7) | Tudor Fieldhouse (1,757); Houston, TX |
| Feb 9, 2019; 7:00 pm, ESPN+ | | Marshall | W 74–69 | 10–15 (5–7) | Tudor Fieldhouse (2,910); Houston, TX |
| Feb 14, 2019; 6:00 pm | | at FIU | L 65–86 | 10–16 (5–8) | Ocean Bank Convocation Center (785); Miami, FL |
| Feb 16, 2019; 1:00 pm | | at Florida Atlantic | L 41–60 | 10–17 (5–9) | FAU Arena (1,389); Boca Raton, FL |
| Feb 23, 2019; 8:00 pm | | UTEP | W 85-81 ^{2OT} | 11–17 (6–9) | Don Haskins Center (5,071); El Paso, TX |
| Mar 3, 2019; 2:00 pm | | Middle Tennessee | W 67–61 | 12–17 (7–9) | Tudor Fieldhouse (1,478); Houston, TX |
| Mar 6, 2019; 6:00 pm | | at Charlotte | W 79–70 | 13–17 (8–9) | Dale F. Halton Arena (2,513); Charlotte, NC |
| Mar 9, 2019; 7:00 pm | | Charlotte | L 70–78 | 13–18 (8–10) | Tudor Fieldhouse (1,884); Houston, TX |
Conference USA tournament
| Mar 13, 2019; 9:00 pm, ESPN+ | (11) | vs. (6) Marshall; First round | L 65–82 | 13–19 | Ford Center at The Star (2,704); Frisco, TX |
*Non-conference game. ^{#}Rankings from AP Poll. (#) Tournament seedings in parentheses. All times are in Central Time.

== See also ==
- 2018–19 Rice Owls women's basketball team
