= 2018–19 North Texas Mean Green men's basketball team =

American college basketball season

2018–19 North Texas Mean Green men's basketball
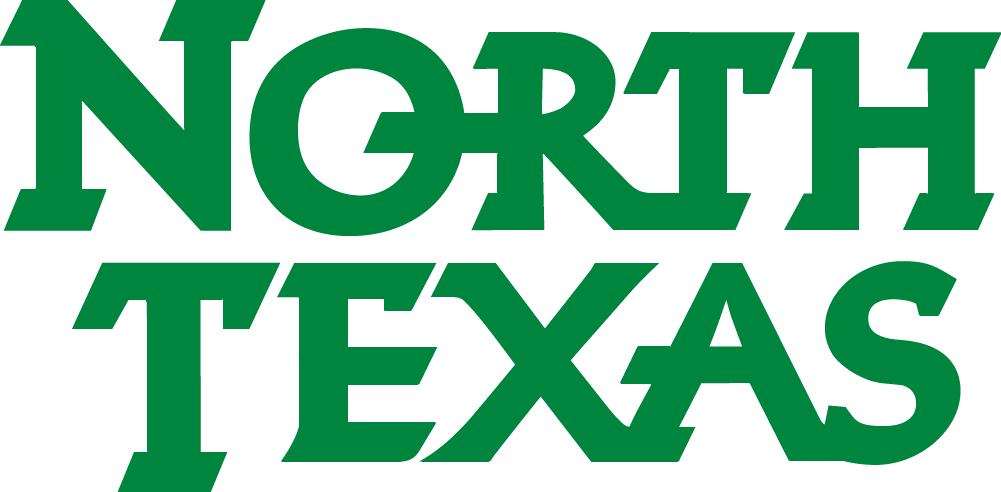

Outrigger Hotels Rainbow Classic Champions
- Conference: Conference USA
- Record: 21–12 (8–10 C-USA)
- Head coach: Grant McCasland (2nd season)
- Assistant coaches: Ross Hodge; Jareem Dowling; Matt Braeuer
- Home arena: The Super Pit

2018–19 Conference USA men's basketball standings
	Conf.				Overall
Team	W		L	PCT	W		L	PCT
Old Dominion †	13	–	5	.722	26	–	9	.743
Western Kentucky	11	–	7	.611	20	–	14	.588
Southern Miss	11	–	7	.611	20	–	13	.606
UTSA	11	–	7	.611	17	–	15	.531
UAB	10	–	8	.556	20	–	15	.571
Marshall	11	–	7	.611	23	–	14	.622
FIU	10	–	8	.556	20	–	13	.606
Louisiana Tech	9	–	9	.500	20	–	13	.606
Florida Atlantic	8	–	10	.444	17	–	16	.515
North Texas	8	–	10	.444	21	–	12	.636
Rice	8	–	10	.444	13	–	19	.406
Middle Tennessee	8	–	10	.444	11	–	21	.344
Charlotte	5	–	13	.278	8	–	21	.276
UTEP	3	–	15	.167	8	–	21	.276
† 2019 C-USA tournament winner

The 2018–19 North Texas Mean Green men's basketball team represented the University of North Texas during the 2018–19 NCAA Division I men's basketball season. The Mean Green, led by second-year head coach Grant McCasland, played their home games at UNT Coliseum, nicknamed The Super Pit, in Denton, Texas, as members of Conference USA.

== Previous season ==
The Mean Green finished the 2017–18 season 20–18, 8–10 in C-USA play to finish in a tie for seventh place. They lost in the first round of the C-USA tournament to Louisiana Tech. They were invited to participate in the College Basketball Invitational where they defeated South Dakota, Mercer, and Jacksonville State to advance to the best-of-three finals series against San Francisco. After losing in game 1, they won games 2 and 3 to become CBI champions. They also had the biggest crowd since 2010 at 6,291.

== Departures ==
Name	Number	Pos.	Height	Weight	Year	Hometown	Reason for departure
A. J. Lawson	1	G	6'5"	195	Sophomore	Bryan, TX	Transferred to McNeese State
Allante Holston	5	G	6'7"	190	Junior	Capitol Heights, MD	Graduate transferred to Indiana State
Bryce Jackson	14	F	6'6"	210	Senior	Keller, TX	Walk-on; graduated
Khalil Fuller	22	F	6'8"	260	RS Sophomore	Moreno Valley, CA	Graduate transferred to Cal State San Marcos
Shane Temara	50	F	6'9"	225	Senior	Syracuse, NY	Graduated

=== Incoming transfers ===
Name	Number	Pos.	Height	Weight	Year	Hometown	Previous School
Abdul Mohamed	5	G	6'7"	190	Junior	Ottawa, ON	Junior college transferred from Gillette College
J.J. Murray	11	G	6'1"	180	Junior	Rowlett, TX	Junior college transferred from Eastfield College. Will join the team as a walk-on.

== Recruiting class of 2018 ==
College recruiting
Name	Hometown	School	Height	Weight	Commit date
Larry Wise; SG	Waxahachie, TX	Waxahachie High School	6 ft 5 in (1.96 m)	175 lb (79 kg)	May 8, 2018
Larry Wise; SG	Recruit ratings: Scout: Rivals: (0)				
Shakeem Alcindor; SF	Saint Croix, Virgin Islands	Link Year Preparatory School	6 ft 8 in (2.03 m)	220 lb (100 kg)	Jul 11, 2018
Shakeem Alcindor; SF	Recruit ratings: Scout: Rivals: (0)				
Overall recruit ranking:
Note: In many cases, Scout, Rivals, 247Sports, On3, and ESPN may conflict in their listings of height and weight.; In these cases, the average was taken. ESPN grades are on a 100-point scale.; Sources: "2018 Team Ranking". Rivals.

=== Recruiting class of 2019 ===
College recruiting (2019)
Name	Hometown	School	Height	Weight	Commit date
Jalen Jackson; PG	San Antonio, TX	Karen Wagner High School	5 ft 10 in (1.78 m)	155 lb (70 kg)	May 7, 2018
Jalen Jackson; PG	Recruit ratings: Scout: Rivals: 247Sports: (0)				
Overall recruit ranking:
Note: In many cases, Scout, Rivals, 247Sports, On3, and ESPN may conflict in their listings of height and weight.; In these cases, the average was taken. ESPN grades are on a 100-point scale.; Sources: "2018 Team Ranking". Rivals.

== Roster ==
2018–19 North Texas Mean Green men's basketball team
Players
Coaches

Pos.	#	Name	Height	Weight	Year	Previous school	Hometown
G	0	Ryan Woolridge	6 ft 3 in (1.91 m)	175 lb (79 kg)	RS Jr	Lake Ridge HS; San Diego	Mansfield, TX
G	1	Umoja Gibson	6 ft 1 in (1.85 m)	160 lb (73 kg)	RS Fr	University HS	Waco, TX
G	2	Jorden Duffy	6 ft 1 in (1.85 m)	170 lb (77 kg)	Sr	James M. Bennett HS; San Jacinto College	Salisbury, MD
G	3	Roosevelt Smart	6 ft 3 in (1.91 m)	185 lb (84 kg)	Jr	Sunrise Christian Academy; New Mexico JC	Chicago, IL
G	5	Abdul Mohamed	6 ft 7 in (2.01 m)	190 lb (86 kg)	Jr	Bell HS; Gillette College	Ottawa, ON
F	10	Jahmiah Simmons	6 ft 4 in (1.93 m)	205 lb (93 kg)	RS So	Pace HS; Arkansas State	St. Thomas, Virgin Islands
G	11	J. J. Murray (W)	6 ft 1 in (1.85 m)	180 lb (82 kg)	Jr	Rowlett HS; Eastfield College	Rowlett, TX
F	13	Mark Tikhonenko	6 ft 10 in (2.08 m)	210 lb (95 kg)	RS Fr	Mt. Zion Prep	Moscow, Russia
F	20	Tope Arikawe	6 ft 8 in (2.03 m)	220 lb (100 kg)	Sr	Covenant Christian; Panola College	Lagos, Nigeria
G	22	Larry Wise	6 ft 5 in (1.96 m)	185 lb (84 kg)	Fr	Waxahachie HS	Waxahachie, TX
G	23	Michael Miller	6 ft 3 in (1.91 m)	170 lb (77 kg)	Sr	Michigan City HS; Shawnee CC	Michigan City, IN
F	24	Zachary Simmons	6 ft 9 in (2.06 m)	235 lb (107 kg)	So	Cedar Hill HS	Abilene, TX
F	35	Shakeem Alcindor	6 ft 8 in (2.03 m)	215 lb (98 kg)	Fr	Link Year Prep	Saint Croix, Virgin Islands
G	55	D. J. Draper (W)	5 ft 10 in (1.78 m)	165 lb (75 kg)	RS Jr	Birdville HS	Beford, TX

Head coach

- Grant McCasland (Baylor)

Assistant coach(es)

- Ross Hodge (East Texas A&M)
- Jareem Dowling (Maryland Eastern Shore)
- Matt Braeuer (Wichita State)

Legend

- (C) Team captain
- (S) Suspended
- (I) Ineligible
- (W) Walk-on
- Injured
- Current redshirt

Roster

== Schedule and results ==
Date time, TV	Rank^{#}	Opponent^{#}	Result	Record	Site (attendance) city, state
Non-conference regular season
Nov 6, 2018*; 7:00 pm, CUSA.tv		Angelo State	W 89–55	1–0	The Super Pit (1,205); Denton, TX
Nov 9, 2018*; 9:30 pm		vs. Humboldt State; Outrigger Hotels Rainbow Classic	W 93–48	2–0	Stan Sheriff Center; Honolulu, HI
Nov 10, 2018*; 9:30 pm		vs. Portland; Outrigger Hotels Rainbow Classic	W 78–73	3–0	Stan Sheriff Center; Honolulu, HI
Nov 11, 2018*; 11:00 pm, BigWest TV		at Hawaii; Outrigger Hotels Rainbow Classic	W 68–51	4–0	Stan Sheriff Center (5,037); Honolulu, HI
Nov 14, 2018*; 7:00 pm, CUSA.tv		Texas A&M–Commerce	W 102–53	5–0	The Super Pit (2,530); Denton, TX
Nov 17, 2018*; 5:00 pm		UMES; Wolfpack Classic	W 68–34	6–0	The Super Pit (2,226); Denton, TX
Nov 20, 2018*; 7:00 pm		Maine; Wolfpack Classic	W 74–63 ^{OT}	7–0	The Super Pit (2,358); Denton, TX
Nov 24, 2018*; 4:00 pm		Saint Peter's; Wolfpack Classic	W 75–66	8–0	The Super Pit (2,031); Denton, TX
Nov 27, 2018*; 7:00 pm, FSOK		at Oklahoma	L 57–73	8–1	Lloyd Noble Center (6,553); Norman, OK
Dec 5, 2018*; 6:00 pm, ESPN3		at Indiana State	W 80–69	9–1	Hulman Center (3,113); Terre Haute, IN
Dec 8, 2018*; 5:00 pm		UT Arlington	W 63–61	10–1	The Super Pit (4,275); Denton, TX
Dec 18, 2018*; 8:00 pm		at New Mexico	W 74–65	11–1	Dreamstyle Arena (9,994); Albuquerque, NM
Dec 20, 2018*; 7:00 pm		Arkansas–Pine Bluff	W 77–66	12–1	The Super Pit (2,351); Denton, TX
Conference USA regular season
Dec 29, 2018; 2:00 pm, ESPN+		at Rice	W 103–87	13–1 (1–0)	Tudor Fieldhouse (1,735); Houston, TX
Jan 3, 2019; 7:00 pm, ESPN+		Louisiana Tech	W 63-59	14–1 (2–0)	The Super Pit (4,238); Denton, TX
Jan 5, 2019; 5:00 pm, ESPN+		Southern Miss	W 65–62	15–1 (3–0)	The Super Pit (3,267); Denton, TX
Jan 10, 2019; 8:00 pm, ESPN+		at UTEP	W 58–51	16–1 (4–0)	Don Haskins Center (4,451); El Paso, TX
Jan 12, 2019; 3:00 pm, ESPN+		at UTSA	L 74–76	16–2 (4–1)	Convocation Center (1,192); San Antonio, TX
Jan 19, 2019; 5:00 pm, ESPN+		Rice	W 76–75	17–2 (5–1)	The Super Pit (3,728); Denton, TX
Jan 24, 2019; 7:00 pm, beIN		UAB	L 49–52	17–3 (5–2)	The Super Pit (4,368); Denton, TX
Jan 26, 2019; 5:00 pm, ESPN+		Middle Tennessee	W 70–53	18–3 (6–2)	The Super Pit (3,418); Denton, TX
Jan 31, 2019; 6:00 pm, Stadium		at Old Dominion	L 61–72	18–4 (6–3)	Ted Constant Convocation Center (921); Norfolk, VA
Feb 2, 2019; 3:00 pm, ESPN+		at Charlotte	W 73–66	19–4 (7–3)	Dale F. Halton Arena (1,510); Charlotte, NC
Feb 7, 2019; 7:00 pm, beIN		Marshall	W 78–51	20–4 (8–3)	The Super Pit (4,646); Denton, TX
Feb 9, 2019; 5:00 pm, Facebook		Western Kentucky	L 59–62	20–5 (8–4)	The Super Pit (2,111); Denton, TX
Feb 14, 2019; 6:00 pm, ESPN+		at Florida Atlantic	L 47–57	20–6 (8–5)	FAU Arena (853); Boca Raton, FL
Feb 16, 2019; 6:00 pm, ESPN+		at FIU	L 59–69	20–7 (8–6)	Ocean Bank Convocation Center (1,389); Miami, FL
Feb 23, 2019; 7:00 pm		at Louisiana Tech	L 53–66	20–8 (8–7)	Thomas Assembly Center (1,147); Ruston, LA
Feb 28, 2019; 7:00 pm		Florida Atlantic	L 54–60	20–9 (8–8)	The Super Pit (3,044); Denton, TX
Mar 3, 2019; 3:00 pm		Marshall	L 82–85	20–10 (8–9)	The Super Pit (3,108); Denton, TX
Mar 9, 2019; 6:00 pm		FIU	L 58–73	20–11 (8–10)	Ocean Bank Convocation Center; Miami, FL
Conference USA tournament
Mar 13, 2019; 8:30 pm, ESPN+	(10)	vs. (7) FIU; First Round	W 71–57	21–11	Ford Center at The Star (2,704); Frisco, TX
Mar 13, 2019; 8:30 pm	(10)	vs. (2) Western Kentucky; Quarterfinals	L 51–67	21–12	Ford Center at The Star; Frisco, TX
*Non-conference game. ^{#}Rankings from AP Poll. (#) Tournament seedings in parentheses. All times are in Central Time.

== See also ==
- 2018–19 North Texas Mean Green women's basketball team
