= Jeremy Ballard =

American basketball player and coach (born 1981)

Current position
- Title: Assistant Coach
- Team: Marquette Golden Eagles
- Conference: Big East Conference

Biographical details
- Born: June 29, 1981 (age 45); Atlanta, Georgia, U.S.
- Education: Colgate University (2003)

Playing career
- 1999–2003: Colgate

Coaching career (HC unless noted)
- 2004–2007: Colgate (assistant)
- 2007–2012: Tulsa (assistant)
- 2012–2015: VCU (assistant)
- 2015–2016: Illinois State (assistant)
- 2016–2017: Pittsburgh (assistant)
- 2017–2018: VCU (assistant)
- 2018–2026: FIU
- 2026-present: Marquette (assistant)

Head coaching record
- Overall: 113–141 (.445)
- Tournaments: 1–1 (CIT)

Jeremy Ballard (born June 29, 1981) is an American college basketball coach who is currently an assistant coach at Marquette University. He was previously the head men's basketball coach at Florida International University.

== Playing career ==
Ballard played college basketball at Colgate, where he was a two-time Patriot League Academic Honor Roll selection, and served as team captain his senior year.

== Coaching career ==
=== Assistant coach (2004–2018) ===
After graduation, Ballard became an assistant coach with his alma mater, where he stayed from 2004 to 2007 before joining the staff at Tulsa from 2007 to 2012. Ballard moved on to be an assistant coach under Shaka Smart at VCU until 2015, before making stops at Illinois State and Pittsburgh for one season each. He returned to VCU as an assistant coach under Mike Rhoades in 2017.

=== Florida International (2018–2026) ===
Ballard accepted the head coaching position at Florida International on April 20, 2018, replacing Anthony Evans as the ninth coach in program history.

Ballard's teams posted a losing record every season from 2020–2026, and he was subsequently fired in March 2026.

=== Return to assistant coaching (2026–present) ===
On April 7, 2026, Marquette head coach Shaka Smart announced that Ballard would be joining his staff as an assistant coach. Ballard had previously assisted Smart at VCU.

== Head coaching record ==
Record table
Season	Team	Overall	Conference	Standing	Postseason
FIU Panthers (Conference USA) (2018–2026)
2018–19	FIU	20–14	10–8	7th	CIT Second Round
2019–20	FIU	19–13	9–9	T–6th	
2020–21	FIU	9–17	2–15	7th (East)	
2021–22	FIU	15–17	5–13	6th (East)	
2022–23	FIU	14–18	8–12	T–6th	
2023–24	FIU	11–22	5–11	9th	
2024–25	FIU	10–23	3–15	10th	
2025–26	FIU	15–17	8–12	T–8th	
FIU:		113–141 (.445)	50–94 (.347)		
Total:		113–141 (.445)			

== Personal life ==
He is a devoted member of the young male's mentoring group known as "the Commission" which prides itself on the development of young men in highly competitive academic environments.
