= Scott Pera =

American basketball coach (born 1967)

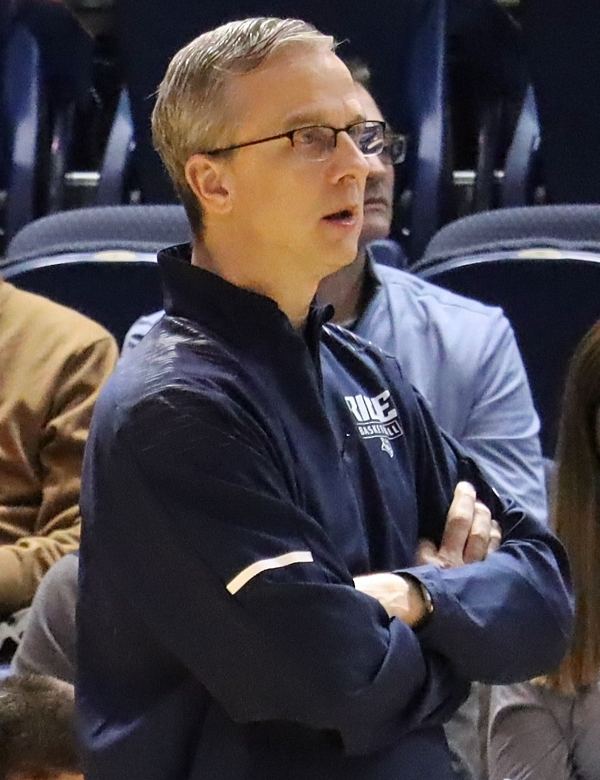
- Pera with Rice in 2022

Biographical details
- Born: August 27, 1967 (age 59); Hershey, Pennsylvania, U.S.
- Education: Penn State Harrisburg ('89)

Coaching career (HC unless noted)
- 1992–1993: Elizabethtown College (assistant)
- 1993–1995: Palmyra HS (PA)
- 1995–2000: Annville-Cleona HS (PA)
- 2000–2006: Artesia HS (CA)
- 2006–2012: Arizona State (assistant)
- 2012–2014: Penn (assistant)
- 2014–2017: Rice (assistant)
- 2017–2024: Rice

Administrative career (AD unless noted)
- 2025–present: Penn State (GM)

Head coaching record
- Overall: 96–127 (.430) (college)
- Tournaments: 1–2 (CBI)

Scott Pera (born August 27, 1967) is an American college basketball coach, currently serving as the General Manager for the Penn State Nittany Lions men's basketball team.

== Coaching career ==
Pera began his coaching career at Elizabethtown College in 1992, before transitioning to high school coaching in Pennsylvania and California, most notably at Artesia High School, where he coached James Harden. In his high school coaching career, Pera compiled a 258–65 record.

In the college ranks, Pera joined Herb Sendek's staff at Arizona State, where he began as the director of basketball operations before being elevated to assistant coach. From 2012 to 2014, Pera was an Assistant Coach at Penn under Jerome Allen. In 2014, he joined Mike Rhoades' staff at Rice, and when Rhoades left for VCU, Pera was elevated to the head coaching position to be the 25th coach in Owls history. During Pera's time at Rice, he made two CBIs and produced one NBA player, Trey Murphy III. After taking one year off after the 2024 season, Pera joined Mike Rhodes' staff at Penn State, where he became the first General Manager in Penn State Nittany Lions basketball team history.

== Head coaching record ==
=== College ===
Record table
Season	Team	Overall	Conference	Standing	Postseason
Rice Owls (Conference USA) (2017–2023)
2017–18	Rice	7–24	4–14	13th	
2018–19	Rice	13–19	8–10	T–11th	
2019–20	Rice	15–17	7–11	12th	
2020–21	Rice	15–13	6–10	6th (West)	
2021–22	Rice	16–17	7–11	5th (West)	CBI First Round
2022–23	Rice	19–16	8–12	T–6th	CBI Quarterfinals
Rice Owls (American Athletic Conference) (2023–2024)
2023–24	Rice	11–21	5–13	T–10th	
Rice:		96–127 (.430)	45–81 (.357)		
Total:		96–127 (.430)			
