= UTSA Roadrunners men's basketball statistical leaders =

The UTSA Roadrunners men's basketball statistical leaders are individual statistical leaders of the UTSA Roadrunners men's basketball program in various categories, including points, assists, blocks, rebounds, and steals. Within those areas, the lists identify single-game, single-season, and career leaders. The Roadrunners represent the University of Texas San Antonio in the NCAA Division I American Athletic Conference.

UTSA began competing in intercollegiate basketball in 1981. The NCAA did not officially record assists as a stat until the 1983–84 season, and blocks and steals until the 1985–86 season, but UTSA's record books includes players in these stats before these seasons. These lists are updated through the end of the 2020–21 season.

== Scoring ==
Career
Rk	Player	Points	Seasons
1	Jhivvan Jackson	2,551	2017–18 2018–19 2019–20 2020–21
2	Keaton Wallace	2,080	2017–18 2018–19 2019–20 2020–21
3	Devin Brown	1,922	1998–99 1999–00 2000–01 2001–02
4	Derrick Gervin	1,691	1981–82 1982–83 1983–84 1984–85
5	Devin Gibson	1,681	2007–08 2008–09 2009–10 2010–11
6	Jeromie Hill	1,674	2010–11 2011–12 2012–13 2014–15
7	Keith Horne	1,459	1988–89 1989–90 1990–91 1991–92
8	McEverett Powers	1,307	1998–99 1999–00 2000–01 2001–02
9	Jacob Germany	1,291	2019–20 2020–21 2021–22 2022–23
10	Ronnie Ellison	1,284	1989–90 1990–91 1991–92

Season
Rk	Player	Points	Season
1	Jhivvan Jackson	856	2019–20
2	Derrick Gervin	718	1984–85
3	Jhivvan Jackson	663	2018–19
4	Keaton Wallace	646	2018–19
5	Leroy Hurd	639	2003–04
6	Derrick Gervin	626	1983–84
7	Keaton Wallace	600	2019–20
8	Ronnie Ellison	597	1990–91
9	Primo Spears	593	2024–25
10	Marlon Anderson	581	1994–95

Single game
Rk	Player	Points	Season	Opponent
1	Roderic Hall	52	1997–98	Maine
2	Derrick Gervin	51	1984–85	Baylor
3	Jhivvan Jackson	46	2018–19	WKU
4	Keaton Wallace	45	2018–19	Marshall
	Jhivvan Jackson	45	2019–20	Old Dominion
6	Frank Hampton	42	1986–87	Hardin-Simmons
	Derrick Gervin	42	1983–84	West Texas A&M
8	Jhivvan Jackson	41	2019–20	Illinois State
9	Frank Hampton	40	1987–88	UALR
	Primo Spears	40	2024–25	Tulsa

== Rebounds ==
Career
Rk	Player	Rebounds	Seasons
1	Byron Frohnen	912	2016–17 2017–18 2018–19 2019–20
2	Jeromie Hill	842	2010–11 2011–12 2012–13 2014–15
3	Leon Watson	794	1996–97 1997–98 1998–99 1999–00
4	Jacob Germany	779	2019–20 2020–21 2021–22 2022–23
5	McEverett Powers	760	1998–99 1999–00 2000–01 2001–02
6	Devin Brown	751	1998–99 1999–00 2000–01 2001–02
7	Derrick Gervin	684	1981–82 1982–83 1983–84 1984–85
8	Bruce Wheatley	668	1987–88 1988–89 1989–90
9	Nick Allen	563	2015–16 2016–17 2017–18 2018–19
10	Keaton Wallace	554	2017–18 2018–19 2019–20 2020–21

Season
Rk	Player	Rebounds	Season
1	Bruce Wheatley	287	1989–90
2	Clarence McGee	272	1987–88
3	Derrick Gervin	268	1984–85
4	Leroy Hurd	264	2003–04
5	Leon Watson	263	1997–98
6	Byron Frohnen	253	2017–18
7	Jacob Germany	248	2022–23
8	Jeromie Hill	244	2014–15
9	Derrick Gervin	239	1983–84
10	Rodney Smith	237	1993–94
	Leon Watson	237	1999–00

Single game
Rk	Player	Rebounds	Season	Opponent
1	Lennell Moore	25	1986–87	Centenary
2	Clarence McGee	20	1987–88	Hardin-Simmons
	Jonnivius Smith	20	2024–25	Merrimack
4	Clarence McGee	19	1987–88	Hartford
	Bruce Wheatley	19	1989–90	UALR
	Leon Watson	19	1997–98	UTRGV
7	Derrick Gervin	18	1984–85	Baylor
	Derrick Gervin	18	1984–85	Sam Houston State
	Clarence McGee	18	1987–88	Schreiner
	Jacob Germany	18	2022–23	Florida International

== Assists ==
Career
Rk	Player	Assists	Seasons
1	Devin Gibson	549	2007–08 2008–09 2009–10 2010–11
2	Lloyd Williams	536	1996–97 1997–98 1998–99 1999–00
3	Thaddeus Wordlaw	388	1992–93 1993–94 1994–95 1995–96
4	Ronnie Ellison	380	1989–90 1990–91 1991–92
5	Kurt Attaway	371	2003–04 2004–05 2005–06 2006–07
6	Keaton Wallace	355	2017–18 2018–19 2019–20 2020–21
7	Giovanni De Nicolao	348	2016–17 2017–18 2018–19
8	David President	339	2001–02 2002–03 2003–04 2004–05
9	Jon Havens	294	1999–00 2000–01 2001–02 2002–03
10	Jhivvan Jackson	286	2017–18 2018–19 2019–20 2020–21

Season
Rk	Player	Assists	Season
1	Ronnie Ellison	186	1991–92
2	Devin Gibson	183	2010–11
3	Christian Tucker	173	2023–24
4	Lloyd Williams	159	1999–00
5	Devin Gibson	142	2007–08
6	Todd Barnes	140	1987–88
7	Devin Gibson	134	2009–10
8	Lloyd Williams	131	1998–99
9	Omar Johnson	130	2008–09
	Lloyd Williams	129	1996–97

Single game
Rk	Player	Assists	Season	Opponent
1	Issy Washington	14	1986–87	Jarvis Christian
	Christian Tucker	14	2023–24	Tulsa

== Steals ==
Career
Rk	Player	Steals	Seasons
1	Devin Gibson	323	2007–08 2008–09 2009–10 2010–11
2	Lloyd Williams	237	1996–97 1997–98 1998–99 1999–00
3	Devin Brown	184	1998–99 1999–00 2000–01 2001–02
4	Ronnie Ellison	183	1989–90 1990–91 1991–92
5	Keon Lewis	163	2013–14 2014–15
6	Kurt Attaway	162	2003–04 2004–05 2005–06 2006–07
7	Keith Horne	160	1988–89 1989–90 1990–91 1991–92
	Jeromie Hill	160	2010–11 2011–12 2012–13 2014–15
9	David President	155	2001–02 2002–03 2003–04 2004–05
10	Giovanni De Nicolao	153	2016–17 2017–18 2018–19

Season
Rk	Player	Steals	Season
1	Ronnie Ellison	97	1990–91
2	Devin Gibson	93	2007–08
3	Devin Gibson	91	2010–11
4	Devin Gibson	82	2008–09
5	Preston Ivory	73	1990–91
6	Lloyd Williams	68	1999–00
7	Ronnie Ellison	63	1991–92
8	Kurt Attaway	60	2006–07
9	Omar Johnson	58	2008–09
	Lloyd Williams	58	1998–99

Single game
Rk	Player	Steals	Season	Opponent
1	Taju Olajuwon	8	1990–91	Samford
	Kurt Attaway	8	2003–04	Southeastern Louisiana

== Blocks ==
Career
Rk	Player	Blocks	Seasons
1	Leon Watson	192	1996–97 1997–98 1998–99 1999–00
2	Tim Faulkner	112	1985–86 1986–87 1988–89 1989–90
3	McEverett Powers	105	1998–99 1999–00 2000–01 2001–02
	Jacob Germany	105	2019–20 2020–21 2021–22 2022–23
5	Anthony Fuqua	93	2003–04 2004–05
6	Tom Oswald	85	1992–93 1993–94 1994–95 1995–96
7	Jeromie Hill	69	2010–11 2011–12 2012–13 2014–15
8	Taju Olajuwon	66	1989–90 1990–91 1991–92
9	Derrick Gervin	65	1981–82 1982–83 1983–84 1984–85
10	Rick Doyle	60	1982–83 1983–84
	Grant Martin	60	1987–88 1988–89

Season
Rk	Player	Blocks	Season
1	Leon Watson	65	1997–98
2	Leon Watson	54	1998–99
3	Tim Faulkner	51	1989–90
	Anthony Fuqua	51	2004–05
5	Carlton Linguard Jr.	49	2023–24
6	Baboucarr Njie	46	2025–26
7	Jonnivius Smith	45	2024–25
8	Anthony Fuqua	42	2003–04
9	Leon Watson	41	1999–00
10	Grant Martin	39	1988–89

Single game
Rk	Player	Blocks	Season	Opponent
1	Baboucarr Njie	7	2025–26	North Texas
2	Tom Oswald	6	1995–96	UL-Monroe
