= 2018–19 Marshall Thundering Herd men's basketball team =

American college basketball season

2018–19 Marshall Thundering Herd men's basketball

Jim Phelan Classic champions

CIT, Champions
- Conference: Conference USA
- Record: 23–14 (11–7 C-USA)
- Head coach: Dan D'Antoni (5th season)
- Assistant coaches: Mark Cline; Scott Rigot; Cornelius Jackson
- Home arena: Cam Henderson Center

2018–19 Conference USA men's basketball standings
	Conf.				Overall
Team	W		L	PCT	W		L	PCT
Old Dominion †	13	–	5	.722	26	–	9	.743
Western Kentucky	11	–	7	.611	20	–	14	.588
Southern Miss	11	–	7	.611	20	–	13	.606
UTSA	11	–	7	.611	17	–	15	.531
UAB	10	–	8	.556	20	–	15	.571
Marshall	11	–	7	.611	23	–	14	.622
FIU	10	–	8	.556	20	–	13	.606
Louisiana Tech	9	–	9	.500	20	–	13	.606
Florida Atlantic	8	–	10	.444	17	–	16	.515
North Texas	8	–	10	.444	21	–	12	.636
Rice	8	–	10	.444	13	–	19	.406
Middle Tennessee	8	–	10	.444	11	–	21	.344
Charlotte	5	–	13	.278	8	–	21	.276
UTEP	3	–	15	.167	8	–	21	.276
† 2019 C-USA tournament winner

The 2018–19 Marshall Thundering Herd men's basketball team represented Marshall University during the 2018–19 NCAA Division I men's basketball season. The Thundering Herd, led by fifth-year head coach Dan D'Antoni, played their home games at the Cam Henderson Center as members of Conference USA. They finished the season 23–14, 11–7 in C-USA play to finish in sixth place. They defeated Rice before losing to Southern Miss in the quarterfinals of the C-USA tournament. They were invited to the CollegeInsider.com Tournament where they defeated IUPUI, Presbyterian, Hampton and Green Bay to become CIT champions.

== Previous season ==
The Thundering Herd finished the 2017–18 season 25–11, 12–6 in C-USA play to finish in fourth place. They defeated UTSA, Southern Miss, and Western Kentucky to become champions of the C-USA tournament. They received C-USA's automatic bid to the NCAA tournament where, as a No. 13 seed, they upset No. 4 seed Wichita State 81–75 in the first round before losing to No. 5 seed and rival West Virginia in the second round.

== Offseason ==
=== Departures ===
Name	Number	Pos.	Height	Weight	Year	Hometown	Notes
Phil Bledsoe	32	G/F	6'6"	220	Sophomore	Wheeling, West Virginia	Transferred to Glenville State
Ot Elmore	12	G	6'2"	197	RS Senior	Charleston, West Virginia	Graduated
Will Fenton	24	G	6'6"	205	Freshman	Fayetteville, West Virginia	Walk-on; did not return
Dani Koljanin	1	F	6'8"	220	Junior	Pula, Croatia	Transferred to Little Rock
Milan Mijović	50	F	6'9"	255	Senior	Belgrade, Serbia	Graduated
Ajdin Penava	11	F	6'9"	220	Junior	Sarajevo, Bosnia and Herzegovina	Declared for 2018 NBA draft
Marcus Reed	5	G	6'0"	175	Senior	Charleston, West Virginia	Graduated
Christian Villers	4	G	6'3"	180	Freshman	Ashland, Kentucky	Walk-on; did not return

=== Incoming transfers ===
Name	Number	Pos.	Height	Weight	Year	Hometown	Previous school
Ante Šustić	12	F	6'10"	230	Junior	Split, Croatia	Junior college transferred from Highland Community College
Mikel Beyers	31	F	6'8"	215	Sophomore	Houston, Texas	Junior college transferred from Mesa Community College

=== 2018 recruiting class ===
College recruiting
Name	Hometown	School	Height	Weight	Commit date
Jeremy Dillon; SG	Matewan, West Virginia	Mingo Central High School	6 ft 5 in (1.96 m)	198 lb (90 kg)	Sep 14, 2016
Jeremy Dillon; SG	Recruit ratings: Scout: Rivals: (NR)				
Cameron Brooks-Harris; SF	Zanesville, Ohio	Zanesville High School	6 ft 7 in (2.01 m)	180 lb (82 kg)	Oct 13, 2017
Cameron Brooks-Harris; SF	Recruit ratings: Scout: Rivals: (NR)				
Taevion Kinsey; SG	Columbus, Ohio	Eastmoor Academy	6 ft 4 in (1.93 m)	160 lb (73 kg)	Apr 18, 2018
Taevion Kinsey; SG	Recruit ratings: Scout: Rivals: (NR)				
Overall recruit ranking: Scout: NR Rivals: NR ESPN: NR
Note: In many cases, Scout, Rivals, 247Sports, On3, and ESPN may conflict in their listings of height and weight.; In these cases, the average was taken. ESPN grades are on a 100-point scale.; Sources: "Marshall Basketball Commitment List". Rivals.; "2018 Marshall Basketball Commits". Scout.; "ESPN". ESPN.; "Scout.com Team Recruiting Rankings". Scout.; "2018 Team Ranking". Rivals.

== Roster ==
2018–19 Marshall Thundering Herd men's basketball team
Players
Coaches

Pos.	#	Name	Height	Weight	Year	Previous school	Hometown
F	0	Christian Thieneman	6 ft 5 in (1.96 m)	215 lb (98 kg)	RS Jr	Trinity	Louisville, Kentucky
G	1	Taevion Kinsey	6 ft 5 in (1.96 m)	177 lb (80 kg)	Fr	Eastmoor	Columbus, Ohio
F	2	Iran Bennett	6 ft 9 in (2.06 m)	350 lb (159 kg)	RS Fr	Hargrave	Durham, North Carolina
F	3	Jannson Williams	6 ft 9 in (2.06 m)	215 lb (98 kg)	RS So	Newnan	Newnan, Georgia
G	4	DeAundra Murphy (W)	6 ft 3 in (1.91 m)	169 lb (77 kg)	Fr	St. Joe	Huntington, West Virginia
G/F	5	Jeremy Dillon (redshirt)	6 ft 5 in (1.96 m)	198 lb (90 kg)	Fr	Mingo Central	Mingo, West Virginia
G	11	Luke Thomas (W)	6 ft 0 in (1.83 m)	176 lb (80 kg)	Fr	Fairland	Proctorville, Ohio
F	12	Ante Šustić	6 ft 10 in (2.08 m)	230 lb (104 kg)	Jr	Highland CC	Split, Croatia
G	13	Jarrod West	5 ft 11 in (1.8 m)	185 lb (84 kg)	So	Notre Dame HS	Clarksburg, West Virginia
G	14	C.J. Burks	6 ft 4 in (1.93 m)	185 lb (84 kg)	RS Sr	Hedgesville	Martinsburg, West Virginia
F	21	Darius George	6 ft 7 in (2.01 m)	215 lb (98 kg)	So	Robert E. Lee	Staunton, Virginia
G	23	Rondale Watson	6 ft 4 in (1.93 m)	187 lb (85 kg)	RS Sr	Wake Forest	Lewisburg, West Virginia
F	24	Cam Brooks-Harris (redshirt)	6 ft 6 in (1.98 m)	170 lb (77 kg)	Fr	Zanesville	Zanesville, Ohio
G	25	Wilhelm von Arndt (W)	6 ft 0 in (1.83 m)	175 lb (79 kg)	Fr		Stockholm, Sweden
F	31	Mikel Beyers	6 ft 8 in (2.03 m)	215 lb (98 kg)	So	Mesa CC	Houston, Texas
G	33	Jon Elmore	6 ft 3 in (1.91 m)	187 lb (85 kg)	Sr	VMI	Charleston, West Virginia

Head coach

- Dan D'Antoni (Marshall)

Assistant coach(es)

- Mark Cline (Wake Forest)
- Scott Rigot (Buffalo)
- Cornelius Jackson (Marshall)

Legend

- (C) Team captain
- (S) Suspended
- (I) Ineligible
- (W) Walk-on
- Injured
- Current redshirt

Roster
Last update: 09/27/2018

== Schedule and results ==
Date time, TV	Rank^{#}	Opponent^{#}	Result	Record	High points	High rebounds	High assists	Site (attendance) city, state
Exhibition
Oct 28, 2018*; 4:00 pm		Glenville State	W 113–108		25 – Burks	8 – Elmore	9 – Elmore	Cam Henderson Center (5,734); Huntington, WV
Nov 1, 2018*; 7:00 pm		West Virginia Wesleyan	W 83–65		10 – Tied	7 – Brooks-Harris	7 – Elmore	Cam Henderson Center (5,721); Huntington, WV
Non-conference regular season
Nov 7, 2018*; 7:00 pm, ESPN+		at Eastern Kentucky	W 105–77	1–0	30 – Burks	10 – Watson	6 – Elmore	McBrayer Arena (5,189); Richmond, KY
Nov 11, 2018*; 2:30 pm, ESPN+		Hofstra	W 76–72	2–0	30 – Elmore	8 – Elmore	6 – Burks	Cam Henderson Center (7,854); Huntington, WV
Nov 14, 2018*; 7:00 pm, ESPN+		Mount St. Mary's	W 98–75	3–0	24 – Elmore	8 – Watson	10 – Watson	Cam Henderson Center (6,050); Huntington, WV
Nov 19, 2018*; 7:00 pm, ESPN+		North Carolina A&T	W 95–71	4–0	18 – Elmore	7 – Watson	5 – Tied	Cam Henderson Center (6,162); Huntington, WV
Nov 23, 2018*; 6:00 pm, BTN		at Maryland	L 67–104	4–1	21 – Williams	5 – Williams	3 – Tied	Xfinity Center (11,711); College Park, MD
Nov 28, 2018*; 7:00 pm, WVAH 11.2		William & Mary	W 84–64	5–1	26 – Elmore	7 – Watson	5 – Elmore	Cam Henderson Center (6,187); Huntington, WV
Dec 1, 2018*; 3:30 pm, ESPN+		at Ohio	L 84–101	5–2	26 – Elmore	4 – 5 Tied	5 – Elmore	Convocation Center (6,301); Athens, OH
Dec 5, 2018*; 7:00 pm, ATTSNP		at Duquesne	L 82–93	5–3	26 – Burks	7 – George	5 – Burks	Palumbo Center (1,689); Pittsburgh, PA
Dec 8, 2018*; 2:30 pm, WVAH 11.2		Toledo	L 74–75 ^{OT}	5–4	21 – Elmore	10 – Watson	5 – Elmore	Cam Henderson Center (6,232); Huntington, WV
Dec 10, 2018*; 7:00 pm, ESPN+		Morehead State	W 76–64	6–4	27 – Elmore	8 – Williams	4 – 3 Tied	Cam Henderson Center (6,253); Huntington, WV
Dec 15, 2018*; 2:00 pm, ESPN+		at Akron	W 75–74	7–4	19 – Elmore	8 – Elmore	6 – Elmore	James A. Rhodes Arena (2,748); Akron, OH
Dec 22, 2018*; 2:00 pm, SECN+		at Texas A&M	L 68–92	7–5	19 – Watson	8 – Williams	4 – Elmore	Reed Arena (7,894); College Station, TX
Dec 31, 2018*; 1:00 pm, ACCRSN		at No. 4 Virginia	L 64–100	7–6	14 – Elmore	5 – Beyers	3 – Elmore	John Paul Jones Arena (14,623); Charlottesville, VA
Conference USA regular season
Jan 3, 2019; 7:00 pm, Stadium		at Old Dominion	W 70–67	8–6 (1–0)	20 – Elmore	7 – Kinsey	10 – Elmore	Ted Constant Convocation Center (6,153); Norfolk, VA
Jan 5, 2019; 4:00 pm, ESPN+		at Charlotte	W 85–84	9–6 (2–0)	25 – Burks	6 – Williams	5 – Elmore	Dale F. Halton Arena (4,014); Charlotte, NC
Jan 12, 2019; 7:00 pm, Facebook		Western Kentucky	W 70–69	10–6 (3–0)	23 – Kinsey	7 – Kinsey	5 – Elmore	Cam Henderson Center (7,687); Huntington, WV
Jan 17, 2019; 7:00 pm, ESPN+		Florida Atlantic	W 96–84	11–6 (4–0)	30 – Burks	6 – Kinsey	7 – Elmore	Cam Henderson Center (6,196); Huntington, WV
Jan 19, 2019; 7:00 pm, ESPN+		FIU	W 105–97	12–6 (5–0)	30 – Burks	9 – Kinsey	6 – Elmore	Cam Henderson Center (7,330); Huntington, WV
Jan 21, 2019; 9:00 pm, CBSSN		at Western Kentucky	L 59–68	12–7 (5–1)	17 – Elmore	8 – Burks	4 – Kinsey	E. A. Diddle Arena (6,369); Bowling Green, KY
Jan 24, 2019; 9:00 pm, CBSSN		at Louisiana Tech	L 80–89 ^{OT}	12–8 (5–2)	29 – Burks	12 – Burks	8 – Elmore	Thomas Assembly Center (3,745); Ruston, LA
Jan 26, 2019; 5:00 pm, Stadium		at Southern Miss	L 51–101	12–9 (5–3)	11 – Tied	4 – Tied	2 – Elmore	Reed Green Coliseum (3,316); Hattiesburg, MS
Jan 31, 2019; 7:30 pm, beIN		UTEP	W 91–86	13–9 (6–3)	44 – Elmore	7 – Elmore	5 – Burks	Cam Henderson Center (5,765); Huntington, WV
Feb 2, 2019; 7:00 pm, Facebook		UTSA	L 106–116 ^{OT}	13–10 (6–4)	31 – Burks	7 – West	8 – Elmore	Cam Henderson Center (7,182); Huntington, WV
Feb 7, 2019; 8:00 pm, beIN		at North Texas	L 51–78	13–11 (6–5)	18 – Kinsey	6 – Williams	2 – Burks	The Super Pit (3,484); Denton, TX
Feb 9, 2019; 8:00 pm, ESPN+		at Rice	L 69–74	13–12 (6–6)	24 – Burks	12 – Williams	7 – Elmore	Tudor Fieldhouse (2,910); Houston, TX
Feb 14, 2019; 8:00 pm, CBSSN		UAB	L 68–77	13–13 (6–7)	20 – Elmore	8 – Elmore	5 – Elmore	Cam Henderson Center (5,521); Huntington, WV
Feb 16, 2019; 2:00 pm, Facebook		Middle Tennessee	W 98–93	14–13 (7–7)	20 – Burks	7 – George	3 – Burks	Cam Henderson Center (6,927); Huntington, WV
Feb 28, 2019; 7:30 pm, CUSA-TV		at Louisiana Tech	W 90–79	15–13 (8–7)	34 – Elmore	10 – Williams	7 – Elmore	Thomas Assembly Center (3,217); Ruston, LA
Mar 3, 2019; 4:00 pm, Stadium		at North Texas	W 85–82	16–13 (9–7)	21 – Burks	6 – Elmore	4 – Burks	The Super Pit (3,108); Denton, TX
Mar 6, 2019; 7:00 pm, ESPN+		FIU	W 94–78	17–13 (10–7)	21 – Burks	8 – 3 Tied	7 – Burks	Cam Henderson Center (5,822); Huntington, WV
Mar 9, 2019; 12:00 pm, Stadium		Florida Atlantic	W 76–61	18–13 (11–7)	17 – West	10 – Elmore	4 – Elmore	Cam Henderson Center (7,097); Huntington, WV
Conference USA tournament
Mar 13, 2019; 10:00 pm, ESPN+	(6)	vs. (11) Rice; First round	W 82–65	19–13	32 – Elmore	6 – Elmore	6 – Elmore	Ford Center at The Star (2,704); Frisco, TX
Mar 14, 2019; 10:00 pm, Facebook	(6)	vs. (3) Southern Miss; Quarterfinals	L 73–82	19–14	22 – Williams	8 – Elmore	11 – Elmore	Ford Center at The Star (4,024); Frisco, TX
CollegeInsider.com Postseason tournament
Mar 19, 2019*; 7:00 pm		IUPUI; First round – Jim Phelan Classic	W 78–73	20–14	25 – Burks	10 – Elmore	7 – Elmore	Cam Henderson Center (3,725); Huntington, WV
Mar 26, 2019*; 7:00 pm		Presbyterian; Quarterfinals	W 83–66	21–14	20 – Burks	7 – Tied	8 – Burks	Cam Henderson Center (3,383); Huntington, WV
Apr 2, 2019*; 7:00 pm		Hampton; Semifinals	W 80–78	22–14	28 – Elmore	9 – Tied	5 – Elmore	Cam Henderson Center (4,122); Huntington, WV
Apr 4, 2019*; 7:00 pm, CBSSN		Green Bay; Championship	W 90–70	23–14	28 – Burks	11 – Kinsey	6 – Burks	Cam Henderson Center (5,748); Huntington, WV
*Non-conference game. ^{#}Rankings from AP Poll. (#) Tournament seedings in parentheses. All times are in Eastern Time.
