= 2018–19 Florida Atlantic Owls men's basketball team =

American college basketball season

2018–19 Florida Atlantic Owls men's basketball

CIT, First round
- Conference: Conference USA
- Record: 17–16 (8–10 C-USA)
- Head coach: Dusty May (1st season)
- Assistant coaches: Erik Pastrana; Akeem Miskdeen; Kyle Church
- Home arena: FAU Arena

2018–19 Conference USA men's basketball standings
	Conf.				Overall
Team	W		L	PCT	W		L	PCT
Old Dominion †	13	–	5	.722	26	–	9	.743
Western Kentucky	11	–	7	.611	20	–	14	.588
Southern Miss	11	–	7	.611	20	–	13	.606
UTSA	11	–	7	.611	17	–	15	.531
UAB	10	–	8	.556	20	–	15	.571
Marshall	11	–	7	.611	23	–	14	.622
FIU	10	–	8	.556	20	–	13	.606
Louisiana Tech	9	–	9	.500	20	–	13	.606
Florida Atlantic	8	–	10	.444	17	–	16	.515
North Texas	8	–	10	.444	21	–	12	.636
Rice	8	–	10	.444	13	–	19	.406
Middle Tennessee	8	–	10	.444	11	–	21	.344
Charlotte	5	–	13	.278	8	–	21	.276
UTEP	3	–	15	.167	8	–	21	.276
† 2019 C-USA tournament winner

The 2018–19 Florida Atlantic Owls men's basketball team represented Florida Atlantic University during the 2018–19 NCAA Division I men's basketball season. The Owls, led by first-year head coach Dusty May, played their home games at the FAU Arena in Boca Raton, Florida as members of Conference USA.

== Previous season ==
The Owls finished the 2017–18 season 12–19, 6–12 in C-USA play to finish in a tie for 11th place. They lost in the first round of the C-USA tournament to UAB.

March 16, 2018, head coach Michael Curry was fired after four seasons at Florida Atlantic. On March 22, it was announced that the school had hired Florida assistant head coach Dusty May as head coach.

== Offseason ==
=== Departures ===
Name	Number	Pos.	Height	Weight	Year	Hometown	Reason for departure
Payton Hulsey	0	G	6'5"	215	RS Senior	Memphis, TN	Graduated
Je'Quan Perry	1	G	6'4"	220	Junior	Charleston, SC	Graduate transferred to Francis Marion
Jason Massey	2	G	6'4"	190	RS Senior	Cooper City, FL	Graduated
Byron Abrams	4	G	6'3"	185	Freshman	Decatur, GA	Transferred to Gordon State College
William Pfister	5	F	6'10"	230	Senior	Strasbourg, France	Graduated
Devorious Brown	10	G	6'2"	195	Sophomore	Madison, GA	Transferred to Auburn Montgomery
Tre' Maloney	11	F	6'7"	208	RS Sophomore	Fort Lauderdale, FL	Walk-on; dismissed from the team
Gerdarius Troutman	14	G	6'3"	175	Senior	Butler, GA	Graduated
Kevin Rostamian	30	C	6'8"	270	Sophomore	Weston, FL	Walk-on; transferred
Amir Smith	32	F	6'6"	210	Junior	Houston, TX	Transferred
Ronald Delph	33	C	7'0"	245	RS Senior	Winter Haven, FL	Graduated
Chisom Obidike	35	C	6'10"	214	Freshman	Uwani, Nigeria	Transferred to Paris Junior College

=== Incoming transfers ===
Name	Number	Pos.	Height	Weight	Year	Hometown	Previous School
Everett Winchester	2	G/F	6'6"	195	Junior	Baltimore, MD	Transferred from Wright State. Under NCAA transfer rules, Winchester will have to sit out for the 2018–19 season. Will have two years of remaining eligibility.
Xavian Stapleton	4	G	6'6"	210	RS Senior	Flora, MS	Transferred from Mississippi State. Will be eligible to play immediately since Stapleton graduated from Mississippi State.
Aleksandar Zecevic	12	F	6'10"		Junior	Novi Sad, Serbia	Junior college transferred from San Jacinto College
Richardson Maitre	23	G	6'3"	173	Junior	Montreal, QE	Junior college transferred from Indian Hills Community College
Cedric Jackson	24	G	6'3"		Junior	Orlando, FL	Junior college transferred from Indian River State College
Karlis Silins	25	C	6'11"	245	Junior	Riga, Latvia	Transferred from Ole Miss.

=== 2018 recruiting class ===
College recruiting information
Name	Hometown	School	Height	Weight	Commit date
Michael Forrest; PG	Blanche Ely High School	Pompano Beach, FL	6 ft 1 in (1.85 m)	165 lb (75 kg)	Apr 19, 2018
Michael Forrest; PG	Recruit ratings: Scout: Rivals: (NR)				
Kevaughn Ellis; PG	Hamilton Heights Christian Academy	Hamilton, ON	6 ft 4 in (1.93 m)	185 lb (84 kg)	Apr 17, 2018
Kevaughn Ellis; PG	Recruit ratings: Scout: Rivals: (NR)				
Jaylen Sebree; SF	IMG Academy	Hopkinsville, KY	6 ft 6 in (1.98 m)	175 lb (79 kg)	Apr 18, 2018
Jaylen Sebree; SF	Recruit ratings: Scout: Rivals: (NR)				
Madiaw Niang; SF	DME Sports Academy	Dakar, Senegal	6 ft 9 in (2.06 m)	200 lb (91 kg)	Apr 4, 2018
Madiaw Niang; SF	Recruit ratings: Scout: Rivals: (NR)				
Overall recruit ranking:
Note: In many cases, Scout, Rivals, 247Sports, On3, and ESPN may conflict in their listings of height and weight.; In these cases, the average was taken. ESPN grades are on a 100-point scale.; Sources: "2018 Team Ranking". Rivals.

=== 2019 recruiting class ===
College recruiting information (2019)
Name	Hometown	School	Height	Weight	Commit date
Carrington McCaskill #48 PF	Renaissance High School	Detroit, MI	6 ft 1 in (1.85 m)	165 lb (75 kg)	Sep 19, 2018
Carrington McCaskill #48 PF	Recruit ratings: Scout: Rivals: (75)				
Overall recruit ranking:
Note: In many cases, Scout, Rivals, 247Sports, On3, and ESPN may conflict in their listings of height and weight.; In these cases, the average was taken. ESPN grades are on a 100-point scale.; Sources: "2019 Team Ranking". Rivals.

== Roster ==
2018–19 Florida Atlantic Owls men's basketball team
Players
Coaches

Pos.	#	Name	Height	Weight	Year	Previous school	Hometown
F	0	Jaylen Sebree	6 ft 7 in (2.01 m)	190 lb (86 kg)	Fr	Christian County	Hopkinsville, KY
F	1	Madiaw Niang	6 ft 9 in (2.06 m)	210 lb (95 kg)	Fr	DME Sports Academy	Dakar, Senegal
G	2	Everett Winchester (redshirt)	6 ft 6 in (1.98 m)	205 lb (93 kg)	Jr	Gilman School; Wright State	Baltimore, MD
G	3	Anthony Adger	6 ft 1 in (1.85 m)	170 lb (77 kg)	RS Fr	Crescent; Spartanburg Methodist	Anderson, SC
F	4	Xavian Stapleton	6 ft 7 in (2.01 m)	203 lb (92 kg)	RS Sr	Madison Central; Mississippi State	Flora, MS
G	5	Gabe Merete (W)	6 ft 7 in (2.01 m)	185 lb (84 kg)	Fr	Bishop Kenny	Jacksonville, FL
G	10	Kevaughn Ellis	6 ft 4 in (1.93 m)	180 lb (82 kg)	Fr	Hamilton Heights Christian Academy	Hamilton, ON
G	11	Michael Forrest	6 ft 0 in (1.83 m)	170 lb (77 kg)	Fr	Blanche Ely	Lauderhill, FL
F/C	12	Aleksandar Zecevic	6 ft 10 in (2.08 m)	245 lb (111 kg)	Jr	Scotland Performance Institute; San Jacinto College	Novi Sad, Serbia
G	14	Eric Angleró (W)	5 ft 11 in (1.8 m)	175 lb (79 kg)	Fr	Montverde Academy	Río Piedras, PR
F	15	Jailyn Ingram	6 ft 7 in (2.01 m)	215 lb (98 kg)	Jr	Morgan County	Madison, GA
F/C	21	Simeon Lepichev	6 ft 9 in (2.06 m)	226 lb (103 kg)	Sr	Kankakee CC	Sofia, Bulgaria
G	23	Richardson Maitre	6 ft 3 in (1.91 m)	180 lb (82 kg)	So	West Oaks Academy; Indian Hills CC	Montreal, QC
G	24	Cedric Jackson	6 ft 3 in (1.91 m)	180 lb (82 kg)	Jr	Jones; Indian River State College	Orlando, FL
F/C	25	Karlis Silins (redshirt)	6 ft 11 in (2.11 m)	240 lb (109 kg)	Jr	BK VEF Rīga; Ole Miss	Riga, Latvia

Head coach

- Dusty May (Indiana)

Assistant coach(es)

- Erik Pastrana (Florida State)
- Akeem Miskdeen (Queens (NC))
- Kyle Church (Charlotte)

Legend

- (C) Team captain
- (S) Suspended
- (I) Ineligible
- (W) Walk-on
- Injured
- Current redshirt

Roster

== Schedule and results ==
Date time, TV	Rank^{#}	Opponent^{#}	Result	Record	Site (attendance) city, state
Exhibition
Oct 27, 2018*; 4:00 pm		Lynn	L 87–92		FAU Arena; Boca Raton, FL
Non-conference regular season
Nov 7, 2018*; 7:00 pm		Florida Tech	W 98–52	1–0	FAU Arena (1,098); Boca Raton, FL
Nov 11, 2018*; 3:00 pm		at UCF	W 80–79	2–0	CFE Arena (4,304); Orlando, FL
Nov 16, 2018*; 5:00 pm		vs. Georgia Southern; The Islands of the Bahamas Showcase Quarterfinals	L 70–80	2–1	Kendal Isaacs National Gymnasium (247); Nassau, Bahamas
Nov 17, 2018*; 2:00 pm		vs. Towson; The Islands of the Bahamas Showcase consolation semifinals	W 85–71	3–1	Kendal Isaacs National Gymnasium; Nassau, Bahamas
Nov 18, 2018*; 2:00pm		vs. Incarnate Word; The Islands of the Bahamas Showcase consolation finals	W 71–68	4–1	Kendal Isaacs National Gymnasium (263); Nassau, Bahamas
Nov 21, 2018*; 7:00 pm		Palm Beach Atlantic; The Islands of the Bahamas Showcase campus site game	W 73–62	5–1	FAU Arena (841); Boca Raton, FL
Nov 25, 2018*; 3:00 pm		Florida Gulf Coast	W 85–68	6–1	FAU Arena (1,013); Boca Raton, FL
Dec 1, 2018*; 4:00 pm		at Bethune–Cookman	L 70–72	6–2	Moore Gymnasium (891); Daytona Beach, FL
Dec 5, 2018*; 7:00 pm		Mercer	W 68–64	7–2	FAU Arena (1,492); Boca Raton, FL
Dec 14, 2018*; 8:30 pm		at Arkansas State	L 71–75 ^{2OT}	7–3	First National Bank Arena (1,116); Jonesboro, AR
Dec 19, 2018*; 5:30 pm		Florida College	W 76–64	8–3	FAU Arena (645); Boca Raton, FL
Dec 22, 2018*; 2:00 pm, ACCN Extra		at Miami (FL)	L 55–75	8–4	Watsco Center (6,222); Coral Gables, FL
Dec 29, 2018*; 3:00 pm, BTN Plus		at Illinois	W 73–71 ^{OT}	9–4	State Farm Center (15,554); Champaign, IL
Conference USA regular season
Jan 3, 2019; 8:00 pm, ESPN+		at UAB	L 50–67	9–5 (0–1)	Bartow Arena (2,667); Birmingham, AL
Jan 5, 2019; 6:00 pm, ESPN+		at Middle Tennessee	W 63–56	10–5 (1–1)	Murphy Center (3,422); Murfreesboro, TN
Jan 10, 2019; 7:00 pm, ESPN+		Old Dominion	W 80–73	11–5 (2–1)	FAU Arena (1,578); Boca Raton, FL
Jan 12, 2019; 4:00 pm		Charlotte	L 60–65	11–6 (2–2)	FAU Arena (1,239); Boca Raton, FL
Jan 17, 2019; 7:00 pm, ESPN+		at Marshall	L 84–96	11–7 (2–3)	Cam Henderson Center (6,196); Huntington, WV
Jan 19, 2019; 3:00 pm, Facebook		at Western Kentucky	L 66–72	11–8 (2–4)	E. A. Diddle Arena (4,963); Bowling Green, KY
Jan 23, 2019; 7:00 pm		FIU	L 74–78	11–9 (2–5)	FAU Arena (2,087); Boca Raton, FL
Jan 26, 2019; 7:00 pm		at FIU	W 89–72	12–9 (3–5)	Ocean Bank Convocation Center (4,710); Miami, FL
Jan 31, 2019; 7:00 pm		Louisiana Tech	W 69–61	13–9 (4–5)	FAU Arena (921); Boca Raton, FL
Feb 2, 2019; 4:00 pm		Southern Miss	L 72–74	13–10 (4–6)	FAU Arena (1,510); Boca Raton, FL
Feb 7, 2019; 9:00 pm		at UTEP	W 61–48	14–10 (5–6)	Don Haskins Center (4,646); El Paso, TX
Feb 9, 2019; 4:00 pm		at UTSA	L 74–86	14–11 (5–7)	Convocation Center (2,111); San Antonio, TX
Feb 14, 2019; 7:00 pm, ESPN+		North Texas	W 57–47	15–11 (6–7)	FAU Arena (853); Boca Raton, FL
Feb 16, 2019; 2:00 pm		Rice	W 60–41	16–11 (7–7)	FAU Arena (1,389); Boca Raton, FL
Feb 23, 2019; 4:00 pm		FIU	L 76–79	16–12 (7–8)	FAU Arena (1,147); Boca Raton, FL
Feb 28, 2019; 8:00 pm		at North Texas	W 60–54	17–12 (8–8)	UNT Coliseum (3,044); Denton, TX
Mar 6, 2019; 7:00 pm		Louisiana Tech	L 69–72	17–13 (8–9)	FAU Arena (842); Boca Raton, FL
Mar 9, 2019; 12:00 pm, Stadium		at Marshall	L 61–76	17–14 (8–10)	Cam Henderson Center (7,097); Huntington, WV
Conference USA tournament
Mar 13, 2019	(9)	vs. (8) Louisiana Tech; First round	L 56–57	17–15	Ford Center at The Star; Frisco, TX
CollegeInsider.com Postseason tournament
Mar 21, 2019*; 7:00 pm		at Charleston Southern; First round	L 66–68	17–16	CSU Field House (696); North Charleston, SC
*Non-conference game. ^{#}Rankings from AP Poll. (#) Tournament seedings in parentheses. All times are in Eastern Time.
