= Tim Carter (basketball) =

American basketball coach

Biographical details
- Born: June 13, 1956 (age 70); Wichita, Kansas, U.S.

Coaching career (HC unless noted)
- 1982–1983: Oklahoma (asst.)
- 1984–1986: Midwestern State (asst.)
- 1986–1987: Houston (asst.)
- 1987–1990: Oklahoma State (asst.)
- 1990–1994: Northwestern (asst.)
- 1994–1995: Nebraska–Omaha
- 1995–2006: UTSA
- 2006–2007: Florida State (asst.)
- 2007–2013: South Carolina State

Head coaching record
- Overall: 238–281 (.459)
- Tournaments: 0–2 (NCAA Division I)

Accomplishments and honors

Championships
- 2 Southland tournament (1999, 2004); Southland regular season (2004)

Awards
- Southland Coach of the Year (1999)

Tim Carter (born June 13, 1956) is the former head men's basketball coach at South Carolina State University. He was previously the head coach at the University of Texas at San Antonio, where he is the all-time winningest coach in the university's history. Carter became the head coach at South Carolina State in 2007, and finished 13-20 in his debut season. He then posted back-to-back winning seasons, and the 2009-10 season reached the MEAC final. In February 2013, Carter abruptly resigned, as his team was mired in a 26-game conference losing streak. Tim Carter was inducted into the Wichita North High School Hall of Fame in 2017. Reference, Wichita North High School.

== College ==
Record table
Season	Team	Overall	Conference	Standing	Postseason
Nebraska–Omaha Mavericks (North Central Conference) (1994–1995)
1994–95	Nebraska–Omaha	11–16	5–13	10th	
Nebraska–Omaha:		11–16 (.407)	5–13 (.278)		
UTSA Roadrunners (Southland Conference) (1995–2006)
1995–96	UTSA	14–14	12–6	2nd	
1996–97	UTSA	9–17	4–12	9th	
1997–98	UTSA	16–11	10–6	2nd	
1998–99	UTSA	18–11	12–6	2nd	NCAA Division I First Round
1999–2000	UTSA	15–13	12–6	3rd	
2000–01	UTSA	14–15	12–8	2nd	
2001–02	UTSA	19–10	13–7	3rd	
2002–03	UTSA	10–17	7–13	9th	
2003–04	UTSA	19–14	11–5	1st	NCAA Division I First Round
2004–05	UTSA	15–13	10–6	4th	
2005–06	UTSA	11–17	6–10	8th	
UTSA:		131–152 (.463)	109–85 (.562)		
South Carolina State Bulldogs (Mid-Eastern Athletic Conference) (2007–2013)
2007–08	South Carolina State	13–20	7–9	8th	
2008–09	South Carolina State	17–14	10–6	2nd	
2009–10	South Carolina State	16–13	10–6	3rd	
2010–11	South Carolina State	10–22	5–11	9th	
2011–12	South Carolina State	5–26	0–16	13th	
2012–13	South Carolina State	4–17	0–8		
South Carolina State:		65–112 (.367)	32–50 (.390)		
Total:		238–281 (.459)			
National champion Postseason invitational champion Conference regular season champion Conference regular season and conference tournament champion Division regular season champion Division regular season and conference tournament champion Conference tournament champion
