= 2010–11 UTSA Roadrunners men's basketball team =

American college basketball season

2010–11 UTSA Roadrunners men's basketball

Southland tournament champion

NCAA tournament, Round of 64
- Conference: Southland Conference
- West
- Record: 20–14 (9–7 Southland)
- Head coach: Brooks Thompson (5th season)
- Assistant coaches: Dan O'Dowd; Robert Guster; Jeff Renegar
- Home arena: Convocation Center

2010–11 Southland Conference men's basketball standings
| | Conf. | | | | Overall |
| Team | W | | L | PCT | W | | L | PCT |
|---|---|---|---|---|---|---|---|---|
East
| McNeese State | 11 | – | 5 | .688 | 21 | – | 12 | .636 |
| Northwestern State | 10 | – | 6 | .625 | 18 | – | 14 | .563 |
| Southeastern Louisiana | 9 | – | 7 | .563 | 15 | – | 14 | .517 |
| Nicholls State | 8 | – | 8 | .500 | 14 | – | 14 | .500 |
| Lamar | 7 | – | 9 | .438 | 13 | – | 17 | .433 |
| Central Arkansas | 1 | – | 15 | .063 | 5 | – | 24 | .172 |
West
| Sam Houston State | 10 | – | 6 | .625 | 18 | – | 13 | .581 |
| Texas State | 10 | – | 6 | .625 | 16 | – | 16 | .500 |
| Stephen F. Austin | 9 | – | 7 | .563 | 18 | – | 11 | .621 |
| UTSA † | 9 | – | 7 | .563 | 20 | – | 14 | .588 |
| Texas–Arlington | 7 | – | 9 | .438 | 13 | – | 16 | .448 |
| Texas A&M–Corpus Christi | 5 | – | 11 | .313 | 10 | – | 21 | .323 |
† 2011 Southland tournament winner As of March 14, 2011; Rankings from AP poll

The 2010–11 UTSA Roadrunners men's basketball team represented the University of Texas at San Antonio in the 2010–11 college basketball season. This was head coach Brooks Thompson's fifth season at UTSA. They played their home games at the Convocation Center. The Roadrunners finished the season 20–14, 9–7 in Southland play to finish in third place in the West Division. They won the Southland Basketball tournament to advance to the NCAA tournament. UTSA defeated Alabama State in the First Four, 70–61, before falling to top-seed Ohio State in the round of 64.

== Roster ==
2010–11 UTSA Roadrunners men's basketball team
Players
Coaches

| Pos. | # | Name | Height | Weight | Year | Previous school | Hometown |
|---|---|---|---|---|---|---|---|
| F | 1 | Stephen Franklin | 6 ft 6 in (1.98 m) | 205 lb (93 kg) | Fr | Eastern Utah | Aurora, CO |
| F | 3 | Larry Wilkins | 6 ft 4 in (1.93 m) | 250 lb (113 kg) | Fr | Midland | San Antonio, TX |
| G | 4 | Sei Paye | 6 ft 3 in (1.91 m) | 170 lb (77 kg) | Fr | Louisiana-Monroe | Houston, TX |
| G | 5 | Michael Hale III | 5 ft 9 in (1.75 m) | 150 lb (68 kg) | So | North Idaho | Federal Way, WA |
| F | 12 | Jeromie Hill | 6 ft 8 in (2.03 m) | 230 lb (104 kg) | Fr | AIS | Cairns, Australia |
| F | 13 | Igor Nujic | 6 ft 8 in (2.03 m) | 215 lb (98 kg) | Fr | AIS | Perth, Australia |
| F/C | 14 | Alex Vouyoukas | 6 ft 9 in (2.06 m) | 235 lb (107 kg) | Jr | Indian Hills CC | Athens, Greece |
| G | 20 | Ryan Whitehead | 6 ft 0 in (1.83 m) | 190 lb (86 kg) | Fr | Desert Edge | Goodyear, AZ |
| G | 21 | Devin Gibson | 6 ft 0 in (1.83 m) | 190 lb (86 kg) | Sr | Cypress Falls | Houston, TX |
| G | 22 | Kannon Burrage | 6 ft 3 in (1.91 m) | 185 lb (84 kg) | So | Des Moines Area CC | East Moline, IL |
| G | 31 | Melvin Johnson III | 6 ft 5 in (1.96 m) | 165 lb (75 kg) | So | Christian Life Area | Dallas, TX |
| G/F | 32 | Jordan Sims | 6 ft 4 in (1.93 m) | 185 lb (84 kg) | Fr | Liberty | El Mirage, AZ |
| F | 42 | Tyler Wood | 6 ft 6 in (1.98 m) | 230 lb (104 kg) | Fr | Madison | San Antonio, TX |

Head coach

- Brooks Thompson (Oklahoma State)

Assistant coach(es)

- Dan O'Dowd (Bethany (KS))
- Robert Guster (Missouri State)
- Jeff Renegar (Adams State)

Legend

- (C) Team captain
- (S) Suspended
- (I) Ineligible
- (W) Walk-on
- Injured
- Current redshirt

== Schedule and results ==
- All times are Central

| Date time, TV | Rank^{#} | Opponent^{#} | Result | Record | Site (attendance) city, state |
Regular season
| Nov 12, 2010* | | Huston–Tillotson | W 82–65 | 1–0 | Convocation Center (1,789); San Antonio, TX |
| Nov 17, 2010* | | at Evansville | L 73–77 | 1–1 | Roberts Stadium (3,768); Evansville, Indiana |
| Nov 19, 2010 | | Cameron | W 71–61 | 2–1 | Convocation Center (1,563); San Antonio, Texas |
| Nov 22, 2010* | | Troy | W 81–70 | 3–1 | Convocation Center (1,073); San Antonio, Texas |
| Nov 30, 2010* | | San Jose State | W 72–63 | 4–1 | Convocation Center (1,434); San Antonio, Texas |
| Dec 2, 2010* | | at UC Riverside | L 75–82 | 4–2 | UCR Student Rec Center (522); Riverside, California |
| Dec 4, 2010* | | at Pepperdine | W 86–81 | 5–2 | Firestone Fieldhouse (1,154); Malibu, California |
| Dec 11, 2010* | | at Houston | W 68–63 | 6–2 | Hofheinz Pavilion (2,955); Houston, Texas |
| Dec 20, 2010* | | Samford | L 73–74 | 6–3 | Convocation Center (1,432); San Antonio, Texas |
| Dec 23, 2010* | | at Tulsa | L 67–92 | 6–4 | Donald W. Reynolds Center (5,194); Tulsa, Oklahoma |
| Dec 30, 2010* | | at Bowling Green | L 59–70 | 6–5 | Anderson Arena (1,229); Bowling Green, Ohio |
| Jan 3, 2011* | | at Oklahoma State | L 63–79 | 6–6 | Gallagher-Iba Arena (9,759); Stillwater, Oklahoma |
| Jan 8, 2011 | | Sam Houston State | L 59–62 | 6–7 (0–1) | Convocation Center (1,376); San Antonio, Texas |
| Jan 12, 2011 | | at Texas A&M–Corpus Christi | W 55–47 | 7–7 (1–1) | American Bank Center (1,065); Corpus Christi, Texas |
| Jan 15, 2011 | | Stephen F. Austin | L 59–68 | 7–8 (1–2) | Convocation Center (1,312); San Antonio, Texas |
| Jan 19, 2011 | | at Northwestern State | W 63–58 | 8–8 (2–2) | Prather Coliseum (1,615); Natchitoches, Louisiana |
| Jan 22, 2011 | | Texas State | W 88–84 | 9–8 (3–2) | Convocation Center (2,856); San Antonio, Texas |
| Jan 24, 2011* | | Oklahoma Panhandle State | W 71–50 | 10–8 | Convocation Center (1,211); San Antonio, Texas |
| Jan 29, 2011 | | at Sam Houston State | L 67–88 | 10–9 (3–3) | Johnson Coliseum (1,168); Huntsville, Texas |
| Feb 2, 2011 | | Texas–Arlington | W 70–62 | 11–9 (4–3) | Convocation Center (1,215); San Antonio, Texas |
| Feb 5, 2011 | | Lamar | W 70–64 | 12–9 (5–3) | Convocation Center (3,066); San Antonio, Texas |
| Feb 9, 2011 | | at Southeastern Louisiana | L 73–79 | 12–10 (5–4) | University Center (720); Hammond, Louisiana |
| Feb 12, 2011 | | at Stephen F. Austin | L 66–70 | 12–11 (5–5) | William R. Johnson Coliseum (2,307); Nacogdoches, Texas |
| Feb 16, 2011 | | McNeese State | W 65–61 | 13–11 (6–5) | Convocation Center (1,157); San Antonio, Texas |
Southland Conference Tournament
| Mar 9, 2011 | | vs. Northwestern State; Quarterfinals | W 97–96 | 17–13 | Leonard E. Merrell Center (1,353); Katy, Texas |
| Mar 10, 2011 | | vs. Sam Houston State; Semifinals | W 79–70 | 18–13 | Leonard E. Merrell Center (1,831); Katy, Texas |
| Mar 12, 2011 | | vs. McNeese State; Championship Game | W 75–72 | 19–13 | Leonard E. Merrell Center (2,758); Katy, Texas |
NCAA Tournament
| Mar 16, 2011* | (16 E) | vs. (16 E) Alabama State; First Four | W 70–61 | 20–13 | University of Dayton Arena (10,192); Dayton, Ohio |
| Mar 18, 2011 | (16 E) | vs. (1 E) No. 1 Ohio State; Second Round | L 46–75 | 20–14 | Quicken Loans Arena (20,164); Cleveland, Ohio |
*Non-conference game. ^{#}Rankings from AP poll. (#) Tournament seedings in parentheses. E=East.
