= 2010–11 McNeese State Cowboys basketball team =

American college basketball season

2010–11 McNeese State Cowboys basketball

Southland Conference Regular Season champions

NIT, First round
- Conference: Southland Conference
- East Division
- Record: 21–12 (11–5 SLC)
- Head coach: Dave Simmons (5th season)
- Assistant coaches: David Dumars; Patrick Haynes; Steve Welch
- Home arena: Burton Coliseum

2010–11 Southland Conference men's basketball standings
| | Conf. | | | | Overall |
| Team | W | | L | PCT | W | | L | PCT |
|---|---|---|---|---|---|---|---|---|
East
| McNeese State | 11 | – | 5 | .688 | 21 | – | 12 | .636 |
| Northwestern State | 10 | – | 6 | .625 | 18 | – | 14 | .563 |
| Southeastern Louisiana | 9 | – | 7 | .563 | 15 | – | 14 | .517 |
| Nicholls State | 8 | – | 8 | .500 | 14 | – | 14 | .500 |
| Lamar | 7 | – | 9 | .438 | 13 | – | 17 | .433 |
| Central Arkansas | 1 | – | 15 | .063 | 5 | – | 24 | .172 |
West
| Sam Houston State | 10 | – | 6 | .625 | 18 | – | 13 | .581 |
| Texas State | 10 | – | 6 | .625 | 16 | – | 16 | .500 |
| Stephen F. Austin | 9 | – | 7 | .563 | 18 | – | 11 | .621 |
| UTSA † | 9 | – | 7 | .563 | 20 | – | 14 | .588 |
| Texas–Arlington | 7 | – | 9 | .438 | 13 | – | 16 | .448 |
| Texas A&M–Corpus Christi | 5 | – | 11 | .313 | 10 | – | 21 | .323 |
† 2011 Southland tournament winner As of March 14, 2011; Rankings from AP poll

The 2010–11 McNeese State Cowboys basketball team represented McNeese State University in the 2010–11 NCAA Division I men's basketball season. The Cowboys, led by head coach Dave Simmons, played their home games at the Burton Coliseum in Lake Charles, Louisiana, as members of the Southland Conference. The Cowboys were regular-season champions in the Southland Conference, eventually advancing to the championship game of the Southland Conference tournament, where they were defeated by UTSA.

McNeese State failed to qualify for the NCAA tournament, but received an automatic bid to the 2011 NIT as the regular-season champions of the Southland. The Cowboys were eliminated in the first round of the NIT by Boston College, 82–64.

== Roster ==
2010–11 McNeese State Cowboys men's basketball team
Players
Coaches

| Pos. | # | Name | Height | Weight | Year | Hometown |
|---|---|---|---|---|---|---|
| G | 0 | Diego Kapelan | 6 ft 3 in (1.91 m) | — | Sr | Bihać, Bosnia and Herzegovina |
| PG | 2 | Jeremie Mitchell | 6 ft 3 in (1.91 m) | — | So | Monroe, Louisiana |
| F | 3 | Patrick Richard | 6 ft 4 in (1.93 m) | — | Jr | Carencro, Louisiana |
| PG | 5 | Dontae Cannon | 6 ft 1 in (1.85 m) | — | So | Alexandria, Louisiana |
| G | 10 | Brandon Regis | 6 ft 3 in (1.91 m) | — | So | Addison, Texas |
| F | 15 | Will Brown | 6 ft 9 in (2.06 m) | — | Jr | Los Angeles, California |
| F | 20 | Adrian Fields | 6 ft 5 in (1.96 m) | — | RS Fr | Opelousas, Louisiana |
| G | 22 | Stephan Martin | 6 ft 0 in (1.83 m) | — | Sr | Lacassine, Louisiana |
| G | 23 | CJ Collins | 5 ft 10 in (1.78 m) | — | Sr | Lake Charles, Louisiana |
| F | 24 | Mari Konate | 6 ft 8 in (2.03 m) | — | Jr | Janville, France |
| C | 32 | Preston David | 6 ft 10 in (2.08 m) | — | Sr | Farmers Branch, Texas |
| F | 35 | Tyson Queen | 6 ft 5 in (1.96 m) | — | Jr | Baytown, Texas |
| F | 43 | PJ Alawoya | 6 ft 7 in (2.01 m) | — | Sr | Houston, Texas |
| C | 52 | Rudy Turner | 6 ft 9 in (2.06 m) | — | Sr | Boyce, Louisiana |
| F | 54 | Daniel Richard | 6 ft 9 in (2.06 m) | — | Jr | Lake Charles, Louisiana |

Head coach

- Dave Simmons (Louisiana Tech)

Assistant coach(es)

- David Dumars (Louisiana–Monroe)
- Patrick Haynes (McNeese State)
- Steve Welch (Southeastern Louisiana)

Legend

- (C) Team captain
- (S) Suspended
- (I) Ineligible
- (W) Walk-on
- Injured
- Current redshirt

Roster
Last update: January 7, 2023

== Schedule and results ==
| Date time, TV | Rank^{#} | Opponent^{#} | Result | Record | Site city, state |
Regular season
| November 13, 2010*; 3:00 pm | | at No. 18 Washington | L 64–118 | 0–1 | Hec Edmundson Pavilion (8,914); Seattle, Washington |
| November 16, 2010*; 7:00 pm | | Georgia State | W 68–62 | 1–1 | Burton Coliseum (621); Lake Charles, LA |
| November 20, 2010*; 3:00 pm | | Louisiana College | W 92–53 | 2–1 | Burton Coliseum (254); Lake Charles, LA |
| November 22, 2010*; 7:05 pm | | at Southern Miss | L 60–75 | 2–2 | Reed Green Coliseum (2,834); Hattiesburg, MS |
| November 24, 2010*; 7:00 pm | | at Miami (FL) | L 59–79 | 2–3 | BankUnited Center (4,337); Coral Gables, FL |
| December 1, 2010*; 7:00 pm | | Louisiana–Lafayette | W 69–66 | 3–3 | Burton Coliseum (978); Lake Charles, LA |
| December 9, 2010*; 7:00 pm | | Jarvis Christian | W 96–91 | 4–3 | Burton Coliseum (433); Lake Charles, Louisiana |
| December 11, 2010*; 3:00 pm | | Louisiana Tech | W 80–70 | 5–3 | Burton Coliseum (619); Lake Charles, LA |
| December 13, 2010*; 7:00 pm | | Southwestern Assemblies of God | W 84–66 | 6–3 | Burton Coliseum (333); Lake Charles, LA |
| December 16, 2010*; 7:00 pm | | at LSU | L 66–78 ^{OT} | 6–4 | Pete Maravich Assembly Center (6,445); Baton Rouge, LA |
| December 19, 2010*; 3:00 pm | | Sacramento State | W 65–63 | 7–4 | Lake Charles Civic Center (355); Lake Charles, LA |
| December 21, 2010*; 7:05 pm | | University of the Southwest | W 100–61 | 8–4 | Burton Coliseum (735); Lake Charles, LA |
| December 31, 2010*; 3:00 pm | | No. 18 Texas A&M | L 57–66 | 8–5 | Reed Arena (8,209); College Station, TX |
| January 8, 2011; 3:00 pm | | Texas A&M–Corpus Christi | W 72–49 | 9–5 (1–0) | Burton Coliseum (504); Lake Charles, LA |
| January 12, 2011; 7:00 pm | | at Lamar | W 78–76 | 10–5 (2–0) | Montagne Center (4,164); Beaumont, TX |
| January 15, 2011; 3:00 pm | | Texas State | W 97–92 | 11–5 (3–0) | Burton Coliseum (672); Lake Charles, LA |
| January 19, 2011; 7:00 pm | | at Southeastern Louisiana | L 77–80 | 11–6 (3–1) | University Center (1,626); Hammond, LA |
| January 22, 2011 | | at Northwestern State | L 77–87 ^{OT} | 11–7 (3–2) | Prather Coliseum (2,415); Natchitoches, LA |
| January 26, 2011; 7:05 pm | | at Nicholls State | W 66–65 | 12–7 (4–2) | Stopher Gymnasium (1,403); Thibodaux, LA |
| January 29, 2011; 4:30 pm | | at Central Arkansas | W 70–63 | 13–7 (5–2) | Farris Center (1,713); Conway, AR |
| February 5, 2011; 6:00 pm | | at Stephen F. Austin | L 60–65 | 13–8 (5–3) | William R. Johnson Coliseum (3,165); Nacogdoches, TX |
| February 12, 2011; 3:00 pm | | Central Arkansas | W 81–67 | 14–8 (6–3) | Burton Coliseum (1,913); Lake Charles, LA |
| February 14, 2011; 7:00 pm | | Sam Houston State | W 73–63 | 15–8 (7–3) | Burton Coliseum (1,272); Lake Charles, LA |
| February 16, 2011; 7:05 pm | | at UTSA | L 61–65 | 15–9 (7–4) | Convocation Center (1,157); San Antonio, TX |
| February 19, 2011; 3:00 pm | | Northwestern State | W 73–63 | 16–9 (8–4) | Burton Coliseum (2,342); Lake Charles, LA |
| February 23, 2011; 7:00 pm | | at Texas–Arlington | W 81–72 | 17–9 (9–4) | Texas Hall (817); Arlington, TX |
| February 26, 2011; 3:00 pm | | Nicholls State | W 71–51 | 18–9 (10–4) | Burton Coliseum (1,191); Lake Charles, LA |
| March 2, 2011; 7:00 pm | | Southeastern Louisiana | L 74–81 | 18–10 (10–5) | Burton Coliseum (1,375); Lake Charles, LA |
| March 5, 2011; 3:00 pm | | Lamar | W 92–74 | 19–10 (11–5) | Burton Coliseum (3,704); Lake Charles, LA |
Southland tournament
| March 9, 2011; 6:30 pm | (1) | vs. (8) Nicholls State; Southland Quarterfinals | W 71–64 | 20–10 | Merrell Center (1,292); Katy, TX |
| March 10, 2011; 8:30 pm | (1) | vs. (4) Texas State; Southland Semifinals | W 91–83 | 21–10 | Merrell Center (1,831); Katy, TX |
| March 12, 2011; 3:05 pm | (1) | vs. (7) UTSA; Southland Championship | L 72–75 | 21–11 | Merrell Center (2,758); Katy, TX |
NIT
| March 15, 2011; 8:00 pm | (8 BC) | (1 BC) Boston College; NIT First Round | L 64–82 | 21–12 | Burton Coliseum (5,035); Lake Charles, LA |
*Non-conference game. ^{#}Rankings from AP Poll. (#) Tournament seedings in parentheses. BC=NIT Boston College bracket. All times are in Central Time.
