= 2018–19 Western Kentucky Hilltoppers basketball team =

American college basketball season

2018–19 Western Kentucky Hilltoppers basketball
- Conference: Conference USA
- Record: 20–14 (11–7 C-USA)
- Head coach: Rick Stansbury (3rd season)
- Assistant coaches: Hennssy Auriantal; Marc Hsu; Nikita Johnson
- Home arena: E. A. Diddle Arena

2018–19 Conference USA men's basketball standings
	Conf.				Overall
Team	W		L	PCT	W		L	PCT
Old Dominion †	13	–	5	.722	26	–	9	.743
Western Kentucky	11	–	7	.611	20	–	14	.588
Southern Miss	11	–	7	.611	20	–	13	.606
UTSA	11	–	7	.611	17	–	15	.531
UAB	10	–	8	.556	20	–	15	.571
Marshall	11	–	7	.611	23	–	14	.622
FIU	10	–	8	.556	20	–	13	.606
Louisiana Tech	9	–	9	.500	20	–	13	.606
Florida Atlantic	8	–	10	.444	17	–	16	.515
North Texas	8	–	10	.444	21	–	12	.636
Rice	8	–	10	.444	13	–	19	.406
Middle Tennessee	8	–	10	.444	11	–	21	.344
Charlotte	5	–	13	.278	8	–	21	.276
UTEP	3	–	15	.167	8	–	21	.276
† 2019 C-USA tournament winner

The 2018–19 Western Kentucky Hilltoppers men's basketball team represented Western Kentucky University during the 2018–19 NCAA Division I men's basketball season. The Hilltoppers, led by third-year head coach Rick Stansbury, played their home games at E. A. Diddle Arena in Bowling Green, Kentucky as fifth-year members of Conference USA (C-USA). The team finished the season tied for second place in the conference, and were defeated in the championship game of the conference tournament.

== Previous season ==
The Hilltoppers finished the 2017–18 season with 27–11, 14–4 in C-USA play, to finish in third place. They defeated UAB and Old Dominion to advance to the championship game of the C-USA tournament, where they lost to Marshall. They received an at-large bid to the National Invitation Tournament, where they defeated Boston College, USC and Oklahoma State to advance to the semifinals where they lost to Utah.

== Offseason ==
=== Departures ===
Name	Number	Pos.	Height	Weight	Year	Hometown	Reason for departure
Tyler Miller	0	G	6' 4"	190	Senior	Louisville, KY	Graduated
Darius Thompson	15	G	6' 4"	190	RS senior	Murfreesboro, TN	Graduated
Dwight Coleby	22	F	6' 9"	245	RS senior	Nassau, Bahamas	Graduated
Justin Johnson	23	F	6' 7"	245	Senior	Hazard, KY	Graduated

=== Incoming transfers ===
Name	Number	Pos.	Height	Weight	Year	Hometown	Previous school
Matthew Horton	5	F	6' 11"		Junior	Tuscaloosa, AL	Junior college transferred from Shelton State CC
Desean Murray	13	F	6' 3"	225	Graduate student	Stanley, NC	Transferred from Auburn. Was eligible to play immediately since Murray graduated from Auburn.
Patrick Murphy		F	6' 6"	170	Junior	Franklin, TN	Junior college transferred from Martin Methodist College
Carson Williams		F	6' 5"	230	Junior	Owenton, KY	Transferred from Northern Kentucky. Under NCAA transfer rules, Williams had to sit out for the 2018–19 season. Had two years of remaining eligibility.

=== 2018 recruiting class ===
College recruiting
Name	Hometown	School	Height	Weight	Commit date
Charles Bassey #3 C	San Antonio, TX	ASPIRE Academy	6 ft 10 in (2.08 m)	220 lb (100 kg)	Jun 13, 2018
Charles Bassey #3 C	Recruit ratings: Scout: Rivals: 247Sports: ESPN: (92)				
Galen Smith; PF	Bay St. Louis, MS	Bay High School	6 ft 10 in (2.08 m)	220 lb (100 kg)	Nov 9, 2017
Galen Smith; PF	Recruit ratings: Scout: Rivals: 247Sports: ESPN: (NR)				
Dalano Banton; SG	Toronto, ON	Redemption Christian Academy	6 ft 6 in (1.98 m)	180 lb (82 kg)	Nov 14, 2017
Dalano Banton; SG	Recruit ratings: Scout: Rivals: 247Sports: ESPN: (NR)				
Jeremiah Gambrell Jr. SG	Houston, TX	Madison High School	6 ft 0 in (1.83 m)	170 lb (77 kg)	Nov 14, 2017
Jeremiah Gambrell Jr. SG	Recruit ratings: Scout: Rivals: 247Sports: ESPN: (NR)				
Overall recruit ranking:
Note: In many cases, Scout, Rivals, 247Sports, On3, and ESPN may conflict in their listings of height and weight.; In these cases, the average was taken. ESPN grades are on a 100-point scale.; Sources: "2018 Team Ranking". Rivals.

== Roster ==
2018–19 WKU Hilltoppers men's basketball team
Players
Coaches

Pos.	#	Name	Height	Weight	Year	Previous school	Hometown
F	00	Tolu Smith	6 ft 10 in (2.08 m)	240 lb (109 kg)	Fr	Kahuku HS	Bay St. Louis, MS
G	1	Lamonte Bearden	6 ft 3 in (1.91 m)	170 lb (77 kg)	RS Sr	Buffalo	Milwaukee, WI
G/F	2	Jared Savage	6 ft 5 in (1.96 m)	200 lb (91 kg)	RS Jr	Austin Peay	Bowling Green, KY
F	4	Josh Anderson	6 ft 6 in (1.98 m)	195 lb (88 kg)	So	Madison Prep Academy	Baton Rouge, LA
F	5	Matt Horton	6 ft 11 in (2.11 m)	235 lb (107 kg)	Jr	Shelton State Community College	Tuscaloosa, AL
G	10	Jeremiah Gambrell	6 ft 2 in (1.88 m)	160 lb (73 kg)	Fr	Madison HS	Houston, TX
G	11	Taveion Hollingsworth	6 ft 2 in (1.88 m)	165 lb (75 kg)	So	Paul Laurence Dunbar HS	Lexington, KY
F	12	Moustapha Diagne	6 ft 9 in (2.06 m)	230 lb (104 kg)	RS Jr	Northwest Florida State College	Rufisque, Senegal
F	13	DeSean Murray	6 ft 4 in (1.93 m)	215 lb (98 kg)	GS	Auburn	Stanley, NC
F	14	Marek Nelson	6 ft 7 in (2.01 m)	185 lb (84 kg)	So	Sunrise Christian Academy (KS)	Plano, TX
G	20	Dalano Banton	6 ft 8 in (2.03 m)	195 lb (88 kg)	Fr	Redemption Christian Academy (NY)	Toronto, ON
C	23	Charles Bassey	6 ft 11 in (2.11 m)	245 lb (111 kg)	Fr	Aspire Academy	Lagos, Nigeria
G		Patrick Murphy	6 ft 5 in (1.96 m)	165 lb (75 kg)	Jr	Martin Methodist College	Franklin, TN
F		Carson Williams (redshirt)	6 ft 5 in (1.96 m)	230 lb (104 kg)	Jr	Northern Kentucky	Owenton, KY

Head coach

- Rick Stansbury (Campbellsville)

Assistant coach(es)

- Hennssy Auriantal (Wisconsin)
- Marc Hsu (Cabrini)
- Nikita Johnson (West Georgia)

Legend

- (C) Team captain
- (S) Suspended
- (I) Ineligible
- (W) Walk-on
- Injured
- Current redshirt

Roster
Last update: October 5, 2024

== Schedule and results ==
Date time, TV	Rank^{#}	Opponent^{#}	Result	Record	Site (attendance) city, state
Exhibition
October 30, 2018*; 7:00 p.m.		Campbellsville	W 91–66		E. A. Diddle Arena; Bowling Green, KY
November 3, 2018*; 2:00 p.m.		Kentucky Wesleyan	W 96–71		E. A. Diddle Arena; Bowling Green, KY
Non-conference regular season
November 6, 2018*; 9:30 p.m., ESPNU		at No. 25 Washington	L 55–73	0–1	Alaska Airlines Arena (5,721); Seattle, WA
November 10, 2018*; 6:00 p.m., ESPN3		UT Martin; Myrtle Beach Invitational campus-site game	W 86–71	1–1	E. A. Diddle Arena (5,815); Bowling Green, KY
November 15, 2018*; 4:00 p.m., ESPNU		vs. Valparaiso; Myrtle Beach Invitational quarterfinals	W 81–73	2–1	HTC Center (3,620); Conway, SC
November 16, 2018*; 8:00 p.m., ESPNU		vs. West Virginia; Myrtle Beach Invitational semifinals	W 63–57	3–1	HTC Center (3,370); Conway, SC
November 18, 2018*; 6:30 p.m., ESPN2		vs. UCF; Myrtle Beach Invitational championship	L 62–78	3–2	HTC Center (3,018); Conway, SC
November 24, 2018*; 1:00 p.m., ESPN3		at Indiana State	L 54–63	3–3	Hulman Center (3,032); Terre Haute, IN
December 1, 2018*; 6:00 p.m., ESPN+		Tennessee State	W 88–74	4–3	E. A. Diddle Arena (6,071); Bowling Green, KY
December 5, 2018*; 7:00 p.m., ESPN+		at Missouri State	L 78–84	4–4	JQH Arena (4,893); Springfield, MO
December 8, 2018*; 2:30 p.m., SECN		at Arkansas	W 78–77	5–4	Bud Walton Arena (14,488); Fayetteville, AR
December 16, 2018*; 2:00 p.m., ESPN3		Troy	L 81–87	5–5	E. A. Diddle Arena (5,285); Bowling Green, KY
December 19, 2018*; 6:30 p.m., ESPN3		at Belmont	L 74–80	5–6	Curb Event Center (4,124); Nashville, TN
December 22, 2018*; 2:00 p.m., Facebook		Saint Mary's	W 71–68	6–6	E. A. Diddle Arena (5,026); Bowling Green, KY
December 29, 2018*; 4:30 p.m., CBSSN		No. 15 Wisconsin	W 83–76	7–6	E. A. Diddle Arena (7,614); Bowling Green, KY
Conference USA regular season
January 3, 2019; 6:30 p.m., beIN		at Charlotte	W 68–50	8–6 (1–0)	Dale F. Halton Arena (3,019); Charlotte, NC
January 5, 2019; 6:00 p.m., Facebook		at Old Dominion	L 66–69	8–7 (1–1)	Ted Constant Convocation Center (6,928); Norfolk, VA
January 12, 2019; 6:00 p.m., Facebook		at Marshall	L 69–70	8–8 (1–2)	Cam Henderson Center (7,687); Huntington, WV
January 17, 2019; 7:00 p.m., beIN		FIU	L 76–77	8–9 (1–3)	E. A. Diddle Arena (5,102); Bowling Green, KY
January 19, 2019; 2:00 p.m., Facebook		Florida Atlantic	W 72–66	9–9 (2–3)	E. A. Diddle Arena (4,963); Bowling Green, KY
January 21, 2019; 8:00 p.m., CBSSN		Marshall	W 68–59	10–9 (3–3)	E. A. Diddle Arena (6,369); Bowling Green, KY
January 24, 2019; 7:00 p.m., Stadium		at Southern Miss	W 66–63	11–9 (4–3)	Reed Green Coliseum (2,568); Hattiesburg, MS
January 26, 2019; 4:00 p.m., Facebook		at Louisiana Tech	L 50–62	11–10 (4–4)	Thomas Assembly Center (3,917); Ruston, LA
January 31, 2019; 7:00 p.m., Facebook		UTSA	W 96–88 ^{1OT}	12–10 (5–4)	E. A. Diddle Arena (4,983); Bowling Green, KY
February 2, 2019; 6:00 p.m., ESPN+		UTEP	W 76–59	13–10 (6–4)	E. A. Diddle Arena (6,397); Bowling Green, KY
February 7, 2019; 8:00 p.m., CBSSN		at Rice	W 92–85 ^{2OT}	14–10 (7–4)	Tudor Fieldhouse (1,757); Houston, TX
February 9, 2019; 5:00 p.m., Facebook		at North Texas	W 62–59	15–10 (8–4)	UNT Coliseum (8,195); Denton, TX
February 14, 2019; 7:00 p.m., Facebook		Middle Tennessee; 100 Miles of Hate	W 71–63	16–10 (9–4)	E. A. Diddle Arena (6,044); Bowling Green, KY
February 16, 2019; 2:00 p.m., Facebook		UAB	L 60–68	16–11 (9–5)	E. A. Diddle Arena (6,839); Bowling Green, KY
February 23, 2019; 12:00 p.m., Stadium		at Old Dominion	L 63–67	16–12 (9–6)	Ted Constant Convocation Center (7,324); Norfolk, VA
February 28, 2019; 6:30 p.m., beIn		at UAB	W 73–67	17–12 (10–6)	Bartow Arena (3,021); Birmingham, AL
March 3, 2019; 2:00 p.m., Facebook		Southern Miss	W 76–71	18–12 (11–6)	E. A. Diddle Arena (5,408); Bowling Green, KY
March 6, 2019; 6:30 p.m., beIn		UTSA	L 76–81 ^{OT}	18–13 (11–7)	E. A. Diddle Arena (5,411); Bowling Green, KY
Conference USA tournament
March 14, 2019; 8:30 p.m., Stadium	(2)	vs. (10) North Texas; Quarterfinals	W 67–51	19–13	Ford Center at The Star; Frisco, TX
March 15, 2019; 3:00 p.m., CBSSN	(2)	vs. (3) Southern Miss; Semifinals	W 70–59	20–13	Ford Center at The Star; Frisco, TX
March 16, 2019; 7:30 p.m., CBSSN	(2)	vs. (1) Old Dominion; Championship	L 56–62	20–14	Ford Center at The Star (3,017); Frisco, TX
*Non-conference game. ^{#}Rankings from AP poll. (#) Tournament seedings in parentheses. All times are in Central.

== See also ==
- 2018–19 Western Kentucky Lady Toppers basketball team
