= 2004 Southland Conference men's basketball tournament =

American basketball tournament

- Classification: Division I
- Season: 2003–04
- Teams: 8
- First round site: Campus sites
- Semifinals site: Campus sites
- Finals site: Convocation Center; San Antonio, Texas
- Champions: UTSA (2nd title)
- Winning coach: Tim Carter (2nd title)
- MVP: LeRoy Hurd (UTSA)

2003–04 Southland Conference men's basketball standings
	Conf.				Overall
Team	W		L	PCT	W		L	PCT
Southeastern Louisiana	11	–	5	.688	20	–	9	.690
Texas–Arlington	11	–	5	.688	17	–	12	.586
UTSA †	11	–	5	.688	19	–	14	.576
Stephen F. Austin	10	–	6	.625	21	–	9	.700
Sam Houston State	8	–	8	.500	13	–	15	.464
Texas State	8	–	8	.500	13	–	15	.464
Northwestern State	8	–	8	.500	11	–	17	.393
Louisiana–Monroe	8	–	8	.500	12	–	19	.387
McNeese State	7	–	9	.438	11	–	16	.407
Lamar	5	–	11	.313	11	–	18	.379
Nicholls State	1	–	15	.063	6	–	21	.222
† 2004 Southland tournament winner

The 2004 Southland Conference men's basketball tournament took place March 8–12, 2004. The quarterfinal and semifinal rounds were played at the home arena of the higher seeded-teams, with the championship game played at Convocation Center in San Antonio, Texas.

Third-seeded UTSA won the championship game over fourth-seeded Stephen F. Austin, and earned the conference's automatic bid to the NCAA tournament. LeRoy Hurd of Texas–San Antonio was named the tournament's MVP.

== Format ==
The top eight eligible men's basketball teams in the Southland Conference received a berth in the conference tournament. After the conference season, teams were seeded by conference record. For the semifinal round, the remaining teams were reseeded.

== Bracket ==
Quarterfinals; March 8
1	Texas–Arlington	77
8	Louisiana–Monroe	62
4	Stephen F. Austin	85
5	Sam Houston State	53
(Pairings are reseeded after the first round)
3	UTSA	78
6	Texas State	73
2	Southeastern Louisiana	72
7	Northwestern State	64

Semifinals; March 10
1	Texas–Arlington	68
4	Stephen F. Austin	69
3	UTSA	87
2	Southeastern Louisiana	85

Finals; March 12
4	Stephen F. Austin	70
3	UTSA	74
