= 1999 Southland Conference men's basketball tournament =

Basketball Tournament March 1999 in Louisiana

- Classification: Division I
- Season: 1998–99
- Teams: 6
- Site: Hirsch Memorial Coliseum; Shreveport, Louisiana
- Champions: UTSA Roadrunners (1st title)
- Winning coach: Tim Carter (1st title)

1998–99 Southland Conference men's basketball standings
| | Conf. | | | | Overall |
| Team | W | | L | PCT | W | | L | PCT |
|---|---|---|---|---|---|---|---|---|
| Southwest Texas State | 13 | – | 5 | .722 | 19 | – | 9 | .679 |
| UTSA † | 12 | – | 6 | .667 | 18 | – | 11 | .621 |
| Nicholls State | 12 | – | 6 | .667 | 14 | – | 15 | .483 |
| Northeast Louisiana | 12 | – | 6 | .667 | 13 | – | 14 | .481 |
| Lamar | 11 | – | 7 | .611 | 17 | – | 11 | .607 |
| McNeese State | 11 | – | 7 | .611 | 13 | – | 15 | .464 |
| Northwestern State | 8 | – | 10 | .444 | 11 | – | 15 | .423 |
| Texas–Arlington | 8 | – | 10 | .444 | 10 | – | 16 | .385 |
| Sam Houston State | 7 | – | 11 | .389 | 10 | – | 16 | .385 |
| Southeastern Louisiana | 3 | – | 15 | .167 | 6 | – | 20 | .231 |
| Stephen F. Austin | 2 | – | 16 | .111 | 4 | – | 22 | .154 |
† 1999 Southland tournament winner

The 1999 Southland Conference men's basketball tournament was held March 4–6 at Hirsch Memorial Coliseum in Shreveport, Louisiana.

UTSA defeated Texas State in the championship game, 71–63, to win their first Southland men's basketball tournament.

The Roadrunners received a bid to the 1999 NCAA Tournament as the No. 16 seed in the West region.

== Format ==
Six of the ten conference members participated in the tournament field. They were seeded based on regular season conference records, with the top two seeds receiving a bye to the semifinal round. Tournament play began with the quarterfinal round.

== Bracket ==
Quarterfinals; March 4
4 | Northeast Louisiana | 71
5 | Lamar | 90
3 | Nicholls State | 87
6 | McNeese State | 100

Semifinals; March 5
1 | Southwest Texas State | 92
6 | McNeese State | 82
5 | Lamar | 63
2 | UTSA | 77

Championship; March 6
1 | Southwest Texas State | 63
2 | UTSA | 71
