= Dave Simmons (basketball, born 1959) =

American basketball player-coach (born 1959)

Current position
- Title: Assistant coach
- Team: Northwestern State
- Conference: Southland

Biographical details
- Born: July 24, 1959 (age 67); DeRidder, Louisiana, U.S.

Playing career
- 1977–1981: Louisiana Tech

Coaching career (HC unless noted)
- 1985–1986: Louisiana Tech (assistant)
- 1986–1987: Delta State (assistant)
- 1987–1994: McNeese State (assistant)
- 1994–1996: Edward Waters
- 1999–2006: Northwestern State (assistant)
- 2006–2018: McNeese State
- 2018–present: Northwestern State (assistant)

Head coaching record
- Overall: 155–211 (.423)

Accomplishments and honors

Championships
- Southland East Division (2011)

Dave Simmons (born July 24, 1959) is the former head men's basketball coach at McNeese State University.

== Div I Head Coaching Record ==
Record table
Season	Team	Overall	Conference	Standing	Postseason
McNeese State Cowboys (Southland Conference) (2006–2018)
2006–07	McNeese State	15–17	9–7	2nd (East)	
2007–08	McNeese State	13–16	7–9	4th (East)	
2008–09	McNeese State	11–18	5–11	4th (East)	
2009–10	McNeese State	10–20	5–11	4th (East)	
2010–11	McNeese State	21–12	11–5	1st (East)	NIT First Round
2011–12	McNeese State	17–16	10–6	2nd (East)	
2012–13	McNeese State	14–17	7–11	7th	
2013–14	McNeese State	11–20	9–9	8th	
2014–15	McNeese State	15–16	8–10	7th	
2015–16	McNeese State	8–21	6–12	8th	
2016–17	McNeese State	7–22	4–14	13th	
2017–18	McNeese State	11–17	8–10	T-8th	
McNeese State:		155–211 (.423)	98–115 (.460)		
Total:		155–211 (.423)			
National champion Postseason invitational champion Conference regular season champion Conference regular season and conference tournament champion Division regular season champion Division regular season and conference tournament champion Conference tournament champion
