= Brooks Thompson =

American basketball player and coach (1970–2016)

Personal information
- Born: July 19, 1970 Dallas, Texas, U.S.
- Died: June 9, 2016 (aged 45) San Antonio, Texas, U.S.
- Listed height: 6 ft 4 in (1.93 m)
- Listed weight: 200 lb (91 kg)

Career information
- High school: Littleton (Littleton, Colorado)
- College: Texas A&M (1989–1991); Oklahoma State (1992–1994)
- NBA draft: 1994: 1st round, 27th overall pick
- Drafted by: Orlando Magic
- Playing career: 1994–1998
- Position: Point guard
- Number: 22, 6, 4, 7
- Coaching career: 1998–2016

Career history

Playing
- 1994–1996: Orlando Magic
- 1996: Utah Jazz
- 1996–1997: Denver Nuggets
- 1997: Iraklis Thessaloniki
- 1997–1998: Phoenix Suns
- 1998: New York Knicks

Coaching
- 1998–1999: Oklahoma State (assistant)
- 1999–2000: Metro Christian Academy Tulsa
- 2000–2001: Southeastern Louisiana (assistant)
- 2001–2002: Oklahoma State (director of operations)
- 2002–2004: Yavapai
- 2004–2006: Arizona State (assistant)
- 2006–2016: UTSA

Career highlights
- As player: Greek League All-Star (1997); First-team All-Big Eight (1994); As head coach: Southland tournament champion (2011)

Career NBA statistics
- Points: 760 (4.5 ppg)
- Rebounds: 158 (0.9 rpg)
- Assists: 281 (1.7 apg)
- Stats at NBA.com
- Stats at Basketball Reference

Brooks James Thompson (July 19, 1970 – June 9, 2016) was an American basketball coach and player, who played for the Orlando Magic, Utah Jazz, Denver Nuggets, Phoenix Suns and New York Knicks of the National Basketball Association (NBA).

== College career ==
Thompson, a 6 ft 4 in (1.93 m) tall point guard, attended and played high school basketball at Littleton High, in Littleton, Colorado. He was named the Colorado Player of the Year in 1989, and he led Littleton to a 24–0 record, and the state's 4A title. After high school, Thompson played college basketball at Texas A&M University. He played with the school's men's team, the Texas A&M Aggies, from 1989 to 1991. Thompson also played college basketball at Oklahoma State University, where he played with the Oklahoma State Cowboys, from 1992 to 1994.

== Professional career ==
Thompson was selected by the NBA's the Orlando Magic, in the first round, with the 27th overall draft pick of the 1994 NBA draft. In his NBA career, Thompson played in a total of 168 regular season games, in which he scored a total 760 points. On November 26, 1996, while a member of the Denver Nuggets, Thompson scored a career high 26 points against the Phoenix Suns. He also played professionally in the Greek Basket League, with Iraklis Thessaloniki.

== Coaching career ==
On April 19, 2006, Thompson was named the head coach of the men's basketball team of the University of Texas at San Antonio. On November 15, 2009, UTSA defeated the University of Iowa, which was UTSA's first ever win versus a Big Ten Conference school. On March 16, 2011, Thompson guided UTSA to the school's first-ever NCAA tournament win, when the Roadrunners defeated Alabama State, by a score of 70–61. On March 10, 2016, Thompson was fired by UTSA, following a 5–27 record.

== Personal life and death ==
In April 2016, Thompson was diagnosed with double organ failure. His condition initially improved from critical to stable, but he had to be rushed to a hospital with sepsis, just days later. He died on June 9, 2016.

== Head coaching record ==
=== Junior college ===
Record table
Season	Team	Overall	Conference	Standing	Postseason
Yavapai Roughriders (Arizona Community College Athletic Conference) (2002–2004)
2002–03	Yavapai CC	34–9	20–4	1st	NJCAA Division I championship
2003–04	Yavapai CC	25–8	19–3	1st	NJCAA Division I championship
Yavapai CC:		59–17 (.776)	39–7 (.848)		
Total:		59–17 (.776)			
National champion Postseason invitational champion Conference regular season champion Conference regular season and conference tournament champion Division regular season champion Division regular season and conference tournament champion Conference tournament champion

=== College ===
Record table
Season	Team	Overall	Conference	Standing	Postseason
UTSA Roadrunners (Southland Conference) (2006–2012)
2006–07	UTSA	7–22	3–13	6th (West)	
2007–08	UTSA	13–17	7–9	T–3rd (West)	
2008–09	UTSA	17–12	8–8	4th (West)	
2009–10	UTSA	19–11	9–7	T–3rd (West)	
2010–11	UTSA	20–14	9–7	T–3rd (West)	NCAA Division I Round of 64
2011–12	UTSA	18–14	10–6	3rd (West)	
UTSA Roadrunners (Western Athletic Conference) (2012–2013)
2012–13	UTSA	9–21	3–14	T–8th	
UTSA Roadrunners (Conference USA) (2013–2016)
2013–14	UTSA	8–22	4–12	T–14th	
2014–15	UTSA	14–16	8–10	T–7th	
2015–16	UTSA	5–27	3–15	14th	
UTSA:		133–178 (.428)	64–101 (.388)		
Total:		133–178 (.428)			
National champion Postseason invitational champion Conference regular season champion Conference regular season and conference tournament champion Division regular season champion Division regular season and conference tournament champion Conference tournament champion
