= 2018–19 UAB Blazers men's basketball team =

American college basketball season

2018–19 UAB Blazers men's basketball

CBI, First Round
- Conference: Conference USA
- Record: 20–15 (10–8 C-USA)
- Head coach: Robert Ehsan (2nd season)
- Assistant coaches: Turner Battle; Dannton Jackson; Kevin Devitt
- Home arena: Bartow Arena

2018–19 Conference USA men's basketball standings
	Conf.				Overall
Team	W		L	PCT	W		L	PCT
Old Dominion †	13	–	5	.722	26	–	9	.743
Western Kentucky	11	–	7	.611	20	–	14	.588
Southern Miss	11	–	7	.611	20	–	13	.606
UTSA	11	–	7	.611	17	–	15	.531
UAB	10	–	8	.556	20	–	15	.571
Marshall	11	–	7	.611	23	–	14	.622
FIU	10	–	8	.556	20	–	13	.606
Louisiana Tech	9	–	9	.500	20	–	13	.606
Florida Atlantic	8	–	10	.444	17	–	16	.515
North Texas	8	–	10	.444	21	–	12	.636
Rice	8	–	10	.444	13	–	19	.406
Middle Tennessee	8	–	10	.444	11	–	21	.344
Charlotte	5	–	13	.278	8	–	21	.276
UTEP	3	–	15	.167	8	–	21	.276
† 2019 C-USA tournament winner

The 2018–19 UAB Blazers basketball team represented the University of Alabama at Birmingham during the 2018–19 NCAA Division I men's basketball season. The Blazers, led by third-year head coach Robert Ehsan, played their home games at the Bartow Arena as members of Conference USA. They finished the season 20–15, 10–8 in C-USA Play to finish in 5th place. They defeated Middle Tennessee and UTSA to advance to the semifinals of the C-USA tournament where they lost to Old Dominion. They received an at-large bid to the College Basketball Invitational where they lost in the first round to Brown.

== Previous season ==
The Blazers finished the 2017–18 season 20–13, 10–8 C-USA play to finish in sixth place. They defeated Florida Atlantic in the first round of the C-USA tournament before losing to Western Kentucky. Despite winning 20 games, they did not participate in a postseason tournament.

== Offseason ==
=== Departures ===
Name	Number	Pos.	Height	Weight	Year	Hometown	Reason for departure
Nick Norton	2	G	5'10"	166	Senior	Bloomington, IL	Graduate transferred to Drake
Chris Cokley	3	F	6'8"	238	Senior	Savannah, GA	Graduated
Deion Lavender	5	G	6'4"	190	RS Junior	Alton, IL	Graduate transferred to Valparaiso
Hunter Reynolds	12	G	6'0"	161	Freshman	Knoxville, TN	Walk-on; left the team for personal reasons
Nate Darling	13	G	6'5"	190	Sophomore	Halifax, NS	Transferred to Delaware
Thomas Smallwood	33	F	7'0"	243	Junior	Bordeaux, France	Graduate transferred to Chattanooga
William Lee	34	F	6'9"	206	Senior	Plantersville, AL	Graduated

=== Incoming transfers ===
Name	Number	Pos.	Height	Weight	Year	Hometown	Previous School
Tyreek Scott-Grayson	0	G	6'5"		Sophomore	Severn, MD	Junior college transferred from State Fair CC
Jeremiah Bell	2	G	6'0"	171	Senior	Louisville, KY	Transferred from Milwaukee. Under NCAA transfer rules, Bell will have to sit out for the 2018–19 season. Will have one year of remaining eligibility.
Willesley Butler	12	F/C	6'8"	230	Junior	Troy, NY	Junior college transferred from Pensacola State College
Will Bathurst	25	G	6'3"	188	RS Senior	Olean, NY	Transferred from Cornell. Will be eligible to play immediately since Bathurst graduated from Cornell.
Nolan Bertain	32	G	6'4"	185	Sophomore	Portland, OR	Junior college transferred from Casper College

=== Incoming recruits ===
College recruiting information
Name	Hometown	School	Height	Weight	Commit date
Jude Akabueze #24 C	Farmington, WV	North Marion High School	6 ft 8 in (2.03 m)	208 lb (94 kg)	Nov 19, 2017
Jude Akabueze #24 C	Recruit ratings: Scout: Rivals: (80)				
Tamel Pearson #31 C	Chicago, IL	Morgan Park High School	6 ft 8 in (2.03 m)	N/A	Sep 4, 2017
Tamel Pearson #31 C	Recruit ratings: Scout: Rivals: (80)				
Tavin Lovan; SG	Franklin, KY	Hargrave Military Academy	6 ft 4 in (1.93 m)	186 lb (84 kg)	Apr 6, 2018
Tavin Lovan; SG	Recruit ratings: Scout: Rivals: 247Sports: (NR)				
Overall recruit ranking:
Note: In many cases, Scout, Rivals, 247Sports, On3, and ESPN may conflict in their listings of height and weight.; In these cases, the average was taken. ESPN grades are on a 100-point scale.; Sources: "2018 Team Ranking". Rivals.

=== Recruiting class of 2019 ===
College recruiting information (2019)
Name	Hometown	School	Height	Weight	Commit date
Jahein Spencer; SG	Napoleonville, LA	Assumption High School	6 ft 4 in (1.93 m)	205 lb (93 kg)	Aug 3, 2018
Jahein Spencer; SG	Recruit ratings: Scout: Rivals: (NR)				
Jalen Benjamin; PG	Norcross, GA	Meadowcreek High School	5 ft 10 in (1.78 m)	135 lb (61 kg)	Aug 28, 2018
Jalen Benjamin; PG	Recruit ratings: Scout: Rivals: (NR)				
Overall recruit ranking:
Note: In many cases, Scout, Rivals, 247Sports, On3, and ESPN may conflict in their listings of height and weight.; In these cases, the average was taken. ESPN grades are on a 100-point scale.; Sources: "2019 Team Ranking". Rivals.

== Roster ==
2018–19 UAB Blazers men's basketball team
Players
Coaches

Pos.	#	Name	Height	Weight	Year	Previous school	Hometown
G	0	Tyreek Scott-Grayson	6 ft 5 in (1.96 m)	170 lb (77 kg)	So	Suffield Academy; State Fair Community College	Brick, New Jersey
G	1	Zack Bryant	6 ft 2 in (1.88 m)	183 lb (83 kg)	So	Providence School	Hastings, Florida
G	1	Jeremiah Bell (redshirt)	6 ft 1 in (1.85 m)	180 lb (82 kg)	Sr	Boyle County High School; Milwaukee	Louisville, Kentucky
G	3	Tavin Lovan	6 ft 4 in (1.93 m)	196 lb (89 kg)	Fr	Franklin-Simpson High School	Franklin, Kentucky
G	4	Anderson McCoy (W)	5 ft 11 in (1.8 m)	166 lb (75 kg)	RS Jr	Center Grove High School; Ancilla College	Indianapolis, Indiana
F	5	Makhtar Gueye	6 ft 10 in (2.08 m)	200 lb (91 kg)	RS Fr	Aspire Academy	Rufisque, Senegal
G	10	Luis Hurtado	6 ft 6 in (1.98 m)	210 lb (95 kg)	RS Fr	The Sagemont School	Mérida, Venezuela
F	11	Tamell Pearson	6 ft 10 in (2.08 m)	212 lb (96 kg)	Fr	Morgan Park High School	Chicago, Illinois
F	12	Will Butler	6 ft 8 in (2.03 m)	255 lb (116 kg)	Jr	Redemption Christian Academy; Pensacola State College	Troy, New York
G	15	Joshua Sippial (W)	6 ft 0 in (1.83 m)	165 lb (75 kg)	Fr	Loveless Academic Magnet Program	Montgomery, Alabama
G	21	Jalen Perry	6 ft 3 in (1.91 m)	197 lb (89 kg)	Sr	Ballard High School; John A. Logan College	Louisville, Kentucky
F	23	Lewis Sullivan	6 ft 7 in (2.01 m)	231 lb (105 kg)	RS Sr	Hazel Green High School	Hazel Green, Alabama
G	25	Will Bathurst	6 ft 3 in (1.91 m)	188 lb (85 kg)	RS Sr	Olean High School; Cornell	Olean, New York
G	32	Nolan Bertain	6 ft 4 in (1.93 m)	188 lb (85 kg)	So	West Linn High School; Casper College	Portland, Oregon
F	34	Jude Akabueze	6 ft 8 in (2.03 m)	260 lb (118 kg)	Fr	North Marion High School	Lagos, Nigeria

Head coach

- Robert Ehsan (UC Davis)

Assistant coach(es)

- Turner Battle (Buffalo)
- Dannton Jackson (Xavier (LA))
- Kevin Devitt (DePaul)

Legend

- (C) Team captain
- (S) Suspended
- (I) Ineligible
- (W) Walk-on
- Injured
- Current redshirt

Roster

== Schedule and results ==
Date time, TV	Rank^{#}	Opponent^{#}	Result	Record	Site (attendance) city, state
Exhibition
Oct 18, 2018*; 7:00 pm		Georgia; Charity Exhibition Game	L 54–56		Bartow Arena (3,437); Birmingham, AL
Nov 1, 2018*; 7:00 pm		Morehouse	W 75–54		Bartow Arena (2,828); Birmingham, AL
Non-conference regular season
Nov 6, 2018*; 7:00 pm, CUSA.TV		Mercer	W 75–67	1–0	Bartow Arena (3,185); Birmingham, AL
Nov 14, 2018*; 7:00 pm, CUSA.TV		New Orleans	W 75–68	2–0	Bartow Arena (2,874); Birmingham, AL
Nov 18, 2018*; 4:00 pm, CUSA.TV		West Alabama; AdvoCare Invitational non-bracket game	W 77–47	3–0	Bartow Arena (2,602); Birmingham, AL
Nov 22, 2018*; 8:30 pm, ESPN2		vs. No. 14 Florida State; AdvoCare Invitational quarterfinals	L 63–81	3–1	HP Field House (2,226); Lake Buena Vista, FL
Nov 23, 2018*; 6:00 pm, ESPN3		vs. College of Charleston; AdvoCare Invitational consolation semifinals	L 51–74	3–2	HP Field House (2,185); Lake Buena Vista, FL
Nov 25, 2018*; 9:30 am, ESPNU		vs. Canisius; AdvoCare Invitational	W 68–58	4–2	HP Field House (3,127); Lake Buena Vista, FL
Nov 29, 2018*; 7:00 pm		at Alabama A&M	W 67–57	5–2	Elmore Gymnasium (2,109); Huntsville, AL
Dec 4, 2018*; 7:00 pm		North Alabama	W 73–67	6–2	Bartow Arena (3,222); Birmingham, AL
Dec 8, 2018*; 12:00 pm, ESPN3		at Memphis	L 76–94	6–3	FedEx Forum (14,652); Memphis, TN
Dec 15, 2018*; 6:30 pm, CBSSN		vs. No. 8 Auburn; Rivalry/Mike Slive Invitational	L 71–75 ^{OT}	6–4	Legacy Arena (15,856); Birmingham, AL
Dec 18, 2018*; 3:30 pm		Alcorn State	W 76–49	7–4	Bartow Arena (2,299); Birmingham, AL
Dec 21, 2018*; 7:00 pm		Troy	L 73–74	7–5	Bartow Arena (3,212); Birmingham, AL
Dec 29, 2018*; 7:00 pm		Arkansas–Monticello	W 75–67	8–5	Bartow Arena (2,629); Birmingham, AL
Conference USA regular season
Jan 3, 2019; 7:00 pm, ESPN+		Florida Atlantic	W 67–50	9–5 (1–0)	Bartow Arena (2,667); Birmingham, AL
Jan 5, 2019; 7:00 pm, ESPN+		FIU	W 84–65	10–5 (2–0)	Bartow Arena (2,878); Birmingham, AL
Jan 10, 2019; 6:30 pm, beIN		at Louisiana Tech	L 53–64	10–6 (2–1)	Thomas Assembly Center (3,081); Ruston, LA
Jan 12, 2019; 4:00 pm, ESPN+		at Southern Miss	L 68–73	10–7 (2–2)	Reed Green Coliseum (2,886); Hattiesburg, MS
Jan 17, 2019; 7:00 pm		UTEP	W 76–63	11–7 (3–2)	Bartow Arena (2,927); Birmingham, AL
Jan 19, 2019; 7:00 pm, ESPN+		UTSA	W 83–73	12–7 (4–2)	Bartow Arena (3,256); Birmingham, AL
Jan 24, 2019; 7:00 pm, beIN		at North Texas	W 52–49	13–7 (5–2)	The Super Pit (4,368); Denton, TX
Jan 26, 2019; 7:00 pm, ESPN+		at Rice	W 89–86	14–7 (6–2)	Tudor Fieldhouse (1,731); Houston, TX
Jan 30, 2019; 6:30 pm, ESPN+		at Middle Tennessee	L 65–71	14–8 (6–3)	Murphy Center (3,963); Murfreesboro, TN
Feb 2, 2019; 7:00 pm, ESPN+		Middle Tennessee	L 78–79	14–9 (6–4)	Bartow Arena (4,075); Birmingham, AL
Feb 7, 2019; 7:00 pm, ESPN+		Old Dominion	L 59–70	14–10 (6–5)	Bartow Arena (3,276); Birmingham, AL
Feb 9, 2019; 7:00 pm, ESPN+		Charlotte	L 62–69	14–11 (6–6)	Bartow Arena (3,601); Birmingham, AL
Feb 14, 2019; 7:00 pm, CBSSN		at Marshall	W 77–68	15–11 (7–6)	Cam Henderson Center (5,521); Morgantown, WV
Feb 16, 2019; 1:00 pm, Stadium/Facebook		at Western Kentucky	W 68–60	16–11 (8–6)	E. A. Diddle Arena (6,839); Bowling Green, KY
Feb 23, 2019; 2:00 pm, Stadium		at Southern Miss	W 76–72 ^{OT}	17–11 (9–6)	Reed Green Coliseum (4,456); Hattiesburg, MS
Feb 28, 2019; 6:30 p.m., beIN		Western Kentucky	L 67–73	17–12 (9–7)	Bartow Arena (3,021); Birmingham, Al
Mar 3, 2019; 2:00 pm		at UTSA	L 70–76	17–13 (9–8)	Convocation Center (1,259); San Antonio, TX
Mar 9, 2019; 2:00 pm		Old Dominion	W 64–50	18–13 (10–8)	Bartow Arena (2,868); Birmingham, Al
Conference USA tournament
Mar 13, 2019; 6:30 pm, ESPN+	(5)	vs. (12) Middle Tennessee; First Round	W 70–61	19–13	Ford Center at The Star (2,704); Frisco, TX
Mar 14, 2019; 6:30 pm, Stadium	(5)	vs. (4) UTSA; Quarterfinals	W 85–76	20–13	Ford Center at The Star; Frisco, TX
Mar 15, 2019; 12:30 pm, CBSSN	(5)	vs. (1) Old Dominion; Semifinals	L 59–61	20–14	Ford Center at The Star; Frisco, TX
College Basketball Invitational
Mar 20, 2019*; 6:00 pm, ESPN+		at Brown; First round	L 78–83	20–15	Pizzitola Sports Center (683); Providence, RI
*Non-conference game. ^{#}Rankings from AP Poll. (#) Tournament seedings in parentheses. All times are in Central Time.
