= 2003–04 UTSA Roadrunners men's basketball team =

American college basketball season

2003–04 UTSA Roadrunners men's basketball

Southland tournament champion

NCAA tournament
- Conference: Southland Conference
- Record: 19–14 (11–5 Southland)
- Head coach: Tim Carter (9th season)
- Home arena: Convocation Center

2003–04 Southland Conference men's basketball standings
	Conf.				Overall
Team	W		L	PCT	W		L	PCT
Southeastern Louisiana	11	–	5	.688	20	–	9	.690
Texas–Arlington	11	–	5	.688	17	–	12	.586
UTSA †	11	–	5	.688	19	–	14	.576
Stephen F. Austin	10	–	6	.625	21	–	9	.700
Sam Houston State	8	–	8	.500	13	–	15	.464
Texas State	8	–	8	.500	13	–	15	.464
Northwestern State	8	–	8	.500	11	–	17	.393
Louisiana–Monroe	8	–	8	.500	12	–	19	.387
McNeese State	7	–	9	.438	11	–	16	.407
Lamar	5	–	11	.313	11	–	18	.379
Nicholls State	1	–	15	.063	6	–	21	.222
† 2004 Southland tournament winner

The 2003–04 UTSA Roadrunners men's basketball team represented the University of Texas at San Antonio in the 2003–04 college basketball season. This was head coach Tim Carter's 9th season at UTSA. They played their home games at the Convocation Center. The Roadrunners finished the season 19–14, 11–5 in Southland play to finish in a first place tie. They won the Southland tournament to advance to the NCAA tournament for the first time in five years. Playing as the No. 16 seed in the West region, UTSA was beaten by No. 1 seed Stanford in the round of 64.

== Roster ==
2003–04 UTSA Roadrunners men's basketball team
Players	Coaches
Pos. / # / Name / Height / Weight / Year / Previous school / Hometown; F / 0 / LeRoy Hurd / 6 ft 7 in (2.01 m) / 215 lb (98 kg) / Sr / / Moss Point, Mississippi	Head coach: Tim Carter; Assistant coach(es) Legend: (C) Team captain; (S) Suspended; (I) Ineligible; (W) Walk-on; Injured; Current redshirt

== Schedule and results ==
- All times are Central

Date time, TV	Rank^{#}	Opponent^{#}	Result	Record	Site (attendance) city, state
Non-conference Regular season
Nov 29, 2003*		Illinois-Chicago	L 47–73	1–3	Convocation Center; San Antonio, Texas
Dec 3, 2003*		at No. 25 Oklahoma State	L 53–83	1–4	Gallagher-Iba Arena; Stillwater, Oklahoma
Southland Regular season
Southland tournament
Mar 8, 2004*		Texas State; Quarterfinals	W 78–73	17–13	Convocation Center; San Antonio, Texas
Mar 10, 2004*		at Southeastern Louisiana; Semifinals	W 87–85	18–13	University Center (2,572); Hammond, Louisiana
Mar 12, 2004*		Stephen F. Austin; Championship game	W 74–70	19–13	Convocation Center (3,257); San Antonio, Texas
NCAA tournament
Mar 18, 2004*	(16 W)	vs. (1 W) No. 1 Stanford; First round	L 45–71	19–14	KeyArena (15,512); Seattle, Washington
*Non-conference game. ^{#}Rankings from AP poll. (#) Tournament seedings in parentheses. W=West.

== Awards and honors ==
- LeRoy Hurd – Southland Player of the Year
