= 2011 Southland Conference men's basketball tournament =

- Classification: Division I
- Season: 2010–11
- Teams: 8
- Site: Merrell Center; Katy, Texas
- Champions: UTSA (3rd title)
- Winning coach: Brooks Thompson (1st title)
- MVP: Devin Gibson (UTSA)
- Television: ESPN2

2010–11 Southland Conference men's basketball standings
	Conf.				Overall
Team	W		L	PCT	W		L	PCT
East
McNeese State	11	–	5	.688	21	–	12	.636
Northwestern State	10	–	6	.625	18	–	14	.563
Southeastern Louisiana	9	–	7	.563	15	–	14	.517
Nicholls State	8	–	8	.500	14	–	14	.500
Lamar	7	–	9	.438	13	–	17	.433
Central Arkansas	1	–	15	.063	5	–	24	.172
West
Sam Houston State	10	–	6	.625	18	–	13	.581
Texas State	10	–	6	.625	16	–	16	.500
Stephen F. Austin	9	–	7	.563	18	–	11	.621
UTSA †	9	–	7	.563	20	–	14	.588
Texas–Arlington	7	–	9	.438	13	–	16	.448
Texas A&M–Corpus Christi	5	–	11	.313	10	–	21	.323
† 2011 Southland tournament winner As of March 14, 2011; Rankings from AP poll

The 2011 Southland Conference men's basketball tournament, a part of the 2010–11 NCAA Division I men's basketball season, took place March 9, 10 and 12, 2011 at the Merrell Center in Katy, Texas. In the championship game, the UTSA Roadrunners beat McNeese State to win its third Southland Conference title. UTSA also received the Southland Conference's automatic bid to the 2011 NCAA Tournament, where it beat Alabama State in the First Four before losing to Ohio State in the tournament's second round.

== Format ==
The top eight teams, regardless of divisional standing, received a berth in the conference tournament. The championship game was broadcast nationally on ESPN2.

== Bracket ==
Quarterfinals; Wednesday, March 9
1	McNeese State	61
8	Nicholls State	54
4	Texas State	72
5	Southeastern Louisiana	68
2	Northwestern State	96
7	UTSA	97
3	Sam Houston State	61
6	Stephen F. Austin	45

Semifinals; Thursday, March 10
1	McNeese State	91
4	Texas State	83
7	UTSA	79
3	Sam Houston State	70

Finals; Saturday, March 12
1	McNeese State	72
7	UTSA	75
