= Mingo, West Virginia =

- Unincorporated community
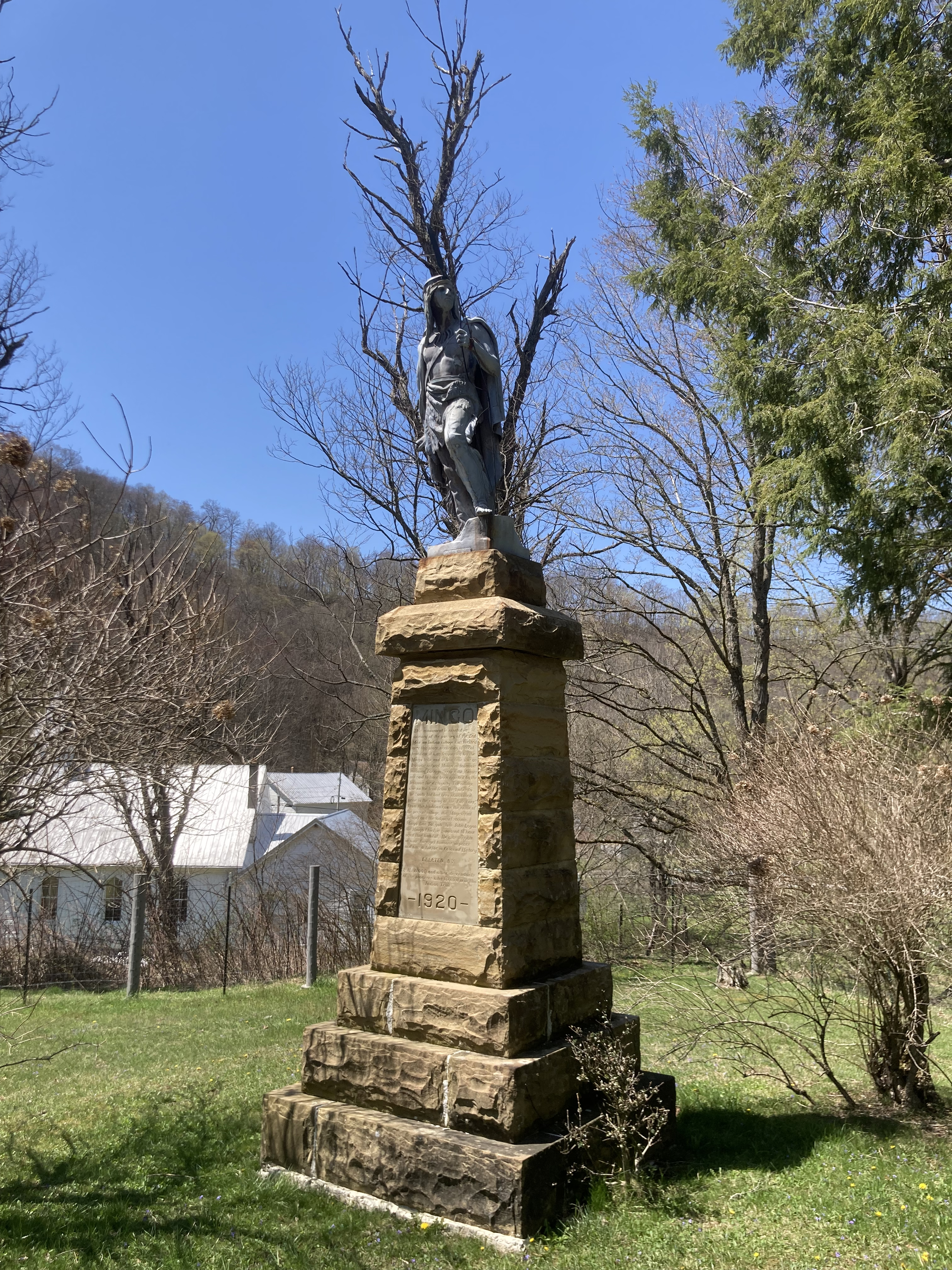
- 1920 monument to Mingo people along Mingo Flats Road

- Location within West Virginia Location within the United States
- Coordinates: 38°29′55″N 80°03′15″W
- Country: United States
- State: West Virginia
- County: Randolph
- Elevation: 2,644 ft (806 m)
- Time zone: UTC-5 (Eastern (EST))
  - Summer (DST): UTC-4 (EDT)
- Area codes: 304 & 681
- GNIS feature ID: 1552161

Mingo — sometimes known as Mingo Flats — is an unincorporated community in Randolph County, West Virginia, United States. It is located on U.S. Route 219, 15.5 miles (24.9 km) south-southwest of Huttonsville. It is named for the historic Iroquoian Mingo people.
