= 1998–99 UTSA Roadrunners men's basketball team =

American college basketball season

1998–99 UTSA Roadrunners men's basketball

Southland tournament champion

NCAA tournament
- Conference: Southland Conference
- Record: 18–11 (12–6 Southland)
- Head coach: Tim Carter (4th season)
- Home arena: Convocation Center

1998–99 Southland Conference men's basketball standings
	Conf.				Overall
Team	W		L	PCT	W		L	PCT
Southwest Texas State	13	–	5	.722	19	–	9	.679
UTSA †	12	–	6	.667	18	–	11	.621
Nicholls State	12	–	6	.667	14	–	15	.483
Northeast Louisiana	12	–	6	.667	13	–	14	.481
Lamar	11	–	7	.611	17	–	11	.607
McNeese State	11	–	7	.611	13	–	15	.464
Northwestern State	8	–	10	.444	11	–	15	.423
Texas–Arlington	8	–	10	.444	10	–	16	.385
Sam Houston State	7	–	11	.389	10	–	16	.385
Southeastern Louisiana	3	–	15	.167	6	–	20	.231
Stephen F. Austin	2	–	16	.111	4	–	22	.154
† 1999 Southland tournament winner

The 1998–99 UTSA Roadrunners men's basketball team represented the University of Texas at San Antonio in the 1998–99 college basketball season. This was head coach Tim Carter's fourth season at UTSA. They played their home games at the Convocation Center. The Roadrunners finished the season 18–11, 12–6 in TAAC play to finish in a second place tie. They won the Southland tournament to advance to the NCAA tournament for the first time in 11 years. Playing as the No. 16 seed in the West region, UTSA was beaten by No. 1 seed and eventual National champion UConn in the round of 64.

== Roster ==
1998–99 UTSA Roadrunners men's basketball team
Players	Coaches
Pos. / # / Name / Height / Weight / Year / Previous school / Hometown; F / / Devin Brown / 6 ft 5 in (1.96 m) / 195 lb (88 kg) / Fr / South San Antonio West / San Antonio, Texas	Head coach: Tim Carter; Assistant coach(es) Legend: (C) Team captain; (S) Suspended; (I) Ineligible; (W) Walk-on; Injured; Current redshirt

== Schedule and results ==
- All times are Central

Date time, TV	Rank^{#}	Opponent^{#}	Result	Record	Site (attendance) city, state
Non-conference Regular season
Nov 15, 1998*		Ouachita Baptist	W 79–48	1–0	Convocation Center; San Antonio, Texas
Nov 19, 1998*		at Texas Tech	L 78–87	1–1	Lubbock Municipal Coliseum; Lubbock, Texas
Nov 22, 1998*		Texas College	W 91–78	2–1	Convocation Center; San Antonio, Texas
Nov 24, 1998*		at Tulsa	L 68–81	2–2	Donald W. Reynolds Center; Tulsa, Oklahoma
Nov 28, 1998*		Troy	W 83–72	3–2	Convocation Center; San Antonio, Texas
Dec 1, 1998*		at UTEP	L 61–78	3–3	Don Haskins Center; El Paso, Texas
Dec 5, 1998*		at Wichita State	L 73–82	3–4	Levitt Arena; Wichita, Kansas
Dec 16, 1998*		at UMKC	W 85–83	4–4	Municipal Auditorium; Kansas City, Missouri
Southland Regular season
Dec 30, 1998		Louisiana-Monroe	L 82–91	4–5 (0–1)	Convocation Center; San Antonio, Texas
Feb 27, 1999		Texas State	L 77–91	16–10 (12–6)	Convocation Center; San Antonio, Texas
Southland tournament
Mar 5, 1999*		vs. Lamar; Semifinals	W 77–63	17–10	Hirsch Memorial Coliseum; Shreveport, Louisiana
Mar 6, 1999*		vs. Texas State; Championship game	W 71–63	18–10	Hirsch Memorial Coliseum; Shreveport, Louisiana
NCAA tournament
Mar 11, 1999*; CBS	(16 W)	vs. (1 W) No. 3 Connecticut; First round	L 66–91	18–11	McNichols Sports Arena (16,237); Denver, Colorado
*Non-conference game. ^{#}Rankings from AP poll. (#) Tournament seedings in parentheses. W=West.

== Awards and honors ==
- Devin Brown – Southland Freshman of the Year
- Tim Carter – Southland Coach of the Year
