= 2018–19 UTSA Roadrunners men's basketball team =

American college basketball season

2018–19 UTSA Roadrunners men's basketball
- Conference: Conference USA
- Record: 17–15 (11–7 C-USA)
- Head coach: Steve Henson (3rd season)
- Assistant coaches: Mike Peck; Scott Thompson; Adam Hood
- Home arena: Convocation Center

2018–19 Conference USA men's basketball standings
	Conf.				Overall
Team	W		L	PCT	W		L	PCT
Old Dominion †	13	–	5	.722	26	–	9	.743
Western Kentucky	11	–	7	.611	20	–	14	.588
Southern Miss	11	–	7	.611	20	–	13	.606
UTSA	11	–	7	.611	17	–	15	.531
UAB	10	–	8	.556	20	–	15	.571
Marshall	11	–	7	.611	23	–	14	.622
FIU	10	–	8	.556	20	–	13	.606
Louisiana Tech	9	–	9	.500	20	–	13	.606
Florida Atlantic	8	–	10	.444	17	–	16	.515
North Texas	8	–	10	.444	21	–	12	.636
Rice	8	–	10	.444	13	–	19	.406
Middle Tennessee	8	–	10	.444	11	–	21	.344
Charlotte	5	–	13	.278	8	–	21	.276
UTEP	3	–	15	.167	8	–	21	.276
† 2019 C-USA tournament winner

The 2018–19 UTSA Roadrunners men's basketball team represented the University of Texas at San Antonio during the 2018–19 NCAA Division I men's basketball season. The Roadrunners, led by third-year head coach Steve Henson, played their home games at the Convocation Center as members of Conference USA.

== Previous season ==
The Roadrunners finished the 2017–18 season 20–15, 11–7 in C-USA play to finish in fifth place. They defeated UTEP in the first round of the C-USA tournament before losing in the quarterfinals to Marshall. They were invited to the CollegeInsider.com Tournament where they defeated Lamar in the first round and received a second round bye before losing in the quarterfinals to Sam Houston State.

== Offseason ==
=== Departures ===
Name	Number	Pos.	Height	Weight	Year	Hometown	Reason for departure
Deon Lyle	1	G	6'5"	190	Junior	Hastings, NE	Signed to play professionally by Chicago Ballers
Kyle Massie	4	G	5'10"	160	Junior	Helotes, TX	Walk-on; left the team for personal reasons
Austin Karrer	11	G	6'4"	190	Senior	New Braunfels, TX	Graduated
Dante Buford	21	F	6'7"	220	RS Junior	Jacksonville, FL	Dismissed from the team
Kendall Ramlal	31	F	6'8"	225	RS Senior	Houston, TX	Walk-on; graduated
James Ringholt	32	C	6'10"	230	Senior	Rockhampton, Australia	Graduated
George Willborn III	35	G	6'3"	195	Sophomore	Chicago, IL	Transferred to UC Riverside

=== Incoming transfers ===
Name	Number	Pos.	Height	Weight	Year	Hometown	Previous School
Knox Hellums	21	G	6'5"	195	Junior	Tomball, TX	Transferred from Pepperdine. Under NCAA transfer rules, Hellums will sit out the 2018–19 season. Will have two years of remaining eligibility.
Atem Bior	23	F	6'7"		Junior	Brisbane, Australia	Junior college transferred from New Mexico Military Institute

=== Class of 2018 recruits ===
College recruiting information
Name	Hometown	School	Height	Weight	Commit date
Tamir Bynum; PG	Houston, TX	Lamar High School	5 ft 11 in (1.80 m)	155 lb (70 kg)	Jul 26, 2016
Tamir Bynum; PG	Recruit ratings: Scout: Rivals: (NR)				
Adokiye Iyaye; SG	Oklahoma City, OK	Putnam City North High School	6 ft 3 in (1.91 m)	165 lb (75 kg)	Jun 26, 2017
Adokiye Iyaye; SG	Recruit ratings: Scout: Rivals: (NR)				
Overall recruit ranking:
Note: In many cases, Scout, Rivals, 247Sports, On3, and ESPN may conflict in their listings of height and weight.; In these cases, the average was taken. ESPN grades are on a 100-point scale.; Sources: "2018 Team Ranking". Rivals.

=== Class of 2019 recruits ===
College recruiting information (2019)
Name	Hometown	School	Height	Weight	Commit date
Jacob Germany #23 C	Kingston, OK	Kingston High School	6 ft 9 in (2.06 m)	210 lb (95 kg)	Sep 8, 2018
Jacob Germany #23 C	Recruit ratings: Scout: Rivals: (80)				
Darian Gibson; PG	Houston, TX	Spring Woods High School	6 ft 3 in (1.91 m)	165 lb (75 kg)	Sep 18, 2016
Darian Gibson; PG	Recruit ratings: Scout: Rivals: (NR)				
Le'Jon Doss; SF	Fort Worth, TX	Nolan Catholic High School	6 ft 6 in (1.98 m)	215 lb (98 kg)	Aug 6, 2018
Le'Jon Doss; SF	Recruit ratings: Scout: Rivals: (NR)				
A.J. Ford; PF	Saint Petersburg, FL	Mississippi Gulf Coast CC	6 ft 8 in (2.03 m)	210 lb (95 kg)	Sep 18, 2018
A.J. Ford; PF	Recruit ratings: Scout: Rivals: (NR)				
Overall recruit ranking:
Note: In many cases, Scout, Rivals, 247Sports, On3, and ESPN may conflict in their listings of height and weight.; In these cases, the average was taken. ESPN grades are on a 100-point scale.; Sources: "2019 Team Ranking". Rivals.

== Roster ==
2018–19 UTSA Roadrunners men's basketball team
Players
Coaches

Pos.	#	Name	Height	Weight	Year	Previous school	Hometown
G	1	Christian Plummer (W)	6 ft 2 in (1.88 m)	175 lb (79 kg)	So	Coppell HS	Coppell, TX
G	2	Jhivvan Jackson	6 ft 0 in (1.83 m)	160 lb (73 kg)	So	Trinity HS	Bayamón, PR
G	3	Byron Frohnen	6 ft 6 in (1.98 m)	215 lb (98 kg)	Jr	Bishop Gorman HS	Las Vegas, NV
G	4	Tamir Bynum	6 ft 0 in (1.83 m)	170 lb (77 kg)	Fr	Lamar HS	Houston, TX
G	5	Giovanni De Nicolao	6 ft 3 in (1.91 m)	175 lb (79 kg)	Jr	I.I.S.I. Newton School	Camposampiero, Italy
F	10	Mitar Stanojević	6 ft 7 in (2.01 m)	200 lb (91 kg)	Jr	Creating Young Minds Academy	Belgrade, Serbia
G	11	Adokiye Iyaye	6 ft 3 in (1.91 m)	185 lb (84 kg)	Fr	Putnam City HS	Oklahoma City, OK
F	13	Mateo Escheik (W)	6 ft 6 in (1.98 m)	205 lb (93 kg)	Fr	Prestonwood Christian Academy	Plano, TX
F	15	Adrian Rodriguez	6 ft 7 in (2.01 m)	235 lb (107 kg)	RS Fr	Union HS	Tulsa, OK
G	21	Knox Hellums (redshirt)	6 ft 5 in (1.96 m)	195 lb (88 kg)	Jr	Concordia Lutheran HS; Pepperdine	Tomball, TX
G	22	Keaton Wallace	6 ft 3 in (1.91 m)	170 lb (77 kg)	So	Richardson HS	Dallas, TX
F	23	Atem Bior	6 ft 7 in (2.01 m)	235 lb (107 kg)	Jr	St. James College; New Mexico Military Institute	Brisbane, Australia
F	25	Nick Allen	6 ft 8 in (2.03 m)	215 lb (98 kg)	Sr	Willow Canyon HS	Surprise, AZ
F	32	Austin Timperman (W)	6 ft 9 in (2.06 m)	175 lb (79 kg)	Fr	The Woodlands HS	The Woodlands, TX
F	41	Toby Van Ry	6 ft 10 in (2.08 m)	210 lb (95 kg)	RS Sr	Fort Collins HS; Northwest Technical College	Fort Collins, CO

Head coach

- Steve Henson (Kansas State)

Assistant coach(es)

- Mike Peck (Northwood)
- Scott Thompson (Mississippi)
- Adam Hood (Air Force)

Legend

- (C) Team captain
- (S) Suspended
- (I) Ineligible
- (W) Walk-on
- Injured
- Current redshirt

Roster

== Schedule and results ==
Date time, TV	Rank^{#}	Opponent^{#}	Result	Record	Site (attendance) city, state
Non-conference regular season
Nov 7, 2018*; 7:00 pm		St. Edward's; Gulf Coast Showcase campus site game	L 76–77	0–1	Convocation Center (1,006); San Antonio, TX
Nov 12, 2018*; 7:00 pm, CBSSN		Oklahoma	L 67–87	0–2	Convocation Center (2,494); San Antonio, TX
Nov 14, 2018*; 7:00 pm, FSOK		at Oklahoma State	L 60–82	0–3	Gallagher-Iba Arena (6,571); Stillwater, OK
Nov 19, 2018*; 12:30 pm		vs. UC Irvine; Gulf Coast Showcase Quarterfinals	L 56–65	0–4	Hertz Arena (338); Estero, FL
Nov 20, 2018*; 10:00 am		vs. South Dakota State; Gulf Coast Showcase	L 79–99	0–5	Hertz Arena (487); Estero, FL
Nov 21, 2018*; 10:00 am		vs. Florida Gulf Coast; Gulf Coast Showcase	W 76–65	1–5	Hertz Arena (976); Estero, FL
Nov 26, 2018*; 7:00 pm		at Houston Baptist	W 86–82	2–5	Sharp Gymnasium (814); Houston, TX
Dec 1, 2018*; 3:00 pm		Texas State; I-35 Rivalry	L 68–69	2–6	Convocation Center (1,329); San Antonio, TX
Dec 8, 2018*; 3:00 pm		Mid-America Christian	W 104–74	3–6	Convocation Center (772); San Antonio, TX
Dec 15, 2018*; 7:00 pm		vs. Arkansas; North Little Rock Showcase	L 67–79	3–7	Verizon Arena (13,728); North Little Rock, AR
Dec 17, 2018*; 7:00 pm		Bethany	W 101–77	4–7	Convocation Center (830); San Antonio, TX
Dec 20, 2018*; 7:30 pm		at Texas A&M–Corpus Christi	W 64–50	5–7	American Bank Center (1,004); Corpus Christi, TX
Dec 29, 2018*; 3:00 pm		Southeastern Oklahoma State	W 70–67	6–7	Convocation Center (812); San Antonio, TX
Conference USA regular season
Jan 3, 2019; 7:00 pm, ESPN+		UTEP	W 75–60	7–7 (1–0)	Convocation Center (1,218); San Antonio, TX
Jan 5, 2019; 8:00 pm		at UTEP	W 67–63	8–7 (2–0)	Don Haskins Center (4,565); El Paso, TX
Jan 10, 2019; 7:00 pm, ESPN+		Rice	W 95–79	9–7 (3–0)	Convocation Center (530); San Antonio, TX
Jan 12, 2019; 3:00 pm, ESPN+		North Texas	W 76–74	10–7 (4–0)	Convocation Center (1,192); San Antonio, TX
Jan 17, 2019; 6:30 pm, ESPN+		at Middle Tennessee	L 86–89	10–8 (4–1)	Murphy Center (3,504); Murfreesboro, TN
Jan 19, 2019; 7:00 pm, ESPN+		at UAB	L 73–83	10–9 (4–2)	Bartow Arena (3,256); Birmingham, AL
Jan 24, 2019; 7:00 pm, ESPN+		Charlotte	W 88–43	11–9 (5–2)	Convocation Center (1,260); San Antonio, TX
Jan 26, 2019; 3:00 pm, ESPN+		Old Dominion	W 74–73	12–9 (6–2)	Convocation Center (1,330); San Antonio, TX
Jan 31, 2019; 7:00 pm, Facebook		at Western Kentucky	L 88–96	12–10 (6–3)	E. A. Diddle Arena; Bowling Green, KY
Feb 2, 2019; 6:00 pm, Facebook		at Marshall	W 116–106	13–10 (7–3)	Cam Henderson Center (7,182); Huntington, WV
Feb 7, 2019; 7:00 pm, ESPN+		FIU	W 100–67	14–10 (8–3)	Convocation Center (1,493); San Antonio, TX
Feb 9, 2019; 3:00 pm		Florida Atlantic	W 86–74	15–10 (9–3)	Convocation Center (2,111); San Antonio, TX
Feb 14, 2019; 7:00 pm, ESPN+		at Southern Miss	L 71–78	15–11 (9–4)	Reed Green Coliseum (2,801); Hattiesburg, MS
Feb 16, 2019; 2:00 pm, ESPN+		at Louisiana Tech	L 67–72	15–12 (9–5)	Thomas Assembly Center (3,368); Ruston, LA
Feb 28, 2019; 7:00 p.m., CBSSN		Old Dominion	L 64–65	15–13 (9–6)	Convocation Center (1,523); San Antonio, TX
Mar 3, 2019; 3:00 p.m.		UAB	W 76–70	16–13 (10–6)	Convocation Center (1,259); San Antonio, TX
Mar 6, 2019; 6:30 p.m., beIN		at Western Kentucky	W 81–76 ^{OT}	17–13 (11–6)	E. A. Diddle Arena (5,411); Bowling Green, KY
Mar 9, 2019; 5:00 p.m.		at Southern Miss	L 48–81	17–14 (11–7)	Reed Green Coliseum (4780); Hattiesburg, MS
Conference USA tournament
Mar 14, 2019; 6:30 pm	(4)	vs. (5) UAB; Quarterfinals	L 76–85	17–15	Ford Center at The Star; Frisco, TX
*Non-conference game. ^{#}Rankings from AP Poll. (#) Tournament seedings in parentheses. All times are in Central Time. Source
