= Devin Gibson (basketball) =

Basketball player

Personal information
- Born: May 21, 1989 (age 36); Houston, Texas, U.S.
- Listed height: 6 ft 0 in (1.83 m)
- Listed weight: 190 lb (86 kg)

Career information
- High school: Cypress Falls (Harris County, Texas)
- College: UTSA (2007–2011)
- NBA draft: 2011: undrafted
- Playing career: 2011–2016
- Position: Guard

Career history
- 2011–2013: Fraport Skyliners
- 2013–2014: BC Kalev
- 2014-2015: Kangoeroes Basket Willebroek
- 2015–2016: Rasta Vechta

Career highlights
- NCAA steals leader (2008); First-team All-Southland (2011); 2× Second-team All-Southland (2008, 2010); Third-team All-Southland (2009); Southland Freshman of the Year (2008); Southland tournament MVP (2011)

Devin Gibson (born May 21, 1989) is an American former professional basketball player. As a freshman in 2007–08, he led the NCAA Division I in steals per game. Gibson signed a contract with the San Antonio Spurs in 2011 but never made an official appearance in the NBA. He played college basketball with UTSA, and was designated to four conference first, second, or third teams. At the professional level, Gibson has been with Fraport Skyliners and BC Kalev/Cramo.

== See also ==
- List of NCAA Division I men's basketball season steals leaders
