= LeRoy Hurd =

American professional basketball player (born 1980)

Personal information
- Born: May 26, 1980 (age 46) Pascagoula, Mississippi, U.S.
- Listed height: 6 ft 8 in (2.03 m)
- Listed weight: 235.4 lb (107 kg)

Career information
- High school: Moss Point (Moss Point, Mississippi)
- College: Miami (Florida) (1999–2001); UTSA (2002–2004)
- NBA draft: 2004: undrafted
- Playing career: 2004–2015
- Position: Small forward / shooting guard

Career history
- 2004–2005: Columbus Riverdragons
- 2005–2006: Sutor Montegranaro
- 2006–2007: Teramo Basket
- 2007–2008: NSB Rieti
- 2008–2009: Scavolini Pesaro
- 2009–2010: Virtus Bologna
- 2010–2011: Al Kuwait
- 2011–2012: Al Ahli Dubai
- 2012: Anibal Zahle
- 2013–2014: Al Ahli Dubai
- 2014–2015: CSU Sibiu

Career highlights
- Southland Player of the Year (2004); First-team All-Southland (2004); Second-team All-Southland (2003); Southland Newcomer of the Year (2003); Southland tournament MVP (2004)

LeRoy Hurd (born May 26, 1980) is an American former professional basketball player.

Hurd was a multi-sport star at Moss Point High School in Moss Point, Mississippi, before a five-inch growth spurt made a future in basketball possible. Hurd attended the University of Miami for two years before transferring to the University of Texas at San Antonio (UTSA). His first year at UTSA was a mediocre season for his team although Hurd was named Southland Conference newcomer of the year. In 2003–2004 Hurd was named the 2004 Southland Conference Most Valuable Player after leading the conference in scoring with 19.4 points per game. He also averaged 8.2 rebounds and helped UTSA become the Southland regular season and tournament champions, as well as an NCAA tournament appearance. Hurd was also named an honorable mention All-American by The Associated Press and recently named Southland Conference 2000's Co-Player of the Decade. Hurd went undrafted and briefly played for the Columbus Riverdragons before moving on to Sutor Basket Montegranaro, Teramo Basket, Solsonica Rieti, Scavolini Pesaro, Anibal Zahle and Virtus Bologna.

On December 12, 2014, he signed with Romanian club CSU Sibiu.

== Criminal conviction ==
In June 2016, Hurd pleaded guilty in Albemarle County, Virginia Circuit Court to two counts of using a computer to solicit a minor. The charge was based on a relationship between Hurd, then 34, and a student at a high school where Hurd was an athletics coach. Hurd was sentenced to three years in prison.
