= 2020–21 UTSA Roadrunners men's basketball team =

American college basketball season

2020–21 UTSA Roadrunners men's basketball
- Conference: Conference USA
- West Division
- Record: 15–11 (9–7 CUSA)
- Head coach: Steve Henson (5th season)
- Assistant coaches: Mike Peck; Scott Thompson; Adam Hood
- Home arena: Convocation Center

2020–21 Conference USA men's basketball standings
| | Conf. | | | | Overall |
| Team | W | | L | PCT | W | | L | PCT |
|---|---|---|---|---|---|---|---|---|
East
| Western Kentucky | 11 | – | 3 | .786 | 21 | – | 8 | .724 |
| Old Dominion | 11 | – | 5 | .688 | 15 | – | 8 | .652 |
| Marshall | 9 | – | 5 | .643 | 15 | – | 7 | .682 |
| Florida Atlantic | 7 | – | 5 | .583 | 13 | – | 10 | .565 |
| Charlotte | 5 | – | 11 | .313 | 9 | – | 15 | .375 |
| Middle Tennessee | 3 | – | 13 | .188 | 5 | – | 18 | .217 |
| FIU | 2 | – | 15 | .118 | 9 | – | 17 | .346 |
West
| Louisiana Tech | 12 | – | 4 | .750 | 24 | – | 8 | .750 |
| UAB | 13 | – | 5 | .722 | 22 | – | 7 | .759 |
| North Texas † | 9 | – | 5 | .643 | 18 | – | 10 | .643 |
| UTSA | 9 | – | 7 | .563 | 15 | – | 11 | .577 |
| UTEP | 8 | – | 8 | .500 | 12 | – | 12 | .500 |
| Rice | 6 | – | 10 | .375 | 15 | – | 13 | .536 |
| Southern Miss | 4 | – | 13 | .235 | 8 | – | 17 | .320 |
† 2021 C-USA Tournament winner

The 2020–21 UTSA Roadrunners men's basketball team represented the University of Texas at San Antonio during the 2020–21 NCAA Division I men's basketball season. The team was led by fifth-year head coach Steve Henson, and played their home games at the Convocation Center in San Antonio, Texas as members of Conference USA.

== Roster ==
2020–21 UTSA Roadrunners men's basketball team
Players
Coaches

| Pos. | # | Name | Height | Weight | Year | Previous school | Hometown |
|---|---|---|---|---|---|---|---|
| F | 0 | Cedrick Alley Jr. | 6 ft 6 in (1.98 m) | 230 lb (104 kg) | RS Jr | Houston | Houston, Texas |
| G/F | 1 | Jaja Sanni | 6 ft 4 in (1.93 m) | 175 lb (79 kg) | Fr | Clear Lake High School | Houston, Texas |
| G | 2 | Jhivvan Jackson | 6 ft 0 in (1.83 m) | 170 lb (77 kg) | Sr | Euless Trinity High School | Bayamón, Puerto Rico |
| G | 3 | Jordan Ivy-Curry | 6 ft 2 in (1.88 m) | 170 lb (77 kg) | Fr | La Marque High School | La Marque, Texas |
| G | 10 | Erik Czumbel | 6 ft 3 in (1.91 m) | 200 lb (91 kg) | So | Liceo Leonardo da Vinci | Verona, Italy |
| F | 11 | Lachlan Bofinger | 6 ft 6 in (1.98 m) | 215 lb (98 kg) | Fr | Montverde Academy | Sydney, Australia |
| F | 12 | Phoenix Ford | 6 ft 8 in (2.03 m) | 225 lb (102 kg) | RS Jr | Mississippi Gulf Coast | St. Petersburg, Florida |
| G | 13 | Artan Jabbar | 5 ft 11 in (1.8 m) | 170 lb (77 kg) | So | Dallas Baptist | Fort Worth, Texas |
| G/F | 15 | Eric Parrish | 6 ft 6 in (1.98 m) | 195 lb (88 kg) | RS Jr | Nevada | Cypress, Texas |
| G | 22 | Keaton Wallace | 6 ft 4 in (1.93 m) | 195 lb (88 kg) | Sr | Richardson High School | Dallas, Texas |
| C | 24 | Jacob Germany | 6 ft 11 in (2.11 m) | 235 lb (107 kg) | So | Kingston High School | Kingston, Oklahoma |
| F | 25 | Adrian Rodriguez | 6 ft 7 in (2.01 m) | 245 lb (111 kg) | RS Jr | Union High School | Tulsa, Oklahoma |
| G | 32 | Isaiah Addo-Ankrah | 6 ft 6 in (1.98 m) | 180 lb (82 kg) | Fr | Second Baptist School | Houston, Texas |

Head coach

- Steve Henson (Kansas State)

Assistant coach(es)

- Mike Peck (Northwood)
- Scott Thompson (Mississippi)
- Adam Hood (Air Force)

Legend

- (C) Team captain
- (S) Suspended
- (I) Ineligible
- (W) Walk-on
- Injured
- Current redshirt

Roster
Last update: May 14, 2021

== Schedule and results ==
| Date time, TV | Rank^{#} | Opponent^{#} | Result | Record | Site (attendance) city, state |
Non-conference regular season
| November 25, 2020*; 7:00 p.m. | | at Oklahoma | Postponed (Note: Game was postponed due to COVID-19 pandemic related issues.) | | Lloyd Noble Center; Norman, OK |
| November 27, 2020*; 3:00 p.m. | | UT Permian Basin | W 87–71 | 1–0 | Convocation Center (425); San Antonio, TX |
| November 28, 2020*; 3:00 p.m. | | at UTRGV | L 64–81 | 1–1 | UTRGV Fieldhouse; Edinburg, TX |
| December 3, 2020*; 7:00 p.m. | | at Oklahoma | L 66–105 | 1–2 | Lloyd Noble Center (2,021); Norman, OK |
| December 4, 2020*; 6:00 p.m. | | Sul Ross | W 91–62 | 2–2 | Convocation Center (410); San Antonio, TX |
| December 16, 2020*; 4:00 p.m. | | at Oregon State | L 61–73 | 2–3 | Gill Coliseum; Corvallis, OR |
| December 20, 2020*; 3:00 p.m. | | Our Lady of the Lake | W 102–70 | 3–3 | Convocation Center (402); San Antonio, TX |
| December 22, 2020*; 6:00 p.m. | | Lamar | W 88–66 | 4–3 | Convocation Center (334); San Antonio, TX |
CUSA regular season
| January 1, 2021; 2:00 p.m. | | at Rice | L 86–95 | 4–4 (0–1) | Tudor Fieldhouse; Houston, TX |
| January 2, 2021; 2:00 p.m. | | at Rice | L 69–84 | 4–5 (0–2) | Tudor Fieldhouse; Houston, TX |
| January 8, 2021; 6:00 p.m. | | North Texas | L 70–77 | 4–6 (0–3) | Convocation Center (388); San Antonio, TX |
| January 9, 2021; 3:00 p.m. | | North Texas | W 77–69 | 5–6 (1–3) | Convocation Center (389); San Antonio, TX |
| January 15, 2021; 6:30 p.m. | | at Louisiana Tech | L 66–77 | 5–7 (1–4) | Thomas Assembly Center (1,200); Ruston, LA |
| January 16, 2021; 6:00 p.m. | | at Louisiana Tech | L 66–82 | 5–8 (1–5) | Thomas Assembly Center (1,200); Ruston, LA |
| January 22, 2021; 6:00 p.m. | | Southern Miss | W 70–64 | 6–8 (2–5) | Convocation Center; San Antonio, TX |
| January 23, 2021; 3:00 p.m. | | Southern Miss | W 78–72 | 7–8 (3–5) | Convocation Center (362); San Antonio, TX |
| January 28, 2021; 6:00 p.m. | | UTEP | W 86–79 | 8–8 (4–5) | Convocation Center (470); San Antonio, TX |
| January 30, 2021; 8:00 p.m. | | at UTEP | L 51–69 | 8–9 (4–6) | Don Haskins Center (540); El Paso, TX |
| February 5, 2021; 6:00 p.m. | | at FIU | W 87–80 | 9–9 (5–6) | Ocean Bank Convocation Center (194); Miami, FL |
| February 6, 2021; 2:00 p.m. | | at FIU | W 90–47 | 10–9 (6–6) | Ocean Bank Convocation Center (147); Miami, FL |
| February 12, 2021; 6:00 p.m. | | Florida Atlantic | W 84–80 | 11–9 (7–6) | Convocation Center (373); San Antonio, TX |
| February 13, 2021; 3:00 p.m. | | Florida Atlantic | W 86–75 | 12–9 (8–6) | Convocation Center (384); San Antonio, TX |
| February 19, 2021 | | at Charlotte | Postponed (Note: Game was postponed due to weather concerns.) | | Dale F. Halton Arena; Charlotte, NC |
| February 20, 2021 | | at Charlotte | Postponed | | Dale F. Halton Arena; Charlotte, NC |
| February 26, 2021; 6:00 p.m. | | UAB | L 57–64 | 12–10 (8–7) | Convocation Center (429); San Antonio, TX |
| February 27, 2021; 3:00 p.m. | | UAB | W 96–79 | 13–10 (9–7) | Convocation Center (394); San Antonio, TX |
| March 4, 2021*; 6:00 p.m. | | Southwestern Adventist | W 123–43 | 14–10 | Convocation Center (322); San Antonio, TX |
Conference USA tournament
| March 10, 2021; 5:30 p.m., ESPN+ | (W4) | vs. (E5) Charlotte; Second Round | W 72–62 | 15–10 | Ford Center at The Star; Frisco, TX |
| March 11, 2021; 5:30 p.m., ESPN+ | (W4) | vs. (E1) Western Kentucky; Quarterfinals | L 67–80 | 15–11 | Ford Center at The Star; Frisco, TX |
*Non-conference game. ^{#}Rankings from AP Poll. (#) Tournament seedings in parentheses. All times are in Central.

== See also ==
- 2020–21 UTSA Roadrunners women's basketball team
