= 2020–21 Marshall Thundering Herd men's basketball team =

American college basketball season

2020–21 Marshall Thundering Herd men's basketball
- Conference: Conference USA
- East Division
- Record: 15–7 (9–5 C-USA)
- Head coach: Dan D'Antoni (7th season)
- Assistant coaches: Mark Cline; Scott Rigot; Cornelius Jackson
- Home arena: Cam Henderson Center

2020–21 Conference USA men's basketball standings
	Conf.				Overall
Team	W		L	PCT	W		L	PCT
East
Western Kentucky	11	–	3	.786	21	–	8	.724
Old Dominion	11	–	5	.688	15	–	8	.652
Marshall	9	–	5	.643	15	–	7	.682
Florida Atlantic	7	–	5	.583	13	–	10	.565
Charlotte	5	–	11	.313	9	–	15	.375
Middle Tennessee	3	–	13	.188	5	–	18	.217
FIU	2	–	15	.118	9	–	17	.346
West
Louisiana Tech	12	–	4	.750	24	–	8	.750
UAB	13	–	5	.722	22	–	7	.759
North Texas †	9	–	5	.643	18	–	10	.643
UTSA	9	–	7	.563	15	–	11	.577
UTEP	8	–	8	.500	12	–	12	.500
Rice	6	–	10	.375	15	–	13	.536
Southern Miss	4	–	13	.235	8	–	17	.320
† 2021 C-USA Tournament winner

The 2020–21 Marshall Thundering Herd men's basketball team represented Marshall University during the 2020–21 NCAA Division I men's basketball season. The Thundering Herd, led by seventh-year head coach Dan D'Antoni, played their home games at the Cam Henderson Center as members of the East Division of Conference USA. They finished the season 15–7, 9–5 in C-USA play to finish in third place in the East Division. They were defeated in the second round of the C-USA tournament by Rice.

== Previous season ==
The Thundering Herd finished the 2019–20 season 17–15, 10–8 in C-USA play to finish in sixth place. They defeated UTEP in the opening round of the C-USA tournament, and they were scheduled to play Louisiana Tech in the quarterfinals. However, the remainder of the tournament was canceled due to the coronavirus pandemic.

== Offseason ==
=== Departures ===
Name	Number	Pos.	Height	Weight	Year	Hometown	Notes
Cam Brooks-Harris	24	F	6'6"	175	RS Freshman	Zanesville, Ohio	Transferred to Tallahassee Community College
Dajour Rucker	32	F	6'7"	250	Freshman	Virginia Beach, Virginia	Left team for personal reasons
Robby Williams	14	G	5'10"	150	Freshman	Charleston, West Virginia	Walk-on; transferred to Coastal Alabama Community College

=== 2020 recruiting class ===
College recruiting information
Name	Hometown	School	Height	Weight	Commit date
Obinna Anochili-Killen; SF/PF	Chapmanville, West Virginia	Chapmanville High School	6 ft 8 in (2.03 m)	200 lb (91 kg)	Sep 19, 2019
Obinna Anochili-Killen; SF/PF	Recruit ratings: Rivals: 247Sports: ESPN: (78)				
David Early; SG	Logan, West Virginia	Logan High School	6 ft 4 in (1.93 m)	240 lb (110 kg)	Jan 29, 2020
David Early; SG	Recruit ratings: Rivals: 247Sports: (NR)				
Overall recruit ranking: Rivals: NR 247Sports: 99th ESPN: NR
Note: In many cases, Scout, Rivals, 247Sports, On3, and ESPN may conflict in their listings of height and weight.; In these cases, the average was taken. ESPN grades are on a 100-point scale.; Sources: "Marshall Basketball Commitment List". Rivals.; "ESPN". ESPN.; "2020 Team Ranking". Rivals.

== Roster ==
2020–21 Marshall Thundering Herd men's basketball team
Players
Coaches

Pos.	#	Name	Height	Weight	Year	Previous school	Hometown
G	0	Andrew Taylor	6 ft 3 in (1.91 m)	188 lb (85 kg)	RS So	Corbin	Corbin, Kentucky
G/F	1	C. J. Meredith (W)	6 ft 6 in (1.98 m)	200 lb (91 kg)	Fr	Spring Valley	Huntington, West Virginia
F	2	Iran Bennett (injured)	6 ft 9 in (2.06 m)	335 lb (152 kg)	RS Jr	Hargrave	Durham, North Carolina
F	3	Jannson Williams	6 ft 9 in (2.06 m)	219 lb (99 kg)	RS Sr	Newnan	Newnan, Georgia
G	4	Ty Sturm (W)	6 ft 2 in (1.88 m)	170 lb (77 kg)	RS Fr	Cabell Midland	Hurricane, West Virginia
G/F	5	Jeremy Dillon	6 ft 5 in (1.96 m)	193 lb (88 kg)	RS So	Mingo Central	Mingo, West Virginia
G	11	Luke Thomas	6 ft 0 in (1.83 m)	177 lb (80 kg)	Jr	Fairland	Proctorville, Ohio
G	13	Jarrod West	5 ft 11 in (1.8 m)	181 lb (82 kg)	Sr	Notre Dame HS	Clarksburg, West Virginia
G/F	15	Marko Sarenac	6 ft 7 in (2.01 m)	198 lb (90 kg)	So	Hoosac	Ljubovija, Serbia
F	21	Darius George	6 ft 7 in (2.01 m)	201 lb (91 kg)	Sr	Staunton (Robert E. Lee)	Staunton, Virginia
G	23	David Early	6 ft 4 in (1.93 m)	249 lb (113 kg)	Fr	Logan	Logan, West Virginia
G	24	Taevion Kinsey	6 ft 5 in (1.96 m)	185 lb (84 kg)	Jr	Eastmoor	Columbus, Ohio
F	25	Obinna Anochili-Killen	6 ft 8 in (2.03 m)	199 lb (90 kg)	Fr	Chapmanville	Lagos, Nigeria
F	31	Mikel Beyers	6 ft 9 in (2.06 m)	220 lb (100 kg)	Sr	Mesa CC	Houston, Texas
G	35	Devin Collins (W)	6 ft 8 in (2.03 m)	185 lb (84 kg)	RS Fr	Chapmanville	Chapmanville, West Virginia
C	50	Goran Miladinovic	7 ft 0 in (2.13 m)	235 lb (107 kg)	So	Hoosac	Tivat, Montenegro

Head coach

- Dan D'Antoni (Marshall)

Assistant coach(es)

- Mark Cline (Wake Forest)
- Scott Rigot (Buffalo)
- Cornelius Jackson (Marshall)

Legend

- (C) Team captain
- (S) Suspended
- (I) Ineligible
- (W) Walk-on
- Injured
- Current redshirt

Roster
Last update: 11/22/2020

== Schedule and results ==
Date time, TV	Rank^{#}	Opponent^{#}	Result	Record	High points	High rebounds	High assists	Site (attendance) city, state
Non-conference regular season
Nov 25, 2020*; 6:00 pm, CUSA.tv		Coppin State	Canceled					Cam Henderson Center; Huntington, WV
Nov 27, 2020*; 4:00 pm, CUSA.tv		Arkansas State	W 70–56	1–0	17 – Kinsey	7 – Kinsey	8 – West	Cam Henderson Center (1,251); Huntington, WV
Dec 3, 2020*; 7:00 pm, ESPN+		at Wright State	W 80–64	2–0	31 – Kinsey	8 – George	9 – West	Nutter Center (50); Fairborn, OH
Dec 5, 2020*; TBA		at Akron	Postponed					James A. Rhodes Arena; Akron, OH
Dec 9, 2020*; 7:00 pm, FloSports		at College of Charleston	W 84–72	3–0	19 – Tied	8 – George	9 – Kinsey	TD Arena (1,419); Charleston, SC
Dec 13, 2020*; 2:00 pm, CUSA.tv		Ohio	W 81–67	4–0	28 – Kinsey	10 – Taylor	6 – West	Cam Henderson Center (1,272); Huntington, WV
Dec 16, 2020*; 6:00 pm, CUSA.tv		Toledo	L 87–96 ^{OT}	4–1	20 – Kinsey	8 – Taylor	6 – Tied	Cam Henderson Center (1,222); Huntington, WV
Dec 19, 2020*; 2:00 pm, Stadium		Northern Iowa	Canceled					Cam Henderson Center; Huntington, WV
Dec 20, 2020*; 2:00 pm, CUSA.tv		Robert Morris	W 85–71	5–1	24 – Williams	9 – West	8 – West	Cam Henderson Center (1,230); Huntington, WV
Dec 22, 2020*; 6:00 pm, CUSA.tv		UNC Asheville	W 88–67	6–1	26 – Kinsey	8 – Taylor	9 – West	Cam Henderson Center (1,244); Huntington, WV
Conference USA regular season
Jan 1, 2021; 7:30 pm, ESPN+		at Louisiana Tech	L 68–75	6–2 (0–1)	21 – Kinsey	6 – Tied	6 – Tied	Thomas Assembly Center (1,200); Ruston, LA
Jan 2, 2021; 7:00 pm, ESPN+		at Louisiana Tech	W 80–73	7–2 (1–1)	20 – Kinsey	10 – Taylor	9 – Taylor	Thomas Assembly Center (1,200); Ruston, LA
Jan 8, 2021; 6:00 pm, Stadium		Charlotte	Postponed					Cam Henderson Center; Huntington, WV
Jan 9, 2021; 4:00 pm, Stadium		Charlotte	Postponed					Cam Henderson Center; Huntington, WV
Jan 15, 2021; 5:00 pm, CBSSN		at Western Kentucky	L 73–81	7–3 (1–2)	19 – Williams	7 – Taylor	9 – Taylor	E. A. Diddle Arena (1,117); Bowling Green, KY
Jan 17, 2021; 2:00 pm, CBSSN		Western Kentucky	L 67–69	7–4 (1–3)	17 – Taylor	12 – Kinsey	5 – West	Cam Henderson Center (1,274); Huntington, WV
Jan 22, 2021; 7:00 pm		at FIU	W 79–66	8–4 (2–3)	16 – Tied	10 – Taylor	6 – West	Ocean Bank Convocation Center (308); Miami, FL
Jan 23, 2021; 2:00 pm, Stadium		at FIU	W 89–72	9–4 (3–3)	22 – Kinsey	12 – Kinsey	3 – Tied	Ocean Bank Convocation Center (128); Miami, FL
Jan 29, 2021; 6:00 pm, Stadium		Florida Atlantic	Postponed					Cam Henderson Center; Huntington, WV
Jan 30, 2021; 4:00 pm, Stadium		Florida Atlantic	Postponed					Cam Henderson Center; Huntington, WV
Feb 5, 2021; 7:00 pm, ESPN+		at Old Dominion	L 81–82	9–5 (3–4)	22 – Kinsey	6 – Williams	10 – West	Chartway Arena (250); Norfolk, VA
Feb 6, 2021; 7:00 pm, ESPN+		at Old Dominion	W 87–67	10–5 (4–4)	18 – Tied	8 – Miladinovic	8 – Taylor	Chartway Arena (250); Norfolk, VA
Feb 12, 2021; 6:00 pm, ESPN+		Middle Tennessee	W 107–79	11–5 (5–4)	25 – Kinsey	7 – Williams	8 – Tied	Cam Henderson Center (1,083); Huntington, WV
Feb 13, 2021; 4:00 pm, ESPN+		Middle Tennessee	W 96–85	12–5 (6–4)	29 – West	5 – Kinsey	9 – Taylor	Cam Henderson Center (1,136); Huntington, WV
Feb 20, 2021; 1:00 pm, ESPN+		at Rice	Canceled (Note: Game was canceled due to COVID-19 pandemic related issues.)					Tudor Fieldhouse; Houston, TX
Feb 21, 2021; 12:00 pm, ESPN+		at Rice	Canceled					Tudor Fieldhouse; Houston, TX
Feb 26, 2021; 7:00 pm, ESPNU		North Texas	L 65–77	12–6 (6–5)	15 – Taylor	10 – Beyers	5 – West	Cam Henderson Center (1,055); Huntington, WV
Feb 27, 2021; 2:00 pm, Stadium		North Texas	W 73–72	13–6 (7–5)	20 – Taylor	7 – Kinsey	5 – Taylor	Cam Henderson Center (1,228); Huntington, WV
March 5, 2021; 7:00 p.m., Stadium		Charlotte	W 75–67	14–6 (8–5)	19 – Kinsey	9 – Kinsey	4 – West	Cam Henderson Center (1,076); Huntington, WV
March 6, 2021; 2:00 p.m., Stadium		Charlotte	W 75–66	15–6 (9–5)	23 – Kinsey	8 – Kinsey	4 – Taylor	Cam Henderson Center (1,145); Huntington, WV
Conference USA tournament
March 10, 2021; 7:00 p.m., ESPN+	(E3)	vs. (W6) Rice; Second Round	L 68–72	15–7	19 – West	8 – Beyers	7 – West	Ford Center at The Star; Frisco, TX
*Non-conference game. ^{#}Rankings from AP Poll. (#) Tournament seedings in parentheses. All times are in Eastern Time.
