= 2020–21 Rice Owls men's basketball team =

American college basketball season

2020–21 Rice Owls men's basketball
- Conference: Conference USA
- West Division
- Record: 15–13 (6–10 CUSA)
- Head coach: Scott Pera (4th season)
- Assistant coaches: Vince Alexander; Van Green; Derek Glasser
- Home arena: Tudor Fieldhouse

2020–21 Conference USA men's basketball standings
	Conf.				Overall
Team	W		L	PCT	W		L	PCT
East
Western Kentucky	11	–	3	.786	21	–	8	.724
Old Dominion	11	–	5	.688	15	–	8	.652
Marshall	9	–	5	.643	15	–	7	.682
Florida Atlantic	7	–	5	.583	13	–	10	.565
Charlotte	5	–	11	.313	9	–	15	.375
Middle Tennessee	3	–	13	.188	5	–	18	.217
FIU	2	–	15	.118	9	–	17	.346
West
Louisiana Tech	12	–	4	.750	24	–	8	.750
UAB	13	–	5	.722	22	–	7	.759
North Texas †	9	–	5	.643	18	–	10	.643
UTSA	9	–	7	.563	15	–	11	.577
UTEP	8	–	8	.500	12	–	12	.500
Rice	6	–	10	.375	15	–	13	.536
Southern Miss	4	–	13	.235	8	–	17	.320
† 2021 C-USA Tournament winner

The 2020–21 Rice Owls men's basketball team represented the Rice University during the 2020–21 NCAA Division I men's basketball season. The team was led by fourth-year head coach Scott Pera, and played their home games at Tudor Fieldhouse in Houston, Texas as members of Conference USA.

== Previous season ==
The Owls finished the 2019–20 season 15–17, 7–11 in C-USA play to finish in 12th place. They lost in the first round of the C-USA tournament to FIU.

== Roster ==
2020–21 Rice Owls men's basketball team
Players
Coaches

Pos.	#	Name	Height	Weight	Year	Previous school	Hometown
G	0	Payton Moore	6 ft 4 in (1.93 m)	215 lb (98 kg)	Jr	Santa Monica HS	Los Angeles, CA
G	1	Noah Hutchins	6 ft 1 in (1.85 m)	195 lb (88 kg)	Fr	IMG Academy	Buffalo, NY
G	2	Jake Lieppert	6 ft 4 in (1.93 m)	200 lb (91 kg)	So	Saguaro HS; Pima CC	Scottsdale, AZ
G	3	Travis Evee	6 ft 1 in (1.85 m)	180 lb (82 kg)	So	Vermont Academy; VMI	Randolph, MA
G	4	Quincy Olivari	6 ft 3 in (1.91 m)	200 lb (91 kg)	So	Westlake HS	Atlanta, GA
G/F	5	Cameron Sheffield	6 ft 6 in (1.98 m)	200 lb (91 kg)	Fr	Chattahoochee HS	Alpharetta, GA
F	10	Malik Ondigo	6 ft 10 in (2.08 m)	215 lb (98 kg)	RS Jr	Putnam Science Academy; Texas Tech	El Mirage, AZ
F	11	Riley Abercrombie	6 ft 10 in (2.08 m)	210 lb (95 kg)	RS So	Clear Lake HS; Boise State	Wollongong, Australia
F	12	Ben Moffat (W)	6 ft 8 in (2.03 m)	225 lb (102 kg)	So	Rider HS	Wichita Falls, TX
G	14	Reed Myers (W)	6 ft 0 in (1.83 m)	180 lb (82 kg)	So	Scottsdale Christian Academy	Phoenix
F	15	Max Fiedler	6 ft 10 in (2.08 m)	235 lb (107 kg)	So	Melbourne HS	Indialantic FL
G	22	Tre Clark	6 ft 5 in (1.96 m)	205 lb (93 kg)	GS	Palmetto HS; Furman	Palmetto, FL
G	24	Chris Mullins	6 ft 3 in (1.91 m)	190 lb (86 kg)	Jr	Mansfield Timberview HS	Grand Paririe, TX
F	34	Mylyjael Poteat	6 ft 9 in (2.06 m)	260 lb (118 kg)	Fr	The Burlington School	Reidsville, NC
G	55	Cavit Ege Havsa	6 ft 5 in (1.96 m)	180 lb (82 kg)	GS	Esenyurt Okyanus HS; Utah Valley	Istanbul, Turkey

Head coach

- Scott Pera (Penn State)

Assistant coach(es)

- Vince Alexander (Oklahoma Baptist)
- Van Green (Rice)
- Derek Glasser (Arizona State)

Legend

- (C) Team captain
- (S) Suspended
- (I) Ineligible
- (W) Walk-on
- Injured
- Current redshirt

Roster
Last update: February 1, 2021

== Schedule and results ==
Date time, TV	Rank^{#}	Opponent^{#}	Result	Record	Site (attendance) city, state
Non-conference regular season
November 27, 2020*; 1:00 p.m.		at Incarnate Word; UIW Invitational	W 68–53	1–0	McDermott Center; San Antonio, TX
November 29, 2020*; 3:00 p.m.		vs. Our Lady of the Lake; UIW Invitational	W 103–64	2–0	McDermott Center; San Antonio, TX
December 3, 2020*; 2:00 p.m.		LeTourneau	W 94–74	3–0	Tudor Fieldhouse; Houston, TX
December 5, 2020*; 7:00 p.m.		at Houston Baptist	W 86–64	4–0	Sharp Gymnasium (150); Houston, TX
December 12, 2020*; 1:00 p.m.		Houston	Postponed (Note: Game was postponed due to COVID-19 pandemic related issues.)		Fertitta Center; Houston, TX
December 13, 2020*; 2:00 p.m.		New Mexico	L 61–72	4–1	Tudor Fieldhouse; Houston, TX
December 15, 2020*; 2:00 p.m.		Houston Baptist	W 90–79	5–1	Tudor Fieldhouse; Houston, TX
December 19, 2020*; 2:00 p.m.		at Sam Houston State	L 69–82	5–2	Bernard Johnson Coliseum (504); Huntsville, TX
December 21, 2020*; 2:00 p.m.		Incarnate Word	Postponed		Tudor Fieldhouse; Houston, TX
December 21, 2020*; 2:00 p.m.		New Orleans	W 73–62	6–2	Tudor Fieldhouse; Houston, TX
CUSA regular season
January 1, 2021; 2:00 p.m.		UTSA	W 95–86	7–2 (1–0)	Tudor Fieldhouse; Houston, TX
January 2, 2021; 2:00 p.m.		UTSA	W 84–69	8–2 (2–0)	Tudor Fieldhouse; Houston, TX
January 8, 2021; 8:00 p.m.		at UTEP	L 89–101	8–3 (2–1)	Don Haskins Center (459); El Paso, TX
January 9, 2021; 8:00 p.m.		at UTEP	W 71–68	9–3 (3–1)	Don Haskins Center (457); El Paso, TX
January 15, 2021; 2:00 p.m.		Old Dominion	W 69–59	10–3 (4–1)	Tudor Fieldhouse; Houston, TX
January 16, 2021; 1:00 p.m.		Old Dominion	L 58–61	10–4 (4–2)	Tudor Fieldhouse; Houston, TX
January 22, 2021; 6:30 p.m.		at UAB	L 68–78	10–5 (4-3)	Bartow Arena (1,099); Birmingham, AL
January 23, 2021; 3:00 p.m.		at UAB	L 74–86	10–6 (4–4)	Bartow Arena (989); Birmingham, AL
January 28, 2021; 7:00 p.m.		North Texas	L 74–79	10–7 (4–5)	Tudor Fieldhouse; Houston, TX
January 30, 2021; 4:00 p.m.		at North Texas	L 53–79	10–8 (4–6)	The Super Pit (1,303); Denton, TX
February 5, 2021; 7:00 p.m.		Southern Miss	W 88–62	11–8 (5–6)	Tudor Fieldhouse; Houston, TX
February 6, 2021; 4:00 p.m.		Southern Miss	W 76–68	12–8 (6–6)	Tudor Fieldhouse; Houston, TX
February 12, 2021; 7:00 p.m.		at Western Kentucky	L 71–77	12–9 (6–7)	E. A. Diddle Arena (1,118); Bowling Green, KY
February 13, 2021; 5:00 p.m.		at Western Kentucky	L 66–89	12–10 (6–8)	E. A. Diddle Arena (1,239); Bowling Green, KY
February 20, 2021; 12:00 p.m.		Marshall	Canceled (Note: Game was canceled due to COVID-19 pandemic related issues.)		Tudor Fieldhouse; Houston, TX
February 21, 2021; 11:00 a.m.		Marshall	Canceled		Tudor Fieldhouse; Houston, TX
February 26, 2021; 6:30 p.m.		at Louisiana Tech	L 57–101	12–11 (6–9)	Thomas Assembly Center (1,200); Ruston, LA
February 27, 2021; 6:00 p.m.		at Louisiana Tech	L 58–79	12–12 (6–10)	Thomas Assembly Center (1,200); Ruston, LA
March 5, 2021*; 2:00 p.m.		Our Lady of the Lake	W 80–77	13–12	Tudor Fieldhouse; Houston, TX
Conference USA tournament
March 9, 2021; 7:00 pm, ESPN+	(W6)	vs. (W7) Southern Miss; Preliminary Round	W 61–52	14–12	Ford Center at The Star (283); Frisco, TX
March 9, 2021; 7:00 pm, ESPN+	(W6)	vs. (E3) Marshall; Second Round	W 72–68	15–12	Ford Center at The Star; Frisco, TX
March 10, 2021; 7:00 pm, ESPN+	(W6)	vs. (W2) UAB; Quarterfinals	L 60–73	15–13	Ford Center at The Star; Frisco, TX
*Non-conference game. ^{#}Rankings from AP Poll. (#) Tournament seedings in parentheses. All times are in Central.

== See also ==
- 2020–21 Rice Owls women's basketball team
