= Grant McCasland =

American college basketball coach (born 1976)

Current position
- Title: Head coach
- Team: Texas Tech
- Conference: Big 12
- Record: 74–31

Biographical details
- Born: October 14, 1976 (age 50); Irving, Texas, U.S.

Playing career
- 1995–1999: Baylor
- Position: Point guard

Coaching career (HC unless noted)
- 2001–2003: Northeastern (CO) (assistant)
- 2003–2004: Midland (TX) (assistant)
- 2004–2009: Midland (TX)
- 2009–2011: Midwestern State Head Coach, 2011, Abilene Christian University
- 2011–2016: Baylor (assistant)
- 2016–2017: Arkansas State
- 2017–2023: North Texas
- 2023–present: Texas Tech

Administrative career (AD unless noted)
- 1999–2001: Texas Tech (dir. of ops.)

Head coaching record
- Overall: 284–120 (college); 142–32 (junior college)
- Tournaments: 5–4 (NCAA DI); 6–2 (NCAA DII); 6–1 (NIT); 5–1 (CBI)

Accomplishments and honors

Championships
- NJCAA Division I tournament (2007); NIT (2023); CBI (2018); C-USA tournament (2021); 2 C-USA regular season (2020, 2022)

Awards
- C-USA Coach of the Year (2020)

Grant McCasland (born October 14, 1976) is an American college basketball coach who is currently the head men's basketball coach at Texas Tech University. McCasland previously coached at North Texas from 2017 to 2023, where he guided the Mean Green to two postseason tournament championships: the 2018 College Basketball Invitational and 2023 National Invitation Tournament. He was previously an assistant at his alma mater, Baylor, and head coach at Midwestern State, Midland College, and Arkansas State.

== Personal life ==
McCasland is a Christian. He is married to Cece McCasland. They have four children.

== Head coaching record ==
=== Junior college ===
Record table
Season	Team	Overall	Conference	Standing	Postseason
Midland Chaparrals (Western Junior College Athletic Conference) (2004–2009)
2004–05	Midland	26–10			
2005–06	Midland	25–6			
2006–07	Midland	30–8			NJCAA Division I Champion
2007–08	Midland	28–4			
2008–09	Midland	33–4			NJCAA Division I Runner-up
Midland:		142–32 (.816)			
Total:		142–32 (.816)			
National champion Postseason invitational champion Conference regular season champion Conference regular season and conference tournament champion Division regular season champion Division regular season and conference tournament champion Conference tournament champion

=== College ===
Record table
Season	Team	Overall	Conference	Standing	Postseason
Midwestern State Mustangs (Lone Star Conference) (2009–2011)
2009–10	Midwestern State	30–3	10–2	1st	NCAA Division II Elite Eight
2010–11	Midwestern State	25–9	9–5	2nd	NCAA Division II Elite Eight
Midwestern State:		55–12 (.821)	25–9 (.735)		
Arkansas State Red Wolves (Sun Belt Conference) (2016–2017)
2016–17	Arkansas State	20–12	11–7	T–3rd	
Arkansas State:		20–12 (.625)	11–7 (.611)		
North Texas Mean Green (Conference USA) (2017–2023)
2017–18	North Texas	20–18	8–10	T–7th	CBI Champion
2018–19	North Texas	21–12	8–10	T–9th	
2019–20	North Texas	20–11	14–4	1st	Postseason not held
2020–21	North Texas	18–10	9–5	3rd (West)	NCAA Division I Round of 32
2021–22	North Texas	25–7	16–2	1st (West)	NIT Second Round
2022–23	North Texas	31–7	16–4	2nd	NIT Champions
North Texas:		135–65 (.675)	71–35 (.670)		
Texas Tech Red Raiders (Big 12 Conference) (2023–present)
2023–24	Texas Tech	23–11	11–7	T–3rd	NCAA Division I Round of 64
2024–25	Texas Tech	28–9	15–5	2nd	NCAA Division I Elite Eight
2025–26	Texas Tech	23–11	12–6	T–3rd	NCAA Division I Round of 32
Texas Tech:		74–31 (.705)	38–18 (.679)		
Total:		284–121 (.701)			
National champion Postseason invitational champion Conference regular season champion Conference regular season and conference tournament champion Division regular season champion Division regular season and conference tournament champion Conference tournament champion
