= 2020–21 Louisiana Tech Bulldogs basketball team =

American college basketball season

2020–21 Louisiana Tech Bulldogs basketball

Conference USA West Division champions

NIT, Third place
- Conference: Conference USA
- West Division
- Record: 24–8 (12–4 C-USA)
- Head coach: Eric Konkol (6th season)
- Assistant coaches: Duffy Conroy; Talvin Hester; Desmond Haymon
- Home arena: Thomas Assembly Center

2020–21 Conference USA men's basketball standings
	Conf.				Overall
Team	W		L	PCT	W		L	PCT
East
Western Kentucky	11	–	3	.786	21	–	8	.724
Old Dominion	11	–	5	.688	15	–	8	.652
Marshall	9	–	5	.643	15	–	7	.682
Florida Atlantic	7	–	5	.583	13	–	10	.565
Charlotte	5	–	11	.313	9	–	15	.375
Middle Tennessee	3	–	13	.188	5	–	18	.217
FIU	2	–	15	.118	9	–	17	.346
West
Louisiana Tech	12	–	4	.750	24	–	8	.750
UAB	13	–	5	.722	22	–	7	.759
North Texas †	9	–	5	.643	18	–	10	.643
UTSA	9	–	7	.563	15	–	11	.577
UTEP	8	–	8	.500	12	–	12	.500
Rice	6	–	10	.375	15	–	13	.536
Southern Miss	4	–	13	.235	8	–	17	.320
† 2021 C-USA Tournament winner

The 2020–2021 Louisiana Tech Bulldogs basketball team represented Louisiana Tech University during the 2020–21 NCAA Division I men's basketball season. The team was led by sixth-year head coach Eric Konkol, and played their home games at Thomas Assembly Center in Ruston, Louisiana as a members of the West Division of Conference USA. The Bulldogs finished first in the West Division, but lost in the tournament to North Texas. They received a bid to the National Invitation Tournament, where they lost to Mississippi State, but then defeated Colorado State in the third-place game to win third place.

== Previous season ==
The Bulldogs finished the 2019–20 season 22–8, 13–5 in C-USA play to finish in a tie for second place. They were set to be the No. 3 seed in the C-USA tournament. However, they C-USA Tournament was canceled amid the COVID-19 pandemic.

== Roster ==
2020–21 Louisiana Tech Bulldogs men's basketball team
Players
Coaches

Pos.	#	Name	Height	Weight	Year	Previous school	Hometown
F	1	Kenny Hunter	6 ft 9 in (2.06 m)	235 lb (107 kg)	Fr	Huntington HS	Shreveport, LA
F	2	Kenneth Lofton Jr.	6 ft 7 in (2.01 m)	275 lb (125 kg)	Fr	Memorial HS	Port Arthur, TX
G	3	Amorie Archibald	6 ft 3 in (1.91 m)	185 lb (84 kg)	Sr	Trinity Christian Academy	Deltona, FL
G	4	Lane Hartley	6 ft 2 in (1.88 m)	200 lb (91 kg)	Sr	Weston HS; Bossier Parish CC	Chataham, LA
G	5	Kalob Ledoux	6 ft 4 in (1.93 m)	190 lb (86 kg)	RS Sr	Lafayette Christian Academy; McNeese State	Port Barre, LA
G	10	Xaiver Armstead	6 ft 5 in (1.96 m)	200 lb (91 kg)	Sr	Midway HS; McLennan CC	Waco, TX
G	11	JaColby Pemberton	6 ft 5 in (1.96 m)	195 lb (88 kg)	RS Sr	Lancaster HS	Dallas, TX
F	13	Stacey Thomas	6 ft 8 in (2.03 m)	220 lb (100 kg)	Jr	Fortbend Christian Home School	Houston, TX
G	21	Exavian Christon	6 ft 4 in (1.93 m)	200 lb (91 kg)	Sr	Hot Springs HS	Hot Springs, AR
F	22	Isaiah Crawford	6 ft 6 in (1.98 m)	220 lb (100 kg)	So	North Crowley HS	Fort Worth, TX
G	24	Cobe Williams	5 ft 11 in (1.8 m)	175 lb (79 kg)	So	Kimball HS	Dallas, TX
G	25	Thailand Elder	6 ft 2 in (1.88 m)	170 lb (77 kg)	Fr	Allen HS	Chicago, IL
F	33	Andrew Gordon	6 ft 10 in (2.08 m)	260 lb (118 kg)	RS Sr	Dunedin HS; West Virginia	Clearwater, FL
F	40	Kale Walters (W)	6 ft 7 in (2.01 m)	200 lb (91 kg)	Jr	Lindale HS	Lindale, TX

Head coach

- Eric Konkol (UW–Eau Claire)

Assistant coach(es)

- Duffy Conroy (St. Ambrose)
- Talvin Hester (Texas Wesleyan)
- Desmond Haymon (Stephen F. Austin)

Legend

- (C) Team captain
- (S) Suspended
- (I) Ineligible
- (W) Walk-on
- Injured
- Current redshirt

Roster
Last update: February 1, 2021

== Schedule and results ==
Date time, TV	Rank^{#}	Opponent^{#}	Result	Record	Site (attendance) city, state
Regular season
November 27, 2020*; 6:30 p.m.		UT Arlington; Louisiana Tech Classic	W 76–71	1–0	Thomas Assembly Center (1,200); Ruston, LA
November 29, 2020*; 1:00 p.m.		Northwestern State; Louisiana Tech Classic	W 91–77	2–0	Thomas Assembly Center (1,200); Ruston, LA
December 3, 2020*; 6:30 p.m.		Louisiana–Monroe	W 78–62	3–0	Thomas Assembly Center (1,200); Ruston, LA
December 6, 2020*; 5:00 p.m.		at LSU	L 55–86	3–1	Pete Maravich Assembly Center (2,505); Baton Rouge, LA
December 9, 2020*; 6:30 p.m.		Southeastern Louisiana	W 78–69	4–1	Thomas Assembly Center (1,200); Ruston, LA
December 12, 2020*; 6:00 p.m.		at Louisiana	L 56–61	4–2	Cajundome (1,459); Lafayette, LA
December 15, 2020*; 6:30 p.m.		Jackson State	W 85–58	5–2	Thomas Assembly Center (1,200); Ruston, LA
December 19, 2020*; 1:00 p.m.		Lamar	W 86–57	6–2	Thomas Assembly Center (1,200); Ruston, LA
December 22, 2020*; 6:30 p.m.		at Louisiana–Monroe	W 68–57	7–2	Fant–Ewing Coliseum (1,122); Monroe, LA
January 1, 2021; 6:30 p.m.		Marshall	W 75–68	8–2 (1–0)	Thomas Assembly Center (1,200); Ruston, LA
January 2, 2021; 6:00 p.m.		Marshall	L 73–80	8–3 (1–1)	Thomas Assembly Center (1,200); Ruston, LA
January 8, 2021; 7:00 p.m.		at Western Kentucky	L 64–66	8–4 (1–2)	E. A. Diddle Arena (1,102); Bowling Green, KY
January 9, 2021; 6:00 p.m.		at Western Kentucky	W 63–58	9–4 (2–2)	E. A. Diddle Arena (1,123); Bowling Green, KY
January 15, 2021; 6:30 p.m.		UTSA	W 77–66	10–4 (3–2)	Thomas Assembly Center (1,200); Ruston, LA
January 16, 2021; 6:00 p.m.		UTSA	W 82–66	11–4 (4–2)	Thomas Assembly Center (1,200); Ruston, LA
January 22, 2021; 8:00 p.m.		at UTEP	L 74–82	11–5 (4–3)	Don Haskins Center (533); El Paso, TX
January 23, 2021; 7:00 p.m.		at UTEP	W 73–55	12–5 (5–3)	Don Haskins Center (515); El Paso, TX
January 28, 2021; 6:00 p.m.		at Southern Miss	W 76–63	13–5 (6–3)	Reed Green Coliseum (1,200); Hattiesburg, MS
January 30, 2021; 2:00 p.m.		Southern Miss	W 65–62	14–5 (7–3)	Reed Green Coliseum (1,200); Hattiesburg, MS
February 5, 2021; 7:00 p.m.		at North Texas	W 68–63	15–5 (8–3)	UNT Coliseum (1,535); Denton, TX
February 6, 2021; 1:00 p.m.		at North Texas	L 55–57	15–6 (8–4)	UNT Coliseum (1,532); Denton, TX
February 12, 2021; 6:30 p.m.		UAB	W 70–58	16–6 (9–4)	Thomas Assembly Center (1,200); Ruston, LA
February 13, 2021; 3:00 p.m.		UAB	W 69–64	17–6 (10–4)	Thomas Assembly Center (1,200); Ruston, LA
February 20, 2021; 4:00 p.m.		at Middle Tennessee	Canceled (Note: Game was canceled due to weather concerns.)		Murphy Center; Murfreesboro, TN
February 21, 2021; 2:00 p.m.		at Middle Tennessee	Canceled		Murphy Center; Murfreesboro, TN
February 26, 2021; 6:30 p.m.		Rice	W 101–57	18–6 (11–4)	Thomas Assembly Center (1,200); Ruston, LA
February 27, 2021; 6:00 p.m.		Rice	W 79–58	19–6 (12–4)	Thomas Assembly Center (1,200); Ruston, LA
March 3, 2021*; 7:00 p.m.		Our Lady of the Lake	W 99–66	20–6	Thomas Assembly Center (1,200); Ruston, LA
Conference USA tournament
March 11, 2021; 8:30 p.m., Stadium	(W1)	vs. (E4) Florida Atlantic; Quarterfinals	W 75–69	21–6	Ford Center at The Star; Frisco, TX
March 12, 2021; 3:00 p.m., CBSSN	(W1)	vs. (W3) North Texas; Semifinals	L 48–54	21–7	Ford Center at The Star; Frisco, TX
NIT
March 19, 2021; 8:00 pm, ESPN2	(4)	vs. (1) Ole Miss; First round – Ole Miss bracket	W 70–61	22–7	Comerica Center (543); Frisco, TX
March 25, 2021; 9:00 pm, ESPN2	(4)	vs. (3) Western Kentucky; Quarterfinals– Ole Miss bracket	W 72–65	23–7	Comerica Center; Frisco, TX
March 27, 2021; 2:00 pm, ESPN	(4)	vs. (4) Mississippi State; Semifinals	L 62–84	23–8	Comerica Center; Frisco, TX
March 28, 2021; 2:00 pm, ESPN	(4)	vs. (1) Colorado State; Third-place game	W 76–74	24–8	Comerica Center; Frisco, TX
*Non-conference game. ^{#}Rankings from AP Poll. (#) Tournament seedings in parentheses. All times are in Central.

== See also ==
- 2020–21 Louisiana Tech Lady Techsters basketball team
