= 2021 Conference USA men's basketball tournament =

- Classification: Division I
- Season: 2020–21
- Teams: 14
- Site: Ford Center at The Star; Frisco, Texas
- Champions: North Texas (1st title)
- Winning coach: Grant McCasland (1st title)
- MVP: Javion Hamlet (North Texas)
- Television: Stadium, ESPN+, CBSSN

2020–21 Conference USA men's basketball standings
	Conf.				Overall
Team	W		L	PCT	W		L	PCT
East
Western Kentucky	11	–	3	.786	21	–	8	.724
Old Dominion	11	–	5	.688	15	–	8	.652
Marshall	9	–	5	.643	15	–	7	.682
Florida Atlantic	7	–	5	.583	13	–	10	.565
Charlotte	5	–	11	.313	9	–	15	.375
Middle Tennessee	3	–	13	.188	5	–	18	.217
FIU	2	–	15	.118	9	–	17	.346
West
Louisiana Tech	12	–	4	.750	24	–	8	.750
UAB	13	–	5	.722	22	–	7	.759
North Texas †	9	–	5	.643	18	–	10	.643
UTSA	9	–	7	.563	15	–	11	.577
UTEP	8	–	8	.500	12	–	12	.500
Rice	6	–	10	.375	15	–	13	.536
Southern Miss	4	–	13	.235	8	–	17	.320
† 2021 C-USA Tournament winner

The 2021 Conference USA men's basketball tournament was the concluding event of the 2020–21 Conference USA (C-USA) men's basketball season. It was held from March 10–13, 2021 alongside the C-USA women's tournament in Frisco, Texas, at the Ford Center at The Star. In the first round and quarterfinals, two games were played simultaneously within the same arena, with the courts separated by a curtain.

== Seeds ==
Seed	School	Record	Tiebreaker
#1 East	Western Kentucky	11–3	
#1 West	Louisiana Tech	12–4	
#2 East	Old Dominion	11–5	
#2 West	UAB	13–5	
#3 East	Marshall	9–5	
#3 West	North Texas	9–5	
#4 East	Florida Atlantic	7–5	
#4 West	UTSA	9–7	
#5 East	Charlotte	5–11	
#5 West	UTEP	8–8	
#6 East	Middle Tennessee	3–13	
#6 West	Rice	6–10	
#7 East	FIU	2–15	
#7 West	Southern Miss	4–13	

== Schedule ==
Rankings denote tournament seed.

Game	Time	Matchup	Score	Television
First Round – Tuesday, March 9
1	7:00 pm	W6 Rice vs. W7 Southern Miss	61–52	ESPN+
2	7:30 pm	E6 Middle Tennessee vs. E7 FIU	Cancelled (Note: FIU withdrew from the Conference USA Tournament due to COVID-19 protocols, which led to the game being cancelled, and Middle Tennessee advancing in the tournament.)	ESPN+
Second Round – Wednesday, March 10
3	5:30 pm	W4 UTSA vs. E5 Charlotte	72–62	ESPN+
4	6:00 pm	E3 Marshall vs. W6 Rice	68–72	ESPN+
5	8:30 pm	E4 FAU vs. W5 UTEP	76–70	ESPN+
6	9:00 pm	W3 North Texas vs. E6 Middle Tennessee	76–56	ESPN+
Quarterfinals – Thursday, March 11
7	5:30 pm	E1 Western Kentucky vs. W4 UTSA	80–67	Stadium
8	6:00 pm	W2 UAB vs. W6 Rice	73–60	Stadium
9	8:30 pm	W1 Louisiana Tech vs. E4 FAU	75–69	Stadium
10	9:00 pm	E2 Old Dominion vs. W3 North Texas	55-61	Stadium
Semifinals – Friday, March 12
11	11:00 am	E1 Western Kentucky vs. W2 UAB	64–60	CBSSN
12	2:00 pm	W1 Louisiana Tech vs. W3 North Texas	48–54	CBSSN
Championship – Saturday, March 13
13	8:00 pm	E1 Western Kentucky vs. W3 North Texas	57–61	CBSSN
*Game times in CT. #-Rankings denote tournament seed

== Bracket ==
First round Tuesday, March 9 ESPN+
W6	Rice	61
W7	Southern Miss	52
E6	Middle Tennessee
E7	~~FIU~~

Second round Wednesday, March 10; ESPN+
W4	UTSA	72
E5	Charlotte	62
E3	Marshall	68
W6	Rice	72
E4	Florida Atlantic	76
W5	UTEP	70
W3	North Texas	76
E6	Middle Tennessee	56

Quarterfinals; Thursday, March 11; Stadium
E1	Western Kentucky	80
W4	UTSA	67
W2	UAB	73
W6	Rice	60
W1	Louisiana Tech	75
E4	Florida Atlantic	69
E2	Old Dominion	55
W3	North Texas	61

Semifinals; Friday, March 12; CBSSN
E1	Western Kentucky	64
W2	UAB	60
W1	Louisiana Tech	48
W3	North Texas	54

Championship; Saturday, March 13; CBSSN
E1	Western Kentucky	57
W3	North Texas	61*

* denotes overtime period.

== See also ==
- 2021 Conference USA women's basketball tournament
