= 2020–21 Middle Tennessee Blue Raiders men's basketball team =

American college basketball season

2020–21 Middle Tennessee Blue Raiders men's basketball
- Conference: Conference USA
- East Division
- Record: 5–18 (3–13 C-USA)
- Head coach: Nick McDevitt (3rd season)
- Assistant coaches: Sean Dixon; Wes Long; Andre Morgan
- Home arena: Murphy Center

2020–21 Conference USA men's basketball standings
	Conf.				Overall
Team	W		L	PCT	W		L	PCT
East
Western Kentucky	11	–	3	.786	21	–	8	.724
Old Dominion	11	–	5	.688	15	–	8	.652
Marshall	9	–	5	.643	15	–	7	.682
Florida Atlantic	7	–	5	.583	13	–	10	.565
Charlotte	5	–	11	.313	9	–	15	.375
Middle Tennessee	3	–	13	.188	5	–	18	.217
FIU	2	–	15	.118	9	–	17	.346
West
Louisiana Tech	12	–	4	.750	24	–	8	.750
UAB	13	–	5	.722	22	–	7	.759
North Texas †	9	–	5	.643	18	–	10	.643
UTSA	9	–	7	.563	15	–	11	.577
UTEP	8	–	8	.500	12	–	12	.500
Rice	6	–	10	.375	15	–	13	.536
Southern Miss	4	–	13	.235	8	–	17	.320
† 2021 C-USA Tournament winner

The 2020–21 Middle Tennessee Blue Raiders men's basketball team represented Middle Tennessee State University during the 2020–21 NCAA Division I men's basketball season. The team was led by third-year head coach Nick McDevitt, and played their home games at Murphy Center in Murfreesboro, Tennessee as members of Conference USA (C-USA).

In a season limited due to the ongoing COVID-19 pandemic, the Blue Raiders finished the season 5–18, 3–13 in C-USA play, to finish in sixth place in East Division. In the first round of the C-USA tournament, the Blue Raiders advanced to the second round when FIU was forced to withdraw due to positive COVID-19 tests. In the second round, they lost to North Texas.

== Previous season ==
The Blue Raiders finished the 2019–20 season 8–23, 4–14 in C-USA play, to finish in last place. They failed to qualify for the C-USA tournament.

== Roster ==
2020–21 Middle Tennessee Blue Raiders men's basketball team
Players
Coaches

Pos.	#	Name	Height	Weight	Year	Hometown
G	0	Jordan Davis	6 ft 3 in (1.91 m)	195 lb (88 kg)	RS Jr	Irmo, SC
F	1	Tyler Millin	6 ft 7 in (2.01 m)	205 lb (93 kg)	So	Calera, AL
F	2	DeAndre Dishman	6 ft 6 in (1.98 m)	235 lb (107 kg)	RS Jr	Lexington, KY
G	3	Donovan Sims	6 ft 1 in (1.85 m)	160 lb (73 kg)	Sr	Murfreesboro, TN
F	4	Tyson Jackson	6 ft 9 in (2.06 m)	245 lb (111 kg)	So	Fairburn, GA
G	5	Eli Lawrence	6 ft 5 in (1.96 m)	185 lb (84 kg)	So	Atlanta, GA
G/F	13	Jayce Johnson	6 ft 5 in (1.96 m)	210 lb (95 kg)	Jr	Buffalo, NY
G	14	Jalen Jordan	6 ft 3 in (1.91 m)	160 lb (73 kg)	RS Jr	Conyers, GA
F	15	Christian Fussell	6 ft 10 in (2.08 m)	215 lb (98 kg)	RS Fr	Decatur, GA
F	21	Jo'Vontae Millner-Criss	6 ft 6 in (1.98 m)	200 lb (91 kg)	RS Sr	Burlington, NC
F	22	Elias King	6 ft 8 in (2.03 m)	200 lb (91 kg)	So	Atlanta, GA
F	23	Jared Coleman-Jones	6 ft 10 in (2.08 m)	240 lb (109 kg)	So	Hiram, GA
F	24	Marcus Mitchell	6 ft 7 in (2.01 m)	225 lb (102 kg)	RS Sr	Memphis, TN
G	33	Dontrell Shuler	6 ft 2 in (1.88 m)	180 lb (82 kg)	RS Jr	Irmo, SC

Head coach

- Nick McDevitt (UNC Asheville)

Assistant coach(es)

- Sean Dixon (Presbyterian)
- Wes Long (Clemson)
- Andre Morgan (North Georgia)

Legend

- (C) Team captain
- (S) Suspended
- (I) Ineligible
- (W) Walk-on
- Injured
- Current redshirt

Roster
Last update: January 31, 2021

== Schedule and results ==
Date time, TV	Rank^{#}	Opponent^{#}	Result	Record	Site (attendance) city, state
Non-conference regular season
November 25, 2020*; 1:00 p.m.		vs. Akron; Gulf Coast Showcase	Canceled (Note: Game was canceled due to COVID-19 pandemic-related issues.)		Hertz Arena; Estero, FL
November 26, 2020*; 11:00 a.m.		vs. Omaha; Gulf Coast Showcase	L 59–60	0–1	Hertz Arena (50); Estero, FL
November 27, 2020*; 11:00 a.m.		vs. East Tennessee State; Gulf Coast Showcase	L 43–57	0–2	Hertz Arena (50); Estero, FL
December 2, 2020*; 6:30 p.m.		Murray State	W 78–61	1–2	Murphy Center (100); Murfreesboro, TN
December 7, 2020*; 6:00 p.m.		Chattanooga	L 70–80	1–3	Murphy Center; Murfreesboro, TN
December 12, 2020*; 4:00 p.m.		Covenant	W 76–57	2–3	Murphy Center (100); Murfreesboro, TN
December 16, 2020*; 7:00 p.m., CBSSN		Ole Miss	L 51–70	2–4	Murphy Center (100); Murfreesboro, TN
December 19, 2020*; 6:00 p.m., ESPN+		at Bellarmine	Canceled		Freedom Hall; Louisville, KY
December 22, 2020*; 6:00 p.m.		Bellarmine	Canceled		Murphy Center; Murfreesboro, TN
CUSA regular season
January 8, 2021; 6:00 p.m., ESPN+		at FIU	L 55–68	2–5 (0–1)	Murphy Center (100); Murfreesboro, TN
January 9, 2021; 4:00 p.m., ESPN+		at FIU	W 67–56	3–5 (1–1)	Murphy Center (100); Murfreesboro, TN
January 15, 2021; 7:00 p.m., ESPN+		at Southern Miss	L 54–84	3–6 (1–2)	Reed Green Coliseum (1,200); Hattiesburg, MS
January 16, 2021; 4:00 p.m., ESPN+		at Southern Miss	L 59–64	3–7 (1–3)	Reed Green Coliseum (1,200); Hattiesburg, MS
January 23, 2021; 4:00 p.m., ESPN+		Western Kentucky	L 67–82	3–8 (1–4)	Murphy Center (100); Murfreesboro, TN
January 24, 2021; 1:00 p.m., CBSSN		Western Kentucky	L 52–68	3–9 (1–5)	Murphy Center (100); Murfreesboro, TN
January 28, 2021; 8:00 p.m., CBSSN		UAB	L 59–70	3–10 (1–6)	Murphy Center (100); Murfreesboro, TN
January 31, 2021; 2:00 p.m., ESPN+		at UAB	L 52–63	3–11 (1–7)	Bartow Arena (1,068); Birmingham, AL
February 5, 2021; 6:00 p.m., ESPN+		Charlotte	W 66–65	4–11 (2–7)	Murphy Center (800); Murfreesboro, TN
February 6, 2021; 4:00 p.m., ESPN+		Charlotte	W 73–60	5–11 (3–7)	Murphy Center (800); Murfreesboro, TN
February 12, 2021; 5:00 p.m., ESPN+		at Marshall	L 79–107	5–12 (3–8)	Cam Henderson Center (1,083); Huntington, WV
February 13, 2021; 3:00 p.m., ESPN+		at Marshall	L 85–96	5–13 (3–9)	Cam Henderson Center (1,136); Huntington, WV
February 20, 2021; 4:30 p.m., ESPN+		Louisiana Tech	Canceled (Note: Game was canceled due to weather concerns.)		Murphy Center; Murfreesboro, TN
February 21, 2021; 2:00 p.m., ESPN+		Louisiana Tech	Canceled		Murphy Center; Murfreesboro, TN
February 26, 2021; 6:00 p.m., ESPN+		at Old Dominion	L 61–67	5–14 (3–10)	Chartway Arena (250); Norfolk, VA
February 27, 2021; 6:00 p.m., ESPN+		at Old Dominion	L 60–73	5–15 (3–11)	Chartway Arena (250); Norfolk, VA
March 4, 2021; 5:00 p.m.		at Florida Atlantic	L 50–80	5–16 (3–12)	FAU Arena (251); Boca Raton, FL
March 5, 2021; 5:00 p.m.		at Florida Atlantic	L 54–63	5–17 (3–13)	FAU Arena (402); Boca Raton, FL
Conference USA tournament
March 9, 2021; 7:30 p.m., ESPN+	(E6)	vs. (E7) FIU; Preliminary round	Cancelled		Ford Center at The Star; Frisco, TX
March 10, 2021; 9:00 p.m., ESPN+	(E6)	vs. (W3) North Texas; Second round	L 56–76	5–18	Ford Center at The Star; Frisco, TX
*Non-conference game. ^{#}Rankings from AP poll. (#) Tournament seedings in parentheses. All times are in Central.

== See also ==
- 2020–21 Middle Tennessee Blue Raiders women's basketball team
