= 2020–21 UAB Blazers men's basketball team =

American college basketball season

2020–21 UAB Blazers men's basketball
- Conference: Conference USA
- West Division
- Record: 22–7 (13–5 C-USA)
- Head coach: Andy Kennedy (1st season)
- Assistant coaches: Philip Pearson; Ryan Cross; Terry Parker
- Home arena: Bartow Arena

2020–21 Conference USA men's basketball standings
	Conf.				Overall
Team	W		L	PCT	W		L	PCT
East
Western Kentucky	11	–	3	.786	21	–	8	.724
Old Dominion	11	–	5	.688	15	–	8	.652
Marshall	9	–	5	.643	15	–	7	.682
Florida Atlantic	7	–	5	.583	13	–	10	.565
Charlotte	5	–	11	.313	9	–	15	.375
Middle Tennessee	3	–	13	.188	5	–	18	.217
FIU	2	–	15	.118	9	–	17	.346
West
Louisiana Tech	12	–	4	.750	24	–	8	.750
UAB	13	–	5	.722	22	–	7	.759
North Texas †	9	–	5	.643	18	–	10	.643
UTSA	9	–	7	.563	15	–	11	.577
UTEP	8	–	8	.500	12	–	12	.500
Rice	6	–	10	.375	15	–	13	.536
Southern Miss	4	–	13	.235	8	–	17	.320
† 2021 C-USA Tournament winner

The 2020–21 UAB Blazers basketball team represented the University of Alabama at Birmingham during the 2020–21 NCAA Division I men's basketball season. The Blazers, led by first-year head coach Andy Kennedy, played their home games at the Bartow Arena as members of Conference USA.

== Offseason ==
=== Departures ===
Name	Number	Pos.	Height	Weight	Year	Hometown	Reason for departure
Makhtar Gueye	5	F	6'10"	210	Junior	Rufisque, Senegal	Transferred to California Baptist
Luis Hurtado	10	G	6'6"	210	RS Sophomore	Mérida, Venezuela	Transferred to Bryant
Will Butler	12	F	6'8"	245	Senior	Troy, New York	Graduated
Joshua Sippial	15	G	6'2"	180	Sophomore	Montgomery, Alabama	Transferred
Jordan Brinson	23	G	6'2"	175	Freshman	Inglewood, California	Transferred to Utah Valley
Antonio Ralat	25	G	6'2"	200	Senior	San Juan, Puerto Rico	Graduated
Rashawn Fredericks	32	G	6'5"	200	Senior	St. Croix, Virgin Islands	Graduate Transfer to James Madison
Jude Akabueze	34	F	6'8"	260	RS Freshman	Lagos, Nigeria	Transferred to Jones County Junior College

=== Incoming transfers ===
Name	Number	Pos.	Height	Weight	Year	Hometown	Previous School
Michael Ertel	2	G	6'2"	190	Senior	Indianapolis, Indiana	Graduate transfer from Louisiana–Monroe
Simeon Kirkland	10	F	6'10"	225	Junior	Ocala, Florida	Junior college transfer from Florida Southwestern State College
Quan Jackson	13	G	6'4"	180	Senior	Tallahassee, Florida	Graduate transfer from Georgia Southern
Trey Jemison	55	C	7'0"	256	Junior	Birmingham, Alabama	Transferred from Clemson. Granted immediate eligibility wavier from the NCAA.

== Roster ==
2020–21 UAB Blazers men's basketball team
Players
Coaches

Pos.	#	Name	Height	Weight	Year	Previous school	Hometown
G	0	Tyreek Scott-Grayson	6 ft 5 in (1.96 m)	177 lb (80 kg)	Sr	Suffield Academy; State Fair Community College	Brick, New Jersey
G	2	Michael Ertel	6 ft 2 in (1.88 m)	190 lb (86 kg)	Sr	Louisiana–Monroe	Indianapolis, Indiana
G	3	Tavin Lovan	6 ft 4 in (1.93 m)	196 lb (89 kg)	Jr	Franklin-Simpson High School	Franklin, Kentucky
G	4	Koby Jeffries	6 ft 3 in (1.91 m)	190 lb (86 kg)	RS Fr	First Assembly Christian School	Olive Branch, Mississippi
G	5	Jalen Benjamin	5 ft 10 in (1.78 m)	140 lb (64 kg)	RS So	Meadowcreek High School	Raleigh, North Carolina
F	10	Simeon Kirkland	6 ft 10 in (2.08 m)	225 lb (102 kg)	Jr	IMG Academy; Florida Southwestern State College	Ocala, Florida
G	11	Kassim Nicholson	6 ft 7 in (2.01 m)	200 lb (91 kg)	Sr	Callaway High School; Holmes CC	Jackson, MS
G	12	Tony Toney	6 ft 2 in (1.88 m)	180 lb (82 kg)	Fr	Mae Jeminson High School	Huntsville, Alabama
G	13	Quan Jackson	6 ft 4 in (1.93 m)	180 lb (82 kg)	Sr	Georgia Southern	Tallahassee, Florida
F	15	Terrell Ard, Jr.	6 ft 7 in (2.01 m)	210 lb (95 kg)	Fr	Putnam Science Academy	Acworth, Georgia
G	21	Jon Coleman	5 ft 10 in (1.78 m)	170 lb (77 kg)	So	Hall High School	Little Rock, Arkansas
G	25	Rongie Gordon	6 ft 8 in (2.03 m)	225 lb (102 kg)	Fr	Jefferson Davis High School	Montgomery, Alabama
G	33	Tobias Rotegård	6 ft 7 in (2.01 m)	210 lb (95 kg)	Fr	Sunrise Christian Academy	Kongsberg, Norway
C	55	Trey Jemison	7 ft 0 in (2.13 m)	256 lb (116 kg)	Jr	Hoover High School; Clemson	Birmingham, Alabama

Head coach

- Andy Kennedy (UAB)

Assistant coach(es)

- Philip Pearson (Alabama)
- Ryan Cross (Buffalo)
- Terry Parker (Louisiana Tech)

Legend

- (C) Team captain
- (S) Suspended
- (I) Ineligible
- (W) Walk-on
- Injured
- Current redshirt

Roster

== Schedule and results ==
Date time, TV	Rank^{#}	Opponent^{#}	Result	Record	Site (attendance) city, state
Regular season
Nov 25, 2020*; 2:30 pm, CUSAtv		Alcorn State	W 99–50	1–0	Bartow Arena (906); Birmingham, AL
Nov 28, 2020*; 2:00 pm		Southeastern Louisiana	W 84–59	2–0	Bartow Arena (709); Birmingham, AL
Dec 2, 2020*; 6:30 pm		Kennesaw State	W 73–48	3–0	Bartow Arena (820); Birmingham, AL
Dec 6, 2020*; 2:00 pm		Troy	W 77–55	4–0	Bartow Arena (969); Birmingham, AL
Dec 9, 2020*; 6:30 pm		Mobile	Canceled (Note: Game was canceled due to COVID-19 pandemic related issues.)		Bartow Arena; Birmingham, AL
Dec 9, 2020*; 6:30 pm		Tuskegee	W 89–64	5–0	Bartow Arena (771); Birmingham, AL
Dec 12, 2020*; 3:00 pm, ESPN+		at East Tennessee State	W 65–61	6–0	Freedom Hall Civic Center (124); Johnson City, TN
Dec 16, 2020*; 6:30 pm		Southern	W 88–46	7–0	Bartow Arena (784); Birmingham, AL
Dec 19, 2020*; 2:00 pm		Chattanooga	L 66–69	7–1	Bartow Arena (819); Birmingham, AL
Dec 23, 2020*; 8:00 pm, CBSSN		Georgia Tech	Canceled		Bartow Arena; Birmingham, AL
Jan 1, 2021; 7:00 pm, ESPN+		at North Texas	Postponed (Note: Game was postponed due to COVID-19 pandemic related issues.)		The Super Pit; Denton, TX
Jan 2, 2021; 4:00 pm, ESPN+		at North Texas	Postponed		The Super Pit; Denton, TX
Jan 8, 2021; 6:30 pm		Southern Miss	W 72–60	8–1 (1–0)	Bartow Arena (925); Birmingham, AL
Jan 9, 2021; 4:00 pm, ESPN+		Southern Miss	W 62–58	9–1 (2–0)	Bartow Arena (932); Birmingham, AL
Jan 15, 2021; 4:00 pm, ESPNU		at Charlotte	W 61–37	10–1 (3–0)	Dale F. Halton Arena; Charlotte, NC
Jan 16, 2021; 3:00 pm, ESPN+		at Charlotte	L 55–70	10–2 (3–1)	Dale F. Halton Arena; Charlotte, NC
Jan 22, 2021; 6:30 pm		Rice	W 78–68	11–2 (4–1)	Bartow Arena (1,099); Birmingham, AL
Jan 23, 2021; 4:00 pm, ESPN+		Rice	W 86–74	12–2 (5–1)	Bartow Arena (989); Birmingham, AL
Jan 29, 2021; 8:00 pm, CBSSN		at Middle Tennessee	W 70–59	13–2 (6–1)	Murphy Center (100); Murfreesboro, TN
Jan 31, 2021; 1:00 pm, ESPN+		Middle Tennessee	W 63–52	14–2 (7–1)	Bartow Arena (1,068); Birmingham, AL
Feb 5, 2021; 6:30 pm, ESPN+		UTEP	W 63–51	15–2 (8–1)	Bartow Arena (1,138); Birmingham, AL
Feb 6, 2021; 4:00 pm, ESPN+		UTEP	W 75–60	16–2 (9–1)	Bartow Arena (1,058); Birmingham, AL
Feb 12, 2021; 6:30 pm, Stadium		at Louisiana Tech	L 58–70	16–3 (9–2)	Thomas Assembly Center (1,200); Ruston, LA
Feb 13, 2021; 6:00 pm, Stadium		at Louisiana Tech	L 64–69	16–4 (9–3)	Thomas Assembly Center (1,200); Ruston, LA
Feb 19, 2021; 6:30 pm, Stadium		Old Dominion	W 76–69	17–4 (10–3)	Bartow Arena (1,024); Birmingham, AL
Feb 20, 2021; 3:00 pm, Stadium		Old Dominion	L 58–65	17–5 (10–4)	Bartow Arena (1,028); Birmingham, AL
Feb 22, 2021*; 6:00 pm, CUSAtv		Rust College	W 117–45	18–5	Bartow Arena (722); Birmingham, AL
Feb 26, 2021; 6:00 pm, ESPN+		at UTSA	W 64–57	19–5 (11–4)	Convocation Center (429); San Antonio, TX
Feb 27, 2021; 3:00 pm, ESPN+		at UTSA	L 79–96	19–6 (11–5)	Convocation Center (394); San Antonio, TX
Mar 5, 2021; 7:00 p.m., ESPN+		at North Texas	W 65–51	20–6 (12–5)	UNT Coliseum (1,359); Denton, TX
Mar 6, 2021; 4:00 p.m., ESPN+		at North Texas	W 65–61	21–6 (13–5)	UNT Coliseum (1,450); Denton, TX
Conference USA tournament
Mar 11, 2021; 6:00 p.m., Stadium	(W2)	vs. (W6) Rice; Quarterfinals	W 73–60	22–6	Ford Center at The Star; Frisco, TX
Mar 12, 2021; 11:00 a.m., CBSSN	(W2)	vs. (E1) Western Kentucky; Semifinals	L 60–64	22–7	Ford Center at The Star; Frisco, TX
*Non-conference game. ^{#}Rankings from AP Poll. (#) Tournament seedings in parentheses. All times are in Central Time.

== See also ==
- 2020–21 UAB Blazers women's basketball team
