= 2020–21 Charlotte 49ers men's basketball team =

American college basketball season

2020–21 Charlotte 49ers men's basketball
- Conference: Conference USA
- Record: 9–16 (5–11 CUSA)
- Head coach: Ron Sanchez (3rd season)
- Assistant coaches: Aaron Fearne; Kotie Kimble; Vic Sfera
- Home arena: Dale F. Halton Arena

2020–21 Conference USA men's basketball standings
	Conf.				Overall
Team	W		L	PCT	W		L	PCT
East
Western Kentucky	11	–	3	.786	21	–	8	.724
Old Dominion	11	–	5	.688	15	–	8	.652
Marshall	9	–	5	.643	15	–	7	.682
Florida Atlantic	7	–	5	.583	13	–	10	.565
Charlotte	5	–	11	.313	9	–	15	.375
Middle Tennessee	3	–	13	.188	5	–	18	.217
FIU	2	–	15	.118	9	–	17	.346
West
Louisiana Tech	12	–	4	.750	24	–	8	.750
UAB	13	–	5	.722	22	–	7	.759
North Texas †	9	–	5	.643	18	–	10	.643
UTSA	9	–	7	.563	15	–	11	.577
UTEP	8	–	8	.500	12	–	12	.500
Rice	6	–	10	.375	15	–	13	.536
Southern Miss	4	–	13	.235	8	–	17	.320
† 2021 C-USA Tournament winner

The 2020–21 Charlotte 49ers men's basketball team represented the University of North Carolina at Charlotte during the 2020–21 NCAA Division I men's basketball season. The team was led by third-year head coach Ron Sanchez, and played their home games at Dale F. Halton Arena in Charlotte, North Carolina as members of Conference USA.

== Previous season ==
The 49ers finished the 2018–19 season 16–13, 10–8 in C-USA play to finish in fourth place. They were set to be the No. 4 seed in the C-USA tournament. However, they C-USA Tournament was canceled amid the COVID-19 pandemic.

== Roster ==
2020–21 Charlotte 49ers men's basketball team
Players
Coaches

Pos.	#	Name	Height	Weight	Year	Previous school	Hometown
G	0	Caleb Stone-Carrawell	6 ft 7 in (2.01 m)	215 lb (98 kg)	RS Fr	Cox Mill HS	Concord, NC
G	1	Jahmir Young	6 ft 2 in (1.88 m)	185 lb (84 kg)	So	DeMatha Catholic HS	Upper Marlboro, MD
G	2	Caleb Byrd	6 ft 1 in (1.85 m)	160 lb (73 kg)	Fr	Newton HS	Conyers, GA
G	3	Brice Williams	6 ft 7 in (2.01 m)	215 lb (98 kg)	So	Hopewell HS	Huntersville, NC
F	5	Milos Supica	6 ft 9 in (2.06 m)	240 lb (109 kg)	Sr	Freedom Christian Academy	Belgrade, Serbia
G	10	Marvin Cannon	6 ft 5 in (1.96 m)	170 lb (77 kg)	Sr	Steward School; Washington State	Richmond, VA
G	12	Jackson Threadgill	6 ft 6 in (1.98 m)	185 lb (84 kg)	Fr	Davidson Day School	Concord, NC
G	13	Jordan Shepherd	6 ft 4 in (1.93 m)	190 lb (86 kg)	RS Sr	Asheville Christian Academy; Oklahoma	Asheville, NC
G	14	Regin Larson	6 ft 6 in (1.98 m)	185 lb (84 kg)	So	Hickory Grove Christian School; Pfeiffer	Charlotte, NC
F/C	15	Aly Khalifa	6 ft 10 in (2.08 m)	255 lb (116 kg)	Fr	NBA Global Academy	Alexandria, Egypt
G	20	Isaiah Folkes	6 ft 4 in (1.93 m)	195 lb (88 kg)	Fr	Middleburg Academy	Gainesville, VA
F	25	Jared Garcia	6 ft 8 in (2.03 m)	245 lb (111 kg)	Fr	St. Thomas More School	Houston, TX
G	30	Jhery Matos	6 ft 5 in (1.96 m)	195 lb (88 kg)	GS	West Oaks Academy; Dayton	Santo Domingo, Dominican Republic
F/C	31	Anzac Rissetto	6 ft 10 in (2.08 m)	255 lb (116 kg)	So	Auckland Grammar School	Auckland, New Zealand
G	35	Luka Vasic	6 ft 8 in (2.03 m)	190 lb (86 kg)	RS Jr	Avon Old Farms	Pirot, Serbia

Head coach

- Ron Sanchez (SUNY Oneonta)

Assistant coach(es)

- Aaron Fearne (Mayville State)
- Kotie Kimble (Coastal Carolina)
- Vic Sfera (Memphis)

Legend

- (C) Team captain
- (S) Suspended
- (I) Ineligible
- (W) Walk-on
- Injured
- Current redshirt

Roster
Last update: January 31, 2021

== Schedule and results ==
Date time, TV	Rank^{#}	Opponent^{#}	Result	Record	Site (attendance) city, state
Regular season
November 27, 2020*; 3:00 p.m., YouTube Live		East Carolina; 49ers Tip-Off Classic	L 57–66	0–1	Dale F. Halton Arena; Charlotte, NC
December 4, 2020*; 6:00 p.m., YouTube Live		Georgia State	L 65–76	0–2	Dale F. Halton Arena (74); Charlotte, NC
December 7, 2020*; 6:00 p.m., YouTube Live		South Carolina State	W 78–40	1–2	Dale F. Halton Arena (60); Charlotte, NC
December 11, 2020*; 5:00 p.m., ESPNU		Appalachian State	L 57–61	1–3	Dale F. Halton Arena (73); Charlotte, NC
December 15, 2020*; 7:00 p.m., ESPN+		at Davidson	W 63–52	2–3	John M. Belk Arena; Davidson, NC
December 19, 2020*; 4:00 p.m., YouTube Live		North Carolina A&T	W 76–72	3–3	Dale F. Halton Arena (58); Charlotte, NC
December 22, 2020*; 2:00 p.m., ESPN+		at George Washington	W 66–65	4–3	Charles E. Smith Center; Washington, D.C.
January 1, 2021; 4:00 p.m., Stadium		Western Kentucky	L 63–67	4–4 (0–1)	Dale F. Halton Arena (61); Charlotte, NC
January 2, 2021; 4:00 p.m., Stadium		Western Kentucky	W 75–71 ^{OT}	5–4 (1–1)	Dale F. Halton Arena (64); Charlotte, NC
January 9, 2021*; 7:30 p.m., YouTube Live		Belmont Abbey	L 72–75 ^{OT}	5–5	Dale F. Halton Arena (51); Charlotte, NC
January 15, 2021; 5:00 p.m., ESPNU		UAB	L 37–61	5–6 (1–2)	Dale F. Halton Arena; Charlotte, NC
January 16, 2021; 4:00 p.m., ESPN+		UAB	W 70–55	6–6 (2–2)	Dale F. Halton Arena; Charlotte, NC
January 22, 2021; 7:00 p.m., ESPN+		at Florida Atlantic	L 53–66 ^{OT}	6–7 (2–3)	FAU Arena (420); Boca Raton, FL
January 23, 2021; 4:00 p.m., ESPN+		at Florida Atlantic	W 74–71	7–7 (3–3)	FAU Arena (328); Boca Raton, FL
January 29, 2021; 6:00 p.m., ESPN+		FIU	W 63–55 ^{OT}	8–7 (4–3)	Dale F. Halton Arena; Charlotte, NC
January 30, 2021; 4:00 p.m., ESPN+		FIU	W 68–65	9–7 (5–3)	Dale F. Halton Arena; Charlotte, NC
February 5, 2021; 7:00 p.m., ESPN+		at Middle Tennessee	L 65–66	9–8 (5–4)	Murphy Center (800); Murfreesboro, TN
February 6, 2021; 5:00 p.m., ESPN+		at Middle Tennessee	L 60–73	9–9 (5–5)	Murphy Center (800); Murfreesboro, TN
February 10, 2021; 6:00 p.m., ESPN+		Old Dominion	L 76–78	9–10 (5–6)	Dale F. Halton Arena; Charlotte, NC
February 13, 2021; 4:00 p.m., ESPN+		at Old Dominion	L 45–64	9–11 (5–7)	Chartway Arena (250); Norfolk, VA
February 19, 2021; 6:00 p.m., ESPN+		UTSA	Postponed (Note: Game was postponed due to weather concerns.)		Dale F. Halton Arena; Charlotte, NC
February 20, 2021; 4:00 p.m., ESPN+		UTSA	Postponed		Dale F. Halton Arena; Charlotte, NC
February 27, 2021; 6:00 p.m., ESPN+		at UTEP	L 47–70	9–12 (5–8)	Don Haskins Center (499); El Paso, TX
February 28, 2021; 3:00 p.m., ESPN+		at UTEP	L 62–77	9–13 (5–9)	Don Haskins Center (481); El Paso, TX
March 5, 2021; 7:00 p.m., Stadium		at Marshall	L 67–75	9–14 (5–10)	Cam Henderson Center (1,076); Huntington, WV
March 6, 2021; 2:00 p.m., Stadium		at Marshall	L 66–75	9–15 (5–11)	Cam Henderson Center (1,145); Huntington, WV
Conference USA tournament
March 10, 2021; 6:30 p.m., ESPN+	(E5)	vs. (W4) UTSA; Second Round	L 62–72	9–16	Ford Center at The Star; Frisco, TX
*Non-conference game. ^{#}Rankings from AP Poll. (#) Tournament seedings in parentheses. All times are in Eastern.
