= 2020–21 Florida Atlantic Owls men's basketball team =

American college basketball season

2020–21 Florida Atlantic Owls men's basketball
- Conference: Conference USA
- East Division
- Record: 13–10 (7–5 C-USA)
- Head coach: Dusty May (3rd season)
- Assistant coaches: Akeem Miskdeen; Kyle Church; Todd Abernethy
- Home arena: FAU Arena

2020–21 Conference USA men's basketball standings
	Conf.				Overall
Team	W		L	PCT	W		L	PCT
East
Western Kentucky	11	–	3	.786	21	–	8	.724
Old Dominion	11	–	5	.688	15	–	8	.652
Marshall	9	–	5	.643	15	–	7	.682
Florida Atlantic	7	–	5	.583	13	–	10	.565
Charlotte	5	–	11	.313	9	–	15	.375
Middle Tennessee	3	–	13	.188	5	–	18	.217
FIU	2	–	15	.118	9	–	17	.346
West
Louisiana Tech	12	–	4	.750	24	–	8	.750
UAB	13	–	5	.722	22	–	7	.759
North Texas †	9	–	5	.643	18	–	10	.643
UTSA	9	–	7	.563	15	–	11	.577
UTEP	8	–	8	.500	12	–	12	.500
Rice	6	–	10	.375	15	–	13	.536
Southern Miss	4	–	13	.235	8	–	17	.320
† 2021 C-USA Tournament winner

The 2020–21 Florida Atlantic Owls men's basketball team represented Florida Atlantic University in the 2020–21 NCAA Division I men's basketball season. The Owls, led by third-year head coach Dusty May, played their home games at FAU Arena in Boca Raton, Florida as members of East Division of Conference USA.

== Previous season ==
The Owls finished the 2019–20 season 17–15, 8–10 in C-USA play to finish in ninth place. They defeated Old Dominion in the first round of the C-USA tournament and were set to take on North Texas in the quarterfinals. However, the remainder of the tournament was canceled amid the COVID-19 pandemic.

== Roster ==
2020–21 Florida Atlantic Owls men's basketball team
Players
Coaches

Pos.	#	Name	Height	Weight	Year	Previous school	Hometown
G	0	Nick Boyd	6 ft 3 in (1.91 m)	171 lb (78 kg)	Fr	Don Bosco Prep	Garnerville, New York
F	1	Madiaw Niang	6 ft 9 in (2.06 m)	210 lb (95 kg)	Jr	DME Academy	Dakar, Senegal
G	2	Everett Winchester	6 ft 7 in (2.01 m)	212 lb (96 kg)	RS Sr	Gilman School; Wright State	Baltimore, Maryland
F	3	Giancarlo Rosado	6 ft 8 in (2.03 m)	239 lb (108 kg)	Fr	Palm Beach Lakes HS	West Palm Beach, Florida
G	4	Bryan Greenlee	6 ft 0 in (1.83 m)	195 lb (88 kg)	So	The Rock School; Minnesota	Gainesville, Florida
G	10	Johnell Davis	6 ft 3 in (1.91 m)	203 lb (92 kg)	Fr	21st Century Charter	Gary, Indiana
G	11	Michael Forrest	6 ft 0 in (1.83 m)	175 lb (79 kg)	Jr	Blanche Ely HS	Lauderhill, Florida
G	12	Alijah Martin	6 ft 0 in (1.83 m)	213 lb (97 kg)	Fr	North Pike HS	Summit, Mississippi
G	13	Kenan Blackshear	6 ft 6 in (1.98 m)	215 lb (98 kg)	So	Jones HS	Orlando, Florida
F	15	Jailyn Ingram	6 ft 7 in (2.01 m)	219 lb (99 kg)	Sr	Morgan County HS	Madison, Georgia
G	21	Alejandro Ralat	5 ft 11 in (1.8 m)	160 lb (73 kg)	RS Fr	Saint Andrew's School	San Juan, Puerto Rico
G	22	Branndon Patrick	6 ft 7 in (2.01 m)	173 lb (78 kg)	Fr	Northeast HS	North Lauderdale, Florida
F/C	25	Karlis Silins	6 ft 11 in (2.11 m)	249 lb (113 kg)	RS Jr	BK VEF Rīga; Ole Miss	Riga, Latvia
G	30	Joe French	6 ft 5 in (1.96 m)	180 lb (82 kg)	RS So	Master's Academy; Bethune–Cookman	Orlando, Florida
F	32	Brant Ulmer	6 ft 7 in (2.01 m)	196 lb (89 kg)	So	Suwannee HS	Live Oak, Florida
F/C	35	Dardan Kapiti	6 ft 10 in (2.08 m)	210 lb (95 kg)	Fr	The Rock School	Pristina, Kosovo

Head coach

- Dusty May (Indiana)

Assistant coach(es)

- Akeem Miskdeen (Queens (NC))
- Kyle Church (Charlotte)
- Todd Abernethy (Mississippi)

Legend

- (C) Team captain
- (S) Suspended
- (I) Ineligible
- (W) Walk-on
- Injured
- Current redshirt

Roster
Last update: January 6, 2021

== Schedule and results ==
Date time, TV	Rank^{#}	Opponent^{#}	Result	Record	Site (attendance) city, state
Non-conference regular season
November 25, 2020*; 7:00 pm, ESPN+		at South Alabama; Ungar Memorial Tournament	L 66–68	0–1	Mitchell Center (945); Mobile, AL
November 27, 2020*; 1:00 pm		vs. Jacksonville State; Ungar Memorial Tournament	L 50–60	0–2	Mitchell Center (138); Mobile, AL
November 28, 2020*; 2:00 pm		vs. Mobile; Ungar Memorial Tournament	W 83–41	1–2	Mitchell Center (141); Mobile, AL
December 3, 2020*; 7:00 pm, CUSA.tv		Florida National	W 128–64	2–2	FAU Arena (372); Boca Raton, FL
December 7, 2020*; 7:30 pm, ESPN+		at North Florida	W 79–77	3–2	UNF Arena (656); Jacksonville, FL
December 12, 2020*; 12:00 pm, CUSA.tv		Florida Memorial	W 112–49	4–2	FAU Arena (228); Boca Raton, FL
December 15, 2020*; 7:00 pm		at Stetson	L 69–78	4–3	Edmunds Center; DeLand, FL
December 21, 2020*; 5:00 pm, CUSA.tv		Florida College	W 107–72	5–3	FAU Arena (225); Boca Raton, FL
January 5, 2021*; 4:00 pm		at James Madison	L 70–79	5–4	Atlantic Union Bank Center (250); Harrisonburg, VA
Conference USA regular season
January 8, 2021; 7:00 pm, ESPN+		at Old Dominion	L 67–71	5–5 (0–1)	Chartway Arena (250); Norfolk, VA
January 9, 2021; 7:00 pm, ESPN+		at Old Dominion	L 55–64	5–6 (0–2)	Chartway Arena (250); Norfolk, VA
January 14, 2021; 7:00 pm, ESPN+		at FIU	W 81–79	6–6 (1–2)	Ocean Bank Convocation Center (500); Miami, FL
January 15, 2021; 4:00 pm, CUSA.tv		FIU	W 107–63	7–6 (2–2)	FAU Arena (420); Boca Raton, FL
January 22, 2021; 7:00 pm, ESPN+		Charlotte	W 66–53 ^{OT}	8–6 (3–2)	FAU Arena (420); Boca Raton, FL
January 23, 2021; 4:00 pm, ESPN+		Charlotte	L 71–74	8–7 (3–3)	FAU Arena (328); Boca Raton, FL
February 12, 2021; 7:00 pm, ESPN+		at UTSA	L 80–84	8–8 (3–4)	Convocation Center (373); San Antonio, TX
February 13, 2021; 4:00 pm, ESPN+		at UTSA	L 75–86	8–9 (3–5)	Convocation Center (384); San Antonio, TX
February 21, 2021; 5:00 pm, ESPN+		UTEP	Postponed (Note: Game was postponed due to COVID-19 pandemic related issues.)		FAU Arena; Boca Raton, FL
February 22, 2021; 6:00 pm, ESPN+		UTEP	Postponed		FAU Arena; Boca Raton, FL
February 26, 2021; 8:00 pm, ESPN+		at Southern Miss	W 69–60	9–9 (4–5)	Reed Green Coliseum (1,200); Hattiesburg, MS
February 27, 2021; 5:00 pm, ESPN+		at Southern Miss	W 73–66	10–9 (5–5)	Reed Green Coliseum (1,200); Hattiesburg, MS
March 4, 2021; 6:00 pm		Middle Tennessee	W 80–50	11–9 (6–5)	FAU Arena (251); Boca Raton, FL
March 5, 2021; 6:00 pm		Middle Tennessee	W 63–54	12–9 (7–5)	FAU Arena (402); Boca Raton, FL
Conference USA tournament
March 10, 2021; 9:30 pm, ESPN+	(E4)	vs. (W5) UTEP; Second Round	W 76–70	13–9	Ford Center at The Star; Frisco, TX
March 11, 2021; 9:30 pm, ESPN+	(E4)	vs. (W1) Louisiana Tech; Quarterfinals	L 69–75	13–10	Ford Center at The Star; Frisco, TX
*Non-conference game. ^{#}Rankings from AP Poll. (#) Tournament seedings in parentheses. All times are in Eastern.
