= 2020–21 Southern Miss Golden Eagles basketball team =

American college basketball season

2020–21 Southern Miss Golden Eagles basketball
- Conference: Conference USA
- West Division
- Record: 8–17 (4–13 CUSA)
- Head coach: Jay Ladner (2nd season)
- Assistant coaches: Kyle Roane; Dalonte Hill; Clarence Weatherspoon
- Home arena: Reed Green Coliseum

2020–21 Conference USA men's basketball standings
	Conf.				Overall
Team	W		L	PCT	W		L	PCT
East
Western Kentucky	11	–	3	.786	21	–	8	.724
Old Dominion	11	–	5	.688	15	–	8	.652
Marshall	9	–	5	.643	15	–	7	.682
Florida Atlantic	7	–	5	.583	13	–	10	.565
Charlotte	5	–	11	.313	9	–	15	.375
Middle Tennessee	3	–	13	.188	5	–	18	.217
FIU	2	–	15	.118	9	–	17	.346
West
Louisiana Tech	12	–	4	.750	24	–	8	.750
UAB	13	–	5	.722	22	–	7	.759
North Texas †	9	–	5	.643	18	–	10	.643
UTSA	9	–	7	.563	15	–	11	.577
UTEP	8	–	8	.500	12	–	12	.500
Rice	6	–	10	.375	15	–	13	.536
Southern Miss	4	–	13	.235	8	–	17	.320
† 2021 C-USA Tournament winner

The 2020–21 Southern Miss Golden Eagles basketball team represented the University of Southern Mississippi during the 2020–21 NCAA Division I men's basketball season. The team was led by second-year head coach Jay Ladner, and played their home games at Reed Green Coliseum in Hattiesburg, Mississippi as members of Conference USA.

== Roster ==
2020–21 Southern Miss Golden Eagles men's basketball team
Players
Coaches

Pos.	#	Name	Height	Weight	Year	Previous school	Hometown
F	0	Tyler Morman	6 ft 8 in (2.03 m)	225 lb (102 kg)	RS Jr	Wyoming	Mableton, GA
F	1	Denijay Harris	6 ft 7 in (2.01 m)	215 lb (98 kg)	RS So	SW Mississippi CC	Columbus, MS
G/F	2	Justin Johnson	6 ft 6 in (1.98 m)	185 lb (84 kg)	Jr	South Georgia Tech	Fort Lauderdale, FL
G	4	Blake Roberts	6 ft 2 in (1.88 m)	185 lb (84 kg)	Fr	Oak Grove HS	Hattiesburg, MS
F	5	DeAndre Pinckney	6 ft 8 in (2.03 m)	225 lb (102 kg)	Jr	Broward College	Carol City, FL
G	10	Tae Hardy	6 ft 3 in (1.91 m)	175 lb (79 kg)	Jr	Pearl River CC	Ellenwood, GA
G	11	LaDavius Draine	6 ft 4 in (1.93 m)	210 lb (95 kg)	Sr	Calhoun City HS	Calhoun City, MS
F	14	Tyler Stevenson	6 ft 8 in (2.03 m)	225 lb (102 kg)	Jr	New Hope HS	Columbus, MS
G	15	Clay Weatherspoon	6 ft 2 in (1.88 m)	210 lb (95 kg)	RS Sr	Ridgeland HS	Ridgeland, MS
F	20	Javarzia Belton	6 ft 10 in (2.08 m)	275 lb (125 kg)	Fr	Moravian Prep	Calhoun Falls, SC
G	21	Jay Malone	6 ft 0 in (1.83 m)	167 lb (76 kg)	RS Jr	SW Mississippi CC	Meridian, MS
G	22	Jeffery Armstrong	6 ft 0 in (1.83 m)	175 lb (79 kg)	RS Fr	Massanutten Military Academy	Rainsville, AL
F	34	Artur Konontsuk	6 ft 8 in (2.03 m)	213 lb (97 kg)	So	Get Better Academy	Pärnu, Estonia
G	44	Mark Jaakson	6 ft 8 in (2.03 m)	210 lb (95 kg)	Fr	Get Better Academy	Tallinn, Estonia
G	55	Jaron Pierre Jr.	6 ft 5 in (1.96 m)	185 lb (84 kg)	Fr	St. Augustine HS	New Orleans, LA

Head coach

- Jay Ladner (Southern Miss)

Assistant coach(es)

- Kyle Roane (Southern Miss)
- Dalonte Hill (UNC Charlotte)
- Clarence Weatherspoon (Southern Miss)

Legend

- (C) Team captain
- (S) Suspended
- (I) Ineligible
- (W) Walk-on
- Injured
- Current redshirt

Roster
Last update: April 20, 2021

== Schedule and results ==
Date time, TV	Rank^{#}	Opponent^{#}	Result	Record	Site (attendance) city, state
Non-conference regular season
November 28, 2020*; 12:00 p.m.		vs. North Dakota State; MKE Classic	Canceled (Note: Game was canceled due to COVID-19 pandemic related issues.)		Klotsche Center; Milwaukee, WI
November 28, 2020*; 1:00 p.m.		at Jacksonville	L 51–66	0–1	Swisher Gymnasium (180); Jacksonville, FL
November 29, 2020*; 12:00 p.m.		at Milwaukee; MKE Classic	Canceled		Klotsche Center; Milwaukee, WI
December 2, 2020*; 7:00 p.m.		William Carey	W 80–53	1–1	Reed Green Coliseum; Hattiesburg, MS
December 5, 2020*		at Southern Illinois	Canceled (Note: Both teams mutually agree to cancel the game and postponed it to the 2021–22 season.)		Banterra Center; Carbondale, IL
December 9, 2020*; 7:00 p.m.		at Tulane	L 38–58	1–2	Devlin Fieldhouse (100); New Orleans, LA
December 12, 2020*; 2:00 p.m.		South Alabama	L 75–76	1–3	Reed Green Coliseum; Hattiesburg, MS
December 15, 2020*; 7:00 p.m.		at Lamar	W 66–63	2–3	Montagne Center (1,541); Beaumont, TX
December 19, 2020*; 2:00 p.m.		Louisiana–Monroe	W 60–47	3–3	Reed Green Coliseum; Hattiesburg, MS
December 28, 2020*; 2:00 p.m.		Loyola	W 74–54	4–3	Reed Green Coliseum; Hattiesburg, MS
CUSA regular season
January 1, 2021; 7:00 p.m.		UTEP	W 74–66 ^{OT}	5–3 (1–0)	Reed Green Coliseum (1,200); Hattiesburg, MS
January 2, 2021; 4:00 p.m.		UTEP	L 62–77	5–4 (1–1)	Reed Green Coliseum (1,200); Hattiesburg, MS
January 8, 2021; 6:30 p.m.		at UAB	L 60–72	5–5 (1–2)	Bartow Arena (925); Birmingham, AL
January 9, 2021; 4:00 p.m.		at UAB	L 58–62	5–6 (1–3)	Bartow Arena (932); Birmingham, AL
January 15, 2021; 7:00 p.m.		Middle Tennessee	W 84–54	6–6 (2–3)	Reed Green Coliseum (1,200); Hattiesburg, MS
January 16, 2021; 4:00 p.m.		Middle Tennessee	W 64–59	7–6 (3–3)	Reed Green Coliseum (1,200); Hattiesburg, MS
January 22, 2021; 6:00 p.m.		at UTSA	L 64–70	7–7 (3–4)	Convocation Center; San Antonio, TX
January 23, 2021; 3:00 p.m.		at UTSA	L 72–78	7–8 (3–5)	Convocation Center (362); San Antonio, TX
January 28, 2021; 6:00 p.m.		Louisiana Tech	L 63–76	7–9 (3–6)	Reed Green Coliseum (1,200); Hattiesburg, MS
January 30, 2021; 2:00 p.m.		at Louisiana Tech	L 62–65	7–10 (3–7)	Thomas Assembly Center (1,200); Ruston, LA
February 5, 2021; 7:00 p.m.		at Rice	L 62–88	7–11 (3–8)	Tudor Fieldhouse; Houston, TX
February 6, 2021; 4:00 p.m.		at Rice	L 68–76	7–12 (3–9)	Tudor Fieldhouse; Houston, TX
February 12, 2021; 7:00 p.m.		North Texas	L 49–65	7–13 (3–10)	Reed Green Coliseum (1,200); Hattiesburg, MS
February 13, 2021; 4:00 p.m.		North Texas	L 56–68	7–14 (3–11)	Reed Green Coliseum (1,200); Hattiesburg, MS
February 19, 2021; 6:00 p.m.		at FIU	W 85–72	8–14 (4–11)	Ocean Bank Convocation Center; Miami, FL
February 20, 2021; 1:00 p.m.		at FIU	Postponed (Note: Game was postponed due to COVID-19 pandemic related issues.)		Ocean Bank Convocation Center; Miami, FL
February 26, 2021; 7:00 p.m.		Florida Atlantic	L 60–69	8–15 (4–12)	Reed Green Coliseum (1,200); Hattiesburg, MS
February 27, 2021; 4:00 p.m.		Florida Atlantic	L 66–73	8–16 (4–13)	Reed Green Coliseum (1,200); Hattiesburg, MS
Conference USA tournament
March 9, 2021; 7:00 pm, ESPN+	(W7)	vs. (E6) Rice; Preliminary Round	L 52–61	8–17	Ford Center at The Star (283); Frisco, TX
*Non-conference game. ^{#}Rankings from AP Poll. (#) Tournament seedings in parentheses. All times are in Central.

== See also ==
- 2020–21 Southern Miss Lady Eagles basketball team
