= 2020–21 North Texas Mean Green men's basketball team =

American college basketball season

2020–21 North Texas Mean Green men's basketball
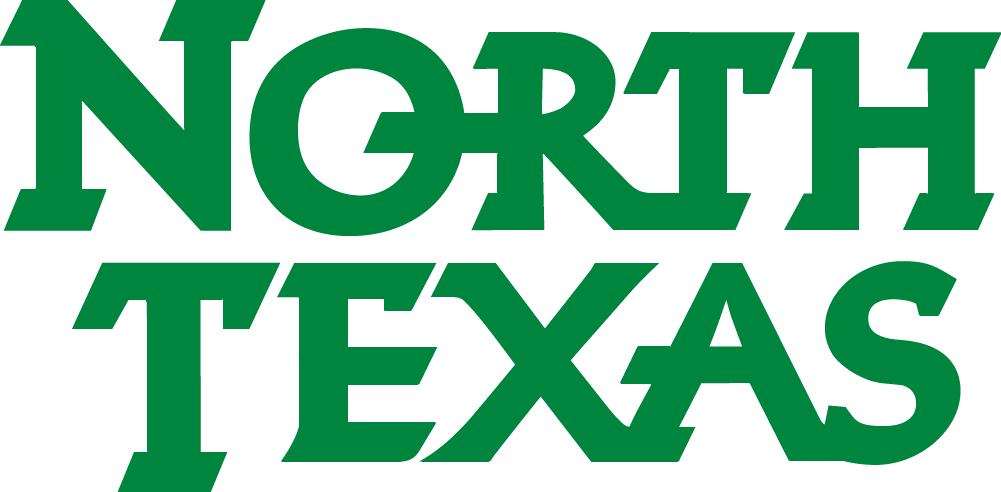

C-USA tournament champions

NCAA tournament, second round
- Conference: Conference USA
- West Division
- Record: 18–10 (9–5 C-USA)
- Head coach: Grant McCasland (4th season)
- Assistant coaches: Ross Hodge; Jareem Dowling; Matt Braeuer
- Home arena: UNT Coliseum

2020–21 Conference USA men's basketball standings
	Conf.				Overall
Team	W		L	PCT	W		L	PCT
East
Western Kentucky	11	–	3	.786	21	–	8	.724
Old Dominion	11	–	5	.688	15	–	8	.652
Marshall	9	–	5	.643	15	–	7	.682
Florida Atlantic	7	–	5	.583	13	–	10	.565
Charlotte	5	–	11	.313	9	–	15	.375
Middle Tennessee	3	–	13	.188	5	–	18	.217
FIU	2	–	15	.118	9	–	17	.346
West
Louisiana Tech	12	–	4	.750	24	–	8	.750
UAB	13	–	5	.722	22	–	7	.759
North Texas †	9	–	5	.643	18	–	10	.643
UTSA	9	–	7	.563	15	–	11	.577
UTEP	8	–	8	.500	12	–	12	.500
Rice	6	–	10	.375	15	–	13	.536
Southern Miss	4	–	13	.235	8	–	17	.320
† 2021 C-USA Tournament winner

The 2020–21 North Texas Mean Green men's basketball team represented the University of North Texas during the 2020–21 NCAA Division I men's basketball season. The team was led by fifth-year head coach Grant McCasland, and played their home games at UNT Coliseum in Denton, Texas as a member of the West division of Conference USA. In a season limited due to the ongoing COVID-19 pandemic, they finished the season 18–10, 9–5 to finish in third place in the division. They defeated Middle Tennessee, Old Dominion, Louisiana Tech, and Western Kentucky to win the C-USA tournament championship. As a result, they received the conference's automatic bid to the NCAA tournament as the No. 13 seed in the South region. There they upset No. 4-seeded Purdue in the first round for the school’s first ever NCAA tournament victory, before losing to No. 5-seeded Villanova in the second round.

== Previous season ==
The Mean Green finished the 2019–20 season 20–11, 14–4 in C-USA play to finish to win the regular season championship. Before postseason play could begin, the C-USA tournament and other postseason tournaments were canceled due to the COVID-19 pandemic.

== Roster ==
2020–21 North Texas Mean Green men's basketball team
Players
Coaches

Pos.	#	Name	Height	Weight	Year	Previous school	Hometown
G	0	James Reese	6 ft 4 in (1.93 m)	167 lb (76 kg)	Sr	AC Flora HS; Odessa College	Eastover, SC
G	1	Mardrez McBride	6 ft 2 in (1.88 m)	178 lb (81 kg)	Jr	Butler HS; USC Salkehatchie	Augusta, GA
G	2	Keith Barnes	6 ft 4 in (1.93 m)	200 lb (91 kg)	RS Fr	Faith Family Academy	St. Louis, MO
G	3	Javion Hamlet	6 ft 4 in (1.93 m)	193 lb (88 kg)	RS Sr	Whitehaven HS; NW Florida State	Memphis, TN
G	4	Jalen Jackson	5 ft 11 in (1.8 m)	177 lb (80 kg)	So	Wagner HS	San Antonio, TX
F	10	Jahmiah Simmons	6 ft 4 in (1.93 m)	220 lb (100 kg)	RS Sr	Pace HS; Arkansas State	St. Thomas, USVI
G	11	JJ Murray (W)	6 ft 1 in (1.85 m)	179 lb (81 kg)	RS Sr	Rowlett HS; Eastfield	Rowlett, TX
F	13	Thomas Bell	6 ft 6 in (1.98 m)	190 lb (86 kg)	Sr	Cahokia HS; Kaskaskia	East St. Louis, IL
G	15	Rubin Jones	6 ft 5 in (1.96 m)	184 lb (83 kg)	Fr	Yates HS	Houston, TX
G	22	Larry Wise	6 ft 5 in (1.96 m)	194 lb (88 kg)	RS So	Waxahachie HS	Waxahachie, TX
G	23	Mykell Robinson	6 ft 7 in (2.01 m)	205 lb (93 kg)	Fr	Sunrise Christian Academy	Houston, TX
F	24	Zachary Simmons	6 ft 10 in (2.08 m)	239 lb (108 kg)	Sr	Cedar Hill HS	Abilene, TX
F	33	Abou Ousmane	6 ft 10 in (2.08 m)	250 lb (113 kg)	Fr	Scotland Performance Institute	Brooklyn, NY
F	34	Terence Lewis II	6 ft 7 in (2.01 m)	208 lb (94 kg)	RS Jr	Combine Academy HS; New Mexico JC	Upper Marlboro, MD

Head coach

- Grant McCasland (Baylor)

Assistant coach(es)

- Ross Hodge (East Texas A&M)
- Jareem Dowling (Maryland Eastern Shore)
- Matt Braeuer (Wichita State)
- Nelson Haggerty (Baylor)
  (Director of Basketball Operations)

Legend

- (C) Team captain
- (S) Suspended
- (I) Ineligible
- (W) Walk-on
- Injured
- Current redshirt

Roster
Last update: February 1, 2021

== Schedule and results ==
Date time, TV	Rank^{#}	Opponent^{#}	Result	Record	Site (attendance) city, state
Non-conference regular season
November 26, 2020*; 7:00 p.m., YouTube Live		Mississippi Valley State	W 116–62	1–0	UNT Coliseum (1,206); Denton, TX
November 28, 2020*; 5:00 p.m., SECN+		vs. Arkansas	L 54–69	1–1	Bud Walton Arena (4,400); Fayetteville, AR
December 1, 2020*; 7:00 p.m., Youtube Live		Texas A&M–Commerce	Canceled (Note: Game was canceled due to COVID-19 pandemic related issues.)		UNT Coliseum; Denton, TX
December 4, 2020*; 7:00 p.m., SECN+		at Mississippi State	L 63–69	1–2	Humphrey Coliseum (1,877); Starkville, MS
December 11, 2020*; 2:00 p.m., ESPN+		at No. 11 West Virginia	L 50–62	1–3	WVU Coliseum (291); Morgantown, WV
December 15, 2020*; 7:00 p.m., YouTube Live		Arkansas–Pine Bluff	W 81–56	2–3	UNT Coliseum (1,211); Denton, TX
December 17, 2020*; 7:00 p.m., YouTube Live		Houston Baptist	W 85–55	3–3	UNT Coliseum (1,251); Denton, TX
December 19, 2020*; 11:00 a.m., SECN+		at LSU	Postponed (Note: Game was postponed due to COVID-19 pandemic related issues.)		Pete Maravich Assembly Center; Baton Rouge, LA
December 22, 2020*; 1:00 p.m., YouTube Live		LSU–Alexandria	W 110–78	4–3	UNT Coliseum (1,203); Denton, TX
January 2, 2021*; 6:30 p.m., ESPN+		at Loyola–Chicago	L 49–57	4–4	Joseph J. Gentile Arena; Chicago, IL
CUSA regular season
January 1, 2021; 7:00 p.m., ESPN+		UAB	Postponed		UNT Coliseum; Denton, TX
January 2, 2021; 4:00 p.m., ESPN+		UAB	Postponed		UNT Coliseum; Denton, TX
January 8, 2021; 6:00 p.m., ESPNU		at UTSA	W 77–70	5–4 (1–0)	Convocation Center (388); San Antonio, TX
January 9, 2021; 3:00 p.m.		at UTSA	L 69–77	5–5 (1–1)	Convocation Center (389); San Antonio, TX
January 15, 2021; 7:00 p.m., Stadium		UTEP	W 63–33	6–5 (2–1)	UNT Coliseum (1,369); Denton, TX
January 16, 2021; 3:00 p.m., Stadium		UTEP	W 74–65	7–5 (3–1)	UNT Coliseum (1,416); Denton, TX
January 22, 2021; 6:00 p.m., ESPN+		at Old Dominion	Postponed		Chartway Arena; Norfolk, VA
January 23, 2021; 6:00 p.m., ESPN+		at Old Dominion	Postponed		Chartway Arena; Norfolk, VA
January 29, 2021; 2:00 p.m., ESPN+		at Rice	W 79–74	8–5 (4–1)	Tudor Fieldhouse; Houston, TX
January 31, 2021; 3:00 p.m., ESPN+		Rice	W 79–53	9–5 (5–1)	UNT Coliseum (1,303); Denton, TX
February 5, 2021; 7:00 p.m., Stadium		Louisiana Tech	L 63–68	9–6 (5–2)	UNT Coliseum (1,535); Denton, TX
February 6, 2021; 1:00 p.m., Stadium		Louisiana Tech	W 57–55	10–6 (6–2)	UNT Coliseum (1,532); Denton, TX
February 12, 2021; 7:00 p.m., ESPN+		at Southern Miss	W 65–49	11–6 (7–2)	Reed Green Coliseum (1,200); Hattiesburg, MS
February 13, 2021; 4:00 p.m.		at Southern Miss	W 68–56	12–6 (8–2)	Reed Green Coliseum (1,200); Hattiesburg, MS
February 20, 2021; 4:00 p.m., CBSSN on Facebook		Western Kentucky	Postponed (Note: Game was postponed due to weather concerns.)		UNT Coliseum; Denton, TX
February 21, 2021; 1:00 p.m., CBSSN on Facebook		Western Kentucky	Postponed		UNT Coliseum; Denton, TX
February 26, 2021; 6:00 p.m., ESPNU		at Marshall	W 77–65	13–6 (9–2)	Cam Henderson Center (1,055); Huntington, WV
February 27, 2021; 1:00 p.m., Stadium		at Marshall	L 72–73	13–7 (9–3)	Cam Henderson Center (1,228); Huntington, WV
March 5, 2021; 7:00 p.m., ESPN+		UAB	L 51–65	13–8 (9–4)	UNT Coliseum (1,359); Denton, TX
March 6, 2021; 4:00 p.m., ESPN+		UAB	L 61–65	13–9 (9–5)	UNT Coliseum (1,450); Denton, TX
Conference USA tournament
March 10, 2021; 9:00 p.m., Stadium	(W3)	vs. (E6) Middle Tennessee; Second Round	W 76–56	14–9	Ford Center at The Star (856); Frisco, TX
March 11, 2021; 9:00 p.m., Stadium	(W3)	vs. (E2) Old Dominion; Quarterfinals	W 61–55	15–9	Ford Center at The Star (1,137); Frisco, TX
March 12, 2021; 3:00 p.m., CBSSN	(W3)	vs. (W1) Louisiana Tech; Semifinals	W 54–48	16–9	Ford Center at The Star (789); Frisco, TX
March 13, 2021; 8:00 p.m., CBSSN	(W3)	vs. (E1) Western Kentucky; Championship	W 61–57 ^{OT}	17–9	Ford Center at The Star (903); Frisco, TX
NCAA tournament
March 19, 2021; 7:25 pm, TNT	(13 S)	vs. (4 S) No. 20 Purdue; First Round	W 78–69 ^{OT}	18–9	Lucas Oil Stadium; Indianapolis, IN
March 21, 2021; 7:45 pm, TNT	(13 S)	vs. (5 S) No. 18 Villanova; Second Round	L 61–84	18–10	Bankers Life Fieldhouse; Indianapolis, IN
*Non-conference game. ^{#}Rankings from AP Poll. (#) Tournament seedings in parentheses. All times are in Central.

== See also ==
- 2020–21 North Texas Mean Green women's basketball team
