= 2020–21 UTEP Miners men's basketball team =

American college basketball season

2020–21 UTEP Miners men's basketball
- Conference: Conference USA
- West Division
- Record: 12–12 (8–8 CUSA)
- Head coach: Rodney Terry (3rd season)
- Assistant coaches: Kenton Paulino; Nick Matson; Arturo Ormond
- Home arena: Don Haskins Center

2020–21 Conference USA men's basketball standings
	Conf.				Overall
Team	W		L	PCT	W		L	PCT
East
Western Kentucky	11	–	3	.786	21	–	8	.724
Old Dominion	11	–	5	.688	15	–	8	.652
Marshall	9	–	5	.643	15	–	7	.682
Florida Atlantic	7	–	5	.583	13	–	10	.565
Charlotte	5	–	11	.313	9	–	15	.375
Middle Tennessee	3	–	13	.188	5	–	18	.217
FIU	2	–	15	.118	9	–	17	.346
West
Louisiana Tech	12	–	4	.750	24	–	8	.750
UAB	13	–	5	.722	22	–	7	.759
North Texas †	9	–	5	.643	18	–	10	.643
UTSA	9	–	7	.563	15	–	11	.577
UTEP	8	–	8	.500	12	–	12	.500
Rice	6	–	10	.375	15	–	13	.536
Southern Miss	4	–	13	.235	8	–	17	.320
† 2021 C-USA Tournament winner

The 2020–21 UTEP Miners men's basketball team represented the University of Texas at El Paso during the 2020–21 NCAA Division I men's basketball season. The team was led by third-year head coach Rodney Terry, and played their home games at Don Haskins Center in El Paso, Texas as members of Conference USA.

== Roster ==
2020–21 UTEP Miners men's basketball team
Players
Coaches

Pos.	#	Name	Height	Weight	Year	Previous school	Hometown
G	0	Souley Boum	6 ft 3 in (1.91 m)	165 lb (75 kg)	RS Jr	San Francisco	Oakland, California
F	1	Tydus Verhoeven	6 ft 9 in (2.06 m)	225 lb (102 kg)	RS Jr	Duquesne	Manteca, California
G	2	Christian Agnew	6 ft 2 in (1.88 m)	187 lb (85 kg)	Jr	North Alabama	Detroit, Michigan
G	3	Keonte Kennedy	6 ft 5 in (1.96 m)	185 lb (84 kg)	RS So	Xavier	Austin, Texas
F	4	Eric Vila	6 ft 11 in (2.11 m)	225 lb (102 kg)	RS Sr	Northwest Florida State College	Girona, Spain
G	5	Emmanuel White	6 ft 5 in (1.96 m)	178 lb (81 kg)	Jr	Coastal Bend College	Katy, Texas
F	11	Bryson Williams	6 ft 8 in (2.03 m)	230 lb (104 kg)	RS Sr	Fresno State	Fresno, California
F	12	Kristian Sjolund	6 ft 8 in (2.03 m)	206 lb (93 kg)	RS So	Georgia Tech	Kongsberg, Norway
G	13	Cam Clardy	6 ft 1 in (1.85 m)	183 lb (83 kg)	Fr	Bridgeland High School	Cypress, Texas
G	20	Vuk Vulikic	6 ft 4 in (1.93 m)	198 lb (90 kg)	Fr	KK Dynamic	Belgrade, Serbia
F	21	Ze'Rik Onyema	6 ft 8 in (2.03 m)	217 lb (98 kg)	Fr	John Jay High School	San Antonio, Texas
G	23	Adam Hess	6 ft 5 in (1.96 m)	195 lb (88 kg)	RS So	Salt Lake Community College	Westlake, California
G	24	Jamal Bieniemy	6 ft 5 in (1.96 m)	185 lb (84 kg)	Jr	Oklahoma	New Orleans, Louisiana
F	32	Efe Odigie	6 ft 9 in (2.06 m)	240 lb (109 kg)	Jr	Pro-Vision Academy	Houston, Texas
F	33	Gilles Dekoninck	6 ft 6 in (1.98 m)	213 lb (97 kg)	RS Jr	Fresno State	Diest, Belgium

Head coach

- Rodney Terry (St. Edward's)

Assistant coach(es)

- Kenton Paulino (Texas)
- Nick Matson (VMI)
- Arturo Ormond (Texas–Pan American)

Legend

- (C) Team captain
- (S) Suspended
- (I) Ineligible
- (W) Walk-on
- Injured
- Current redshirt

Roster
Last update: May 14, 2021

== Schedule and results ==
Date time, TV	Rank^{#}	Opponent^{#}	Result	Record	Site (attendance) city, state
Non-conference regular season
November 25, 2020*; 5:00 p.m.		UT Permian Basin	W 100–81	1–0	Don Haskins Center; El Paso, TX
December 3, 2020*; 6:00 p.m.		Arizona Christian	Canceled (Note: Game was canceled due to COVID-19 pandemic related issues.)		Don Haskins Center; El Paso, TX
December 5, 2020*; 6:00 p.m.		Sul Ross	W 84–65	2–0	Don Haskins Center; El Paso, TX
December 8, 2020*; 8:00 p.m.		at Saint Mary's	L 61–73	2–1	University Credit Union Pavilion; Moraga, CA
December 12, 2020*; 4:00 p.m.		at Arizona	L 61–69	2–2	McKale Center (150); Tucson, AZ
December 16, 2020*; 7:00 p.m.		at Arizona State	W 76–63	3–2	Desert Financial Arena; Tempe, AZ
December 20, 2020*; 4:00 p.m.		Benedictine University at Mesa	W 79–59	4–2	Don Haskins Center; El Paso, TX
December 28, 2020*; 7:00 p.m.		Our Lady of the Lake	Canceled		Don Haskins Center; El Paso, TX
CUSA regular season
January 1, 2021; 6:00 p.m.		at Southern Miss	L 66–74 ^{OT}	4–3 (0–1)	Reed Green Coliseum (1,200); Hattiesburg, MS
January 2, 2021; 3:00 p.m.		at Southern Miss	W 77–62	5–3 (1–1)	Reed Green Coliseum (1,200); Hattiesburg, MS
January 8, 2021; 7:00 p.m.		Rice	W 101–89	6–3 (2–1)	Don Haskins Center (459); El Paso, TX
January 9, 2021; 7:00 p.m.		Rice	L 68–71	6–4 (2–2)	Don Haskins Center (457); El Paso, TX
January 15, 2021; 6:00 p.m.		at North Texas	L 33–63	6–5 (2–3)	UNT Coliseum (1,369); Denton, TX
January 16, 2021; 2:00 p.m.		at North Texas	L 65–74	6–6 (2–4)	UNT Coliseum (1,416); Denton, TX
January 22, 2021; 7:00 p.m.		Louisiana Tech	W 82–74	7–6 (3–4)	Don Haskins Center (533); El Paso, TX
January 23, 2021; 6:00 p.m.		Louisiana Tech	L 55–73	7–7 (3–5)	Don Haskins Center (515); El Paso, TX
January 28, 2021; 5:00 p.m.		at UTSA	L 79–86	7–8 (3–6)	Convocation Center (470); San Antonio, TX
January 30, 2021; 7:00 p.m.		UTSA	W 69–51	8–8 (4–6)	Don Haskins Center (540); El Paso, TX
February 5, 2021; 5:30 p.m.		at UAB	L 51–63	8–9 (4–7)	Bartow Arena (1,138); Birmingham, AL
February 6, 2021; 3:00 p.m.		at UAB	L 60–75	8–10 (4–8)	Bartow Arena (1,058); Birmingham, AL
February 12, 2021; 7:00 p.m.		FIU	W 75–59	9–10 (5–8)	Don Haskins Center (457); El Paso, TX
February 13, 2021; 7:00 p.m.		FIU	W 77–68	10–10 (6–8)	Don Haskins Center (478); El Paso, TX
February 21, 2021; 3:00 p.m.		at Florida Atlantic	Canceled		FAU Arena; Boca Raton, FL
February 22, 2021; 4:00 p.m.		at Florida Atlantic	Canceled		FAU Arena; Boca Raton, FL
February 26, 2021; 7:00 p.m.		Charlotte	W 70–47	11–10 (7–8)	Don Haskins Center (499); El Paso, TX
February 27, 2021; 6:00 p.m.		Charlotte	W 77–62	12–10 (8–8)	Don Haskins Center (481); El Paso, TX
March 4, 2021*; 6:00 p.m.		at No. 13 Kansas	L 62–67	12–11	Allen Fieldhouse (2,600); Lawrence, KS
Conference USA tournament
March 10, 2021; 8:30 p.m., ESPN+	(W5)	vs. (E4) Florida Atlantic; Second Round	L 70–76	12–12	Ford Center at The Star; Frisco, TX
*Non-conference game. ^{#}Rankings from AP Poll. (#) Tournament seedings in parentheses. All times are in Mountain.

== See also ==
- 2020–21 UTEP Miners women's basketball team
