= 2020–21 Old Dominion Monarchs men's basketball team =

American college basketball season

2020–21 Old Dominion Monarchs men's basketball
- Conference: Conference USA
- East Division
- Record: 15–8 (11–5 C-USA)
- Head coach: Jeff Jones (8th season)
- Assistant coaches: John Richardson; Bryant Stith; Chris Kovensky
- Home arena: Chartway Arena

2020–21 Conference USA men's basketball standings
	Conf.				Overall
Team	W		L	PCT	W		L	PCT
East
Western Kentucky	11	–	3	.786	21	–	8	.724
Old Dominion	11	–	5	.688	15	–	8	.652
Marshall	9	–	5	.643	15	–	7	.682
Florida Atlantic	7	–	5	.583	13	–	10	.565
Charlotte	5	–	11	.313	9	–	15	.375
Middle Tennessee	3	–	13	.188	5	–	18	.217
FIU	2	–	15	.118	9	–	17	.346
West
Louisiana Tech	12	–	4	.750	24	–	8	.750
UAB	13	–	5	.722	22	–	7	.759
North Texas †	9	–	5	.643	18	–	10	.643
UTSA	9	–	7	.563	15	–	11	.577
UTEP	8	–	8	.500	12	–	12	.500
Rice	6	–	10	.375	15	–	13	.536
Southern Miss	4	–	13	.235	8	–	17	.320
† 2021 C-USA Tournament winner

The 2020–21 Old Dominion Monarchs men's basketball team represented Old Dominion University in the 2020–21 NCAA Division I men's basketball season. The Monarchs, led by eighth-year head coach Jeff Jones, played their home games at Chartway Arena in Norfolk, Virginia as members of the East Division of Conference USA.

== Previous season ==
The Monarchs finished the 2019–20 season 13–19, 9–9 in C-USA play to finish in a tie for seventh place. In the C-USA tournament, they were defeated in the first round by Florida Atlantic.

== Roster ==
2020–21 Old Dominion Monarchs men's basketball team
Players
Coaches

Pos.	#	Name	Height	Weight	Year	Previous school	Hometown
G	0	Mekhi Long	6 ft 7 in (2.01 m)	195 lb (88 kg)	So	Rhode Island	Bryans Road, Maryland
G	1	Jason Wade	6 ft 5 in (1.96 m)	205 lb (93 kg)	Jr	Trinity Episcopal School	Richmond, Virginia
G	2	Brady O'Connell	6 ft 7 in (2.01 m)	190 lb (86 kg)	Fr	Ravenscroft School	Milton, Georgia
G	3	Malik Curry	6 ft 1 in (1.85 m)	180 lb (82 kg)	Sr	Palm Beach State	Wilmington, Delaware
G	10	Xavier Green	6 ft 6 in (1.98 m)	200 lb (91 kg)	RS Sr	Williamsburg Christian Academy	Williamsburg, Virginia
G	11	A.J. Oliver II	6 ft 5 in (1.96 m)	190 lb (86 kg)	RS Jr	Clemson	Birmingham, Alabama
G	12	Jaylin Hunter	5 ft 11 in (1.8 m)	185 lb (84 kg)	So	East Catholic High School	Manchester, Connecticut
F	13	John Shanu II	6 ft 10 in (2.08 m)	220 lb (100 kg)	Fr	Sam Houston High School	Houston, Texas
F	15	Joe Reece	6 ft 8 in (2.03 m)	200 lb (91 kg)	Jr	East St. Louis High School	St. Louis, Missouri
F	21	Alfis Pilavios	6 ft 5 in (1.96 m)	200 lb (91 kg)	RS Jr	Moraitis School	Athens, Greece
F	22	Kalu Ezikpe	6 ft 8 in (2.03 m)	235 lb (107 kg)	Jr	Discovery High School	Lawrenceville, Georgia
F	23	Austin Trice	6 ft 7 in (2.01 m)	235 lb (107 kg)	Sr	Kansas State	Chicago, Illinois
G	25	David Strother	6 ft 2 in (1.88 m)	175 lb (79 kg)	Sr	UNC Pembroke	Lumberton, North Carolina

Head coach

- Jeff Jones (Virginia '82)

Assistant coach(es)

- John Richardson (Elizabeth City State '95)
- Bryant Stith (Virginia '92)
- Chris Kovensky (Old Dominion '11)

Legend

- (C) Team captain
- (S) Suspended
- (I) Ineligible
- (W) Walk-on
- Injured
- Current redshirt

Roster
Last update: January 31, 2021

== Schedule and results ==
Date time, TV	Rank^{#}	Opponent^{#}	Result	Record	High points	High rebounds	High assists	Site (attendance) city, state
Non-conference regular season
November 25, 2020*; 2:00 pm, BTN+		at Maryland	L 67–85	0–1	19 – Ezikpe	13 – Ezikpe	3 – Tied	Xfinity Center; College Park, MD
November 28, 2020*; 7:00 pm, ODUSports.com		William & Mary; Rivalry	W 86–78	1–1	24 – Curry	6 – Ezikpe	6 – Curry	Chartway Arena (250); Norfolk, VA
December 2, 2020*; 8:00 pm, WGNT		at Norfolk State; Rivalry	W 80–66	2–1	17 – Tied	10 – Trice	5 – Curry	Joseph G. Echols Memorial Hall (250); Norfolk, VA
December 7, 2020*; 7:00 pm, NBCSW+		at James Madison	Canceled					Atlantic Union Bank Center; Harrisonburg, VA
December 12, 2020*; 5:00 pm, NBCSN		at VCU; Rivalry	L 54–77	2–2	12 – Tied	8 – Trice	4 – Curry	Siegel Center (250); Richmond, VA
December 13, 2020*; 5:00 pm		vs. George Mason	Canceled					Siegel Center; Richmond, VA
December 20, 2020*; 2:00 pm, ODUSports.com		Northeastern	W 66–62	3–2	17 – Ezikpe	8 – Ezikpe	8 – Curry	Chartway Arena (250); Norfolk, VA
December 22, 2020*; 7:00 pm, ODUSports.com		Virginia Wesleyan	W 77–57	4–2	27 – Trice	12 – Trice	8 – Green	Chartway Arena (250); Norfolk, VA
C-USA regular season
January 1, 2021; 7:00 pm, ESPN+		at FIU	L 67–82	4–3 (0–1)	15 – Curry	10 – Trice	6 – Curry	Ocean Bank Convocation Center (175); Miami, FL
January 2, 2021; 3:00 pm, ESPN+		at FIU	W 71–66	5–3 (1–1)	27 – Curry	6 – Ezikpe	3 – Green	Ocean Bank Convocation Center (149); Miami, FL
January 8, 2021; 7:00 pm, ESPN+		Florida Atlantic	W 71–67	6–3 (2–1)	17 – Trice	8 – Reece	4 – Tied	Chartway Arena (250); Norfolk, VA
January 9, 2021; 7:00 pm, ESPN+		Florida Atlantic	W 64–55	7–3 (3–1)	17 – Oliver II	9 – Reece	5 – Hunter	Chartway Arena (250); Norfolk, VA
January 15, 2021; 3:00 pm, ESPN+		at Rice	L 59–69	7–4 (3–2)	18 – Curry	7 – Tied	3 – Tied	Tudor Fieldhouse; Houston, TX
January 16, 2021; 2:00 pm, ESPN+		at Rice	W 61–58	8–4 (4–2)	20 – Curry	9 – Trice	2 – Tied	Tudor Fieldhouse; Houston, TX
January 22, 2021; 7:00 pm, ESPN+		North Texas	Postponed					Chartway Arena; Norfolk, VA
January 23, 2021; 7:00 pm, ESPN+		North Texas	Postponed					Chartway Arena; Norfolk, VA
January 29, 2021; 8:00 pm, CBSSN on Facebook		at Western Kentucky	Postponed					E. A. Diddle Arena; Bowling Green, KY
January 30, 2021; 5:00 pm, CBSSN on Facebook		at Western Kentucky	Postponed					E. A. Diddle Arena; Bowling Green, KY
February 5, 2021; 7:00 pm, ESPN+		Marshall	W 82–81	9–4 (5–2)	20 – Trice	13 – Trice	5 – Green	Chartway Arena (250); Norfolk, VA
February 6, 2021; 7:00 pm, ESPN+		Marshall	L 67–87	9–5 (5–3)	16 – Trice	9 – Long	6 – Hunter	Chartway Arena (250); Norfolk, VA
February 10, 2021; 6:00 pm, ESPN+		at Charlotte	W 78–76	10–5 (6–3)	22 – Ezikpe	6 – Reece	5 – Curry	Dale F. Halton Arena; Charlotte, NC
February 13, 2021; 4:00 pm, ESPN+		Charlotte	W 64–45	11–5 (7–3)	13 – Ezikpe	8 – Green	4 – Curry	Chartway Arena (250); Norfolk, VA
February 19, 2021; 7:30 pm, Stadium		at UAB	L 69–76	11–6 (7–4)	17 – Ezikpe	8 – Ezikpe	3 – Tied	Bartow Arena (1,024); Birmingham, AL
February 20, 2021; 4:00 pm, Stadium		at UAB	W 65–58	12–6 (8–4)	16 – Green	10 – Ezikpe	5 – Curry	Bartow Arena (1,028); Birmingham, AL
February 26, 2021; 7:00 pm, ESPN+		Middle Tennessee	W 67–61	13–6 (9–4)	14 – Ezikpe	13 – Ezikpe	4 – Curry	Chartway Arena (250); Norfolk, VA
February 27, 2021; 7:00 pm, ESPN+		Middle Tennessee	W 73–60	14–6 (10–4)	17 – Hunter	8 – Trice	6 – Hunter	Chartway Arena (250); Norfolk, VA
March 5, 2021; 8:00 pm, CBS on Facebook		at Western Kentucky	W 71–69	15–6 (11–4)	25 – Curry	7 – Tied	2 – Tied	E. A. Diddle Arena; Bowling Green, KY
March 6, 2021; 4:00 pm, CBS on Facebook		at Western Kentucky	L 57–60	15–7 (11–5)	23 – Curry	9 – Ezikpe	4 – Curry	E. A. Diddle Arena; Bowling Green, KY
Conference USA tournament
March 11, 2021; 10:00 pm, Stadium	(E2)	vs. (W3) North Texas; Quarterfinals	L 55–61	15–8	17 – Curry	5 – Long	2 – Curry	Ford Center at The Star; Frisco, TX
*Non-conference game. ^{#}Rankings from AP Poll. (#) Tournament seedings in parentheses. All times are in Eastern.
