= 2020–21 FIU Panthers men's basketball team =

American college basketball season

2020–21 FIU Panthers men's basketball
- Conference: Conference USA
- East Division
- Record: 9–17 (2–15 C-USA)
- Head coach: Jeremy Ballard (3rd season)
- Associate head coach: David Cason
- Assistant coaches: Jesse Bopp; Joey Rodriguez
- Home arena: Ocean Bank Convocation Center

2020–21 Conference USA men's basketball standings
	Conf.				Overall
Team	W		L	PCT	W		L	PCT
East
Western Kentucky	11	–	3	.786	21	–	8	.724
Old Dominion	11	–	5	.688	15	–	8	.652
Marshall	9	–	5	.643	15	–	7	.682
Florida Atlantic	7	–	5	.583	13	–	10	.565
Charlotte	5	–	11	.313	9	–	15	.375
Middle Tennessee	3	–	13	.188	5	–	18	.217
FIU	2	–	15	.118	9	–	17	.346
West
Louisiana Tech	12	–	4	.750	24	–	8	.750
UAB	13	–	5	.722	22	–	7	.759
North Texas †	9	–	5	.643	18	–	10	.643
UTSA	9	–	7	.563	15	–	11	.577
UTEP	8	–	8	.500	12	–	12	.500
Rice	6	–	10	.375	15	–	13	.536
Southern Miss	4	–	13	.235	8	–	17	.320
† 2021 C-USA Tournament winner

The 2020–21 FIU Panthers men's basketball team represented Florida International University in the 2020–21 NCAA Division I men's basketball season. The Panthers, led by third-year head coach Jeremy Ballard, played their home games at Ocean Bank Convocation Center in Miami, Florida as members of the East Division of Conference USA (C-USA).

== Previous season ==
The Panthers finished the 2019–20 season 19–13, 9–9 in C-USA play, to finish in fifth place. They defeated Rice in the first round of the C-USA tournament and were set to face Charlotte in the quarterfinals before the remainder of the tournament was canceled amid the COVID-19 pandemic.

== Roster ==
2020–21 FIU Panthers men's basketball team
Players
Coaches

Pos.	#	Name	Height	Weight	Year	Previous school	Hometown
F	0	Dimon Carrigan	6 ft 9 in (2.06 m)	215 lb (98 kg)	Sr	Cambridge Rindge and Latin School; Odessa CC	Boston, MA
G	1	Isaiah Banks	6 ft 5 in (1.96 m)	180 lb (82 kg)	Sr	Heritage HS	Conyers, GA
G	2	DJ Mitchell	6 ft 4 in (1.93 m)	190 lb (86 kg)	Jr	Notre Dame Prep; Hutchinson CC	Washington, D.C.
G	3	Javaunte Hawkins	5 ft 11 in (1.8 m)	160 lb (73 kg)	So	Lee's Summit North HS; Butler CC	Lee's Summit, MO
G/F	4	Eric Lovett	6 ft 5 in (1.96 m)	200 lb (91 kg)	Sr	Jonesboro HS; Missouri State–West Plains	Jonesboro, GA
G	5	Antonio Daye, Jr.	6 ft 3 in (1.91 m)	188 lb (85 kg)	Jr	Fort Lauderdale HS	Durham, NC
F	10	Rashad Davis	6 ft 4 in (1.93 m)	205 lb (93 kg)	RS Sr	Sunrise Christian School	Nassau, Bahamas
G	11	Tevin Brewer	5 ft 8 in (1.73 m)	160 lb (73 kg)	RS Jr	Northside HS; Coffeyville CC	Fort Smith, AR
G/F	12	Dante Wilcox	6 ft 6 in (1.98 m)	220 lb (100 kg)	RS Fr	Oxbridge Academy	West Palm Beach, FL
F	15	James Ametepe	6 ft 5 in (1.96 m)	210 lb (95 kg)	So	Westwood Christian School	Accra, Ghana
F	20	Bernie Andre	6 ft 6 in (1.98 m)	210 lb (95 kg)	Sr	Norland HS; Vermont	North Miami Beach, FL
G	21	Jonathan Nunez	5 ft 11 in (1.8 m)	180 lb (82 kg)	So	Doral Academy Prep	Miami, FL
G	23	Petar Krivokapic	6 ft 4 in (1.93 m)	200 lb (91 kg)	Fr	Miami Prep School	Budva, Montenegro
F	35	Anthony Mason	6 ft 10 in (2.08 m)	225 lb (102 kg)	Jr	Robert Morgan	Decatur, AL
F	50	Devon Andrews	6 ft 6 in (1.98 m)	190 lb (86 kg)	RS Sr	Austin HS; NW FL State	Lorain, OH
G	55	Cameron Corcoran	6 ft 1 in (1.85 m)	170 lb (77 kg)	RS Jr	Orlando Christian Prep; Little Rock	Orlando, FL

Head coach

- Jeremy Ballard (Colgate)

Assistant coach(es)

- David Cason (Illinois State)
- Jesse Bopp (Plymouth State)
- Joey Rodriguez (VCU)

Legend

- (C) Team captain
- (S) Suspended
- (I) Ineligible
- (W) Walk-on
- Injured
- Current redshirt

Roster
Last update: January 6, 2021

== Schedule and results ==
Date time, TV	Rank^{#}	Opponent^{#}	Result	Record	Site (attendance) city, state
Regular season
November 25, 2020*; 7:00 pm, CUSA.tv		Flagler	W 85–81	1–0	Ocean Bank Convocation Center (242); Miami, FL
November 27, 2020*; 2:00 pm, CUSA.tv		Flagler	W 82–75	2–0	Ocean Bank Convocation Center (103); Miami, FL
December 1, 2020*; 7:00 pm, CUSA.tv		Central Michigan	W 96–76	3–0	Ocean Bank Convocation Center (351); Miami, FL
December 4, 2020*; 7:00 pm, CUSA.tv		Jacksonville State	W 74–70	4–0	Ocean Bank Convocation Center (260); Miami, FL
December 12, 2020*; 5:00 pm, ESPN+		at North Florida	L 77–80	4–1	UNF Arena (536); Jacksonville, FL
December 16, 2020*; 7:00 pm, ESPN+		at Florida Gulf Coast	W 85–69	5–1	Alico Arena (797); Fort Myers, FL
December 19, 2020*; 7:00 pm, CUSA.tv		Georgia Southern	L 99–103 ^{2OT}	5–2	Ocean Bank Convocation Center (172); Miami, FL
December 21, 2020*; 7:00 pm, CUSA.tv		Carver	W 111–34	6–2	Ocean Bank Convocation Center (32); Miami, FL
January 1, 2021; 7:00 pm, ESPN+		Old Dominion	W 82–67	7–2 (1–0)	Ocean Bank Convocation Center (175); Miami, FL
January 2, 2021; 3:00 pm, ESPN+		Old Dominion	L 66–71	7–3 (1–1)	Ocean Bank Convocation Center (149); Miami, FL
January 8, 2021; 7:00 pm, ESPN+		at Middle Tennessee	W 68–55	8–3 (2–1)	Murphy Center (100); Murfreesboro, TN
January 9, 2021; 5:00 pm, ESPN+		at Middle Tennessee	L 56–67	8–4 (2–2)	Murphy Center (100); Murfreesboro, TN
January 14, 2021; 7:00 pm, ESPN+		Florida Atlantic	L 79–81	8–5 (2–3)	Ocean Bank Convocation Center (500); Miami, FL
January 16, 2021; 4:00 pm, CUSA.tv		at Florida Atlantic	L 63–107	8–6 (2–4)	FAU Arena (420); Boca Raton, FL
January 22, 2021; 7:00 pm, ESPN+		Marshall	L 66–79	8–7 (2–5)	Ocean Bank Convocation Center (308); Miami, FL
January 23, 2021; 2:00 pm, Stadium		Marshall	L 72–89	8–8 (2–6)	Ocean Bank Convocation Center (128); Miami, FL
January 29, 2021; 6:00 pm, ESPN+		at Charlotte	L 55–63 ^{OT}	8–9 (2–7)	Halton Arena; Charlotte, NC
January 30, 2021; 4:00 pm, ESPN+		at Charlotte	L 65–68	8–10 (2–8)	Halton Arena; Charlotte, NC
February 1, 2020*; 7:00 pm, ESPN+		Florida Memorial	W 90–74	9–10	Ocean Bank Convocation Center (204); Miami, FL
February 5, 2021; 7:00 pm, ESPN+		UTSA	L 80–87	9–11 (2–9)	Ocean Bank Convocation Center (194); Miami, FL
February 6, 2021; 3:00 pm, ESPN+		UTSA	L 47–90	9–12 (2–10)	Ocean Bank Convocation Center (147); Miami, FL
February 12, 2021; 9:00 pm, ESPN+		at UTEP	L 75–79	9–13 (2–11)	Don Haskins Center (457); El Paso, TX
February 13, 2021; 9:00 pm, ESPN+		at UTEP	L 68–77	9–14 (2–12)	Don Haskins Center (478); El Paso, TX
February 19, 2021; 7:00 pm, ESPN+		Southern Miss	L 72–85	9–15 (2–13)	Ocean Bank Convocation Center; Miami, FL
February 20, 2021; 2:00 pm, ESPN+		Southern Miss	Postponed		Ocean Bank Convocation Center; Miami, FL
February 28, 2021; 3:00 pm, ESPN+		at Western Kentucky	L 58–91	9–16 (2–14)	E. A. Diddle Arena (1,117); Bowling Green, KY
March 1, 2021; 1:00 pm, ESPN+		at Western Kentucky	L 59–71	9–17 (2–15)	E. A. Diddle Arena (833); Bowling Green, KY
Conference USA tournament
March 9, 2021; 8:30 pm, ESPN+	(E7)	vs. (E6) Middle Tennessee; Preliminary round	Cancelled		Ford Center at The Star; Frisco, TX
*Non-conference game. ^{#}Rankings from AP poll. (#) Tournament seedings in parentheses. All times are in Eastern.
