= Javion Hamlet =

American basketball player

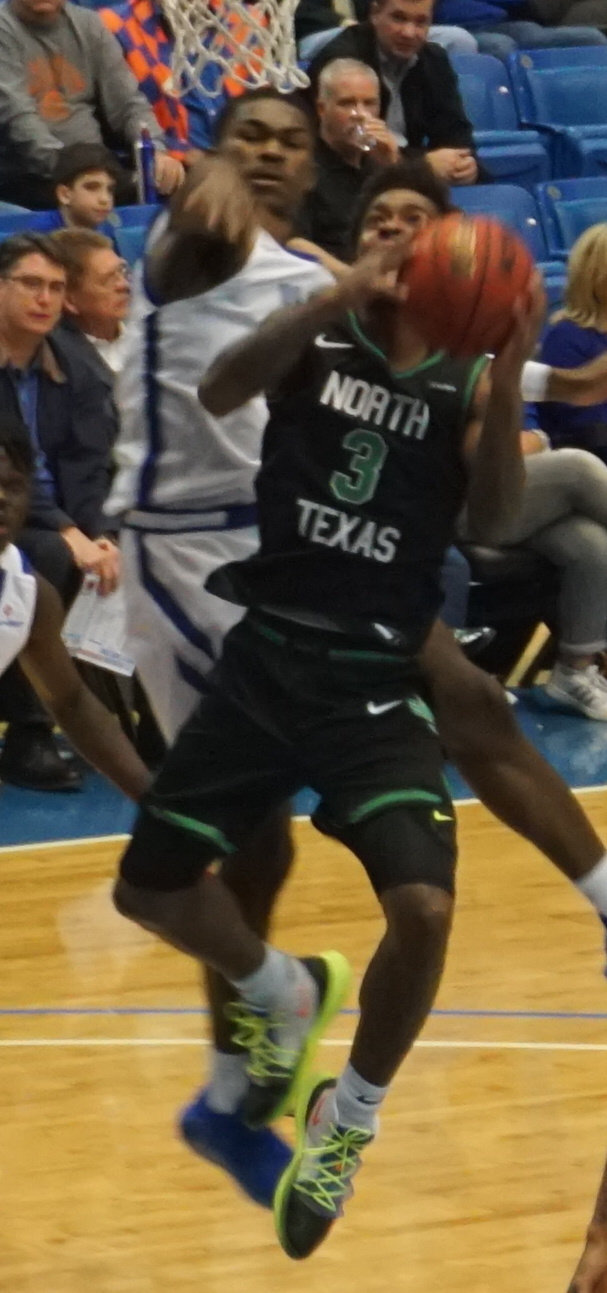
- Hamlet with North Texas in 2019

No. 3 – Fujian Sturgeons
- Position: Point guard
- League: CBA

Personal information
- Born: April 28, 1998 (age 28) Memphis, Tennessee, U.S.
- Listed height: 6 ft 4 in (1.93 m)
- Listed weight: 193 lb (88 kg)

Career information
- High school: Whitehaven (Memphis, Tennessee)
- College: Motlow State CC (2016–2017); Northwest Florida State (2018–2019); North Texas (2019–2021)
- NBA draft: 2021: undrafted
- Playing career: 2021–present

Career history
- 2021: ALM Évreux
- 2022: Texas Legends
- 2022–2023: Newcastle Eagles
- 2023: Hefei Storm
- 2023–2026: Tianjin Pioneers
- 2024: Wuhan Kunpeng
- 2025: Guangxi Rhinos
- 2026–present: Fujian Sturgeons

Career highlights
- Conference USA Player of the Year (2020); 2× First-team All-Conference USA (2020, 2021); C-USA tournament MVP (2021)

Javion Lamarcus Hamlet (born April 28, 1998) is an American professional basketball player for the Fujian Sturgeons of the Chinese Basketball Association (CBA). He played college basketball for the Motlow State CC Bucks, the Northwest Florida State Raiders, and the North Texas Mean Green.

== Early life ==
Hamlet grew up in Memphis, Tennessee and began playing basketball at the age of five. He attended Whitehaven High School. He was lightly recruited in high school, with his only offer coming from Division II LeMoyne-Owen College. His father wanted him to attend LeMoyne-Owen and he was close to signing before he received an offer from Motlow State Community College.

== College career ==
Hamlet began his college career at Motlow State Community College. He averaged 15.6 points and 8.4 assists per game and was named the MVP of the Tennessee Junior and Community College Athletic Association. He transferred to Buffalo after the end of the season. He left Buffalo only a few weeks after arriving and eventually transferred to Northwest Florida State College. He averaged 17.8 points and 6.6 assists per game for the Raiders as the team went to the NJCAA tournament elite eight. Following the end of the season Hamlet committed to continue his college career at North Texas over offers from SMU, Arkansas, Gonzaga, Temple, St. John's and Loyola (Illinois).

Hamlet became an immediate starter for the Mean Green. He was named first team All-Conference USA and the Conference USA Men's Basketball Player of the Year at the end of his junior season, leading the conference in assists and scoring in league play. He averaged 14.6 points and 4.7 assists per game. He led the Mean Green to two consecutive Conference USA Championships, he also led them to their first NCAA Tournament victory in program history.

== Professional career ==
On August 26, 2021, Hamlet signed his first professional contract with Bnei Herzliya of the Israeli Basketball Premier League. He did not play a game for the team.

=== ALM Évreux (2021) ===
On November 24, 2021, Hamlet signed with ALM Évreux Basket of the LNB Pro B.

=== Texas Legends (2022) ===
On January 5, 2022, Hamlet signed with the Texas Legends of the NBA G League. He was then later waived on February 27, 2022.

=== China (2023–present) ===
Hamlet played 19 games for Hefei Storm in 2023 National Basketball League (NBL) season. He joined Tianjin Pioneers for 2023–24 Chinese Basketball Association (CBA) season. In 2024 NBL season, he played 26 games for Wuhan Kunpeng. He rejoined Tianjin Pioneers for 2024–25 CBA season.

== Career statistics ==
Legend
| GP | Games played | GS | Games started | MPG | Minutes per game |
| FG% | Field goal percentage | 3P% | 3-point field goal percentage | FT% | Free throw percentage |
| RPG | Rebounds per game | APG | Assists per game | SPG | Steals per game |
| BPG | Blocks per game | PPG | Points per game | **Bold** | Career high |

=== College ===
==== NCAA Division I ====
| Year | Team | GP | GS | MPG | FG% | 3P% | FT% | RPG | APG | SPG | BPG | PPG |
|---|---|---|---|---|---|---|---|---|---|---|---|---|
| 2019–20 | North Texas | **31** | **31** | 30.4 | **.492** | **.419** | .873 | 3.0 | **4.7** | **.7** | .0 | 14.6 |
| 2020–21 | North Texas | 28 | 28 | **33.0** | .436 | .377 | **.883** | **3.8** | 4.5 | .5 | .0 | **15.7** |
| Career | | 59 | 59 | 31.6 | .462 | .396 | .878 | 3.4 | 4.6 | .6 | .0 | 15.1 |

==== JUCO ====
| Year | Team | GP | GS | MPG | FG% | 3P% | FT% | RPG | APG | SPG | BPG | PPG |
|---|---|---|---|---|---|---|---|---|---|---|---|---|
| 2016–17 | Motlow State CC | **36** | **34** | 26.1 | .554 | .345 | .783 | 2.1 | **8.4** | **1.4** | .0 | 15.6 |
| 2018–19 | Northwest Florida State | 33 | 33 | **31.6** | **.566** | **.448** | **.838** | **3.1** | 6.6 | 1.0 | **.1** | **17.8** |
| Career | | 69 | 67 | 28.8 | .560 | .397 | .811 | 2.6 | 7.5 | 1.2 | .1 | 16.7 |

== Personal life ==
Hamlet's cousin, Jamie Ross, is a former assistant basketball coach.
