= 2021–22 Conference USA men's basketball season =

- League: NCAA Division I
- Sport: Basketball
- Teams: 14
- TV partner(s): CBS Sports Network, Stadium, ESPNU, ESPN+

2021–22 NCAA Division I men's basketball season
- Season MVP: Jordan Walker

Tournament

Basketball seasons
- ← 2020–21 2022–23 →

2021–22 Conference USA men's basketball standings
	Conf.				Overall
Team	W		L	PCT	W		L	PCT
East
Middle Tennessee	13	–	5	.722	26	–	11	.703
Western Kentucky	11	–	7	.611	19	–	13	.594
Florida Atlantic	11	–	7	.611	19	–	15	.559
Charlotte	10	–	8	.556	17	–	14	.548
Old Dominion	8	–	10	.444	13	–	19	.406
FIU	5	–	13	.278	15	–	17	.469
Marshall	4	–	14	.222	12	–	21	.364
West
North Texas	16	–	2	.889	25	–	7	.781
UAB †	14	–	4	.778	27	–	8	.771
Louisiana Tech	12	–	6	.667	24	–	10	.706
UTEP	11	–	7	.611	20	–	14	.588
Rice	7	–	11	.389	16	–	17	.485
UTSA	3	–	15	.167	10	–	22	.313
Southern Miss	1	–	17	.056	7	–	26	.212
† 2022 C-USA Tournament winner

The 2021–22 Conference USA men's basketball season began with practices in October 2021, followed by the start of the 2021–22 NCAA Division I men's basketball season in November. Conference play starts in late December 2021 and will end in March 2022, after which all 14 member teams will participate in the 2022 Conference USA tournament at The Ford Center at The Star in Frisco, Texas. The tournament champion is guaranteed a selection to the 2022 NCAA tournament.

== Preseason ==
UAB was picked as a narrow favorite to finish first in Conference USA by a poll of the league's 14 head coaches.

=== Preseason Poll ===
1.	UAB (8)
2.	Louisiana Tech (6)
3.	WKU
4.	Marshall
5.	Old Dominion
6.	North Texas
7.	Charlotte
8.	Rice
9.	Florida Atlantic
10.	UTEP
11.	UTSA
12.	Southern Miss
13.	FIU
14.	Middle Tennessee

() first place votes

=== Preseason All-Conference teams ===
Media
Jahmir Young Charlotte
Taevion Kinsey Marshall
Kenneth Lofton Jr. Louisiana Tech
Josh Anderson WKU
Quincy Olivari Rice
Tyler Stevenson Southern Miss
Tavin Lovan UAB
Souley Boum UTEP
Kalu Ezikpe Old Dominion
Isaiah Crawford Louisiana Tech

== Head coaches ==
=== Coaching changes ===
Rodney Terry resigned as head coach of UTEP after three seasons to accept an assistant coaching position at Texas.Joe Golding was then hired as the new head coach of the Miners.

=== Coaches ===
Team	Head coach	Previous job	Year at school	Overall record	C-USA record	C-USA championships	NCAA Tournaments
Charlotte	Ron Sanchez	Virginia (asst.)	4	33-50	20-32	0	0
FIU	Jeremy Ballard	VCU (asst.)	4	48-44	21-32	0	0
Florida Atlantic	Dusty May	Florida (asst.)	4	47-41	23-25	0	0
Louisiana Tech	Eric Konkol	Miami (asst.)	7	129–65	67–39	0	0
Marshall	Dan D'Antoni	Los Angeles Lakers (asst.)	8	128-99	71-51	1	1
Middle Tennessee	Nick McDevitt	UNC Asheville	4	24-60	15-36	0	0
North Texas	Grant McCasland	Arkansas State	5	78-51	39-29	1	0
Old Dominion	Jeff Jones	American	9	167-92	93-45	1	1
Rice	Scott Pera	Rice (asst.)	5	50-73	25-44	0	0
Southern Miss	Jay Ladner	Southeastern Louisiana	3	17-39	9-26	0	0
UAB	Andy Kennedy	Ole Miss	2	22-7	13-5	0	0
UTEP	Joe Golding	Abilene Christian	2	0-0	0-0	0	0
UTSA	Steve Henson	Oklahoma (asst.)	6	79-79	46-42	0	0
WKU	Rick Stansbury	Texas A&M (asst.)	6	103-60	58-28	0	0

Notes:

- All records, appearances, titles, etc. are from time with current school only.
- Year at school includes 2021–22 season.
- Overall and C-USA records are from time at current school and are through the end of the 2020–21 season.

== Regular season ==
=== Conference matrix ===
	Charlotte	FIU	Florida Atlantic	Louisiana Tech	Marshall	Middle Tennessee	North Texas	Old Dominion	Rice	Southern Miss	UAB	UTEP	UTSA	WKU	
vs. Charlotte	–	0–0	0–0	0–0	0–0	0–0	0–0	0–0	0–0	0–0	0–0	0–0	0–0	0–0	0–0
vs. FIU	0–0	–	0–0	0–0	0–0	0–0	0–0	0–0	0–0	0–0	0–0	0–0	0–0	0–0	0–0
vs. Florida Atlantic	0–0	0–0	–	0–0	0–0	0–0	0–0	0–0	0–0	0–0	0–0	0–0	0–0	0–0	0–0
vs. Louisiana Tech	0–0	0–0	0–0	–	0–0	0–0	0–0	0–0	0–0	0–0	0–0	0–0	0–0	0–0	0–0
vs. Marshall	0–0	0–0	0–0	0–0	–	0–0	0–0	0–0	0–0	0–0	0–0	0–0	0–0	0–0	0–0
vs. Middle Tennessee	0–0	0–0	0–0	0–0	0–0	–	0–0	0–0	0–0	0–0	0–0	0–0	0–0	0–0	0–0
vs. North Texas	0–0	0–0	0–0	0–0	0–0	0–0	–	0–0	0–0	0–0	0–0	0–0	0–0	0–0	0–0
vs. Old Dominion	0–0	0–0	0–0	0–0	0–0	0–0	0–0	–	0–0	0–0	0–0	0–0	0–0	0–0	0–0
vs. Rice	0–0	0–0	0–0	0–0	0–0	0–0	0–0	0–0	–	0–0	0–0	0–0	0–0	0–0	0–0
vs. Southern Miss	0–0	0–0	0–0	0–0	0–0	0–0	0–0	0–0	0–0	–	0–0	0–0	0–0	0–0	0–0
vs. UAB	0–0	0–0	0–0	0–0	0–0	0–0	0–0	0–0	0–0	0–0	–	0–0	0–0	0–0	0–0
vs. UTEP	0–0	0–0	0–0	0–0	0–0	0–0	0–0	0–0	0–0	0–0	0–0	–	0–0	0–0	0–0
vs. UTSA	0–0	0–0	0–0	0–0	0–0	0–0	0–0	0–0	0–0	0–0	0–0	0–0	–	0–0	0–0
vs. WKU	0–0	0–0	0–0	0–0	0–0	0–0	0–0	0–0	0–0	0–0	0–0	0–0	0–0	–	0–0
Total	0–0	0–0	0–0	0–0	0–0	0–0	0–0	0–0	0–0	0–0	0–0	0–0	0–0	0–0	

=== Player of the week ===
Week	Player of the week	Freshman of the week	Reference
Week 1 – Nov 15	Dayvion McKnight – WKU	Aly Khalifa – Charlotte	
Week 2 – Nov 22	Tevin Brewer – FIU	Teafale Lenard – Middle Tennessee	
Week 3 – Nov 29	Kenneth Lofton Jr. – Louisiana Tech	Rashad Bolden – Southern Miss	
Week 4 – Dec 6	Kenneth Lofton Jr. (2) – Louisiana Tech	Aly Khalifa (2) – Charlotte	
Week 5 – Dec 13	Taevion Kinsey – Marshall	Denver Jones – FIU	
Week 6 – Dec 20	Camron Justice – WKU	Kevin Kalu – UTEP	
Week 7 – Dec 27	Jahmir Young – Charlotte	Rashad Bolden (2) – Southern Miss	
Week 8 – Jan 3	Cobe Williams – Louisiana Tech	Aaron Scott – North Texas	
Week 9 – Jan 10	Carl Pierre – Rice	Aaron Scott (2) – North Texas	
Week 10 – Jan 17	Jordan Walker – UAB	Teafale Lenard (2) – Middle Tennessee	
Week 11 – Jan 24	Jordan Walker (2) – UAB	Aaron Scott (3) – North Texas	
Week 12 – Jan 31	Souley Boum – UTEP	Aly Khalifa (3) – Charlotte	
Week 13 – Feb 7	Jordan Walker (3) – UAB	Aly Khalifa (4) – Charlotte	
Week 14 – Feb 14	Josh Jefferson – Middle Tennessee	Teafale Lenard (3) – Middle Tennessee	
Week 15 – Feb 21	Dayvion McKnight (2) – WKU	Aly Khalifa (5) – Charlotte	
Week 16 – Feb 28	Kalu Ezikpe – Old Dominion	Teafale Lenard (4) – Middle Tennessee	
Week 17 – Mar 7	Jamarion Sharp – WKU	Aly Khalifa (6) – Charlotte	

== All-Conference Teams and Awards ==
Award	Recipients
Player of the Year	Jordan Walker (UAB)
Defensive Player of the Year	Jamarion Sharp (Western Kentucky)
Freshman of the Year	Aly Khalifa (Charlotte)
Sixth Player of the Year	Jordan Walker (UAB)
Coach of the Year	Nick McDevitt (Middle Tennessee)
Newcomer of the Year	Tylor Perry (North Texas)
First Team	Jahmir Young (Charlotte); Kenneth Lofton Jr. (Louisiana Tech); Tylor Perry (North Texas); Jordan Walker (UAB); Dayvion McKnight (Western Kentucky)
Second Team	Taevion Kinsey (Marshall); Josh Jefferson (Middle Tennessee); Thomas Bell (North Texas); Austin Trice (Old Dominion); Souley Boum (UTEP)
Third Team	Alijah Martin (Florida Atlantic); Tevin Brewer (FIU); Carl Pierre (Rice); Quan Jackson (UAB); Jamal Bieniemy (UTEP)
All-Freshman Team	Aly Khalifa (Charlotte); Kaleb Stewart (Louisiana Tech); Teafale Lenard (Middle Tennessee); Aaron Scott (North Texas); Rashad Bolden (Southern Miss)
All-Defensive Team	Cobe Williams (Louisiana Tech); Thomas Bell (North Texas); JJ Murray (North Texas); Quan Jackson (UAB); Jamarion Sharp (Western Kentucky)
