= 2021–22 Old Dominion Monarchs men's basketball team =

American college basketball season

2021–22 Old Dominion Monarchs men's basketball
- Conference: Conference USA
- East Division
- Record: 13–19 (8–10 C-USA)
- Head coach: Jeff Jones (9th season)
- Assistant coaches: John Richardson; Bryant Stith; Chris Kovensky
- Home arena: Chartway Arena

2021–22 Conference USA men's basketball standings
	Conf.				Overall
Team	W		L	PCT	W		L	PCT
East
Middle Tennessee	13	–	5	.722	26	–	11	.703
Western Kentucky	11	–	7	.611	19	–	13	.594
Florida Atlantic	11	–	7	.611	19	–	15	.559
Charlotte	10	–	8	.556	17	–	14	.548
Old Dominion	8	–	10	.444	13	–	19	.406
FIU	5	–	13	.278	15	–	17	.469
Marshall	4	–	14	.222	12	–	21	.364
West
North Texas	16	–	2	.889	25	–	7	.781
UAB †	14	–	4	.778	27	–	8	.771
Louisiana Tech	12	–	6	.667	24	–	10	.706
UTEP	11	–	7	.611	20	–	14	.588
Rice	7	–	11	.389	16	–	17	.485
UTSA	3	–	15	.167	10	–	22	.313
Southern Miss	1	–	17	.056	7	–	26	.212
† 2022 C-USA Tournament winner

The 2021–22 Old Dominion Monarchs men’s basketball team represented Old Dominion University in the 2020–21 NCAA Division I men's basketball season. The Monarchs, led by ninth-year head coach Jeff Jones, played their home games at Chartway Arena in Norfolk, Virginia as members of the East division of Conference USA. They finished the season 13–19, 8–10 in C-USA play to finish in fifth place in the East division. They lost to UTEP in the second round of the C-USA tournament.

On October 27, 2021, Old Dominion announced that the season would be the last for the team in C-USA and that they would join the Sun Belt Conference on July 1, 2022.

== Previous season ==
In a season limited due to the ongoing COVID-19 pandemic, the Monarchs finished the 2020–21 season 15–8, 11–5 in C-USA play to finish in second place in East division. They lost in the quarterfinals of the C-USA tournament to North Texas.

== Offseason ==
=== Departures ===
Name	Number	Pos.	Height	Weight	Year	Hometown	Reason for departure
Malik Curry	3	G	6'1"	180	Senior	Wilmington, DE	Graduate transferred to West Virginia
Xavier Green	10	G	6'6"	200	RS Senior	Williamsburg, VA	Graduate transferred to Maryland
John Shanu II	13	F	6'10"	220	Freshman	Houston, TX	Left the team for personal reasons
Joe Reece	15	F	6'8"	200	Junior	St. Louis, MO	Transferred to Bowling Green
Alfis Pilavios	21	G	6'5"	200	RS Junior	Athens, Greece	Signed to play professionally in Greece with Lavrio B.C.
David Strother	25	G	6'2"	175	Senior	Lumberton, NC	Graduate transferred to USC Aiken

=== Incoming transfers ===
Name	Number	Pos.	Height	Weight	Year	Hometown	Previous School
PJ Gill	13	G	6'0"		Junior	Virginia Beach, VA	Johnson & Wales
Charles Smith IV	15	G	6'5"	185	Junior	Atlanta, GA	SMU
Stephan Morris	20	F	6'9"	210	Junior	Houston, TX	Kilgore College
C.J. Keyser	25	G	6'3"	190	RS Senior	Baltimore, MD	North Carolina Central

=== 2021 recruiting class ===
College recruiting
Name	Hometown	School	Height	Weight	Commit date
Jadin Johnson #47 PG	Council Bluffs, IA	Abraham Lincoln High School	6 ft 3 in (1.91 m)	175 lb (79 kg)	Aug 12, 2020
Jadin Johnson #47 PG	Recruit ratings: Scout: Rivals: 247Sports: ESPN: (76)				
Imo Essien; PG	Wylie, TX	Bishop Lynch High School	6 ft 0 in (1.83 m)	155 lb (70 kg)	Jul 30, 2020
Imo Essien; PG	Recruit ratings: 247Sports:				
D’Angelo Stines; PG	Baltimore, MD	Mount Saint Joseph College	6 ft 1 in (1.85 m)	180 lb (82 kg)	Jul 9, 2020
D’Angelo Stines; PG	Recruit ratings: 247Sports:				
Overall recruit ranking:
Note: In many cases, Scout, Rivals, 247Sports, On3, and ESPN may conflict in their listings of height and weight.; In these cases, the average was taken. ESPN grades are on a 100-point scale.; Sources: "Old Dominion 2021 Player Commits". ESPN.; "2021 Team Ranking". Rivals.

== Roster ==
2021–22 Old Dominion Monarchs men's basketball team
Players
Coaches

Pos.	#	Name	Height	Weight	Year	Previous school	Hometown
G	0	Mekhi Long	6 ft 7 in (2.01 m)	200 lb (91 kg)	Jr	Rhode Island	Bryans Road, Maryland
G	1	Jason Wade	6 ft 5 in (1.96 m)	210 lb (95 kg)	RS Jr	Trinity Episcopal School	Richmond, Virginia
G	2	Brady O'Connell	6 ft 7 in (2.01 m)	190 lb (86 kg)	So	Ravenscroft School	Milton, Georgia
G	3	Imo Essien	5 ft 11 in (1.8 m)	170 lb (77 kg)	Fr	Bishop Lynch High School	Wylie, Texas
G	4	Jadin Johnson	6 ft 0 in (1.83 m)	175 lb (79 kg)	Fr	Millard North High School	Omaha, Nebraska
G	10	D’Angelo Stines	6 ft 1 in (1.85 m)	180 lb (82 kg)	Fr	Mount Saint Joseph High School	Columbia, Maryland
G	11	A.J. Oliver II	6 ft 5 in (1.96 m)	200 lb (91 kg)	RS Sr	Clemson	Birmingham, Alabama
G	12	Jaylin Hunter	5 ft 11 in (1.8 m)	195 lb (88 kg)	Jr	East Catholic High School	Manchester, Connecticut
G	13	P.J. Gill (W)	5 ft 11 in (1.8 m)	165 lb (75 kg)	Sr	Johnson & Wales	Virginia Beach, Virginia
G	15	Charles Smith IV	6 ft 5 in (1.96 m)	200 lb (91 kg)	Jr	SMU	Atlanta, Georgia
F	20	Stephan Morris	6 ft 7 in (2.01 m)	220 lb (100 kg)	Jr	Kilgore College	Houston, Texas
F	22	Kalu Ezikpe	6 ft 8 in (2.03 m)	235 lb (107 kg)	Sr	Discovery High School	Lawrenceville, Georgia
F	23	Austin Trice	6 ft 7 in (2.01 m)	235 lb (107 kg)	RS Sr	Kansas State	Chicago, Illinois
G	25	C.J. Keyser	6 ft 3 in (1.91 m)	190 lb (86 kg)	RS Sr	North Carolina Central	Baltimore, Maryland

Head coach

- Jeff Jones (Virginia '82)

Assistant coach(es)

- John Richardson (Elizabeth City State '95)
- Bryant Stith (Virginia '92)
- Chris Kovensky (Old Dominion '11)

Legend

- (C) Team captain
- (S) Suspended
- (I) Ineligible
- (W) Walk-on
- Injured
- Current redshirt

Roster

== Schedule and results ==
Date time, TV	Rank^{#}	Opponent^{#}	Result	Record	High points	High rebounds	High assists	Site (attendance) city, state
Exhibition
November 6, 2021*; 7:00 p.m.		Gannon	W 96–56	–	18 – Ezikpe	11 – Ezikpe	4 – Hunter	Chartway Arena; Norfolk, VA
Non-conference regular season
November 10, 2021*; 7:00 p.m., ESPN+		Virginia Wesleyan	W 80–60	1–0	21 – Ezikpe	12 – Ezikpe	4 – Tied	Chartaway Arena (6,037); Norfolk, VA
November 13, 2021*; 7:00 p.m., FloSports		at James Madison; Rivalry	L 53–58	1–1	21 – Keyser	9 – Smith	3 – Hunter	Atlantic Union Bank Center (5,011); Harrisburg, VA
November 14, 2021*; 7:00 p.m., ESPN+		Manhattan	W 79–58	2–1	18 – Tied	5 – Tied	6 – Hunter	Chartaway Arena (4,412); Norfolk, VA
November 18, 2021*; 9:30 p.m., ESPNU		vs. Indiana State; Myrtle Beach Invitational Quarterfinals	L 36–77	2–2	7 – Tied	9 – Long	2 – Ezikpe	HTC Center (1,237); Conway, SC
November 19, 2021*; 7:30 p.m., ESPNU		vs. East Carolina; Myrtle Beach Invitational Consolation 2nd Round	L 60–73	2–3	16 – Ezikpe	8 – Ezikpe	2 – Tied	HTC Center (1,183); Conway, SC
November 21, 2021*; 12:30 p.m., ESPNews		vs. Penn; Myrtle Beach Invitational 7th Place Game	L 63–71	2–4	15 – Hunter	7 – Tied	5 – Dingle	HTC Center; Conway, SC
November 26, 2021*; 4:00 p.m., ESPN+		Longwood	W 62–61	3–4	18 – Long	7 – Trice	6 – Hunter	Chartaway Arena (4,275); Norfolk, VA
November 30, 2021*; 7:00 p.m., ESPN+		at East Carolina	L 62–63	3–5	19 – Keyser	8 – Ezikpe	5 – Hunter	Williams Arena (2,250); Greenville, NC
December 4, 2021*; 7:00 p.m., ESPN+		at George Mason	W 60–50	4–5	19 – Keyser	9 – Long	2 – Hunter	EagleBank Arena (3,529); Fairfax, VA
December 7, 2021*; 7:00 p.m., FloSports		at William & Mary; Rivalry	W 74–59	5–5	18 – Ezikpe	8 – Ezikpe	7 – Hunter	Kaplan Arena (2,286); Williamsburg, VA
December 11, 2021*; 8:00 p.m., Stadium		VCU; Rivalry	L 66–75	5–6	16 – Trice	8 – Trice	6 – Hunter	Chartaway Arena (7,919); Norfolk, VA
December 19, 2021*; 4:00 p.m., ESPN+		at Richmond	L 61–67	5–7	20 – Trice	16 – Trice	4 – Hunter	Robins Center (6,884); Richmond, VA
December 22, 2021*; 7:00 p.m., ESPN+		College of Charleston	L 80–82	5–8	26 – Keyser	9 – Tied	3 – Tied	Chartaway Arena (4,272); Norfolk, VA
Conference USA regular season
December 30, 2021; 7:00 p.m., CUSA.tv		at FIU	W 82–77	6–8 (1–0)	25 – Trice	13 – Long	4 – Trice	Ocean Bank Convocation Center (158); Miami, FL
January 13, 2022; 7:00 p.m., ESPN+		UTSA	W 83–51	7–8 (2–0)	19 – Trice	9 – Long	7 – Hunter	Chartaway Arena (4,657); Norfolk, VA
January 15, 2022; 7:00 p.m., ESPN+		UTEP	L 70–78 ^{OT}	7–9 (2–1)	19 – Tied	20 – Trice	5 – Hunter	Chartaway Arena (4,528); Norfolk, VA
January 20, 2022; 8:00 p.m., CUSA.tv		at Rice	L 69–77	7–10 (2–2)	21 – Keyser	10 – Trice	5 – Hunter	Tudor Fieldhouse (1,407); Houston, TX
January 22, 2022; 6:00 p.m., ESPN+		at North Texas	L 56–69	7–11 (2–3)	20 – Hunter	8 – Trice	2 – Tied	The Super Pit (3,475); Denton, TX
January 26, 2022; 7:00 p.m., ESPN+		at Charlotte; Rescheduled from January 8	L 67–71	7–12 (2–4)	20 – Keyser	14 – Trice	2 – Tied	Dale F. Halton Arena (2,561); Charlotte, NC
January 29, 2022; 7:00 p.m., ESPN+		Charlotte	W 68–52	8–12 (3–4)	22 – Trice	11 – Long	4 – Hunter	Chartaway Arena (4,632); Norfolk, VA
February 3, 2022; 8:00 p.m., CBSSN		Marshall	W 79–64	9–12 (4–4)	19 – Keyser	18 – Trice	9 – Hunter	Chartaway Arena (4,370); Norfolk, VA
February 5, 2022; 7:00 p.m., ESPN+		Western Kentucky	L 60–77	9–13 (4–5)	19 – Keyser	13 – Trice	5 – Hunter	Chartaway Arena (5,914); Norfolk, VA
February 8, 2022; 6:00 p.m., CUSA.tv		at Florida Atlantic; Rescheduled from January 1	L 62–81	9–14 (4–6)	19 – Trice	14 – Trice	3 – Tied	FAU Arena (1,106); Boca Raton, FL
February 10, 2022; 7:00 p.m., ESPN+		at Middle Tennessee	L 48–63	9–15 (4–7)	18 – Trice	13 – Trice	4 – Hunter	Murphy Center (3,645); Murfreesboro, TN
February 13, 2022; 2:00 p.m., ESPNU		UAB	W 81–72	10–15 (5–7)	20 – Trice	10 – Trice	7 – Hunter	Chartaway Arena (3,777); Norfolk, VA
February 17, 2022; 7:00 p.m., ESPN+		at Marshall	L 63–67	10–16 (5–8)	21 – Keyser	19 – Trice	3 – Long	Cam Henderson Center (3,867); Huntington, WV
February 19, 2022; 7:00 p.m., ESPN+		at Western Kentucky	L 64–73	10–17 (5–9)	20 – Hunter	11 – Ezikpe	4 – Long	E. A. Diddle Arena (5,015); Bowling Green, KY
February 24, 2022; 7:00 p.m., ESPN+		Florida Atlantic	W 70–51	11–17 (6–9)	17 – Ezikpe	17 – Ezikpe	3 – Hunter	Chartaway Arena (4,376); Norfolk, VA
February 26, 2022; 7:00 p.m., ESPN+		FIU	W 83–63	12–17 (7–9)	23 – Trice	15 – Trice	4 – Long	Chartaway Arena (5,342); Norfolk, VA
March 2, 2022; 7:00 p.m., CBSSN		at Louisiana Tech	L 54–67	12–18 (7–10)	18 – Trice	12 – Trice	3 – Keyser	Thomas Assembly Center (2,681); Ruston, LA
March 5, 2022; 2:00 p.m., CUSA.tv		Middle Tennessee	W 68–64	13–18 (8–10)	16 – Keyser	8 – Trice	3 – Ezikpe	Chartaway Arena (5,230); Norfolk, VA
Conference USA tournament
March 9, 2022; 8:00 p.m., ESPN+	(E5)	vs. (W4) UTEP; Second round	L 64–74	13–19	20 – Keyser	12 – Long	3 – Keyser	Ford Center at The Star; Denton, TX
*Non-conference game. ^{#}Rankings from AP Poll. (#) Tournament seedings in parentheses. All times are in Eastern.
