= 2021–22 Louisiana Tech Bulldogs basketball team =

College sports team

2021–22 Louisiana Tech Bulldogs basketball
- Conference: Conference USA
- West Division
- Record: 24–10 (12–6 C-USA)
- Head coach: Eric Konkol (7th season)
- Assistant coaches: Duffy Conroy; Desmond Haymon; Josten Crow
- Home arena: Thomas Assembly Center

2021–22 Conference USA men's basketball standings
	Conf.				Overall
Team	W		L	PCT	W		L	PCT
East
Middle Tennessee	13	–	5	.722	26	–	11	.703
Western Kentucky	11	–	7	.611	19	–	13	.594
Florida Atlantic	11	–	7	.611	19	–	15	.559
Charlotte	10	–	8	.556	17	–	14	.548
Old Dominion	8	–	10	.444	13	–	19	.406
FIU	5	–	13	.278	15	–	17	.469
Marshall	4	–	14	.222	12	–	21	.364
West
North Texas	16	–	2	.889	25	–	7	.781
UAB †	14	–	4	.778	27	–	8	.771
Louisiana Tech	12	–	6	.667	24	–	10	.706
UTEP	11	–	7	.611	20	–	14	.588
Rice	7	–	11	.389	16	–	17	.485
UTSA	3	–	15	.167	10	–	22	.313
Southern Miss	1	–	17	.056	7	–	26	.212
† 2022 C-USA Tournament winner

The 2021–22 Louisiana Tech Bulldogs basketball team represented Louisiana Tech University during the 2021–22 NCAA Division I men's basketball season. The team were led by seventh-year head coach Eric Konkol, and played their home games at Thomas Assembly Center in Ruston, Louisiana as a members of the West Division of Conference USA.

== Previous season ==
The Bulldogs finished the 2020–21 season 24–8, 12–4 in C-USA play to win the West Division. They defeated Florida Atlantic in the quarterfinals of the C-USA tournament before losing to North Texas. They received a bid to the National Invitation Tournament, where they lost to Mississippi State, but then defeated Colorado State in the third place game.

== Offseason ==
=== Departures ===
Name	Number	Pos.	Height	Weight	Year	Hometown	Reason for departure
Lane Hartley	4	G	6'2"	200	Senior	Chatham, LA	Left the team for personal reasons
Kalob Ledoux	5	G	6'4"	190	RS Senior	Port Barre, LA	Graduated
Xaiver Armstead	10	G	6'5"	200	Senior	Waco, TX	Graduate transferred to Texas A&M–Kingsville
JaColby Pemberton	11	G	6'5"	195	RS Senor	Dallas, TX	Graduated
Thailand Elder	25	G	6'2"	170	Freshman	Chicago, IL	Transferred to Collin College
Andrew Gordon	33	F	6'10"	260	RS Senior	Clearwater, FL	Graduated
Kale Walters	40	F	6'7"	200	Junior	Lindale, TX	Walk-on; left the team for personal reasons

=== Incoming transfers ===
Name	Number	Pos.	Height	Weight	Year	Hometown	Previous school
Keaston Willis	0	G	6'3"	190	Junior	Sulphur Springs, TX	Incarnate Word
LaDamien Bradford	11	G	6'5"	215	Sophomore	Lincoln, NE	Texas A&M
David Green	23	F	6'7"	215	Sophomore	Apopka, FL	Hofstra

=== Recruiting class of 2021 ===
College recruiting
Name	Hometown	School	Height	Weight	Commit date
Kaleb Stewart; PG	Humble, TX	Atascocita High School	6 ft 3 in (1.91 m)	180 lb (82 kg)	Sep 4, 2020
Kaleb Stewart; PG	Recruit ratings: Scout: Rivals: 247Sports: ESPN:				
Terran Williams; SF	Marianna, AR	Lee High School	6 ft 4 in (1.93 m)	170 lb (77 kg)	Sep 17, 2020
Terran Williams; SF	Recruit ratings: Scout: Rivals: 247Sports: ESPN:				
Will Allen; PF	Kenner, LA	Alfred Bonnabel High School	6 ft 8 in (2.03 m)	220 lb (100 kg)	Aug 22, 2020
Will Allen; PF	Recruit ratings: Scout: Rivals: 247Sports: ESPN:				
Overall recruit ranking:
Note: In many cases, Scout, Rivals, 247Sports, On3, and ESPN may conflict in their listings of height and weight.; In these cases, the average was taken. ESPN grades are on a 100-point scale.; Sources: "2021 Team Ranking". Rivals.

=== Recruiting class of 2022 ===
College recruiting (2022)
Name	Hometown	School	Height	Weight	Commit date
BB Knight; SG	Humble, TX	Atascocita High School	6 ft 5 in (1.96 m)	185 lb (84 kg)	Aug 16, 2021
BB Knight; SG	Recruit ratings: Scout: Rivals: 247Sports: ESPN:				
Jesaiah McWright; SF	Cypress, TX	Cypress Falls High School	6 ft 4 in (1.93 m)	180 lb (82 kg)	Sep 18, 2021
Jesaiah McWright; SF	Recruit ratings: Scout: Rivals: 247Sports: ESPN:				
Overall recruit ranking:
Note: In many cases, Scout, Rivals, 247Sports, On3, and ESPN may conflict in their listings of height and weight.; In these cases, the average was taken. ESPN grades are on a 100-point scale.; Sources: "2022 Team Ranking". Rivals.

== Roster ==
2021–22 Louisiana Tech Bulldogs men's basketball team
Players
Coaches

Pos.	#	Name	Height	Weight	Year	Previous school	Hometown
G	0	Keaston Willis	6 ft 3 in (1.91 m)	190 lb (86 kg)	Jr	Sulphur Springs HS; Incarnate Word	Sulphur Springs, TX
F	1	Kenny Hunter	6 ft 10 in (2.08 m)	235 lb (107 kg)	So	Huntington HS	Shreveport, LA
F	2	Kenneth Lofton Jr.	6 ft 7 in (2.01 m)	275 lb (125 kg)	So	Memorial HS	Port Arthur, TX
G	3	Amorie Archibald	6 ft 3 in (1.91 m)	185 lb (84 kg)	GS	Trinity Christian Academy	Deltona, FL
G	4	Kaleb Stewart	6 ft 3 in (1.91 m)	180 lb (82 kg)	Fr	Atascicuta HS	Atascocita, TX
G	5	Terran Williams	6 ft 5 in (1.96 m)	200 lb (91 kg)	Fr	Marianna Lee HS	Marianna, AR
G	10	Ben Ponder (W)	6 ft 3 in (1.91 m)	195 lb (88 kg)	Fr	Calvary Baptist Academy	Shreveport, LA
G	11	LaDamien Bradford	6 ft 5 in (1.96 m)	215 lb (98 kg)	So	Jonesboro-Hodge HS; Texas A&M	Lincoln, NE
F	13	Stacey Thomas	6 ft 8 in (2.03 m)	220 lb (100 kg)	Sr	Fortbend Christian Home School	Houston, TX
F	14	Will Allen	6 ft 7 in (2.01 m)	210 lb (95 kg)	Fr	Akfred Bonnabel HS	New Orleans, LA
G	21	Exavian Christon	6 ft 4 in (1.93 m)	200 lb (91 kg)	GS	Hot Springs HS	Hot Springs, AR
F	22	Isaiah Crawford (redshirt)	6 ft 6 in (1.98 m)	220 lb (100 kg)	Jr	North Crowley HS	Fort Worth, TX
F	23	David Green	6 ft 7 in (2.01 m)	215 lb (98 kg)	So	Ocoee HS; Hofstra	Apopka, FL
G	24	Cobe Williams	6 ft 0 in (1.83 m)	180 lb (82 kg)	Jr	Kimball HS	Dallas, TX

Head coach

- Eric Konkol (UW–Eau Claire)

Assistant coach(es)

- Duffy Conroy (St. Ambrose)
- Desmond Haymon (Stephen F. Austin)
- Josten Crow (Sam Houston State)

Legend

- (C) Team captain
- (S) Suspended
- (I) Ineligible
- (W) Walk-on
- Injured
- Current redshirt

Roster

== Schedule and results ==
Date time, TV	Rank^{#}	Opponent^{#}	Result	Record	Site (attendance) city, state
Exhibition
November 4, 2021*; 6:30 p.m.		Mississippi College	W 86–50	–	Thomas Assembly Center; Ruston, LA
Non-conference regular season
November 9, 2021*; 8:00 p.m., SECN		at No. 14 Alabama	L 64–93	0–1	Coleman Coliseum (12,613); Tucaloosa, AL
November 12, 2021*; 6:30 p.m., ESPN+		Jackson State	W 70–68	1–1	Thomas Assembly Center (2,449); Ruston, LA
November 15, 2021*; 6:30 p.m., CUSA.tv		Jarvis Christian	W 91–61	2–1	Thomas Assembly Center (2,134); Ruston, LA
November 19, 2021*; 7:30 p.m., NSU tv		at Northwestern State; Lanky Wells Classic	W 83–64	3–1	Prather Coliseum (1,378); Natchitoches, LA
November 24, 2021*; 6:30 p.m., CUSA.tv		Louisiana–Monroe; Lanky Wells Classic	W 96–74	4–1	Thomas Assembly Center (2,233); Ruston, LA
November 27, 2021*; 1:00 p.m., ACCNX		at NC State	L 81–90	4–2	PNC Arena (10,919); Raleigh, NC
December 1, 2021*; 6:30 p.m., ESPN+		Texas Southern	W 87–60	5–2	Thomas Assembly Center (2,286); Ruston, LA
December 4, 2021*; 4:00 p.m., WCC Network		at Santa Clara	W 78–75	6–2	Leavey Center (821); Santa Clara, CA
December 11, 2021*; 11:00 a.m., ESPNU		Louisiana	W 78–69	7–2	Thomas Assembly Center (2,603); Ruston, LA
December 14, 2021*; 6:30 p.m., CUSA.tv		LSU–Shreveport	W 84–70	8–2	Thomas Assembly Center (2,078); Ruston, LA
December 18, 2021*; 6:00 p.m., CBSSN		vs. No. 19 LSU; Bossier City Showcase	L 57–66	8–3	Brookshire Grocery Arena; Bossier City, LA
December 22, 2022*; 4:00 p.m., CUSA.tv		Crowley's Ridge	W 99–56	9–3	Thomas Assembly Center (1,898); Ruston, LA
Conference USA regular season
December 30, 2021; 8:00 p.m., ESPN2/ESPNU		Marshall	W 79–56	10–3 (1–0)	Thomas Assembly Center (2,778); Ruston, LA
January 1, 2022; 1:00 p.m., CBSSN		Western Kentucky	W 74–73	11–3 (2–0)	Thomas Assembly Center (2,348); Ruston, LA
January 6, 2022; 9:00 p.m., CBSSN		at UTEP	W 64–52	12–3 (3–0)	Don Haskins Center (3,701); El Paso, TX
January 8, 2022; 3:00 p.m., ESPN+		at UTSA	W 79–63	13–3 (4–0)	Convocation Center (773); San Antonio, TX
January 13, 2022; 6:00 p.m., CBSSN		Southern Miss	W 80–57	14–3 (5–0)	Thomas Assembly Center (2,731); Ruston, LA
January 16, 2022; 2:00 p.m., ESPN+		at Southern Miss	W 76–62	15–3 (6–0)	Reed Green Coliseum (3,110); Hattiesburg, MS
January 22, 2022; 3:00 p.m., Stadium		UAB	L 76–83	15–4 (6–1)	Thomas Assembly Center (4,071); Ruston, LA
January 27, 2022; 6:30 p.m., ESPN+		Rice	W 80–63	16–4 (7–1)	Thomas Assembly Center (2,634); Ruston, LA
January 29, 2022; 3:00 p.m., Stadium		North Texas	L 62–63	16–5 (7–2)	Thomas Assembly Center (4,002); Ruston, LA
February 3, 2022; 6:00 p.m., ESPN+		at Florida Atlantic	L 73–83	16–6 (7–3)	FAU Arena (1,683); Boca Raton, FL
February 5, 2022; 6:00 p.m., ESPN+		at FIU	W 86–82	17–6 (8–3)	Ocean Bank Convocation Center (4,276); Miami, FL
February 10, 2022; 6:00 p.m., Stadium		at Charlotte	W 82–77	18–6 (9–3)	Dale F. Halton Arena (2,770); Charlotte, NC
February 17, 2022; 6:30 p.m., ESPN+		UTEP	L 60–63	18–7 (9–4)	Thomas Assembly Center (2,777); Ruston, LA
February 19, 2022; 4:00 p.m., ESPN+		UTSA	W 95–71	19–7 (10–4)	Thomas Assembly Center (3,553); Ruston, LA
February 24, 2022; 7:00 p.m., Stadium		at Rice	W 83–79	20–7 (11–4)	Tudor Fieldhouse (2,226); Houston, TX
February 26, 2022; 3:00 p.m., Stadium		at North Texas	L 49–56	20–8 (11–5)	The Super Pit (8,522); Denton, TX
March 2, 2022; 6:00 p.m., CUSA.tv		Old Dominion	W 67–54	21–8 (12–5)	Thomas Assembly Center (2,681); Ruston, LA
March 5, 2021; 2:00 p.m., Stadium		at UAB	L 74–87	21–9 (12–6)	Bartow Arena (4,547); Birmingham, AL
Conference USA tournament
March 9, 2022; 6:00 p.m., ESPN+	(W3)	vs. (E7) Marshall; Second round	W 77–67	22–9	Ford Center at The Star; Frisco, TX
March 10, 2022; 6:00 p.m., Stadium	(W3)	vs. (E2) Western Kentucky; Quarterfinals	W 59–57	23–9	Ford Center at The Star; Frisco, TX
March 11, 2022; 11:30 a.m., CBSSN	(W3)	vs. (W1) North Texas; Semifinals	W 42–36	24–9	Ford Center at The Star; Frisco, TX
March 12, 2022; 7:30 p.m., CBSSN	(W3)	vs. (W2) UAB; Championship	L 73–82	24–10	Ford Center at The Star; Frisco, TX
*Non-conference game. ^{#}Rankings from AP Poll. (#) Tournament seedings in parentheses. All times are in Central.

== See also ==
- 2021–22 Louisiana Tech Lady Techsters basketball team
