= 2021–22 FIU Panthers men's basketball team =

Men's college basketball season

2021–22 FIU Panthers men's basketball
- Conference: Conference USA
- East Division
- Record: 15–17 (5–13 C-USA)
- Head coach: Jeremy Ballard (4th season)
- Associate head coach: Jesse Bopp
- Assistant coaches: Joey Rodriguez; Zavier Anderson
- Home arena: Ocean Bank Convocation Center

2021–22 Conference USA men's basketball standings
	Conf.				Overall
Team	W		L	PCT	W		L	PCT
East
Middle Tennessee	13	–	5	.722	26	–	11	.703
Western Kentucky	11	–	7	.611	19	–	13	.594
Florida Atlantic	11	–	7	.611	19	–	15	.559
Charlotte	10	–	8	.556	17	–	14	.548
Old Dominion	8	–	10	.444	13	–	19	.406
FIU	5	–	13	.278	15	–	17	.469
Marshall	4	–	14	.222	12	–	21	.364
West
North Texas	16	–	2	.889	25	–	7	.781
UAB †	14	–	4	.778	27	–	8	.771
Louisiana Tech	12	–	6	.667	24	–	10	.706
UTEP	11	–	7	.611	20	–	14	.588
Rice	7	–	11	.389	16	–	17	.485
UTSA	3	–	15	.167	10	–	22	.313
Southern Miss	1	–	17	.056	7	–	26	.212
† 2022 C-USA Tournament winner

The 2021–22 FIU Panthers men's basketball team represented Florida International University in the 2021–22 NCAA Division I men's basketball season. The Panthers, led by fourth-year head coach Jeremy Ballard, played their home games at Ocean Bank Convocation Center in Miami, Florida as members of the East Division of Conference USA (C-USA).

== Previous season ==
The Panthers finished the 2020–21 season 9–17, 2–15 in C-USA play, to finish in last place in East Division. Their season ended with their withdrawal from the C-USA tournament due to positive COVID-19 tests within the program.

== Offseason ==
=== Departures ===
Name	Number	Pos.	Height	Weight	Year	Hometown	Reason for departure
Dimon Carringan	0	F	6' 9"	215	Senior	Boston, MA	Graduate transferred to West Virginia
DJ Mitchell	2	G	6' 4"	190	Junior	Washington, D.C.	Graduate transferred to Valdosta State
Antonio Daye Jr.	5	G	6' 3"	188	Junior	Durham, NC	Transferred to Fordham
Rashad Davis	10	G	6' 4"	205	RS Senior	Nassau, Bahamas	Graduated
Bernie Andre	20	F	6' 6"	210	Senior	North Miami Beach, FL	Graduate transferred to UT Martin
Jonathan Nunez	21	G	5' 11"	180	Sophomore	Miami, FL	Walk-on; left the team for personal reasons
Anthony Mason	35	F	6' 10"	225	Junior	Decatur, AL	Graduate transferred to Lane College
Devon Andrews	50	F	6' 6"	190	RS Senior	Lorain, OH	Walk-on; graduated
Cameron Corcoan	55	G	6' 1"	170	RS Junior	Orlando, FL	Graduate transferred to St. Thomas

=== Incoming transfers ===
Name	Number	Pos.	Height	Weight	Year	Hometown	Previous school
Denver Jones	2	G	6' 4"	195	Sophomore	New Market, AL	Garden City CC
Aquan Smart	10	G	6' 3"	175	Sophomore	Evanston, IL	Maryland
Victor Hart	11	F	6' 8"		RS Junior	Miami, FL	Miami Dade College
Clevon Brown	15	F	6' 8"	232	RS Senior	San Antonio, TX	Vanderbilt
Daniel Parrish	24	G	6' 4"	180	RS Junior	Augusta, GA	South Georgia State College
Seth Pinkey	44	C	7' 1"	200	Junior	Warminster, PA	Quinnipiac

=== Recruiting class of 2021 ===
College recruiting information
Name	Hometown	School	Height	Weight	Commit date
CJ Kelley; PF	Texarkana, TX	Link Year Preparatory School	6 ft 8 in (2.03 m)	185 lb (84 kg)	Oct 21, 2020
CJ Kelley; PF	Recruit ratings: No ratings found				
Mohamed Sanogo; C	Côte D'ivoire	Putnam Science Academy	6 ft 9 in (2.06 m)	200 lb (91 kg)	Sep 28, 2020
Mohamed Sanogo; C	Recruit ratings: No ratings found				
Overall recruit ranking:
Note: In many cases, Scout, Rivals, 247Sports, On3, and ESPN may conflict in their listings of height and weight.; In these cases, the average was taken. ESPN grades are on a 100-point scale.; Sources: "2021 Team Ranking". Rivals.

=== Recruiting class of 2022 ===
College recruiting information (2022)
Name	Hometown	School	Height	Weight	Commit date
Da'Shon Gittens; PG	Woodstock, CT	Woodstock Academy	6 ft 2 in (1.88 m)	160 lb (73 kg)	Sep 8, 2021
Da'Shon Gittens; PG	Recruit ratings: No ratings found				
Darryon Prescott; C	Philadelphia, PA	Mathematics, Civics and Sciences Charter School	7 ft 0 in (2.13 m)	200 lb (91 kg)	Oct 2, 2021
Darryon Prescott; C	Recruit ratings: No ratings found				
Overall recruit ranking:
Note: In many cases, Scout, Rivals, 247Sports, On3, and ESPN may conflict in their listings of height and weight.; In these cases, the average was taken. ESPN grades are on a 100-point scale.; Sources: "2022 Team Ranking". Rivals.

== Roster ==
2021–22 FIU Panthers men's basketball team
Players
Coaches

Pos.	#	Name	Height	Weight	Year	Previous school	Hometown
G	0	Tevin Brewer	5 ft 8 in (1.73 m)	160 lb (73 kg)	RS Sr	Northside HS; Coffeyville CC	Fort Smith, AR
G	1	Isaiah Banks	6 ft 5 in (1.96 m)	180 lb (82 kg)	RS Sr	Heritage HS	Conyers, GA
G	2	Denver Jones	6 ft 4 in (1.93 m)	195 lb (88 kg)	So	Memphis Day Academy; Garden City CC	New Market, AL
G	3	Javaunte Hawkins	5 ft 11 in (1.8 m)	160 lb (73 kg)	Jr	Lee's Summit North HS; Butler CC	Lee's Summit, MO
G/F	4	Eric Lovett	6 ft 5 in (1.96 m)	200 lb (91 kg)	RS Sr	Jonesboro HS; Missouri State–West Plains	Jonesboro, GA
F	5	CJ Kelley	6 ft 8 in (2.03 m)	185 lb (84 kg)	Fr	Link Year Prep	Texarkana, TX
G	10	Aquan Smart	6 ft 3 in (1.91 m)	175 lb (79 kg)	So	Niles North HS; Maryland	Evanston, IL
F	11	Victor Hart	6 ft 8 in (2.03 m)	200 lb (91 kg)	RS Jr	Miami North HS; Miami Dade College	Miami, FL
G/F	12	Dante Wilcox	6 ft 6 in (1.98 m)	220 lb (100 kg)	RS So	Oxbridge Academy	West Palm Beach, FL
F	15	Clevon Brown	6 ft 8 in (2.03 m)	232 lb (105 kg)	RS Sr	Winston Churchill HS; Vanderbilt	San Antonio, TX
F	20	James Ametepe (W)	6 ft 5 in (1.96 m)	210 lb (95 kg)	Sr	Westwood Christian School	Accra, Ghana
G	23	Petar Krivokapic	6 ft 4 in (1.93 m)	200 lb (91 kg)	So	Miami Prep School	Budva, Montenegro
G	24	Daniel Parrish	6 ft 3 in (1.91 m)	180 lb (82 kg)	RS Jr	Aquinas HS; South Georgia State College	Aiken, SC
F	33	Mohamed Sanogo	6 ft 9 in (2.06 m)	200 lb (91 kg)	Fr	Putnam Science Academy	Pittsfield, MA
C	44	Seth Pinkney	7 ft 1 in (2.16 m)	200 lb (91 kg)	Jr	Montverde Academy; Quinnipiac	Warminster, PA

Head coach

- Jeremy Ballard (Colgate)

Assistant coach(es)

- Jesse Bopp (Plymouth State)
- Joey Rodriguez (VCU)
- Zavier Anderson (Clemson)

Legend

- (C) Team captain
- (S) Suspended
- (I) Ineligible
- (W) Walk-on
- Injured
- Current redshirt

Roster

== Schedule and results ==
Date time, TV	Rank^{#}	Opponent^{#}	Result	Record	Site (attendance) city, state
Regular season
November 9, 2021*; 7:00 p.m., SECN+/ESPN+		at Georgia	L 51–58	0–1	Stegeman Coliseum (6,023); Athens, GA
November 12, 2021*; 7:00 p.m.		Trinity College	W 111–48	1–1	Ocean Bank Convocation Center; Miami, FL
November 18, 2021*; 8:00 p.m., CBSSN		vs. Ball State; Jersey Mike's Classic	W 73–60	2–1	McArthur Center (205); St. Petersburg, FL
November 19, 2021*; 8:00 p.m., Pluto TV		vs. Green Bay; Jersey Mike's Classic	W 63–60	3–1	McArthur Center (345); St. Petersburg, FL
November 21, 2021*; 5:00 p.m., Pluto TV		vs. UNC Greensboro; Jersey Mike's Classic	W 74–71 ^{OT}	4–1	McArthur Center (175); St. Petersburg, FL
November 24, 2021*; 11:00 a.m.		North Dakota	W 65–56	5–1	Ocean Bank Convocation Center; Miami, FL
November 28, 2021*; 12:00 p.m.		North Florida	W 84–69	6–1	Ocean Bank Convocation Center (223); Miami, FL
December 1, 2021*; 7:00 p.m., ESPN+		Florida Gulf Coast	W 77–61	7–1	Ocean Bank Convocation Center (446); Miami, FL
December 4, 2021*; 7:00 p.m.		Stetson	W 72–65	8–1	Ocean Bank Convocation Center; Miami, FL
December 11, 2021*; 1:00 p.m., ESPN+		at Eastern Michigan	L 88–92 ^{4OT}	8–2	George Gervin GameAbove Center; Ypsilanti, MI
December 15, 2021*; 7:00 p.m., ESPN+		at Jacksonville State	L 59–66	8–3	Pete Mathews Coliseum; Jacksonville, AL
December 19, 2021*; 12:00 p.m., ESPN+		Bethune–Cookman	Canceled due to COVID-19 concerns		Ocean Bank Convocation Center; Miami, FL
December 20, 2021*; 7:00 p.m., CUSA.tv		Albany State	Canceled due to COVID-19 concerns		Ocean Bank Convocation Center; Miami, FL
December 21, 2021*; 7:00 p.m.		Houston Baptist	Canceled due to COVID-19 concerns		Ocean Bank Convocation Center; Miami, FL
December 30, 2021; 7:00 p.m., CUSA.tv		Old Dominion	L 77–82	8–4 (0–1)	Ocean Bank Convocation Center (158); Miami, FL
January 1, 2022*; 2:00 p.m., CUSA.tv		St. Thomas (FL)	W 95–72	9–4	Ocean Bank Convocation Center; Miami, FL
January 5, 2022*; 1:00 p.m., CUSA.tv		Bethune–Cookman; Rescheduled from December 19	W 68–65	10–4	Ocean Bank Convocation Center (107); Miami, FL
January 8, 2022; 3:00 p.m., ESPN+		at Western Kentucky	L 71–84	10–5 (0–2)	E. A. Diddle Arena; Bowling Green, KY
January 13, 2022; 7:30 p.m., ESPN+		at UAB	L 56–84	10–6 (0–3)	Bartow Arena (2,995); Birmingham, AL
January 15, 2022; 6:00 p.m., ESPN+		at Middle Tennessee	L 39–50	10–7 (0–4)	Murphy Center (3,122); Murfreesboro, TN
January 20, 2022; 7:00 p.m., ESPN+		Marshall	W 70–66	11–7 (1–4)	Ocean Bank Convocation Center (0); Miami, FL
January 22, 2022; 7:00 p.m., ESPN+		Western Kentucky	W 86–83	12–7 (2–4)	Ocean Bank Convocation Center (2,712); Miami, FL
January 27, 2022; 9:00 p.m., ESPN+		at UTSA	L 66–73	12–8 (2–5)	Convocation Center (801); San Antonio, TX
January 29, 2022; 9:00 p.m., CUSA.tv		at UTEP	L 68–79	12–9 (2–6)	Don Haskins Center (4,864); El Paso, TX
February 3, 2022; 7:00 p.m., CUSA.tv		Southern Miss	W 77–67	13–9 (3–6)	Ocean Bank Convocation Center (2,874); Miami, FL
February 5, 2022; 7:00 p.m., ESPN+		Louisiana Tech	L 82–86	13–10 (3–7)	Ocean Bank Convocation Center (4,276); Miami, FL
February 7, 2022; 5:00 p.m., CUSA.tv		Charlotte; Rescheduled from January 1	L 68–81	13–11 (3–8)	Ocean Bank Convocation Center (1,364); Miami, FL
February 10, 2022; 7:00 p.m., ESPN+		at Marshall	W 72–71	14–11 (4–8)	Cam Henderson Center (3,779); Huntington, WV
February 17, 2022; 7:00 p.m., CUSA.tv		Middle Tennessee	L 65–71	14–12 (4–9)	Ocean Bank Convocation Center (2,783); Miami, FL
February 19, 2022; 7:00 p.m., ESPN+		Rice	W 80–78	15–12 (5–9)	Ocean Bank Convocation Center (2,349); Miami, FL
February 24, 2022; 7:00 p.m., ESPN+		at Charlotte	L 55–64	15–13 (5–10)	Dale F. Halton Arena (2,483); Charlotte, NC
February 26, 2022; 7:00 p.m., ESPN+		at Old Dominion	L 63–83	15–14 (5–11)	Chartway Arena (5,342); Norfolk, VA
March 3, 2022; 7:00 p.m., ESPN+		Florida Atlantic	L 51–71	15–15 (5–12)	Ocean Bank Convocation Center (3,763); Miami, FL
March 5, 2022; 2:00 p.m., ESPN+		at Florida Atlantic	L 76–84	15–16 (5–13)	FAU Arena (2,027); Boca Raton, FL
Conference USA tournament
March 8, 2022; 7:00 p.m., ESPN+	(E6)	vs. (E7) Marshall; First round	L 62–74	15–17	Ford Center at The Star; Frisco, TX
*Non-conference game. ^{#}Rankings from AP poll. (#) Tournament seedings in parentheses. All times are in Eastern.
