= 2021–22 Southern Miss Golden Eagles basketball team =

American college basketball season

2021–22 Southern Miss Golden Eagles basketball
- Conference: Conference USA
- West Division
- Record: 7–26 (1–17 C-USA)
- Head coach: Jay Ladner (3rd season)
- Assistant coaches: Kyle Roane; Clarence Weatherspoon; Anthony Winchester
- Home arena: Reed Green Coliseum

2021–22 Conference USA men's basketball standings
	Conf.				Overall
Team	W		L	PCT	W		L	PCT
East
Middle Tennessee	13	–	5	.722	26	–	11	.703
Western Kentucky	11	–	7	.611	19	–	13	.594
Florida Atlantic	11	–	7	.611	19	–	15	.559
Charlotte	10	–	8	.556	17	–	14	.548
Old Dominion	8	–	10	.444	13	–	19	.406
FIU	5	–	13	.278	15	–	17	.469
Marshall	4	–	14	.222	12	–	21	.364
West
North Texas	16	–	2	.889	25	–	7	.781
UAB †	14	–	4	.778	27	–	8	.771
Louisiana Tech	12	–	6	.667	24	–	10	.706
UTEP	11	–	7	.611	20	–	14	.588
Rice	7	–	11	.389	16	–	17	.485
UTSA	3	–	15	.167	10	–	22	.313
Southern Miss	1	–	17	.056	7	–	26	.212
† 2022 C-USA Tournament winner

The 2021–22 Southern Miss Golden Eagles basketball team represented the University of Southern Mississippi during the 2021–22 NCAA Division I men's basketball season. The team was led by third-year head coach Jay Ladner, and played their home games at Reed Green Coliseum in Hattiesburg, Mississippi as members of Conference USA (C-USA).

On October 28, 2021, Southern Miss announced that this would be the last season for the team in the C-USA and they would become a member of the Sun Belt Conference on July 1, 2022.

== Previous season ==
In a season limited due to the ongoing COVID-19 pandemic, the Golden Eagles finished the 2020–21 season 8–17, 4–13 in C-USA play last place in West Division. They lost in the first round of the C-USA tournament to Rice.

== Offseason ==
=== Departures ===
Name	Number	Pos.	Height	Weight	Year	Hometown	Reason for departure
Justin Johnson	2	G/F	6'6"	185	Junior	Fort Lauderdale, FL	Transferred to Texas–Rio Grande Valley
LaDavius Draine	11	G	6'4"	210	Senior	Calhoun City, MS	Graduate transferred to Tulsa
Javarzia Belton	20	F	6'10"	275	Freshman	Calhoun Falls, SC	Left the team for personal reasons
Jay Malone	21	G	6'0"	167	RS Junior	Meridian, MS	Left the team for personal reasons
Artur Konotsuk	34	F	6'8"	213	Sophomore	Pärnu, Estonia	Left the team for personal reasons

=== Incoming transfers ===
Name	Number	Pos.	Height	Weight	Year	Hometown	Previous School
Walyn Napper	1	G	6'0"	170	Sophomore	Columbia, SC	Dodge City CC
Isaih Moore	11	F	6'10"	205	Junior	Columbia, SC	St. John's
Mo Arnold	12	G	6'2"	180	Sophomore	Picayune, MS	Jacksonville
Tate Ryder	25	G	6'0"	170	Sophomore	Hattiesburg, MS	East Central CC

=== 2021 recruiting class ===
College recruiting information
Name	Hometown	School	Height	Weight	Commit date
Rashad Bolden; PG	Ridgeland, MS	St. Andrews Episcopal School	5 ft 11 in (1.80 m)	160 lb (73 kg)	Apr 14, 2021
Rashad Bolden; PG	Recruit ratings: No ratings found				
Overall recruit ranking:
Note: In many cases, Scout, Rivals, 247Sports, On3, and ESPN may conflict in their listings of height and weight.; In these cases, the average was taken. ESPN grades are on a 100-point scale.; Sources: "2021 Team Ranking". Rivals.

== Roster ==
2021–22 Southern Miss Golden Eagles men's basketball team
Players
Coaches

Pos.	#	Name	Height	Weight	Year	Previous school	Hometown
F	0	Tyler Morman	6 ft 8 in (2.03 m)	220 lb (100 kg)	RS Jr	Wyoming	Mableton, GA
G	1	Walyn Napper	6 ft 0 in (1.83 m)	182 lb (83 kg)	So	Dodge City CC	Columbia, SC
F	2	Denijay Harris	6 ft 6 in (1.98 m)	203 lb (92 kg)	RS So	SW Mississippi CC	Columbus, MS
G	3	Blake Roberts (W)	6 ft 2 in (1.88 m)	187 lb (85 kg)	Fr	Oak Grove HS	Hattiesburg, MS
G	4	Rashad Bolden	6 ft 0 in (1.83 m)	168 lb (76 kg)	Fr	St. Andrews	Jackson, MS
F	5	DeAndre Pinckney	6 ft 8 in (2.03 m)	206 lb (93 kg)	Jr	Broward College	Carol City, FL
G	10	Tae Hardy	6 ft 3 in (1.91 m)	191 lb (87 kg)	Jr	Pearl River CC	Ellenwood, GA
F	11	Isaih Moore	6 ft 10 in (2.08 m)	197 lb (89 kg)	Jr	St. John's	Columbia, SC
G	12	Mo Arnold	6 ft 1 in (1.85 m)	195 lb (88 kg)	So	Jacksonville	Picayune, MS
F	14	Tyler Stevenson	6 ft 8 in (2.03 m)	215 lb (98 kg)	Jr	New Hope HS	Columbus, MS
G	21	Trey Alfonso (W)	6 ft 1 in (1.85 m)	165 lb (75 kg)	Fr	Fontainebleau HS	Chalmette, LA
G	22	Jeffery Armstrong	6 ft 0 in (1.83 m)	175 lb (79 kg)	RS Fr	Massanutten Military Academy	Rainsville, AL
G	25	Tate Ryder (W)	6 ft 0 in (1.83 m)	175 lb (79 kg)	So	East Central CC	Oak Grove, MS
G	44	Mark Jaakson	6 ft 7 in (2.01 m)	216 lb (98 kg)	Fr	Get Better Academy	Tallinn, Estonia
G	55	Jaron Pierre Jr.	6 ft 5 in (1.96 m)	182 lb (83 kg)	Fr	St. Augustine HS	New Orleans, LA

Head coach

- Jay Ladner (Southern Miss)

Assistant coach(es)

- Kyle Roane (Southern Miss)
- Clarence Weatherspoon (Southern Miss)
- Anthony Winchester (Western Kentucky)

Legend

- (C) Team captain
- (S) Suspended
- (I) Ineligible
- (W) Walk-on
- Injured
- Current redshirt

Roster

== Schedule and results ==
Date time, TV	Rank^{#}	Opponent^{#}	Result	Record	Site (attendance) city, state
Exhibition
November 4, 2021*; 7:00 p.m., CUSA.tv		Delta State	W 68–60		Reed Green Coliseum (706); Hattiesburg, MS
Regular season
November 9, 2021*; 7:00 p.m., CUSA.tv		William Carey	W 81–67	1–0	Reed Green Coliseum (2,959); Hattiesburg, MS
November 12, 2021*; 7:00 p.m., CUSA.tv		Louisiana	L 45–66	1–1	Reed Green Coliseum (3,574); Hattiesburg, MS
November 16, 2021*; 7:00 p.m., Big 12 Now		at TCU	L 51–83	1–2	Schollmaier Arena (4,915); Fort Worth, TX
November 21, 2021*; 2:00 p.m., CUSA.tv		Lamar	W 82–75	2–2	Reed Green Coliseum (3,037); Hattiesburg, MS
November 24, 2021*; 6:00 p.m.		vs. UNC Wilmington; Zootown Classic	W 80–66	3–2	Dahlberg Arena; Missoula, MT
November 25, 2021*; 6:00 p.m.		vs. UC San Diego; Zootown Classic	W 56–55	4–2	Dahlberg Arena (127); Missoula, MT
November 26, 2021*; 8:30 p.m., ESPN+		at Montana; Zootown Classic	L 62–74	4–3	Dahlberg Arena (3,135); Missoula, MT
December 1, 2021*; 7:00 p.m., ESPN+		at South Alabama	L 55–85	4–4	Mitchell Center (2,418); Mobile, AL
December 4, 2021*; 9:00 p.m., ESPN+		at Southern Illinois	L 41–66	4–5	Banterra Center (4,513); Carbondale, IL
December 11, 2021*; 2:00 p.m., CUSA.tv		Loyola (New Orleans)	Postponed (Note: Game was postponed due to the COVID-19 pandemic related issues.)		Reed Green Coliseum; Hattiesburg, MS
December 14, 2021*; 7:00 p.m., CUSA.tv		Jacksonville	L 51–62	4–6	Reed Green Coliseum (3,057); Hattiesburg, MS
December 18, 2021*; 2:00 p.m., ESPN+		at Louisiana–Monroe	L 65–74	4–7	Fant–Ewing Coliseum (1,423); Monroe, LA
December 21, 2021*; 11:00 a.m., ESPN+		at East Carolina	L 67–68	4–8	Williams Arena (2,054); Greenville, NC
January 6, 2022; 7:00 p.m., CUSA.tv		at UTSA	W 74–73	5–8 (1–0)	Convocation Center (718); San Antonio, TX
January 8, 2022; 8:00 p.m., CUSA.tv		at UTEP	L 54–87	5–9 (1–1)	Don Haskins Center (3,841); El Paso, TX
January 13, 2022; 6:00 p.m., CBSSN		at Louisiana Tech	L 57–80	5–10 (1–2)	Thomas Assembly Center (2,731); Ruston, LA
January 16, 2022; 2:00 p.m., ESPN+		Louisiana Tech	L 62–76	5–11 (1–3)	Reed Green Coliseum (3,110); Hattiesburg, MS
January 19, 2022*; 7:00 p.m., ESPN+		Southeastern Baptist	W 100–50	6–11	Reed Green Coliseum (3,056); Hattiesburg, MS
January 22, 2022; 1:00 p.m., CUSA.tv		at Middle Tennessee	L 60–74	6–12 (1–4)	Murphy Center (3,512); Murfreesboro, TN
January 27, 2022; 7:00 p.m., ESPN+		North Texas	L 54–63	6–13 (1–5)	Reed Green Coliseum (3,205); Hattiesburg, MS
January 29, 2022; 2:00 p.m., ESPN+		Rice	L 62–76	6–14 (1–6)	Reed Green Coliseum (3,074); Hattiesburg, MS
February 3, 2022; 6:00 p.m., CUSA.tv		at FIU	L 67–77	6–15 (1–7)	Ocean Bank Convocation Center (2,874); Miami, FL
February 5, 2022; 3:00 p.m., ESPN+		at Florida Atlantic	L 57–84	6–16 (1–8)	FAU Arena (1,366); Boca Raton, FL
February 10, 2022; 6:00 p.m., CBSSN		at UAB	L 63–84	6–17 (1–9)	Bartow Arena (3,638); Birmingham, AL
February 14, 2022; 7:00 p.m., ESPN+		Western Kentucky; Rescheduled from December 30	L 77–87	6–18 (1–10)	Reed Green Coliseum (2,726); Hattiesburg, MS
February 17, 2022; 7:00 p.m., ESPN+		UTSA	L 79–98 ^{OT}	6–19 (1–11)	Reed Green Coliseum (3,339); Hattiesburg, MS
February 19, 2022; 2:00 p.m., ESPN+		UTEP	L 70–84	6–20 (1–12)	Reed Green Coliseum (2,861); Hattiesburg, MS
February 21, 2022; 7:00 p.m., ESPN+		Marshall; Rescheduled from January 1	L 60–74	6–21 (1–13)	Reed Green Coliseum (2,690); Hattiesburg, MS
February 24, 2022; 7:00 p.m., ESPN+		at North Texas	L 61–85	6–22 (1–14)	The Super Pit (4,150); Denton, TX
February 26, 2022; 6:00 p.m., CUSA.tv		at Rice	L 72–77 ^{OT}	6–23 (1–15)	Tudor Fieldhouse (4,087); Houston, TX
March 2, 2022; 7:00 p.m., ESPN+		UAB	L 68–81	6–24 (1–16)	Reed Green Coliseum (2,680); Hattiesburg, MS
March 5, 2022; 2:00 p.m., ESPN+		Charlotte	L 67–70	6–25 (1–17)	Reed Green Coliseum (2,840); Hattiesburg, MS
C-USA tournament
March 8, 2022; 6:30 p.m., ESPN+	(W7)	vs. (W6) UTSA; First round	W 67–64	7–25	Ford Center at The Star; Frisco, TX
March 9, 2022; 8:30 p.m., ESPN+	(W7)	vs. (E3) Florida Atlantic; Second round	L 59–86	7–26	Ford Center at The Star; Frisco, TX
*Non-conference game. ^{#}Rankings from AP Poll. (#) Tournament seedings in parentheses. All times are in Central.

== See also ==
- 2021–22 Southern Miss Lady Eagles basketball team
