= 2021–22 Rice Owls men's basketball team =

American college basketball season

2021–22 Rice Owls men's basketball

CBI, First Round
- Conference: Conference USA
- West Division
- Record: 16–17 (7–11 CUSA)
- Head coach: Scott Pera (5th season)
- Assistant coaches: Van Green; Derek Glasser; Greg Howell
- Home arena: Tudor Fieldhouse

2021–22 Conference USA men's basketball standings
	Conf.				Overall
Team	W		L	PCT	W		L	PCT
East
Middle Tennessee	13	–	5	.722	26	–	11	.703
Western Kentucky	11	–	7	.611	19	–	13	.594
Florida Atlantic	11	–	7	.611	19	–	15	.559
Charlotte	10	–	8	.556	17	–	14	.548
Old Dominion	8	–	10	.444	13	–	19	.406
FIU	5	–	13	.278	15	–	17	.469
Marshall	4	–	14	.222	12	–	21	.364
West
North Texas	16	–	2	.889	25	–	7	.781
UAB †	14	–	4	.778	27	–	8	.771
Louisiana Tech	12	–	6	.667	24	–	10	.706
UTEP	11	–	7	.611	20	–	14	.588
Rice	7	–	11	.389	16	–	17	.485
UTSA	3	–	15	.167	10	–	22	.313
Southern Miss	1	–	17	.056	7	–	26	.212
† 2022 C-USA Tournament winner

The 2021–22 Rice Owls men's basketball team represented Rice University during the 2021–22 NCAA Division I men's basketball season. The team was led by fifth-year head coach Scott Pera, and played their home games at Tudor Fieldhouse in Houston, Texas as members of Conference USA.

== Previous season ==
The Owls finished the 2020–21 season 15–13, 6–10 in C-USA play to finish in sixth place in West Division. They defeated Southern Miss in first round and Marshall in the second before losing to UAB in the quarterfinals.

== Offseason ==
=== Departures ===
Name	Number	Pos.	Height	Weight	Year	Hometown	Reason for departure
Payton Moore	0	G	6'4"	215	Junior	Los Angeles, CA	Graduate transferred to Denver
Malik Ondigo	10	F	6'10"	215	RS Junior	El Mirage, AZ	Left the team for personal reasons
Tre Clark	22	G	6'5"	205	GS Senior	Palmetto, FL	Left the team for personal reasons
Cavit Ege Havsa	55	G	6'5"	180	GS Senior	Istanbul, Turkey	Graduated

=== Incoming transfers ===
Name	Number	Pos.	Height	Weight	Year	Hometown	Previous School
Carl Pierre	12	G	6'4"	190	Senior	Boston, MA	UMass
Terrance McBride	13	G	6'2"	170	Senior	Lynwood, CA	Cornell

=== 2021 recruiting class ===
College recruiting information
Name	Hometown	School	Height	Weight	Commit date
Jaden Geron; SG	Fresno, CA	San Joaquin Memorial High School	6 ft 8 in (2.03 m)	175 lb (79 kg)	Apr 20, 2020
Jaden Geron; SG	Recruit ratings: No ratings found				
Damion McDowell; PF	Los Angeles, CA	Dorsey High School	6 ft 6 in (1.98 m)	190 lb (86 kg)	Apr 30, 2020
Damion McDowell; PF	Recruit ratings: No ratings found				
Overall recruit ranking:
Note: In many cases, Scout, Rivals, 247Sports, On3, and ESPN may conflict in their listings of height and weight.; In these cases, the average was taken. ESPN grades are on a 100-point scale.; Sources: "2021 Team Ranking". Rivals.

=== 2022 recruiting class ===
College recruiting information (2022)
Name	Hometown	School	Height	Weight	Commit date
Mekhi Mason; SG	Chandler, AZ	AZ Compass Prep School	6 ft 5 in (1.96 m)	N/A	Sep 12, 2020
Mekhi Mason; SG	Recruit ratings: No ratings found				
Mason Jones; SG	Chicago, IL	Link Year Preparatory School	6 ft 4 in (1.93 m)	175 lb (79 kg)	Oct 6, 2021
Mason Jones; SG	Recruit ratings: No ratings found				
Andrew Akuchie; PF	Plantation, FL	St. Thomas Aquinas High School	6 ft 8 in (2.03 m)	195 lb (88 kg)	Jun 13, 2021
Andrew Akuchie; PF	Recruit ratings: No ratings found				
Overall recruit ranking:
Note: In many cases, Scout, Rivals, 247Sports, On3, and ESPN may conflict in their listings of height and weight.; In these cases, the average was taken. ESPN grades are on a 100-point scale.; Sources: "2022 Team Ranking". Rivals.

== Roster ==
2021–22 Rice Owls men's basketball team
Players
Coaches

Pos.	#	Name	Height	Weight	Year	Previous school	Hometown
G	0	Jaden Geron	6 ft 8 in (2.03 m)	175 lb (79 kg)	Fr	San Joaquin Memorial	Fresno, CA
G	1	Noah Hutchins	6 ft 1 in (1.85 m)	195 lb (88 kg)	Fr	IMG Academy	Buffalo, NY
G	2	Jake Lieppert	6 ft 4 in (1.93 m)	200 lb (91 kg)	So	Saguaro HS; Pima CC	Scottsdale, AZ
G	3	Travis Evee	6 ft 1 in (1.85 m)	180 lb (82 kg)	So	Vermont Academy; VMI	Randolph, MA
G	4	Quincy Olivari	6 ft 3 in (1.91 m)	200 lb (91 kg)	So	Westlake HS	Atlanta, GA
G/F	5	Cameron Sheffield	6 ft 6 in (1.98 m)	200 lb (91 kg)	Fr	Chattahoochee HS	Alpharetta, GA
F	10	Ben Moffat (W)	6 ft 8 in (2.03 m)	225 lb (102 kg)	So	Rider HS	Wichita Falls, TX
F	11	Riley Abercrombie	6 ft 10 in (2.08 m)	210 lb (95 kg)	RS So	Clear Lake HS; Boise State	Wollongong, Australia
G	12	Carl Pierre	6 ft 4 in (1.93 m)	190 lb (86 kg)	GS	Boston College HS	Boston, MA
G	13	Terrance McBride	6 ft 2 in (1.88 m)	170 lb (77 kg)	Sr	Sierra Canyon; Cornell	Lynwood, CA
G	14	Reed Myers (W)	6 ft 0 in (1.83 m)	180 lb (82 kg)	So	Scottsdale Christian Academy	Phoenix
F	15	Max Fiedler	6 ft 10 in (2.08 m)	235 lb (107 kg)	So	Melbourne HS	Indialantic, FL
F	20	Damion McDowell, Jr.	6 ft 6 in (1.98 m)	190 lb (86 kg)	Fr	St. Bernard Catholic School	Inglewood, CA
G	22	Jackson Peakes (W)	6 ft 4 in (1.93 m)	182 lb (83 kg)	Fr	St. John's HS	Houston, TX
G	24	Chris Mullins	6 ft 3 in (1.91 m)	190 lb (86 kg)	Jr	Mansfield Timberview HS	Grand Paririe, TX
F	34	Mylyjael Poteat	6 ft 9 in (2.06 m)	260 lb (118 kg)	So	The Burlington School	Reidsville, NC

Head coach

- Scott Pera (Penn State)

Assistant coach(es)

- Vince Alexander (Oklahoma Baptist)
- Van Green (Rice)
- Greg Howell (Waldorf)

Legend

- (C) Team captain
- (S) Suspended
- (I) Ineligible
- (W) Walk-on
- Injured
- Current redshirt

Roster

== Schedule and results ==
Date time, TV	Rank^{#}	Opponent^{#}	Result	Record	Site (attendance) city, state
Exhibition
November 4, 2021*; 7:00 p.m.		St. Edward's	W 85–71	–	Tudor Fieldhouse; Houston, TX
Regular season
November 9, 2021*; 7:00 p.m., ESPN+		Pepperdine	W 82–63	1–0	Tudor Fieldhouse (1,796); Houston, TX
November 12, 2021*; 7:00 p.m., ESPN+		at No. 15 Houston; Rivalry	L 46–79	1–1	Fertitta Center (6,967); Houston, TX
November 16, 2021*; 7:00 p.m., CUSAtv		Southern	W 81–63	2–1	Tudor Fieldhouse (1,565); Houston, TX
November 19, 2021*; 7:00 p.m., ESPN+		at New Orleans	W 83–78	3–1	Lakefront Arena (959); New Orleans, LA
November 22, 2021*; 10:00 a.m., FloHoops		vs. Evansville; Gulf Coast Showcase quarterfinal	W 109–104 ^{3OT}	4–1	Hertz Arena (435); Fort Myers, FL
November 23, 2021*; 4:00 p.m., FloHoops		vs. Oakland; Gulf Coast Showcase semifinal	L 73–76	4–2	Hertz Arena (270); Fort Myers, FL
November 24, 2021*; 4:00 p.m., FloHoops		vs. Fordham; Gulf Coast Showcase 3rd place game	L 74–84	4–3	Hertz Arena (150); Fort Myers, FL
November 30, 2021*; 7:00 p.m., CUSAtv		Texas State	L 69–80	4–4	Tudor Fieldhouse (1,365); Houston, TX
December 4, 2021*; 2:00 p.m., CUSAtv		Jarvis Christian	W 100–62	5–4	Tudor Fieldhouse (1,283); Houston, TX
December 11, 2021*; 7:00 p.m., Husky Sports Network		at Houston Baptist	W 88–73	6–4	Sharp Gymnasium (703); Houston, TX
December 16, 2021*; 11:15 a.m., CUSAtv		Incarnate Word	W 85–55	7–4	Tudor Fieldhouse (2,021); Houston, TX
December 19, 2021*; 2:00 p.m., CUSAtv		St. Thomas (TX)	Postponed due to COVID-19 concerns		Tudor Fieldhouse; Houston, TX
January 1, 2022; 5:00 p.m., ESPN+/YouTube		at North Texas	L 43–75	7–5 (0–1)	The Super Pit (2,409); Denton, TX
January 6, 2022; 7:00 p.m., CUSAtv		Middle Tennessee	W 65–61	8–5 (1–1)	Tudor Fieldhouse (500); Houston, TX
January 8, 2022; 3:00 p.m., YouTube		UAB	W 85–80	9–5 (2–1)	Tudor Fieldhouse (500); Houston, TX
January 13, 2022; 8:00 p.m., CBSSN		at Western Kentucky	L 66–80	9–6 (2–2)	E. A. Diddle Arena (2,933); Bowling Green, KY
January 15, 2022; 6:00 p.m., ESPN+		at Marshall	W 87–77	10–6 (3–2)	Cam Henderson Center (4,239); Huntington, WV
January 20, 2022; 7:00 p.m., CUSAtv		Old Dominion	W 77–69	11–6 (4–2)	Tudor Fieldhouse (1,407); Houston, TX
January 22, 2022; 2:00 p.m., ESPN+		Charlotte	L 64–67	11–7 (4–3)	Tudor Fieldhouse (1,641); Houston, TX
January 27, 2022; 6:30 p.m., ESPN+		at Louisiana Tech	L 63–80	11–8 (4–4)	Thomas Assembly Center (2,634); Ruston, LA
January 29, 2022; 2:00 p.m., ESPN3/ESPN+		at Southern Miss	W 76–62	12–8 (5–4)	Reed Green Coliseum (3,074); Hattiesburg, MS
February 3, 2022; 7:00 p.m., CUSAtv		UTSA	W 91–78	13–8 (6–4)	Tudor Fieldhouse (1,638); Houston, TX
February 5, 2022; 2:00 p.m., CUSAtv		UTEP	L 70–72	13–9 (6–5)	Tudor Fieldhouse (1,872); Houston, TX
February 8, 2022*; 2:00 p.m., CUSAtv		Jarvis Christian	W 98–63	14–9	Tudor Fieldhouse (2,775); Houston, TX
February 12, 2022; 2:00 p.m., CUSAtv		North Texas	L 44–67	14–10 (6–6)	Tudor Fieldhouse (2,102); Houston, TX
February 17, 2022; 7:00 p.m., Stadium		at UAB	L 68–92	14–11 (6–7)	Bartow Arena (2,643); Birmingham, AL
February 19, 2022; 6:00 p.m., ESPN+		at FIU	L 78–80	14–12 (6–8)	Ocean Bank Convocation Center (2,349); Miami, FL
February 24, 2022; 7:00 p.m., Stadium		Louisiana Tech	L 79–83	14–13 (6–9)	Tudor Fieldhouse (2,226); Houston, TX
February 26, 2022; 6:00 p.m., CUSAtv		Southern Miss	W 77–72 ^{OT}	15–13 (7–9)	Tudor Fieldhouse (4,087); Houston, TX
March 3, 2022; 8:00 p.m., CBSSN		at UTEP	L 67–70	15–14 (7–10)	Don Haskins Center (4,645); El Paso, TX
March 5, 2022; 7:00 p.m., ESPN+		at UTSA	L 71–82	15–15 (7–11)	Convocation Center (1,014); San Antonio, TX
Conference USA tournament
March 9, 2022; 5:30 p.m., ESPN+	(W5)	vs. (E4) Charlotte; Second round	W 73–61	16–15	Ford Center at The Star; Frisco, TX
March 10, 2022; 5:30 p.m., Stadium	(W5)	vs. (W1) North Texas; Quarterfinals	L 50–68	16–16	Ford Center at The Star; Frisco, TX
College Basketball Invitational
March 19, 2022; 7:30 p.m., FloHoops	(14)	vs. (3) Ohio	L 64–65	16–17	Ocean Center (799); Daytona Beach, FL
*Non-conference game. ^{#}Rankings from AP Poll. (#) Tournament seedings in parentheses. All times are in Central.

== See also ==
- 2021–22 Rice Owls women's basketball team
