= 2021–22 UTSA Roadrunners men's basketball team =

American college basketball season

2021–22 UTSA Roadrunners men's basketball
- Conference: Conference USA
- West Division
- Record: 10–22 (3–15 C-USA)
- Head coach: Steve Henson (6th season)
- Associate head coach: Mike Peck
- Assistant coaches: Scott Thompson; Adam Hood
- Home arena: Convocation Center

2021–22 Conference USA men's basketball standings
	Conf.				Overall
Team	W		L	PCT	W		L	PCT
East
Middle Tennessee	13	–	5	.722	26	–	11	.703
Western Kentucky	11	–	7	.611	19	–	13	.594
Florida Atlantic	11	–	7	.611	19	–	15	.559
Charlotte	10	–	8	.556	17	–	14	.548
Old Dominion	8	–	10	.444	13	–	19	.406
FIU	5	–	13	.278	15	–	17	.469
Marshall	4	–	14	.222	12	–	21	.364
West
North Texas	16	–	2	.889	25	–	7	.781
UAB †	14	–	4	.778	27	–	8	.771
Louisiana Tech	12	–	6	.667	24	–	10	.706
UTEP	11	–	7	.611	20	–	14	.588
Rice	7	–	11	.389	16	–	17	.485
UTSA	3	–	15	.167	10	–	22	.313
Southern Miss	1	–	17	.056	7	–	26	.212
† 2022 C-USA Tournament winner

The 2021–22 UTSA Roadrunners men's basketball team represented the University of Texas at San Antonio in the 2021–22 NCAA Division I men's basketball season. The Roadrunners, led by sixth-year head coach Steve Henson, played their home games at the Convocation Center in San Antonio, Texas as a member of Conference USA's West Division.

== Previous season ==
The Roadrunners finished the 2020–21 season 15–11, 9–7 in C-USA play to finish in fourth place in the West Division. In the C-USA tournament, they defeated Charlotte in the second round, before falling to Western Kentucky in the quarterfinals.

== Offseason ==
=== Departures ===
Name	Number	Pos.	Height	Weight	Year	Hometown	Reason for departure
Jaja Sanni	1	G/F	6'4"	175	Freshman	Houston, TX	Transferred
Jhivvan Jackson	2	G	6'0"	170	Senior	Bayamón, PR	Graduated
Eric Parrish	15	G/F	6'6"	195	RS Junior	Cypress, TX	Graduate transferred to Grambling State
Keaton Wallace	22	G	6'4"	195	Senior	Dallas, TX	Graduated/went undrafted in 2021 NBA draft

=== Incoming transfers ===
Name	Number	Pos.	Height	Weight	Year	Hometown	Previous School
Darius McNeill	1	G	6'3"	185	RS Senior	Houston, TX	SMU
Aleu Aleu	2	F	6'8"	175	Junior	Austin, TX	Temple College
Dhieu Deing	3	G	6'5"	185	Junior	High Point, NC	Dodge City CC

=== Class of 2021 recruits ===
College recruiting information
Name	Hometown	School	Height	Weight	Commit date
Josh Farmer; SF	Houston, TX	Sharptown High School	6 ft 9 in (2.06 m)	180 lb (82 kg)	Apr 16, 2021
Josh Farmer; SF	Recruit ratings: Scout: Rivals: 247Sports:				
Lamin Sabally; SF	Scottsdale, AZ	Bella Vista Prep	6 ft 7 in (2.01 m)	180 lb (82 kg)	Nov 16, 2020
Lamin Sabally; SF	Recruit ratings: No ratings found				
Azavier Johnson; SG	Las Vegas, NV	Faith Lutheran High School	6 ft 5 in (1.96 m)	185 lb (84 kg)	Nov 16, 2020
Azavier Johnson; SG	Recruit ratings: No ratings found				
Overall recruit ranking:
Note: In many cases, Scout, Rivals, 247Sports, On3, and ESPN may conflict in their listings of height and weight.; In these cases, the average was taken. ESPN grades are on a 100-point scale.; Sources: "2021 Team Ranking". Rivals.

== Roster ==
2021–22 UTSA Roadrunners men's basketball team
Players
Coaches

Pos.	#	Name	Height	Weight	Year	Previous school	Hometown
F	0	Cedrick Alley Jr.	6 ft 6 in (1.98 m)	230 lb (104 kg)	RS Sr	Houston	Houston, TX
G	1	Darius McNeill	6 ft 3 in (1.91 m)	185 lb (84 kg)	Sr	SMU	Houston, TX
G/F	2	Aleu Aleu	6 ft 8 in (2.03 m)	180 lb (82 kg)	Jr	Temple College	Austin, TX
G	3	Dhieu Deing	6 ft 5 in (1.96 m)	175 lb (79 kg)	Jr	Dodge City CC	High Point, NC
F	4	Josh Farmer	6 ft 9 in (2.06 m)	195 lb (88 kg)	Fr	Sharpstown HS	Houston, TX
G	5	Azavier Johnson	6 ft 5 in (1.96 m)	205 lb (93 kg)	Fr	Faith Lutheran HS	Las Vegas, NV
G	10	Erik Czumbel	6 ft 3 in (1.91 m)	200 lb (91 kg)	Jr	Liceo Leonardo da Vinci	Verona, Italy
F	11	Lachlan Bofinger	6 ft 6 in (1.98 m)	215 lb (98 kg)	So	Montverde Academy	Sydney, Australia
F	12	Phoenix Ford	6 ft 8 in (2.03 m)	225 lb (102 kg)	RS Sr	Mississippi Gulf Coast	St. Petersburg, FL
G	13	Artan Jabbar	6 ft 0 in (1.83 m)	180 lb (82 kg)	Jr	Dallas Baptist	Fort Worth, TX
G	20	Lamin Sabally	6 ft 7 in (2.01 m)	195 lb (88 kg)	Fr	Bella Vista Prep	Berlin, Germany
G	21	Jordan Ivy-Curry	6 ft 2 in (1.88 m)	170 lb (77 kg)	So	La Marque HS	La Marque, TX
G	22	Christian Tucker	6 ft 3 in (1.91 m)	170 lb (77 kg)	Fr	Gilbert Perry HS	Chandler, AZ
C	24	Jacob Germany	6 ft 11 in (2.11 m)	235 lb (107 kg)	Jr	Kingston HS	Kingston, OK
F	25	Adrian Rodriguez	6 ft 7 in (2.01 m)	245 lb (111 kg)	RS Sr	Union HS	Tulsa, OK
G	32	Isaiah Addo-Ankrah	6 ft 6 in (1.98 m)	180 lb (82 kg)	So	Second Baptist School	Houston, TX

Head coach

- Steve Henson (Kansas State)

Assistant coach(es)

- Mike Peck (Northwood)
- Scott Thompson (Mississippi)
- Adam Hood (Air Force)

Legend

- (C) Team captain
- (S) Suspended
- (I) Ineligible
- (W) Walk-on
- Injured
- Current redshirt

Roster
Last update: October 27, 2021

== Schedule and results ==
Date time, TV	Rank^{#}	Opponent^{#}	Result	Record	Site (attendance) city, state
Non-conference regular season
November 9, 2021*; 7:30 pm, CUSA TV		Trinity	W 97–66	1–0	Convocation Center (1,302); San Antonio, TX
November 12, 2021*; 7:00 pm, BSOK		at Oklahoma	L 44–96	1–1	Lloyd Noble Center; Norman, OK
November 15, 2021*; 7:30 pm, CUSA TV		Texas A&M–Commerce; 210 San Antonio Shootout	L 62–65	1–2	Convocation Center (914); San Antonio, TX
November 16, 2021*; 7:30 pm, CUSA TV		Denver; 210 San Antonio Shootout	W 78–64	2–2	Convocation Center (848); San Antonio, TX
November 17, 2021*; 4:30 pm, CUSA TV		IUPUI; 210 San Antonio Shootout	W 60–57	3–2	Convocation Center (678); San Antonio, TX
November 21, 2021*; 3:00 pm, CUSA TV		Texas A&M–Corpus Christi; 210 San Antonio Shootout	L 58–77	3–3	Convocation Center (1,065); San Antonio, TX
November 24, 2021*; 2:00 pm, CUSA TV		Lamar	W 79–73	4–3	Convocation Center (758); San Antonio, TX
November 29, 2021*; 7:00 pm, ESPN+		St. Mary's (TX)	W 75–65	5–3	Convocation Center (970); San Antonio, TX
December 2, 2021*; 8:00 pm, ESPN+		at Grand Canyon	L 71–74	5–4	GCU Arena (6,844); Phoenix, AZ
December 11, 2021*; 3:00 p.m.		vs. Sam Houston State; The Battleground 2K21	W 78–73	6–4	Toyota Center; Houston, TX
December 17, 2021*; 7:00 pm, CUSA TV		Texas–Rio Grande Valley	L 50–68	6–5	Convocation Center (748); San Antonio, TX
December 21, 2021*; 2:00 pm, ESPN+		at Illinois State	L 64–81	6–6	Redbird Arena (2,345); Normal, IL
December 22, 2021*; 7:00 pm, CUSA TV		Our Lady of the Lake	Cancelled due to COVID-19 protocols		Convocation Center; San Antonio, TX
January 1, 2022; 3:00 pm, CUSA TV		at UAB	L 59–87	6–7 (0–1)	Bartow Arena (2,730); Birmingham, AL
January 3, 2022*; 7:00 pm, CUSA TV		Dallas Christian	W 101–48	7–7	Convocation Center (278); San Antonio, TX
January 6, 2022; 7:00 pm, CUSA TV		Southern Miss	L 73–74	7–8 (0–2)	Convocation Center (718); San Antonio, TX
January 8, 2022; 3:00 pm, ESPN+		Louisiana Tech	L 63–79	7–9 (0–3)	Convocation Center (773); San Antonio, TX
January 13, 2022; 6:00 pm, ESPN+		at Old Dominion	L 51–83	7–10 (0–4)	Chartway Arena (4,657); Norfolk, VA
January 15, 2022; 12:00 pm, ESPN+		at Charlotte	L 53–62	7–11 (0–5)	Dale F. Halton Arena (26); Charlotte, NC
January 20, 2022; 8:00 pm, CUSA TV		at UTEP	L 64–69	7–12 (0–6)	Don Haskins Center (5,021); El Paso, TX
January 23, 2022; 3:00 pm, CUSA TV		UTEP	L 54–59	7–13 (0–7)	Convocation Center (924); San Antonio, TX
January 27, 2022; 7:00 pm, ESPN+		FIU	W 73–66	8–13 (1–7)	Convocation Center (801); San Antonio, TX
January 29, 2022; 1:00 pm, ESPN+		Florida Atlantic	L 64–73	8–14 (1–8)	Convocation Center (1,129); San Antonio, TX
February 3, 2022; 7:00 pm, CUSA TV		at Rice	L 78–91	8–15 (1–9)	Tudor Fieldhouse (1,638); Houston, TX
February 5, 2022; 5:00 pm, ESPN+		at North Texas	L 45–69	8–16 (1–10)	The Super Pit (4,227); Denton, TX
February 7, 2022; 6:00 pm, CUSA TV		at Middle Tennessee; Rescheduled from December 30	L 65–74	8–17 (1–11)	Murphy Center (2,802); Murfreesboro, TN
February 12, 2022; 3:00 pm, CUSA TV		Western Kentucky	L 65–71	8–18 (1–12)	Convocation Center (1,123); San Antonio, TX
February 17, 2022; 7:00 pm, ESPN+		at Southern Miss	W 98–79 ^{OT}	9–18 (2–12)	Reed Green Coliseum (3,339); Hattiesburg, MS
February 19, 2022; 4:00 pm, ESPN+		at Louisiana Tech	L 71–95	9–19 (2–13)	Thomas Assembly Center (3,553); Ruston, LA
February 24, 2022; 7:00 pm, ESPN+		UAB	L 56–68	9–20 (2–14)	Convocation Center (805); San Antonio, TX
March 3, 2022; 7:00 pm, ESPN+		North Texas	L 48–59	9–21 (2–15)	Convocation Center (864); San Antonio, TX
March 5, 2022; 2:00 pm, ESPN+		Rice	W 82–71	10–21 (3–15)	Convocation Center (1,014); San Antonio, TX
Conference USA tournament
March 8, 2022; 6:30 pm, ESPN+	(W6)	vs. (W7) Southern Miss; First round	L 64–67	10–22	Ford Center at The Star; Frisco, TX
*Non-conference game. ^{#}Rankings from AP Poll. (#) Tournament seedings in parentheses. All times are in Central.

== See also ==
- 2021–22 UTSA Roadrunners women's basketball team
