= 2021–22 Charlotte 49ers men's basketball team =

American college basketball season

2021–22 Charlotte 49ers men's basketball
- Conference: Conference USA
- East Division
- Record: 17–14 (10–8 CUSA)
- Head coach: Ron Sanchez (4th season)
- Assistant coaches: Aaron Fearne; Kotie Kimble; Vic Sfera
- Home arena: Dale F. Halton Arena

2021–22 Conference USA men's basketball standings
	Conf.				Overall
Team	W		L	PCT	W		L	PCT
East
Middle Tennessee	13	–	5	.722	26	–	11	.703
Western Kentucky	11	–	7	.611	19	–	13	.594
Florida Atlantic	11	–	7	.611	19	–	15	.559
Charlotte	10	–	8	.556	17	–	14	.548
Old Dominion	8	–	10	.444	13	–	19	.406
FIU	5	–	13	.278	15	–	17	.469
Marshall	4	–	14	.222	12	–	21	.364
West
North Texas	16	–	2	.889	25	–	7	.781
UAB †	14	–	4	.778	27	–	8	.771
Louisiana Tech	12	–	6	.667	24	–	10	.706
UTEP	11	–	7	.611	20	–	14	.588
Rice	7	–	11	.389	16	–	17	.485
UTSA	3	–	15	.167	10	–	22	.313
Southern Miss	1	–	17	.056	7	–	26	.212
† 2022 C-USA Tournament winner

The 2021–22 Charlotte 49ers men's basketball team represented the University of North Carolina at Charlotte during the 2021–22 NCAA Division I men's basketball season. The team were led by fourth-year head coach Ron Sanchez, and played their home games at Dale F. Halton Arena in Charlotte, North Carolina as members of Conference USA.

== Previous season ==
The 49ers finished the 2020–21 season 9–16, 5–11 in C-USA play to finish in fifth place in East Division. They lost in the second round of the C-USA tournament to UTSA.

== Offseason ==
=== Departures ===
Name	Number	Pos.	Height	Weight	Year	Hometown	Reason for departure
Caleb Stone-Carrawell	0	G	6'7"	215	RS Freshman	Concord, NC	Transferred to Austin Peay
Caleb Byrd	2	G	6'1"	160	Freshman	Conyers, GA	Transferred to Jacksonville State
Milos Supica	5	F	6'9"	240	Senior	Belgrade, Serbia	Graduated
Jordan Shepherd	13	G	6'4"	190	RS Senior	Asheville, NC	Graduate transferred to California
Jhery Matos	30	G	6'5"	195	Graduate Student	Santo Domingo, DR	Graduated
Anzac Rissetto	31	F/C	6'10"	255	Sophomore	Auckland, New Zealand	Signed to play professionally in New Zealand with Nelson Giants

=== Incoming transfers ===
Name	Number	Pos.	Height	Weight	Year	Hometown	Previous
Clyde Trapp Jr.	0	G	6'4"	200	Graduate Student	Eastover, SC	Clemson
Austin Butler	2	G	6'5"	210	Graduate Student	Lathrobe, PA	Holy Cross
Perry Francois	10	F	6'8"	240	Graduate Student	North Miami, FL	Texas A&M–Corpus Christi
Robert Braswell V	20	F	6'7"	205	RS Junior	Jacksonville, FL	Syracuse
Musa Jallow	21	G	6'5"	210	RS Senior	Bloomington, IN	Ohio State

=== 2021 recruiting class ===
College recruiting information
Name	Hometown	School	Height	Weight	Commit date
Daylen Berry; SG	Cary, NC	Panther Creek High School	6 ft 4 in (1.93 m)	170 lb (77 kg)	Sep 29, 2020
Daylen Berry; SG	Recruit ratings: No ratings found				
Overall recruit ranking:
Note: In many cases, Scout, Rivals, 247Sports, On3, and ESPN may conflict in their listings of height and weight.; In these cases, the average was taken. ESPN grades are on a 100-point scale.; Sources: "2021 Team Ranking". Rivals.

=== 2022 Recruiting class ===
College recruiting information (2022)
Name	Hometown	School	Height	Weight	Commit date
Nik Graves; PG	Greensboro, NC	Greensboro Day School	6 ft 2 in (1.88 m)	170 lb (77 kg)	Oct 15, 2021
Nik Graves; PG	Recruit ratings: No ratings found				
Overall recruit ranking:
Note: In many cases, Scout, Rivals, 247Sports, On3, and ESPN may conflict in their listings of height and weight.; In these cases, the average was taken. ESPN grades are on a 100-point scale.; Sources: "2022 Team Ranking". Rivals.

== Roster ==
2021–22 Charlotte 49ers men's basketball team
Players
Coaches

Pos.	#	Name	Height	Weight	Year	Previous school	Hometown
G	0	Clyde Trapp Jr.	6 ft 4 in (1.93 m)	200 lb (91 kg)	GS	Lower Richland HS; Clemson	Eastover, SC
G	1	Jahmir Young	6 ft 1 in (1.85 m)	185 lb (84 kg)	Jr	DeMatha Catholic HS	Upper Marlboro, MD
G	2	Austin Butler	6 ft 5 in (1.96 m)	210 lb (95 kg)	GS	Greater Latrobe HS; Holy Cross	Latrobe, PA
G	3	Brice Williams	6 ft 7 in (2.01 m)	215 lb (98 kg)	Jr	Hopewell HS	Huntersville, NC
G	5	Marvin Cannon	6 ft 5 in (1.96 m)	170 lb (77 kg)	RS Sr	Steward School; Washington State	Richmond, VA
F	10	Perry Francois	6 ft 8 in (2.03 m)	240 lb (109 kg)	GS	North Miami Sr. HS; Texas A&M–Corpus Christi	North Miami, FL
G	11	Daylen Berry	6 ft 4 in (1.93 m)	170 lb (77 kg)	Fr	Panther Creek HS	Cary, NC
G	12	Jackson Threadgill	6 ft 6 in (1.98 m)	170 lb (77 kg)	So	Davidson Day School	Concord, NC
G	14	Regin Larson (W)	6 ft 6 in (1.98 m)	185 lb (84 kg)	Jr	Hickory Grove Christian School; Pfeiffer	Charlotte, NC
F/C	15	Aly Khalifa	6 ft 11 in (2.11 m)	230 lb (104 kg)	RS Fr	NBA Global Academy	Alexandria, Egypt
F	20	Robert Braswell V	6 ft 7 in (2.01 m)	205 lb (93 kg)	RS Jr	Blythewood HS; Syracuse	Jacksonville, FL
G	21	Musa Jallow	6 ft 5 in (1.96 m)	210 lb (95 kg)	RS Sr	Bloomington North HS; Ohio State	Bloomington, IN
G	24	Isaiah Folkes	6 ft 4 in (1.93 m)	190 lb (86 kg)	RS Fr	Middleburg Academy	Gainesville, VA
F	25	Jared Garcia	6 ft 8 in (2.03 m)	240 lb (109 kg)	So	St. Thomas More School	Houston, TX
G	30	Tyler Ferne (W)	6 ft 6 in (1.98 m)	175 lb (79 kg)	Fr	Concord Academy (NC)	Cairns, Australia
G	35	Luka Vasic	6 ft 8 in (2.03 m)	205 lb (93 kg)	RS Sr	Avon Old Farms	Pirot, Serbia
G	44	Eli Bennett (W)	6 ft 2 in (1.88 m)	160 lb (73 kg)	Fr	St. Anne's-Belfield School	Charlottesville, VA

Head coach

- Ron Sanchez (SUNY Oneonta)

Assistant coach(es)

- Aaron Fearne (Mayville State)
- Kotie Kimble (Coastal Carolina)
- Vic Sfera (Memphis)

Legend

- (C) Team captain
- (S) Suspended
- (I) Ineligible
- (W) Walk-on
- Injured
- Current redshirt

Roster

== Schedule and results ==
Date time, TV	Rank^{#}	Opponent^{#}	Result	Record	Site (attendance) city, state
Exhibition
October 24, 2021*; 3:00 p.m.		Georgia; Charity Exhibition	W 76–65	–	Dale F. Halton Arena; Charlotte, NC
Non-conference regular season
November 9, 2021*; 7:00 p.m., CUSA.tv		Monmouth	W 68–66	1–0	Dale F. Halton Arena (3,023); Charlotte, NC
November 12, 2021*; 7:00 p.m., CUSA.tv		USC Upstate	W 76–64	2–0	Dale F. Halton Arena (2,654); Charlotte, NC
November 18, 2021*; 6:30 p.m., ESPN+		at Appalachian State	W 67–66	3–0	Holmes Center (3,234); Boone, NC
November 22, 2021*; 12:00 p.m., FloSports		vs. Toledo; Nassau Championship quarterfinal	L 86–98	3–1	Baha Mar Convention Center; Nassau, Bahamas
November 23, 2021*; 2:30 p.m., FloSports		vs. Drexel; Nassau Championship Consolation 2nd Round	L 55–67	3–2	Baha Mar Convention Center; Nassau, Bahamas
November 24, 2021*; 12:00 p.m., FloSports		vs. Abilene Christian; Nassau Championship 7th Place Game	Canceled due to COVID-19 issues at Abilene Christian		Baha Mar Convention Center; Nassau, Bahamas
November 30, 2021*; 7:00 p.m., Stadium		Davidson	L 58–75	3–3	Dale F. Halton Arena (4,258); Charlotte, NC
December 4, 2021*; 2:00 p.m., ESPN+		George Washington	W 86–79	4–3	Dale F. Halton Arena (2,626); Charlotte, NC
December 7, 2021*; 9:00 p.m., SECN		at No. 12 Arkansas	L 66–86	4–4	Bud Walton Arena (19,200); Fayetteville, AR
December 11, 2021*; 1:00 p.m., ESPN+		at Valparaiso	W 68–67	5–4	Athletics–Recreation Center (2,264); Valparaiso, IN
December 17, 2021*; 9:00 p.m., ACCN		vs. Wake Forest; Basketball Hall of Fame Shootout	L 79–82	5–5	Spectrum Center; Charlotte, NC
December 20, 2021*; 7:00 p.m., CUSA.tv		Maryland Eastern Shore	W 70–54	6–5	Dale F. Halton Arena (2,092); Charlotte, NC
December 22, 2021*; 5:00 p.m., CUSA.tv		Western Carolina	W 98–82	7–5	Dale F. Halton Arena (2,805); Charlotte, NC
Conference USA regular season
January 13, 2022; 7:00 p.m., ESPN+		UTEP	W 66–53	8–5 (1–0)	Dale F. Halton Arena; Charlotte, NC
January 15, 2022; 1:00 p.m., ESPN+		UTSA	W 62–53	9–5 (2–0)	Dale F. Halton Arena (26); Charlotte, NC
January 17, 2022; 4:00 p.m., CUSA.tv		at Florida Atlantic; Rescheduled from December 30	L 67–96	9–6 (2–1)	FAU Arena (1,029); Boca Raton, FL
January 20, 2022; 7:00 p.m., ESPNU		at North Texas	L 51–65	9–7 (2–2)	The Super Pit (3,759); Denton, TX
January 22, 2022; 3:00 p.m., ESPN+		at Rice	W 67–64	10–7 (3–2)	Tudor Fieldhouse (1,641); Houston, TX
January 26, 2022; 7:00 p.m., ESPN+		Old Dominion; Rescheduled from January 8	W 71–67	11–7 (4–2)	Dale F. Halton Arena (2,561); Charlotte, NC
January 29, 2022; 7:00 p.m., ESPN+		at Old Dominion	L 52–68	11–8 (4–3)	Chartway Arena (4,632); Norfolk, VA
February 3, 2022; 7:00 p.m., ESPN+		Western Kentucky	L 59–78	11–9 (4–4)	Dale F. Halton Arena (3,024); Charlotte, NC
February 5, 2022; 4:00 p.m., Stadium		Marshall	W 88–64	12–9 (5–4)	Dale F. Halton Arena (3,451); Charlotte, NC
February 7, 2022; 5:00 p.m., CUSA.tv		at FIU; Rescheduled from January 1	W 81–68	13–9 (6–4)	Ocean Bank Convocation Center; Miami, FL
February 10, 2022; 7:00 p.m., Stadium		Louisiana Tech	L 77–82	13–10 (6–5)	Dale F. Halton Arena (2,770); Charlotte, NC
February 13, 2022; 3:00 p.m., ESPN+		at Middle Tennessee	L 63–78	13–11 (6–6)	Murphy Center (3,685); Murfreesboro, TN
February 17, 2022; 8:00 p.m., CBSSN		at Western Kentucky	L 67–77	13–12 (6–7)	E. A. Diddle Arena (3,421); Bowling Green, KY
February 19, 2022; 7:00 p.m., ESPN+		at Marshall	L 84–99	14–12 (7–7)	Cam Henderson Center (5,471); Huntington, WV
February 24, 2022; 7:00 p.m., ESPN+		FIU	W 64–55	15–12 (8–7)	Dale F. Halton Arena (2,483); Charlotte, NC
February 26, 2022; 4:00 p.m., ESPN+		Florida Atlantic	L 69–74	15–13 (8–8)	Dale F. Halton Arena (3,136); Charlotte, NC
March 2, 2022; 7:00 p.m., ESPN+		Middle Tennessee	W 60–56	16–13 (9–8)	Dale F. Halton Arena (3,070); Charlotte, NC
March 5, 2022; 3:00 p.m., ESPN+		at Southern Miss	W 70–67	17–13 (10–8)	Reed Green Coliseum (2,840); Hattiesburg, MS
Conference USA tournament
March 9, 2022; 5:30 p.m., ESPN+	(E4)	vs. (W5) Rice; Second round	L 61–73	17–14	Ford Center at The Star; Frisco, TX
*Non-conference game. ^{#}Rankings from AP Poll. (#) Tournament seedings in parentheses. All times are in Eastern.

== See also ==
- 2021–22 Charlotte 49ers women's basketball team
