= 2022 Conference USA men's basketball tournament =

American college basketball postseason tournament

- Classification: Division I
- Season: 2021–22
- Teams: 14
- Site: Ford Center at The Star; Frisco, Texas
- Champions: UAB (2nd title)
- Winning coach: Andy Kennedy
- Television: Stadium, ESPN+, CBSSN

2021–22 Conference USA men's basketball standings
	Conf.				Overall
Team	W		L	PCT	W		L	PCT
East
Middle Tennessee	13	–	5	.722	26	–	11	.703
Western Kentucky	11	–	7	.611	19	–	13	.594
Florida Atlantic	11	–	7	.611	19	–	15	.559
Charlotte	10	–	8	.556	17	–	14	.548
Old Dominion	8	–	10	.444	13	–	19	.406
FIU	5	–	13	.278	15	–	17	.469
Marshall	4	–	14	.222	12	–	21	.364
West
North Texas	16	–	2	.889	25	–	7	.781
UAB †	14	–	4	.778	27	–	8	.771
Louisiana Tech	12	–	6	.667	24	–	10	.706
UTEP	11	–	7	.611	20	–	14	.588
Rice	7	–	11	.389	16	–	17	.485
UTSA	3	–	15	.167	10	–	22	.313
Southern Miss	1	–	17	.056	7	–	26	.212
† 2022 C-USA Tournament winner

The 2022 Conference USA men's basketball tournament was the concluding event of the 2021–22 men's basketball season for Conference USA (C-USA). It was held March 8–12, 2022, in Frisco, Texas, at the Ford Center at The Star. The winner, the UAB Blazers, received the conference's automatic bid to the 2022 NCAA tournament.

== Seeds ==
Seed	School	Record	Tiebreaker
#1 East	Middle Tennessee	13–5	
#1 West	North Texas	16–2	
#2 East	Western Kentucky	11–7	2–0 vs. Old Dominion
#2 West	UAB	14–4	
#3 East	Florida Atlantic	11–7	1–1 vs. Old Dominion
#3 West	Louisiana Tech	12–6	
#4 East	Charlotte	10–8	
#4 West	UTEP	11–7	
#5 East	Old Dominion	8–10	
#5 West	Rice	7–11	
#6 East	FIU	5–13	
#6 West	UTSA	3–15	
#7 East	Marshall	4–14	
#7 West	Southern Miss	1–17	

== Schedule ==
Game	Time	Matchup	Score	Television
First Round – Tuesday, March 8
1	6:30 pm	E6 FIU vs. E7 Marshall	62–74	ESPN+
2	7:00 pm	W6 UTSA vs. W7 Southern Miss	64–67	ESPN+
Second Round – Wednesday, March 9
3	5:30 pm	E4 Charlotte vs. W5 Rice	61–73	ESPN+
4	6:00 pm	W3 Louisiana Tech vs. E7 Marshall	77–67	ESPN+
5	8:00 pm	W4 UTEP vs. E5 Old Dominion	74–64	ESPN+
6	8:30 pm	E3 FAU vs. W7 Southern Miss	86–59	ESPN+
Quarterfinals – Thursday, March 10
7	5:30 pm	W1 North Texas vs. W5 Rice	68–50	Stadium
8	6:00 pm	E2 Western Kentucky vs. W3 Louisiana Tech	57–59	Stadium
9	8:00 pm	E1 Middle Tennessee vs. W4 UTEP	66–59^{OT}	Stadium
10	8:30 pm	W2 UAB vs. E3 FAU	80–66	Stadium
Semifinals – Friday, March 11
11	11:30 am	W1 North Texas vs. W3 Louisiana Tech	36-42	CBSSN
12	2:00 pm	E1 Middle Tennessee vs. W2 UAB	98-102^{3OT}	CBSSN
Championship – Saturday, March 12
13	7:30 pm	W3 Louisiana Tech vs. W2 UAB	82-73	CBSSN
*Game times in CT. #-Rankings denote tournament seed

== Bracket ==
First round Tuesday, March 8 ESPN+
6E	Florida International	62
7E	Marshall	74
6W	UTSA	64
7W	Southern Miss	67

Second round Wednesday, March 9 ESPN+
4E	Charlotte	61
5W	Rice	73
3W	Louisiana Tech	77
7E	Marshall	67
4W	UTEP	74
5E	Old Dominion	64
3E	Florida Atlantic	86
7W	Southern Miss	59

Quarterfinals; Thursday, March 10; Stadium
1W	North Texas	68
5W	Rice	50
2E	Western Kentucky	57
3W	Louisiana Tech	59
1E	Middle Tennessee	66*
4W	UTEP	59
2W	UAB	80
3E	Florida Atlantic	66

Semifinals; Friday, March 11; CBSSN
1W	North Texas	36
3W	Louisiana Tech	42
1E	Middle Tennessee	98
2W	UAB	102***

Championship; Saturday, March 12; CBSSN
3W	Louisiana Tech	73
2W	UAB	82

* denotes overtime period.

== See also ==
- 2022 Conference USA women's basketball tournament
