= 2021–22 Marshall Thundering Herd men's basketball team =

American college basketball season

2021–22 Marshall Thundering Herd men's basketball
- Conference: Conference USA
- East Division
- Record: 12–21 (4–14 C-USA)
- Head coach: Dan D'Antoni (8th season)
- Assistant coaches: Mark Cline; Scott Rigot; Cornelius Jackson
- Home arena: Cam Henderson Center

2021–22 Conference USA men's basketball standings
| | Conf. | | | | Overall |
| Team | W | | L | PCT | W | | L | PCT |
|---|---|---|---|---|---|---|---|---|
East
| Middle Tennessee | 13 | – | 5 | .722 | 26 | – | 11 | .703 |
| Western Kentucky | 11 | – | 7 | .611 | 19 | – | 13 | .594 |
| Florida Atlantic | 11 | – | 7 | .611 | 19 | – | 15 | .559 |
| Charlotte | 10 | – | 8 | .556 | 17 | – | 14 | .548 |
| Old Dominion | 8 | – | 10 | .444 | 13 | – | 19 | .406 |
| FIU | 5 | – | 13 | .278 | 15 | – | 17 | .469 |
| Marshall | 4 | – | 14 | .222 | 12 | – | 21 | .364 |
West
| North Texas | 16 | – | 2 | .889 | 25 | – | 7 | .781 |
| UAB † | 14 | – | 4 | .778 | 27 | – | 8 | .771 |
| Louisiana Tech | 12 | – | 6 | .667 | 24 | – | 10 | .706 |
| UTEP | 11 | – | 7 | .611 | 20 | – | 14 | .588 |
| Rice | 7 | – | 11 | .389 | 16 | – | 17 | .485 |
| UTSA | 3 | – | 15 | .167 | 10 | – | 22 | .313 |
| Southern Miss | 1 | – | 17 | .056 | 7 | – | 26 | .212 |
† 2022 C-USA Tournament winner

The 2021–22 Marshall Thundering Herd men's basketball team represented Marshall University during the 2021–22 NCAA Division I men's basketball season. The Thundering Herd, led by eighth-year head coach Dan D'Antoni, played their home games at the Cam Henderson Center as members of Conference USA. They finished the season 12–21, 4–14 in C-USA play to finish in seventh place in the East Division. They defeated FIU before losing to Louisiana Tech in the second round of the C-USA tournament.

On October 30, 2021, Marshall announced they would become a member of the Sun Belt Conference. On March 29, it was announced they would officially join on July 1, 2022, making this the final season competing in C-USA.

== Previous season ==
The Thundering Herd finished the 2020–21 season 15–7, 9–5 in C-USA play to finish in third place in the East Division. They were defeated in the second round of the C-USA tournament by Rice.

== Offseason ==
=== Departures ===
| Name | Number | Pos. | Height | Weight | Year | Hometown | Notes |
|---|---|---|---|---|---|---|---|
| Iran Bennett | 2 | F | 6'9" | 335 | RS Junior | Durham, North Carolina | Transferred to Eastern Kentucky |
| Ty Sturm | 4 | G | 6'2" | 170 | Freshman | Hurricane, West Virginia | Walk-on; transferred to Alaska |
| Luke Thomas | 11 | G | 6'0" | 177 | Junior | Proctorville, Ohio | Graduated; did not return |
| Jarrod West | 13 | G | 5'11" | 181 | Senior | Clarksburg, West Virginia | Graduate transferred to Louisville |
| Jannson Williams | 3 | F | 6'9" | 219 | RS Senior | Newnan, Georgia | Graduate transferred to Eastern Kentucky |

=== 2021 recruiting class ===
College recruiting information
| Name | Hometown | School | Height | Weight | Commit date |
|---|---|---|---|---|---|
| Kyle Braun; SG | Calabasas, California | El Camino High School | 6 ft 2 in (1.88 m) | 170 lb (77 kg) | Feb 4, 2021 |
| Kyle Braun; SG | Recruit ratings: (NR) | | | | |
| Wyatt Fricks; PF | Winder, Georgia | Winder-Barrow High School | 6 ft 9 in (2.06 m) | 190 lb (86 kg) | Mar 14, 2021 |
| Wyatt Fricks; PF | Recruit ratings: (NR) | | | | |
| Chase McKey; PF | Atlanta, Georgia | The Skill Factory Prep | 6 ft 9 in (2.06 m) | 210 lb (95 kg) | Apr 14, 2021 |
| Chase McKey; PF | Recruit ratings: Rivals: (NR) | | | | |
| Aymeric Touissant; PF | Hoosick, New York | Hoosac School | 6 ft 9 in (2.06 m) | 200 lb (91 kg) | Jul 15, 2021 |
| Aymeric Touissant; PF | Recruit ratings: (NR) | | | | |
Overall recruit ranking: Rivals: NR 247Sports: NR ESPN: NR
Note: In many cases, Scout, Rivals, 247Sports, On3, and ESPN may conflict in their listings of height and weight.; In these cases, the average was taken. ESPN grades are on a 100-point scale.; Sources: "Marshall Basketball Commitment List". Rivals.; "ESPN". ESPN.; "2021 Team Ranking". Rivals.

== Roster ==
Note: Players' year is based on remaining eligibility. Because the NCAA did not count the 2020–21 season towards eligibility, last year's Freshmen are still considered Freshmen this season.

2021–22 Marshall Thundering Herd men's basketball team
Players
Coaches

| Pos. | # | Name | Height | Weight | Year | Previous school | Hometown |
|---|---|---|---|---|---|---|---|
| G | 0 | Andrew Taylor | 6 ft 3 in (1.91 m) | 185 lb (84 kg) | RS So | Corbin | Corbin, Kentucky |
| F | 1 | Chase McKey | 6 ft 9 in (2.06 m) | 210 lb (95 kg) | Fr | The Skill Factory | Atlanta, Georgia |
| F | 2 | Darius George | 6 ft 7 in (2.01 m) | 205 lb (93 kg) | Sr | Staunton (Robert E. Lee) | Staunton, Virginia |
| G | 3 | Kyle Braun | 6 ft 3 in (1.91 m) | 180 lb (82 kg) | Fr | Scotland Prep | Los Angeles, California |
| G/F | 5 | Jeremy Dillon | 6 ft 5 in (1.96 m) | 190 lb (86 kg) | RS So | Mingo Central | Mingo, West Virginia |
| F | 11 | Wyatt Fricks | 6 ft 9 in (2.06 m) | 195 lb (88 kg) | Fr | Winder-Barrow | Winder, Georgia |
| G/F | 12 | Aymeric Toussaint | 6 ft 9 in (2.06 m) | 225 lb (102 kg) | Fr | Hoosac | Saint-Denis, Réunion |
| G | 13 | Creighton Thienneman (W) | 6 ft 5 in (1.96 m) | 200 lb (91 kg) | Fr | South Oldham | Louisville, Kentucky |
| G/F | 15 | Marko Sarenac | 6 ft 7 in (2.01 m) | 210 lb (95 kg) | So | Hoosac | Ljubovija, Serbia |
| C | 21 | Goran Miladinovic | 7 ft 0 in (2.13 m) | 250 lb (113 kg) | So | Hoosac | Tivat, Montenegro |
| G | 23 | David Early | 6 ft 4 in (1.93 m) | 235 lb (107 kg) | Fr | Logan | Logan, West Virginia |
| G | 24 | Taevion Kinsey | 6 ft 5 in (1.96 m) | 190 lb (86 kg) | Jr | Eastmoor | Columbus, Ohio |
| F | 25 | Obinna Anochili-Killen | 6 ft 8 in (2.03 m) | 220 lb (100 kg) | Fr | Chapmanville | Lagos, Nigeria |
| F | 31 | Mikel Beyers | 6 ft 10 in (2.08 m) | 225 lb (102 kg) | Sr | Mesa CC | Houston, Texas |
| G | 35 | Devin Collins | 6 ft 8 in (2.03 m) | 200 lb (91 kg) | RS Fr | Chapmanville | Chapmanville, West Virginia |

Head coach

- Dan D'Antoni (Marshall)

Assistant coach(es)

- Mark Cline (Wake Forest)
- Scott Rigot (Buffalo)
- Cornelius Jackson (Marshall)

Legend

- (C) Team captain
- (S) Suspended
- (I) Ineligible
- (W) Walk-on
- Injured
- Current redshirt

Roster
Last update: 10/07/2021

== Schedule and results ==
| Date time, TV | Rank^{#} | Opponent^{#} | Result | Record | High points | High rebounds | High assists | Site (attendance) city, state |
Exhibition
| October 31, 2021*; 2:00 pm, ESPN+ | | Davis & Elkins | W 113–72 | – | 17 – Early | 9 – Anochili-Killen | 5 – Taylor | Cam Henderson Center (2,567); Huntington, WV |
| November 7, 2021*; 2:00 pm, ESPN+ | | Pikeville | W 86–59 | – | 18 – Taylor | 8 – Kinsey | 11 – Taylor | Cam Henderson Center (3,729); Huntington, WV |
Non-conference regular season
| November 12, 2021*; 7:00 pm, ESPN+ | | Wright State | W 96–88 | 1–0 | 22 – Kinsey | 8 – Anochili-Killen | 11 – Taylor | Cam Henderson Center (4,781); Huntington, WV |
| November 15, 2021*; 7:00 pm, ESPN+ | | Milligan | W 80–58 | 2–0 | 21 – Kinsey | 7 – Tied | 9 – Kinsey | Cam Henderson Center (3,983); Huntington, WV |
| November 18, 2021*; 7:00 pm, ESPN+ | | Campbell | L 65–67 | 2–1 | 24 – George | 8 – Tied | 5 – Taylor | Cam Henderson Center (4,131); Huntington, WV |
| November 21, 2021*; 4:00 pm, ESPN+ | | Jackson State | W 80–66 | 3–1 | 24 – Kinsey | 10 – Taylor | 8 – Taylor | Cam Henderson Center (3,839); Huntington, WV |
| November 23, 2021*; 7:00 pm, ESPN+ | | Louisiana | W 93–79 | 4–1 | 21 – Kinsey | 11 – Anochili-Killen | 7 – Taylor | Cam Henderson Center (4,111); Huntington, WV |
| November 27, 2021*; 7:00 pm, BTN | | at Indiana | L 79–90 | 4–2 | 21 – Kinsey | 8 – Anochili-Killen | 4 – Taylor | Assembly Hall (12,330); Bloomington, IN |
| December 1, 2021*; 7:00 pm, ESPN+ | | at Akron | L 86–88 | 4–3 | 30 – Kinsey | 5 – Tied | 4 – Tied | James A. Rhodes Arena (1,752); Akron, OH |
| December 4, 2021*; 7:00 pm, ESPN+ | | Duquesne | W 72–71 | 5–3 | 21 – Kinsey | 8 – George | 6 – Kinsey | Cam Henderson Center (4,367); Huntington, WV |
| December 8, 2021*; 7:00 pm, ESPN+ | | Bluefield | W 100–57 | 6–3 | 21 – Kinsey | 8 – Kinsey | 7 – Kinsey | Cam Henderson Center (3,738); Huntington, WV |
| December 11, 2021*; 7:00 pm, ESPN+ | | at Eastern Kentucky | W 80–69 | 7–3 | 21 – Kinsey | 12 – George | 5 – Kinsey | McBrayer Arena (4,071); Richmond, KY |
| December 15, 2021*; 7:00 pm, ESPN+ | | at Ohio | L 65–75 | 7–4 | 18 – Anochili-Killen | 9 – Anochili-Killen | 5 – Taylor | Convocation Center (6,227); Athens, OH |
| December 18, 2021*; 4:00 pm, Stadium | | Northern Iowa | L 60–75 | 7–5 | 22 – Anochili-Killen | 6 – Taylor | 5 – Taylor | Cam Henderson Center (3,849); Huntington, WV |
| December 21, 2021*; 7:00 pm, ESPN+ | | at Toledo | L 63–95 | 7–6 | 19 – Kinsey | 8 – Kinsey | 6 – Kinsey | Savage Arena (3,769); Toledo, OH |
Conference USA regular season
| December 30, 2021; 9:00 pm, ESPNU | | at Louisiana Tech | L 56–79 | 7–7 (0–1) | 15 – Anochili-Killen | 8 – Tied | 4 – Anochili-Killen | Thomas Assembly Center (2,778); Ruston, LA |
| January 8, 2022; 7:00 pm, ESPN+ | | Florida Atlantic | L 77–90 | 7–8 (0–2) | 23 – Anochili-Killen | 8 – Anochili-Killen | 8 – Early | Cam Henderson Center (4,115); Huntington, WV |
| January 13, 2022; 7:00 pm, ESPN+ | | North Texas | L 65–69 | 7–9 (0–3) | 29 – Kinsey | 5 – Kinsey | 5 – Kinsey | Cam Henderson Center (3,818); Huntington, WV |
| January 15, 2022; 7:00 pm, ESPN+ | | Rice | L 77–87 | 7–10 (0–4) | 31 – Kinsey | 9 – Taylor | 10 – Kinsey | Cam Henderson Center (4,239); Huntington, WV |
| January 20, 2022; 7:00 pm, ESPN+ | | at FIU | L 66–70 | 7–11 (0–5) | 25 – Kinsey | 6 – Kinsey | 3 – Kinsey | Ocean Bank Convocation Center (0); Miami, FL |
| January 22, 2022; 4:00 pm, ESPN+ | | at Florida Atlantic | L 60–71 | 7–12 (0–6) | 21 – Kinsey | 7 – Kinsey | 2 – Tied | FAU Arena (1,721); Boca Raton, FL |
| January 27, 2022; 7:00 pm, ESPN+ | | Middle Tennessee | L 79–81 | 7–13 (0–7) | 22 – Taylor | 9 – Anochili-Killen | 5 – Kinsey | Cam Henderson Center (3,864); Huntington, WV |
| January 29, 2022; 7:00 pm, ESPN+ | | UAB | W 84–81 | 8–13 (1–7) | 23 – Anochili-Killen | 11 – Anochili-Killen | 7 – Taylor | Cam Henderson Center (4,233); Huntington, WV |
| February 3, 2022; 8:00 pm, CBSSN | | at Old Dominion | L 64–79 | 8–14 (1–8) | 15 – Anochili-Killen | 8 – Anochili-Killen | 7 – Taylor | Chartway Arena (4,370); Norfolk, VA |
| February 5, 2021; 4:00 pm, Stadium | | at Charlotte | L 64–88 | 8–15 (1–9) | 28 – Taylor | 8 – Anochili-Kilen | 5 – Beyers | Dale F. Halton Arena (3,451); Charlotte, NC |
| February 10, 2022; 7:00 pm, ESPN+ | | FIU | L 71–72 | 8–16 (1–10) | 22 – Taylor | 9 – Anochili-Killen | 5 – Tied | Cam Henderson Center (3,779); Huntington, WV |
| February 13, 2022; 3:00 pm, CUSA.tv | | at UTEP | W 88–79 | 9–16 (2–10) | 17 – Miladinovic | 11 – Miladinovic | 11 – Kinsey | Don Haskins Center (4,129); El Paso, TX |
| February 17, 2022; 7:00 pm, ESPN+ | | Old Dominion | W 67–63 | 10–16 (3–10) | 16 – Sarenac | 7 – Beyers | 5 – Taylor | Cam Henderson Center (3,867); Huntington, WV |
| February 19, 2022; 7:00 pm, ESPN+ | | Charlotte | L 84–99 | 10–17 (3–11) | 21 – Taylor | 4 – Taylor | 6 – Taylor | Cam Henderson Center (5,471); Huntington, WV |
| February 21, 2022; 8:00 pm, ESPN+ | | at Southern Miss; Rescheduled from January 1 | W 74–60 | 11–17 (4–11) | 17 – Taylor | 5 – 6 Tied | 4 – Tied | Reed Green Coliseum (2,690); Hattiesburg, MS |
| February 24, 2021; 7:00 pm, ESPN+ | | at Middle Tennessee | L 65–74 | 11–18 (4–12) | 24 – Taylor | 9 – Beyers | 3 – Anochili-Killen | Murphy Center (4,505); Murfreesboro, TN |
| March 2, 2022; 7:00 pm, ESPNU | | Western Kentucky | L 72–86 | 11–19 (4–13) | 24 – Kinsey | 9 – Anochili-Killen | 5 – Kinsey | Cam Henderson Center (4,963); Huntington, WV |
| March 5, 2022; 3:00 pm, ESPN+ | | at Western Kentucky | L 69–78 | 11–20 (4–14) | 18 – Sarenac | 11 – Miladinovic | 7 – Kinsey | E. A. Diddle Arena (6,098); Bowling Green, KY |
Conference USA tournament
| March 8, 2022; 8:00 pm, ESPN+ | (E7) | vs. (E6) FIU; First round | W 74–62 | 12–20 | 23 – Kinsey | 12 – Anochili-Killen | 4 – Taylor | Ford Center at The Star; Frisco, TX |
| March 9, 2022; 6:00 pm, ESPN+ | (E7) | vs. (W3) Louisiana Tech; Second round | L 67–77 | 12–21 | 24 – Kinsey | 12 – Beyers | 4 – Taylor | Ford Center at The Star; Frisco, TX |
*Non-conference game. ^{#}Rankings from AP Poll. (#) Tournament seedings in parentheses. All times are in Eastern Time.
