= 2021–22 UAB Blazers men's basketball team =

American college basketball season

2021–22 UAB Blazers men's basketball

C-USA tournament champions

NCAA tournament, First Round
- Conference: Conference USA
- West Division
- Record: 27–8 (14–4 C-USA)
- Head coach: Andy Kennedy (2nd season)
- Assistant coaches: Philip Pearson; Ryan Cross; Terry Parker
- Home arena: Bartow Arena

2021–22 Conference USA men's basketball standings
	Conf.				Overall
Team	W		L	PCT	W		L	PCT
East
Middle Tennessee	13	–	5	.722	26	–	11	.703
Western Kentucky	11	–	7	.611	19	–	13	.594
Florida Atlantic	11	–	7	.611	19	–	15	.559
Charlotte	10	–	8	.556	17	–	14	.548
Old Dominion	8	–	10	.444	13	–	19	.406
FIU	5	–	13	.278	15	–	17	.469
Marshall	4	–	14	.222	12	–	21	.364
West
North Texas	16	–	2	.889	25	–	7	.781
UAB †	14	–	4	.778	27	–	8	.771
Louisiana Tech	12	–	6	.667	24	–	10	.706
UTEP	11	–	7	.611	20	–	14	.588
Rice	7	–	11	.389	16	–	17	.485
UTSA	3	–	15	.167	10	–	22	.313
Southern Miss	1	–	17	.056	7	–	26	.212
† 2022 C-USA Tournament winner

The 2021–22 UAB Blazers men's basketball team represented the University of Alabama at Birmingham during the 2021–22 NCAA Division I men's basketball season. The team was led by second-year head coach Andy Kennedy, and played their home games at the Bartow Arena in Birmingham, Alabama as a member of Conference USA. They finished the season 27–8, 14–4 in C-USA play to finish second in the West Division. As the No. 2 seed out of the West Division, they defeated Florida Atlantic, Middle Tennessee, and Louisiana Tech to win the C-USA tournament. They received the conference's automatic bid to the NCAA tournament as the No. 12 seed in the South Region, where they lost in the first round to Houston.

== Previous season ==
The Blazers finished the 2020–21 season 22–7, 13–5 in C-USA play to finish in second place in West Division. They defeated Rice in the quarterfinals of the C-USA tournament before losing to Western Kentucky in the semifinals. Despite winning 22 games, they did not participate in a postseason tournament.

== Offseason ==
=== Departures ===
Name	Number	Pos.	Height	Weight	Year	Hometown	Reason for departure
Tyreek Scott-Grayson	0	G	6'5"	177	Senior	Brick, NJ	Graduate transferred to Northeastern
Koby Jeffies	4	G	6'3"	190	RS freshman	Olive Branch, MS	Transferred to UT Martin
Jalen Benjamin	5	G	5'10"	140	RS sophomore	Raleigh, NC	Transferred to Mount St. Mary's
Simeon Kirkland	10	F	6'10"	225	Junior	Ocala, FL	Transferred to New Orleans
Kassim Nicholson	11	G	6'7"	200	Senior	Jackson, MS	Transferred to Tennessee State
Terrell Ard Jr.	15	F	6'7"	210	Freshman	Acworth, GA	Transferred to Presbyterian
Tobias Rotegård	33	G	6'7"	210	Freshman	Kongsberg, Norway	Transferred to Long Beach State

=== Incoming transfers ===
Name	Number	Pos.	Height	Weight	Year	Hometown	Previous school
Tyreke Locure	0	G	6'0"	165	Junior	New Orleans, LA	South Alabama
Justin Brown	4	G	6'6"	208	Graduate student	Atlanta, GA	South Florida
KJ Buffen	5	F	6'7"	230	Senior	Gainesville, GA	Ole Miss
Jordan Walker	10	G	5'11"	170	RS senior	Port Washington, NY	Tulane
Jamal Johnson	11	G	6'4"	195	RS senior	Birmingham, AL	Auburn
AD Diedhiou	22	C	6'10"	240	Junior	Dakar, Senegal	Odessa College
Josh LeBlanc Sr.	23	F	6'7"	230	Senior	Baton Rouge, LA	LSU
Elijah Tate	24	G	6'3"	185	Sophomore	Baton Rouge, LA	Odessa College

=== Recruiting class of 2021 ===
There was no incoming recruiting class of 2021.

== Roster ==
2021–22 UAB Blazers men's basketball team
Players
Coaches

Pos.	#	Name	Height	Weight	Year	Previous school	Hometown
G	0	Tyreke Locure	6 ft 0 in (1.83 m)	165 lb (75 kg)	Jr	South Alabama	New Orleans, Louisiana
G	2	Michael Ertel	6 ft 2 in (1.88 m)	190 lb (86 kg)	GS	Louisiana–Monroe	Indianapolis, Indiana
G	3	Tavin Lovan	6 ft 4 in (1.93 m)	210 lb (95 kg)	Sr	Franklin-Simpson High School	Franklin, Kentucky
G	4	Justin Brown	6 ft 6 in (1.98 m)	208 lb (94 kg)	GS	South Florida	Atlanta, Georgia
F	5	KJ Buffen	6 ft 7 in (2.01 m)	230 lb (104 kg)	Sr	Ole Miss	Gainesville, Georgia
G	10	Jordan Walker	5 ft 11 in (1.8 m)	170 lb (77 kg)	RS Sr	Tulane	Port Washington, New York
G	11	Jamal Johnson	6 ft 4 in (1.93 m)	195 lb (88 kg)	RS Sr	Auburn	Birmingham, Alabama
G	12	Tony Toney	6 ft 2 in (1.88 m)	195 lb (88 kg)	So	Mae Jeminson High School	Huntsville, Alabama
G	13	Quan Jackson	6 ft 4 in (1.93 m)	190 lb (86 kg)	GS	Georgia Southern	Tallahassee, Florida
G	21	Jon Coleman	5 ft 10 in (1.78 m)	165 lb (75 kg)	Jr	Hall High School	Little Rock, Arkansas
F	22	AD Diedhiou	6 ft 10 in (2.08 m)	240 lb (109 kg)	Jr	Odessa College	Dakar, Senegal
F	23	Josh LeBlanc Sr.	6 ft 7 in (2.01 m)	230 lb (104 kg)	Sr	LSU	Baton Rouge, Louisiana
G	24	Elijah Tate	6 ft 3 in (1.91 m)	185 lb (84 kg)	So	Odessa College	Baton Rouge, Louisiana
F	25	Rongie Gordon	6 ft 8 in (2.03 m)	225 lb (102 kg)	So	Jefferson Davis High School	Montgomery, Alabama
G	30	Ryan Donohoo (W)	6 ft 0 in (1.83 m)	180 lb (82 kg)	Fr	Briarwood Christian School	Birmingham, Alabama
C	55	Trey Jemison	7 ft 0 in (2.13 m)	260 lb (118 kg)	Sr	Clemson	Birmingham, Alabama

Head coach

- Andy Kennedy (UAB)

Assistant coach(es)

- Philip Pearson (Alabama)
- Ryan Cross (Buffalo)
- Terry Parker (Louisiana Tech)

Legend

- (C) Team captain
- (S) Suspended
- (I) Ineligible
- (W) Walk-on
- Injured
- Current redshirt

Roster

== Schedule and results ==
Date time, TV	Rank^{#}	Opponent^{#}	Result	Record	High points	High rebounds	High assists	Site (attendance) city, state
Exhibition
November 1, 2021*; 6:30 p.m.		Auburn Montgomery	W 101–70		19 – Brown	9 – LeBlanc	5 – Locure	Bartow Arena (1,655); Birmingham, AL
Non-conference regular season
November 9, 2021*; 6:30 p.m., CUSA.tv		UNC Asheville	W 102–77	1–0	19 – 2 Tied	8 – Jemison	5 – Walker	Bartow Arena (2,923); Birmingham, AL
November 12, 2021*; 6:00 p.m., CUSA.tv		Morehead State	W 85–71	2–0	23 – Walker	4 – Buffen	7 – Walker	Bartow Arena (2,829); Birmingham, AL
November 14, 2021*; 2:00 p.m., CUSA.tv		Rhodes	W 98–61	3–0	20 – Ertel	12 – Jemison	4 – 2 Tied	Bartow Arena (2,575); Birmingham, AL
November 18, 2021*; 6:00 p.m., SECN+		at South Carolina	L 63–66	3–1	15 – Walker	8 – Jemison	3 – Walker	Colonial Life Arena (8,856); Columbia, SC
November 21, 2021*; 2:00 p.m., ESPN+		Alabama A&M	W 86–41	4–1	15 – Johnson	11 – Jemison	8 – Walker	Bartow Arena (2,918); Birmingham, AL
November 25, 2021*; 6:00 p.m., FS1		vs. New Mexico; Las Vegas Invitational semifinals	W 86–73	5–1	26 – Walker	12 – Jemison	6 – Walker	Orleans Arena; Paradise, NV
November 26, 2021*; 10:30 p.m., FS1		vs. San Francisco; Las Vegas Invitational finals	L 61–63	5–2	14 – Lovan	7 – Jemison	2 – Lovan	Orleans Arena; Paradise, NV
December 1, 2021*; 6:30 p.m., ESPN+		East Tennessee State	W 70–56	6–2	20 – Buffen	16 – Buffen	6 – Walker	Bartow Arena (2,695); Birmingham, AL
December 4, 2021*; 5:30 p.m., BSMW/ESPN+		at Saint Louis	W 77–72	7–2	18 – Walker	11 – Jemison	7 – Walker	Chaifetz Arena (5,743); St. Louis, MO
December 12, 2021*; 2:00 p.m., CUSA.tv		Millsaps	W 103–29	8–2	16 – Buffen	11 – Buffen	4 – Walker	Bartow Arena (2,578); Birmingham, AL
December 14, 2021*; 6:30 p.m., ESPN+		Grambling State	W 79–61	9–2	22 – Walker	7 – LeBlanc	3 – Jackson	Bartow Arena (2,543); Birmingham, AL
December 18, 2021*; 4:00 p.m., CBSSN		West Virginia	L 59–65	9–3	13 – Walker	12 – Jemison	4 – Walker	Legacy Arena (4,554); Birmingham, AL
December 22, 2021*; 6:30 p.m., CUSA.tv		Mississippi Valley State	W 100–58	10–3	14 – Walker	10 – Buffen	4 – Walker	Bartow Arena (2,695); Birmingham, AL
Conference USA regular season
December 30, 2022; 6:30 p.m., CUSA.tv		UTEP	W 75–62	11–3 (1–0)	25 – Ertel	6 – Buffen	4 – Walker	Bartow Arena (2,795); Birmingham, AL
January 1, 2022; 2:00 p.m., CUSA.tv		UTSA	W 87–59	12–3 (2–0)	20 – Buffen	9 – Buffen	6 – Lovan	Bartow Arena (2,730); Birmingham, AL
January 6, 2022; 7:00 p.m., CBSSN		at North Texas	W 69–63	13–3 (3–0)	17 – Walker	8 – LeBlanc	4 – Lovan	UNT Coliseum (3,207); Denton, TX
January 8, 2022; 3:00 p.m.		at Rice	L 80–85	13–4 (3–1)	20 – Walker	6 – Jemison	7 – Walker	Tudor Fieldhouse (500); Houston, TX
January 13, 2022; 6:30 p.m., ESPN+		FIU	W 84–56	14–4 (4–1)	20 – Walker	11 – Buffen	3 – Jemison	Bartow Arena (2,995); Birmingham, AL
January 15, 2022; 3:00 p.m., ESPN+		Florida Atlantic	W 76–65	15–4 (5–1)	29 – Jackson	10 – Jemison	5 – Walker	Bartow Arena (3,456); Birmingham, AL
January 22, 2022; 3:00 p.m., Stadium		at Louisiana Tech	W 83–76	16–4 (6–1)	36 – Walker	13 – Buffen	2 – Tied	Thomas Assembly Center (4,071); Ruston, LA
January 27, 2022; 8:00 p.m., CBSSN		at Western Kentucky	W 68–65	17–4 (7–1)	21 – Walker	12 – Jemison	5 – Walker	E. A. Diddle Arena (4,136); Bowling Green, KY
January 29, 2022; 6:00 p.m., ESPN+		at Marshall	L 81–84	17–5 (7–2)	23 – Walker	5 – Tied	8 – Walker	Cam Henderson Center (4,233); Huntington, WV
February 5, 2022; 3:00 p.m., ESPN+		Middle Tennessee	W 97–75	18–5 (8–2)	42 – Walker	10 – Jackson	5 – Jackson	Bartow Arena (4,273); Birmingham, AL
February 10, 2022; 6:00 p.m., CBSSN		Southern Miss	W 84–63	19–5 (9–2)	25 – Walker	10 – Jackson	8 – Walker	Bartow Arena (3,638); Birmingham, AL
February 13, 2022; 1:00 p.m., ESPNU		at Old Dominion	L 72–81	19–6 (9–3)	20 – Walker	10 – Buffen	7 – Walker	Chartway Arena (3,777); Norfolk, VA
February 17, 2022; 7:00 p.m., Stadium		Rice	W 92–68	20–6 (10–3)	21 – Jackson	11 – Buffen	12 – Walker	Bartow Arena (2,643); Birmingham, AL
February 19, 2022; 3:00 p.m., Stadium		North Texas	L 57–58	20–7 (10–4)	17 – Walker	10 – Jackson	3 – Jackson	Bartow Arena (4,271); Birmingham, AL
February 24, 2022; 7:00 p.m., ESPN+		at UTSA	W 68–56	21–7 (11–4)	16 – Buffen	12 – Jemison	3 – Walker	Convocation Center (805); San Antonio, TX
February 26, 2022; 8:00 p.m., ESPN+		at UTEP	W 69–66	22–7 (12–4)	22 – Walker	12 – Jemison	7 – Walker	Don Haskins Center (6,100); El Paso, TX
March 2, 2022; 7:00 p.m., ESPN3/ESPN+		at Southern Miss	W 81–68	23–7 (13–4)	21 – Walker	12 – Jemison	6 – Walker	Reed Green Coliseum (2,680); Hattiesburg, MS
March 5, 2022; 2:00 p.m., Stadium		Louisiana Tech	W 87–74	24–7 (14–4)	24 – Walker	9 – Jemison	7 – Walker	Bartow Arena (4,547); Birmingham, AL
Conference USA tournament
March 10, 2022; 8:30 pm, Stadium	(W2)	vs. (E3) Florida Atlantic; Quarterfinals	W 80–66	25–7	26 – Walker	14 – Jackson	3 – Tied	Ford Center at The Star; Frisco, TX
March 11, 2022; 2:00 pm, CBSSN	(W2)	vs. (E1) Middle Tennessee; Semifinals	W 102–98 ^{3OT}	26–7	40 – Walker	10 – Tied	3 – Walker	Ford Center at The Star; Frisco, TX
March 12, 2022; 7:30 pm, CBSSN	(W2)	vs. (W3) Louisiana Tech; Championship	W 82–73	27–7	27 – Walker	8 – Jemison	4 – Walker	Ford Center at The Star; Frisco, TX
NCAA tournament
March 18, 2022; 8:20 pm, TNT	(12 S)	vs. (5 S) No. 15 Houston; First Round	L 68–82	27–8	17 – Walker	11 – Buffen	5 – Walker	PPG Paints Arena (17,410); Pittsburgh, PA
*Non-conference game. ^{#}Rankings from AP Poll. (#) Tournament seedings in parentheses. All times are in Central.

== See also ==
- 2021–22 UAB Blazers women's basketball team
