= Jahmir Young =

American basketball player (born 2000)

No. 17 – Coachella Valley Lakers
- Position: Point guard
- League: NBA G League

Personal information
- Born: October 7, 2000 (age 26) Upper Marlboro, Maryland, U.S.
- Listed height: 6 ft 0 in (1.83 m)
- Listed weight: 185 lb (84 kg)

Career information
- High school: St. Mary's Ryken (Leonardtown, Maryland); DeMatha Catholic (Hyattsville, Maryland)
- College: Charlotte (2019–2022); Maryland (2022–2024)
- NBA draft: 2024: undrafted
- Playing career: 2024–present

Career history
- 2024–2025: Grand Rapids Gold
- 2025: Chicago Bulls
- 2025: →Windy City Bulls
- 2025–2026: Miami Heat
- 2025–2026: →Sioux Falls Skyforce
- 2026–present: Coachella Valley Lakers

Career highlights
- All-NBA G League Second Team (2026); NBA G League All-Rookie Team (2025); First-team All-Big Ten (2024); Second-team All-Big Ten (2023); 2× First-team All-Conference USA (2021, 2022); Third-team All-Conference USA (2020); Conference USA Freshman of the Year (2020)
- Stats at NBA.com
- Stats at Basketball Reference

Jahmir Young (born October 7, 2000) is an American professional basketball player for the Coachella Valley Lakers of the NBA G League. He played college basketball for the Charlotte 49ers and Maryland Terrapins.

== High school career ==
Young played basketball for St. Mary's Ryken High School in Leonardtown, Maryland in his first two years. For his junior season, he transferred to DeMatha Catholic High School in Hyattsville, Maryland due to a coaching change at St. Mary's Ryken. At DeMatha Catholic, he played alongside teammates: Hunter Dickinson, Justin Moore, Earl Timberlake, and Tyrell Ward. As a junior, Young averaged 11.7 points per game and helped his team win the Washington Catholic Athletic Conference title. On the Amateur Athletic Union circuit, he played for Team Takeover and won a Peach Jam title. As a senior, Young earned All-Conference honors and was ranked a top 10 senior in Maryland. A three-star recruit, he committed to playing college basketball for Charlotte over offers from Boston College, Hofstra, Old Dominion and La Salle.

== College career ==
As a freshman at Charlotte, Young averaged 12.5 points, 5.2 rebounds and 2.8 assists per game, and was named Third Team All-Conference USA (C-USA) and Freshman of the Year. He was an eight-time C-USA Freshman of the Week honoree, becoming the fourth player in league history to do so. On December 19, 2020, Young scored a sophomore season-high 27 points in a 76–72 win against North Carolina A&T. As a sophomore, he averaged 18 points, 4.9 rebounds and 2.5 assists per game, earning First Team All-C-USA honors. On January 17, 2022, Young scored a career-high 30 points in a 96–67 loss against Florida Atlantic. He repeated on the First Team All-C-USA as a junior. As a junior, Young averaged 19.6 points, 5.9 rebounds and 3.7 assists per game. On March 29, 2022, he declared for the 2022 NBA draft while maintaining his college eligibility and later entered the transfer portal on April 7.

On April 27, 2022, Young transferred to Maryland. Young, keeping his professional options open, also announced that he would continue with the NBA Draft process while maintaining his eligibility. In his first year with the program, Young, starring at point guard, led the renewal of the Maryland program under first-year head coach Kevin Willard. In 2023, Young was named second-team All-Big Ten by both coaches and media.

== Professional career ==
=== Grand Rapids Gold (2024–2025) ===
After going undrafted in the 2024 NBA draft, Young joined the Denver Nuggets for the 2024 NBA Summer League and on July 31, 2024, he signed with them. However, he was waived on October 8 and on October 28, he joined the Grand Rapids Gold.

=== Chicago Bulls (2025) ===
On February 19, 2025, Young signed a two-way contract with the Chicago Bulls. He made his NBA debut on March 4 against the Cleveland Cavaliers, recording one rebound and one assist. Young made six total appearances for Chicago during his rookie campaign, averaging 1.8 points, 0.5 rebounds, and 1.0 assists. He was waived by the Bulls on July 20.

=== Miami Heat (2025–2026) ===
On August 20, 2025, the Miami Heat signed Young to an Exhibit 10 contract. On October 18, the Heat converted Young's contract into a two-way contract. On April 10, 2026, Miami signed Young to a two-year, standard contract after a roster spot was cleared with the release of Terry Rozier. He made 14 appearances for the Heat during the 2025–26 NBA season, recording averages of 1.8 points, 0.3 rebounds, and 0.6 assists. On June 26, Miami declined their team option on going for the 2026–27 season, making him a free agent.

=== Coachella Valley Lakers (2026–present) ===
On September 29, 2026, the Coachella Valley Lakers acquired the returning player rights to Young.

== Career statistics ==
Legend
GP	Games played	GS	Games started	MPG	Minutes per game
FG%	Field goal percentage	3P%	3-point field goal percentage	FT%	Free throw percentage
RPG	Rebounds per game	APG	Assists per game	SPG	Steals per game
BPG	Blocks per game	PPG	Points per game	**Bold**	Career high

=== NBA ===
Year	Team	GP	GS	MPG	FG%	3P%	FT%	RPG	APG	SPG	BPG	PPG
2024–25	Chicago	6	0	**5.0**	**.800**	**.500**	**1.000**	**.5**	**1.0**	.0	.0	**1.8**
2025–26	Miami	**14**	0	4.1	.400	.333	**1.000**	.3	.6	**.1**	.0	**1.8**
Career		20	0	4.4	.467	.364	1.000	.4	.8	.1	.0	1.8

=== College ===
Year	Team	GP	GS	MPG	FG%	3P%	FT%	RPG	APG	SPG	BPG	PPG
2019–20	Charlotte	29	29	32.3	.426	**.373**	.738	5.2	2.8	**1.6**	.3	12.5
2020–21	Charlotte	25	25	**37.5**	.423	.338	.834	4.9	2.5	1.0	.3	18.0
2021–22	Charlotte	31	31	35.8	**.468**	.341	.892	**5.9**	3.7	1.1	**.5**	19.6
2022–23	Maryland	**35**	**35**	31.4	.415	.311	.831	4.6	3.1	1.3	.4	15.8
2023–24	Maryland	32	32	35.3	.404	.324	**.900**	4.9	**4.2**	1.3	.3	**20.4**
Career		152	152	34.3	.427	.337	.850	5.1	3.3	1.3	.4	17.3
