= Florida Atlantic Owls men's basketball statistical leaders =

The Florida Atlantic Owls men's basketball statistical leaders are individual statistical leaders of the Florida Atlantic Owls men's basketball program in various categories, including points, rebounds, assists, steals, and blocks. Within those areas, the lists identify single-game, single-season, and career leaders. Since the 2023–24 season, the Owls have represented Florida Atlantic University in the NCAA Division I American Conference.

Florida Atlantic began competing in intercollegiate basketball in 1988. These lists are updated through the 2022–23 season.

== Scoring ==
Career
Rk	Player	Points	Seasons
1	Greg Gantt	1,972	2009–10 2010–11 2011–12 2012–13
2	Michael Forrest	1,619	2018–19 2019–20 2020–21 2021–22 2022–23
3	Earnest Crumbley	1,559	2000–01 2001–02 2002–03 2003–04
4	Paul Graham III	1,521	2005–06 2006–07 2007–08 2008–09
5	Craig Buchanan	1,501	1993–94 1994–95 1995–96 1996–97
6	Alijah Martin	1,476	2020–21 2021–22 2022–23 2023–24
7	Johnell Davis	1,431	2020–21 2021–22 2022–23 2023–24
8	Jeff Cowans	1,388	2000–01 2001–02 2002–03 2003–04
9	Jailyn Ingram	1,334	2016–17 2017–18 2018–19 2019–20 2020–21
10	Carlos Monroe	1,316	2005–06 2006–07 2007–08 2008–09

Season
Rk	Player	Points	Season
1	Greg Gantt	677	2012–13
2	Johnell Davis	618	2023–24
3	Paul Graham III	575	2008–09
4	Pablo Bertone	570	2013–14
5	Ron McLin	544	1988–89
6	Shane Taylor	540	1990–91
7	Vladislav Goldin	534	2023–24
8	Damon Arnette	525	1998–99
9	Mike Bell	516	2004–05
10	Anthony Adger	513	2018–19

Single game
Rk	Player	Points	Season	Opponent
1	DeAndre Rice	39	2006–07	Troy
	Earnest Crumbley	39	2003–04	Campbell
3	Ray Schultz	38	1988–89	Florida Memorial
4	Johnell Davis	36	2022–23	UAB
5	Marlon Jemerson	35	1993–94	Centenary
	Mike Bell	35	2003–04	Lipscomb
	Johnell Davis	35	2023–24	Arizona
8	Greg Gantt	34	2012–13	Stetson
	Quinton Young	34	2004–05	Campbell
	Ron McLin	34	1988–89	Flagler
	Shane Taylor	34	1990–91	SMU
	Pablo Bertone	34	2013–14	UAB
	Cornelius Taylor	34	2019–20	Rice
	Alijah Martin	34	2021–22	FIU
	Johnell Davis	34	2023–24	UTSA

== Rebounds ==
Career
Rk	Player	Rebounds	Seasons
1	Carlos Monroe	717	2005–06 2006–07 2007–08 2008–09
2	Brett Royster	684	2007–08 2008–09 2009–10 2010–11
3	Vladislav Goldin	655	2021–22 2022–23 2023–24
4	Jailyn Ingram	630	2016–17 2017–18 2018–19 2019–20 2020–21
5	Ronald Delph	627	2015–16 2016–17 2017–18
6	Johnell Davis	621	2020–21 2021–22 2022–23 2023–24
7	Alijah Martin	616	2020–21 2021–22 2022–23 2023–24
8	Kelvin Penn	589	2011–12 2012–13 2013–14 2014–15
9	Robert Williams	575	2000–01 2001–02 2002–03 2003–04 2004–05
10	Jordan McCoy	554	2009–10 2010–11 2011–12 2012–13

Season
Rk	Player	Rebounds	Season
1	Carlos Monroe	312	2007–08
2	Justin Raffington	271	2013–14
3	Ronald Delph	270	2017–18
4	Raheim Brown	263	2001–02
5	Mike Bell	262	2003–04
	Daryl Kanning	262	1989–90
7	Vladislav Goldin	255	2022–23
8	Carlos Monroe	254	2006–07
9	Mike Bell	252	2004–05
10	Baba Miller	237	2024–25

Single game
Rk	Player	Rebounds	Season	Opponent
1	Mike Bell	23	2003–04	Stetson
2	Daryl Kanning	21	1989–90	Methodist

== Assists ==
Career
Rk	Player	Assists	Seasons
1	Alex Tucker	538	2008–09 2009–10 2010–11 2011–12
2	Earnest Crumbley	505	2000–01 2001–02 2002–03 2003–04
3	Raymond Taylor	425	2009–10 2010–11 2011–12
4	Bryan Greenlee	346	2020–21 2021–22 2022–23 2023–24
5	Michael Forrest	339	2018–19 2019–20 2020–21 2021–22 2022–23
6	Brent Crews	273	2005–06 2006–07
7	Marquan Botley	272	2013–14 2014–15 2015–16
8	Nick Rutherford	243	2015–16 2016–17
9	Donald Smith	239	1989–90 1990–91
10	Paul Graham III	230	2005–06 2006–07 2007–08 2008–09

Season
Rk	Player	Assists	Season
1	Raymond Taylor	177	2009–10
2	Leland Walker	149	2024–25
3	Earnest Crumbley	145	2003–04
4	Alex Tucker	141	2009–10
5	Brent Crews	140	2006–07
6	Alex Tucker	139	2008–09
7	Alex Tucker	136	2010–11
8	Earnest Crumbley	133	2002–03
	Brent Crews	133	2005–06
10	Nick Rutherford	129	2016–17

Single game
Rk	Player	Assists	Season	Opponent
1	Alex Tucker	16	2009–10	FIU
2	Raymond Taylor	13	2009–10	South Alabama
3	Alex Tucker	12	2010–11	Western Kentucky
	Raymond Taylor	12	2010–11	Warner
	Leland Walker	12	2024–25	Florida International
6	Alex Tucker	11	2008–09	ULM
	Alex Tucker	11	2008–09	New Orleans
	Phillip Huyler	11	1996–97	Centenary
	Earnest Crumbley	11	2003–04	Jacksonville
	Brent Crews	11	2006–07	FIU
	Baba Miller	11	2024–25	UTSA

== Steals ==
Career
Rk	Player	Steals	Seasons
1	Earnest Crumbley	181	2000–01 2001–02 2002–03 2003–04
2	Phillip Huyler	179	1994–95 1995–96 1996–97
3	Damon Arnette	163	1996–97 1997–98 1998–99
4	Johnell Davis	155	2020–21 2021–22 2022–23 2023–24
	Alijah Martin	155	2020–21 2021–22 2022–23 2023–24
6	Michael Harvey	154	1992–93 1993–94 1994–95 1995–96
7	Michael Forrest	151	2018–19 2019–20 2020–21 2021–22 2022–23
8	Craig Buchanan	135	1993–94 1994–95 1995–96 1996–97
9	Raymond Taylor	128	2009–10 2010–11 2011–12
10	Bryan Greenlee	122	2020–21 2021–22 2022–23 2023–24

Season
Rk	Player	Steals	Season
1	Phillip Huyler	86	1996–97
2	Damon Arnette	76	1998–99
3	Cedric Powell	71	1998–99
4	Shane Taylor	63	1990–91
	Kahleaf Watson	63	2004–05
6	Phillip Huyler	62	1995–96
7	Kahleaf Watson	58	2003–04
8	Damon Arnette	56	1997–98
	Johnell Davis	56	2022–23
	Alijah Martin	56	2023–24

Single game
Rk	Player	Steals	Season	Opponent
1	Phillip Huyler	11	1996–97	Campbell

== Blocks ==
Career
Rk	Player	Blocks	Seasons
1	Brett Royster	301	2007–08 2008–09 2009–10 2010–11
2	Kelvin Penn	223	2011–12 2012–13 2013–14 2014–15
3	Ronald Delph	167	2015–16 2016–17 2017–18
4	Vladislav Goldin	142	2021–22 2022–23 2023–24
5	Cedric Peoples	119	1993–94 1994–95 1995–96 1996–97
6	Mike Bell	107	2003–04 2004–05
7	Bjorn Sjolund	93	1993–94 1994–95 1995–96 1996–97
8	Devin Williams	85	2025–26
9	David Cargill	73	1990–91 1991–92
	Raheim Brown	73	2000–01 2001–02

Season
Rk	Player	Blocks	Season
1	Brett Royster	97	2010–11
2	Brett Royster	90	2009–10
3	Devin Williams	85	2025–26
4	Brett Royster	73	2008–09
5	Kelvin Penn	71	2013–14
6	Kelvin Penn	69	2012–13
7	Ronald Delph	63	2017–18
8	Ronald Delph	61	2015–16
9	Raheim Brown	59	2001–02
10	Baba Miller	58	2024–25

Single game
Rk	Player	Blocks	Season	Opponent
1	Wes Edwards	8	2002–03	Nova Southeastern
	Mike Bell	8	2004–05	Campbell
