= 2021–22 Florida Atlantic Owls men's basketball team =

American college basketball season

2021–22 Florida Atlantic Owls men's basketball

CBI, First Round
- Conference: Conference USA
- East Division
- Record: 19–15 (11–7 C-USA)
- Head coach: Dusty May (4th season)
- Assistant coaches: Kyle Church; Todd Abernethy; Drew Williamson
- Home arena: FAU Arena

2021–22 Conference USA men's basketball standings
	Conf.				Overall
Team	W		L	PCT	W		L	PCT
East
Middle Tennessee	13	–	5	.722	26	–	11	.703
Western Kentucky	11	–	7	.611	19	–	13	.594
Florida Atlantic	11	–	7	.611	19	–	15	.559
Charlotte	10	–	8	.556	17	–	14	.548
Old Dominion	8	–	10	.444	13	–	19	.406
FIU	5	–	13	.278	15	–	17	.469
Marshall	4	–	14	.222	12	–	21	.364
West
North Texas	16	–	2	.889	25	–	7	.781
UAB †	14	–	4	.778	27	–	8	.771
Louisiana Tech	12	–	6	.667	24	–	10	.706
UTEP	11	–	7	.611	20	–	14	.588
Rice	7	–	11	.389	16	–	17	.485
UTSA	3	–	15	.167	10	–	22	.313
Southern Miss	1	–	17	.056	7	–	26	.212
† 2022 C-USA Tournament winner

The 2021–22 Florida Atlantic Owls men's basketball team represented Florida Atlantic University in the 2021–22 NCAA Division I men's basketball season. The Owls, led by fourth-year head coach Dusty May, played their home games at FAU Arena in Boca Raton, Florida as members of East Division of Conference USA.

== Previous season ==
The Owls finished the 2020-21 season 13–10, 7–5 in C-USA play to finish in fourth place in East Division. They defeated UTEP in the second round of the C-USA tournament but then lost to Louisiana Tech in the quarterfinals.

== Offseason ==
=== Departures ===
Name	Number	Pos.	Height	Weight	Year	Hometown	Reason for departure
Jailyn Ingram	15	F	6'7"	219	Senior	Madison, GA	Graduate transferred to Georgia
Branndon Patrick	22	G	6'7"	173	Freshman	North Lauderdale, FL	Walk-on; didn't return
Karlis Silins	25	F/C	6'11"	249	RS Junior	Riga, Latvia	Signed to play professionally in Latvia with BK Liepāja
Joe French	30	G	6'5"	180	RS Junior	Orlando, FL	Transferred to Bethune–Cookman

=== Incoming transfers ===
Name	Number	Pos.	Height	Weight	Year	Hometown	Previous School
Bitumba Baruti	20	F	6'7"	220	Graduate Student	Lubumbashi, DR Congo	East Carolina
Brandon Weatherspoon	23	G	6'4"	186	Junior	Canton, MS	Holmes CC
Vladislav Goldin	50	F	7'1"	240	Sophomore	Nalchik, Russia	Texas Tech

=== 2021 recruiting class ===
College recruiting information
Name	Hometown	School	Height	Weight	Commit date
Bogdan Zimonjić; SG	Gimnazija "Sveti Sava"	Belgrade, Serbia	6 ft 5 in (1.96 m)	190 lb (86 kg)	Apr 19, 2021
Bogdan Zimonjić; SG	Recruit ratings: Scout: Rivals: (NR)				
Tre Carroll; PF	Charlotte	Punta Gorda, FL	6 ft 7 in (2.01 m)	205 lb (93 kg)	Oct 17, 2020
Tre Carroll; PF	Recruit ratings: Scout: Rivals: 247Sports: (NR)				
Overall recruit ranking:
Note: In many cases, Scout, Rivals, 247Sports, On3, and ESPN may conflict in their listings of height and weight.; In these cases, the average was taken. ESPN grades are on a 100-point scale.; Sources: "2021 Team Ranking". Rivals.

== Roster ==
2021–22 Florida Atlantic Owls men's basketball team
Players
Coaches

Pos.	#	Name	Height	Weight	Year	Previous school	Hometown
G	0	Nick Boyd (redshirt)	6 ft 3 in (1.91 m)	175 lb (79 kg)	So	Don Bosco Prep	Garnerville, New York
F	1	Madiaw Niang	6 ft 9 in (2.06 m)	230 lb (104 kg)	Sr	DME Academy	Dakar, Senegal
G	2	Everett Winchester	6 ft 6 in (1.98 m)	212 lb (96 kg)	GS	Gilman School; Wright State	Baltimore, Maryland
F	3	Giancarlo Rosado	6 ft 8 in (2.03 m)	247 lb (112 kg)	So	Palm Beach Lakes HS	West Palm Beach, Florida
G	4	Bryan Greenlee	6 ft 0 in (1.83 m)	191 lb (87 kg)	Jr	The Rock School; Minnesota	Gainesville, Florida
G	5	Bogdan Zimonjic	6 ft 5 in (1.96 m)	190 lb (86 kg)	Fr	Saint Sava Gymmasium	Belgrade, Serbia
G	10	Johnell Davis	6 ft 4 in (1.93 m)	203 lb (92 kg)	So	21st Century Charter	Gary, Indiana
G	11	Michael Forrest	6 ft 1 in (1.85 m)	174 lb (79 kg)	Sr	Blanche Ely HS	Lauderhill, Florida
F	12	Tre Carroll	6 ft 7 in (2.01 m)	227 lb (103 kg)	Fr	Charlotte HS	Punta Gorda, Florida
G	13	Kenan Blackshear	6 ft 6 in (1.98 m)	215 lb (98 kg)	So	Jones HS	Orlando, Florida
G	15	Alijah Martin	6 ft 2 in (1.88 m)	210 lb (95 kg)	So	North Pike HS	Summit, Mississippi
F	20	Bitumba Baruti	6 ft 7 in (2.01 m)	220 lb (100 kg)	GS	Mountain Mission School; East Carolina	Lubumbashi, Democratic Republic of the Congo
G	21	Alejandro Ralat (W)	6 ft 0 in (1.83 m)	160 lb (73 kg)	RS So	Saint Andrew's School	San Juan, Puerto Rico
G	23	Brandon Weatherspoon	6 ft 4 in (1.93 m)	186 lb (84 kg)	Jr	Canton HS; Holmes CC	Canton, Mississippi
F	32	Brant Ulmer (W)	6 ft 7 in (2.01 m)	201 lb (91 kg)	Jr	Suwannee HS	Live Oak, Florida
F	35	Dardan Kapiti	6 ft 10 in (2.08 m)	213 lb (97 kg)	Jr	The Rock School	Pristina, Kosovo
C	50	Vladislav Goldin	7 ft 1 in (2.16 m)	240 lb (109 kg)	So	Putnam Science Academy; Texas Tech	Nalchik, Russia

Head coach

- Dusty May (Indiana)

Assistant coach(es)

- Kyle Church (Charlotte)
- Todd Abernethy (Mississippi)
- Drew Williamson (Old Dominion)

Legend

- (C) Team captain
- (S) Suspended
- (I) Ineligible
- (W) Walk-on
- Injured
- Current redshirt

Roster
Last update: September 3, 2021

== Schedule and results ==
Date time, TV	Rank^{#}	Opponent^{#}	Result	Record	Site (attendance) city, state
Exhibition
November 2, 2021*; 7:00 pm		Lynn	W 69–54		FAU Arena; Boca Raton, FL
Non-conference regular season
November 10, 2021*; 9:00 p.m., Stadium		at New Mexico	L 92–99	0–1	The Pit (8,553); Albuquerque, NM
November 13, 2021*; 4:00 pm, CUSA.tv		Warner	W 78-56	1–1	FAU Arena (1,089); Boca Raton, FL
November 16, 2021*; 6:00 pm, CBSSN		Miami (FL)	L 66–68	1–2	FAU Arena (2,772); Boca Raton, FL
November 19, 2021*; 6:00 pm, CUSA.tv		UT Martin; The Paradise Classic	W 75–67	2–2	FAU Arena (1,064); Boca Raton, FL
November 20, 2021*; 6:00 pm, CUSA.tv		North Dakota; The Paradise Classic	W 98–79	3–2	FAU Arena (926); Boca Raton, FL
November 22, 2021*; 7:00 pm, CUSA.tv		Troy; The Paradise Classic	L 78–83 ^{OT}	3–3	FAU Arena (988); Boca Raton, FL
November 28, 2021*; 2:00 pm, CUSA.tv		James Madison	L 65–69	3–4	FAU Arena (939); Boca Raton, FL
December 1, 2021*; 7:00 pm, CUSA.tv		Stetson	W 83–73	4–4	FAU Arena (1,347); Boca Raton, FL
December 5, 2021*; 2:00 pm, CUSA.tv		North Florida	W 76–41	5–4	FAU Arena (1,358); Boca Raton, FL
December 8, 2021*; 7:00 pm, CUSA.tv		Palm Beach Atlantic	W 84–63	6–4	FAU Arena (1,045); Boca Raton, FL
December 15, 2021*; 7:00 pm, MASN/ESPN+		at VCU	L 46–66	6–5	Siegel Center (6,907); Richmond, VA
December 17, 2021*; 7:00 pm, CUSA.tv		Florida Tech	W 78–55	7–5	FAU Arena (1,089); Boca Raton, FL
December 21, 2021*; 7:00 pm, ESPN3/ESPN+		at High Point	L 52–55	7–6	Qubein Arena (2,216); High Point, NC
Conference USA regular season
January 8, 2022; 7:00 pm, ESPN3/ESPN+		at Marshall	W 90–77	8–6 (1–0)	Cam Henderson Center (4,115); Huntington, WV
January 13, 2022; 7:00 pm, CUSA.tv		at Middle Tennessee	L 57–70	8–7 (1–1)	Murphy Center (2,515); Murfreesboro, TN
January 15, 2022; 4:00 pm, ESPN3/ESPN+		at UAB	L 65–76	8–8 (1–2)	Bartow Arena (3,456); Birmingham, AL
January 17, 2022; 7:00 pm, CUSA.tv		Charlotte; Rescheduled from December 30	W 96–67	9–8 (2–2)	FAU Arena (1,029); Boca Raton, FL
January 20, 2022; 7:00 pm, CBSSN		Western Kentucky	W 78–69	10–8 (3–2)	FAU Arena (1,305); Boca Raton, FL
January 22, 2022; 4:00 pm, CUSA.tv		Marshall	W 71–60	11–8 (4–2)	FAU Arena (1,721); Boca Raton, FL
January 27, 2022; 9:00 pm, CUSA.tv		at UTEP	L 68–70	11–9 (4–3)	Don Haskins Center (4,458); El Paso, TX
January 29, 2022; 2:00 pm, ESPN3/ESPN+		at UTSA	W 73–64	12–9 (5–3)	Convocation Center (1,129); San Antonio, TX
February 3, 2022; 7:00 pm, ESPN+		Louisiana Tech	W 83–73	13–9 (6–3)	FAU Arena (1,683); Boca Raton, FL
February 5, 2022; 4:00 pm, ESPN3/ESPN+		Southern Miss	W 84–57	14–9 (7–3)	FAU Arena (1,366); Boca Raton, FL
February 8, 2022; 6:00 pm, CUSA.tv		Old Dominion; Rescheduled from January 1	W 81–62	15–9 (8–3)	FAU Arena (1,106); Boca Raton, FL
February 10, 2022; 8:00 pm, ESPN+		at Western Kentucky	L 69–76	15–10 (8–4)	E. A. Diddle Arena (3,547); Bowling Green, KY
February 17, 2022; 7:00 pm, ESPN+		North Texas	L 51–54	15–11 (8–5)	FAU Arena (1,774); Boca Raton, FL
February 19, 2022; 4:00 pm, CUSA.tv		Middle Tennessee	L 79–87	15–12 (8–6)	FAU Arena (1,977); Boca Raton, FL
February 24, 2022; 7:00 pm, ESPN+		at Old Dominion	L 51–70	15–13 (8–7)	Chartway Arena (4,376); Norfolk, VA
February 26, 2022; 4:00 pm, ESPN+		at Charlotte	W 74–69	16–13 (9–7)	Dale F. Halton Arena (3,136); Charlotte, NC
March 3, 2022; 7:00 pm, ESPN+		at FIU	W 71–51	17–13 (10–7)	Ocean Bank Convocation Center (3,763); Miami, FL
March 5, 2022; 2:00 pm, ESPN+		FIU	W 84–76	18–13 (11–7)	FAU Arena (2,027); Boca Raton, FL
Conference USA tournament
March 9, 2022; 9:30 pm, ESPN+	(E3)	vs. (W7) Southern Miss; Second round	W 86–59	19–13	Ford Center at The Star; Frisco, TX
March 10, 2022; 9:30 pm, Stadium	(E3)	vs. (W2) UAB; Quarterfinals	L 66–80	19–14	Ford Center at The Star; Frisco, TX
CBI
March 20, 2022; 2:30 pm, FloHoops	(5)	vs. (12) Northern Colorado; First Round	L 71–74	19–15	Ocean Center (762); Daytona Beach, FL
*Non-conference game. ^{#}Rankings from AP Poll. (#) Tournament seedings in parentheses. All times are in Eastern.
