= Alijah Martin =

American basketball player (born 2001)

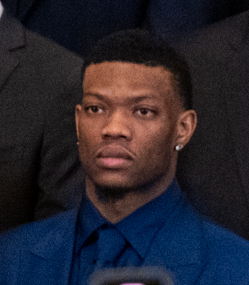
- Martin in 2025

No. 55 – Toronto Raptors
- Position: Shooting guard
- League: NBA

Personal information
- Born: December 26, 2001 (age 24) Summit, Mississippi, U.S.
- Listed height: 6 ft 2 in (1.88 m)
- Listed weight: 210 lb (95 kg)

Career information
- High school: North Pike (Summit, Mississippi)
- College: Florida Atlantic (2020–2024); Florida (2024–2025)
- NBA draft: 2025: 2nd round, 39th overall pick
- Drafted by: Toronto Raptors
- Playing career: 2025–present

Career history
- 2025–present: Toronto Raptors

Career highlights
- All-NBA G League Third Team (2026); NBA G League All Defensive Team (2026); NBA G League All-Rookie Team (2026); NCAA champion (2025); First-team All-C-USA (2023); Second-team All-AAC (2024); Third-team All-C-USA (2022); C-USA tournament MVP (2023); NCAA Men's Final Four All-Tournament Team (2023)
- Stats at NBA.com
- Stats at Basketball Reference

Alijah Randall Edwin Martin (born December 26, 2001) is an American professional basketball player for the Toronto Raptors of the National Basketball Association (NBA). He played college basketball for the Florida Atlantic Owls and the Florida Gators.

== High school career ==
Martin attended North Pike High School in Summit, Mississippi. A multi-sport athlete, he played football as a quarterback, passing for 2,100 yards and rushing for 1,300 yards in his senior season. In his senior basketball season, he averaged 25.4 points, 8.7 rebounds, and 3.4 steals per game, before committing to playing college basketball for Florida Atlantic.

== College career ==
After playing sparingly as a freshman for the Owls, he averaged 13.9 points and 5.3 rebounds per game as a sophomore, being named to the all-conference third team. The following season, he averaged 13.4 points and 5.3 rebounds per game, helping lead Florida Atlantic to the school's first ever Final Four appearance. In his final season with the Owls, he averaged 13.1 points, 5.9 rebounds and 1.6 assists per game, before entering the transfer portal.

In April 2024, Martin announced his decision to transfer to the University of Florida. He made an instant impact, emerging as the Gators' starting shooting guard. In a game against Southern Illinois, he recorded 32 points, nine rebounds, and five assists, leading Florida to a 93–68 victory. Against Auburn in the Final Four, he scored 17 points in a 79–73 victory. In the National Championship Game against Houston, he tallied seven points, helping lead the Gators to the school's third national championship.

== Professional career ==
On June 25, 2025, Martin was selected with the 39th overall pick by the Toronto Raptors in the second round of the 2025 NBA draft. On July 10, the Raptors announced that they had signed Martin to a two-way contract. He made 23 appearances for Toronto during the 2025–26 NBA season, recording averages of 2.2 points, 0.9 rebounds, and 0.5 assists.

On July 2, 2026, Martin re-signed with the Raptors on a two-year, $4.76 million contract. He had arthroscopic knee surgery in the off-season that prevented him from competing in the NBA Summer League and fully participating in Toronto's training camp and pre-season games.

On November 6, 2026, Martin set a new career high with 27 points in the Toronto Raptors' second NBA Cup game of the season, a win over the Milwaukee Bucks. He shot 9-of-11 from the field, including 6-of-7 from three-point range, and recorded a +22 plus-minus.

== Career statistics ==
Legend
GP	Games played	GS	Games started	MPG	Minutes per game
FG%	Field goal percentage	3P%	3-point field goal percentage	FT%	Free throw percentage
RPG	Rebounds per game	APG	Assists per game	SPG	Steals per game
BPG	Blocks per game	PPG	Points per game	**Bold**	Career high

=== NBA ===
Year	Team	GP	GS	MPG	FG%	3P%	FT%	RPG	APG	SPG	BPG	PPG
2025–26	Toronto	23	0	6.3	.320	.190	.789	.9	.5	.3	.2	2.2
Career		23	0	6.3	.320	.190	.789	.9	.5	.3	.2	2.2

=== College ===
Year	Team	GP	GS	MPG	FG%	3P%	FT%	RPG	APG	SPG	BPG	PPG
2020–21	Florida Atlantic	21	2	9.2	**.471**	.349	.615	2.4	.8	.4	.1	4.2
2021–22	Florida Atlantic	33	33	29.2	.458	**.400**	.753	5.3	1.5	**1.6**	**.4**	13.9
2022–23	Florida Atlantic	36	21	26.4	.438	.372	**.788**	5.3	1.4	1.0	.3	13.4
2023–24	Florida Atlantic	34	30	**30.6**	.414	.338	.750	**5.9**	1.6	**1.6**	.3	13.1
2024–25	Florida	**38**	**36**	30.4	.452	.350	.761	4.5	**2.2**	1.5	.2	**14.4**
Career		162	122	26.5	.442	.364	.760	4.9	1.6	1.3	.3	12.5
