= 2021–22 UTEP Miners men's basketball team =

American college basketball season

2021–22 UTEP Miners men's basketball

The Basketball Classic, Second Round
- Conference: Conference USA
- West Division
- Record: 20–14 (11–7 CUSA)
- Head coach: Joe Golding (1st season)
- Associate head coach: Jeremy Cox
- Assistant coaches: Butch Pierre; Earl Boykins
- Home arena: Don Haskins Center

2021–22 Conference USA men's basketball standings
	Conf.				Overall
Team	W		L	PCT	W		L	PCT
East
Middle Tennessee	13	–	5	.722	26	–	11	.703
Western Kentucky	11	–	7	.611	19	–	13	.594
Florida Atlantic	11	–	7	.611	19	–	15	.559
Charlotte	10	–	8	.556	17	–	14	.548
Old Dominion	8	–	10	.444	13	–	19	.406
FIU	5	–	13	.278	15	–	17	.469
Marshall	4	–	14	.222	12	–	21	.364
West
North Texas	16	–	2	.889	25	–	7	.781
UAB †	14	–	4	.778	27	–	8	.771
Louisiana Tech	12	–	6	.667	24	–	10	.706
UTEP	11	–	7	.611	20	–	14	.588
Rice	7	–	11	.389	16	–	17	.485
UTSA	3	–	15	.167	10	–	22	.313
Southern Miss	1	–	17	.056	7	–	26	.212
† 2022 C-USA Tournament winner

The 2021–22 UTEP Miners men's basketball team represented the University of Texas at El Paso during the 2021–22 NCAA Division I men's basketball season. The team was led by first-year head coach Joe Golding, and played their home games at the Don Haskins Center in El Paso, Texas as a member of Conference USA.

== Previous season ==
The Miners finished the 2020–21 season 12–12, 8–8 in C-USA play to finish in fifth place in West Division. They lost in the second round of the C-USA tournament to Florida Atlantic.

On April 6, 2021, Rodney Terry left for UTEP to accept an assistant coaching position at Texas. The Miners announced the hiring of Abilene Christian head coach Joe Golding as its next head coach on April 13.

== Offseason ==
=== Departures ===
Name	Number	Pos.	Height	Weight	Year	Hometown	Reason for departure
Eric Vila	4	F	6'11"	225	RS Senior	Girona, Spain	Graduated
Bryson Williams	11	F	6'8"	230	RS Senior	Fresno, CA	Graduate transferred to Texas Tech
Kristian Sjolund	12	F	6'8"	206	RS Sophomore	Kongsberg, Norway	Transferred to Portland
Vuk Vulikic	20	G	6'4"	198	Freshman	Belgrade, Serbia	Transferred to UC San Diego
Adam Hess	23	G	6'5"	195	RS Sophomore	Westlake, CA	Transferred to Eastern New Mexico
Efe Odigie	32	F	6'9"	240	Junior	Houston, TX	Transferred to Troy

=== Incoming transfers ===
Name	Number	Pos.	Height	Weight	Year	Hometown	Previous School
Bonke Maring	11	F	6'10"		Junior	Cypress, TX	Blinn College
Jamari Sibley	14	F	6'8"	200	Sophomore	Milwaukee, WI	Georgetown
Alfred Hollins	15	F	6'6"	205	Senior	San Francisco, CA	Oregon State
Jorell Saterfield	23	F	6'4"	190	Junior	Chicago, IL	Ranger College

=== Recruiting class of 2021 ===
College recruiting information
Name	Hometown	School	Height	Weight	Commit date
Kezza Giffa; G	Paris, France		6 ft 2 in (1.88 m)	N/A	May 28, 2021
Kezza Giffa; G	Recruit ratings: Scout: Rivals: 247Sports: ESPN:				
Kevin Kalu; F	Baltimore, MD	Our Lady of Mt Carmel School	6 ft 9 in (2.06 m)	N/A	Aug 26, 2021
Kevin Kalu; F	Recruit ratings: Scout: Rivals: 247Sports: ESPN:				
Overall recruit ranking:
Note: In many cases, Scout, Rivals, 247Sports, On3, and ESPN may conflict in their listings of height and weight.; In these cases, the average was taken. ESPN grades are on a 100-point scale.; Sources: "2021 Team Ranking". Rivals.

=== Recruiting class of 2022 ===
College recruiting information (2021)
Name	Hometown	School	Height	Weight	Commit date
Khalfani Hill; SF	Toronto, ON	Excel Hoops Training Institute	6 ft 9 in (2.06 m)	N/A	Oct 24, 2021
Khalfani Hill; SF	Recruit ratings: Scout: Rivals: 247Sports: ESPN:				
Overall recruit ranking:
Note: In many cases, Scout, Rivals, 247Sports, On3, and ESPN may conflict in their listings of height and weight.; In these cases, the average was taken. ESPN grades are on a 100-point scale.; Sources: "2022 Team Ranking". Rivals.

== Roster ==
2021–22 UTEP Miners men's basketball team
Players
Coaches

Pos.	#	Name	Height	Weight	Year	Previous school	Hometown
G	0	Souley Boum	6 ft 3 in (1.91 m)	160 lb (73 kg)	RS Sr	Oakland Tech HS; San Francisco	Oakland, California
F	1	Tydus Verhoeven	6 ft 9 in (2.06 m)	235 lb (107 kg)	RS Sr	Manteca HS; Duquesne	Manteca, California
G	2	Christian Agnew	6 ft 2 in (1.88 m)	182 lb (83 kg)	Sr	John Glenn HS; North Alabama	Detroit, Michigan
G	3	Keonte Kennedy	6 ft 5 in (1.96 m)	180 lb (82 kg)	RS Jr	Westlake HS; Xavier	Austin, Texas
G	4	Kezza Giffa	6 ft 2 in (1.88 m)	160 lb (73 kg)	Fr	Levallois Metropolitans 92	Paris, France
G	5	Emmanuel White	6 ft 5 in (1.96 m)	180 lb (82 kg)	RS Jr	Obra D. Tompkins HS; Coastal Bend College	Katy, Texas
F	11	Bonke Maring	6 ft 10 in (2.08 m)	240 lb (109 kg)	Jr	Cy-Springs HS; Blinn College	Cypress, Texas
G	13	Cam Clardy	6 ft 1 in (1.85 m)	192 lb (87 kg)	So	Bridgeland High School	Cypress, Texas
F	14	Jamari Sibley	6 ft 8 in (2.03 m)	184 lb (83 kg)	So	Oak Hill Academy; Georgetown	Milwaukee, Wisconsin
F	15	Alfred Hollins	6 ft 6 in (1.98 m)	215 lb (98 kg)	Sr	Oregon State	San Francisco, California
F	20	Kevin Kalu	6 ft 9 in (2.06 m)	235 lb (107 kg)	Fr	Our Lady of Mount Carmel School	Baltimore, Maryland
F	21	Ze'Rik Onyema	6 ft 8 in (2.03 m)	220 lb (100 kg)	So	John Jay High School	San Antonio, Texas
G/F	23	Jorell Saterfield	6 ft 4 in (1.93 m)	191 lb (87 kg)	Jr	Mayfield HS; Ranger College	Chicago, Illinois
G	24	Jamal Bieniemy	6 ft 5 in (1.96 m)	177 lb (80 kg)	Sr	Obra D. Tompkins HS; Oklahoma	New Orleans, Louisiana
F	33	Gilles Dekoninck	6 ft 6 in (1.98 m)	220 lb (100 kg)	RS Sr	Huntington Prep; Fresno State	Diest, Belgium

Head coach

- Joe Golding (Abilene Christian)

Assistant coach(es)

- Jeremy Cox (Colorado Mesa)
- Butch Pierre (Mississippi State)
- Earl Boykins (Eastern Michigan)

Legend

- (C) Team captain
- (S) Suspended
- (I) Ineligible
- (W) Walk-on
- Injured
- Current redshirt

Roster

== Schedule and results ==
Date time, TV	Rank^{#}	Opponent^{#}	Result	Record	Site (attendance) city, state
Non-conference regular season
November 9, 2021*; 7:00 p.m., CUSA.tv		Western New Mexico	W 85–57	1–0	Don Haskins Center (6,751); El Paso, TX
November 13, 2021*; 7:00 p.m., ESPN+		at New Mexico State; Battle of I-10	L 71–77	1–1	Pan American Center (8,089); Las Cruces, NM
November 16, 2021*; 7:00 p.m., CUSA.tv		Northern New Mexico	W 88–53	2–1	Don Haskins Center (3,808); El Paso, TX
November 19, 2021*; 8:00 p.m., WCC Network		at Pacific; Golden Turkey Classic	W 73–64	3–1	Alex G. Spanos Center (1,514); Stockton, CA
November 22, 2021*; 7:00 p.m., CUSA.tv		UC Riverside; Golden Turkey Classic	L 40–52	3–2	Don Haskins Center (4,037); El Paso, TX
November 24, 2021*; 7:00 p.m., CUSA.tv		Florida A&M; Golden Turkey Classic	W 67–53	4–2	Don Haskins Center (4,196); El Paso, TX
December 3, 2021*; 6:00 p.m., Stadium		New Mexico State; Battle of I-10	L 69–72	4–3	Don Haskins Center (6,392); El Paso, TX
December 7, 2021*; 7:00 p.m., ESPN+		at No. 8 Kansas	L 52–78	4–4	T-Mobile Center (15,500); Kansas City, MO
December 12, 2021*; 1:00 p.m., Stadium		at New Mexico	W 77–69	5–4	The Pit (9,044); Albuquerque, NM
December 16, 2021*; 7:00 p.m., CUSA.tv		McNeese State	W 82–72	6–4	Don Haskins Center (5,522); El Paso, TX
December 21, 2021*; 7:30 p.m., CUSA.tv		North Carolina Central; Don Haskins Sun Bowl Invitational semifinals	W 70–61	7–4	Don Haskins Center (4,047); El Paso, TX
December 22, 2021*; 7:30 p.m., CUSA.tv		Bradley; Don Haskins Sun Bowl Invitational	L 66–73	7–5	Don Haskins Center (4,082); El Paso, TX
Conference USA regular season
December 30, 2021; 5:30 p.m., CUSA.tv		at UAB	L 62–75	7–6 (0–1)	Bartow Arena (2,795); Birmingham, AL
January 6, 2022; 8:00 p.m., CBSSN		Louisiana Tech	L 52–64	7–7 (0–2)	Don Haskins Center (3,701); El Paso, TX
January 8, 2022; 7:00 p.m., CUSA.tv		Southern Miss	W 87-54	8–7 (1–2)	Don Haskins Center (3,841); El Paso, TX
January 13, 2022; 5:00 p.m., ESPN+		at Charlotte	L 53–66	8–8 (1–3)	Dale F. Halton Arena; Charlotte, NC
January 15, 2022; 5:00 p.m., ESPN+		at Old Dominion	W 78–70	9–8 (2–3)	Chartway Arena (4,528); Norfolk, VA
January 20, 2022; 7:00 p.m., CUSA.tv		UTSA	W 69–64	10–8 (3–3)	Don Haskins Center (5,021); El Paso, TX
January 23, 2022; 2:00 p.m., CUSA.tv		at UTSA	W 59–54	11–8 (4–3)	Convocation Center (924); San Antonio, TX
January 27, 2022; 7:00 p.m., CUSA.tv		Florida Atlantic	W 70–68	12–8 (5–3)	Don Haskins Center (4,458); El Paso, TX
January 29, 2022; 7:00 p.m., CUSA.tv		FIU	W 79–68	13–8 (6–3)	Don Haskins Center (4,864); El Paso, TX
February 5, 2022; 1:00 p.m., CUSA.tv		at Rice	W 72–70	14–8 (7–3)	Tudor Fieldhouse (1,872); Houston, TX
February 7, 2022; 6:00 p.m., ESPN+		at North Texas; Rescheduled from February 3	L 58–66	14–9 (7–4)	The Super Pit (3,813); Denton, TX
February 13, 2022; 1:00 p.m., CUSA.tv		Marshall	L 79–88	14–10 (7–5)	Don Haskins Center (4,129); El Paso, TX
February 17, 2022; 5:30 p.m., ESPN+		at Louisiana Tech	W 63–60	15–10 (8–5)	Thomas Assembly Center (2,777); Ruston, LA
February 19, 2022; 1:00 p.m., ESPN+		at Southern Miss	W 84–70	16–10 (9–5)	Reed Green Coliseum (2,861); Hattiesburg, MS
February 21, 2022; 5:00 p.m., CUSA.tv		at Middle Tennessee; Rescheduled from January 1	L 59–77	16–11 (9–6)	Murphy Center (4,211); Murfreesboro, TN
February 26, 2022; 7:00 p.m., ESPN+		UAB	L 66–69	16–12 (9–7)	Don Haskins Center (6,100); El Paso, TX
March 3, 2022; 7:00 p.m., CUSA.tv		Rice	W 70–67	17–12 (10–7)	Don Haskins Center (4,645); El Paso, TX
March 5, 2022; 1:00 p.m., ESPN+		North Texas	W 70–68	18–12 (11–7)	Don Haskins Center (5,521); El Paso, TX
Conference USA tournament
March 9, 2022; 8:00 p.m., ESPN+	(W4)	vs. (E5) Old Dominion; Second round	W 74–64	19–12	Ford Center at The Star; Frisco, TX
March 10, 2022; 8:00 p.m., Stadium	(W4)	vs. (E1) Middle Tennessee; Quarterfinals	L 59–66 ^{OT}	19–13	Ford Center at The Star; Frisco, TX
The Basketball Classic
March 19, 2022; 1:00 pm, ESPN+		Western Illinois; First Round	W 80–54	20–13	Don Haskins Center (3,500); El Paso, TX
March 22, 2022; 7:00 pm, ESPN+		Southern Utah; Second Round	L 69–82	20–14	Don Haskins Center (3,510); El Paso, TX
*Non-conference game. ^{#}Rankings from AP Poll. (#) Tournament seedings in parentheses. All times are in Mountain.

== See also ==
- 2021–22 UTEP Miners women's basketball team
