= 2021–22 Middle Tennessee Blue Raiders men's basketball team =

American college basketball season

2021–22 Middle Tennessee Blue Raiders men's basketball

C-USA East Division champions Cancún Challenge Mayan Division champions

CBI, runner-up
- Conference: Conference USA
- East Division
- Record: 26–11 (13–5 CUSA)
- Head coach: Nick McDevitt (4th season)
- Assistant coaches: Turner Battle; Sean Dixon; Wes Long
- Home arena: Murphy Center

2021–22 Conference USA men's basketball standings
	Conf.				Overall
Team	W		L	PCT	W		L	PCT
East
Middle Tennessee	13	–	5	.722	26	–	11	.703
Western Kentucky	11	–	7	.611	19	–	13	.594
Florida Atlantic	11	–	7	.611	19	–	15	.559
Charlotte	10	–	8	.556	17	–	14	.548
Old Dominion	8	–	10	.444	13	–	19	.406
FIU	5	–	13	.278	15	–	17	.469
Marshall	4	–	14	.222	12	–	21	.364
West
North Texas	16	–	2	.889	25	–	7	.781
UAB †	14	–	4	.778	27	–	8	.771
Louisiana Tech	12	–	6	.667	24	–	10	.706
UTEP	11	–	7	.611	20	–	14	.588
Rice	7	–	11	.389	16	–	17	.485
UTSA	3	–	15	.167	10	–	22	.313
Southern Miss	1	–	17	.056	7	–	26	.212
† 2022 C-USA Tournament winner

The 2021–22 Middle Tennessee Blue Raiders men's basketball team represented Middle Tennessee State University during the 2021–22 NCAA Division I men's basketball season. The team was led by fourth-year head coach Nick McDevitt, and played their home games at Murphy Center in Murfreesboro, Tennessee as members of Conference USA (C-USA).

== Previous season ==
In a season limited due to the ongoing COVID-19 pandemic, the Blue Raiders finished the 2021–22 season 5–18, 3–13 in C-USA play, to finish in sixth place in East Division. In the first round of the C-USA tournament, the Blue Raiders advanced to the second round when FIU was forced to withdraw due to positive COVID-19 tests. In the second round, they lost to North Texas.

== Offseason ==
=== Departures ===
Name	Number	Pos.	Height	Weight	Year	Hometown	Reason for departure
Jordan Davis	0	G	6' 3"	195	RS Junior	Irmo, SC	Graduate transferred to Jacksonville
Tyson Jackson	4	F	6' 9"	245	Sophomore	Fairburn, GA	Transferred to New Orleans
Jayce Johnson	13	G/F	6' 5"	210	Junior	Buffalo, NY	Transfrerred to Siena
Jo'Vontae Millner-Criss	21	F	6' 6"	200	RS Senior	Burlington, NC	Graduated
Marcus Mitchell	24	F	6' 7"	225	RS Senior	Memphis, TN	Graduate transferred
Dontrell Shuler	33	G	6' 2"	180	RS Junior	Irmo, SC	Transferred

=== Incoming transfers ===
Name	Number	Pos.	Height	Weight	Year	Hometown	Previous school
Isaiah Turner	0	F	6' 9"	215	Junior	Auburndale, FL	Odessa College
Justin Bufford	4	G	6' 7"		Sophomore	Montgomery, AL	Shelton State CC
Josh Jefferson	11	G	6' 2"	190	GS Senior	New Albany, IN	Green Bay
Camryn Weston	24	G	6' 2"		Junior	Albany, GA	Southeastern CC

=== 2021 recruiting class ===
College recruiting information
Name	Hometown	School	Height	Weight	Commit date
Teafale Lenard; SF	Branson, MO	Link Academy	6 ft 7 in (2.01 m)	170 lb (77 kg)	May 27, 2021
Teafale Lenard; SF	Recruit ratings: Scout: Rivals: 247Sports: (NR)				
Overall recruit ranking:
Note: In many cases, Scout, Rivals, 247Sports, On3, and ESPN may conflict in their listings of height and weight.; In these cases, the average was taken. ESPN grades are on a 100-point scale.; Sources: "2021 Team Ranking". Rivals.

== Roster ==
2021–22 Middle Tennessee Blue Raiders men's basketball team
Players
Coaches

Pos.	#	Name	Height	Weight	Year	Previous school	Hometown
F	0	Isaiah Turner	6 ft 9 in (2.06 m)	240 lb (109 kg)	Jr	Aubrndale HS; Odessa College	Auburndale, FL
F	1	Tyler Millin	6 ft 7 in (2.01 m)	205 lb (93 kg)	Jr	The Skill Factory	Calera, AL
F	2	DeAndre Dishman	6 ft 6 in (1.98 m)	235 lb (107 kg)	RS Sr	Bryan Station HS; Eastern Kentucky	Lexington, KY
G	3	Donovan Sims	6 ft 1 in (1.85 m)	160 lb (73 kg)	RS Sr	Blackman HS	Murfreesboro, TN
G	4	Justin Bufford	6 ft 6 in (1.98 m)	185 lb (84 kg)	So	Montgomery Catholic; Shelton State CC	Selma, AL
G	5	Eli Lawrence	6 ft 5 in (1.96 m)	185 lb (84 kg)	Jr	Washington Academy (NC)	Atlanta, GA
F	10	Elias King	6 ft 8 in (2.03 m)	200 lb (91 kg)	Jr	Lincoln Academy; Mississippi State	Atlanta, GA
G	11	Josh Jefferson	6 ft 2 in (1.88 m)	190 lb (86 kg)	RS Sr	New Albany HS; Green Bay	New Albany, IN
G	12	Teafale Jr. Lenard	6 ft 7 in (2.01 m)	175 lb (79 kg)	Fr	Link Year Prep (MO)	Snyder, TX
G	13	Jaellan White (W)	6 ft 0 in (1.83 m)	190 lb (86 kg)	RS Sr	Blackman HS; Motlow State CC	Murfreesboro, TN
G	14	Jalen Jordan	6 ft 3 in (1.91 m)	160 lb (73 kg)	RS Sr	Rockdale County HS; St. Francis Brooklyn	Conyers, GA
F	15	Christian Fussell	6 ft 10 in (2.08 m)	215 lb (98 kg)	RS So	Greenforest Christian Academy	Decatur, GA
F	23	Jared Coleman-Jones	6 ft 10 in (2.08 m)	240 lb (109 kg)	So	McEarhern HS; Northwestern	Hiram, GA
G	24	Camryn Weston	6 ft 3 in (1.91 m)	195 lb (88 kg)	Jr	Westover HS; Southeastern CC	Albany, GA

Head coach

- Nick McDevitt (UNC Asheville)

Assistant coach(es)

- Turner Battle (Buffalo)
- Sean Dixon (Presbyterian)
- Wes Long (Clemson)

Legend

- (C) Team captain
- (S) Suspended
- (I) Ineligible
- (W) Walk-on
- Injured
- Current redshirt

Roster
Last update: October 21, 2024

== Schedule and results ==
Date time, TV	Rank^{#}	Opponent^{#}	Result	Record	Site (attendance) city, state
Non-conference regular season
November 9, 2021*; 5:00 p.m.		Brescia	W 98–59	1–0	Murphy Center (2,104); Murfreesboro, TN
November 12, 2021*; 6:00 p.m.		Bethune–Cookman	W 71–51	2–0	Murphy Center (2,317); Murfreesboro, TN
November 16, 2021*; 6:00 p.m.		Winthrop	W 76–65	3–0	Murphy Center (3,212); Murfreesboro, TN
November 19, 2021*; 7:00 p.m., ESPN+		at Stephen F. Austin; Cancún Challenge campus-site game	L 74–87	3–1	William R. Johnson Coliseum (1,901); Nacogdoches, TX
November 23, 2021*; 11:30 a.m., FloHoops		vs. Rider; Cancún Challenge Mayan semifinal	W 60–54	4–1	Hard Rock Hotel Riviera (111); Cancún, Mexico
November 24, 2021*; 2:00 p.m., FloHoops		vs. Mercer; Cancún Challenge Mayan championship	W 82–58	5–1	Hard Rock Hotel Riviera (103); Cancún, Mexico
November 27, 2021*; 2:00 p.m.		Bryan College	W 96–48	6–1	Murphy Center (2,478); Murfreesboro, TN
December 1, 2021*; 6:00 p.m.		UT Martin	W 73–61	7–1	Murphy Center (2,512); Murfreesboro, TN
December 4, 2021*; 7:00 p.m., ESPN+		at Murray State	L 87–93	7–2	CFSB Center (4,114); Murray, KY
December 11, 2021*; 8:00 p.m., ESPN+		at UT Martin	W 84–75	8–2	Skyhawk Arena (1,218); Martin, TN
December 15, 2021*; 6:30 p.m., SECN+/ESPN+		at Ole Miss	L 52–62	8–3	SJB Pavilion (5,902); Oxford, MS
December 19, 2021*; 2:00 p.m.		Coastal Carolina	W 84–80	9–3	Murphy Center (2,606); Murfreesboro, TN
December 22, 2021*; 6:00 p.m., ESPN+		at Chattanooga	L 65–77	9–4	McKenzie Arena (2,730); Chattanooga, TN
Conference USA regular season
January 6, 2022; 7:00 p.m.		at Rice	L 61–65	9–5 (0–1)	Tudor Fieldhouse (500); Houston, TX
January 8, 2022; 5:00 p.m.		at North Texas	L 63–70	9–6 (0–2)	The Super Pit (3,280); Denton, TX
January 13, 2022; 6:00 p.m., ESPN+		Florida Atlantic	W 70–57	10–6 (1–2)	Murphy Center (2,515); Murfreesboro, TN
January 15, 2022; 5:00 p.m., ESPN+		FIU	W 50–39	11–6 (2–2)	Murphy Center (3,122); Murfreesboro, TN
January 22, 2022; 1:00 p.m., ESPN+		Southern Miss	W 74–60	12–6 (3–2)	Murphy Center (3,512); Murfreesboro, TN
January 27, 2022; 6:00 p.m., ESPN+		at Marshall	W 81–79	13–6 (4–2)	Cam Henderson Center (3,864); Huntington, WV
January 29, 2022; 2:00 p.m., ESPN+		at Western Kentucky	W 93–85	14–6 (5–2)	E. A. Diddle Arena (4,435); Bowling Green, KY
February 5, 2022; 3:00 p.m., ESPN+		at UAB	L 75–97	14–7 (5–3)	Bartow Arena (4,273); Birmingham, AL
February 7, 2022; 6:00 p.m.		UTSA; Rescheduled from December 30	W 84–75	15–7 (6–3)	Murphy Center (2,802); Murfreesboro, TN
February 10, 2022; 6:00 p.m., ESPN+		Old Dominion	W 63–48	16–7 (7–3)	Murphy Center (3,645); Murfreesboro, TN
February 13, 2022; 2:00 p.m., ESPN+		Charlotte	W 78–63	17–7 (8–3)	Murphy Center (3,685); Murfreesboro, TN
February 17, 2022; 6:00 p.m., Stadium		at FIU	W 71–65	18–7 (9–3)	Ocean Bank Convocation Center (2,783); Miami, FL
February 19, 2022; 3:00 p.m., CUSA.tv		at Florida Atlantic	W 87–79	19–7 (10–3)	FAU Arena (1,977); Boca Raton, FL
February 21, 2022; 6:00 p.m.		UTEP; Rescheduled from January 1	W 77–59	20–7 (11–3)	Murphy Center (4,211); Murfreesboro, TN
February 24, 2022; 6:00 p.m., ESPN+		Marshall	W 74–65	21–7 (12–3)	Murphy Center (4,505); Murfreesboro, TN
February 26, 2022; 6:00 p.m., ESPN+		Western Kentucky	W 69–52	22–7 (13–3)	Murphy Center (6,192); Murfreesboro, TN
March 2, 2022; 6:00 p.m., ESPN+		at Charlotte	L 56–60	22–8 (13–4)	Dale F. Halton Arena (3,070); Charlotte, NC
March 5, 2022; 1:00 p.m., ESPN+		at Old Dominion	L 64–68	22–9 (13–5)	Chartway Arena (5,230); Norfolk, VA
Conference USA tournament
March 10, 2022; 5:30 p.m., Stadium	(E1)	vs. (W4) UTEP; Quarterfinals	W 66–59 ^{OT}	23–9	Ford Center at The Star; Frisco, TX
March 11, 2022; 2:00 p.m., CBSSN	(E1)	vs. (W2) UAB; Semifinals	L 98–102 ^{3OT}	23–10	Ford Center at The Star; Frisco, TX
CBI
March 19, 2022; 4:00 pm, FloHoops	(2)	vs. (15) California Baptist; First round	W 64–58	24–10	Ocean Center (578); Daytona Beach, FL
March 21, 2022; 6:00 pm, FloHoops	(2)	vs. (10) Boston University; Quarterfinals	W 76–46	25–10	Ocean Center (706); Daytona Beach, FL
March 22, 2022; 8:30 pm, ESPN2	(2)	vs. (6) Abilene Christian; Semifinals	W 85–69	26–10	Ocean Center (633); Daytona Beach, FL
March 23, 2022; 5:00 pm, ESPN2	(2)	vs. (9) UNC Wilmington; Championship	L 90–96 ^{2OT}	26–11	Ocean Center (624); Daytona Beach, FL
*Non-conference game. ^{#}Rankings from AP poll. (#) Tournament seedings in parentheses. All times are in Central.
