= 21st Century Charter School of Gary =

Location
- 556 Washington Street; 724 Washington Street; 1440 E 35th Ave; Gary, Indiana 46402; 46409; United States; 41°36′02.5″N 87°20′19.6″W

Information
- Type: Charter
- Established: 2005
- Principal: Elementary-Nicole McIntosh Middle School-Nikki Dates High School-Othinel Mahone
- Faculty: 115.00 (on an FTE basis)
- Enrollment: 1,337 (2022-23)
- Student to teacher ratio: 21.63
- Affiliations: GEO Foundation
- Website: www.21cchartergary.org

21st Century Charter School of Gary is a public K-12 charter school in Gary, Indiana, United States. It is authorized by and accountable to Ball State University.

== History ==
The 21st Century Charter School of Gary was established in 2005, originally serving grades 7–9. The initial curriculum description said, "Spanish language classes for all students will be offered, and character development will be taught."

In 2012, all 19 seniors graduated and were college-bound.

In 2019, in order to expand due to so many new high school students coming in, 21st Century bought 2 former Ivy Tech buildings sitting at 1440 E 35th Ave in Gary.

The original school building had a capacity of 400 students, but by 2013 it had become overcrowded with more than 650 students. A new two-story $6.5 million building with 50,000 square feet was opened in September 2013 to meet the needs of grades seven through twelve; children in grades kindergarten through six remained in the original building.

In 2015, the school celebrated graduating honor roll students, according to the Times of Muenster, Indiana, which described the school's affiliation with Ivy Tech Community College:

The school encourages its high school students to challenge themselves through college classes at Ivy Tech Community College, with 21st Century paying for tuition, books and transportation for all college classes. So far, six 21st Century Charter school students have earned their associate degree from Ivy Tech through 21st Century Charter School, allowing them to save time and money.

In 2017, CNN featured a student who was receiving a baccalaureate degree from Purdue University before her high school graduation from 21st Century Charter School.

In July 2020, Ball State University gave a notice of probation to the 21st Century Charter School at Gary, questioning, "...why 21st Century — a school known to tout its early college program, providing students with opportunities to earn career certifications and college credits while in high school — was scoring below state averages in elementary and middle school reading comprehension and math."

During the 2020–21 school year, the school served 934 students in grades K–12. 21st Century Charter School's enrollment had increased by 23% over the five preceding school years.

As of 2022, EdRater published the school's cumulative test scores:

21st Century Charter School Of Gary placed in the lower 50% of all schools in Indiana for cumulative test scores (math proficiency is lower 50%, and reading proficiency is lower 50%) for the 2020-21 school year. The percentage of learners achieving proficiency in math is 25% (which is lower than the Indiana state average of 54%) for the 2020-21 school year. The percentage of learners achieving proficiency in reading/language arts is 42% (which is lower than the Indiana state average of 62%) for the 2020-21 school year.

== Notable alumni ==
- Eugene German (2016), basketball player in the Israeli Basketball Premier League
- Johnell Davis (2020), basketball player who last played for the Osceola Magic of the NBA G League
