= Carlos Mugabo =

American basketball player (born 1987)

Carlos Monroe (born May 5, 1987, in Philadelphia, United States, but listed by Rwanda as born Carlos Mugabo on August 12, 1986, in Nyarugenge) is an American basketball player who was part of the Rwanda national basketball team at the 2009 FIBA Africa Championship. He played for the Florida Atlantic Owls men's basketball from 2005 to 2009.

Mugabo was a late addition to the Rwandan team for the 2009 FIBA Africa Championship after two Rwandan players pulled out of the tournament three weeks before the scheduled opener. Nevertheless, he averaged 10.6 PPG, 5.8 RPG, and 2.0 SPG to help lead the Rwandans to a 9th-place finish and their best performance to date at the African Championships.
