= 2021–22 Western Kentucky Hilltoppers basketball team =

American college basketball season

2021–22 Western Kentucky Hilltoppers basketball
- Conference: Conference USA
- East Division
- Record: 19–13 (11–7 C-USA)
- Head coach: Rick Stansbury (6th season)
- Associate head coach: Phil Cunningham
- Assistant coaches: Hennssy Auriantal; Marcus Grant
- Home arena: E. A. Diddle Arena

2021–22 Conference USA men's basketball standings
	Conf.				Overall
Team	W		L	PCT	W		L	PCT
East
Middle Tennessee	13	–	5	.722	26	–	11	.703
Western Kentucky	11	–	7	.611	19	–	13	.594
Florida Atlantic	11	–	7	.611	19	–	15	.559
Charlotte	10	–	8	.556	17	–	14	.548
Old Dominion	8	–	10	.444	13	–	19	.406
FIU	5	–	13	.278	15	–	17	.469
Marshall	4	–	14	.222	12	–	21	.364
West
North Texas	16	–	2	.889	25	–	7	.781
UAB †	14	–	4	.778	27	–	8	.771
Louisiana Tech	12	–	6	.667	24	–	10	.706
UTEP	11	–	7	.611	20	–	14	.588
Rice	7	–	11	.389	16	–	17	.485
UTSA	3	–	15	.167	10	–	22	.313
Southern Miss	1	–	17	.056	7	–	26	.212
† 2022 C-USA Tournament winner

The 2021–22 Western Kentucky Hilltoppers men's basketball team represented Western Kentucky University during the 2021–22 NCAA Division I men's basketball season. The Hilltoppers were led by sixth-year head coach Rick Stansbury and played their home games at E. A. Diddle Arena in Bowling Green, Kentucky as eighth-year members of Conference USA (C-USA).

== Previous season ==
The Hilltoppers finished the 2021–22 season 21–8, 11–3 in C-USA play, to win the West Division. They defeated UTSA and UAB in the quarterfinals and semifinals, respectively, in the C-USA tournament before losing to North Texas in the championship. They received a bid to the National Invitation Tournament, where they defeated Saint Mary's losing to C-USA member Louisiana Tech in the quarterfinals.

== Offseason ==
=== Departures ===
Name	Number	Pos.	Height	Weight	Year	Hometown	Reason for departure
Kylen Milton	1	G	6'4"	190	Freshman	Monticello, AR	Transferred to Arkansas–Pine Bluff
Kevin Osawe	2	F	6'6"	205	Junior	Toronto, ON	Graduate transferred to Little Rock
Jordan Rawls	3	G	6'1"	180	Sophomore	Chattanooga, TN	Transferred to Georgia State
Taveion Hollingsworth	11	G	6'2"	165	Senior	Lexington, KY	Graduated/went undrafted in 2021 NBA draft
Jackson Harlan	12	G	6'3"	190	Sophomore	Albany, KY	Walk-on; left the team for personal reasons
Patrick Murphy	15	G	6'5"	180	RS Senior	Franklin, TN	Walk-on; left the team for personal reasons
Zion Harmon	15	G	5'11"	170	Freshman	Benton, KY	Walk-on; left the team for personal reasons
Kenny Cooper	21	G	6'0"	190	RS Senior	Nashville, TN	Graduate transferred to Tennessee State
Carson Williams	22	F	6'5"	240	RS Senior	Owenton, KY	Graduated
Charles Bassey	23	C	6'11"	235	Junior	Lagos, Nigeria	Declared for 2021 NBA draft

=== Incoming transfers ===
Name	Number	Pos.	Height	Weight	Year	Hometown	Previous school
Darrius Miles	0	C	6'10"		Sophomore	Dallas, TX	Odessa College
Jaylen Butz	1	F	6'9"	224	GS Senior	Fort Wayne, IN	DePaul
Keith Williams	2	G	6'5"	215	GS Senior	Brooklyn, New York	Cincinnati
Jairus Hamilton	3	F	6'8"	235	Senior	Charlotte, NC	Maryland
Sherman Brashear	13	G	6'3"		Sophomore	Dallas, TX	Panola College
Jamarion Sharp	33	F/C	7'3"	238	Junior	Hopkinsville, KY	John A. Logan College

=== 2021 recruiting class ===
College recruiting information
Name	Hometown	School	Height	Weight	Commit date
Zion Harmon #9 PG	Benton, KY	Marshall County High School	5 ft 10 in (1.78 m)	175 lb (79 kg)	Mar 24, 2020
Zion Harmon #9 PG	Recruit ratings: Scout: Rivals: 247Sports: ESPN: (85)				
Elijah Hughey; SG	Lancaster, TX	Lancaster High School	6 ft 5 in (1.96 m)	195 lb (88 kg)	Sep 28, 2020
Elijah Hughey; SG	Recruit ratings: Scout: Rivals: (NR)				
Overall recruit ranking:
Note: In many cases, Scout, Rivals, 247Sports, On3, and ESPN may conflict in their listings of height and weight.; In these cases, the average was taken. ESPN grades are on a 100-point scale.; Sources: "2021 Team Ranking". Rivals.

== Roster ==
2021–22 WKU Hilltoppers men's basketball team
Players
Coaches

Pos.	#	Name	Height	Weight	Year	Previous school	Hometown
C	0	Darrius Miles	6 ft 10 in (2.08 m)	295 lb (134 kg)	So	Faith Family Academy; Odessa College	Oak Cliff, TX
F	1	Jaylen Butz	6 ft 9 in (2.06 m)	230 lb (104 kg)	RS Sr	North Side HS; DePaul	Fort Wayne, IN
F	3	Jairus Hamilton	6 ft 8 in (2.03 m)	230 lb (104 kg)	Sr	Cannon School; Maryland	Charlotte, NC
G	4	Josh Anderson	6 ft 6 in (1.98 m)	190 lb (86 kg)	GS	Madison Preparatory Academy	Baton Rouge, LA
G	5	Noah Stansbury (W)	6 ft 0 in (1.83 m)	170 lb (77 kg)	RS Fr	Greenwood HS	Bowling Green, KY
G	10	Elijah Hughey	6 ft 4 in (1.93 m)	200 lb (91 kg)	Fr	Lancaster HS	Dallas, TX
G	12	Tyler Olden (W)	5 ft 11 in (1.8 m)	210 lb (95 kg)	Fr	Hillcrest Prep	Scottsdale, AZ
G	13	Sherman Brashear	6 ft 5 in (1.96 m)	180 lb (82 kg)	So	Rockwall HS; Panola College	Dallas, TX
G	14	Luke Frampton	6 ft 5 in (1.96 m)	205 lb (93 kg)	RS Sr	Poca HS; Davidson	Poca, WV
G	20	Dayvion McKnight	6 ft 1 in (1.85 m)	195 lb (88 kg)	So	Collins HS	Shelbyville, KY
F	32	Bailey Conrad	6 ft 7 in (2.01 m)	220 lb (100 kg)	So	Christian Academy of Indiana	Corydon, IN
C	33	Jamarion Sharp	7 ft 5 in (2.26 m)	235 lb (107 kg)	Jr	Hopkinsville HS; John A. Logan College	Hopkinsville, KY
F	50	Isaiah Cozart	6 ft 7 in (2.01 m)	240 lb (109 kg)	Jr	Madison Central HS	Richmond, KY
G	55	Camron Justice	6 ft 3 in (1.91 m)	185 lb (84 kg)	GS	Knott County Central HS; IUPUI	Hindman, KY

Head coach

- Rick Stansbury (Campbellsville)

Assistant coach(es)

- Phil Cunningham (Campbellsville)
- Hennssy Auriantal (Wisconsin)
- Marcus Grant (Mississippi State)

Legend

- (C) Team captain
- (S) Suspended
- (I) Ineligible
- (W) Walk-on
- Injured
- Current redshirt

Roster
Last update: 2024-05-08

== Schedule ==
Date time, TV	Rank^{#}	Opponent^{#}	Result	Record	High points	High rebounds	High assists	Site (attendance) city, state
Exhibition
November 1, 2021*; 7:00 p.m.		Campbellsville	W 82–61		19 – Hamilton	14 – Hamilton	4 – tied	E. A. Diddle Arena (3,222); Bowling Green, KY
November 5, 2021*; 7:00 p.m.		Cumberlands	W 88–59		22 – Hamilton	11 – Hamilton	11 – McKnight	E. A. Diddle Arena (3,425); Bowling Green, KY
Non-conference Regular season
November 9, 2021*; 7:00 p.m., ESPN+/WKU PBS		Alabama State	W 79–74	1–0	21 – Hamilton	8 – Sharp	6 – McKnight	E. A. Diddle Arena (4,023); Bowling Green, KY
November 12, 2021*; 5:30 p.m., ESPNU		vs. Minnesota; Asheville Championship semifinals	L 69–73	1–1	34 – McKnight	9 – McKnight	4 – McKnight	Harrah's Cherokee Center; Asheville, NC
November 14, 2021*; 4:00 p.m., ESPNU		vs. South Carolina; Asheville Championship consolation	L 64–75	1–2	16 – Anderson	6 – tied	5 – McKnight	Harrah's Cherokee Center; Asheville, NC
November 19, 2021*; 7:00 p.m., ESPN+		at No. 11 Memphis	L 62–74	1–3	18 – Justice	8 – McKnight	4 – McKnight	FedExForum (13,375); Memphis, TN
November 24, 2021*; 4:00 p.m., ESPN+		Alabama A&M	W 88-62	2–3	18 – Brashear	12 – Sharp	9 – Anderson	E. A. Diddle Arena (3,152); Bowling Green, KY
November 27, 2021*; 12:00 p.m., ESPN+/WKU PBS		UT Martin	W 81-66	3–3	24 – Hamilton	11 – Hamilton	6 – McKnight	E. A. Diddle Arena (2,927); Bowling Green, KY
November 30, 2021*; 7:00 p.m., ESPN3/WKU PBS		Rhodes College	W 105–35	4–3	24 – Hamilton	8 – McKnight	10 – McKnight	E. A. Diddle Arena (2,737); Bowling Green, KY
December 4, 2021*; 6:00 p.m., ESPN+/WKU PBS		Eastern Kentucky	W 85–80	5–3	22 – McKnight	14 – Sharp	6 – Justice	E. A. Diddle Arena (4,249); Bowling Green, KY
December 8, 2021*; 7:00 p.m., ESPN+		Buffalo	L 67–77	5–4	18 – McKnight	8 – Sharp	4 – McKnight	E. A. Diddle Arena (3,689); Bowling Green, KY
December 11, 2021*; 7:30 p.m., ESPN+		vs. Ole Miss; Holiday Hoopsgiving	W 71–48	6–4	16 – Sharp	12 – Hamilton	11 – McKnight	State Farm Arena (6,157); Atlanta, GA
December 14, 2021*; 7:00 p.m., ESPN+/WKU PBS		Centre College	W 90–52	7–4	18 – Anderson	11 – Hamilton	10 – McKnight	E. A. Diddle Arena (3,240); Bowling Green, KY
December 18, 2021*; 2:00 p.m., CBS		Louisville	W 82–72	8–4	25 – Justice	10 – Anderson	9 – McKnight	E. A. Diddle Arena (7,053); Bowling Green, KY
December 22, 2021*; 5:00 p.m., ESPN		at No. 20 Kentucky	L 60–95	8–5	18 – Anderson	8 – McKnight	4 – McKnight	Rupp Arena (20,221); Lexington, KY
Conference USA regular season
January 1, 2022; 1:00 p.m., CBSSN		at Louisiana Tech	L 73–74	8–6 (0–1)	22 – Justice	7 – tied	4 – McKnight	Thomas Assembly Center (2,348); Ruston, LA
January 8, 2022; 2:00 p.m., ESPN+		FIU	W 84–71	9–6 (1–1)	16 – Anderson	8 – Sharp	8 – McKnight	E. A. Diddle Arena (4,411); Bowling Green, KY
January 13, 2022; 8:00 p.m., CBSSN		Rice	W 80–66	10–6 (2–1)	22 – Hamilton	10 – Hamilton	12 – McKnight	E. A. Diddle Arena (2,933); Bowling Green, KY
January 15, 2022; 3:00 p.m., Stadium/WKU PBS		North Texas	L 60–65	10–7 (2–2)	23 – McKnight	7 – tied	5 – McKnight	E. A. Diddle Arena (4,012); Bowling Green, KY
January 20, 2022; 6:00 p.m., CBSSN		at Florida Atlantic	L 69–78	10–8 (2–3)	22 – McKnight	9 – McKnight	4 – McKnight	FAU Arena (1,305); Boca Raton, FL
January 22, 2022; 6:00 p.m., ESPN+		at FIU	L 83–86	10–9 (2–4)	23 – Anderson	6 – Sharp	6 – McKnight	Ocean Bank Convocation Center (2,712); Miami, FL
January 27, 2022; 8:00 p.m., CBSSN		UAB	L 65–68	10–10 (2–5)	16 – Anderson	6 – Anderson	5 – Justice	E. A. Diddle Arena (4,136); Bowling Green, KY
January 29, 2022; 2:00 p.m., ESPN+/WKU PBS		Middle Tennessee	L 85–93	10–11 (2–6)	24 – McKnight	7 – Hamilton	10 – McKnight	E. A. Diddle Arena (4,435); Bowling Green, KY
February 3, 2022; 6:00 p.m., ESPN+		at Charlotte	W 78–59	11–11 (3–6)	22 – Justice	8 – Anderson	5 – McKnight	Dale F. Halton Arena (3,024); Charlotte, NC
February 5, 2022; 6:00 p.m., ESPN+		at Old Dominion	W 77–60	12–11 (4–6)	18 – Justice	8 – Anderson	6 – McKnight	Chartway Arena (5,914); Norfolk, VA
February 10, 2022; 7:00 p.m., ESPN+		Florida Atlantic	W 76–69	13–11 (5–6)	19 – Justice	9 – tied	4 – tied	E. A. Diddle Arena (3,547); Bowling Green, KY
February 12, 2022; 3:00 p.m., CUSA.tv		at UTSA	W 71-65	14–11 (6–6)	18 – tied	12 – Sharp	6 – McKnight	Convocation Center (1,123); San Antonio, TX
February 14, 2022; 7:00 p.m., ESPN+		at Southern Miss; Rescheduled from December 30	W 87–77	15–11 (7–6)	26 – McKnight	9 – Sharp	5 – McKnight	Reed Green Coliseum (2,726); Hattiesburg, MS
February 17, 2022; 7:00 p.m., CBSSN		Charlotte	W 77–67	16–11 (8–6)	22 – McKnight	7 – Hamilton	7 – Justice	E. A. Diddle Arena (3,421); Bowling Green, KY
February 19, 2022; 6:00 p.m., ESPN+		Old Dominion	W 73–64	17–11 (9–6)	23 – McKnight	10 – Sharp	3 – Justice	E. A. Diddle Arena (5,015); Bowling Green, KY
February 26, 2022; 6:00 p.m., ESPN+		at Middle Tennessee	L 52–69	17–12 (9–7)	13 – McKnight	11 – Sharp	5 – Justice	Murphy Center (6,192); Murfreesboro, TN
March 2, 2022; 6:00 p.m., ESPNU		at Marshall	W 86–72	18–12 (10–7)	27 – Justice	11 – Sharp	4 – Justice	Cam Henderson Center (4,963); Huntington, WV
March 5, 2022; 2:00 p.m., ESPN+		Marshall	W 78–69	19–12 (11–7)	16 – tied	12 – Sharp	4 – tied	E. A. Diddle Arena (6,098); Bowling Green, KY
Conference USA tournament
March 10, 2022; 8:00 p.m., Stadium	(E2)	vs. (W3) Louisiana Tech; Quarterfinals	L 57–59	19–13	20 – McKnight	10 – Sharp	1 – tied	Ford Center at The Star; Frisco, TX
*Non-conference game. ^{#}Rankings from AP poll. (#) Tournament seedings in parentheses. All times are in Central.
