= 2021–22 North Texas Mean Green men's basketball team =

American college basketball season

2021–22 North Texas Mean Green men's basketball
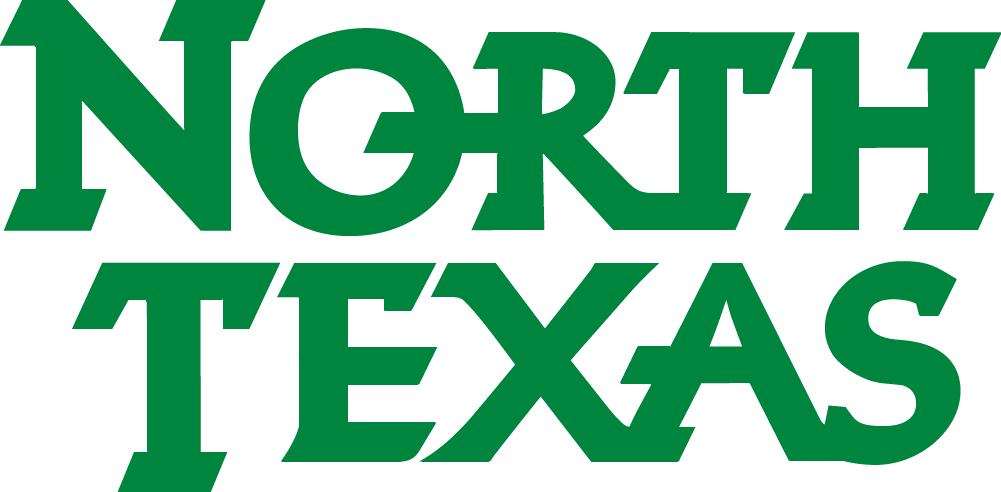

Conference USA regular season and West Division champions

NIT, Second Round
- Conference: Conference USA
- West Division
- Record: 25–7 (16–2 C-USA)
- Head coach: Grant McCasland (5th season)
- Assistant coaches: Ross Hodge; Jareem Dowling; Matt Braeuer
- Home arena: UNT Coliseum

2021–22 Conference USA men's basketball standings
	Conf.				Overall
Team	W		L	PCT	W		L	PCT
East
Middle Tennessee	13	–	5	.722	26	–	11	.703
Western Kentucky	11	–	7	.611	19	–	13	.594
Florida Atlantic	11	–	7	.611	19	–	15	.559
Charlotte	10	–	8	.556	17	–	14	.548
Old Dominion	8	–	10	.444	13	–	19	.406
FIU	5	–	13	.278	15	–	17	.469
Marshall	4	–	14	.222	12	–	21	.364
West
North Texas	16	–	2	.889	25	–	7	.781
UAB †	14	–	4	.778	27	–	8	.771
Louisiana Tech	12	–	6	.667	24	–	10	.706
UTEP	11	–	7	.611	20	–	14	.588
Rice	7	–	11	.389	16	–	17	.485
UTSA	3	–	15	.167	10	–	22	.313
Southern Miss	1	–	17	.056	7	–	26	.212
† 2022 C-USA Tournament winner

The 2021–22 North Texas Mean Green men's basketball team represented the University of North Texas during the 2021–22 NCAA Division I men's basketball season. The team was led by fifth-year head coach Grant McCasland, and played their home games at UNT Coliseum in Denton, Texas as a member of the West division of Conference USA. They finished the season 25-7, 16-2 in C-USA Play to finish as regular season champions. They defeated Rice in the quarterfinals of the C-USA tournament before losing in the semifinals to Louisiana Tech. As a No. 1 seed who didn’t win their conference tournament, they received an automatic bid to the National Invitation Tournament where they defeated Texas State in the first round before losing in the second round to Virginia.

== Previous season ==
In a season limited due to the ongoing COVID-19 pandemic, the Mean Green finished the 2020–21 season 18–10, 9–5 to finish in third place in the division. They defeated Middle Tennessee, Old Dominion, Louisiana Tech, and Western Kentucky to win the C-USA tournament championship. As a result, the received the conference's automatic bid to the NCAA tournament as the No. 13 seed in the South region. There they upset No. 4-seeded Purdue in the first round before losing to No. 5-seeded Villanova in the second round.

== Offseason ==
=== Departures ===
Name	Number	Pos.	Height	Weight	Year	Hometown	Reason for departure
James Reese	0	G	6'4"	167	Senior	Eastover, SC	Graduate transferred to South Carolina
Keith Barnes	2	G	6'4"	200	RS Freshman	St. Louis, MO	Walk-on; left the team for personal reasons
Javion Hamlet	3	G	6'4"	193	RS Senior	Memphis, TN	Graduated/went undrafted in 2021 NBA draft
Jalen Jackson	4	G	5'11"	177	Sophomore	San Antonio, TX	Transferred to Texas A&M–Corpus Christi
Larry Wise	22	G	6'5"	194	RS Sophomore	Waxachacie, TX	Transferred to West Texas A&M
Mykell Robinson	23	G	6'7"	205	Freshman	Houston, TX	Transferred to Dodge City CC
Zachary Simmons	24	F	6'10"	239	Senior	Abilene, TX	Graduated
Terence Lewis II	34	F	6'7"	208	RS Junior	Upper Marlboro, MD	Graduate transferred to Jackson State

=== Incoming transfers ===
Name	Number	Pos.	Height	Weight	Year	Hometown	Previous School
Rasheed Browne	0	G	6'2"	175	Senior	Philadelphia, PA	Texas A&M–Corpus Christi
Tylor Perry	5	G	5'11"	183	Junior	Fort Coffee, OK	Coffeyville CC
Bryce Zephir	12	G	6'4"	190	Sophomore	Carson, CA	Chipola College
Hameir Wright	44	F	6'9"	220	GS Senior	Albany, NY	Washington

=== Recruiting class of 2021 ===
College recruiting information
Name	Hometown	School	Height	Weight	Commit date
Aaron Scott; SF	Legacy the School of Sport Sciences	Spring, TX	6 ft 6 in (1.98 m)	175 lb (79 kg)	Mar 22, 2021
Aaron Scott; SF	Recruit ratings: Rivals:				
Chrisdon Morgan; C	DeSoto High School	DeSoto, TX	6 ft 8 in (2.03 m)	225 lb (102 kg)	Sep 25, 2020
Chrisdon Morgan; C	Recruit ratings: Rivals: 247Sports:				
Matthew Stone; SF	Kingfisher High School	DeSoto, TX	6 ft 4 in (1.93 m)	180 lb (82 kg)	Sep 15, 2020
Matthew Stone; SF	Recruit ratings: Rivals: 247Sports:				
Overall recruit ranking:
Note: In many cases, Scout, Rivals, 247Sports, On3, and ESPN may conflict in their listings of height and weight.; In these cases, the average was taken. ESPN grades are on a 100-point scale.; Sources: "2021 Team Ranking". Rivals.

== Roster ==
2021–22 North Texas Mean Green men's basketball team
Players
Coaches

Pos.	#	Name	Height	Weight	Year	Previous school	Hometown
G	0	Rasheed Browne	6 ft 2 in (1.88 m)	182 lb (83 kg)	Sr	Neumann HS; Texas A&M–Corpus Christi	Philadelphia, PA
G	1	Mardrez McBride	6 ft 2 in (1.88 m)	180 lb (82 kg)	Sr	Butler HS; USC Salkehatchie	Augusta, GA
G	2	Aaron Scott	6 ft 7 in (2.01 m)	190 lb (86 kg)	Fr	Legacy the School of Sport Sciences	Spring, TX
F	4	Thomas Bell	6 ft 6 in (1.98 m)	205 lb (93 kg)	RS Sr	Cahokia HS; Kaskaskia	East St. Louis, IL
G	5	Tylor Perry	5 ft 11 in (1.8 m)	182 lb (83 kg)	Jr	Spiro HS; Coffeyville CC	Fort Coffee, OK
F	10	Jahmiah Simmons	6 ft 4 in (1.93 m)	220 lb (100 kg)	RS Sr	Pace HS; Arkansas State	St. Thomas, USVI
G	11	JJ Murray (W)	6 ft 1 in (1.85 m)	179 lb (81 kg)	RS Sr	Rowlett HS; Eastfield	Rowlett, TX
G	12	Bryce Zephir	6 ft 2 in (1.88 m)	200 lb (91 kg)	So	Santa Monica HS; Chipola College	Carson, CA
G	13	Arsh Mattu (W)	6 ft 3 in (1.91 m)	192 lb (87 kg)	Fr	Lewisville HS	Lewisville, TX
G	14	Dylan McKeon (W)	6 ft 3 in (1.91 m)	180 lb (82 kg)	Fr	Sachse HS	Garland, TX
G	15	Rubin Jones	6 ft 5 in (1.96 m)	190 lb (86 kg)	So	Yates HS	Houston, TX
F	21	Chris Morgan	6 ft 8 in (2.03 m)	243 lb (110 kg)	Fr	Lancaster HS	DeSoto, TX
G	23	Matthew Stone	6 ft 4 in (1.93 m)	205 lb (93 kg)	Fr	Kingfisher HS	Kingsfisher, OK
F	33	Abou Ousmane	6 ft 10 in (2.08 m)	230 lb (104 kg)	So	Scotland Performance Institute	Brooklyn, NY
F	44	Hameir Wright	6 ft 8 in (2.03 m)	208 lb (94 kg)	RS Sr	Albany Academy; Washington	Albany, NY

Head coach

- Grant McCasland (Baylor)

Assistant coach(es)

- Ross Hodge (East Texas A&M)
- Jareem Dowling (Maryland Eastern Shore)
- Matt Braeuer (Wichita State)

Legend

- (C) Team captain
- (S) Suspended
- (I) Ineligible
- (W) Walk-on
- Injured
- Current redshirt

Roster

== Schedule and results ==
Date time, TV	Rank^{#}	Opponent^{#}	Result	Record	Site (attendance) city, state
Exhibition
October 30, 2021*; 4:00 p.m.		at No. 16 Arkansas; Charity Exhibition	L 60–68		Bud Walton Arena (19,200); Fayetteville, AR
Non-conference regular season
November 9, 2021*; 7:30 p.m., YouTube		Oklahoma Christian	W 84–53	1–0	The Super Pit (3,758); Denton, TX
November 15, 2021*; 7:00 p.m., ESPN+		Buffalo	L 66–69	1–1	The Super Pit (3,058); Denton, TX
November 18, 2021*; 7:00 p.m., YouTube		UT Arlington	W 64–36	2–1	The Super Pit (3,211); Denton, TX
November 25, 2021*; 2:30 p.m., ESPN		vs. No. 4 Kansas; ESPN Events Invitational quarterfinals	L 59–71	2–2	HP Field House (3,514); Kissimmee, FL
November 26, 2021*; 10:00 a.m., ESPN2		vs. Miami (FL); ESPN Events Invitational Consolation round	L 63–69	2–3	HP Field House (3,859); Kissimmee, FL
November 28, 2021*; 9:30 a.m., ESPNU		vs. Drake; ESPN Events Invitational	W 57–54	3–3	HP Field House (3,252); Kissimmee, FL
December 4, 2021*; 3:00 p.m.		LSU–Shreveport	W 73–35	4–3	The Super Pit (2,740); Denton, TX
December 11, 2021*; 3:30 p.m., FloSports		vs. UMass; Basketball Hall of Fame Classic	W 66–57	5–3	Dickies Arena; Fort Worth, TX
December 14, 2021*; 7:00 p.m., ESPN+		San Houston State	W 65–55	6–3	The Super Pit; Denton, TX
December 18, 2021*; 3:00 p.m., ESPN+		at Wichita State	W 62–52	7–3	Charles Koch Arena (8,277); Wichita, KS
December 21, 2021*; 5:30 p.m., ESPN+		vs. Tulsa; Compete 4 Cause Classic	Canceled		Paycom Center; Oklahoma City, OK
Conference USA regular season
January 1, 2022; 5:00 p.m., ESPN+/YouTube		Rice	W 75–43	8–3 (1–0)	The Super Pit (2,409); Denton, TX
January 6, 2022; 7:00 p.m., CBSSN		UAB	L 63–69	8–4 (1–1)	The Super Pit (3,207); Denton, TX
January 8, 2022; 5:00 p.m., YouTube		Middle Tennessee	W 70–63	9–4 (2–1)	The Super Pit (3,280); Denton, TX
January 13, 2022; 6:00 p.m., ESPN+		at Marshall	W 69–65	10–4 (3–1)	Cam Henderson Center (3,818); Huntington, WV
January 15, 2022; 3:00 p.m., Stadium		at Western Kentucky	W 65–60	11–4 (4–1)	E. A. Diddle Arena (4,012); Bowling Green, KY
January 20, 2022; 6:00 p.m., ESPNU		Charlotte	W 65–51	12–4 (5–1)	The Super Pit (3,759); Denton, TX
January 22, 2022; 5:00 p.m., ESPN+		Old Dominion	W 69–56	13–4 (6–1)	The Super Pit (3,475); Denton, TX
January 27, 2022; 7:00 p.m., ESPN+		at Southern Miss	W 63–54	14–4 (7–1)	Reed Green Coliseum (3,205); Hattiesburg, MS
January 29, 2022; 3:00 p.m., Stadium		at Louisiana Tech	W 63–62	15–4 (8–1)	Thomas Assembly Center (4,002); Ruston, LA
February 5, 2022; 5:00 p.m., ESPN+		UTSA	W 69–45	16–4 (9–1)	The Super Pit (4,227); Denton, TX
February 7, 2022; 7:00 p.m., ESPN+		UTEP; Rescheduled from February 3	W 66–58	17–4 (10–1)	The Super Pit (3,813); Denton, TX
February 12, 2022; 2:00 p.m., CUSA.TV		at Rice	W 67–44	18–4 (11–1)	Tudor Fieldhouse (2,102); Houston, TX
February 17, 2022; 6:00 p.m., ESPN+		at Florida Atlantic	W 54–51	19–4 (12–1)	FAU Arena (1,774); Boca Raton, FL
February 19, 2022; 3:00 p.m., Stadium		at UAB	W 58–57	20–4 (13–1)	Bartow Arena (4,721); Birmingham, AL
February 24, 2022; 7:00 p.m., ESPN+		Southern Miss	W 85–61	21–4 (14–1)	The Super Pit (4,150); Denton, TX
February 26, 2022; 3:00 p.m., Stadium		Louisiana Tech	W 56–49	22–4 (15–1)	The Super Pit (8,522); Denton, TX
March 3, 2022; 7:00 p.m., ESPN+		at UTSA	W 59–48	23–4 (16–1)	Conovcation Center (864); San Antonio, TX
March 5, 2022; 2:00 p.m., ESPN+		at UTEP	L 68–70	23–5 (16–2)	Don Haskins Center (5,521); El Paso, TX
Conference USA tournament
March 10, 2022; 5:30 p.m., Stadium	(W1)	vs. (W5) Rice; Quarterfinals	W 68–50	24–5	Ford Center at The Star; Frisco, TX
March 11, 2022; 11:30 a.m., CBSSN	(W1)	vs. (W3) Louisiana Tech; Semifinals	L 36–42	24–6	Ford Center at The Star; Frisco, TX
NIT tournament
March 15, 2022; 7:00 p.m., ESPN+	(2)	Texas State; First Round – Oklahoma Bracket	W 67–63 ^{OT}	25–6	The Super Pit (3,386); Denton, TX
March 20, 2022; 5:00 p.m., ESPN+	(2)	Virginia; Second Round – Oklahoma Bracket	L 69–71 ^{OT}	25–7	The Super Pit (4,866); Denton, TX
*Non-conference game. ^{#}Rankings from AP Poll. (#) Tournament seedings in parentheses. All times are in Central.

== See also ==
- 2021–22 North Texas Mean Green women's basketball team
