= Vladislav Goldin =

Russian basketball player (born 2001)

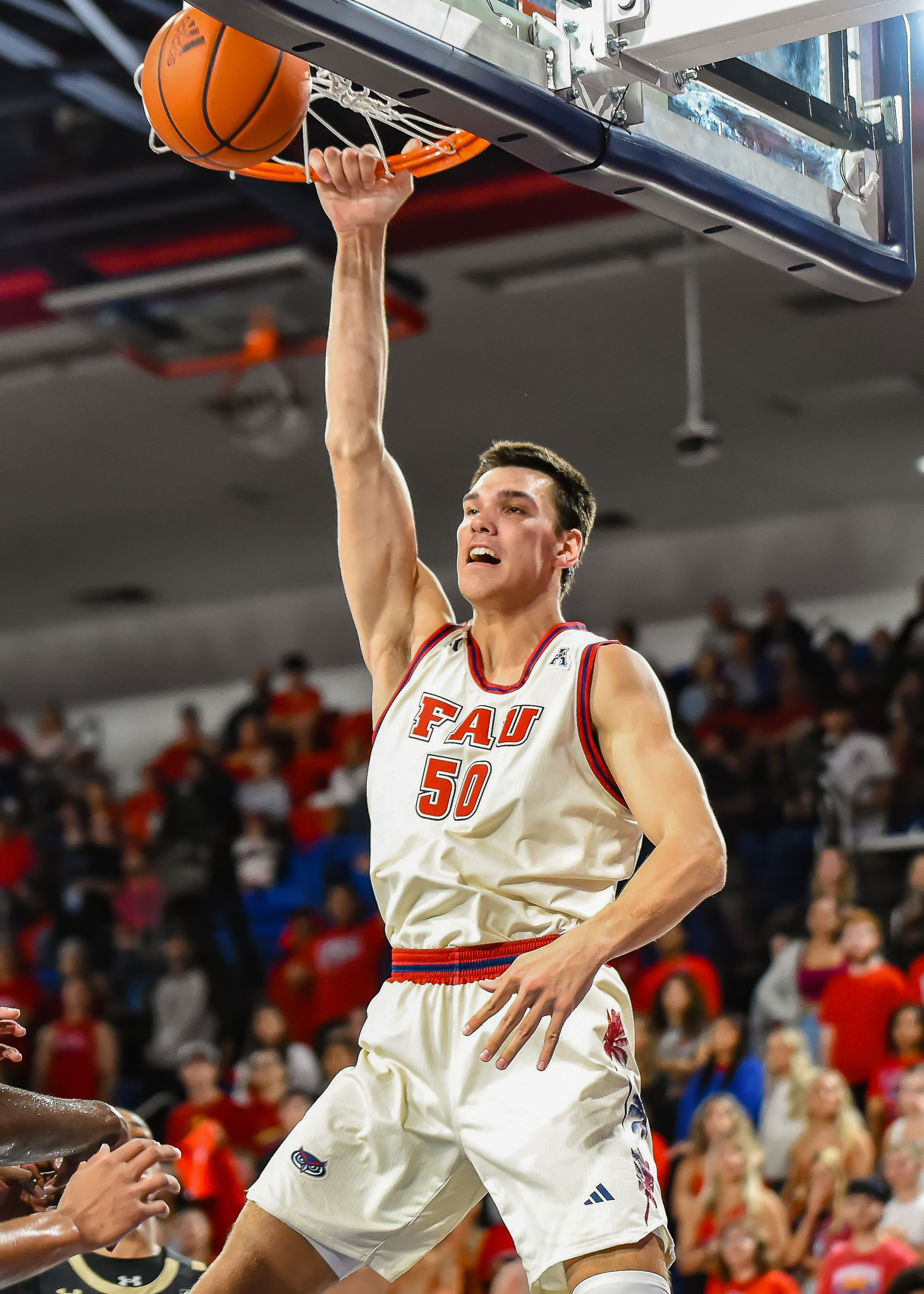
- Goldin with Florida Atlantic in 2024

No. 50 – Miami Heat
- Position: Center
- League: NBA

Personal information
- Born: 12 May 2001 (age 25) Nalchik, Kabardino-Balkaria, Russia
- Listed height: 7 ft 1 in (2.16 m)
- Listed weight: 260 lb (118 kg)

Career information
- High school: Putnam Science Academy (Putnam, Connecticut)
- College: Texas Tech (2020–2021); Florida Atlantic (2021–2024); Michigan (2024–2025)
- NBA draft: 2025: undrafted
- Playing career: 2025–present

Career history
- 2025–present: Miami Heat
- 2025–present: →Sioux Falls Skyforce

Career highlights
- First-team All-Big Ten (2025); Big Ten Tournament MVP (2025); Second-team All-AAC (2024); Third-team All-CUSA (2023)
- Stats at NBA.com
- Stats at Basketball Reference

Vladislav Aleksandrovich Goldin (Russian: Владислав Александрович Голдин; born 12 May 2001) is a Russian professional basketball player for the Miami Heat of the National Basketball Association (NBA), on a two-way contract with the Sioux Falls Skyforce of the NBA G League. He played college basketball for the Texas Tech Red Raiders, Florida Atlantic Owls and Michigan Wolverines. Goldin earned all-conference honors three times in his college career, including a first-team All-Big Ten selection in 2025.

== Early life and high school career ==
Goldin was born in Nalchik, Russia and later moved with his family to Voronezh, where he grew up. He was a competitive wrestler until age 15 and then began playing basketball after a significant growth spurt. Goldin played for PBC CSKA Junior for three seasons. He averaged 8.3 points, five rebounds and 1.4 blocks per game in his final season with the team.

Goldin moved to the United States for high school and enrolled at Putnam Science Academy in Putnam, Connecticut. He was rated as a four-star recruit and committed to play college basketball for Texas Tech.

== College career ==
=== Texas Tech ===
Goldin began his college career at Texas Tech. He played in ten games during his freshman season and averaged 1.9 points and one rebound per game. Following the end of the season, Goldin entered the NCAA transfer portal.

=== Florida Atlantic ===
Goldin transferred to Florida Atlantic University (FAU) in 2021. He averaged 6.8 points, 4.9 rebounds and 1.1 blocks per game in his first season with the Owls. In his second season with the Owls, Goldin was named third-team All-Conference USA, averaging 10.2 points per game, 6.5 rebounds and 1.2 blocked shots. He scored 14 points and 13 rebounds in FAU's 79–76 win over Kansas State in the Elite Eight of the 2023 NCAA tournament, leading the owls to the NCAA Final Four. In his third season with the Owls, fourth total, Goldin averaged 15.7 points per game, 6.9 rebounds and 1.6 blocked shots, leading FAU back to the NCAA tournament. After the season, he was named second-team All-American Athletic Conference (AAC) following the Owls change in conference.

=== Michigan ===
On April 29, 2024, Goldin withdrew from the NBA draft process. Instead, he transferred to the University of Michigan to join his former FAU head coach, Dusty May, in Ann Arbor. Goldin and current Michigan guard Nimari Burnett were both teammates and roommates as members of Texas Tech’s 2020 recruiting class. Goldin earned the starting center position for the Michigan Wolverines. On December 3, 2024, against Wisconsin, Goldin had 24 points, adding five rebounds and three blocked shots. On December 7 against Iowa, he scored a game-high 20 points and 11 rebounds for his first double-double of the season. During that week, he averaged 22.0 points, 8.0 rebounds, 2.0 blocks and shot 62.5 percent (15-for-24) from the field. He was subsequently named the Big Ten Player of the Week on December 9. On December 18 against Oklahoma, Goldin scored a then career-high 26 points, 11 rebounds and three blocked shots.

On January 7, 2025 against UCLA, Goldin scored a career-high 36 points with seven rebounds. Against the four ranked teams Michigan played to date, Goldin averaged 26.0 points, 7.0 rebounds, 2.25 blocks and shot 70.9 percent from the floor. In doing so, he became the first NCAA division 1 player in the last 25 years to average over 25.0 points and shoot at least 70 percent from the field in a four-game span against ranked opponents. The 36 points were the most by a Wolverine since Daniel Horton posted 39 on February 21, 2006 for the 2005–06 Wolverines. For the week, he averaged 27.5 points, 7.0 rebounds, and 2.5 assists while shooting 76%, to earn Co-Big Ten Player of the Week on January 13. On January 19 against Northwestern, Goldin had 31 points, eight rebounds and four blocks; his second career game scoring over 30 points. On March 5 against Maryland, he had 20 points and a career-high 15 rebounds, his fifth double-double of the season.

In March, Goldin was named a finalist for the Kareem Abdul-Jabbar Award, given to the nation’s best center each season. He also earned first-team All-Big Ten honors, selected by the media. Along with being awarded the MVP of the 2025 Big Ten tournament after leading Michigan to a Big Ten championship. On March 22, in the Second Round of the 2025 NCAA tournament against No. 4 seed Texas A&M, Goldin had 23 points, 12 rebounds and three blocks; earning his seventh double-double of the season and leading the Wolverines to the Sweet Sixteen.

== Professional career ==
On June 26, 2025, Goldin signed a two-way contract with the Miami Heat after going unselected in the 2025 NBA draft. In the 2025 NBA Summer League, he averaged 9.5 points and 5.3 rebounds in 17.7 minutes, including an 18-point, 10-rebound, 4-block finale in which he scored the game-winner with 11 seconds left in a 93–92 victory. On the eve of the November 7 opening of the NBA G League season for the Sioux Falls Skyforce, Goldin was called up to the Heat roster in response to an injury to Bam Adebayo. In his G League debut on November 21, against the Wisconsin Herd, he posted 23 points and 9 rebounds, making 10 of 13 field goal attempts including both of his three point shot attempts. With seven Heat players sidelined, he made his NBA debut on December 19, 2025 in the final minute of play against the Boston Celtics. He played the final 55 seconds and tallied one assist. On February 1, Goldin scored his first NBA points on a Jumpman style slam dunk during a three game in four night set against the Chicago Bulls.

The Heat extended Goldin a two-way contract for the 2026–27 season on June 29, 2026. Goldin was announced on June 30, as a member of the 2026 NBA Summer League roster for the Heat.

== Russian national team career ==
Goldin played for the Russian national team in the 2018 FIBA U18 European Championship, and the 2019 FIBA Under-19 Basketball World Cup.

== Career statistics ==
Legend
| GP | Games played | GS | Games started | MPG | Minutes per game |
| FG% | Field goal percentage | 3P% | 3-point field goal percentage | FT% | Free throw percentage |
| RPG | Rebounds per game | APG | Assists per game | SPG | Steals per game |
| BPG | Blocks per game | PPG | Points per game | **Bold** | Career high |

=== NBA ===
| Year | Team | GP | GS | MPG | FG% | 3P% | FT% | RPG | APG | SPG | BPG | PPG |
|---|---|---|---|---|---|---|---|---|---|---|---|---|
| 2025–26 | Miami | 9 | 0 | 2.7 | .750 | — | 1.000 | 1.0 | .3 | .0 | .3 | .8 |
| Career | | 9 | 0 | 2.7 | .750 | — | 1.000 | 1.0 | .3 | .0 | .3 | .8 |

=== College ===
| Year | Team | GP | GS | MPG | FG% | 3P% | FT% | RPG | APG | SPG | BPG | PPG |
|---|---|---|---|---|---|---|---|---|---|---|---|---|
| 2020–21 | Texas Tech | 10 | 0 | 4.7 | .353 | – | **1.000** | 1.0 | 0.2 | 0.2 | 0.1 | 1.9 |
| 2021–22 | Florida Atlantic | 34 | 33 | 17.6 | .554 | – | .593 | 4.9 | 0.3 | 0.4 | 1.1 | 6.8 |
| 2022–23 | Florida Atlantic | **39** | **39** | 20.9 | .625 | – | .591 | 6.5 | 0.4 | 0.4 | 1.2 | 10.2 |
| 2023–24 | Florida Atlantic | 34 | 34 | 25.0 | **.673** | – | .663 | 6.9 | 0.7 | **0.5** | **1.6** | 15.7 |
| 2024–25 | Michigan | 37 | 37 | **27.5** | .607 | **.333** | .731 | **7.0** | **1.1** | **0.5** | 1.4 | **16.6** |
| **Career** | | 154 | 143 | 21.6 | .616 | .333 | .668 | 6.0 | 0.6 | 0.4 | 1.3 | 11.7 |
