= 2022 College Basketball Invitational =

Single elimination college basketball tournament

- Teams: 16
- Finals site: Ocean Center, Daytona Beach, Florida
- Champions: UNC Wilmington Seahawks (1st title)
- Runner-up: Middle Tennessee Blue Raiders (1st title game)
- Semifinalists: Northern Colorado Bears (1st semifinal); Abilene Christian Wildcats (1st semifinal)
- Winning coach: Takayo Siddle (1st title)
- MVP: Jaylen Sims (UNC Wilmington)
- Attendance: 5,057 (tournament); 624 (championship game)

The 2022 College Basketball Invitational (CBI) was a single-elimination, fully-bracketed men’s college basketball postseason tournament featuring 16 National Collegiate Athletic Association (NCAA) Division I teams not selected to participate in the NCAA Division I men's basketball tournament or the National Invitation Tournament (NIT). The tournament began on March 19 and concluded on March 23. Semifinal and championship games aired on ESPN2. The tournament was won by UNC Wilmington.

In 2021, CBI was held for the first time in Daytona Beach, Florida, due to the COVID-19 pandemic. Previously, the tournament had been held on campus sites. In response to feedback received for the 2021 playing, CBI returned to the Ocean Center in 2022, which was the 14th edition of the tournament.

== Participating teams ==
Teams in the CBI were seeded 1–16.
Note: Team records are before playing in the tournament

Seed	Team	Conference	Record	Appearance	Last bid
1	Drake	Missouri Valley	24–10	1st	Never
2	Middle Tennessee	Conference USA	23–10	1st	Never
3	Ohio	Mid-American	24–9	3rd	2016
4	Stephen F. Austin	WAC	22–9	1st	Never
5	Florida Atlantic	Conference USA	19–14	1st	Never
6	Abilene Christian	WAC	23–10	1st	Never
7	UNC Greensboro	SoCon	17–14	2nd	2016
8	VMI	SoCon	16–15	1st	Never
9	UNC Wilmington	Colonial	23–9	1st	Never
10	Boston University	Patriot League	21–12	2nd	2010
11	Troy	Sun Belt	20–11	2nd	2009
12	Northern Colorado	Big Sky	20–15	1st	Never
13	UNC Asheville	Big South	16–14	1st	Never
14	Rice	Conference USA	16–16	2nd	2017
15	California Baptist	WAC	18–15	2nd	2019
16	Purdue Fort Wayne	Horizon	21–11	1st	Never

=== Declined invitation ===
There has been speculation that the following program might have declined an invitation to play in the 2022 CBI:

Bellarmine

== Schedule ==
Game	Time	Matchup	Score	Television	Attendance	Box score
First round – Saturday, March 19
1	12:00 p.m.	(1) Drake vs. (16) Purdue Fort Wayne	87–65	FloHoops	367	Box
2	2:30 p.m.	(4) Stephen F. Austin vs. (13) UNC Asheville	68–80	FloHoops	588	Box
3	5:00 p.m.	(2) Middle Tennessee vs. (15) California Baptist	64–58	FloHoops	578	Box
4	7:30 p.m.	(3) Ohio vs. (14) Rice	65–64	FloHoops	799	Box
First round – Sunday, March 20
5	12:00 p.m.	(8) VMI vs. (9) UNC Wilmington	78–93	FloHoops	762	Box
6	2:30 p.m.	(5) Florida Atlantic vs. (12) Northern Colorado	71–74	FloHoops	762	Box
7	5:00 p.m.	(7) UNC Greensboro vs. (10) Boston University	68–71	FloHoops	762	Box
8	7:30 p.m.	(6) Abilene Christian vs. (11) Troy	82–70	FloHoops	762	Box
Quarterfinals – Monday, March 21
9	1:00 p.m.	(1) Drake vs. (9) UNC Wilmington	75–76	FloHoops	706	Box
10	3:30 p.m.	(12) Northern Colorado vs. (13) UNC Asheville	87–84	FloHoops	706	Box
11	6:00 p.m.	(2) Middle Tennessee vs. (10) Boston University	76–46	FloHoops	706	Box
12	8:30 p.m.	(3) Ohio vs. (6) Abilene Christian	86–91	FloHoops	706	Box
Semifinals – Tuesday, March 22
13	7:00 p.m.	(9) UNC Wilmington vs. (12) Northern Colorado	80–64	ESPN2	633	Box
14	9:30 p.m.	(2) Middle Tennessee vs. (6) Abilene Christian	85–69	ESPN2	633	Box
Championship – Wednesday, March 23
15	5:00 p.m.	(2) Middle Tennessee vs. (9) UNC Wilmington	90–96 ^{2OT}	ESPN2	624	Box
Game times in Eastern Time. (#) Rankings denote tournament seed.

== Bracket ==
First round March 19 & 20
1	Drake	87
16	Purdue Fort Wayne	65
8	VMI	78
9	UNC Wilmington	93
4	Stephen F. Austin	68
13	UNC Asheville	80
5	Florida Atlantic	71
12	Northern Colorado	74
2	Middle Tennessee	64
15	California Baptist	58
7	UNC Greensboro	68
10	Boston University	71
3	Ohio	65
14	Rice	64
6	Abilene Christian	82
11	Troy	70

Quarterfinals; March 21
1	Drake	75
9	UNC Wilmington	76
13	UNC Asheville	84
12	Northern Colorado	87
2	Middle Tennessee	76
10	Boston University	46
3	Ohio	86
6	Abilene Christian	91

Semifinals; March 22
9	UNC Wilmington	80
12	Northern Colorado	64
2	Middle Tennessee	85
6	Abilene Christian	69

Championship; March 23
9	UNC Wilmington	96**
2	Middle Tennessee	90

* – Denotes overtime period
