= GEO Academies =

American academic organization

Founded in 1998 by Kevin Teasley, the Greater Education Opportunities (GEO) Academies (also known as GEO Foundation), operates network of eight charter schools in Gary and Indianapolis, Indiana and in the Baton Rouge area of Louisiana, serving 4,100 predominantly African-American and low-income students of grades K-12. The network claims a 94% graduation rate and an 88% college and career readiness rate. The organization is known especially for its college immersion model, through which many high school students earn college credits, including full associates or bachelors degrees, before graduating high school.

== Mission and Model ==
GEO Academies website states their missing to be "breaking the cycle of poverty by providing access to exceptional, non-traditional educational opportunities to all families." GEO Academies focuses on students' college and career readiness and earning college credit prior to 12th grade graduation. Using a "college immersion" model high school students take college classes on college campuses as a part of the regular college student body, while simultaneously pursuing their high school education. GEO covers the cost for these college classes, enabling students to earn college credit, associates, and bachelors degrees for free.

== History ==
Founded in 1998 by Kevin Teasley, GEO (Greater Education Opportunities) Foundation has radically altered the trajectory of impoverished students to succeed in college and career while still in high school through its innovative College Immersion Program. While only 10% of the students that GEO serves in Gary through its flagship school 21st Century Charter School come from homes with any college experience, GEO students earn an average of 19 college credits each, putting them in the top 5% of Indiana for college readiness. Nearly 30% of 2020 graduates earned a full college associate degree while still in high school.

In 2014, GEO’s success in Gary caught the attention of former Louisiana Superintendent of Education John White and an invitation by the Louisiana Department of Education to bring GEO’s college immersion model to Louisiana. Six years, four campuses, and 1,600 students later, GEO has earned the support of New Schools Baton Rouge and consistent “top gains” by the Louisiana Department of Education.

== Schools ==
- 21st Century Charter School, Gary, Indiana
- Gary Middle College, Gary, Indiana
- GEO Next Generation Academy, Indianapolis, Indiana
- GEO Focus Academy, Online School, Indiana
- GEO Prep Academy, Baton Rouge, Louisiana
- GEO Prep Mid-City Greater Baton Rouge, Baton Rouge, Louisiana
- GEO Prep Baker, Baker, Louisiana
- GEO Next Generation High School, Baton Rouge, Louisiana

== Publicity & Accomplishments ==
On April 26, 2005, CEO Kevin Teasley testified before the Committee on Education and the Workforce of the U.S. House of Representatives 109th Congress on the topic of "No Child Left Behind: Supplemental Tutoring for Children in Underachieving Schools."

In May 2017, GEO Foundation received national media attention as one of their students, Raven Osborne, became the first GEO Academies student and the first student in Indiana to earn a bachelors degree from Purdue University Northwest prior to her graduation from high school. Raven attended college on-campus throughout her high school career, with the full cost of her college education covered by her high school enrollment. Raven's story highlighting the GEO Academy college immersion model was covered by People Magazine, Teen Vogue, The CBS Evening News, and USA Today.

U.S. Secretary of Education, Betsy DeVos, visited GEO Foundation schools in Gary, Indiana as part of her “Rethink School” national tour, during which she joined a panel with Raven Osborne. DeVos credited GEO Foundation leaders and school administrators and teachers for being creative and “expand[ing] student-centered education opportunities.”

Stanford University's Center for Research of Education Outcomes (CREDO) has noted GEO Academies to be in the top 25% of the country in terms of academic growth, and top 33% in math and reading performance overall

GEO Foundation has been cited by several public education think tanks. The Center on Reinventing Public Education (CRPE) in its “Rethinking Career Technical Education," and the American Enterprise Institute published a study in May 2019 entitled, “A Small School with Big Chances”: The 21st Century Charter School at Gary.”

In 2022, GEO Academies received Indiana Black Expo's Rev. Charles E. Williams Excellence Award for promoting African-American achievement in academics, athletics, business, education or the arts, noting: "At a time when African Americans and low-income families continue to face the consequence of income inequality and lack of access to affordable higher education, the work of GEO Academies supports the upward mobility of economically disadvantaged and underserved African American students."

On March 6, 2024, Kenneth Campbell, CEO of New Schools Baton Rouge, referenced GEO Academies during his testimony before the Subcommittee on Early Childhood, Elementary, and Secondary Education of the Committee on Education and the Workforce of the U.S. House of Representatives 118th Congress, stating that in 2023, 50% of GEO Academies graduates earned at least one full year of college credit, with 10% earning full college degrees, before graduating from high school.

== Board of Directors ==
- Jeff Ready (Board Chair) - CEO, Scale Computing
- Geoff Baum - Chief Executive, Michelson Philanthropies
- John Gottsman - President & CEO, The Clarity Group
- Rob Kremer - Director of Government Relations, Pearson NA
- Kevin Teasley - CEO & Founder, GEO Foundation
- Jeremiah Tate - Senior Hardware Design Engineer, Microsoft
