= Johnell Davis =

American basketball player (born 2001)

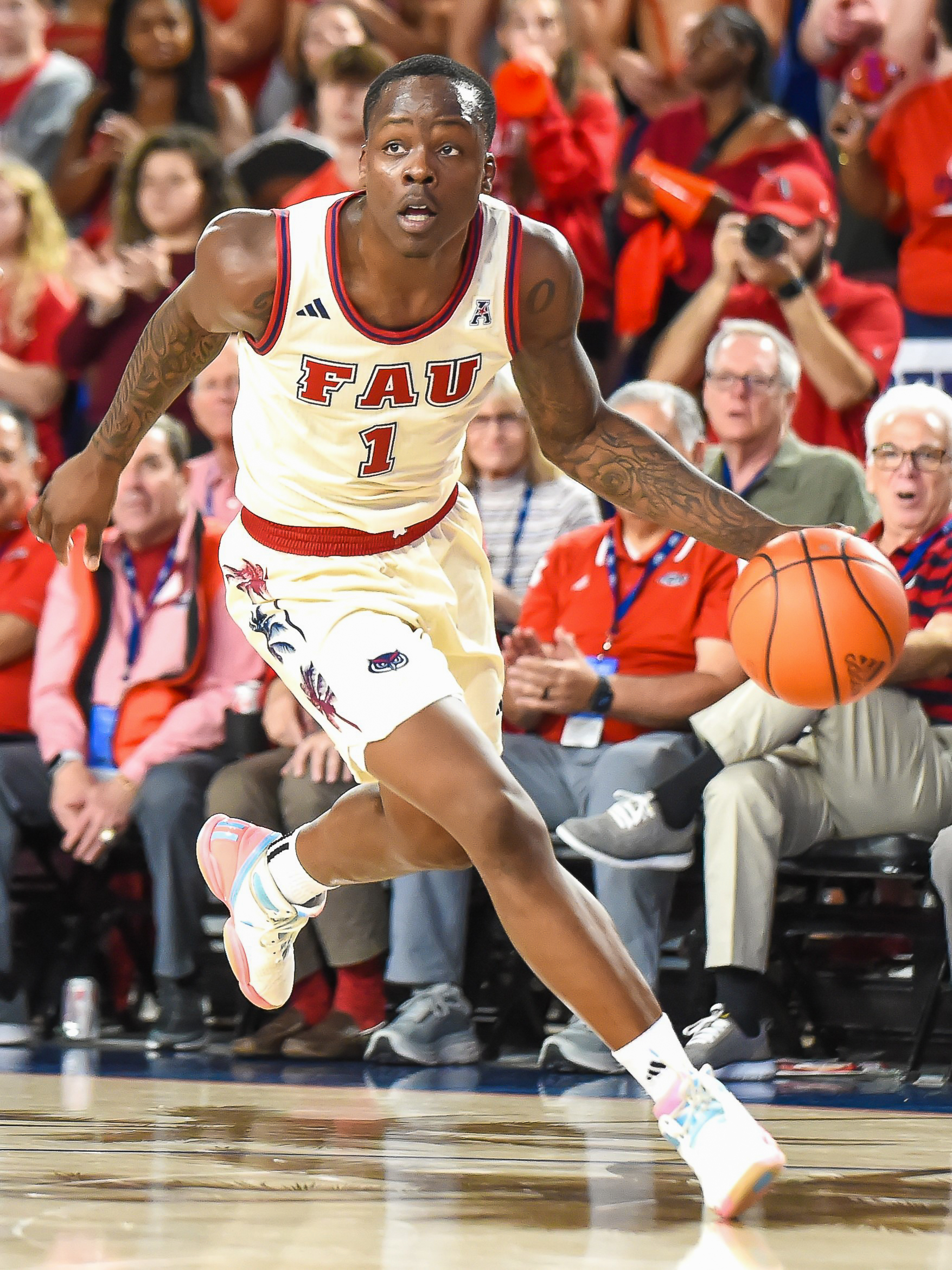
- Davis with Florida Atlantic

No. 10 – Osceola Magic
- Position: Point guard / shooting guard
- League: NBA G League

Personal information
- Born: May 23, 2001 (age 25) Gary, Indiana, U.S.
- Listed height: 6 ft 4 in (1.93 m)
- Listed weight: 210 lb (95 kg)

Career information
- High school: 21st Century (Gary, Indiana)
- College: Florida Atlantic (2020–2024); Arkansas (2024–2025)
- NBA draft: 2025: undrafted
- Playing career: 2025–present

Career history
- 2025–present: Osceola Magic

Career highlights
- AAC co-Player of the Year (2024); First-team All-AAC (2024); First-team All-Conference USA (2023); Conference USA Sixth Player of the Year (2023)
- Stats at NBA.com
- Stats at Basketball Reference

Johnell Davis (born May 23, 2001) is an American basketball player for the Osceola Magic of the NBA G League. He played college basketball for the Florida Atlantic Owls and the Arkansas Razorbacks.

== High school career ==
Davis played basketball for 21st Century Charter School in Gary, Indiana. As a senior, he averaged 31.4 points, 9.8 rebounds, 4.6 steals and 2.6 assists per game, earning player of the year honors from the Post-Tribune and The Times of Northwest Indiana. He helped his team win four straight sectional titles. Davis broke the school's career and single-game (53) scoring records held by Eugene German. He committed to play college basketball for Florida Atlantic over offers from Northern Illinois, Miami (Ohio) and Kent State.

== College career ==
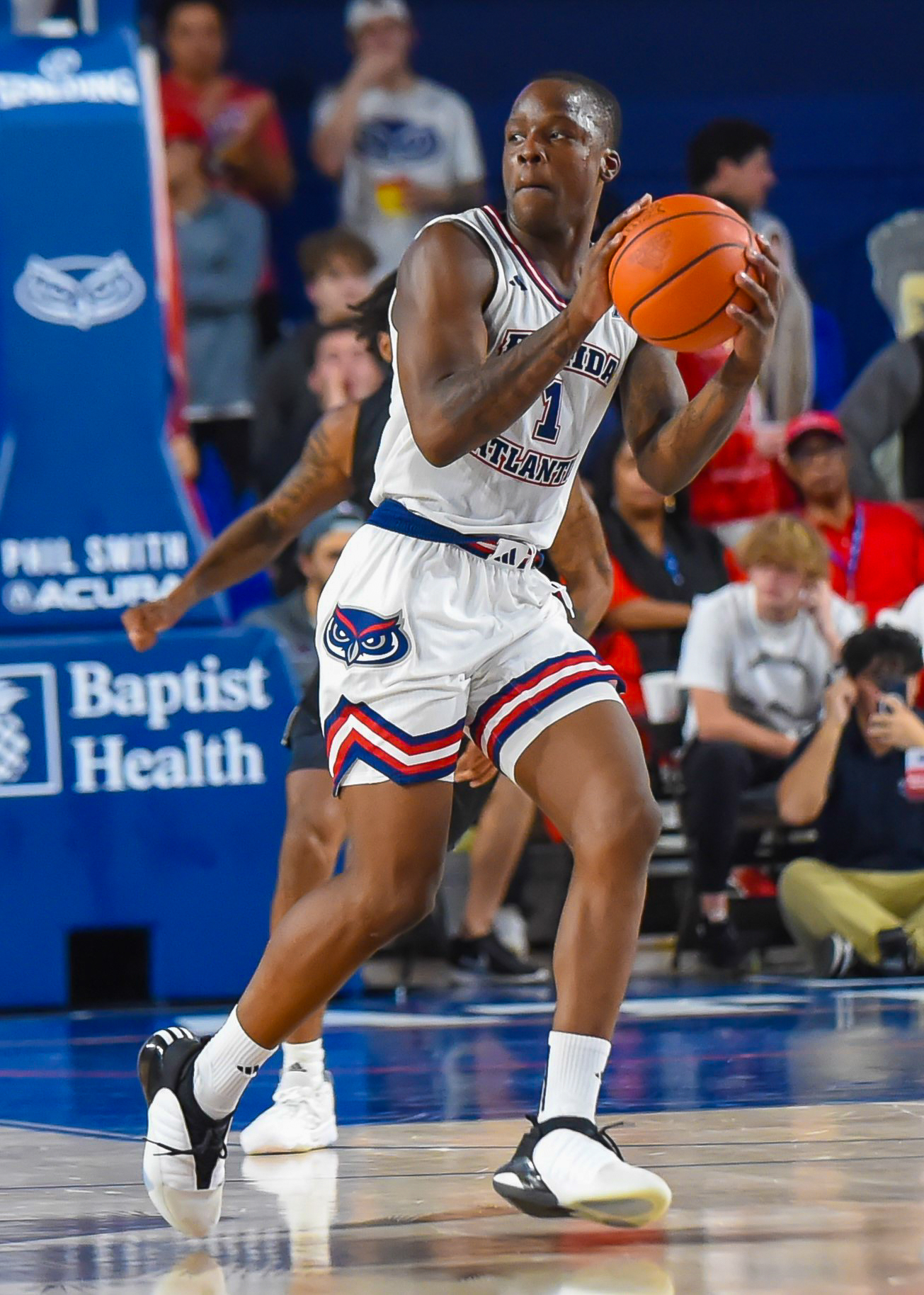
Johnell Davis playing with the Florida Atlantic Owls in 2023.

As a freshman at Florida Atlantic, Davis averaged 3.3 points and 2.9 rebounds per game. In his sophomore season, he averaged 6.8 points and 4.2 rebounds per game. Davis moved into a leading role as a junior, despite initially coming off the bench due to injuries. He helped Florida Atlantic achieve its best season in program history, with Conference USA regular season and tournament titles. Davis was named first-team All-C-USA and C-USA Sixth Player of the Year. In the second round of the 2023 NCAA tournament, he recorded 29 points, 12 rebounds, five assists, five steals in a 78–70 win over Fairleigh Dickinson. In FAU's victory, Davis became the first player in NCAA Tournament history to tally 25 points, 10 rebounds, five assists and five steals in a single game.

== Professional career ==
In October 2025, Davis signed an Exhibit 10 deal with the Orlando Magic.

== Career statistics ==
Legend
GP	Games played	GS	Games started	MPG	Minutes per game
FG%	Field goal percentage	3P%	3-point field goal percentage	FT%	Free throw percentage
RPG	Rebounds per game	APG	Assists per game	SPG	Steals per game
BPG	Blocks per game	PPG	Points per game	**Bold**	Career high

=== College ===
Year	Team	GP	GS	MPG	FG%	3P%	FT%	RPG	APG	SPG	BPG	PPG
2020–21	Florida Atlantic	23	0	9.7	.475	.231	.769	2.8	1.0	.6	**.2**	3.2
2021–22	Florida Atlantic	34	3	19.0	.463	.333	.804	4.2	1.0	1.1	**.2**	6.8
2022–23	Florida Atlantic	**37**	16	26.0	**.486**	.357	.855	5.4	1.6	**1.5**	.1	13.8
2023–24	Florida Atlantic	34	**34**	**32.2**	.483	**.414**	.857	**6.3**	**2.9**	1.4	**.2**	**18.2**
2024–25	Arkansas	34	29	31.6	.390	.328	**.866**	3.4	1.6	1.4	**.2**	12.0
Career		162	82	24.7	.458	.353	.849	4.5	1.7	1.3	.2	11.3
