= North Pike School District =

School district in Mississippi

Address
- 1036 Jaguar Trail Summit, Pike County, Mississippi; United States

District information
- Schools: 5
- NCES District ID: 2803240

Students and staff
- Students: 2,196
- Teachers: 156.19 FTE
- Student–teacher ratio: 14.06:1

Other information
- Website: www.npsd.k12.ms.us/en

The North Pike School District is a public school district based in unincorporated Pike County, Mississippi, United States, with a Summit postal address.

In addition to a small portion of the Summit city limits, the district also serves rural areas in northern Pike County.

== Schools ==
- North Pike High School
- North Pike Middle School
- North Pike Elementary School
- North Pike Upper Elementary School
- North Pike Career and Technical Center
- North Pike Superintendent's Office

== Demographics ==
=== 2006-07 school year ===
There were a total of 2,097 students enrolled in the North Pike School District during the 2006–2007 school year. The gender makeup of the district was 50% female and 50% male. The racial makeup of the district was 31.66% African American, 67.29% White, 0.29% Hispanic, 0.57% Asian, and 0.19% Native American. 42.9% of the district's students were eligible to receive free lunch.

== Athletics ==
Sports at North Pike include football (varsity and junior varsity), basketball (Jags and Lady Jags), baseball, fast pitch softball, bowling, cross country, soccer, golf, track and field, tennis, dance, and cheer for middle school or higher.

== Programs ==
North Pike offers the NPSD Dropout prevention program, which gives students a second chance and more activities to finish their courses to prevent dropping out.

The Jag to Jag program is offered to help younger students.

In 2023, the high school launched a program called "See Something Say Something". This program allows students to report anything they see that is wrong, anonymously. Examples of things student can report include vaping, fighting, threats against another student or the school, bomb threats, bullying, and sexual harassment.

=== Previous school years ===
School year	Enrollment	Gender makeup		Racial makeup				
School year	Enrollment	Female	Male	Asian	African American	Hispanic	Native American	White
2005-06	2,001	49%	51%	0.50%	31.98%	0.20%	0.20%	67.12%
2004-05	1,810	51%	49%	0.66%	31.33%	0.11%	0.06%	67.85%
2003-04	1,788	50%	50%	0.78%	32.16%	0.17%	–	66.89%
2002-03	1,727	49%	51%	0.46%	32.08%	0.06%	0.12%	67.28%

== Accountability statistics ==
	2006-07	2005-06	2004-05	2003-04	2002-03
District accreditation status	Accredited	Accredited	Accredited	Accredited	Accredited
School performance classifications
Level 5 (Superior Performing) Schools	1	2	2	1	0
Level 4 (Exemplary) Schools	1	1	1	2	2
Level 3 (Successful) Schools	1	0	0	0	1
Level 2 (Under Performing) Schools	0	0	0	0	0
Level 1 (Low Performing) Schools	0	0	0	0	0
Not assigned	0	0	0	0	0

== See also ==
- List of school districts in Mississippi
