= Florida Atlantic Owls men's basketball =

Men's basketball team of Florida Atlantic University

Florida Atlantic Owls basketball
2025–26 Florida Atlantic Owls men's basketball team
- University: Florida Atlantic University
- Head coach: John Jakus (2nd season)
- Location: Boca Raton, Florida
- Arena: Eleanor R. Baldwin Arena (capacity: 2,900)
- Conference: American Conference
- Nickname: Owls
- Colors: Blue and red
- All-time record: 473–635 (.427)

NCAA Division I tournament Final Four
- 2023
Other NCAA Division I tournament results
Elite Eight	2023
Sweet Sixteen	2023
Appearances	2002, 2023, 2024

Conference tournament champions
- Atlantic Sun: 2002; C-USA: 2023

Conference regular-season champions
- Sun Belt: 2011; C-USA: 2023

Conference division champions
- Sun Belt East: 2011

Uniforms
Home	Away	Alternate

The Florida Atlantic Owls men's basketball team represents Florida Atlantic University and competes in the American Conference of NCAA Division I college basketball. Their home games are played on the Abessinio Court in the Eleanor R. Baldwin Arena on the school's Boca Raton, Florida campus. The Owls have appeared in the NCAA tournament three times: in 2002, 2023, and 2024. The Owls joined Conference USA (C-USA) in 2013 as part of the early-2010s NCAA conference realignment. After the 2022–23 season, FAU left C-USA for the American Conference. After not winning a single NCAA Tournament game coming into 2023, the Owls qualified for their first Final Four in program history by defeating the Kansas State Wildcats 79–76.

== Overview and history ==
Florida Atlantic University basketball began play in the 1988–89 season. The Owls competed as an NCAA Division II independent until the 1993–94 season, when they moved up to Division I and the Atlantic Sun Conference, now known as the ASUN Conference. After spending 11 seasons in the Atlantic Sun, the Owls moved to the Sun Belt Conference, with the rest of Florida Atlantic University's intercollegiate sports teams. The Owls moved to C-USA in July 2013, and then moved to The American in July 2023.

=== Beginning: FAU gets basketball (1988–1993) ===
Florida Atlantic University played its first-ever intercollegiate basketball contest on November 18, 1988, against fellow local NCAA Division II school, Palm Beach Atlantic University. The Owls won the game 111–62. Even though the newly formed college squad hung 111 points in their first game, they would finish the inaugural season 9–19, which included a 12-game losing streak in the middle of the year. Head coach, Lonnie Williams, was known to be a "program-builder", but after one year, left FAU after its first season to become head coach at the University of California, Davis. Williams would only last one year at UC Davis, posting an 11–16 record.

Replacing Williams was Penn State assistant coach, Tim Loomis. Loomis started his coaching career with a 21–7 record, and followed that up with back-to-back 15–13 seasons. The three consecutive winning seasons is a feat that no other Owls coach has ever matched, until Dusty May did it in his first three seasons. Along with the winning seasons, Loomis was able to schedule games against neighbor and powerhouse, University of Miami Hurricanes. Though Miami would beat the Owls soundly in the appearances, the ability to schedule games against them was seen as the Owls basketball program's growth. Loomis would lose the core of that inaugural team after the Owls' fourth season, and the Owls would suffer devastating 3–24 (1992–93) and 3–25 (1993–94) seasons the latter being their first official year as Division One. The members of these teams were true pioneers and super fundraisers for the athletic department as they hit the road to play teams like Florida State, Georgetown, and Iowa State while taking large paydays and suffering losses to higher ranked (#10 Georgetown) opponents. In fact, Loomis' team beat NC State on the road in 1993–94 to become the first Atlantic Sun team to ever beat an ACC team at the time.

=== Move to Division I (1993–2005) ===
The 1993–94 season would mark the beginning of the Owls competition in the NCAA Division I. The Owls joined the Atlantic Sun Conference later, mostly due to the fact that the Owls baseball team was exceeding expectations so early in its development. In 1994–95, the team improved to 9–19 while in Loomis' last year. The team repeated that win total in 1995–96 under new coach Kevin Billerman but showed improvement by taking South Florida, Saint Louis, and Southern Illinois to close road losses determined by the last possession, while winning two conference games to end the season. Former Duke Blue Devil captain and leader, Kevin Billerman, was hired to further lead the Owls into Division I; his second season produced the most wins of any Division One FAU men's basketball coach up to that point. Due to NCAA's rule, the Owls were not eligible for the NCAA tournament for four years, with their first season of tournament eligibility coming in 1993–94. In Billerman's four seasons, the Owls had two 20+ loss seasons (his last two) and only one winning season (his second).

For the 1999–2000 season, FAU hired decorated UNLV All-American forward/center and NBA first-round draft pick Sidney Green. In his first season, Green's Owls went 2–28, with a 25-game losing streak in the middle of the season. In each of his first and second seasons, the Owls would win their opening round game in the Atlantic Sun Conference Tournament, but would lose in the second round.

==== 2001–02 season: A-Sun champions ====
During the 2001–02 season, Green would lead the Owls to his only winning season, as FAU finished 19–12 and 13–7 in the Atlantic Sun. In the first-round of the 2002 Atlantic Sun Conference Tournament, FAU would again win their opening game, this time defeating Jacksonville University. The Owls would break their second-round losing tradition, beating Jacksonville State University. In the Atlantic Sun Conference Championship, the Owls faced Georgia State University and won 76–75, clinching their first conference championship and a bid to the NCAA Division I men's basketball tournament.

In the 2002 NCAA tournament, the Owls were seeded as a 15-seed, and placed in the South Region, and were paired with 2-seed Alabama. Though the Owls hung tight throughout the game, heavily favored Alabama held on to win 86–78.

=== Coaching carousel (2005–2018) ===
Green was fired after the 2004–05 season and the Owls landed former NCAA Coach of the Year and Tar Heel Matt Doherty. Doherty led the Owls to a 15–13 record and then left abruptly to become the head coach at Southern Methodist University.

With the rapid success of the football program, created from scratch just in 2001, the Florida Atlantic sports programs again moved up in level of competition. This time, the Owls would move to the Sun Belt Conference, and basketball played its first season of competition in the Sun Belt in the 2006–07 season. To replace Doherty, assistant coach and former Kansas Jayhawk star, Rex Walters, was elevated. In his first season, Walters' Owls were 16–15 and 10–8 in the Sun Belt. The 16–15 marked the first time FAU posted back-to-back winning seasons since the 1989–90 and 1990–91 seasons. The 10–8 conference record was only the fourth time the Owls had a winning record in conference play. Walters' sophomore season regressed a bit, as FAU finished 15–18. After the 2007–08 season completed, Rex Walters accepted the head coaching job at the University of San Francisco, and for the third time in four years, the Owls were searching for a new coach.

FAU hired Mike Jarvis as their new coach. Jarvis had been the head coach at Boston University, George Washington University and, most recently, St. John's University. Between the three schools, Jarvis led his teams to nine total NCAA tournament appearances, including an Elite Eight appearance with St. John's in 1999. Jarvis was fired from St. John's on December 19, 2003—the first Big East Conference coach to be fired during the season. It later emerged that school officials had fired Jarvis in part due to a series of embarrassing off-court incidents. Among these, a junior college transfer had been charged with assaulting a female student, and a senior guard had been kicked off the team after being caught smoking marijuana near St. John's campus in Queens. During the 2003–04 season, St. John's center Abe Keita claimed that a member of Jarvis's basketball staff had paid him nearly $300 a month for the past four seasons. As a result, St. John's placed itself on two years' probation, withdrew from postseason consideration for the 2004–05 season, and forfeited 43 wins including the 2002 NCAA Tournament and the 2003 NIT. Jarvis was faulted for not properly monitoring Keita's situation. After his ouster, Jarvis was criticized for ignoring New York City's rich pool of high school players, which particularly rankled fans used to seeing national powerhouses built primarily on New York City talent. At FAU, he looked to become the first coach in NCAA basketball history to win 100 games at four different schools. Following the 2014 season, Jarvis resigned after reports indicated that he was going to be fired. He finished with a 76–112 after six years in Boca Raton.

On April 7, 2014, the school hired Michael Curry, a former NBA player and coach of the Detroit Pistons. Curry's teams never finished with more than 12 wins overall or more than six wins in conference. They never finished higher than 11th in C-USA. Following the hiring of a new athletic director, Brian White, Curry was fired after four seasons at the school and a 39–84 record.

=== Dusty May era and 2023 Final Four run (since 2018) ===
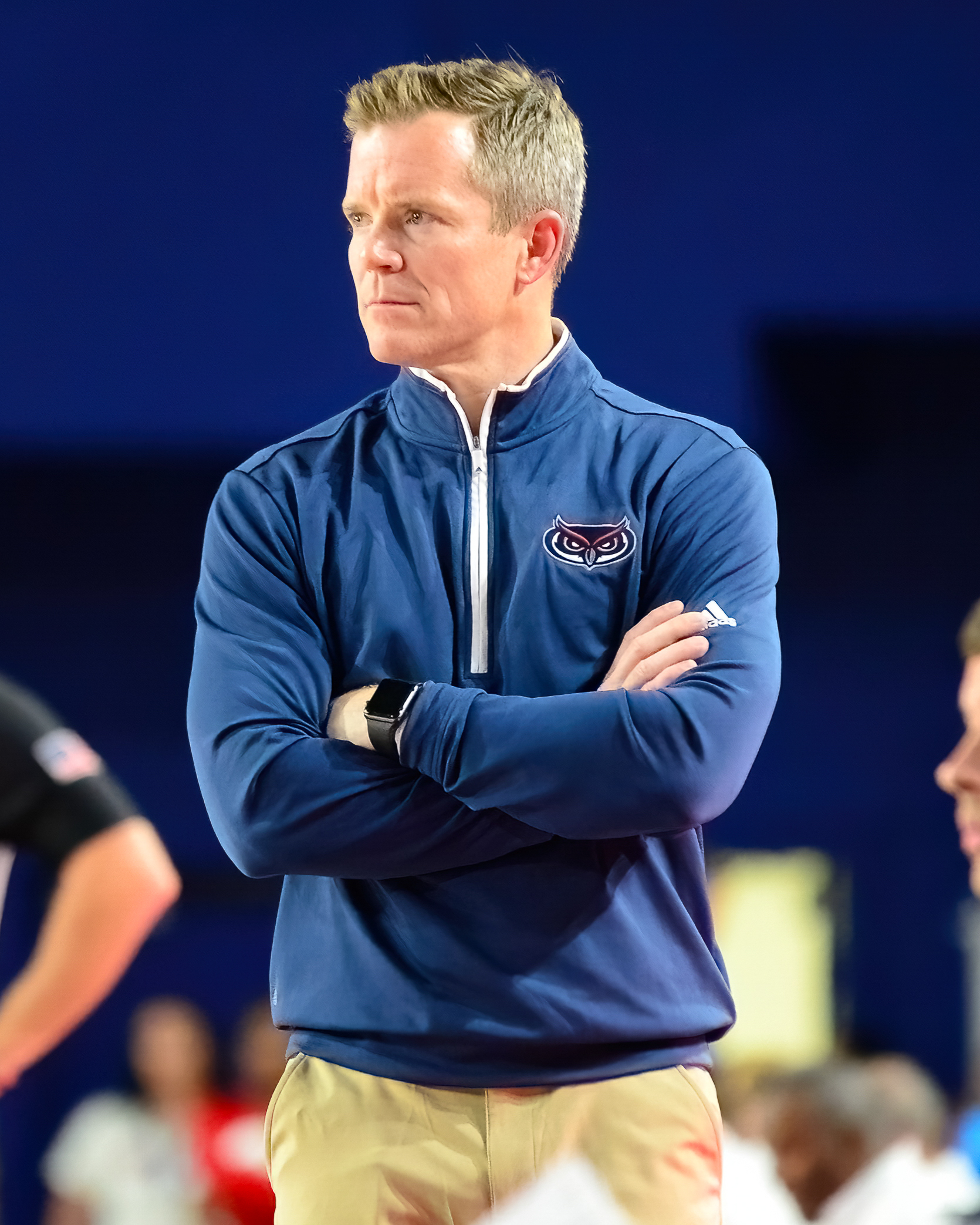
May in 2023

White, brother to then-Florida head coach Mike White, thanked Curry for his years at FAU, but saw no reason the Owls could not compete in C-USA. On March 22, 2018, the school hired Florida assistant coach Dusty May as head coach.

The FAU Owls began to experience much improved results and consistent success under May, as they finished that first season in 2018-19 with an above .500 record at 17-15 and an invite to the 2019 CIT, where they lost to the Charleston Southern Buccaneers in the first round, 68-66. The Owls followed that success with winning records in each of the first 5 seasons with Dusty May at the helm.

The 2022-23 FAU Owls, led by May, had their most successful season in program history, going 31-3 en-route to winning that season’s Conference USA Championship for both the regular season and the conference tournament. During that season, FAU was ranked in the Associated Press Top 25 for the first time in school history, as they at one point won 20 consecutive games. In March of 2023, the Owls made the NCAA Tournament for only the second time in program history and remarkably, made it to the Final Four in Houston after defeating the Kansas State Wildcats 79-76 in the Elite Eight at Madison Square Garden. The Owls then narrowly lost to the San Diego State Aztecs in that Final Four, 72-71, as San Diego State’s Lamont Butler hit a buzzer-beating jumpshot to help the Aztecs advance to the 2023 NCAA Tournament National Championship Game. The 2022-23 FAU Owls finished the season 35-4, the most wins of any program in Men’s Division I College Basketball that season.

Despite making the Final Four and rumors of players transferring the following season, FAU ran it back with their squad for the 2023-24 season. The team finished 25-9, making their second-straight March Madness appearance. However, FAU lost in the first round of the 2024 NCAA Tournament to the Northwestern Wildcats, 77-65, in overtime at the Barclays Center.

=== John Jakus enters the scene ===
After making it to two straight NCAA Tournament appearances, head coach Dusty May left FAU to take a job with the Michigan Wolverines. It was a five year deal worth $18.75 million in base compensation.

As a result of May's departure, FAU lost their star players to the transfer portal. FAU's leading scorer Johnell Davis transferred to Arkansas. Alijah Martin transferred to Florida. Nick Boyd transferred to San Diego State. Giancarlo Rosado transferred to Charlotte. Vlad Goldin joined May and transferred to Michigan.

In replace of May, FAU hired John Jakus as their new head coach on March 27, 2024.

== Current coaching staff ==
Name	Current Title	Joined FAU	Alma mater
John Jakus	Head coach	2024	Baylor
Aditya Malhotra	Assistant coach	2024	Baylor
Todd Abernethy	Assistant coach	2019	Mississippi
Jordan Fee	Assistant coach	2024	West Liberty
Isaiah Austin	Assistant coach	2024	Baylor
Brendan Riggs	Director of Basketball Operations	2024	Bethany

== Postseason ==
=== NCAA tournament results ===
The Owls have appeared in the NCAA tournament three times. Their combined record to date is 4–3.

Year	Seed	Round	Opponent	Result
2002	No. 15	First Round	No. 2 Alabama	L 78–86
2023	No. 9	First Round; Second Round; Sweet Sixteen; Elite Eight; Final Four	No. 8 Memphis; No. 16 Fairleigh Dickinson; No. 4 Tennessee; No. 3 Kansas State; No. 5 San Diego State	W 66–65; W 78–70; W 62–55; W 79–76; L 71–72
2024	No. 8	First Round	No. 9 Northwestern	L 65–77 ^{OT}

=== NIT results ===
The Owls have appeared in the National Invitation Tournament (NIT) twice. Their record is 0–2.

Year	Round	Opponent	Result
2011	First Round	Miami (FL)	L 62–85
2025	First Round	Dayton	L 79–86

=== CBI results ===
The Owls have appeared in the College Basketball Invitational once. Their combined record is 0–1.

Year	Round	Opponent	Result
2022	First Round	Northern Colorado	L 71–74

=== CollegeInsider.com Postseason Tournament (CIT) results ===
The Owls have appeared in one CollegeInsider.com Postseason Tournament (CIT). Their record is 0–1.

Year	Round	Opponent	Result
2019	First Round	Charleston Southern	L 66–68

== Team records ==
=== All-time record vs. current AAC teams ===
Official record (including any NCAA imposed vacates and forfeits) against all current AAC opponents as of the completion of the 2022–23 season:

Opponent	Games Played	Won	Lost	Percentage	Streak	First Meeting	Recent Meeting
Charlotte	14	8	6	.571	Won 4	2014	2023
East Carolina	4	2	2	.500	Lost 1	1993	2015
Memphis	2	1	1	.500	Won 1	1993	2023
North Texas	22	8	14	.363	Won 2	2007	2023
Rice	10	6	4	.600	Won 4	2014	2023
SMU	2	0	2	.000	Lost 1	1997	1998
South Florida	16	2	14	.125	Lost 2	1993	2019
Temple	0	0	0	--	--	--	--
Tulane	5	0	5	.000	Lost 5	1993	2014
Tulsa	1	0	1	.000	Lost 1	2014	2014
UAB	18	5	13	.278	Won 1	2008	2023
UTSA	16	10	6	.625	Won 3	2014	2023
Wichita State	1	0	1	.000	Lost 1	1998	1998

Through April 1, 2023.

== Owls in international leagues ==
- Aleksandar Zečević (born 1996), Serbian basketball player in the Israeli Basketball Premier League
