= Marshall Thundering Herd men's basketball statistical leaders =

The Marshall Thundering Herd men's basketball statistical leaders are individual statistical leaders of the Marshall Thundering Herd men's basketball program in various categories, including points, rebounds, assists, steals, and blocks. Within those areas, the lists identify single-game, single-season, and career leaders. The Thundering Herd represent Marshall University in the NCAA Division I Sun Belt Conference.

Marshall began competing in intercollegiate basketball in 1906. However, the school's record book does not generally list records from before the 1950s, as records from before this period are often incomplete and inconsistent. Since scoring was much lower in this era, and teams played much fewer games during a typical season, it is likely that few or no players from this era would appear on these lists anyway.

The NCAA did not officially record assists as a stat until the 1983–84 season, and blocks and steals until the 1985–86 season, but Marshall's record books includes players in these stats before these seasons. These lists are updated through the end of the 2021–22 season.

== Scoring ==
Career
Rk	Player	Points	Seasons
1	Taevion Kinsey	2,641	2018–19 2019–20 2020–21 2021–22 2022–23
2	Jon Elmore	2,638	2015–16 2016–17 2017–18 2018–19
3	Skip Henderson	2,574	1984–85 1985–86 1986–87 1987–88
4	John Taft	2,332	1987–88 1988–89 1989–90 1990–91
5	Walt Walowac	1,982	1950–51 1951–52 1952–53 1953–54
6	C. J. Burks	1,892	2015–16 2016–17 2017–18 2018–19
7	Russ Lee	1,815	1969–70 1970–71 1971–72
8	J. R. VanHoose	1,803	1998–99 1999–00 2000–01 2001–02
9	Tamar Slay	1,792	1998–99 1999–00 2000–01 2001–02
10	Ryan Taylor	1,778	2013–14 2014–15 2015–16 2016–17

Season
Rk	Player	Points	Season
1	Jon Elmore	816	2017–18
2	Skip Henderson	804	1987–88
3	John Taft	764	1990–91
4	Jon Elmore	750	2018–19
5	Taevion Kinsey	706	2022–23
6	Leo Byrd	704	1958–59
7	C. J. Burks	702	2017–18
8	John Taft	701	1988–89
9	Walt Walowac	698	1952–53
10	Jon Elmore	691	2016–17

Single game
Rk	Player	Points	Season	Opponent
1	Skip Henderson	55	1987–88	The Citadel
2	Keith Veney	51	1996–97	Morehead State
3	Bunny Gibson	50	1977–78	Chattanooga
4	Skip Henderson	46	1985–86	Charleston (WV)
	George Stone	46	1966–67	Nebraska
6	Skip Henderson	44	1987–88	Chattanooga
	Ronald Blackshear	44	2001–02	Akron
	Jon Elmore	44	2018–19	UTEP
9	John Taft	43	1990–91	ETSU
10	John Taft	42	1988–89	South Alabama

== Rebounds ==
Career
Rk	Player	Rebounds	Seasons
1	Charlie Slack	1,916	1952–53 1953–54 1954–55 1955–56
2	J. R. VanHoose	1,086	1998–99 1999–00 2000–01 2001–02
3	Ryan Taylor	985	2013–14 2014–15 2015–16 2016–17
4	Bob Burgess	973	1959–60 1960–61 1961–62
5	Bob Allen	919	1965–66 1966–67 1967–68
6	Russ Lee	863	1969–70 1970–71 1971–72
7	Rodney Holden	812	1984–85 1985–86 1986–87 1987–88
8	Obinna Anochili-Killen	792	2020–21 2021–22 2022–23 2023–24 2024–25
9	Dave Smith	789	1968–69 1969–70 1970–71
10	Hal Greer	765	1955–56 1956–57 1957–58

Season
Rk	Player	Rebounds	Season
1	Charlie Slack	538	1954–55
2	Charlie Slack	520	1955–56
3	Charlie Slack	466	1953–54
4	Charlie Slack	392	1952–53
5	Bob Allen	388	1966–67
6	Bob Burgess	356	1959–60
7	Bob Allen	354	1967–68
8	Dennis Tinnon	349	2011–12
9	Randy Noll	339	1971–72
10	Nate Martin	334	2023–24

Single game
Rk	Player	Rebounds	Season	Opponent
1	Charlie Slack	43	1953–54	Morris Harvey
2	Charlie Slack	34	1953–54	Miami (OH)
3	Charlie Slack	33	1954–55	Kent State
4	Charlie Slack	32	1954–55	Bowling Green
5	Charlie Slack	31	1954–55	Western Michigan
	Charlie Slack	31	1954–55	Ohio
7	Charlie Slack	30	1953–54	Morris Harvey
	Charlie Slack	30	1953–54	Indiana State
	Charlie Slack	30	1954–55	Carnegie Tech
	Charlie Slack	30	1954–55	Morris Harvey
	Charlie Slack	30	1954–55	Toledo
	Charlie Slack	30	1955–56	Boston College
	Charlie Slack	30	1955–56	Denver

== Assists ==
Career
Rk	Player	Assists	Seasons
1	Jon Elmore	783	2015–16 2016–17 2017–18 2018–19
2	Greg White	701	1977–78 1978–79 1979–80 1980–81
3	Mike D'Antoni	659	1970–71 1971–72 1972–73
4	Taevion Kinsey	550	2018–19 2019–20 2020–21 2021–22 2022–23
5	Sam Henry	519	1980–81 1981–82 1982–83 1983–84
6	Cornelius Jackson	518	1998–99 1999–00 2000–01
7	Damier Pitts	517	2008–09 2009–10 2010–11 2011–12
8	Joe Hickman	499	1972–73 1973–74 1974–75 1975–76
9	Skip Henderson	470	1984–85 1985–86 1986–87 1987–88
10	Andrew Taylor	456	2019–20 2020–21 2021–22 2022–23

Season
Rk	Player	Assists	Season
1	Jon Elmore	244	2017–18
2	Mike D'Antoni	241	1971–72
3	Mike D'Antoni	228	1972–73
4	Cornelius Jackson	218	1999–00
5	Jon Elmore	207	2016–17
6	Greg White	198	1977–78
7	DeAndre Kane	195	2012–13
8	Joe Hickman	192	1974–75
9	Sam Henry	190	1981–82
	Mike D'Antoni	190	1970–71

Single game
Rk	Player	Assists	Season	Opponent
1	Greg White	18	1979–80	CCNY
2	Greg White	16	1977–78	Chattanooga
	Greg White	16	1977–78	Davidson
	Mike D'Antoni	16	1971–72	Western Michigan
	Mike D'Antoni	16	1970–71	St. Francis
6	Cornelius Jackson	15	1999–00	Central Michigan
	Greg Battle	15	1982–83	CCNY
8	Kareem Canty	14	2013–14	Alice Lloyd
	Mike D'Antoni	14	1972–73	Central Michigan
	Taevion Kinsey	14	2019–20	Howard

== Steals ==
Career
Rk	Player	Steals	Seasons
1	Jarrod West	254	2017–18 2018–19 2019–20 2020–21
2	Skip Henderson	208	1984–85 1985–86 1986–87 1987–88
3	Andrew Taylor	201	2019–20 2020–21 2021–22 2022–23
4	David Wade	186	1980–81 1981–82 1982–83 1983–84
5	Jon Elmore	181	2015–16 2016–17 2017–18 2018–19
6	Travis Young	173	1997–98 1998–99 1999–00 2000–01
7	Jeff Battle	172	1981–82 1982–83 1983–84 1984–85
8	Taevion Kinsey	168	2018–19 2019–20 2020–21 2021–22 2022–23
9	Sam Henry	161	1980–81 1981–82 1982–83 1983–84
10	Tink Brown	150	1992–93 1993–94 1994–95

Season
Rk	Player	Steals	Season
1	Jarrod West	80	2018–19
2	Sidney Coles	75	1995–96
	Jeff Guthrie	75	1984–85
4	Sidney Coles	72	1996–97
5	Andrew Taylor	67	2022–23
6	Tyrone Phillips	65	1992–93
	Jarrod West	65	2019–20
8	Jon Elmore	64	2018–19
9	Andrew Taylor	59	2021–22
10	Jon Elmore	58	2017–18
	Tink Brown	58	1994–95
	Kevon Voyles	58	2023–24

Single game
Rk	Player	Steals	Season	Opponent
1	Shawn Moore	10	1993–94	ETSU
2	David Wade	8	1983–84	Marquette
	Jeff Battle	8	1983–84	Furman
4	Travis Young	7	1999–00	Rio Grande
	Sidney Coles	7	1995–96	Georgia Southern
	Jarrod West	7	2020–21	Robert Morris
	Andrew Taylor	7	2021–22	Louisiana
8	Taevion Kinsey	6	2022–23	Queens University
	Andrew Taylor	6	2020–21	North Texas
	Jarrod West	6	2019–20	Bluefield State
	Jon Elmore	6	2017–18	Concord
	Chris Thomas	6	2013–14	WKU
	Chris Lutz	6	2008–09	Morgan State
	Mark Dorris	6	2006–07	Tulane
	Travis Young	6	2000–01	Winthrop
	Sidney Coles	6	1996–97	Furman
	Troy Gray	6	1994–95	Chattanooga
	Jeff Guthrie	6	1985–86	Fresno State

== Blocks ==
Career
Rk	Player	Blocks	Seasons
1	Obinna Anochili-Killen	286	2020–21 2021–22 2022–23 2023–24 2024–25
2	Jannson Williams	196	2017–18 2018–19 2019–20 2020–21
3	Hassan Whiteside	182	2009–10
4	Ajdin Penava	180	2015–16 2016–17 2017–18
5	Omar Roland	148	1988–89 1989–90
6	Charles Jones	140	1979–80 1980–81 1981–82 1982–83
7	Tom Curry	138	1972–73 1985–86 1986–87 1987–88
8	Derrick Wright	137	1996–97 1997–98 1998–99 1999–00
9	Nigel Spikes	123	2009–10 2010–11 2011–12 2012–13
10	Ryan Taylor	122	2013–14 2014–15 2015–16 2016–17

Season
Rk	Player	Blocks	Season
1	Hassan Whiteside	182	2009–10
2	Ajdin Penava	134	2017–18
3	Obinna Anochili-Killen	102	2024–25
4	Omar Roland	101	1989–90
5	Obinna Anochili-Killen	86	2021–22
6	Micah Handlogten	75	2022–23
7	Jannson Williams	72	2018–19
8	Jean Francois Bro-Grebe	65	2006–07
9	Nigel Spikes	60	2012–13
10	Charles Jones	58	1982–83
	Matt Van Komen	58	2025–26

Single game
Rk	Player	Blocks	Season	Opponent
1	Hassan Whiteside	13	2009–10	UCF
2	Hassan Whiteside	11	2009–10	Brescia
3	Hassan Whiteside	10	2009–10	UCF
	Obinna Anochili-Killen	10	2021–22	Jackson State
5	Obinna Anochili-Killen	9	2024–25	Louisiana
	Obinna Anochili-Killen	9	2024–25	Georgia State
	Ajdin Penava	9	2017–18	EKU
	Ajdin Penava	9	2017–18	Ohio
	Ajdin Penava	9	2017–18	Chattanooga
	Nigel Spikes	9	2012–13	UCF
	Hassan Whiteside	9	2009–10	Ohio
	Latece Williams	9	2000–01	Charleston (WV)
	Omar Roland	9	1989–90	Chattanooga
