= List of Marshall Thundering Herd in the NBA draft =

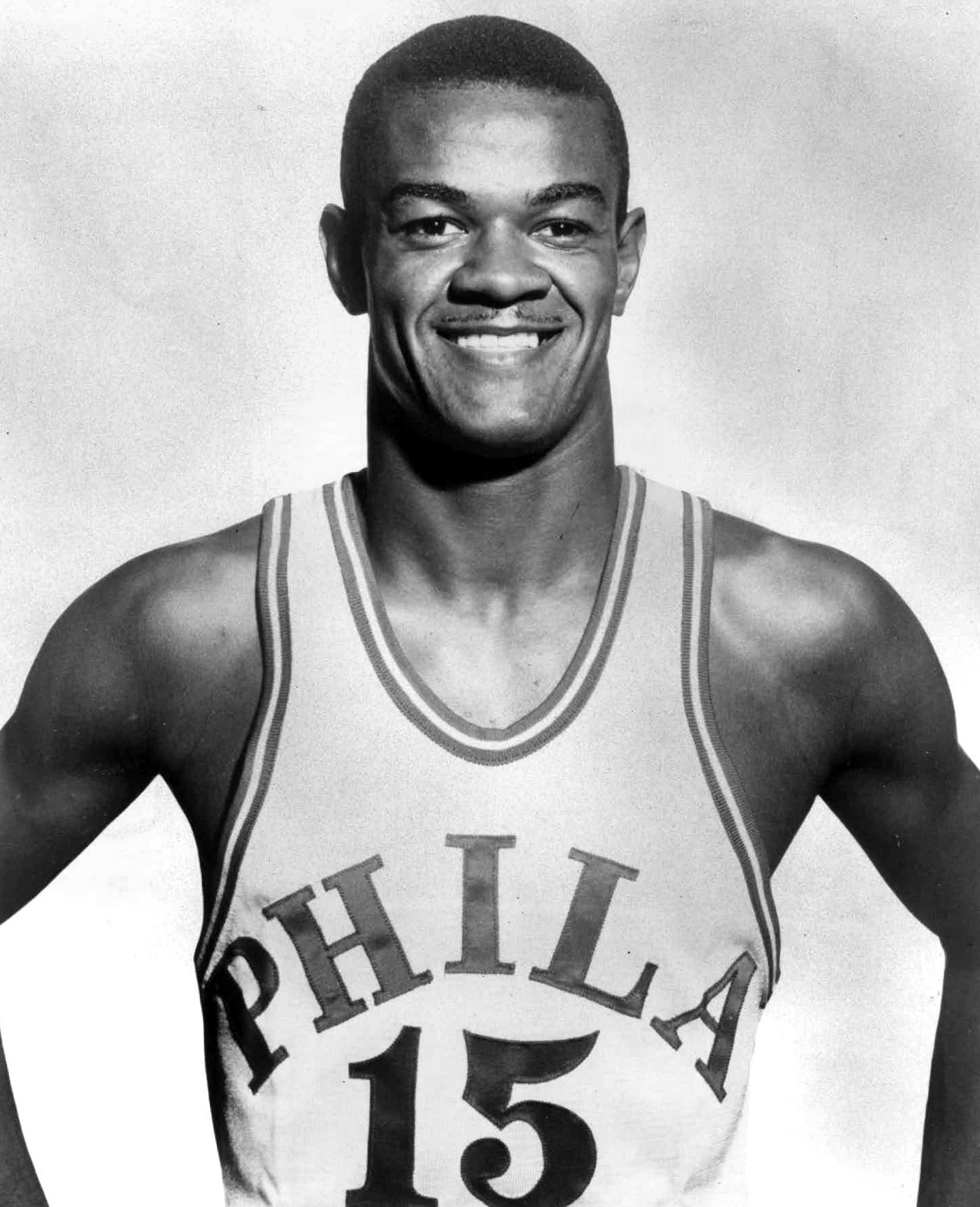
Hal Greer was drafted thirteenth overall by the Syracuse Nationals in the 1958 NBA draft.

The Marshall Thundering Herd men's basketball team, representing the Marshall University, has had 20 players drafted into the National Basketball Association (NBA) since the league began holding the yearly event in 1947. Andy Tonkovich was the first Marshall player drafted when he was selected first overall in the 1948 draft.

Each NBA franchise seeks to add new players through an annual draft. The NBA uses a draft lottery to determine the first three picks of the NBA draft; the 14 teams that did not make the playoffs the previous year are eligible to participate. After the first three picks are decided, the rest of the teams pick in reverse order of their win–loss record. To be eligible for the NBA draft, a player in the United States must be at least 19 years old during the calendar year of the draft and must be at least one year removed from the graduation of his high school class. From 1967 until the ABA–NBA merger in 1976, the American Basketball Association (ABA) held its own draft.

== Key ==
G	Guard	F	Forward	C	Center

*	Selected to an NBA/ABA All-Star Game
†	Won an NBA/ABA championship
‡	Selected to an All-Star Game and won an NBA/ABA championship

== Players selected in the NBA draft ==
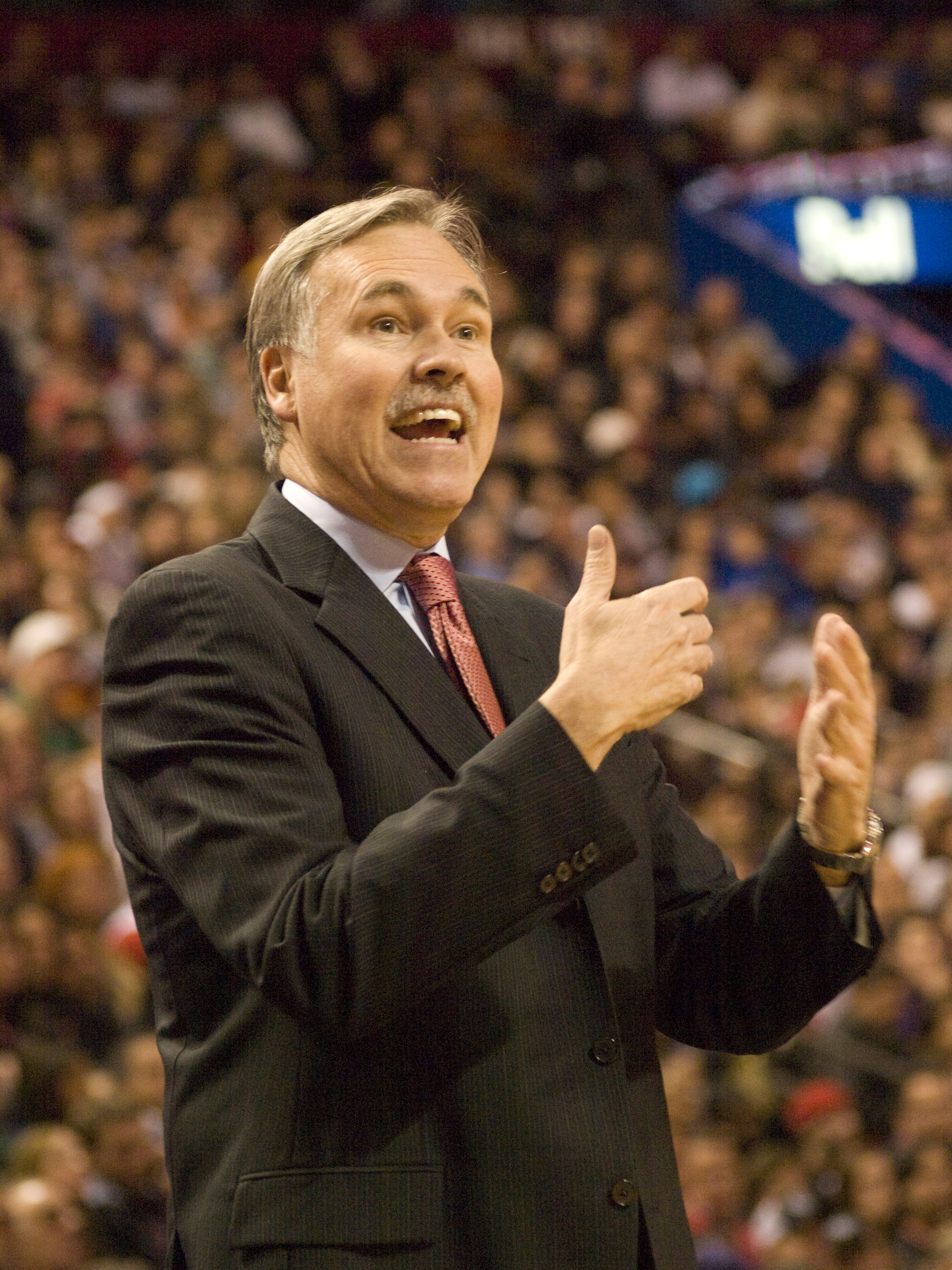
Mike D'Antoni was drafted twentieth overall by the Kansas City-Omaha Kings in the 1973 NBA draft.

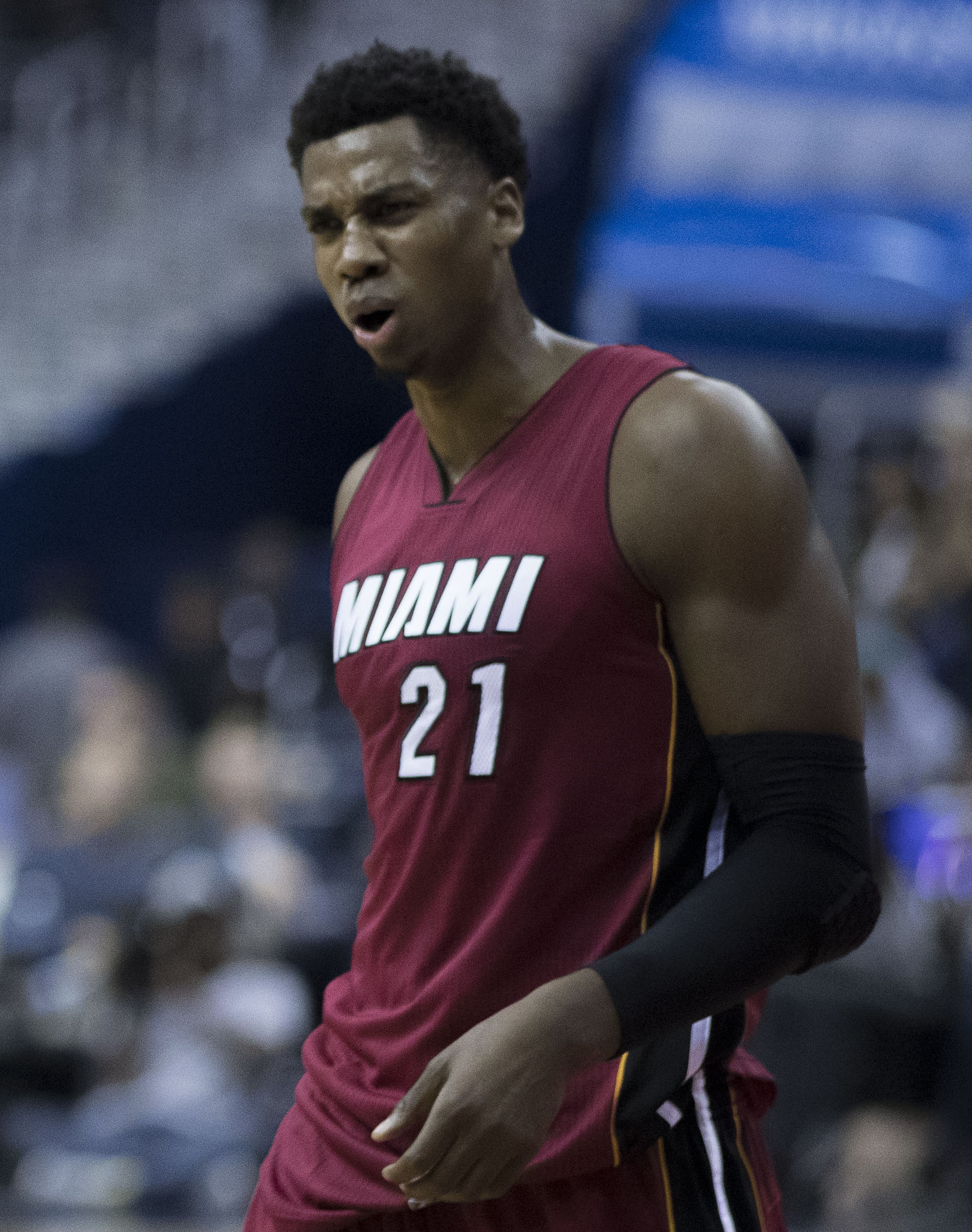
Hassan Whiteside was drafted 33rd overall by the Sacramento Kings in the 2010 NBA draft.

Marshall Thundering Herd selected in the NBA draft
Year	Round	Pick	Overall	Name	Position	Team (Note: This is the team that drafted the player, not their most recent team.)	Notes
1948	1	1	1	Andy Tonkovich	G	Providence Steamrollers	—
1954	3	2	20	Walt Walowac	G	Milwaukee Hawks	—
1956	4	—	30	Charlie Slack	F	Fort Wayne Pistons	—
1957	8	6	61	Cebe Price	G	Syracuse Nationals	—
1958	2	6	13	Hal Greer^{‡}	G	Syracuse Nationals	NBA All-Star (1961, 1962, 1963, 1964, 1965, 1966, 1967, 1968, 1969, 1970); NBA All-Star Game MVP (1968); NBA Champion (1967); All-NBA Second Team (1963, 1964, 1965, 1966, 1967, 1968, 1969); Naismith Memorial Basketball Hall of Fame Inductee (2006)
1959	4	1	25	Leo Byrd	G	Cincinnati Royals	—
1960	13	1	85	John Milhoan	G	Cincinnati Royals	—
1962	5	2	36	Bob Burgess	F	New York Knicks	—
1968	6	7	71	Bob Allen	F	San Francisco Warriors	—
1968	9	9	115	George Stone^{†}	F	Los Angeles Lakers	ABA Champion (1971)
1968	11	7	141	Bob Redd	G	New York Knicks	—
1971	11	14	182	Blaine Henry	C	Milwaukee Bucks	—
1972	1	6	6	Russ Lee	G, F	Milwaukee Bucks	—
1972	6	8	88	Randy Noll (Note: The NBA had a rule which stated a player was not eligible for the NBA Draft until four years after he graduated high school. Randy Noll was eligible for the NBA Draft as a junior since he transferred from Kentucky. Noll was a junior at Marshall when he was selected with the 88th pick in the 1972 NBA Draft by the Atlanta Hawks. He chose to return to Marshall for his senior year and was later drafted by the Buffalo Braves with the 72nd pick in the 1973 NBA Draft.)	F	Atlanta Hawks	—
1973	2	2	20	Mike D'Antoni	G	Kansas City-Omaha Kings	—
1973	5	3	72	Randy Noll	F	Buffalo Braves	—
1983	9	12	196	Charles Jones	C	New York Knicks	—
1984	6	14	130	LaVerne Evans	F	Dallas Mavericks	—
1985	7	18	157	Don Turney	C	Indiana Pacers	—
2002	2	24	54	Tamar Slay	G	New Jersey Nets	—
2010	2	3	33	Hassan Whiteside	F, C	Sacramento Kings	NBA All-Defensive Second Team (2016)
