= 2019–20 Marshall Thundering Herd men's basketball team =

American college basketball season

2019–20 Marshall Thundering Herd men's basketball
- Conference: Conference USA
- Record: 17–15 (10–8 C-USA)
- Head coach: Dan D'Antoni (6th season)
- Assistant coaches: Mark Cline; Scott Rigot; Cornelius Jackson
- Home arena: Cam Henderson Center

2019–20 Conference USA men's basketball standings
	Conf.				Overall
Team	W		L	PCT	W		L	PCT
North Texas	14	–	4	.778	20	–	11	.645
Western Kentucky	13	–	5	.722	20	–	10	.667
Louisiana Tech	13	–	5	.722	22	–	8	.733
Charlotte	10	–	8	.556	16	–	13	.552
FIU	9	–	9	.500	19	–	13	.594
Marshall	10	–	8	.556	17	–	15	.531
UAB	9	–	9	.500	19	–	13	.594
Old Dominion	9	–	9	.500	13	–	19	.406
Florida Atlantic	8	–	10	.444	17	–	15	.531
UTSA	7	–	11	.389	13	–	19	.406
UTEP	8	–	10	.444	17	–	15	.531
Rice	7	–	11	.389	15	–	17	.469
Southern Miss	5	–	13	.278	9	–	22	.290
Middle Tennessee	4	–	14	.222	8	–	23	.258
Note: The 2020 C-USA tournament was canceled prior to the quarterfinals due to the COVID-19 pandemic.

The 2019–20 Marshall Thundering Herd men's basketball team represented Marshall University during the 2019–20 NCAA Division I men's basketball season. The Thundering Herd, led by sixth-year head coach Dan D'Antoni, played their home games at the Cam Henderson Center as members of Conference USA. They finished the season 17–15, 10–8 in C-USA play to finish in sixth place. They defeated UTEP and were scheduled to play Louisiana Tech in the quarterfinals of the C-USA tournament. However, the tournament canceled due to the coronavirus pandemic.

== Previous season ==
The Thundering Herd finished the 2018–19 season 23–14, 11–7 in C-USA play to finish in sixth place. They defeated Rice before losing to Southern Miss in the quarterfinals of the C-USA tournament. They were invited to the CollegeInsider.com Tournament where they defeated IUPUI, Presbyterian, Hampton and Green Bay to become CIT champions.

== Offseason ==
=== Departures ===
Name	Number	Pos.	Height	Weight	Year	Hometown	Notes
C. J. Burks	14	G	6'4"	185	RS Senior	Martinsburg, West Virginia	Graduated
Jon Elmore	33	G	6'3"	187	RS Senior	Charleston, West Virginia	Graduated
DeAundra Murphy	24	G	6'3"	169	Freshman	Huntington, West Virginia	Walk-on; did not return
Ante Šustić	12	F	6'10"	235	Senior	Split, Croatia	Graduate transferred to Central Missouri
Christian Thieneman	0	F	6'5"	215	RS Junior	Louisville, Kentucky	Graduated
Wilhelm von Arndt	25	G	6'0"	175	Freshman	Stockholm, Sweden	Walk-on; did not return
Rondale Watson	23	G	6'4"	187	RS Senior	Lewisburg, West Virginia	Graduated

=== 2019 recruiting class ===
College recruiting information
Name	Hometown	School	Height	Weight	Commit date
Dajour Rucker; SF	Virginia Beach, Virginia	Cape Henry Collegiate School	6 ft 6 in (1.98 m)	220 lb (100 kg)	Apr 29, 2018
Dajour Rucker; SF	Recruit ratings: Scout: Rivals: 247Sports: (NR)				
Goran Miladinovic; C	Hoosick, New York	Hoosac School	7 ft 0 in (2.13 m)	215 lb (98 kg)	Apr 24, 2019
Goran Miladinovic; C	Recruit ratings: Scout: Rivals: (NR)				
Marko Sarenac; SF	Hoosick, New York	Hoosac School	6 ft 7 in (2.01 m)	190 lb (86 kg)	Apr 24, 2019
Marko Sarenac; SF	Recruit ratings: Scout: Rivals: (NR)				
Overall recruit ranking: Scout: NR Rivals: NR ESPN: NR
Note: In many cases, Scout, Rivals, 247Sports, On3, and ESPN may conflict in their listings of height and weight.; In these cases, the average was taken. ESPN grades are on a 100-point scale.; Sources: "Marshall Basketball Commitment List". Rivals.; "2019 Marshall Basketball Commits". Scout.; "ESPN". ESPN.; "Scout.com Team Recruiting Rankings". Scout.; "2019 Team Ranking". Rivals.

== Roster ==
2019–20 Marshall Thundering Herd men's basketball team
Players
Coaches

Pos.	#	Name	Height	Weight	Year	Previous school	Hometown
G	0	Andrew Taylor	6 ft 3 in (1.91 m)	195 lb (88 kg)	RS Fr	Corbin	Corbin, Kentucky
G	1	Taevion Kinsey	6 ft 5 in (1.96 m)	185 lb (84 kg)	So	Eastmoor	Columbus, Ohio
F	2	Iran Bennett	6 ft 9 in (2.06 m)	299 lb (136 kg)	RS So	Hargrave	Durham, North Carolina
F	3	Jannson Williams	6 ft 9 in (2.06 m)	215 lb (98 kg)	RS Jr	Newnan	Newnan, Georgia
G	4	Ty Sturm (W)	6 ft 2 in (1.88 m)	175 lb (79 kg)	Fr	Cabell Midland	Hurricane, West Virginia
G/F	5	Jeremy Dillon	6 ft 5 in (1.96 m)	200 lb (91 kg)	RS Fr	Mingo Central	Mingo, West Virginia
G	11	Luke Thomas	6 ft 0 in (1.83 m)	176 lb (80 kg)	So	Fairland	Proctorville, Ohio
G	13	Jarrod West	5 ft 11 in (1.8 m)	185 lb (84 kg)	Jr	Notre Dame HS	Clarksburg, West Virginia
G	14	Robby Williams (W)	5 ft 10 in (1.78 m)	150 lb (68 kg)	Fr	Charleston Catholic	Charleston, West Virginia
G/F	15	Marko Sarenac	6 ft 7 in (2.01 m)	200 lb (91 kg)	Fr	Hoosac	Ljubovija, Serbia
F	21	Darius George	6 ft 7 in (2.01 m)	215 lb (98 kg)	Jr	Staunton (Robert E. Lee)	Staunton, Virginia
F	24	Cam Brooks-Harris	6 ft 6 in (1.98 m)	175 lb (79 kg)	RS Fr	Zanesville	Zanesville, Ohio
F	31	Mikel Beyers	6 ft 9 in (2.06 m)	215 lb (98 kg)	Jr	Mesa CC	Houston, Texas
F	32	Dajour Rucker	6 ft 7 in (2.01 m)	250 lb (113 kg)	Fr	Cape Henry	Virginia Beach, Virginia
G	35	Devin Collins (W)	6 ft 8 in (2.03 m)	185 lb (84 kg)	Fr	Chapmanville	Chapmanville, West Virginia
C	50	Goran Miladinovic	7 ft 0 in (2.13 m)	230 lb (104 kg)	Fr	Hoosac	Tivat, Montenegro

Head coach

- Dan D'Antoni (Marshall)

Assistant coach(es)

- Mark Cline (Wake Forest)
- Scott Rigot (Buffalo)
- Cornelius Jackson (Marshall)

Legend

- (C) Team captain
- (S) Suspended
- (I) Ineligible
- (W) Walk-on
- Injured
- Current redshirt

Roster
Last update: 12/30/2019

== Schedule and results ==
Date time, TV	Rank^{#}	Opponent^{#}	Result	Record	High points	High rebounds	High assists	Site (attendance) city, state
Exhibition
Oct 29, 2019*; 6:00 pm, Facebook		Glenville State	W 100–66		19 – Brooks-Harris	13 – Beyers	7 – Beyers	Cam Henderson Center (5,297); Huntington, WV
Nov 2, 2019*; 1:00 pm, Facebook		Rio Grande	W 92–59		15 – Beyers	8 – Miladinovic	7 – West	Cam Henderson Center (5,642); Huntington, WV
Non-conference regular season
Nov 7, 2019*; 7:00 pm, WVAH 11.2		Robert Morris; MABC Invitational	W 67–60	1–0	20 – West	10 – Brooks-Harris	5 – Kinsey	Cam Henderson Center (5,530); Huntington, WV
Nov 10, 2019*; 2:00 pm, ESPN3		Toledo; MABC Invitational	L 70–96	1–1	20 – Tied	7 – Brooks-Harris	3 – Kinsey	Cam Henderson Center (5,645); Huntington, WV
Nov 15, 2019*; 7:00 pm, ACCNX		at Notre Dame; MABC Invitational	L 64–74	1–2	16 – Kinsey	11 – Kinsey	5 – Kinsey	Edmund P. Joyce Center (7,831); South Bend, IN
Nov 19, 2019*; 7:00 pm, WVAH 11.2		College of Charleston	L 66–76	1–3	13 – Kinsey	8 – Bennett	2 – 3 Tied	Cam Henderson Center (6,384); Huntington, WV
Nov 21, 2019*; 8:00 pm, ESPN3		Howard; MABC Invitational	W 91–63	2–3	17 – Bennett	7 – Kinsey	14 – Kinsey	Cam Henderson Center (5,343); Huntington, WV
Nov 29, 2019*; 9:00 pm, SECN		at No. 24 Florida	L 67–73	2–4	16 – Bennett	6 – Tied	5 – West	O'Connell Center (10,583); Gainesville, FL
Dec 4, 2019*; 7:00 pm, WVAH 11.2		Akron	L 73–85	2–5	17 – West	6 – Bennett	5 – Kinsey	Cam Henderson Center (5,350); Huntington, WV
Dec 8, 2019*; 2:00 pm, ESPN+		at Toledo	L 74–82	2–6	19 – West	9 – Beyers	6 – Kinsey	Savage Arena (3,887); Toledo, OH
Dec 11, 2019*; 7:00 pm, ESPN3		Bluefield State	W 86–50	3–6	18 – West	8 – Miladinovic	6 – Kinsey	Cam Henderson Center (5,106); Huntington, WV
Dec 16, 2019*; 7:00 pm, ESPN+		at Morehead State	W 89–62	4–6	16 – George	7 – George	8 – West	Ellis Johnson Arena (2,134); Morehead, KY
Dec 19, 2019*; 7:00 pm, ESPN3		Eastern Kentucky	W 90–72	5–6	21 – Bennett	16 – Bennett	5 – Taylor	Cam Henderson Center (5,057); Huntington, WV
Dec 22, 2018*; 2:00 pm, ESPN+		at Northern Iowa	L 80–88	5–7	27 – Taylor	5 – Tied	4 – Taylor	McLeod Center (4,648); Cedar Falls, IA
Dec 29, 2019*; 2:30 pm		vs. Duquesne; Cleveland Classic	W 83–61	6–7	22 – West	8 – Tied	6 – West	Rocket Mortgage FieldHouse (16,780); Cleveland, OH
Conference USA regular season
Jan 2, 2020; 7:00 pm, ESPN+		Rice	W 89–69	7–7 (1–0)	19 – Kinsey	8 – Taylor	8 – Kinsey	Cam Henderson Center (5,311); Huntington, WV
Jan 4, 2020; 2:00 pm, ESPN+		North Texas	L 64–67	7–8 (1–1)	19 – Kinsey	5 – 3 Tied	3 – Taylor	Cam Henderson Center (5,489); Huntington, WV
Jan 9, 2020; 7:30 pm, ESPN+		at Middle Tennessee	W 79–75	8–8 (2–1)	17 – Bennett	11 – Bennett	7 – Kinsey	Murphy Center (2,703); Murfreesboro, TN
Jan 11, 2020; 8:00 pm, Stadium		at UAB	L 50–61	8–9 (2–2)	20 – Kinsey	6 – Bennett	2 – Tied	Bartow Arena (2,542); Birmingham, AL
Jan 16, 2020; 7:00 pm, ESPN+		Charlotte	L 75–77	8–10 (2–3)	29 – Kinsey	11 – Kinsey	5 – West	Cam Henderson Center (5,462); Huntington, WV
Jan 18, 2020; 7:00 pm, ESPN+		Old Dominion	W 68–67	9–10 (3–3)	18 – Kinsey	6 – 3 Tied	4 – Kinsey	Cam Henderson Center (6,445); Huntington, WV
Jan 22, 2020; 7:00 pm, Facebook		Western Kentucky	L 60–64	9–11 (3–4)	14 – Bennett	7 – Taylor	4 – Taylor	Cam Henderson Center (5,612); Huntington, WV
Jan 25, 2020; 7:30 pm, Facebook		at Western Kentucky	L 84–91	9–12 (3–5)	16 – Kinsey	6 – West	11 – West	E. A. Diddle Arena (6,270); Bowling Green, KY
Jan 30, 2020; 7:00 pm, ESPN+		at FIU	W 84–74	10–12 (4–5)	18 – Bennett	9 – Kinsey	8 – West	Ocean Bank Convocation Center (1,117); Miami, FL
Feb 1, 2020; 4:00 pm, ESPN+		at Florida Atlantic	L 73–91	10–13 (4–6)	25 – Taylor	8 – Bennett	4 – West	RoofClaim.com Arena (1,514); Boca Raton, FL
Feb 6, 2020; 7:00 pm, ESPN+		Southern Miss	W 72–58	11–13 (5–6)	18 – Bennett	12 – Bennett	6 – Kinsey	Cam Henderson Center (5,528); Huntington, WV
Feb 8, 2020; 7:00 pm, ESPN+		Louisiana Tech	W 83–79 ^{OT}	12–13 (6–6)	25 – West	8 – Kinsey	7 – West	Cam Henderson Center (6,531); Huntington, WV
Feb 13, 2020; 9:00 pm, CBSSN		at UTSA	L 63–72	12–14 (6–7)	27 – Kinsey	10 – West	5 – West	Convocation Center (1,282); San Antonio, TX
Feb 15, 2020; 4:00 pm, ESPN+		at UTEP	W 71–61	13–14 (7–7)	18 – Beyers	6 – Tied	8 – West	Don Haskins Center (4,424); El Paso, TX
Feb 22, 2020; 7:00 pm, ESPN3		Old Dominion	W 74–66	14–14 (8–7)	18 – West	13 – Williams	5 – West	Cam Henderson Center (5,916); Huntington, WV
Feb 27, 2020; 8:00 pm, ESPN3		at UAB	L 80–88	14–15 (8–8)	22 – Kinsey	6 – Bennett	7 – Kinsey	Bartow Arena (2,342); Birmingham, AL
Mar 4, 2020; 7:00 pm, Stadium		Florida Atlantic	W 94–82	15–15 (9–8)	20 – Kinsey	10 – Taylor	6 – Kinsey	Cam Henderson Center (5,426); Huntington, WV
Mar 7, 2020; 4:00 pm, Stadium		at UTSA	W 82–77	16–15 (10–8)	20 – Beyers	8 – George	7 – West	Convocation Center (402); San Antonio, TX
Conference USA tournament
Mar 11, 2020; 10:00 pm, ESPN+	(6)	vs. (11) UTEP; First round	W 86–78	17–15	26 – Kinsey	8 – Kinsey	5 – Tied	Ford Center at The Star (2,061); Frisco, TX
Mar 12, 2020; 9:00 pm, Facebook	(6)	vs. (3) Louisiana Tech; Quarterfinals	C-USA Tournament Canceled					Ford Center at The Star; Frisco, TX
*Non-conference game. ^{#}Rankings from AP Poll. (#) Tournament seedings in parentheses. All times are in Eastern Time.
