= Slak =

Slak may refer to:

== Places ==
- Slak, Chishminsky District, Republic of Bashkortostan, a village in Russia
- Slak, Alsheyevsky District, Republic of Bashkortostan, a rural locality in Russia

== People ==
=== Surname ===
- Franci Slak (1953–2007), Slovenian film director
- Grzegorz Ślak (born 1965), Polish businessman
- Hanna Slak (born 1975), Slovenian-Polish-German filmmaker
- Lojze Slak (1932–2011), Slovenian musician
- Mark Slak, American musician, drummer for Manda and the Marbles
- Žiga Slak (born 1991), Slovenian cyclist for Perutnina Ptuj (cycling team)

=== Nickname ===
- Francois van Wyk (born 1991; nicknamed "Slak"), South African rugby union player

=== Fictional characters ===
- Slak Sagar, a Star Wars character

== Other uses ==
- State Chamber of Physicians of Saxony (SLÄK; German: Sächsische Landesärztekammer)
- şlak, an onomatopoeia for a camera's click; see Cross-linguistic onomatopoeias

== See also ==
- Slack (disambiguation)
- SLAC (disambiguation)
