= Slack (surname) =

Slack is a surname. Notable people with the surname include:

== Politics, law and the military ==
- Clayton K. Slack (1896–1976), United States Army private awarded the Medal of Honor
- Doug Slack (born 1941), Australian former politician
- George Slack (1874–1950), American politician
- Granville Slack (1906–2003), British judge and politician
- James Slack, British political advisor and journalist, former official spokesperson and Director of Communications for former prime minister Boris Johnson
- James R. Slack (1818–1881), American state senator and Union Army brigadier general and brevet major general
- Jerald D. Slack (1936–2024), US Air National Guard major general
- John Slack (cricketer) (1930–2012), English cricketer and judge
- John Bamford Slack (1857–1909), British politician and Methodist lay preacher
- John M. Slack Jr. (1915–1980), American politician
- Leighton P. Slack (1867–1938), American state senator, lieutenant governor of Vermont and justice of the Vermont Supreme Court
- Lemuel Ertus Slack (1874–1952), American state senator and lawyer
- Thomas Kerr Slack (1875–1956), Canadian politician
- Timothy Slack (1913–1976), American politician
- William Y. Slack (1816–1862), American lawyer, politician and Confederate officer

== Science ==
- Adrian Slack (1933–2018), British landscape gardener, plantsman, author and authority on carnivorous plants
- Francis G. Slack (1897–1985), American physicist
- Harry Slack (1907–1982), British zoologist
- Nancy Guttmann Slack (1930–2022), American plant ecologist, bryologist and historian of science
- Roger Slack (1937–2016), British plant biologist and biochemist

== Sports ==
- Andrew Slack (born 1955), Australian rugby union player
- Bill Slack (born 1933), Canadian retired baseball pitcher, manager and coach, member of the Canadian Baseball Hall of Fame
- Bill Slack (footballer) (1906–1989), English footballer
- Charlie Slack (1931–2020), American college basketball player
- Henry James Slack (1818–1896), English journalist, liberal activist and science writer
- Hiram Slack (Nottinghamshire cricketer) (1808–1853)
- Hiram Slack (North of England cricketer) (1843–1918), nephew of the above
- Jackie Slack (born 1959), British former footballer
- John Slack (cricketer) (1930–2012), English cricketer and judge
- Laurie Slack (1915–1991), Australian rules footballer
- Mel Slack (1944–2016), English footballer
- Pres Slack (1908–1993), American National Basketball Association player
- Reggie Slack (born 1968), American former football quarterback
- Rodney Slack (born 1940), English former football goalkeeper
- Shanon Slack (born 1984), American mixed martial artist
- Stuart Slack (1935–1998), racing cyclist, musician and folk songwriter from the Isle of Man
- Trevor Slack (born 1962), English former footballer
- Wilf Slack (1954–1989), English cricketer

== Other ==
- Agnes Elizabeth Slack (1858–1946), English Temperance advocate
- Ben Slack, American actor, known for Bachelor Party
- Eliza Fraser (c. 1798–1858), née Slack, English shipwreck victim who claimed to have been captured by Australian Aborigines
- Freddie Slack (1910–1965), American swing and boogie-woogie pianist and bandleader
- Paul Slack (born 1943), British historian
- Samuel Slack (1757–1822), English bass singer
- William Slack (surgeon) (1925–2019), dean of UCL Medical School and Serjeant Surgeon to Queen Elizabeth II

== See also ==
- General Slack (disambiguation)
- Senator Slack (disambiguation)
