= Slack =

Slack most commonly refers to:

- Slack, the absence of tension in physics
- Slack (software), a team communication tool that can be used for collaboration

Slack or Slacks may also refer to:

== Places ==
- Slack, West Yorkshire, a village in Calderdale, England
- Slack (river), a river in Pas-de-Calais department, France
- The Slack, a village in County Durham, England
- Slacks Creek, Queensland, Australia, a suburb of Logan City

== Science and technology ==
- Slack (project management), the time that a task in a project network can be delayed without delaying subsequent tasks or the overall project
- Slack bus, an electrical power regulating system used to conduct load flow studies
- Slack tub, used by a blacksmith to quench hot metal
- Slack variable, a mathematical concept
- File slack, a kind of computer internal fragmentation

== People ==
- Slack (surname), a list of people

== Other uses ==
- Slacks, another name for trousers
- Slack Technologies, an American software company responsible for Slack software
- Slack Technologies, LLC v. Pirani, a U.S. Supreme Court securities law case
- Slack, the central belief of the parody religion Church of the SubGenius
- Slack, the valley or trough between dunes
- Slack action, free movement due to loose couplings between railway cars
- Slack coal, fragments of coal and coal dust; for example used in the Birchills Power Station
- Resource slack, the level of availability of a resource to a business

== See also ==
- SLAC (disambiguation)
- Slak (disambiguation)
- Slacker, a person who habitually avoids work or lacks work ethic
- Slackness (Jamaican music), a crude or bawdy subgenre of dancehall music
- Slackware, a Linux distribution
