= Taevion Kinsey =

American basketball player (born 2000)

No. 9 – Saint-Quentin
- Position: Shooting guard
- League: LNB Élite

Personal information
- Born: March 10, 2000 (age 26) Columbus, Ohio, U.S.
- Listed height: 6 ft 5 in (1.96 m)
- Listed weight: 190 lb (86 kg)

Career information
- High school: Eastmoor Academy (Columbus, Ohio)
- College: Marshall (2018–2023)
- NBA draft: 2023: undrafted
- Playing career: 2023–present

Career history
- 2023–2025: Salt Lake City Stars
- 2025: NBA G League United
- 2025–2026: Santa Cruz Warriors
- 2026–present: Saint-Quentin

Career highlights
- Sun Belt Player of the Year (2023); First-team All-Sun Belt (2023); First-team All-Conference USA (2021); 2× Second-team All-Conference USA (2020, 2022); Conference USA All-Freshman Team (2019)
- Stats at NBA.com
- Stats at Basketball Reference

Taevion Kinsey (born March 10, 2000) is an American professional basketball player for Saint-Quentin of the French LNB Élite. He played college basketball for the Marshall Thundering Herd, becoming the school's all-time leading scorer.

== Early life ==
Kinsey attended Eastmoor Academy in Columbus, Ohio. As a junior, he was named Division II District Player of the Year. In his senior season, Kinsey averaged 19.5 points per game, earning Division II All-State second team honors. He committed to playing college basketball for Marshall over offers from Kent State, Indiana State and UNC Asheville, among others.

== College career ==
On January 12, 2019, Kinsey scored a freshman season-high 23 points and seven rebounds in a 70–69 win over Western Kentucky. He led Marshall to the CollegeInsider.com Tournament championship, posting 21 points and 11 rebounds in a 90–70 victory over Green Bay in the title game on April 4. As a freshman, Kinsey averaged 10.5 points and four rebounds per game. He was a two-time Conference USA Freshman of the Week and was named to the All-Freshman Team. On November 21, Kinsey recorded 14 points and 14 assists in a 91–63 win over Howard. On January 16, 2020, he tallied a sophomore season-high 29 points and 11 rebounds in a 77–75 loss to Charlotte. He averaged 16.4 points, five rebounds and 4.2 assists per game as a sophomore, earning Second Team All-Conference USA honors. On December 3, 2020, Kinsey recorded a career-high 31 points and seven rebounds in an 80–64 victory over Wright State. He averaged 19.5 points, 6.2 rebounds and 3 assists per game during his junior season. Kinsey was hampered by a leg injury as a senior but was named to the Second Team All-Conference USA.

On November 17, 2022, Kinsey surpassed the 2,000 point milestone, scoring 14 points in a win over Miami (OH). At the conclusion of the regular season, he was named Sun Belt Conference Player of the Year. In a quarterfinal loss in the 2023 Sun Belt tournament, Kinsey became the all-time leading scorer in Marshall history, passing Jon Elmore.

== Professional career ==
After going undrafted in the 2023 NBA draft, Kinsey joined the Utah Jazz for the 2023 NBA Summer League. On August 30, 2023, he signed with the Jazz, but was waived on October 11. On October 30, he joined the Salt Lake City Stars.

On March 9, 2024, Kinsey signed a 10-day contract with the Utah Jazz, but was waived on March 12 without playing for them. The next day, he returned to the Stars.

On July 5, 2024, Kinsey signed a two-way contract with the Jazz, but was waived on August 12. On September 27, he re-signed with the Jazz, but was waived once again on October 8. On October 28, Kinsey rejoined the Stars.

For the 2025–26 season, Kinsey was added to the roster of the Golden State Warriors' NBA G League affiliate, the Santa Cruz Warriors.

On September 5, 2026, he signed with Saint-Quentin Basket-Ball of the French LNB Élite.

== Career statistics ==
Legend
GP	Games played	GS	Games started	MPG	Minutes per game
FG%	Field goal percentage	3P%	3-point field goal percentage	FT%	Free throw percentage
RPG	Rebounds per game	APG	Assists per game	SPG	Steals per game
BPG	Blocks per game	PPG	Points per game	**Bold**	Career high

=== College ===
Year	Team	GP	GS	MPG	FG%	3P%	FT%	RPG	APG	SPG	BPG	PPG
2018–19	Marshall	**37**	13	24.8	**.587**	.357	.667	4.0	1.3	.8	**.5**	10.5
2019–20	Marshall	32	**32**	36.0	.490	.264	.682	5.0	4.2	1.1	.4	16.4
2020–21	Marshall	22	22	37.7	.532	**.413**	**.818**	**6.2**	3.0	.8	.3	19.5
2021–22	Marshall	31	31	36.9	.429	.183	.745	5.1	4.2	1.0	.1	19.1
2022–23	Marshall	32	**32**	**37.8**	.556	.404	.744	4.9	**5.4**	**1.7**	**.5**	**22.1**
Career		154	130	34.1	.507	.302	.732	4.9	3.6	1.1	.4	17.1

== Personal life ==
Kinsey's older sister, Tajanee Wells, played college basketball for Ursuline College and Talladega College.
