= SLAC (disambiguation) =

SLAC most often refers to SLAC National Accelerator Laboratory, at Stanford University.

SLAC may also refer to:

- SLAC (basketball club), a Guinean basketball club
- SLAC National Accelerator Laboratory, Stanford Linear Accelerator Center
- Scapholunate advanced collapse, or SLAC Wrist, a type of wrist osteoarthritis
- SL Agritech Corporation, Philippine hybrid rice company
- Sri Lanka Armoured Corps
- Student Labor Action Coalition, activist network in the United States
- SLAC, an acronym meaning "small liberal arts college"

== See also ==
- Slack (disambiguation)
- Slak (disambiguation)
- SLAAC
