= Walt Walowac =

Former american basketball player

Personal information
- Born: May 27, 1932 Logan, West Virginia, U.S.
- Died: October 23, 2022 (aged 90) Salem, Virginia, U.S.
- Listed height: 5 ft 11 in (1.80 m)
- Listed weight: 170 lb (77 kg)

Career information
- High school: Logan (Logan, West Virginia)
- College: Marshall (1950–1954)
- NBA draft: 1954: 3rd round, 20th overall pick
- Drafted by: Milwaukee Hawks
- Position: Guard
- Number: 35, 20, 21

Career history
- 1955–1960: Akron Goodyear Wingfoots

Career highlights
- First-team All-MAC (1954); First-team All-OVC (1952); First-team Small College All-American (1953); Third-team Small College All-American (1954); 2× NIBL All-Star (1957, 1958); No. 20 retired by Marshall Thundering Herd
- Stats at Basketball Reference

Walter Joseph Walowac (May 27, 1932 – October 23, 2022) was an American professional basketball player from Logan, West Virginia.

== Career ==
Walowac was a two-time West Virginia All-State selection at Logan High School before joining then Marshall College in 1950. Over four seasons with the Thundering Herd (1950–1954), he averaged 20.9 points per game and totaled 1,982 career points, setting a school record that stood for 34 years, broken by Skip Henderson.

As a sophomore in 1952, Walowac was named first-team All-Ohio Valley Conference (OVC) and earned a spot on the OVC All-Tournament Team. During his junior year, he averaged 29.1 points per game—still the second-highest single-season mark in Marshall history, and was named a Helms Foundation first-team All-American.

In his senior season, as Marshall transitioned into the Mid-American Conference (MAC), he was eligible for All-MAC honors and earned first-team recognition while setting a conference scoring record with 26.1 points per game. That year, he also scored a career-high 44 points in games against both Ohio University and West Virginia Wesleyan. Within that season he finished sixth in the nation for total points.

Walowac was selected in the third round of the 1954 NBA draft by the Milwaukee Hawks but chose to play in the National Industrial Basketball League for the Akron Wingfoots, from 1955 to 1960, where he was twice named an All-Star. He was inducted into the West Virginia Sports Hall of Fame in 1980 and the Marshall Athletic Hall of Fame in 1985.

== Personal life ==
After his playing career, Walowac moved to Salem, Virginia and married June, having three daughters, June, Dixie, and Julie.
