= Skip Henderson =

American former basketball player (born 1965)

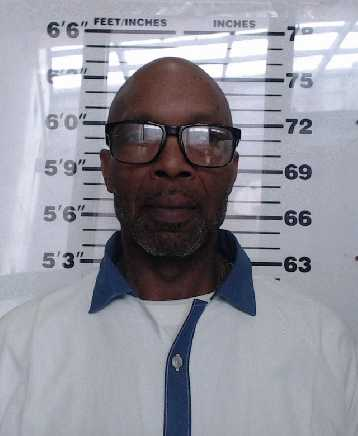
- Mugshot

Personal information
- Born: September 27, 1965 (age 61)
- Listed height: 6 ft 2 in (1.88 m)
- Listed weight: 175 lb (79 kg)

Career information
- High school: Cartersville (Cartersville, Georgia)
- College: Marshall (1984–1988)
- NBA draft: 1988: undrafted
- Position: Point guard

Career highlights
- AP honorable mention All-American (1988); SoCon Player of the Year (1988); 4× First-team All-SoCon (1985–1988); SoCon Freshman of the Year (1985); SoCon All-Freshmen Team (1985)

James Woodrow "Skip" Henderson Jr. (born September 27, 1965) is an American former basketball player known for his collegiate career at Marshall University between 1984–85 and 1987–88. Henderson, a 6'2" point guard, established himself as one of the premier players to ever play in the Southern Conference (SoCon), amassing a conference-record 2,574 points (eventually broken by Davidson's Stephen Curry 21 years later); this total was first on Marshall's all-time scoring record before being broken by Jon Elmore's 2,636 points. Henderson was a four-time first-team All-SoCon selection, and as a senior in 1987–88 he was named the SoCon Player of the Year.

== Early life ==
Henderson grew up in Cartersville, Georgia at a time when that town had "very little crime and very little drugs," according to Bobby Carr, his basketball coach at Cartersville High School. He described Henderson as an "All-American kid" who was voted as Mr. Cartersville High School by his peers. In high school, Henderson played quarterback for the football team, point guard for the basketball team and also played baseball in the spring.

== Marshall University ==
Henderson enrolled at Marshall University, then a member of NCAA Division I's Southern Conference, in the fall of 1984 to play for the Thundering Herd men's basketball team. On the court, Henderson was one of the best players in the league for the duration of his four-year career. He led Marshall to three postseason tournaments: the 1985 and 1987 NCAA Tournaments as well as the 1988 National Invitation Tournament (NIT). The Thundering Herd were twice SoCon regular season champions (1986–87 and 1987–88) and twice SoCon tournament champions (1984–85 and 1986–87). Henderson led the team in points per game in each of his four seasons, and in his final three seasons he also led them in steals. During his sophomore season in 1985–86, he was Marshall's team leader in assists. He rewrote the school record books, among them is the still-standing records for points in a game (55). His career total stood for 21 years as the SoCon mark until Stephen Curry broke it in 2008–09. Additionally, his 55-point game was played in the quarterfinals of the 1988 Southern Conference tournament against The Citadel. This set both the Marshall and conference tournament records simultaneously. He was named the SoCon Player of the Year as a senior.

== Troubled post-college life ==
Off the basketball court, Henderson began to smoke marijuana and drink alcohol. Eventually his addictions grew, and by his senior year he was trying cocaine and crack. Besides drug use, Henderson made other poor decisions, such as deciding to drop out of Marshall—just two months before he was set to earn his bachelor's degree in Sports Management—in order to play in the United States Basketball League for the New Haven Skyhawks. Henderson was then selected third overall by the Charleston Gunners of the Continental Basketball Association (CBA) in the 1988 CBA Draft, but two days before the season's opening game, the CBA suspended Henderson for testing positive for cocaine use. This suspension was, ironically, right before the "Say No to Drugs"-themed season opener.

Other transgressions outside of basketball led Henderson to numerous run-ins with the law. He pleaded guilty to one count of burglary and four counts of forgery in January 1991, and one count of robbery by intimidation and one count of first-degree forgery in March 1992.

On September 24, 2001, Henderson hijacked a car at gunpoint, kidnapped the driver for a brief amount of time, robbed a convenience store for petty cash ($360 in total), and threatened the store clerk with the gun. This night was fueled by drug use. Henderson said that his wife had just died and it was an emotionally turbulent time for him, which is why he got back into drugs. The crimes he committed that evening landed him in prison, and since he was a repeat offender, Henderson was given life without parole. Though a movement to have him released from prison has since been started.

== College accolades ==
Honors and awards

- 4× First Team All-SoCon (1985–1988)
- SoCon Player of the Year (1988)
- Associated Press Honorable Mention All-American (1988)
- 3× All-SoCon tournament First Team (1985, 1987–1988)
- All-SoCon Tournament Second Team (1986)
- SoCon All-Freshmen Team (1985)
- SoCon Freshman of the Year (1985)
- 4× team's scoring leader (1985–1988)
- 3× team's steals leader (1986–1988)
- Team's assists leader (1986)
- 4× team's field goals made leader (1985–1988)
- 2× team's three-point field goals made leader (1987–1988)
- 4× team's free throws made leader (1985–1988)
- 2× SoCon Tournament champion (1985, 1987)
- 2× SoCon regular season champion (1987, 1988)

School records

- Points in a game (55),.
- Field goals made in a season (291) and career (1,000)
- Tied for second-most field goals made in a game (20, with George Stone)
- Field goals made in a game in the Cam Henderson Center (17)
- Second-most field goals attempted in a career (1,964)
- Steals in a career (208)
- Fourth-most free throws made (441) and attempted (625) in a career
- Tied for most SoCon Player of the Week Awards in a career (8, with John Taft)

Conference records

- Held all-time Southern Conference career scoring record from 1988 until 2009
- SoCon Tournament points in a game (55)

Sources for awards and records
