= Andy Tonkovich =

American basketball player (1922–2006)

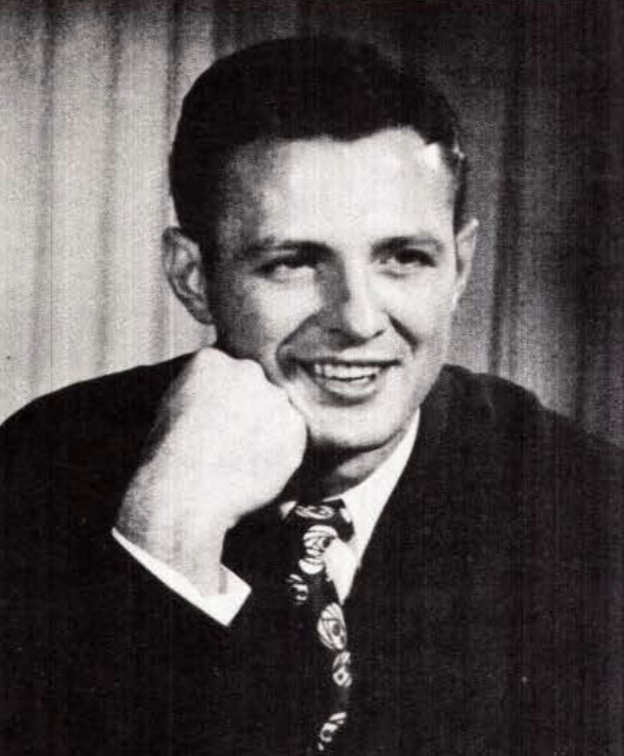
- Tonkovich as a senior at Marshall

Personal information
- Born: November 1, 1922 Wheeling, West Virginia, U.S.
- Died: September 2, 2006 (aged 83) Inverness, Florida, U.S.
- Listed height: 6 ft 1 in (1.85 m)
- Listed weight: 185 lb (84 kg)

Career information
- High school: Union (Benwood, West Virginia)
- College: Marshall (1944–1948)
- BAA draft: 1948: 1st round, 1st overall pick
- Drafted by: Providence Steamrollers
- Playing career: 1948–1952
- Position: Point guard
- Number: 7

Career history

Playing
- 1948: Providence Steamrollers
- 1949–1952: Wheeling Blues

Coaching
- 1949–1952: Wheeling Blues
- 1952–1954: St. John Central HS

Career highlights
- Third-team All-American – Helms (1948)

Career BAA statistics
- Points: 44 (2.6 ppg)
- Assists: 10 (0.6 apg)
- Games played: 17
- Stats at NBA.com
- Stats at Basketball Reference

Andrew Edward Tonkovich (November 1, 1922 – September 2, 2006) was an American professional basketball player and coach. He was selected as the first overall pick in the 1948 BAA draft by the Providence Steamrollers. He played college basketball for the Marshall Thundering Herd.

== Basketball career ==
=== College career ===
Tonkovich led the Thundering Herd as team captain to the NAIB championship in 1947. He was named to the All-Tournament team and the NAIB All-American first-team. Tonkovich scored 1,578 points for the Thundering Herd, which was a record for the program at the time.

=== Professional career ===
After his college career, he was selected as the first overall pick in the 1948 BAA draft by the Providence Steamrollers.

Tonkovich played 17 games for the Steamrollers during the 1948–49 BAA season. He left the team midseason and signed with the Wheeling Blues of the All-American Basketball League as a player-coach.

== After Basketball ==
After his playing retirement, Tonkovich became a high school coach and physical education teacher in West Virginia and Florida. He served as the basketball coach at St. John Central High School in Bellaire, Ohio, from 1952 to 1954. From 1955-1963 Tonkovich served as the head basketball coach and later baseball coach at Parkersburg (West Virginia) Catholic High School. In 1957 and 1958 his basketball teams posted back to back perfect seasons with 41 consecutive regular season victories and a conference championship in 1957. On January 22,1957 Parkersburg Catholic played in the first televised high school basketball game in West Virginia. Tonkovich, who was in the hospital at the time, directed his team via telephone while watching the game from his hospital bed. In 1963, Tonkovich moved to Chaminade-Madonna High School in Hollywood, Florida where he served as athletic director and coached basketball, baseball, football and tennis for 21 years. Tonkovich was inducted into the NAIA Hall of Fame in 1973 and the Marshall Athletic Hall of Fame in 1985. Tonkovich was posthumously elected to the Ohio Valley Athletic Conference Hall of Fame in 2014. Tonkovich died September 2, 2006 in Inverness, Florida.

== Career statistics ==
=== BAA ===
==== Regular season ====
Year	Team	GP	FG%	FT%	APG	PPG
1948–49	Providence	17	.268	.667	.6	2.6
