= General Slack =

General Slack may refer to:

- James R. Slack (1818–1881), Union Army brigadier general and brevet major general
- Jerald D. Slack (born 1936), U.S. Air National Guard major general
- William Y. Slack (1816–1862), Missouri State Guard brigadier general in the American Civil War
