= Greg White (basketball) =

American basketball coach

Biographical details
- Born: March 31, 1959 (age 67); Mullens, West Virginia, U.S.
- Education: Marshall University

Playing career
- 1977–1981: Marshall

Coaching career (HC unless noted)
- 1981–1982: Marshall (student assistant)
- 1984–1989: University of Pikeville
- 1989–1990: Marshall (assistant)
- 1990–1995: University of Charleston
- 1995–1996: UCLA (assistant)
- 1996–2003: Marshall
- 2003–2010: University of Charleston

Head coaching record
- Overall: 115–84 (.578) (Division I)
- Tournaments: 0–0

Accomplishments and honors

Championships
- 1 Southern Conference regular season (1997)

Awards
- WVIAC Coach of the Year (1992); Southern Conference Coach of the Year (1997)

Greg White (born March 31, 1959) is an American basketball coach, the head coach at Marshall University and an assistant coach for the UCLA Bruins. He is also a motivational speaker at universities and businesses.

He graduated from the (now closed) Mullens High School in Mullens, WV and went on to play at NCAA Division I Marshall University, where he is a member of the school's Hall of Fame. He was a record setting point guard, starting 113 consecutive games from 1977 to 1981. His teams amassed an 87–17 home record in Marshall's Veterans Memorial Arena. Additionally, his teams at Marshall had a record setting 27 game home win streak and were 34–3 in home games against non conference teams. In 2002, Greg's Marshall team lead all Division I basketball teams in 3 point field goal shooting percentage at 44% and he had 18 all conference players during his time as Marshall's head coach.

He has written several books including The Winning Edge and Success: Attitude is Everything.. His basketball camps attracted over 1000 attendees per summer at their peak.

== Head coaching record ==
Record table
Season	Team	Overall	Conference	Standing	Postseason
Pikeville Bears (Independent) (1984–1989)
1984–85	Pikeville	5–19			
1985–86	Pikeville	12–16			
1986–87	Pikeville	21–10			
1987–88	Pikeville	5–22			
1988–89	Pikeville	4–22			
Pikeville:		47–89 (.346)			
Charleston Golden Eagles (West Virginia Intercollegiate Athletic Conference) (1990–1995)
1990–91	Charleston	10–18	6–12	11th	
1991–92	Charleston	21–9	15–3	1st	NAIA Division I First Round
1992–93	Charleston	14–16	9–10	7th	NAIA District 28 Playoffs
1993–94	Charleston	10–13	8–9	10th	
1994–95	Charleston	13–14	8–9	8th	
Marshall Thundering Herd (Southern Conference) (1996–1997)
1996–97	Marshall	20–9	10–4	T–1st (North)	
Marshall Thundering Herd (Mid-American Conference) (1997–2003)
1997–98	Marshall	11–16	7–11	T–3rd (East)	
1998–99	Marshall	16–11	11–7	6th (East)	
1999–00	Marshall	21–9	11–7	T–3rd (East)	
2000–01	Marshall	18–9	12–6	T–2nd (East)	
2001–02	Marshall	15–15	8–10	5th (East)	
2002–03	Marshall	14–15	9–9	T–3rd (East)	
Marshall:		115–84 (.578)	68–54 (.557)		
Charleston Golden Eagles (West Virginia Intercollegiate Athletic Conference) (2003–2010)
2003–04	Charleston	20–10	11–7	5th	
2004–05	Charleston	20–9	12–6	4th	
2005–06	Charleston	18–11	11–7	8th	
2006–07	Charleston	15–14	9–9	T–8th	
2007–08	Charleston	19–10	12–8	5th	
2008–09	Charleston	13–15	8–12	11th	
2009–10	Charleston	19–11	15–7	5th	
Charleston:		192–150 (.561)	124–99 (.556)		
Total:		354–323 (.523)			
National champion Postseason invitational champion Conference regular season champion Conference regular season and conference tournament champion Division regular season champion Division regular season and conference tournament champion Conference tournament champion
