= Slak, Chishminsky District, Republic of Bashkortostan =

Slak Слак
- Village
- Location within Bashkortostan Location within Russia
- Coordinates: 54°36′N 55°08′E
- Country: Russia
- Region: Bashkortostan
- District: Chishminsky District
- Time zone: UTC+5:00

Slak (Russian: Слак; Bashkir: Ыҫлаҡ, Iślaq) is a rural locality (a village) in Yeremeyevsky Selsoviet, Chishminsky District, Bashkortostan, Russia. The population was 111 as of 2010. There is 1 street.

== Geography ==
Slak is located 18 km west of Chishmy (the district's administrative centre) by road. Bashterma is the nearest rural locality.
