= Slak, Alsheyevsky District, Republic of Bashkortostan =

Slak Слак
- Selo
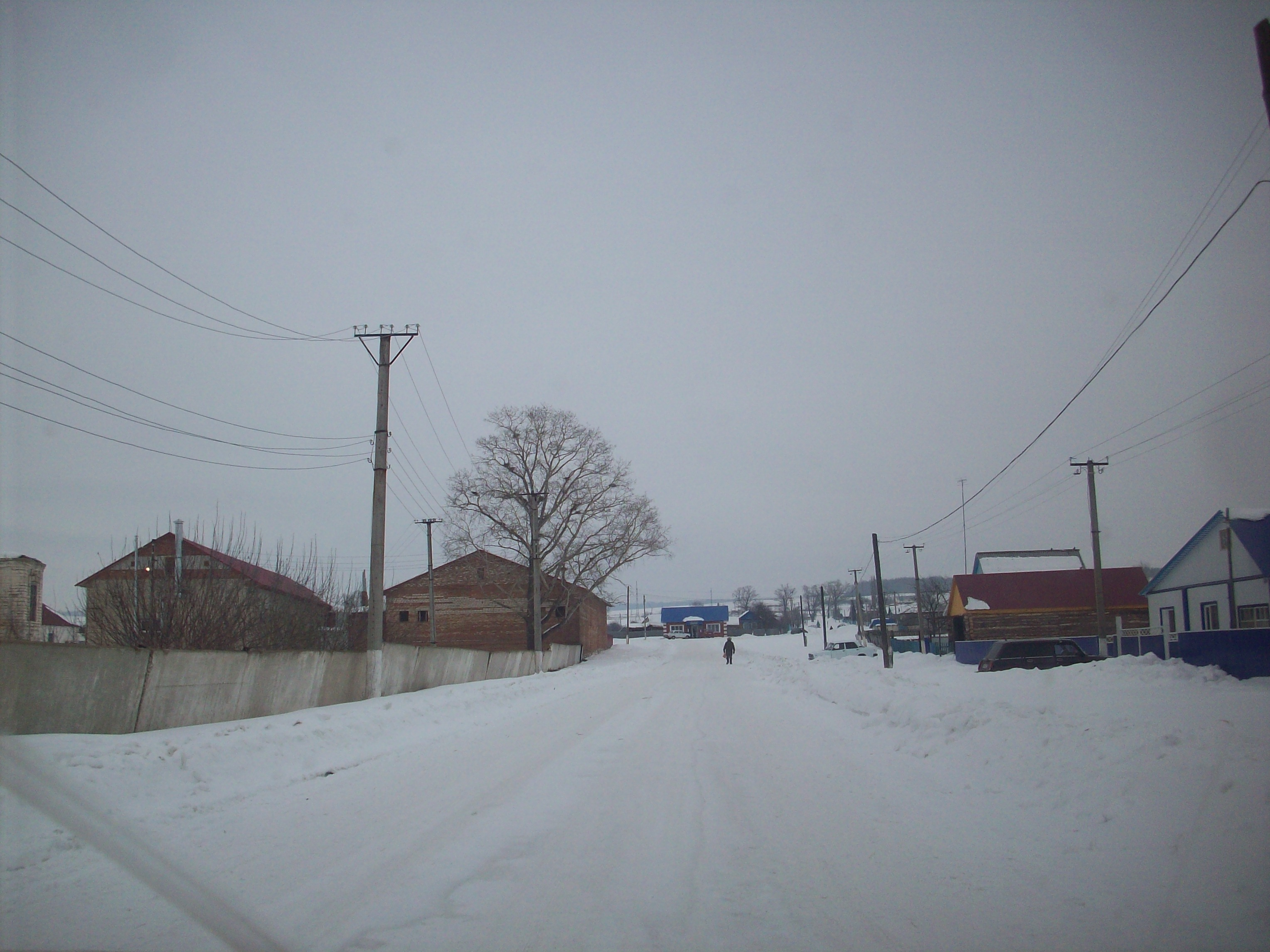

- Location within Bashkortostan Location within Russia
- Coordinates: 53°50′N 54°31′E
- Country: Russia
- Region: Bashkortostan
- District: Alsheyevsky District
- Time zone: UTC+5:00

Slak (Russian: Слак; Bashkir: Ыҫлаҡ, Iślaq) is a rural locality (a selo) in Alsheyevsky District, Bashkortostan, Russia. The population was 956 as of 2010. There are 15 streets.

== Geography ==
Slak is located 22 km southwest of Rayevsky (the district's administrative centre) by road. Shafranovo is the nearest rural locality.
