= Senator Slack =

Senator Slack may refer to:

- James R. Slack (1818–1881), Indiana State Senate
- Leighton P. Slack (1867–1938), Vermont State Senate
- Lemuel Ertus Slack (1874–1952), Indiana State Senate
