= Ajdin Penava =

Bosnian basketball player (born 1997)

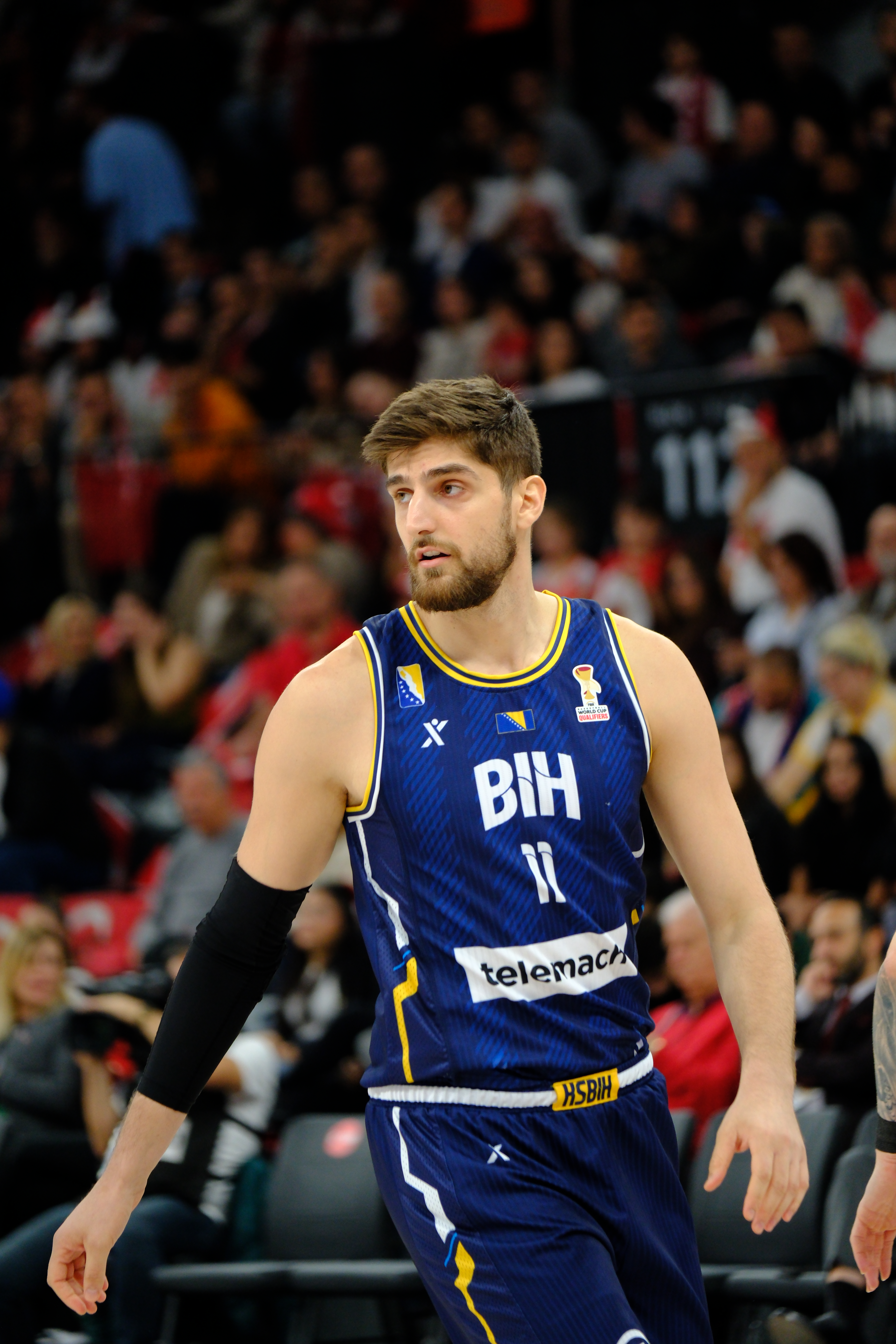
- Penava with Bosnia and Herzegovina in 2025

No. 11 – Śląsk Wrocław
- Position: Power forward
- League: PLK

Personal information
- Born: 11 March 1997 (age 29) Sarajevo, Bosnia and Herzegovina
- Listed height: 6 ft 9 in (2.06 m)
- Listed weight: 220 lb (100 kg)

Career information
- College: Marshall (2015–2018)
- NBA draft: 2018: undrafted
- Playing career: 2018–present

Career history
- 2018–2020: Baskonia
- 2019–2020: → Baskonia B
- 2020–2022: Belfius Mons-Hainaut
- 2022–2023: Spójnia Stargard
- 2023–2024: Juventus Utena
- 2024–present: Śląsk Wrocław

Career highlights
- NCAA blocks leader (2018); Third-team All-C-USA (2018); C-USA Defensive Player of the Year (2018); First-team All-C-USA Defensive Team (2018)

Ajdin Penava (born 11 March 1997) is a Bosnian professional basketball player for Śląsk Wrocław of the Polish Basketball League (PLK). He played college basketball for Marshall University in the Conference USA (C-USA). He led NCAA Division I in blocks per game (3.94) in 2017–18.

== Early life ==
Penava attended Peta Gimnazija in Sarajevo, Bosnia and Herzegovina.

== College career ==
Penava was a reserve player during his first two seasons with the Herd. He had his breakout season as a junior when he became a full-time starter. One of his best games came against the Ohio Bobcats where he had 33 points, 15 rebounds, and 9 blocks in a 99–96 win. He would later help lead Marshall to an upset win against Wichita State in the 2018 NCAA tournament scoring 16 points, grabbing 8 rebounds, and blocking 3 shots. Penava led the nation in blocks during 2017–18 season and decided to declare for the 2018 NBA draft at season's end. He initially did not sign with an agent, but decided to do so on April 19. He did not return to Marshall for his senior season.

== Professional career ==
On 2 September 2018, Penava signed a four-year deal with Kirolbet Baskonia of the Liga ACB and the EuroLeague. On 26 February 2019, Penava joined to the Baskonia reserve team. On 6 July 2020, Penava signed with Belfius Mons-Hainaut of the Pro Basketball League. In July 2021, Penava extended his contract with two more years until 2023.

On 27 December 2022, he signed with Spójnia Stargard of the Polish Basketball League (PLK).

On 27 September 2023, Penava signed a one-year deal with Juventus Utena of the Lithuanian Basketball League (LKL).

On July 18, 2024, he signed with Śląsk Wrocław of the Polish Basketball League.

== National team career ==
Penava played for the Bosnian national team during the 2015 FIBA Europe Under-18 Championship. Penava averaged 5.6 ppg and 4.8 rpg during the tournament.

== Career statistics ==
Legend
GP	Games played	GS	Games started	MPG	Minutes per game
FG%	Field goal percentage	3P%	3-point field goal percentage	FT%	Free throw percentage
RPG	Rebounds per game	APG	Assists per game	SPG	Steals per game
BPG	Blocks per game	PPG	Points per game	**Bold**	Career high

Year	Team	GP	GS	MPG	FG%	3P%	FT%	RPG	APG	SPG	BPG	PPG
2015–16	Marshall	18	1	6.1	.387	.143	.692	1.0	.3	.1	.4	1.9
2016–17	Marshall	**35**	14	15.5	.517	.225	**.781**	3.9	.5	.4	1.1	6.1
2017–18	Marshall	34	**34**	**29.4**	**.562**	**.340**	.753	**8.5**	**1.9**	**.9**	**3.9**	**15.6**
Career		87	49	19.0	.538	.291	.758	5.1	1.0	.6	2.1	9.0
