= Nigel Spikes =

American basketball player (born 1989)

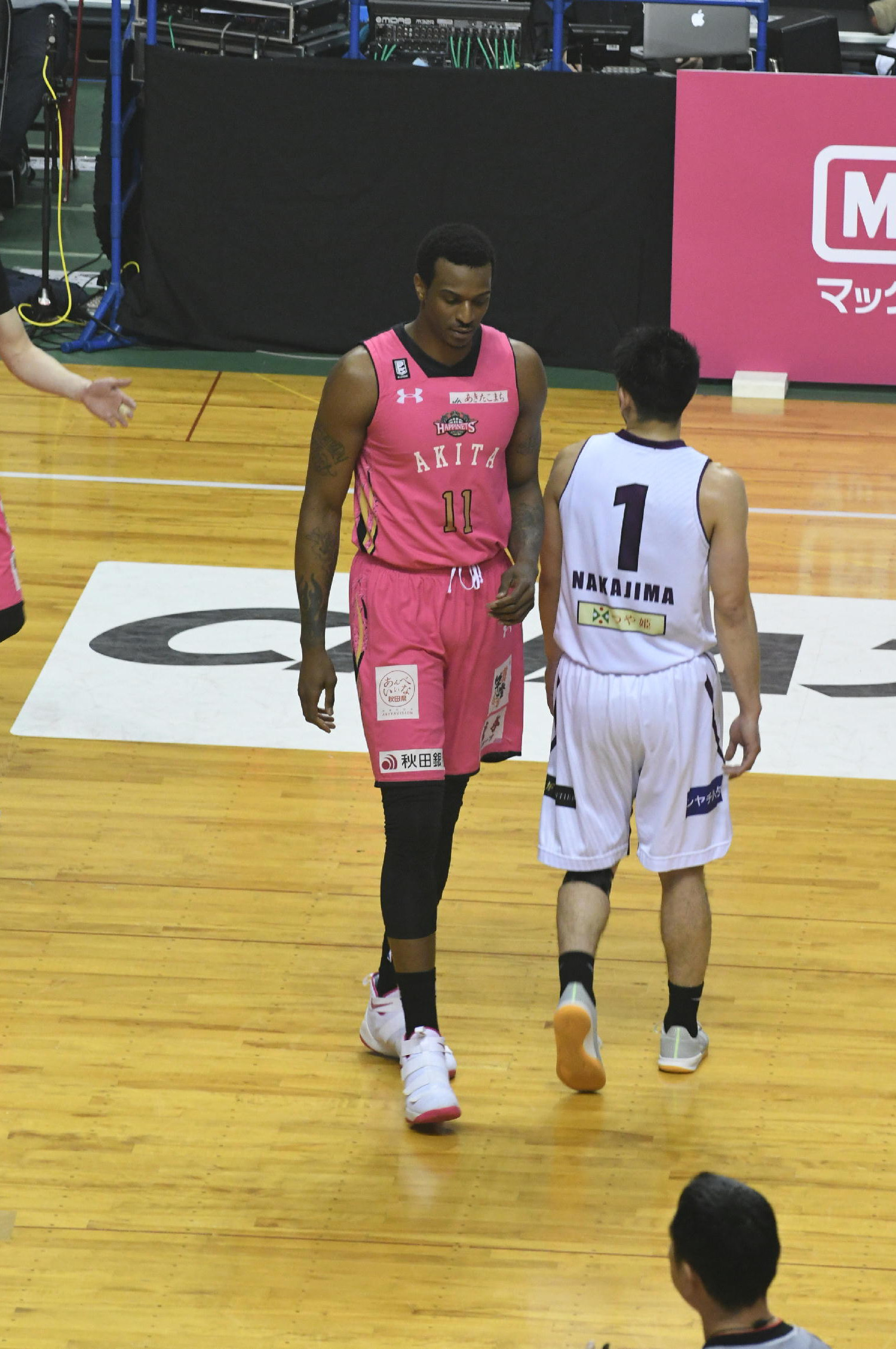
- Spikes in 2018

No. 6 – Ehime Orange Vikings
- Position: Power forward / center
- League: B.League

Personal information
- Born: October 18, 1989 (age 37) Fort Lauderdale, Florida, U.S.
- Listed height: 6 ft 10 in (2.08 m)
- Listed weight: 229 lb (104 kg)

Career information
- High school: Dillard (Fort Lauderdale, Florida )
- College: Marshall (2009–2013)
- NBA draft: 2013: undrafted
- Playing career: 2013–present

Career history
- 2014: Miami Midnites
- 2014: Piratas de Vargas
- 2015: Manzaneros de Cuauhtemoc
- 2015: Halifax Rainmen
- 2015–2016: Sioux Falls Skyforce
- 2016: Wellington Saints
- 2016–2017: Fukushima Firebonds
- 2017–2018: Akita Northern Happinets
- 2018–2019: Earthfriends Tokyo Z
- 2019–2020: Tryhoop Okayama
- 2020–2021: Rizing Zephyr Fukuoka
- 2021–2022: Aisin Areions
- 2022: Al-Hala SC
- 2023: Toyama Grouses
- 2023: Kagawa Five Arrows
- 2023: Soles de Santo Domingo Este
- 2023–2024: Kobe Storks
- 2024–present: Ehime Orange Vikings

Career highlights
- NBA D-League champion (2016); 2× FBA champion (2014, 2015)

Nigel Spikes (born October 18, 1989) is an American professional basketball player who plays for Ehime Orange Vikings of the Japanese B.League. He played college basketball for the Marshall Thundering Herd before playing professionally in Venezuela, Mexico, Canada, New Zealand and Japan. He has also played in the Florida Basketball Association and the NBA Development League.

Spikes survived a heart attack in 2013.

== Gallery ==
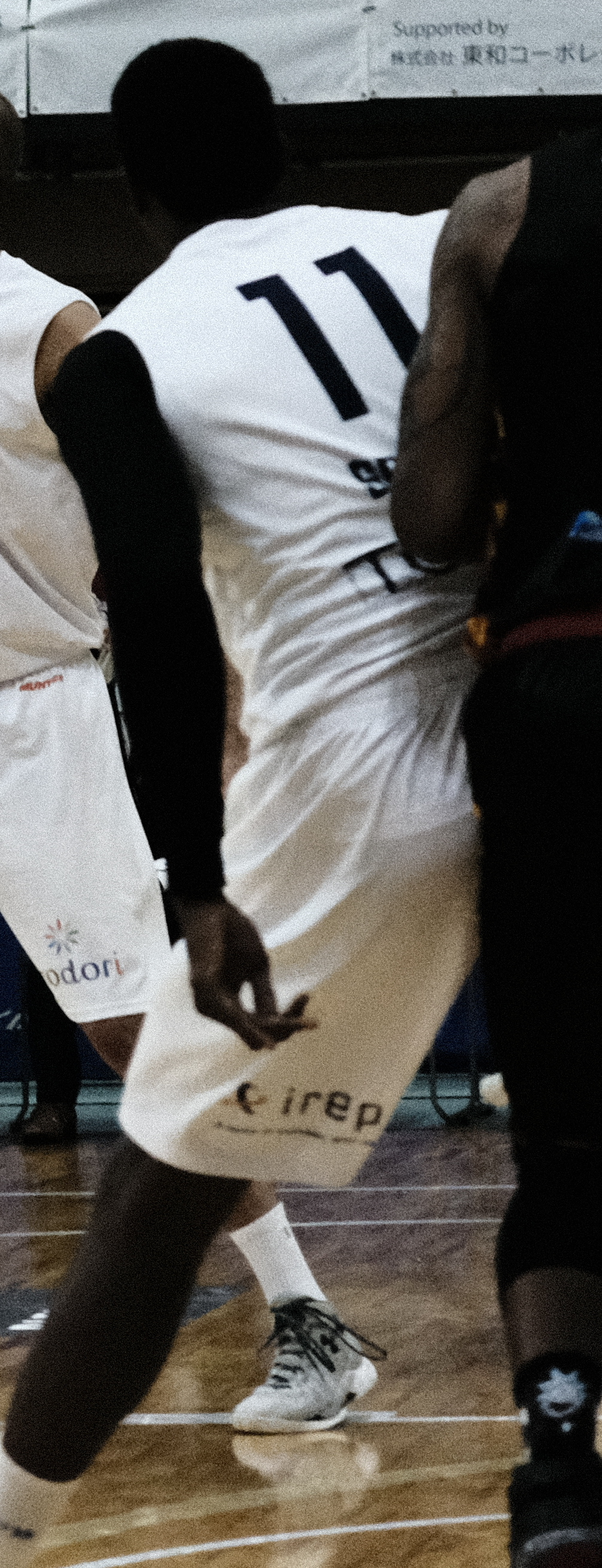

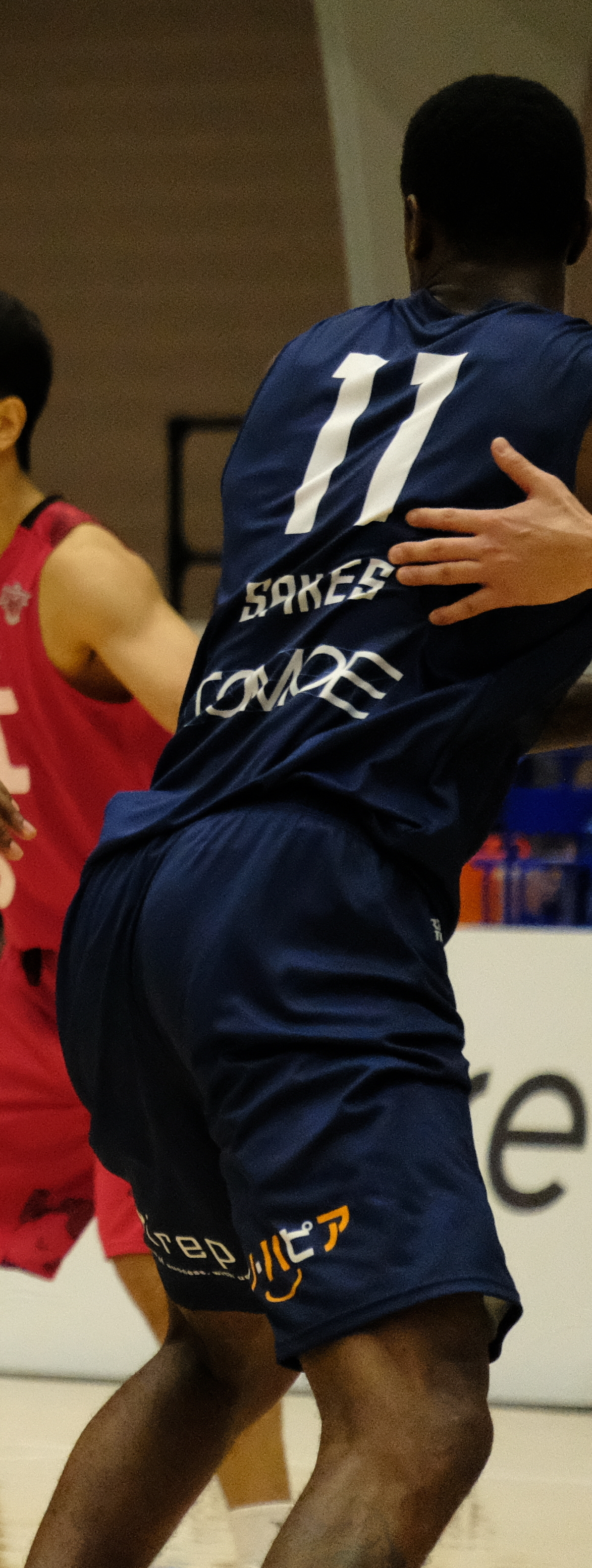

== College statistics ==
Year	Team	GP	GS	MPG	FG%	3P%	FT%	RPG	APG	SPG	BPG	PPG
2009–10	Marshall	29	1	8.4	.575	.000	.515	2.3	0.2	0.2	0.3	2.2
2010–11	Marshall	32	32	20.3	.554	.000	.505	5.9	0.3	0.4	1.0	5.1
2011–12	Marshall	29	0	16.7	.523	.000	.549	4.8	0.2	0.7	0.8	4.1
2012–13	Marshall	32	31	24.8	.468	.000	.520	7.3	0.6	0.7	1.9	5.7
Career		122	64	17.8	.518	.000	.519	5.2	0.3	0.5	1.0	4.3

== Career statistics ==
Legend
GP	Games played	GS	Games started	MPG	Minutes per game
FG%	Field goal percentage	3P%	3-point field goal percentage	FT%	Free throw percentage
RPG	Rebounds per game	APG	Assists per game	SPG	Steals per game
BPG	Blocks per game	PPG	Points per game	**Bold**	Career high

†	Denotes seasons in which Spikes won an championship

=== Regular season ===
Year	Team	GP	GS	MPG	FG%	3P%	FT%	RPG	APG	SPG	BPG	PPG
2014–15	Halifax Rainmen	18	2	16.1	.560	.000	.639	5.00	0.28	0.50	1.56	7.78
2015–16†	Sioux Falls Skyforce	39	0	11.1	.604	.500	.467	3.08	0.51	0.28	1.08	4.54
2015–16	Wellington Saints	1	0	11.5	.000	.000	.000	2.00	0.00	0.00	0.00	0.00
2016–17	Fukushima Firebonds	56	56	22.9	.505	.231	.556	9.9	1.1	1.4	1.8	12.6
2017–18	Akita Happinets	58	21	17.9	.600	.333	.409	7.0	1.1	1.2	0.8	8.6
2018–19	Tokyo Z	37	37	29.42	.524	.500	.572	11.6	2.2	1.62	1.97	14.1
2019–20	Okayama	19	19	33.5	.570	.286	.572	13.2	2.3	1.7	1.8	21.2

=== Playoffs ===
Year	Team	GP	GS	MPG	FG%	3P%	FT%	RPG	APG	SPG	BPG	PPG
2014–15	Halifax	9		15.3	.500	.000	.667	5.0	0.3	0.6	1.3	7.1
2015–16	Sioux Falls	3		6.3	.500	.000	.000	0.7	0.3	0.0	0.7	1.3
2017–18	Akita	5	2	15.37	.579	.000	.846	5.8	0.8	0.6	1.0	6.6

=== Early cup games ===
Year	Team	GP	GS	MPG	FG%	3P%	FT%	RPG	APG	SPG	BPG	PPG
2017	Akita	2	1	17.23	.750	.000	.286	7.5	0.5	1.5	1.5	10.0
2018	Tokyo Z	2	1	27.01	.455	.000	.600	13.0	1.0	0.5	1	13.0
