= Jarrod West =

American basketball player

No. 23 – Cholet Basket
- Position: Point guard
- League: LNB Élite; Champions League

Personal information
- Born: March 29, 1999 (age 27) Clarksburg, West Virginia, U.S.
- Listed height: 5 ft 11 in (1.80 m)
- Listed weight: 180 lb (82 kg)

Career information
- High school: Notre Dame (Clarksburg, West Virginia)
- College: Marshall (2017–2021); Louisville (2021–2022)
- NBA draft: 2023: undrafted
- Playing career: 2022–present

Career history
- 2022: Nelson Giants
- 2022: Fujian Sturgeons
- 2022–2023: Medi Bayreuth
- 2023: ASK Karditsas
- 2023–2024: Borac Banja Luka
- 2024–2026: Bosna
- 2026–present: Cholet

Career highlights
- Bill Evans Award (2017); ABA League Second Division Playoffs MVP (2025)

Jarrod Lenard West II (born March 29, 1999) is an American professional basketball player for Cholet of the LNB Élite. He played college basketball for Marshall and Louisville. West earned MVP honours in the 2024–25 ABA League Second Division playoffs, helping Bosna secure promotion to the top‑tier ABA League. He played overseas for the majority of his career, competing in New Zealand, China, Germany, Greece, and Bosnia and Herzegovina.

== Early life and college career ==
West attended Notre Dame High School in Clarksburg, West Virginia, and led his team to the state Class A championship in 2017, earning the Bill Evans Award as the state’s top prep player. He played four seasons at Marshall University, where he recorded over 1,200 points and set a school record with 254 career steals—ranking second in Conference USA history. He led the conference in assists (6.0) and steals (2.5) during the 2020–21 season and was named to the All‑Conference USA Second Team and All‑Defensive Team. West used an additional year of eligibility and played as a graduate transfer for the Louisville Cardinals in 2021–22.

== Professional career ==
West began his pro career with the Nelson Giants in New Zealand's NBL, where he averaged 17.6 points, 7.4 assists, and 2.8 steals per game in 2021–22.

In 2022–23 he played for Fujian Sturgeons (CBA, China), Medi Bayreuth (Germany), and ASK Karditsas (Greece).

He went undrafted in the 2023 NBA draft.

In 2023–24 he played for Borac Banja Luka in Bosnia and Herzegovina, posting 15.4 points, 4.4 rebounds, 4.4 assists, and 1.8 steals per game.

For the 2024–25 season he joined KK Bosna Royal, then known as Bosna Meridianbet, later Bosna Visit Sarajevo, and now known as KK Bosna BH Telecom for sponsorship reasons, averaging 9.3 points, 4.0 assists, 2.6 rebounds, and 1.9 steals over 28 games in the Bosnian Division I and competing in ABA League 2. He subsequently signed a contract extension to remain with the club for the following season.
