= Cornelius Jackson =

American basketball player and coach (born 1978)

Current position
- Title: Head coach
- Team: Marshall
- Conference: Sun Belt
- Record: 39–26 (.600)
- Annual salary: $350,000

Biographical details
- Born: January 28, 1978 (age 48); Beckley, West Virginia, U.S.

Playing career
- 1996–1997: Tennessee
- 1998–2001: Marshall
- Position: Guard

Coaching career (HC unless noted)
- 2003–2009: West Virginia State (assistant)
- 2009–2013: UT Martin (assistant)
- 2013–2017: Cleveland State (assistant)
- 2017–2023: Marshall (assistant)
- 2023–2024: Marshall (Associate HC)
- 2024–present: Marshall

Head coaching record
- Overall: 39–26 (.600)

Accomplishments and honors

Awards
- Bill Evans Award (1996)

Cornelius "Corny" Jackson (born January 28, 1978) is an American basketball coach and former player who is serving as head coach for the Marshall Thundering Herd men's basketball team.

== Playing career ==
Jackson played high school basketball at Oak Hill High School in Oak Hill, West Virginia where he won the Bill Evans Award as the West Virginia High School Player of the Year in 1996. Jackson originally committed to play college basketball at Tennessee but transferred to Marshall after his freshman year. Jackson was the starting point guard and team captain for three years between 1998 and 2001 with the Thundering Herd. Jackson had career averages of 10.2 points and 6.2 assists at Marshall. He finished his career ranked 4th all-time in career assists at Marshall.

Following graduation, Jackson was drafted by the Roanoke Dazzle in the 8th Round of the 2001 National Basketball Development League (the precursor to the G League). Jackson would never appear in a game for the Dazzle, instead opting to play overseas in Germany and Austria for two years.

== Coaching career ==
After playing professional basketball in Germany and Austria, Jackson was an assistant coach with West Virginia State and UT Martin before being hired as an assistant coach at Cleveland State in 2013 under head coach, Gary Waters. In 2017, Jackson returned to Marshall as an assistant under Dan D'Antoni. In 2023, he was promoted to associate head coach for The Herd.

On March 25, 2024, it was announced that he would replace Dan D'Antoni as head coach at Marshall.

== Head coaching record ==
Record table
Season	Team	Overall	Conference	Standing	Postseason
Marshall Thundering Herd (Sun Belt Conference) (2024–present)
2024–25	Marshall	20–13	12–6	5th	
2025–26	Marshall	19–13	11–7	T–2nd	
2026–27	Marshall	0–0	0–0		
Marshall:		39–26 (.600)	23–13 (.639)		
Total:		39–26 (.600)			
National champion Postseason invitational champion Conference regular season champion Conference regular season and conference tournament champion Division regular season champion Division regular season and conference tournament champion Conference tournament champion
