= John Taft (basketball) =

American basketball player (born 1968)

Personal information
- Born: April 4, 1968 (age 58) Huntsville, Alabama, U.S.
- Listed height: 6 ft 2 in (1.88 m)

Career information
- High school: Huntsville (Huntsville, Alabama)
- College: Marshall (1988–1991)
- Position: Guard

Career history
- 1991: San Miguel Beermen
- 1992–1993: Valur
- 1998–1999: Ironi Ashkelon

Career highlights
- Icelandic All-Star (1993); 2× SoCon Player of the Year (1989, 1990); 3× First-team All-SoCon (1989–1991); No. 22 retired by Marshall Thundering Herd

John Taft (born April 4, 1968) is an American former professional basketball player. Taft played his college basketball career at Marshall University where he was All-Southern Conference and twice was the Southern Conference Men's Basketball Player of the Year. After his career at Marshall, Taft went overseas to play professional basketball in Iceland, Cyprus, Philippines, and Israel. In Israel, Taft played for Ironi Ashkelon.

== Professional career ==
In December 1992, Taft signed with Valur of the Icelandic Úrvalsdeild karla. In his debut with Valur, he scored 45 points in a narrow loss against Snæfell in the Icelandic Cup. In February 1993, he was selected to the Icelandic All-Star game where he scored 32 points. For the season, he averaged 26.2 points, 8.5 rebounds and 5.0 assists in 12 league games.
