= Jon Elmore =

American basketball player (born 1995)

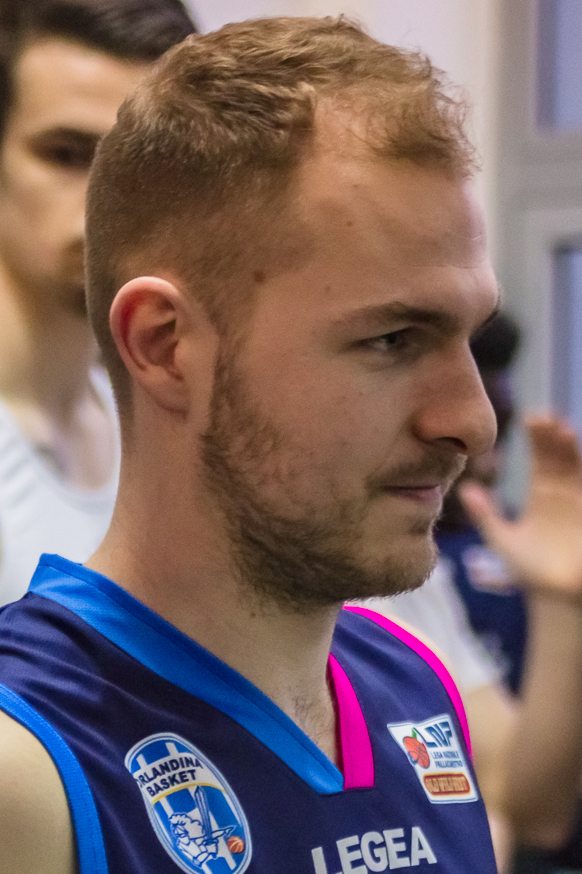
- Elmore with Orlandina in 2020

No. 33 – Austin Spurs
- Position: Point guard
- League: NBA G League

Personal information
- Born: December 20, 1995 (age 30) Charleston, West Virginia, U.S.
- Listed height: 6 ft 3 in (1.91 m)
- Listed weight: 190 lb (86 kg)

Career information
- High school: George Washington (Charleston, West Virginia)
- College: Marshall (2015–2019)
- NBA draft: 2019: undrafted
- Playing career: 2019–present

Career history
- 2019–2020: Trieste
- 2020: Orlandina
- 2020–2021: Ionikos Nikaias
- 2021: Sopron
- 2021–2022: Šiauliai
- 2022–2024: Sioux Falls Skyforce
- 2024: Cleveland Charge
- 2024–2025: Stockton Kings
- 2025: Manisa
- 2025–2026: Stockton Kings
- 2026: Calgary Surge
- 2026–present: Austin Spurs

Career highlights
- NBA G League champion (2025); All-LKL Team (2022); 3× First-team All-Conference USA (2017–2019); C-USA tournament MVP (2018); CIT champion (2019); West Virginia Mr. Basketball (2014)
- Stats at NBA.com
- Stats at Basketball Reference

Jonathan Barrett Elmore (born December 20, 1995) is an American professional basketball player for the Austin Spurs of the NBA G League. He played college basketball for the Marshall Thundering Herd.

== High school ==
Born in Charleston, West Virginia, Elmore averaged 31.4 points as a senior at George Washington High School in Charleston and was West Virginia player of the year. In the class of 2014, he was NR by ESPN and a 2 star recruit by 247 Sports.

== College career ==
He originally committed to play at VMI where his father, Gay Elmore, played. However, he left VMI before ever playing a game to be with his grandfather. He joined an intramural team at Marshall and was recruited to varsity by December 2015. In the 2016–17 season, he averaged 19.7 points per game and was a first team all-Conference USA selection. In his junior season 2017–18, Elmore led Marshall to their first Conference USA tournament championship and was named MVP of the tournament. Marshall then received an automatic berth to the NCAA Tournament and Elmore led the Herd to their first NCAA Tournament win, an upset of Wichita State, tallying 27 points. He averaged 22.7 points and 6.8 rebounds per game as a junior. After the season Elmore declared for the 2018 NBA draft but did not hire an agent, thus leaving open the possibility of returning to Marshall, which he did.

In his senior season, Elmore scored his 2,000th point in a November 28, 2018 game against William & Mary, becoming the third player in school history to achieve the milestone. On March 3, 2019, Elmore became the Conference USA all-time leading scorer, passing UTEP’s Stefon Jackson. Earlier in the season, Elmore became the conference’s all-time assist leader (passing UTEP’s Julyan Stone), making him the only current player leading a conference in both categories. Jon Elmore is the first player in NCAA Division I history to have over 2,500 points and over 750 assists. On March 19, 2019 Elmore became Marshall’s all-time leading scorer, breaking the record held by Skip Henderson. Elmore was then surpassed just four years later by Taevion Kinsey.

== Professional career ==
=== Pallacanestro Trieste (2019–2020) ===
After going undrafted in the 2019 NBA draft, Elmore joined the Boston Celtics for the 2019 NBA Summer League. On July 23, 2019, Elmore signed with Pallacanestro Trieste of the Italian league, Lega Basket Serie A (LBA). He averaged 7.5 points, 2 rebounds and 1.9 assists per game.

=== Orlandina Basket (2020) ===
On January 15, 2020, Elmore signed with Orlandina Basket of the Italian second division where he averaged 17 points per game.

=== Ionikos (2020–2021) ===
On December 5, 2020, Elmore signed with Ionikos of the Greek Basket League.

=== Soproni KC (2021) ===
On January 12, 2021, it was revealed that he had signed with Soproni KC of the Hungarian Nemzeti Bajnokság. Elmore averaged 17.3 points, 3.5 rebounds, 3.5 assists and 1.1 steals per game.

=== BC Šiauliai (2021–2022) ===
On August 14, 2021, Elmore signed with Larisa of the Greek Basket League, but did not make his debut with the club. On August 17, Elmore signed a one-year deal with BC Šiauliai of the Lithuanian Basketball League.

=== Sioux Falls Skyforce (2022–2024) ===
On October 14, 2022, Elmore signed a contract with the Miami Heat, but was waived the following day. Later that same month, Elmore signed with the Sioux Falls Skyforce of the NBA G League for the 2022–2023 season. In his debut regular season game with the Skyforce on December 27, 2022, Elmore recorded 3 points, 5 rebounds, 6 assists and 2 blocks in a 108 - 112 loss to the Oklahoma City Blue.

For the season, Elmore played in 31 games for the club, averaging 10.5 points, 3.8 rebounds, 5.6 assists in 26.6 minutes per game. The Skyforce finished the regular season 20 - 12 and reached the Conference Finals where they would be eliminated by the Rio Grande Valley Vipers. During the 3 playoff games, Elmore averaged 3.3 points, 2 rebounds and 3.7 assists.

On September 27, 2023, Elmore again signed with the Miami Heat, but was waived later that day. On October 30, he re-joined the Skyforce.

=== Cleveland Charge (2024) ===
Elmore would only play 3 games for the Skyforce in the regular season during his second season with the club before being traded to the Cleveland Charge on February 2, 2024 for the rights to Olin Carter III and a second-round pick in the 2024 G League Draft that previously belonged to the Osceola Magic.

He played just four games with the Charge averaging 6.3 points, 2.5 rebounds and 3 assists in 23.6 minutes per game.

=== Stockton Kings (2024–2025) ===
Just one month after joining the Charge, Elmore would be traded again to the Stockton Kings on March 6 for a second-round pick in the 2024 G League Draft. His arrival to the Kings saw Elmore average the lowest amount of minutes so far in his G League career, as he would only play in 11.2 minutes per game while averaging 2.8 points, 1.9 rebounds and 1.3 assists. The Kings were 16 - 9 when Elmore joined the team and he would play in the last 9 games of the season with them, helping them win 8 of their last 9 games to finish 24 - 10.

The Kings reached the playoffs and would reach the Conference Finals to face the Oklahoma City Blue. With 9 minutes off the bench, along with 4 points, 1 rebound and 1 assist from Elmore, the Kings fell to the Blue 107 - 114.

Elmore remained with the Kings for the 2024–25 season, and would go on to help Stockton win the 2025 NBA G League finals.

=== Manisa Basket (2025) ===
On April 24, 2025, Elmore signed with Manisa Basket of the Basketbol Süper Ligi (BSL).

=== Second stint with Stockton (2025–2026) ===
Elmore joined the Sacramento Kings for the 2025 NBA Summer League. On September 24, 2025, Elmore signed with the Sacramento Kings, but was waived the following day. On November 6, Elmore was announced as part of the Opening Night roster for the Stockton Kings of the NBA G League. On January 8, 2026, Elmore scored a career-high 32 points in a 128–115 victory over the Rio Grande Valley Vipers.

=== Calgary Surge (2026) ===
On May 1, 2026, Elmore joined the Calgary Surge of the Canadian Elite Basketball League (CEBL).

=== San Antonio Spurs (2026) ===
Elmore joined the Los Angeles Lakers for the 2026 NBA Summer League. On September 24, 2026, Elmore signed a contract with the San Antonio Spurs.

== The Basketball Tournament ==
Elmore played in The Basketball Tournament 2019 for the WV Wildcats, they were defeated in the first round by Big X. Elmore joined Herd That, a team composed primarily of Marshall alumni, in The Basketball Tournament 2020. The team was coached by his father, Gay Elmore. He scored 23 points as Herd That fell to Overseas Elite 93–76 in the quarterfinals.

== Career statistics ==
Legend
GP	Games played	GS	Games started	MPG	Minutes per game
FG%	Field goal percentage	3P%	3-point field goal percentage	FT%	Free throw percentage
RPG	Rebounds per game	APG	Assists per game	SPG	Steals per game
BPG	Blocks per game	PPG	Points per game	**Bold**	Career high

=== College ===
Year	Team	GP	GS	MPG	FG%	3P%	FT%	RPG	APG	SPG	BPG	PPG
2015–16	Marshall	25	25	34.6	.376	.345	.803	3.4	5.8	.8	.1	15.2
2016–17	Marshall	35	34	35.1	.413	.352	.807	4.3	5.9	1.1	.2	19.7
2017–18	Marshall	36	35	**38.3**	**.439**	.356	**.826**	**5.8**	**6.8**	1.6	.4	**22.7**
2018–19	Marshall	**37**	**37**	35.9	.393	**.364**	.789	5.1	5.1	**1.7**	**.5**	20.3
Career		133	131	36.1	.409	.356	.808	4.8	5.9	1.4	.3	19.8

== Personal life ==
Elmore comes from a basketball family. Born and raised in Charleston, West Virginia, by his father and mother, Gay and Elizabeth Elmore. His father, Gay Elmore, was VMI's all-time leading scorer and his grandfather, Otmer, played basketball at West Virginia. His brother, Ot, played basketball at Texas–Rio Grande Valley before transferring to Marshall to play alongside Elmore. On March 9, 2019, he became engaged to his long-term girlfriend and former Marshall University student-athlete, Tori Dent.

== See also ==
- List of NCAA Division I men's basketball career scoring leaders
