= Bob Allen (basketball) =

American basketball player (1946–2025)

Personal information
- Born: July 17, 1946 Port Huron, Michigan, U.S.
- Died: December 9, 2025 (aged 79) Nicholasville, Kentucky, U.S.
- Listed height: 6 ft 9 in (2.06 m)
- Listed weight: 205 lb (93 kg)

Career information
- High school: St. Stephen (Port Huron, Michigan)
- College: Marshall (1965–1968)
- NBA draft: 1968: 6th round, 71st overall pick
- Drafted by: San Francisco Warriors
- Playing career: 1968–1969
- Position: Power forward
- Number: 50

Career history
- 1968–1969: San Francisco Warriors

Career highlights
- Second-team All-MAC (1967)

Career NBA statistics
- Points: 48 (1.8 ppg)
- Rebounds: 56 (2.1 rpg)
- Assists: 10 (0.4 apg)
- Stats at NBA.com
- Stats at Basketball Reference

Robert Joseph Allen (July 17, 1946 – December 9, 2025) was an American professional basketball player. He played in the National Basketball Association (NBA) for the San Francisco Warriors during the 1968–69 season.

== Biography ==
Allen was born in Port Huron, Michigan, and attended St. Stephen High School. He earned a scholarship to attend Marshall University and play basketball for Thundering Herd. Allen was a second-team All-Mid-American Conference (MAC) selection as a junior and led the conference in rebounds with 14.2 per game as a senior.

He was selected by the San Francisco Warriors in the 1968 NBA draft. He played in 27 games for the Warriors during the 1968–69 season. Allen was recruited to play for the Baltimore Bullets the following season but he decided to accept a job with Ashland, Inc. in Kentucky where he worked for 36 years.

Allen lived in Kentucky with his wife until his death. They had two children. He died on December 9, 2025, at the age of 79.

He was inducted into the Marshall Athletics Hall of Fame in 2003 and Port Huron Sports Hall of Fame in 2011.

== Career statistics ==
Legend
GP	Games played	GS	Games started	MPG	Minutes per game
FG%	Field goal percentage	3P%	3-point field goal percentage	FT%	Free throw percentage
RPG	Rebounds per game	APG	Assists per game	SPG	Steals per game
BPG	Blocks per game	PPG	Points per game	**Bold**	Career high

=== NBA ===
==== Regular season ====
Year	Team	GP	MPG	FG%	FT%	RPG	APG	PPG
1968–69	San Francisco	27	8.6	.326	.556	2.1	.4	1.8

==== Playoffs ====
Year	Team	GP	MPG	FG%	FT%	RPG	APG	PPG
1969	San Francisco	3	6.3	.000	.571	2.0	.0	1.3
