= George Stone (basketball) =

American basketball player (1946–1993)

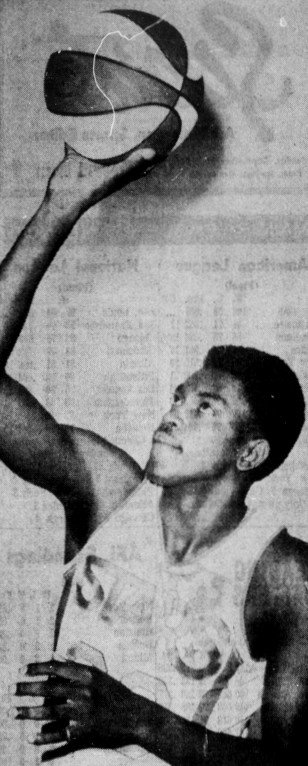

Personal information
- Born: February 9, 1946 Murray, Kentucky, U.S.
- Died: December 30, 1993 (aged 47) Columbus, Ohio, U.S.
- Listed height: 6 ft 7 in (2.01 m)
- Listed weight: 195 lb (88 kg)

Career information
- High school: William Grant (Covington, Kentucky)
- College: Marshall (1965–1968)
- NBA draft: 1968: 9th round, 115th overall pick
- Drafted by: Los Angeles Lakers
- Position: Small forward
- Number: 33

Career history
- 1968–1971: Los Angeles / Utah Stars
- 1971: Carolina Cougars

Career highlights
- ABA champion (1971); First-team All-MAC (1967)
- Stats at Basketball Reference

George E. Stone (February 9, 1946 – December 30, 1993) was an American professional basketball player who spent several seasons in the American Basketball Association (ABA). He was drafted in the ninth round of the 1968 NBA draft (115th pick overall) by the Los Angeles Lakers, but never played for them or any other NBA team.

A 6'7" forward from Marshall University, he scored 1,723 points in his three seasons, leading the MAC in points for his last two seasons. The team reached the semifinal round of the NIT in 1967. He was inducted into the Marshall Athletics Hall of Fame in 1999. Stone played four seasons (1968–1972) in the ABA as a member of the Los Angeles / Utah Stars and Carolina Cougars. Stone played a key role in the Stars making the 1970 ABA Finals, leading the team in scoring during the playoffs at 23.6 points per game. He averaged 13.6 points per game over the course of his career and ranked tenth in ABA history in three point field goal percentage (.323). He also won a league championship with the Utah Stars (the year the team relocated) in 1971.

Stone died of a heart attack on December 30, 1993. In 2018, a court was named in his honor at the Old Seminary Square neighborhood.
