= Charlie Slack =

American basketball player (1931–2020)

Personal information
- Born: February 26, 1931 Pomeroy, Ohio, U.S.
- Died: July 3, 2020 (aged 89) Akron, Ohio, U.S.
- Listed height: 6 ft 5 in (1.96 m)

Career information
- High school: Pomeroy (Pomeroy, Ohio)
- College: Marshall (1952–1956)
- NBA draft: 1956: 4th round, 30th overall pick
- Drafted by: Fort Wayne Pistons
- Position: Forward

Career history
- 1956–1961: Akron Goodyear Wingfoots

Career highlights
- NCAA rebounding leader (1955); 2× First-team All-MAC (1955, 1956); No. 17 retired by Marshall Thundering Herd
- Stats at Basketball Reference

Charles E. Slack (February 26, 1931 – July 3, 2020) was an American college basketball player from Marshall University. He holds the National Collegiate Athletic Association (NCAA) Division I record for the highest single-season rebound average when he grabbed 25.6 rpg in 1954–55.

Considered one of the greatest rebounders in college basketball history, he had his Marshall uniform number (#17) retired in January 2000. In his four-year career with the Thundering Herd, from 1952–53 to 1955–56, Slack compiled 1,916 career rebounds, which is third all-time behind Tom Gola's 2,201 and Joe Holup's 2,030. Additionally, Slack's effort of 43 rebounds against Charleston (West Virginia) on January 12, 1954, is the second highest single game rebound total in NCAA history behind Bill Chambers' 51. Slack owns the top four spots on Marshall's season rebounding average list with 25.6, 23.6, 22.2 and 16.3 rebounds per game. A prodigious rebounder, he also scored 1,551 points during his career.

Slack was drafted by the Fort Wayne Pistons in the 1956 NBA draft, but he never played professionally. He was, however, an alternate for the 1960 United States men's basketball team at the Olympics. Slack was also a member of the varsity football team and was inducted into the Marshall University Athletics Hall of Fame in 1985 as a two-sport star. In 2019, he was inducted into the Ohio Basketball Hall of Fame.

Slack died July 3, 2020, at the age of 89.

== See also ==
- List of NCAA Division I men's basketball players with 30 or more rebounds in a game
- List of NCAA Division I men's basketball season rebounding leaders
- List of NCAA Division I men's basketball career rebounding leaders
