= Marshall Thundering Herd men's basketball =

Basketball team of Marshall University

Marshall Thundering Herd Basketball
2026–27 Marshall Thundering Herd men's basketball team
- University: Marshall University
- First season: 1907; 119 years ago
- Head coach: Cornelius Jackson (3rd season)
- Location: Huntington, West Virginia
- Arena: Cam Henderson Center (capacity: 9,048)
- Conference: Sun Belt Conference
- Nickname: Marshall Thundering Herd
- Colors: Kelly green and white
- Student section: The Stampede
- All-time record: 1522–1138–2 (.572)

NCAA Division I tournament round of 32
- 2018

NCAA Division I tournament appearances
- 1956, 1972, 1984, 1985, 1987*, 2018

Conference tournament champions
- SoCon: 1984, 1985, 1987 CUSA: 2018

Conference regular-season champions
- Buckeye: 1937, 1938, 1939 MAC: 1956 SoCon: 1984, 1987, 1988

Conference division champions
- SoCon North: 1995, 1997

Uniforms
Home	Away	Alternate
- * vacated by NCAA

The Marshall Thundering Herd men's basketball team represents Marshall University in Huntington, West Virginia, United States. They compete in the NCAA Division I as a member of the Sun Belt Conference. The Thundering Herd are led by head coach Cornelius Jackson and play their home games at the on-campus Cam Henderson Center which opened in 1981.

Marshall has advanced to the NCAA tournament five times through the years (their 1987 appearance having been vacated), most recently in 2018. The Thundering Herd has also played in the NIT five times, last appearing in 2012. Marshall won the NAIA National Championship in 1947, and is 7–2 all-time in the first collegiate basketball tournament, one year older than the NIT and four years older than the NCAA Tournament.

Notable former Marshall basketball players include NBA and Marshall Hall of Famer Hal Greer, who was named as one of the NBA's 50 best players of all time. Greer was selected to 10 consecutive NBA All-Star games. Greer was named NBA All-Star Game MVP in 1968, one year after leading the Philadelphia 76ers to the NBA title. Additionally, Marshall's Andy Tonkovich was the first overall selection in the BAA (now NBA) draft in 1948. Mike D'Antoni, current coaching consultant for the New Orleans Pelicans and 2x NBA Coach of the Year winner, played college basketball at Marshall from 1970 to 1973.

== History ==
=== Cam Henderson era ===
The legendary coach of the Thundering Herd was Cam Henderson. Henderson, acknowledged as the creator of the modern zone defense, won 358 games against just 158 losses between 1935–1955. Henderson led Marshall to three consecutive Buckeye Conference titles from 1936 to 1939, but his greatest team was the 1946–47 team. They set a Marshall school record with 32 wins in a season; a 17–0 start to the season; a 35-game home winning streak; and won the National Championship in the National Association for Intercollegiate Basketball (today's NAIA) in Kansas City in 1947, sweeping five games in six days. Marshall also played in the NAIB Tournament in 1938 and 1948, losing in the quarterfinals. His 1947–48 team won the Helms Foundation Los Angeles Invitational with a 46–44 win over Syracuse, the same year Henderson coached the Marshall football team to the second-ever Tangerine Bowl.

Andy Tonkovich, who played on that team, was the first draft pick of the 1948 BAA draft by Providence. Center Charlie Slack set a still NCAA record of 25.6 rebounds per game for Henderson's final team in 1954–55. Tonkovich, Gene "Goose" James and Bill Hall were First Team NAIB All-Americans in 1947, joined by Bill Toothman on the second team and Mervin Gutshall on honorable mention, meaning all five starters were on the All-American team. Tonkovich repeated on the second team in 1948. Walt Walowac was a first team Helms Foundation Small College All-American for Henderson in 1953, and was third team on the Helms squad in 1954.

Henderson recorded wins over such marquee programs as Syracuse, Virginia, Memphis, Virginia Tech, Pepperdine, Xavier, Dayton, Louisville (No. 19 in the nation in 1950, a 96–72 Marshall win), Indiana State (Henderson was 2–1 versus John Wooden, when the UCLA legend was coaching the Sycamores), BYU, Idaho, Hawaii, Cincinnati, Tennessee, Western Kentucky, Loyola, Maryland, Miami-Florida, Denver, St. Francis, Wichita State, Colorado, Cal, CCNY, Long Island Univ., South Carolina and St. Louis. His 1954–55 team was second in the Mid-American Conference, but was denied a berth in the NIT by the league in the wake of the cheating scandals in New York and other college spots in the early 1950s.

=== Post-Henderson era (Jules Rivlin, Ellis Johnson, Carl Tacy, Bob Daniels, and Bob Zuffelato) ===
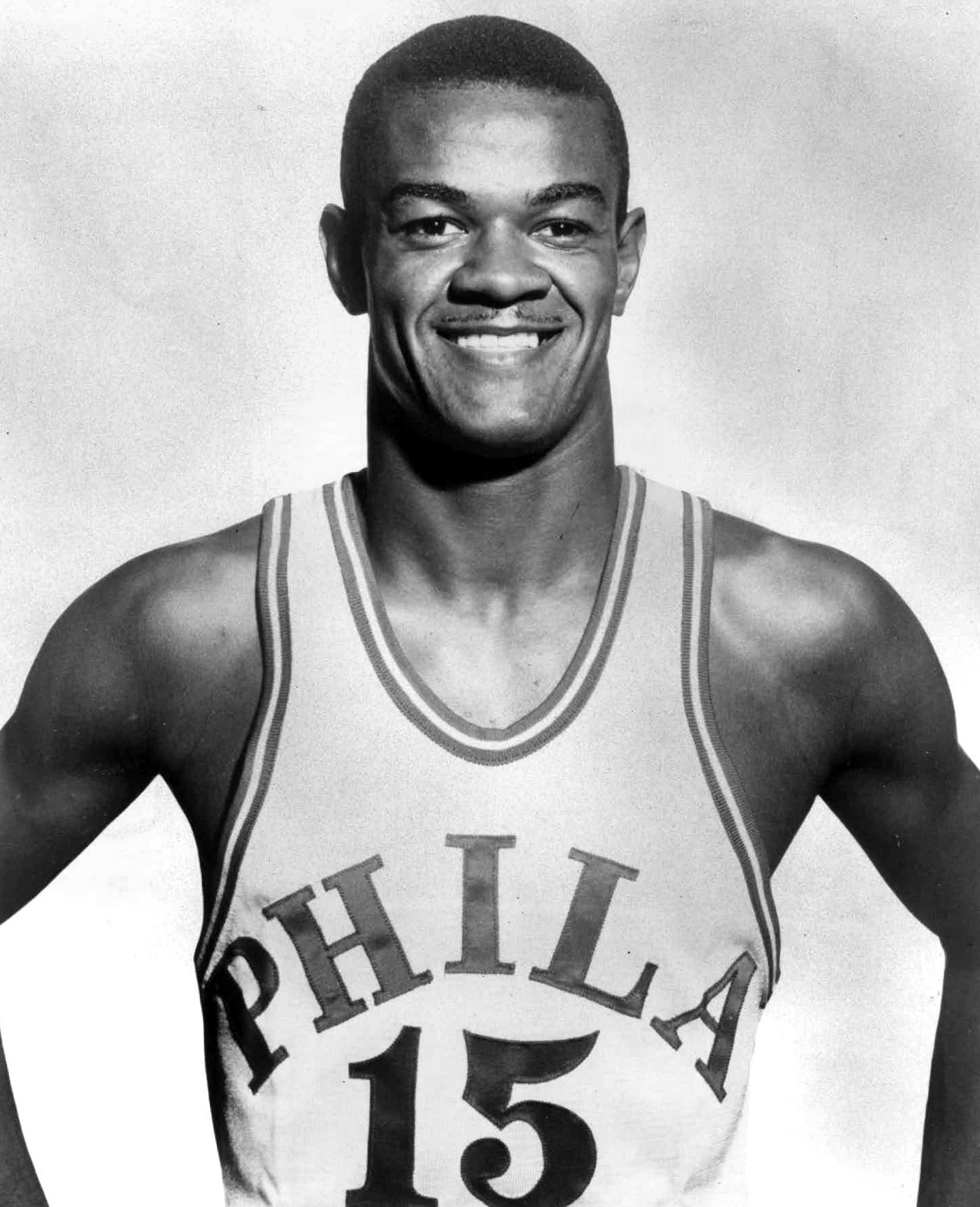
Hall of Famer Hal Greer played under coach Jule Rivlin from 1955 to 1958

Henderson's first basketball All-American, Jule Rivlin, coached the 1955–56 Herd to its only MAC title and first-ever NCAA Tournament. Rivlin's 1958 Herd led the nation in scoring, with Hal Greer and Leo Byrd, scoring 88.1 points per game and topping the Jerry West-led Mountaineers of West Virginia University who averaged 88.0 points per game. Byrd was an All-American in 1959, first team on the Chuck Taylor/Converse team and second team on UPI and Helms Foundation. Henderson and Tonkovich are both members of the Helms Foundation NAIA Hall of Fame.

Marshall was coached to the NIT in 1967 by Ellis T. Johnson (the first All-American for legendary Kentucky coach Adolph Rupp), advancing to the semifinals thanks in part to George Stone scoring 46 points versus Nebraska in their quarterfinal game. Stone went on to play professionally for four years in the American Basketball Association (ABA). Johnson brought the Herd back to the NIT in 1968 behind point guard Dan D'Antoni, but they lost in the first round.

Carl Tacy coached the Herd to a 23–4 season in 1971–72, losing to Southwest Louisiana, 112–101 in the NCAA Tournament. Marshall was ranked as high as No. 8 in the nation that season, and finished 12th in the nation. Russell Lee was a Converse All-American in 1972, and was selected in the first round of the ABA Draft and second round by the Milwaukee Bucks of the NBA, playing for that team for two years and three seasons overall in the NBA. Bob Daniels was the Herd coach beginning in the 1972–73 season leading the team to an appearance in the NIT. Mike D'Antoni was the point guard for the NCAA Tournament team in 1972 and the NIT team in 1973, was a CoSIDA Academic All-American both seasons and was awarded an NCAA post-graduate scholarship. He was drafted by the Kansas City-Omaha Kings and played four seasons in the NBA before moving on to greater glory in the Italian League, winning titles as a player and coach. Kobe Bryant wore No. 8 his first few seasons in the NBA because that was the number D'Antoni wore when he played with Kobe's father in Italy.

Marshall advanced to the school's first conference title game in 1978, falling to Furman in the title game under charismatic coach Stu Aberdeen. Bob Zuffelato took the Herd to the Southern Conference finals in 1979–80, falling again to Furman, after Aberdeen died during the summer of 1979 while on vacation. The 1980–81 team saw Marshall post its first-ever win over West Virginia at the WVU Coliseum in Morgantown, West Virginia. Marshall won the first game played against WVU in Huntington in 1982–83. Marshall would go on to be 5–0 versus the Mountaineers in Huntington before the series moved permanently to the Charleston Civic Center in the state capital.

=== Rick Huckabay era ===
Rick Huckabay led Marshall to six Southern Conference titles - three regular season ones and three conference tournament championships. His teams made three NCAA Tournaments (the 1987 appearance later vacated by the NCAA) and an NIT appearance from 1983 to 1989, although they lost all four postseason contests. John Taft and Skip Henderson were both recruited by Huckabay and are one-two in scoring at Marshall all-time. A highlight of Huckabay's time at Marshall occurred on February 7, 1985, when backup guard Bruce Morris made the longest shot in NCAA basketball history. The "Shot Herd Round the World" measured 89 feet, 10 inches and ended the first half. Marshall went on to defeat Appalachian State in that game, 93–82.

=== Post Huckabay Era (Billy Donovan, Greg White, Donnie Jones, and Tom Herrion) ===
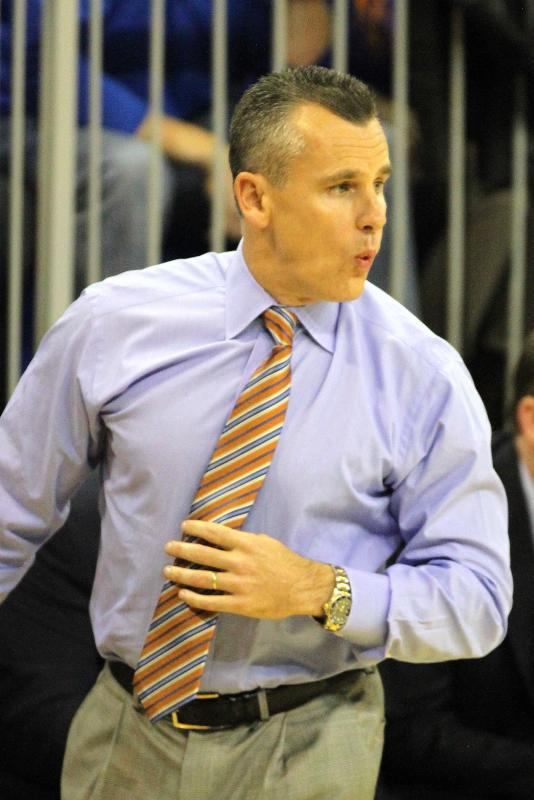
Billy Donovan

When Billy Donovan was hired in 1994, he was 28 years old and the youngest head coach in NCAA Division I. Donovan helped land West Virginia native and future NBA standout Jason Williams after he had originally signed with Providence. When Donovan left to become the head coach of the University of Florida in 1996, Williams followed him to the Gators. Donovan led the Thundering Herd to the Southern Conference North division title in the 1994–95 season. He went 35–20 in two seasons at Marshall. Notable assistant coaches at Marshall under Donovan included Anthony Grant and John Pelphrey.

Keith Veney set an NCAA record with 15 three-pointers in Marshall's Henderson Center against Morehead State University on December 14, 1996 for new head coach Greg White, who had been Marshall's point guard from 1977 to 1981. White followed in the great Marshall tradition of outstanding players from the Mullens, West Virginia area including both Mike and Dan D'Antoni. White coached his first Marshall team to its final Southern Conference tournament title game in 1996–97, falling to UT-Chattanooga on a last-second, game-winning shot. Marshall joined the Mid-American Conference for the second time in 1997–98, and the Herd was 21–9 in 1999–2000 under White, falling in the MAC semi-finals to Miami, Ohio. White's overall record at Marshall in seven seasons was 115–84.

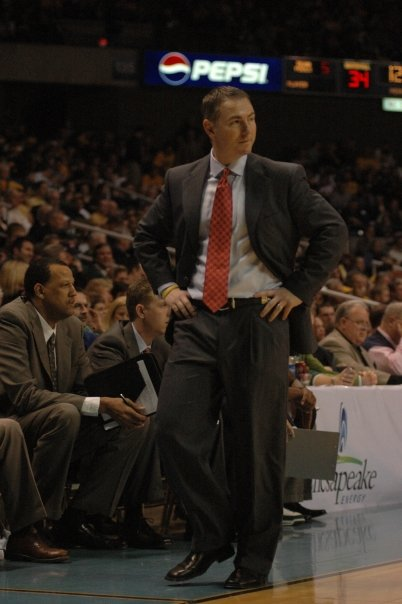
Donnie Jones

Before Donnie Jones came to coach Marshall from 2007 to 2010, he was an assistant with the Florida Gators for 11 years and helped Billy Donovan coach the Gators to consecutive national championships in 2006 and 2007. Jones got Marshall to a winning record for the first time since 2001 with a 16–14 mark in his first season In 2010, Jones coached Marshall to the CIT, which was their first post-season tournament since 1988. Marshall fell to Appalachian State in the CIT quarterfinals. Following the 2010 season, and amid growing fan concern over Marshall's performance in the 2010 CUSA and CIT tournaments, Donnie Jones left Marshall to coach conference rival UCF. Considering Jones' success at Marshall and his local ties to the Huntington area, many Marshall fans considered his departure a betrayal, further fueling the Marshall-UCF rivalry.

In 2010, Marshall hired former College of Charleston head coach, Tom Herrion, to lead the Thundering Herd. In 2012, Herrion coached the Thundering Herd to the National Invitational Tournament for the first time since 1988. However, after back-to-back losing seasons in 2013 and 2014, Marshall bought out the remaining two years of his contract. In four seasons as head coach, Herrion's record was .500, going 67–67.

=== Dan D'Antoni era ===
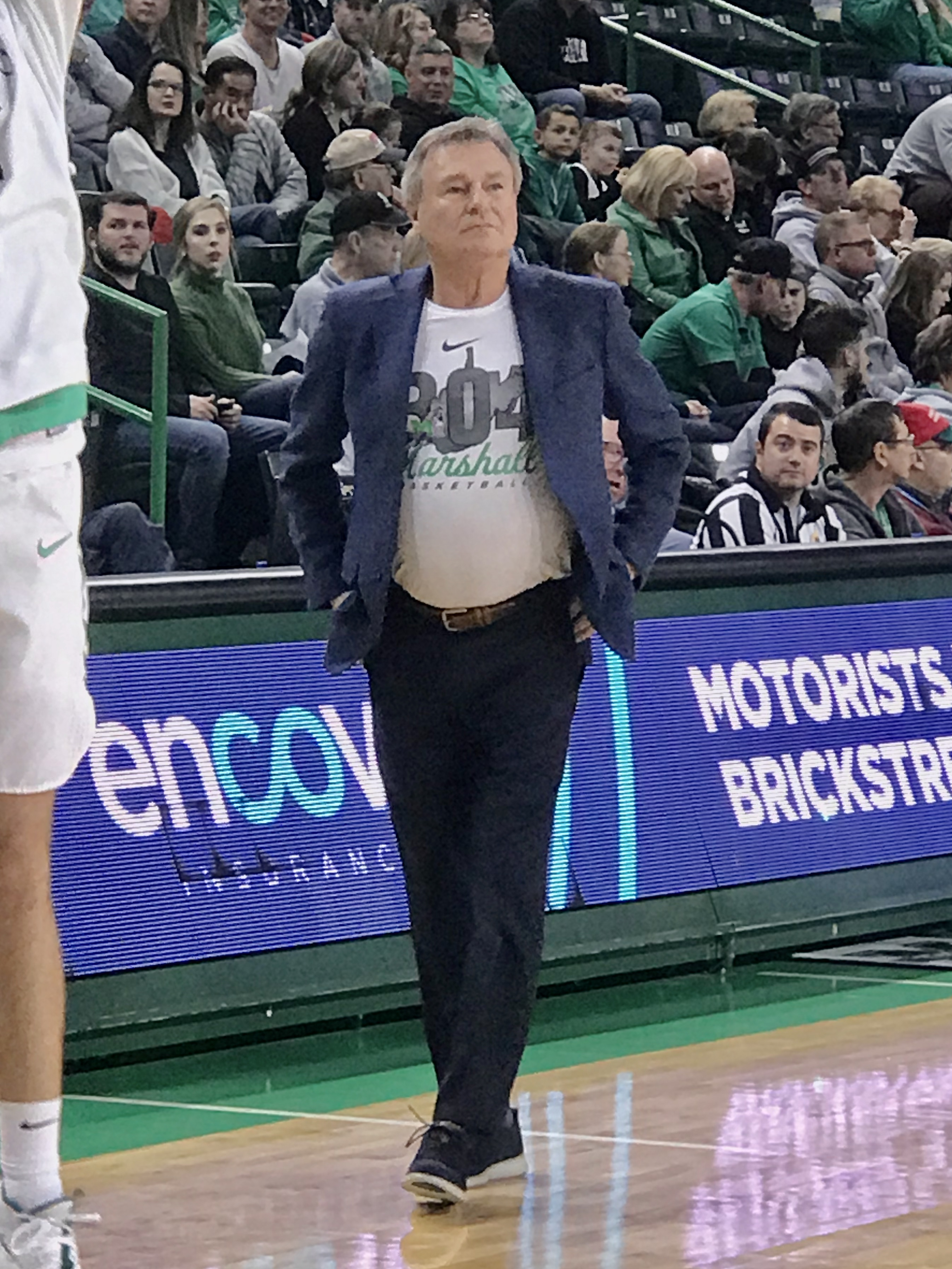
Dan D'Antoni

On April 24, 2014, Marshall University Athletic Director Mike Hamrick announced Mullens native and Los Angeles Lakers assistant coach, Dan D'Antoni, as the next head coach of the Thundering Herd.

D'Antoni is a Marshall alum and played point guard for The Herd from 1966 to 1970. He led the team in scoring with a 17.5 scoring average in 1968–69 and led the 1967 team to the semifinals of the National Invitation Tournament, losing to Marquette 83–78 and then losing to Rutgers 93–76 in the 3rd place game. In 1968, he again led the team to the NIT, losing to St. Peter's 102–93 in the first round. He is one of 49 Marshall players to score 1,000 points, tallying 1,109. In 1990, he was inducted into the Marshall University Athletic Hall of Fame.

For the 2017–18 season, Marshall and coach D'Antoni finished the regular season with a win and season sweep over 24th-ranked Middle Tennessee, Marshall's first win over a top-25 opponent since 2011. In the ensuing Conference USA tournament as the conference's fourth seed, Marshall dominated against UTSA and Southern Miss, before hanging on late against Western Kentucky 67–66 in the conference tournament title game. This gave Marshall its first Conference USA championship and sent the Thundering Herd to the NCAA tournament for the first time in 31 years. As the 13th seed in the East, D'Antoni also led the Thundering Herd to their first-ever NCAA Tournament victory in program history, an 81–75 win over Wichita State, the region's fourth seed, in the first round. Marshall would eventually get knocked out in the second round by a 94–71 loss to in-state rival West Virginia.

For the 2018–19 season, Marshall finished the regular season as the Conference USA's sixth seed and on a season-high five-game win streak. Marshall, however, was not able to repeat the previous season's success and was knocked out in the conference tournament quarterfinals to Southern Miss, before ultimately accepting an invite in the CIT for the first time since 2011. As the tournament's number one seed, Marshall was able to secure a second-round bye following its opening-round 78–73 win over IUPUI. Following quarterfinal and semifinal wins over Presbyterian and Hampton respectively, Marshall would move on to the CIT Championship game against Green Bay, which they would dominate with a 90–70 victory and secure the program's first postseason hoops title in 72 years.

== Postseason results ==
=== NCAA tournament results ===
Marshall has appeared in the NCAA tournament six times, although the official tally is five as their 1987 appearance was vacated due to NCAA violations. Their combined record is 1–6, or 1–5 by the official NCAA tally.

Year	Round	Opponent	Result	Notes
1956	First Round	Morehead State	L 92–107	
1972	First Round	Louisiana	L 101–112	
1984	First Round	Villanova	L 72–84	
1985	First Round	VCU	L 65–81	
1987	First Round	TCU	L 60–76	Vacated
2018	First Round; Second Round	Wichita State; West Virginia	W 81–75; L 71–94	

=== National Invitation Tournament results ===
Marshall has been selected to participate in five National Invitation Tournaments. Their combined record is 2–6.

Year	Round	Opponent	Result
1967	First Round; Quarterfinals; Semifinals; 3rd Place Game	Villanova; Nebraska; Marquette; Rutgers	W 70–68; W 119–88; L 78–83; L 76–93
1968	First Round	Saint Peter's	L 93–102
1973	First Round	Fairfield	L 76–80
1988	First Round	VCU	L 80–81
2012	First Round	Middle Tennessee	L 78–86

=== CollegeInsider.com Postseason Tournament results ===
Marshall has been selected to participate in three CollegeInsider.com Postseason Tournaments. Their combined record is 5–2. They were the CIT Champions in 2019.

Year	Round	Opponent	Result
2010	First Round; Quarterfinals	Western Carolina; Appalachian State	W 90–88; L 72–80
2011	First Round	Ohio	L 64–65
2019	First Round; Quarterfinals; Semifinals; Championship	IUPUI; Presbyterian; Hampton; Green Bay	W 78–73; W 83–66; W 80–78; W 90–70

=== NAIA tournament results ===
The Thundering Herd have appeared in the NAIA tournament three times. Their combined record is 7–2. They were NAIA National Champions in 1947.

Year	Round	Opponent	Result
1938	First Round; Second Round	Peru State; Washburn	W 67–60; L 51–53
1947	First Round; Second Round; Quarterfinals; Semifinals; National Championship Game	River Falls State; Hamline; Eastern Washington; Emporia State; Mankato State	W 113–80; W 55–54; W 56–48; W 56–55; W 73–59
1948	First Round; Second Round	Peru State; San Jose State	W 72–53; L 72–74 ^{OT}

== Home venues ==
Vanity Fair, 600 block of 4th Avenue (until 1949)

- Veterans Memorial Fieldhouse (1950–1981)
- Cam Henderson Center (1981–present)

== Head coaches ==
Tenure	Coach	Record	Pct.
1906–1908	L. B. Crotty	5–1–1	.786
1908–1910; 1911–1914	Boyd Chambers	14–16	.467
1918–1919	Arch Reilly	2–5	.286
1920–1921	Skeeter Shelton	6–9	.400
1921–1922	Herbert Cramer	5–4–1	.550
1922–1923	J. E. R. Barnes	1–3	.250
1923–1924; 1926–1927	Bill Strickling	15–17	.469
1924–1925	Russ Meredith	12–6	.667
1925–1926	Charles Tallman	10–7	.588
1927–1931	Johnny Stuart	46–29	.613
1931–1935	Tom Dandelet	42–38	.525
1935–1955	Cam Henderson	362–159	.695
1955–1963	Jule Rivlin	100–88	.532
1963–1969	Ellis T. Johnson	68–80	.459
1969–1971	Stewart Way	25–24	.510
1971–1972	Carl Tacy	23–4	.852
1972–1977	Bob Daniels	71–62	.534
1977–1979	Stu Aberdeen	25–31	.446
1979–1983	Bob Zuffelato	71–41	.634
1983–1989	Rick Huckabay	129–59	.686
1989–1990	Dana Altman	15–13	.536
1990–1994	Dwight Freeman	46–65	.414
1994–1996	Billy Donovan	35–20	.636
1996–2003	Greg White	115–84	.578
2003–2007	Ron Jirsa	43–74	.368
2007–2010	Donnie Jones	55–41	.573
2010–2014	Tom Herrion	67–67	.500
2014–2024	Dan D'Antoni	177–148	.545
2024–present	Cornelius Jackson	19–12	.613

== Players ==
=== Retired numbers ===
Marshall has retired seven numbers in program history. The program has also retired six additional jerseys without retiring the numbers associated with them.

Marshall Thundering Herd retired numbers
No.	Player	Tenure	Ref.
10	Mike D'Antoni	1970–1973	
16	Hal Greer	1955–1958	
17	Charlie Slack	1952–1956	
20	Walt Walowac	1950–1954	
22	John Taft	1988–1991	
44	Leo Byrd	1956–1959	
55	Russ Lee	1969–1972	

=== Herd in the NBA ===
Herd in the NBA
NBA Draft selections
Total selected:	20
First picks in draft:	1
1st Round:	2

Current player in bold

- Bob Allen – San Francisco Warriors
- Mike D'Antoni – Kansas City–Omaha Kings, San Antonio Spurs
- Hal Greer – Syracuse Nationals/Philadelphia 76ers
- Gene James – New York Knicks, Baltimore Bullets
- Jerry Kelly – Boston Celtics, Providence Steamrollers
- Russ Lee – Milwaukee Bucks, New Orleans Jazz
- Bucky McConnell – Milwaukee Hawks
- Tamar Slay – New Jersey Nets, Charlotte Bobcats
- Andy Tonkovich – Providence Steamrollers
- Jason Williams transferred to Florida – Sacramento Kings, Memphis Grizzlies, Miami Heat, Orlando Magic
- Hassan Whiteside – Sacramento Kings, Miami Heat, Portland Trail Blazers

=== Herd abroad ===
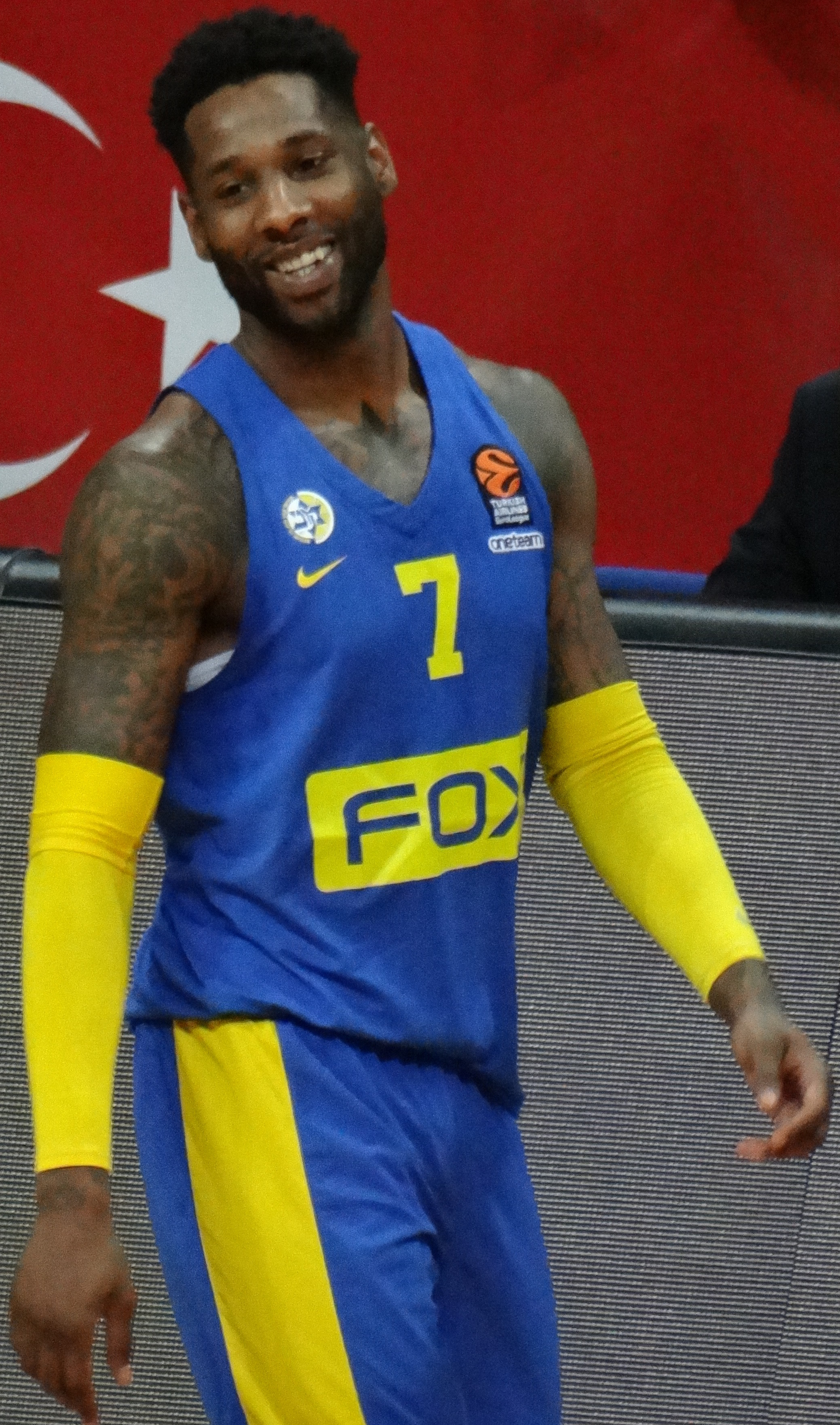
DeAndre Kane

- Stevie Browning – Trabzonspor B.K., Szolnoki Olaj KK, Kolossos Rodou B.C., BK Inter Bratislava
- Jon Elmore – Pallacanestro Trieste, Soproni KC, BC Šiauliai
- DeAndre Kane – Israeli Premier League and EuroLeague
- James Kelly – Incheon Electroland Elephants, Changwon LG Sakers, Hapoel Gilboa Galil
- Ken Labanowski (born 1959) – American-Israeli basketball player in the Israel Basketball Premier League
- Aleksa Nikolić – Spartak Saint Petersburg, KK Ilirija, KK FMP, KK Zlatibor
- Dagoberto Peña – Maldonado, Leones de Santo Domingo, Academia de la Montaña, FC Barcelona Bàsquet B, CB Estudiantes, BC Pieno žvaigždės, CB Breogán
- Ajdin Penava – Saski Baskonia, Belfius Mons-Hainaut, Spójnia Stargard
- Damier Pitts – KFÍ, İstanbul DSİ, Roseto Sharks, BK Ventspils, Valmiera Ordo, Kataja BC, S.L. Benfica, Jászberényi KSE
- Cheikh Sane – Team FOG Næstved, Koroivos, Saitama Broncos, Horsens IC
- Nigel Spikes – Miami Midnites, Halifax Rainmen, Maccabi Haifa B.C., Manzaneros de Cuauhtemoc, Sioux Falls Skyforce, Wellington Saints, Fukushima Firebonds, Akita Northern Happinets, Earthfriends Tokyo Z
- Ryan Taylor – ÍR
