= 2019–20 Conference USA men's basketball season =

- League: NCAA Division I
- Sport: Basketball
- Teams: 14
- TV partner(s): CBS Sports Network, Stadium, ESPN+, ESPN3

2018–19 NCAA Division I men's basketball season
- Season MVP: Javion Hamlet

Tournament

Basketball seasons
- ← 2018–19 2020–21 →

2019–20 Conference USA men's basketball standings
	Conf.				Overall
Team	W		L	PCT	W		L	PCT
North Texas	14	–	4	.778	20	–	11	.645
Western Kentucky	13	–	5	.722	20	–	10	.667
Louisiana Tech	13	–	5	.722	22	–	8	.733
Charlotte	10	–	8	.556	16	–	13	.552
FIU	9	–	9	.500	19	–	13	.594
Marshall	10	–	8	.556	17	–	15	.531
UAB	9	–	9	.500	19	–	13	.594
Old Dominion	9	–	9	.500	13	–	19	.406
Florida Atlantic	8	–	10	.444	17	–	15	.531
UTSA	7	–	11	.389	13	–	19	.406
UTEP	8	–	10	.444	17	–	15	.531
Rice	7	–	11	.389	15	–	17	.469
Southern Miss	5	–	13	.278	9	–	22	.290
Middle Tennessee	4	–	14	.222	8	–	23	.258
Note: The 2020 C-USA tournament was canceled prior to the quarterfinals due to the COVID-19 pandemic.

The 2019–20 Conference USA men's basketball season began with practices in October 2019, followed by the start of the 2019–20 NCAA Division I men's basketball season in November. Conference play started in late December 2019 and will end in March 2020, after which 12 member teams will participate in the 2020 Conference USA tournament at The Ford Center at The Star in Frisco, Texas. The tournament champion is guaranteed a selection to the 2020 NCAA tournament.

== Preseason ==
Western Kentucky was picked as the favorite in the champion in the preseason poll of Conference USA's fourteen coaches.

=== Preseason Poll ===
1.	WKU (13)
2.	UTSA (1)
3.	Louisiana Tech
4.	UTEP
5.	Old Dominion
6.	UAB
7.	North Texas
8.	Middle Tennessee
9.	Florida Atlantic
10.	FIU
11.	Marshall
12.	Charlotte
13.	Rice
14.	Southern Miss

() first place votes

=== Preseason All-Conference teams ===
Media
Devon Andrews FIU
Jailyn Ingram Florida Atlantic
DaQuan Bracey Louisiana Tech
Antonio Green Middle Tennessee
Xavier Green Old Dominion
Zack Bryant UAB
Jhivvan Jackson UTSA
Keaton Wallace UTSA
Taveion Hollingsworth WKU
Charles Bassey WKU

== Head coaches ==
=== Coaching changes ===
On April 11, 2019, Southern Miss head coach Doc Sadler announced his resignation after 5 seasons at the school. 6 days later, the Eagles hired Southeastern Louisiana head coach and Southern Miss alum Jay Ladner for the head coaching job.

=== Coaches ===
Team	Head coach	Previous job	Year at school	Overall record	C-USA record	C-USA championships	NCAA Tournaments
Charlotte	Ron Sanchez	Virginia (asst.)	2	8–21	5–13	0	0
FIU	Jeremy Ballard	VCU (asst.)	2	20–14	10–8	0	0
Florida Atlantic	Dusty May	Florida (asst.)	2	17–16	8–10	0	0
Louisiana Tech	Eric Konkol	Miami (asst.)	6	129–65	67–39	0	0
Marshall	Dan D'Antoni	Los Angeles Lakers (asst.)	6	96–77	52–38	1	1
Middle Tennessee	Nick McDevitt	UNC Asheville	2	11–21	8–10	0	0
North Texas	Grant McCasland	Arkansas State	3	41–30	16–20	0	0
Old Dominion	Jeff Jones	American	7	140–67	73–32	1	1
Rice	Scott Pera	Rice (asst.)	3	20–43	12–24	0	0
Southern Miss	Jay Ladner	Southeastern Louisiana	1	0–0	0–0	0	0
UAB	Robert Ehsan	UAB (asst.)	4	57–44	29–25	0	0
UTEP	Rodney Terry	Fresno State	2	8–21	3–15	0	0
UTSA	Steve Henson	Oklahoma (asst.)	4	51–49	29–25	0	0
WKU	Rick Stansbury	Texas A&M (asst.)	4	62–42	34–20	0	0

Notes:

- All records, appearances, titles, etc. are from time with current school only.
- Year at school includes 2019–20 season.
- Overall and C-USA records are from time at current school and are through the end of the 2018–19 season.

== Conference matrix ==
	Charlotte	Florida International	Florida Atlantic	Louisiana Tech	Marshall	Middle Tennessee	North Texas	Old Dominion	Rice	Southern Miss	UAB	UTEP	UTSA	Western Kentucky
vs. Charlotte	–	0−1	0−1	1−0	0–1	0–1	1−0	1–1	1–0	1–0	0–1	0–1	0–1	1−1
vs. FIU	1−0	–	0−2	1−0	1–0	0−1	1−0	0–1	1–0	1–0	0–1	0–1	0–1	0−1
vs. Florida Atlantic	1−0	2−0	–	1−0	0−1	0−1	1−0	1−0	0−1	1−0	1−1	0−1	0−1	0−1
vs. Louisiana Tech	0−1	0−1	0–1	–	1–0	0−1	1−1	0–1	0–1	0–2	0–1	0–1	1–0	1−0
vs. Marshall	1−0	0−1	1–0	0−1	–	0–1	1−0	0–2	0–1	0–1	1–0	0–1	1–0	2−0
vs. Middle Tennessee	1−0	1−0	1–0	1−0	1–0	–	1−0	1–0	1–0	0–2	2–0	1–0	0–1	1−0
vs. North Texas	0−1	0−1	0–1	1−1	0–1	0–1	–	0–1	1–1	0–1	0–1	0–1	0–1	1−0
vs. Old Dominion	1−1	1−0	0–1	1−0	2–0	0–1	1−0	–	0–1	0–1	0–1	0–1	1–0	1−0
vs. Rice	0−1	0−1	1–0	1−0	1–0	0–1	1−1	1–0	–	1–0	0–1	2–0	1–0	1−0
vs. Southern Miss	0−1	0−1	0–1	2−0	1–0	2–0	1−0	1–0	0−1	–	0–1	1–0	1–0	1−0
vs. UAB	1−0	1−0	1–1	1−0	0–1	0–2	1−0	1–0	1−0	1–0	–	0–1	0–1	0−1
vs. UTEP	1−0	1−0	1–0	1−0	1–0	0–1	1−0	1–0	0−2	0–1	1–0	–	1–1	1−0
vs. UTSA	1−0	1−0	1–0	0−1	0–1	1–0	1−0	0–1	0−1	0–1	1–0	1–1	–	1−0
vs. WKU	1−1	1−0	1–0	0−1	0–2	0–1	0−1	0–1	0−1	0–1	1–0	0–1	0−1	–
Total	9–6	8–6	7–8	11–4	8–7	3–12	12–3	7–8	5–10	5–10	7–8	5–10	6–8	11–4

== All-Conference Teams and Awards ==
Award	Recipients
Player of the Year	Javion Hamlet (North Texas)
Coach of the Year	Grant McCasland (North Texas)
Freshman of the Year	Jahmir Young (Charlotte)
Newcomer of the Year	Javion Hamlet (North Texas)
Defensive Player of the Year	Osasumwen Osaghae (FIU)
Sixth Player of the Year	Kalob Ledoux (Louisiana Tech)
First Team	DaQuan Bracey (Louisiana Tech); Javion Hamlet (North Texas); Bryson Williams (UTEP); Jhivvan Jackson (UTSA); Taveion Hollingsworth (Western Kentucky)
Second Team	Devon Andrews (FIU); Osasumwen Osaghae (FIU); Taevion Kinsey (Marshall); Umoja Gibson (North Texas); Keaton Wallace (UTSA)
Third Team	Jahmir Young (Charlotte); Jordan Shepherd (Charlotte); Jarrod West (Marshall); Carson Williams (Western Kentucky); Jared Savage (Western Kentucky)
All-Freshman Team	Jahmir Young (Charlotte); Andrew Taylor (Marshall); Tyson Jackson (Middle Tennessee); Jalen Benjamin (UAB); Jordan Rawls (Western Kentucky)
All-Defensive Team	Malik Martin (Charlotte); Osasumwen Osaghae (FIU); Derric Jean (Louisiana Tech); Jarrod West (Marshall); Aaron Carver (Old Dominion); Jared Savage (Western Kentucky)
