= 2019–20 Louisiana Tech Bulldogs basketball team =

American college basketball season

2019–20 Louisiana Tech Bulldogs basketball
- Conference: Conference USA
- Record: 22–8 (13–5 C-USA)
- Head coach: Eric Konkol (5th season)
- Assistant coaches: Duffy Conroy; Talvin Hester; Desmond Haymon
- Home arena: Thomas Assembly Center

2019–20 Conference USA men's basketball standings
	Conf.				Overall
Team	W		L	PCT	W		L	PCT
North Texas	14	–	4	.778	20	–	11	.645
Western Kentucky	13	–	5	.722	20	–	10	.667
Louisiana Tech	13	–	5	.722	22	–	8	.733
Charlotte	10	–	8	.556	16	–	13	.552
FIU	9	–	9	.500	19	–	13	.594
Marshall	10	–	8	.556	17	–	15	.531
UAB	9	–	9	.500	19	–	13	.594
Old Dominion	9	–	9	.500	13	–	19	.406
Florida Atlantic	8	–	10	.444	17	–	15	.531
UTSA	7	–	11	.389	13	–	19	.406
UTEP	8	–	10	.444	17	–	15	.531
Rice	7	–	11	.389	15	–	17	.469
Southern Miss	5	–	13	.278	9	–	22	.290
Middle Tennessee	4	–	14	.222	8	–	23	.258
Note: The 2020 C-USA tournament was canceled prior to the quarterfinals due to the COVID-19 pandemic.

The 2019–20 Louisiana Tech Bulldogs basketball team represented Louisiana Tech University in the 2019–20 NCAA Division I men's basketball season. The Bulldogs, led by fifth-year head coach Eric Konkol, played their home games at the Thomas Assembly Center in Ruston, Louisiana as members of Conference USA. They finished the season 22–8, 13–5 in C-USA play to finish in a tie for second place. They were set to be the No. 3 seed in the C-USA tournament. However, they C-USA Tournament was canceled amid the COVID-19 pandemic.

== Previous season ==
The Bulldogs finished the 2018–19 season 20–13 overall, 9–9 in C-USA play to finish in 8th place. In the C-USA tournament, they defeated Florida Atlantic in the first round, before falling to top-seeded Old Dominion in the quarterfinals.

== Offseason ==
=== Departures ===
Name	Number	Pos.	Height	Weight	Year	Hometown	Reason for departure
Anthony Duruji	4	F	6 ft 7 in	220 lbs	So	Germantown, Maryland	Transfer to Florida

=== Incoming transfers ===
Name	Number	Pos.	Height	Weight	Year	Hometown	Previous school
Andrew Gordon	33	F	6 ft 10 in	250 lbs	RS Jr	Clearwater, Florida	West Virginia

=== Recruiting class of 2019 ===
College recruiting information
Name	Hometown	School	Height	Weight	Commit date
			N/A	N/A	
Recruit ratings: No ratings found
Overall recruit ranking:
Note: In many cases, Scout, Rivals, 247Sports, On3, and ESPN may conflict in their listings of height and weight.; In these cases, the average was taken. ESPN grades are on a 100-point scale.; Sources: "2019 Team Ranking". Rivals.

== Roster ==
2019–20 Louisiana Tech Bulldogs men's basketball team
Players
Coaches

Pos.	#	Name	Height	Weight	Year	Previous school	Hometown
G	0	Lane Hartley (W)	6 ft 3 in (1.91 m)	185 lb (84 kg)	Jr	Bossier Parish CC	Chatham, Louisiana
G	1	Derric Jean	6 ft 2 in (1.88 m)	190 lb (86 kg)	RS Sr	McArthur HS	Miami, Florida
G	3	Amorie Archibald	6 ft 3 in (1.91 m)	180 lb (82 kg)	Jr	Trinity Christian Academy	Deltona, Florida
G	5	Kalob Ledoux	6 ft 4 in (1.93 m)	198 lb (90 kg)	RS Jr	McNeese State	Port Barre, Louisiana
G	10	Xaiver Armstead	6 ft 5 in (1.96 m)	200 lb (91 kg)	Jr	McLennan CC	Waco, Texas
G	11	JaColby Pemberton	6 ft 5 in (1.96 m)	190 lb (86 kg)	RS Jr	Lancaster HS	Dallas, Texas
F	13	Stacey Thomas	6 ft 8 in (2.03 m)	220 lb (100 kg)	So	Fortbend Christian Home School	Houston, Texas
G	21	Exavian Christon	6 ft 4 in (1.93 m)	200 lb (91 kg)	Jr	Hot Springs HS	Hot Springs, Arkansas
F	22	Isaiah Crawford	6 ft 6 in (1.98 m)	220 lb (100 kg)	Fr	North Crowley HS	Fort Worth, Texas
F	23	Mubarak Muhammed	6 ft 7 in (2.01 m)	220 lb (100 kg)	Sr	Bossier Parish CC	Suleja, Nigeria
G	24	Cobe Williams	5 ft 11 in (1.8 m)	175 lb (79 kg)	Fr	Kimball HS	Dallas, Texas
G	25	DaQuan Bracey	5 ft 11 in (1.8 m)	175 lb (79 kg)	Sr	St. Frances Academy	Baltimore, Maryland
F	33	Andrew Gordon	6 ft 10 in (2.08 m)	250 lb (113 kg)	RS Jr	West Virginia	Clearwater, Florida
F	35	Oliver Powell	6 ft 8 in (2.03 m)	235 lb (107 kg)	Sr	Rowlett HS	Rowlett, Texas
F	40	Kale Walters (W)	6 ft 7 in (2.01 m)	195 lb (88 kg)	So	Lindale HS	Lindale, Texas

Head coach

- Eric Konkol (UW–Eau Claire)

Assistant coach(es)

- Duffy Conroy (St. Ambrose)
- Talvin Hester (Texas Wesleyan)
- Desmond Haymon (Stephen F. Austin)

Legend

- (C) Team captain
- (S) Suspended
- (I) Ineligible
- (W) Walk-on
- Injured
- Current redshirt

Roster
Last update: January 13, 2020

== Schedule and results ==
Date time, TV	Rank^{#}	Opponent^{#}	Result	Record	Site (attendance) city, state
Exhibition
November 2, 2019*; 4:00 pm		No. 22 LSU; Hoops 4 Disaster Relief	L 70–83		Thomas Assembly Center (6,832); Ruston, LA
Non-conference regular season
November 6, 2019*; 7:00 pm, KDF		at Texas A&M–Corpus Christi	W 82–49	1–0	American Bank Center (1,027); Corpus Christi, TX
November 12, 2019*; 6:30 pm, CUSA.tv		Wiley	W 98–52	2–0	Thomas Assembly Center (1,528); Ruston, LA
November 16, 2019*; 5:00 pm, FS2		at Creighton	L 72–82	2–1	CHI Health Center Omaha (16,919); Omaha, NE
November 19, 2019*; 6:30 pm, CUSA.tv		Mississippi Valley State	W 76–43	3–1	Thomas Assembly Center (1,483); Ruston, LA
November 22, 2019*; 6:30 pm, CUSA.tv		North Alabama	W 82–61	4–1	Thomas Assembly Center (1,622); Ruston, LA
November 25, 2019*; 7:30 pm, BTN		at Indiana	L 75–88	4–2	Simon Skjodt Assembly Hall (11,930); Bloomington, IN
November 30, 2019*; 8:00 pm, CUSA.tv		Samford	W 78–57	5–2	Thomas Assembly Center (2,033); Ruston, LA
December 5, 2019*; 7:00 pm, SECN+		at Mississippi State	W 74–67	6–2	Humphrey Coliseum (6,375); Starkville, MS
December 8, 2019*; 4:30 pm, ESPN+		at Sam Houston State	L 68–71	6–3	Bernard Johnson Coliseum (731); Huntsville, TX
December 14, 2019*; 4:00 pm, CUSA.tv		Louisiana	W 77–59	7–3	Thomas Assembly Center (4,032); Ruston, LA
December 17, 2019*; 6:30 pm, CUSA.tv		North Carolina Central	W 69–60	8–3	Thomas Assembly Center (2,156); Ruston, LA
December 21, 2019*; 4:00 pm, CUSA.tv		SUNO	W 87–47	9–3	Thomas Assembly Center (1,530); Ruston, LA
Conference USA regular season
December 30, 2019; 7:00 pm, ESPN+		at Southern Miss	W 80–49	10–3 (1–0)	Reed Green Coliseum (3,005); Hattiesburg, MS
January 4, 2020; 4:00 pm, ESPN+		Southern Miss	W 78–50	11–3 (2–0)	Thomas Assembly Center (2,341); Ruston, LA
January 9, 2020; 6:00 pm, ESPNU		at UTSA	L 73–89	11–4 (2–1)	Convocation Center (922); San Antonio, TX
January 11, 2020; 8:00 pm, ESPN+		at UTEP	W 64–61	12–4 (3–1)	Don Haskins Center (5,731); El Paso, TX
January 16, 2020; 6:30 pm, ESPN+		Rice	W 72–56	13–4 (4–1)	Thomas Assembly Center (2,467); Ruston, LA
January 18, 2020; 4:00 pm, ESPN+		North Texas	L 50–51	13–5 (4–2)	Thomas Assembly Center (3,213); Ruston, LA
January 23, 2020; 6:30 pm, ESPN+		at Middle Tennessee	W 80–73	14–5 (5–2)	Murphy Center (3,047); Murfreesboro, TN
January 25, 2020; 2:00 pm, ESPN+		at UAB	W 72–58	15–5 (6–2)	Bartow Arena (2,732); Birmingham, AL
January 30, 2020; 6:30 pm, ESPN+		Charlotte	W 72–59	16–5 (7–2)	Thomas Assembly Center (2,930); Ruston, LA
February 1, 2020; 4:00 pm, ESPN+		Old Dominion	W 76–73	17–5 (8–2)	Thomas Assembly Center (3,763); Ruston, LA
February 6, 2020; 8:00 pm, CBSSN		at Western Kentucky	L 54–65	17–6 (8–3)	E. A. Diddle Arena (5,769); Bowling Green, KY
February 8, 2020; 6:00 pm, ESPN+		at Marshall	L 79–83 ^{OT}	17–7 (8–4)	Cam Henderson Center (6,531); Huntington, WV
February 13, 2020; 6:30 pm, ESPN+		FIU	W 60–57	18–7 (9–4)	Thomas Assembly Center (2,951); Ruston, LA
February 15, 2020; 2:00 pm, ESPN+		Florida Atlantic	W 81–68	19–7 (10–4)	Thomas Assembly Center (4,186); Ruston, LA
February 22, 2020; 3:00 pm, Stadium		at North Texas	W 73–71	20–7 (11–4)	The Super Pit (4,277); Denton, TX
February 27, 2020; 7:00 pm, CBSSN		at Western Kentucky	L 91–95 ^{OT}	20–8 (11–5)	E. A. Diddle Arena (5,030); Bowling Green, KY
March 4, 2020; 6:30 pm, C-USA.tv		FIU	W 76–73	21–8 (12–5)	Thomas Assembly Center (2,631); Ruston, LA
March 7, 2020; 6:00 pm, C-USA.tv		Charlotte	W 66–43	22–8 (13–5)	Thomas Assembly Center (3,359); Ruston, LA
Conference USA tournament
March 12, 2020; 9:00 pm, Facebook	(3)	vs. (6) Marshall; Quarterfinals	C-USA Tournament Canceled		Ford Center at The Star; Frisco, TX
*Non-conference game. ^{#}Rankings from AP Poll. (#) Tournament seedings in parentheses. All times are in Central.
