= 2019–20 Western Kentucky Hilltoppers basketball team =

American college basketball season

2019–20 Western Kentucky Hilltoppers basketball
- Conference: Conference USA
- Record: 20–10 (13–5 C-USA)
- Head coach: Rick Stansbury (4th season)
- Assistant coaches: Hennssy Auriantal; Phil Cunningham; Marcus Grant
- Home arena: E. A. Diddle Arena

2019–20 Conference USA men's basketball standings
	Conf.				Overall
Team	W		L	PCT	W		L	PCT
North Texas	14	–	4	.778	20	–	11	.645
Western Kentucky	13	–	5	.722	20	–	10	.667
Louisiana Tech	13	–	5	.722	22	–	8	.733
Charlotte	10	–	8	.556	16	–	13	.552
FIU	9	–	9	.500	19	–	13	.594
Marshall	10	–	8	.556	17	–	15	.531
UAB	9	–	9	.500	19	–	13	.594
Old Dominion	9	–	9	.500	13	–	19	.406
Florida Atlantic	8	–	10	.444	17	–	15	.531
UTSA	7	–	11	.389	13	–	19	.406
UTEP	8	–	10	.444	17	–	15	.531
Rice	7	–	11	.389	15	–	17	.469
Southern Miss	5	–	13	.278	9	–	22	.290
Middle Tennessee	4	–	14	.222	8	–	23	.258
Note: The 2020 C-USA tournament was canceled prior to the quarterfinals due to the COVID-19 pandemic.

The 2019–20 Western Kentucky Hilltoppers men's basketball team represented Western Kentucky University during the 2019–20 NCAA Division I men's basketball season. The Hilltoppers were led by head coach Rick Stansbury in his fourth season and played their home games at E. A. Diddle Arena in Bowling Green, Kentucky as fifth-year members of Conference USA. They finished the season 20–10, 13–5 in C-USA play to finish in a tie for second place. They were set to be the No. 2 seed in the C-USA tournament. However, the C-USA Tournament was canceled amid the COVID-19 pandemic.

== Previous season ==
The Hilltoppers finished the 2018–19 season with 20–14, 11–7 in C-USA play to finish in second place. They defeated North Texas and Southern Miss to advance to the championship game of the C-USA tournament where they lost to Old Dominion.

== Roster ==
2019–20 WKU Hilltoppers men's basketball team
Players
Coaches

Pos.	#	Name	Height	Weight	Year	Previous school	Hometown
G/F	2	Jared Savage	6 ft 5 in (1.96 m)	205 lb (93 kg)	Sr	Warren Central HS; Austin Peay	Bowling Green, KY
G	3	Jordan Rawls	6 ft 1 in (1.85 m)	165 lb (75 kg)	Fr	Hamilton Heights Christian Academy	Chattanooga, TN
G	4	Josh Anderson	6 ft 6 in (1.98 m)	195 lb (88 kg)	Jr	Madison Preparatory Academy	Baton Rouge, LA
G	5	Camron Justice	6 ft 3 in (1.91 m)	185 lb (84 kg)	Sr	Knott County Central HS; Vanderbilt; IUPUI	Hindman, KY
G	10	Jeremiah Gambrell	6 ft 2 in (1.88 m)	180 lb (82 kg)	RS Fr	Madison HS	Houston, TX
G	11	Taveion Hollingsworth	6 ft 2 in (1.88 m)	165 lb (75 kg)	Jr	Paul Laurence Dunbar HS	Lexington, KY
G	12	Jackson Harlan	6 ft 3 in (1.91 m)	190 lb (86 kg)	Fr	Clinton County HS	Albany, KY
F	14	Matt Horton	6 ft 11 in (2.11 m)	230 lb (104 kg)	Sr	Paul W. Bryant HS; Shelton State CC	Tuscaloosa, AL
G	15	Patrick Murphy	6 ft 5 in (1.96 m)	180 lb (82 kg)	RS Jr	Independence HS; Martin Methodist	Franklin, TN
G	21	Kenny Cooper	6 ft 0 in (1.83 m)	190 lb (86 kg)	Sr	Franklin Road Academy; Lipscomb	Nashville, TN
F	22	Carson Williams	6 ft 5 in (1.96 m)	230 lb (104 kg)	RS Jr	Owen County HS; Northern Kentucky	Owenton, KY
C	23	Charles Bassey	6 ft 11 in (2.11 m)	230 lb (104 kg)	So	St. Anthony Catholic HS; Aspire Academy	Lagos, Nigeria
F	50	Isaiah Cozart	6 ft 7 in (2.01 m)	225 lb (102 kg)	Fr	Madison Central HS	Richmond, KY

Head coach

- Rick Stansbury (Campbellsville)

Assistant coach(es)

- Hennssy Auriantal (Wisconsin)
- Phil Cunningham (Campbellsville)
- Nikita Johnson (Mississippi State)

Legend

- (C) Team captain
- (S) Suspended
- (I) Ineligible
- (W) Walk-on
- Injured
- Current redshirt

Roster
Last update: October 25, 2019

== Schedule and results ==
Date time, TV	Rank^{#}	Opponent^{#}	Result	Record	Site (attendance) city, state
Exhibition
Nov 2, 2019*; 7:30 pm		Kentucky State	W 85–45		E. A. Diddle Arena; Bowling Green, KY
Dec 17, 2019*; 7:00 pm, ESPN3		Kentucky Wesleyan; BB&T Classic	W 75–53		E.A. Diddle Arena; Bowling Green, KY
Non-conference regular season
Nov 5, 2019*; 7:00 pm, ESPN3		Tennessee Tech	W 76–64	1–0	E.A. Diddle Arena (4,841); Bowling Green, KY
Nov 9, 2019*; 3:00 pm, ESPN3		Austin Peay	W 97–75	2–0	E.A. Diddle Arena (4,907); Bowling Green, KY
Nov 15, 2019*; 6:00 pm, ESPN+		at Eastern Kentucky	W 79–71	3–0	McBrayer Arena (5,826); Richmond, KY
Nov 18, 2019*; 7:00 pm, ESPN3		Campbellsville; Paradise Jam on-campus game	W 109–66	4–0	E.A. Diddle Arena (4,134); Bowling Green, KY
Nov 22, 2019*; 8:00 pm, FloHoops		vs. Bowling Green; Paradise Jam quarterfinal	L 75–77	4–1	Sports and Fitness Center (1,924); St. Thomas, USVI
Nov 23, 2019*; 5:00 pm, FloHoops		vs. Illinois State; Paradise Jam consolation 2nd round	W 83–69	5–1	Sports and Fitness Center (2,024); St. Thomas, USVI
Nov 25, 2019*; 3:15 pm, FloHoops		vs. Fordham; Paradise Jam 5th place game	W 69–64	6–1	Sports and Fitness Center; St. Thomas, USVI
Nov 29, 2019*; 4:00 pm, CBSSN Facebook		vs. No. 2 Louisville	L 54–71	6–2	Bridgestone Arena (12,863); Nashville, TN
Dec 3, 2019*; 6:00 pm, ESPN+		at Wright State	L 74–76	6–3	Nutter Center (3,178); Dayton, OH
Dec 7, 2019*; 6:30 pm, CBSSN		Arkansas	W 86–79 ^{OT}	7–3	E.A. Diddle Arena (6,862); Bowling Green, KY
Dec 21, 2019*; 1:00 pm, ESPN+		at Rhode Island	L 82–86 ^{OT}	7–4	Ryan Center (5,325); Kington, RI
Dec 28, 2019*; 6:30 pm, Stadium		Belmont	L 62–79	7–5	E.A. Diddle Arena (5,102); Bowling Green, KY
C-USA regular season
Jan 2, 2020; 6:00 pm, ESPNU		North Texas	W 93–84	8–5 (1–0)	E.A. Diddle Arena (3,716); Bowling Green, KY
Jan 4, 2020; 4:00 pm, ESPN3		Rice	W 68–61	9–5 (2–0)	E.A. Diddle Arena (4,619); Bowling Green, KY
Jan 9, 2020; 7:00 pm, Stadium		at UAB	L 62–72	9–6 (2–1)	Bartow Arena (2,305); Birmingham, AL
Jan 11, 2020; 5:00 pm, CBSSN		at Middle Tennessee	W 69–53	10–6 (3–1)	Murphy Center (3,176); Murfreesboro, TN
Jan 16, 2020; 7:00 pm, CBSSN		Old Dominion	W 71–69	11–6 (4–1)	E.A. Diddle Arena (3,816); Bowling Green, KY
Jan 18, 2020; 5:00 pm, ESPN3		Charlotte	W 80–63	12–6 (5–1)	E.A. Diddle Arena (4,677); Bowling Green, KY
Jan 22, 2020; 6:00 pm, Stadium Facebook		at Marshall	W 64–60	13–6 (6–1)	Cam Henderson Center (5,612); Huntington, WV
Jan 25, 2020; 6:30 pm, Stadium Facebook		Marshall	W 91–84	14–6 (7–1)	E.A. Diddle Arena (6,270); Bowling Green, KY
Jan 30, 2020; 6:00 pm, Stadium Facebook		at Florida Atlantic	L 65–69	14–7 (7–2)	RoofClaim.com Arena (1,253); Boca Raton, FL
Feb 1, 2020; 11:00 am, Stadium Facebook		at FIU	L 76–81	14–8 (7–3)	Ocean Bank Convocation Center (695); Miami, FL
Feb 6, 2020; 8:00 pm, CBSSN		Louisiana Tech	W 65–54	15–8 (8–3)	E.A. Diddle Arena (5,769); Bowling Green, KY
Feb 8, 2020; 6:30 pm, Stadium Facebook		Southern Miss	W 75–72	16–8 (9–3)	E.A. Diddle Arena (6,170); Bowling Green, KY
Feb 13, 2020; 8:00 pm, Stadium Facebook		at UTEP	W 67–62	17–8 (10–3)	Don Haskins Center (4,504); El Paso, TX
Feb 15, 2020; 2:00 pm, CBSSN Facebook		at UTSA	W 77–73 ^{OT}	18–8 (11–3)	Convocation Center (1,576); San Antonio, TX
Feb 22, 2020; 6:00 pm, CBSSN		Charlotte	L 70–72	18–9 (11–4)	E.A. Diddle Arena (5,391); Bowling Green, KY
Feb 27, 2020; 7:00 pm, CBSSN		Louisiana Tech	W 95–91 ^{OT}	19–9 (12–4)	E.A. Diddle Arena (5,030); Bowling Green, KY
Mar 1, 2020; 1:00 pm, CBSSN		at North Texas	L 72–78 ^{OT}	19–10 (12–5)	UNT Coliseum (4,471); Denton, TX
Mar 7, 2020; 6:00 pm, CBSSN on Facebook		at FIU	W 91–85	20–10 (13–5)	Ocean Bank Convocation Center (1,014); Miami, FL
Conference USA Tournament
Mar 12, 2020; 8:30 pm, Stadium	(2)	vs. (7) UAB; Quarterfinals	C-USA Tournament Canceled		Ford Center at The Star; Frisco, TX
*Non-conference game. ^{#}Rankings from AP Poll. (#) Tournament seedings in parentheses. All times are in Central Time.
