= 2019–20 UAB Blazers men's basketball team =

American college basketball season

2019–20 UAB Blazers men's basketball
- Conference: Conference USA
- Record: 19–13 (9–9 C-USA)
- Head coach: Robert Ehsan (4th season)
- Assistant coaches: Turner Battle; Dannton Jackson; Kevin Devitt
- Home arena: Bartow Arena

2019–20 Conference USA men's basketball standings
| | Conf. | | | | Overall |
| Team | W | | L | PCT | W | | L | PCT |
|---|---|---|---|---|---|---|---|---|
| North Texas | 14 | – | 4 | .778 | 20 | – | 11 | .645 |
| Western Kentucky | 13 | – | 5 | .722 | 20 | – | 10 | .667 |
| Louisiana Tech | 13 | – | 5 | .722 | 22 | – | 8 | .733 |
| Charlotte | 10 | – | 8 | .556 | 16 | – | 13 | .552 |
| FIU | 9 | – | 9 | .500 | 19 | – | 13 | .594 |
| Marshall | 10 | – | 8 | .556 | 17 | – | 15 | .531 |
| UAB | 9 | – | 9 | .500 | 19 | – | 13 | .594 |
| Old Dominion | 9 | – | 9 | .500 | 13 | – | 19 | .406 |
| Florida Atlantic | 8 | – | 10 | .444 | 17 | – | 15 | .531 |
| UTSA | 7 | – | 11 | .389 | 13 | – | 19 | .406 |
| UTEP | 8 | – | 10 | .444 | 17 | – | 15 | .531 |
| Rice | 7 | – | 11 | .389 | 15 | – | 17 | .469 |
| Southern Miss | 5 | – | 13 | .278 | 9 | – | 22 | .290 |
| Middle Tennessee | 4 | – | 14 | .222 | 8 | – | 23 | .258 |
Note: The 2020 C-USA tournament was canceled prior to the quarterfinals due to the COVID-19 pandemic.

The 2019–20 UAB Blazers basketball team represented the University of Alabama at Birmingham during the 2019–20 NCAA Division I men's basketball season. The Blazers, led by fourth-year head coach Robert Ehsan, play their home games at the Bartow Arena as members of Conference USA.

== Offseason ==
=== Departures ===
| Name | Number | Pos. | Height | Weight | Year | Hometown | Reason for departure |
|---|---|---|---|---|---|---|---|
| Zack Bryant | 1 | G | 6'2" | 183 | Sophomore | Hastings, FL | Dismissed from team after 3 games |
| Jeremiah Bell | 2 | G | 6'0" | 171 | Senior | Louisville, KY | Graduated |
| Anderson McCoy | 4 | G | 5'11" | 171 | RS Junior | Indianapolis, Indiana | Graduate transferred to Delta State University |
| Jalen Perry | 21 | G | 6'3" | 197 | Senior | Louisville, KY | Graduated |
| Lewis Sullivan | 23 | F | 6'7" | 231 | Senior | Hazel Green, AL | Graduated |
| Will Bathurst | 25 | G | 6'3" | 188 | RS Senior | Olean, NY | Graduated |
| Nolan Bertain | 32 | G | 6'4" | 188 | RS Sophomore | Portland, OR | Transferred to Texas A&M–Corpus Christi |

=== Incoming transfers ===
| Name | Number | Pos. | Height | Weight | Year | Hometown | Previous School |
|---|---|---|---|---|---|---|---|
| Kassim Nicholson | 11 | F | 6'7" | 200 | Junior | Jackson, MS | Junior college transferred from Holmes CC |
| Rashawn Fredericks | 32 | G | 6'5" | 200 | Senior | St. Croix | Transferred from Cincinnati. Under NCAA transfer rules, Fredericks will have to sit out for the 2019–20 season. Will have one year of remaining eligibility. |

== Roster ==
2018–19 UAB Blazers men's basketball team
Players
Coaches

| Pos. | # | Name | Height | Weight | Year | Previous school | Hometown |
|---|---|---|---|---|---|---|---|
| G | 0 | Tyreek Scott-Grayson | 6 ft 5 in (1.96 m) | 177 lb (80 kg) | Jr | Suffield Academy; State Fair Community College | Brick, New Jersey |
| F | 2 | Tamell Pearson | 6 ft 10 in (2.08 m) | 223 lb (101 kg) | So | Morgan Park High School | Chicago, Illinois |
| G | 3 | Tavin Lovan | 6 ft 4 in (1.93 m) | 196 lb (89 kg) | So | Franklin-Simpson High School | Franklin, Kentucky |
| G | 4 | Jahein Spencer | 6 ft 4 in (1.93 m) | 220 lb (100 kg) | Fr | Madison Prep | Napoleonville, Louisiana |
| F | 5 | Makhtar Gueye | 6 ft 10 in (2.08 m) | 210 lb (95 kg) | Jr | Aspire Academy | Rufisque, Senegal |
| G | 10 | Luis Hurtado | 6 ft 6 in (1.98 m) | 210 lb (95 kg) | RS So | The Sagemont School | Mérida, Venezuela |
| G | 11 | Kassim Nicholson | 6 ft 7 in (2.01 m) | 200 lb (91 kg) | Jr | Callaway High School; Holmes CC | Jackson, MS |
| F | 12 | Will Butler | 6 ft 8 in (2.03 m) | 245 lb (111 kg) | Sr | Redemption Christian Academy; Pensacola State College | Troy, New York |
| G | 13 | Jalen Benjamin | 5 ft 10 in (1.78 m) | 140 lb (64 kg) | RS Fr | Meadowcreek High School | Raleigh, North Carolina |
| G | 15 | Joshua Sippial (W) | 6 ft 2 in (1.88 m) | 180 lb (82 kg) | So | Loveless Academic Magnet Program | Montgomery, Alabama |
| G | 21 | Jon Coleman | 5 ft 10 in (1.78 m) | 170 lb (77 kg) | Fr | Hall High School | Little Rock, Arkansas |
| G | 23 | Jordan Brinson | 6 ft 2 in (1.88 m) | 175 lb (79 kg) | Fr | Westchester High School | Inglewood, California |
| G | 25 | Antonio Ralat | 6 ft 2 in (1.88 m) | 200 lb (91 kg) | Sr | ELEV8 Sports Institute | San Juan, Puerto Rico |
| G | 32 | Rashawn Fredericks (redshirt) | 6 ft 5 in (1.96 m) | 200 lb (91 kg) | Sr | Cincinnati; State CC | St. Croix, Virgin Islands |
| F | 34 | Jude Akabueze | 6 ft 8 in (2.03 m) | 260 lb (118 kg) | RS Fr | North Marion High School | Lagos, Nigeria |

Head coach

- Robert Ehsan (UC Davis)

Assistant coach(es)

- Turner Battle (Buffalo)
- Dannton Jackson (Xavier (LA))
- Kevin Devitt (DePaul)

Legend

- (C) Team captain
- (S) Suspended
- (I) Ineligible
- (W) Walk-on
- Injured
- Current redshirt

Roster

== Schedule and results ==
| Date time, TV | Rank^{#} | Opponent^{#} | Result | Record | Site (attendance) city, state |
Exhibition
| Nov 1, 2019*; 7:00 pm | | Morehouse | W 78–61 | | Bartow Arena (2,337); Birmingham, AL |
Non-conference regular season
| Nov 7, 2019*; 7:00 pm, ESPN+ | | at Troy | W 76–75 | 1–0 | Trojan Arena (5,010); Troy, AL |
| Nov 11, 2019*; 7:00 pm, CUSA.TV | | Alabama A&M | W 74–52 | 2–0 | Bartow Arena (2,880); Birmingham, AL |
| Nov 15, 2019*; 7:00 pm, CUSA.TV | | Utah Valley; BBN Showcase | L 55–66 | 2–1 | Bartow Arena (2,532); Birmingham, AL |
| Nov 20, 2019*; 7:00 pm, CUSA.TV | | Mount St. Mary's; BBN Showcase | W 58–51 | 3–1 | Bartow Arena (2,667); Birmingham, AL |
| Nov 26, 2019*; 7:00 pm, CUSA.TV | | Lamar; BBN Showcase | W 57–48 | 4–1 | Bartow Arena (2,187); Birmingham, AL |
| Nov 29, 2019*; 6:00 pm, SECN | | at No. 9 Kentucky; BBN Showcase | L 58–69 | 4–2 | Rupp Arena (20,401); Lexington, KY |
| Dec 3, 2019*; 7:00 pm, LHN | | at Texas | L 57–67 | 4–3 | Frank Erwin Center (14,552); Austin, TX |
| Dec 7, 2019*; 4:30 pm, CBSSN | | No. 15 Memphis; Bartow Classic | L 57–65 | 4–4 | Bartow Arena (5,041); Birmingham, AL |
| Dec 14, 2019*; 7:30 pm, CUSA.TV | | Montevallo | W 75–63 | 5–4 | Bartow Arena (2,340); Birmingham, AL |
| Dec 17, 2019*; 7:00 pm, CUSA.TV | | North Alabama | W 63–56 | 6–4 | Bartow Arena (2,455); Birmingham, AL |
| Dec 21, 2019*; 4:00 pm | | vs. Alabama State; St. Pete Shootout | W 71–63 | 7–4 | McArthur Center (176); St. Petersburg, FL |
| Dec 22, 2019*; 1:30 pm | | vs. Duquesne; St. Pete Shootout | W 77–68 | 8–4 | McArthur Center (301); St. Petersburg, FL |
| Dec 28, 2019*; 1:00 pm, CUSA.TV | | Thomas (GA) | W 82–49 | 9–4 | Bartow Arena (2,294); Birmingham, AL |
Conference USA regular season
| Jan 2, 2020; 6:00 pm, ESPN+ | | at Charlotte | L 44–51 | 9–5 (0–1) | Dale F. Halton Arena (3,015); Charlotte, NC |
| Jan 4, 2020; 6:00 pm, ESPN+ | | at Old Dominion | L 52–58 | 9–6 (0–2) | Chartway Arena (6,494); Norfolk, VA |
| Jan 9, 2020; 7:00 pm, Stadium/Facebook | | Western Kentucky | W 72–62 | 10–6 (1–2) | Bartow Arena (2,385); Birmingham, AL |
| Jan 11, 2020; 2:00 pm, Stadium | | Marshall | W 61–50 | 11–6 (2–2) | Bartow Arena (2,542); Birmingham, AL |
| Jan 16, 2020; 6:00 pm, ESPN+ | | at FIU | L 68–93 | 11–7 (2–3) | Ocean Bank Convocation Center (915); Miami, FL |
| Jan 18, 2020; 3:00 pm, ESPN+ | | at Florida Atlantic | W 68–65 | 12–7 (3–3) | RoofClaim.com Arena (1,314); Boca Raton, FL |
| Jan 23, 2020; 7:00 pm, ESPN+ | | Southern Miss | L 77–84 | 12–8 (3–4) | Bartow Arena (2,705); Birmingham, AL |
| Jan 25, 2020; 2:00 pm, ESPN+ | | Louisiana Tech | L 58–72 | 12–9 (3–5) | Bartow Arena (2,732); Birmingham, AL |
| Jan 30, 2020; 6:00 pm, Stadium | | at UTSA | W 76–68 | 13–9 (4–5) | Convocation Center (1,389); San Antonio, TX |
| Feb 1, 2020; 8:00 pm, ESPN+ | | at UTEP | W 69–55 | 14–9 (5–5) | Don Haskins Center (6,234); El Paso, TX |
| Feb 6, 2020; 7:00 pm, ESPN+ | | Rice | L 72–86 | 14–10 (5–6) | Bartow Arena (3,032); Birmingham, AL |
| Feb 8, 2020; 1:00 pm, ESPN+ | | North Texas | L 64–71 | 14–11 (5–7) | Bartow Arena (2,925); Birmingham, AL |
| Feb 12, 2020; 7:00 pm, ESPN+ | | Middle Tennessee | W 83–72 | 15–11 (6–7) | Bartow Arena (2,461); Birmingham, AL |
| Feb 15, 2020; 2:00 pm, ESPN+ | | at Middle Tennessee | W 79–66 | 16–11 (7–7) | Murphy Center (3,964); Murfreesboro, TN |
| Feb 22, 2020; 6:00 pm, CUSA.TV | | at Florida Atlantic | L 58–65 | 16–12 (7–8) | RoofClaim.com Arena (914); Boca Raton, FL |
| Feb 27, 2020; 7:00 pm, CUSA.TV | | Marshall | W 88–80 | 17–12 (8–8) | Bartow Arena (2,432); Birmingham, AL |
| Mar 1, 2020; 2:00 pm, CUSA.TV | | at UTSA | L 59–66 | 17–13 (8–9) | Convocation Center (1,165); San Antonio, TX |
| Mar 7, 2020; 7:00 pm, CUSA.TV | | Old Dominion | W 72–63 | 18–13 (9–9) | Bartow Arena; Birmingham, AL |
Conference USA tournament
| Mar 11, 2020; 8:30 pm, ESPN+ | (7) | vs. (10) UTSA; First round | W 74–69 | 19–13 | Ford Center at The Star; Frisco, TX |
| March 12, 2020; 8:30 pm, Stadium | (7) | vs. (2) Western Kentucky; Second round | C-USA Tournament Canceled | | Ford Center at The Star; Frisco, TX |
*Non-conference game. ^{#}Rankings from AP Poll. (#) Tournament seedings in parentheses. All times are in Central Time.
