= 2019–20 UTEP Miners men's basketball team =

American college basketball season

2019–20 UTEP Miners men's basketball

Sun Bowl Invitational champions
- Conference: Conference USA
- Record: 17–15 (8–10 C-USA)
- Head coach: Rodney Terry (2nd season)
- Assistant coaches: Arturo Ormond; Kenton Paulino; Nick Matson
- Home arena: Don Haskins Center

2019–20 Conference USA men's basketball standings
	Conf.				Overall
Team	W		L	PCT	W		L	PCT
North Texas	14	–	4	.778	20	–	11	.645
Western Kentucky	13	–	5	.722	20	–	10	.667
Louisiana Tech	13	–	5	.722	22	–	8	.733
Charlotte	10	–	8	.556	16	–	13	.552
FIU	9	–	9	.500	19	–	13	.594
Marshall	10	–	8	.556	17	–	15	.531
UAB	9	–	9	.500	19	–	13	.594
Old Dominion	9	–	9	.500	13	–	19	.406
Florida Atlantic	8	–	10	.444	17	–	15	.531
UTSA	7	–	11	.389	13	–	19	.406
UTEP	8	–	10	.444	17	–	15	.531
Rice	7	–	11	.389	15	–	17	.469
Southern Miss	5	–	13	.278	9	–	22	.290
Middle Tennessee	4	–	14	.222	8	–	23	.258
Note: The 2020 C-USA tournament was canceled prior to the quarterfinals due to the COVID-19 pandemic.

The 2019–20 UTEP Miners basketball team represented the University of Texas at El Paso during the 2019–20 NCAA Division I men's basketball season. The Miners, led by second-year head coach Rodney Terry, played their home games at the Don Haskins Center as members of Conference USA. UTEP averaged 5,311 fans per game.

== Previous season ==
The Miners finished the 2018–19 season 8–21, 3–15 in C-USA play to finish in last place. They failed to qualify for the C-USA Tournament.

== Roster ==
2019–20 UTEP Miners men's basketball team
Players
Coaches

Pos.	#	Name	Height	Weight	Year	Previous school	Hometown
G	0	Souley Boum	6 ft 3 in (1.91 m)	163 lb (74 kg)	RS So	Oakland Tech HS; San Francisco	Oakland, CA
F	1	Tydus Verhoeven	6 ft 9 in (2.06 m)	225 lb (102 kg)	RS So	Manteca HS; Duquesne	Manteca, CA
G	2	Jordan Lathon	6 ft 4 in (1.93 m)	190 lb (86 kg)	So	Grandview HS	Grandview, MO
G/F	3	Anthony Tarke	6 ft 6 in (1.98 m)	220 lb (100 kg)	RS Jr	Gaithersburg HS; NJIT	Gaithersburg, MD
F	4	Eric Vila	6 ft 11 in (2.11 m)	221 lb (100 kg)	RS Jr	NW Florida State	Girona, Spain
G	5	Deon Stroud	6 ft 5 in (1.96 m)	197 lb (89 kg)	Fr	Trinity International HS	Fresno, CA
F	11	Bryson Williams	6 ft 8 in (2.03 m)	228 lb (103 kg)	RS Jr	Roosevelt HS; Fresno State	Fresno, CA
G	12	Jules Williamson	6 ft 4 in (1.93 m)	180 lb (82 kg)	Fr	East Aurora HS	Aurora, IL
G	13	Ountae Campbell (W)	6 ft 4 in (1.93 m)	199 lb (90 kg)	RS Sr	Brentwood HS; Casper College	Los Angeles, CA
G	15	Kaden Archie	6 ft 6 in (1.98 m)	210 lb (95 kg)	So	Midlothian HS; TCU	Midlothian, TX
G	20	Anieus Modrano	5 ft 11 in (1.8 m)	185 lb (84 kg)	Jr	Liberty HS; Bakersfield College	Bakersfield, CA
G	21	Keonte Kennedy	6 ft 5 in (1.96 m)	180 lb (82 kg)	So	Westlake HS; Xavier	Austin, TX
G	23	Nigel Hawkins	6 ft 4 in (1.93 m)	198 lb (90 kg)	So	Cypress Falls HS	Houston, TX
G	24	Daryl Edwards	6 ft 3 in (1.91 m)	185 lb (84 kg)	Sr	Central HS; LSU	Fresno, CA
F	32	Efe Odigie	6 ft 9 in (2.06 m)	255 lb (116 kg)	So	Pro-Vision School	Houston, TX
F	33	Gilles Dekoninck (W)	6 ft 6 in (1.98 m)	205 lb (93 kg)	Jr	Huntington Prep; Fresno State	Diest, Belgium
C	54	Isaiah Rhyanes (W)	6 ft 9 in (2.06 m)	229 lb (104 kg)	RS Sr	Andress HS; El Paso CC	El Paso, TX

Head coach

- Rodney Terry (St. Edward's)

Assistant coach(es)

- Kenton Paulino (Texas)
- Nick Matson (VMI)
- Arturo Ormond (Texas–Pan American)

Legend

- (C) Team captain
- (S) Suspended
- (I) Ineligible
- (W) Walk-on
- Injured
- Current redshirt

Roster
Last update: February 13, 2020

== Schedule and results ==
Date time, TV	Rank^{#}	Opponent^{#}	Result	Record	Site (attendance) city, state
Non-conference regular season
Nov 5, 2019*; 7:00 pm		New Mexico Highlands	W 93–70	1–0	Don Haskins Center (3,738); El Paso, TX
Nov 12, 2019*; 7:00 pm		New Mexico State; Battle of I-10	W 65–50	2–0	Don Haskins Center (8,993); El Paso, TX
Nov 14, 2019*; 6:00 pm		Eastern New Mexico	W 71–57	3–0	Don Haskins Center (4,476); El Paso, TX
Nov 19, 2019*; 7:00 pm		New Mexico	W 66–63	4–0	Don Haskins Center (6,171); El Paso, TX
Nov 27, 2019*; 7:00 pm		East Central	W 91–71	5–0	Don Haskins Center (5,531); El Paso, TX
Dec 3, 2019*; 7:00 pm		at New Mexico State; Battle of I-10	L 56–59	5–1	Pan American Center (7,048); Las Cruces, NM
Dec 7, 2019*; 7:00 pm		Arkansas–Pine Bluff	W 59–50	6–1	Don Haskins Center (4,928); El Paso, TX
Dec 16, 2019*; 7:00 pm		North Carolina A&T; Sun Bowl Invitational	W 72–54	7–1	Don Haskins Center (5,969); El Paso, TX
Dec 17, 2019*; 7:00 pm		UC Irvine; Sun Bowl Invitational	W 67–61	8–1	Don Haskins Center (6,934); El Paso, TX
Dec 19, 2019*; 6:00 pm, ESPN3		at Houston; Hawaiian Airlines Diamond Head Classic non bracket game	L 57–77	8–2	Fertitta Center (6,470); Houston, TX
Dec 22, 2019*; 9:30 pm, ESPN2		at Hawaii; Diamond Head Classic quarterfinal	L 63–67	8–3	Stan Sheriff Center (6,179); Honolulu, HI
Dec 23, 2019*; 11:30 pm, ESPNU		vs. Ball State; Diamond Head Classic consolation 2nd round	W 71–70	9–3	Stan Sheriff Center (5,757); Honolulu, HI
Dec 25, 2019*; 1:30 pm, ESPNU		vs. Boise State; Diamond Head Classic 5th place game	L 67–72	9–4	Stan Sheriff Center; Honolulu, HI
Conference USA regular season
Jan 2, 2020; 10:00 am, ESPN+		at FIU	L 67–69	9–5 (0–1)	Ocean Bank Convocation Center (525); University Park, FL
Jan 4, 2020; 2:00 pm, ESPN+		at Florida Atlantic	L 56–59	9–6 (0–2)	RoofClaim.com Arena (830); Boca Raton, FL
Jan 9, 2020; 7:00 pm, ESPN+		Southern Miss	W 76–64	10–6 (1–2)	Don Haskins Center (4,622); El Paso, TX
Jan 11, 2020; 7:00 pm, ESPN+		Louisiana Tech	L 61–64	10–7 (1–3)	Don Haskins Center (5,731); El Paso, TX
Jan 15, 2020; 7:00 pm, ESPN+		UTSA	W 80–77 ^{OT}	11–7 (2–3)	Don Haskins Center (4,442); El Paso, TX
Jan 18, 2020; 2:00 pm, ESPN3		at UTSA	L 70–86	11–8 (2–4)	Convocation Center (1,684); San Antonio, TX
Jan 23, 2020; 6:00 pm, ESPN+		at Rice	W 72–64	12–8 (3–4)	Tudor Fieldhouse (1,518); Houston, TX
Jan 25, 2020; 4:00 pm, ESPN+		at North Texas	L 57–67	12–9 (3–5)	UNT Coliseum (4,092); Denton, TX
Jan 30, 2020; 7:00 pm, ESPN+		Middle Tennessee	W 67–66	13–9 (4–5)	Don Haskins Center (4,471); El Paso, TX
Feb 1, 2020; 7:00 pm, ESPN+		UAB	L 55–69	13–10 (4–6)	Don Haskins Center (6,234); El Paso, TX
Feb 6, 2020; 5:00 pm, ESPN+		at Charlotte	L 64–68	13–11 (4–7)	Dale F. Halton Arena (2,828); Charlotte, NC
Feb 8, 2020; 5:00 pm, ESPN+		at Old Dominion	L 53–72	13–12 (4–8)	Chartway Arena (6,820); Norfolk, VA
Feb 13, 2020; 7:00 pm		Western Kentucky	L 62–67	13–13 (4–9)	Don Haskins Center (4,504); El Paso, TX
Feb 15, 2020; 2:00 pm, ESPN+		Marshall	L 61–71	13–14 (4–10)	Don Haskins Center (4,424); El Paso, TX
Feb 22, 2020; 5:00 pm, CUSA.tv		Rice	W 68–62	14–14 (5–10)	Don Haskins Center (4,139); El Paso, TX
Mar 1, 2020; 2:00 pm, CUSA.tv		Southern Miss	W 75–56	15–14 (6–10)	Don Haskins Center (4,975); El Paso, TX
Mar 4, 2020; 5:30 pm, ESPN3		at Middle Tennessee	W 60–56	16–14 (7–10)	Murphy Center (2,022); Murfreesboro, TN
Mar 7, 2020; 4:00 pm, CUSA.tv		at Rice	W 77–72	17–14 (8–10)	Tudor Fieldhouse (1,608); Houston, TX
Conference USA tournament
Mar 11, 2020; 8:00 pm, ESPN+	(11)	vs. (6) Marshall; First round	L 78–86	17–15	Ford Center at The Star (2,061); Frisco, TX
*Non-conference game. ^{#}Rankings from AP Poll. (#) Tournament seedings in parentheses. All times are in Mountain Time.
