= 2020 Conference USA men's basketball tournament =

- Classification: Division I
- Season: 2019–20
- Teams: 12
- Site: Ford Center at The Star; Frisco, Texas
- Television: Stadium, ESPN+, CBSSN

2019–20 Conference USA men's basketball standings
	Conf.				Overall
Team	W		L	PCT	W		L	PCT
North Texas	14	–	4	.778	20	–	11	.645
Western Kentucky	13	–	5	.722	20	–	10	.667
Louisiana Tech	13	–	5	.722	22	–	8	.733
Charlotte	10	–	8	.556	16	–	13	.552
FIU	9	–	9	.500	19	–	13	.594
Marshall	10	–	8	.556	17	–	15	.531
UAB	9	–	9	.500	19	–	13	.594
Old Dominion	9	–	9	.500	13	–	19	.406
Florida Atlantic	8	–	10	.444	17	–	15	.531
UTSA	7	–	11	.389	13	–	19	.406
UTEP	8	–	10	.444	17	–	15	.531
Rice	7	–	11	.389	15	–	17	.469
Southern Miss	5	–	13	.278	9	–	22	.290
Middle Tennessee	4	–	14	.222	8	–	23	.258
Note: The 2020 C-USA tournament was canceled prior to the quarterfinals due to the COVID-19 pandemic.

The 2020 Conference USA men's basketball tournament was to be the concluding event of the 2019–20 Conference USA (C-USA) men's basketball season. It was to be held from March 11–14, 2020 alongside the C-USA women's tournament in Frisco, Texas, at the Ford Center at The Star. The winner of the tournament was to receive the conference's automatic bid to the 2020 NCAA tournament. Only the first day of games were played before the tournament was cancelled due to the COVID-19 pandemic.

== Seeds ==
Only 12 conference teams play in the tournament. The top four teams receive a bye to the quarterfinals of the tournament. Teams are seeded within one of three groups. After each team had played 14 conference games, the teams were divided into groups based on conference record at that point in the season. The top five teams were placed in one group, the next five in a second group, and the bottom four in a final group. All teams were at that time locked into a seeding range that corresponded to their group—for example, the top five teams were assured the top five seeds. The remaining four conference games were played strictly within each group. The final seeding within each group is determined by overall conference record, with a tiebreaker system to seed teams with identical conference records. Only the top two teams within the bottom group enter the tournament.

Seed	School	Record	Tiebreaker
1	North Texas	14–4	
2	Western Kentucky	13–5	2–0 vs. Louisiana Tech
3	Louisiana Tech	13–5	0–2 vs. Western Kentucky
4	Charlotte	10–8	
5	FIU	9–9	
6	Marshall	10–8	
7	UAB	9–9	1–1 vs. Western Kentucky/Louisiana Tech
8	Old Dominion	9–9	0–2 vs. Western Kentucky/Louisiana Tech
9	Florida Atlantic	8–10	
10	UTSA	7–11	
11	UTEP	8–10	
12	Rice	7–11	
DNQ	Southern Miss	5–13	
DNQ	Middle Tennessee	4–14	

== Schedule ==
Rankings denote tournament seed.

Session	Game	Time	Matchup	Score	Television
First round – Wednesday, March 11
1	1	6:00 pm	No. 8 Old Dominion vs. No. 9 Florida Atlantic	56-66	ESPN+
1	2	6:30 pm	No. 5 FIU vs. No. 12 Rice	85-76	ESPN+
1	3	8:30 pm	No. 7 UAB vs. No. 10 UTSA	74-69	ESPN+
1	4	9:00 pm	No. 6 Marshall vs. No. 11 UTEP	86-78	ESPN+
Quarterfinals – Thursday, March 12
2	5	6:00 pm	No. 1 North Texas vs. No. 9 Florida Atlantic	cancelled	Stadium
2	6	6:30 pm	No. 4 Charlotte vs. No. 5 FIU	cancelled	Facebook
2	7	8:30 pm	No. 2 Western Kentucky vs. No. 7 UAB	cancelled	Stadium
2	8	9:00 pm	No. 3 Louisiana Tech vs. No. 6 Marshall	cancelled	Facebook
Semifinals – Friday, March 13
3	9	1:00 pm	game 5 winner vs. game 6 winner	cancelled	CBSSN
3	10	3:30 pm	game 7 winner vs. game 8 winner	cancelled	CBSSN
Championship – Saturday, March 14
4	11	7:30 pm	game 9 winner vs. game 10 winner	cancelled	CBSSN

== Bracket ==
First round Wednesday, March 11; ESPN+
8	Old Dominion	56
9	Florida Atlantic	66
5	Florida International	85
12	Rice	76
7	UAB	74
10	UTSA	69
6	Marshall	86
11	UTEP	78

Quarterfinals; Thursday, March 12; Stadium/Facebook
1	North Texas
9	Florida Atlantic
4	Charlotte
5	Florida International
2	Western Kentucky
7	UAB
3	Louisiana Tech
6	Marshall

Semifinals; Friday, March 13; CBSSN

Championship; Saturday, March 14; CBSSN

* denotes overtime period.

== See also ==
- 2020 Conference USA women's basketball tournament
