= 2019–20 Middle Tennessee Blue Raiders men's basketball team =

American college basketball season

2019–20 Middle Tennessee Blue Raiders men's basketball
- Conference: Conference USA
- Record: 8–23 (4–14 C-USA)
- Head coach: Nick McDevitt (2nd season)
- Assistant coaches: Sean Dixon; Wes Long; Andre Morgan
- Home arena: Murphy Center

2019–20 Conference USA men's basketball standings
	Conf.				Overall
Team	W		L	PCT	W		L	PCT
North Texas	14	–	4	.778	20	–	11	.645
Western Kentucky	13	–	5	.722	20	–	10	.667
Louisiana Tech	13	–	5	.722	22	–	8	.733
Charlotte	10	–	8	.556	16	–	13	.552
FIU	9	–	9	.500	19	–	13	.594
Marshall	10	–	8	.556	17	–	15	.531
UAB	9	–	9	.500	19	–	13	.594
Old Dominion	9	–	9	.500	13	–	19	.406
Florida Atlantic	8	–	10	.444	17	–	15	.531
UTSA	7	–	11	.389	13	–	19	.406
UTEP	8	–	10	.444	17	–	15	.531
Rice	7	–	11	.389	15	–	17	.469
Southern Miss	5	–	13	.278	9	–	22	.290
Middle Tennessee	4	–	14	.222	8	–	23	.258
Note: The 2020 C-USA tournament was canceled prior to the quarterfinals due to the COVID-19 pandemic.

The 2019–20 Middle Tennessee Blue Raiders men's basketball team represented Middle Tennessee State University during the 2019–20 NCAA Division I men's basketball season. The Blue Raiders, led by second-year head coach Nick McDevitt, played their home games at the Murphy Center in Murfreesboro, Tennessee as members of Conference USA (C-USA). They finished the season 8–23, 4–14 in C-USA play, to finish in 14th (last) place. They failed to qualify for the C-USA tournament.

== Previous season ==
The Blue Raiders finished the 2018–19 season 11–21 overall, 8–10 in C-USA play, to finish in a tie for ninth place. In the C-USA tournament, they were defeated in the first round by UAB.

== Roster ==
2019–20 Middle Tennessee Blue Raiders men's basketball team
Players
Coaches

Pos.	#	Name	Height	Weight	Year	Hometown
G	0	Anthony Crump	6 ft 8 in (2.03 m)	200 lb (91 kg)	RS Fr	Inkster, MI
F	1	Tyler Millin	6 ft 7 in (2.01 m)	195 lb (88 kg)	Fr	Calera, AL
F	2	DeAndre Dishman	6 ft 6 in (1.98 m)	220 lb (100 kg)	RS Jr	Lexington, KY
G	3	Donovan Sims	6 ft 1 in (1.85 m)	165 lb (75 kg)	Jr	Murfreesboro, TN
F	4	Tyson Jackson	6 ft 9 in (2.06 m)	245 lb (111 kg)	Fr	Fairburn, GA
G	5	Eli Lawrence	6 ft 5 in (1.96 m)	185 lb (84 kg)	Fr	Atlanta, GA
G	10	Sean Kromah	6 ft 4 in (1.93 m)	180 lb (82 kg)	RS Jr	Smyrna, TN
G	11	Jordan Davis	6 ft 3 in (1.91 m)	200 lb (91 kg)	Jr	Irmo, SC
G	13	Jayce Johnson	6 ft 5 in (1.96 m)	205 lb (93 kg)	So	Buffalo, NY
G	14	Jalen Jordan	6 ft 3 in (1.91 m)	160 lb (73 kg)	Jr	Conyers, GA
G	20	Brian II Coffey	6 ft 0 in (1.83 m)	185 lb (84 kg)	Jr	Snellville, GA
F	21	Jo'Vontae Millner	6 ft 6 in (1.98 m)	215 lb (98 kg)	RS Jr	Burlington, NC
F	22	Reggie Scurry	6 ft 6 in (1.98 m)	240 lb (109 kg)	Sr	Augusta, GA
G	23	C.J. Jones	6 ft 5 in (1.96 m)	170 lb (77 kg)	RS Jr	Birmingham, AL
F	24	Marcus Mitchell	6 ft 7 in (2.01 m)	235 lb (107 kg)	Jr	Memphis, TN
G	55	Antonio Green	6 ft 2 in (1.88 m)	190 lb (86 kg)	RS Sr	Tupelo, MS

Head coach

- Nick McDevitt (UNC Asheville)

Assistant coach(es)

- Sean Dixon (Presbyterian)
- Wes Long (Clemson)
- Andre Morgan (North Georgia)

Legend

- (C) Team captain
- (S) Suspended
- (I) Ineligible
- (W) Walk-on
- Injured
- Current redshirt

Roster
Last update: August 12, 2025

== Schedule and results ==
Date time, TV	Opponent	Result	Record	High points	High rebounds	High assists	Site (attendance) city, state
Non-conference regular season
November 5, 2019*; 11:00 a.m.	Maryville College	W 119–61	1–0	30 – Green	13 – Milner	5 – Crump	Murphy Center (8,055); Murfreesboro, TN
November 9, 2019*; 3:00 p.m.	at Lipscomb	W 73–70	2–0	23 – Jones	6 – tied	7 – Green	Allen Arena (2,834); Nashville, TN
November 13, 2019*; 6:30 p.m.	Mars Hill	W 96–82	3–0	31 – Green	10 – Lawrence	6 – Johnson	Murphy Center (3,125); Murfreesboro, TN
November 18, 2019*; 7:00 p.m.	at Coastal Carolina; Myrtle Beach Invitational non-bracket game	L 72–93	3–1	21 – Jones	8 – Lawrence	8 – Sims	HTC Center (1,187); Conway, SC
November 21, 2019*; 10:30 a.m., ESPN2	vs. No. 17 Villanova; Myrtle Beach Invitational quarterfinals	L 69–98	3–2	18 – Sims	6 – Lawrence	4 – Green	HTC Center; Conway, SC
November 22, 2019*; 11:00 a.m., ESPNU	vs. Tulane; Myrtle Beach Invitational consolation 2nd round	L 74–86	3–3	20 – Jones	7 – Green	9 – Sims	HTC Center; Conway, SC
November 24, 2019*; 7:30 p.m.	vs. Ohio; Myrtle Beach Invitational 7th-place game	L 63–75	3–4	13 – tied	8 – Johnson	4 – Johnson	HTC Center (1,977); Conway, SC
November 30, 2019*; 8:30 p.m.	Belmont	L 59–71	3–5	15 – Johnson	8 – Jackson	3 – Johnson	Murphy Center (3,806); Murfreesboro, TN
December 3, 2019*; 6:30 p.m.	Columbia International	W 86–38	4–5	22 – Green	9 – Crump	4 – tied	Murphy Center (2,913); Murfreesboro, TN
December 7, 2019*; 7:00 p.m., ESPN+	at Murray State	L 52–85	4–6	15 – Jones	6 – tied	4 – Green	CFSB Center (4,807); Murray, KY
December 14, 2019*; 2:00 p.m., SECN	at Ole Miss	L 64–82	4–7	23 – Jones	8 – Jackson	7 – Sims	The Pavilion at Ole Miss (7,734); Oxford, MS
December 21, 2019*; 2:00 p.m.	St. Bonaventure	L 65–66	4–8	26 – Jones	7 – Scurry	6 – Johnson	Murphy Center (2,982); Murfreesboro, TN
December 29, 2019*; 3:30 p.m.	Rhode Island	L 62–89	4–9	22 – Sims	8 – Millin	3 – Sims	Murphy Center (2,806); Murfreesboro, TN
C-USA regular season
January 2, 2020; 6:00 p.m., ESPN+	at Old Dominion	L 60–70	4–10 (0–1)	19 – Lawrence	7 – Jackson	7 – Sims	Chartway Arena (5,541); Norfolk, VA
January 4, 2020; 3:00 p.m., ESPN+	at Charlotte	L 62–68	4–11 (0–2)	20 – Sims	6 – tied	5 – Sims	Dale F. Halton Arena (3,538); Charlotte, NC
January 9, 2020; 6:30 p.m., ESPN+	Marshall	L 75–79	4–12 (0–3)	21 – Jones	13 – Scurry	5 – Green	Murphy Center (2,703); Murfreesboro, TN
January 11, 2020; 5:00 p.m., CBSSN	Western Kentucky	L 53–69	4–13 (0–4)	15 – Scurry	9 – Johnson	2 – Sims	Murphy Center (3,167); Murfreesboro, TN
January 16, 2020; 6:00 p.m., ESPN+	at Florida Atlantic	L 94–97 ^{OT}	4–14 (0–5)	24 – Sims	10 – Millner	2 – tied	RoofClaim.com Arena (2,002); Boca Raton, FL
January 18, 2020; 6:00 p.m., ESPN+	at FIU	L 69–83	4–15 (0–6)	24 – Jones	5 – tied	3 – tied	Ocean Bank Convocation Center (2,179); Miami, FL
January 23, 2020; 6:30 p.m., ESPN+	Louisiana Tech	L 73–80	4–16 (0–7)	16 – tied	6 – Scurry	3 – Green	Murphy Center (3,047); Murfreesboro, TN
January 25, 2020; 5:00 p.m., ESPN+	Southern Miss	W 65–63	5–16 (1–7)	17 – Jones	8 – Johnson	2 – tied	Murphy Center (3,523); Murfreesboro, TN
January 30, 2020; 8:00 p.m., ESPN+	at UTEP	L 66–67	5–17 (1–8)	19 – Millner	8 – tied	5 – Sims	Don Haskins Center (4,471); El Paso, TX
February 1, 2020; 3:00 p.m., ESPN+	at UTSA	W 83–80	6–17 (2–8)	27 – tied	8 – Jackson	4 – Green	Convocation Center (1,389); San Antonio, TX
February 6, 2020; 6:30 p.m., ESPN+	North Texas	L 70–75	6–18 (2–9)	18 – Green	9 – Johnson	3 – Johnson	Murphy Center (3,209); Murfreesboro, TN
February 8, 2020; 5:00 p.m.	Rice	L 83–91	6–19 (2–10)	24 – Jones	12 – Millner	4 – Sims	Murphy Center (3,912); Murfreesboro, TN
February 12, 2020; 7:00 p.m., ESPN+	at UAB	L 72–83	6–20 (2–11)	26 – Green	7 – Scurry	3 – Sims	Bartow Arena (2,461); Birmingham, AL
February 15, 2020; 2:00 p.m., ESPN+	UAB	L 66–79	6–21 (2–12)	14 – tied	5 – tied	4 – Johnson	Murphy Center (3,964); Murfreesboro, TN
February 22, 2020; 12:00 p.m., ESPN3	at Southern Miss	W 61–53	7–21 (3–12)	18 – Jones	8 – Johnson	4 – Johnson	Reed Green Coliseum (3,203); Hattiesburg, MS
March 1, 2020; 2:00 p.m., CUSA.tv	at Rice	L 66–77	7–22 (3–13)	13 – Scurry	6 – Jackson	5 – Jones	Tudor Fieldhouse (1,677); Houston, TX
March 4, 2020; 6:30 p.m., ESPN3	UTEP	L 56–60	7–23 (3–14)	22 – Jones	8 – Johnson	4 – Johnson	Murphy Center (2,022); Murfreesboro, TN
March 7, 2020; 5:00 p.m., ESPN3	Southern Miss	W 65–62 ^{OT}	8–23 (4–14)	16 – Green	8 – Johnson	3 – tied	Murphy Center (2,555); Murfreesboro, TN
*Non-conference game. ^{#}Rankings from AP poll. (#) Tournament seedings in parentheses. All times are in Central.
