= 2019–20 Old Dominion Monarchs men's basketball team =

American college basketball season

2019–20 Old Dominion Monarchs men's basketball
- Conference: Conference USA
- Record: 13–19 (9–9 C-USA)
- Head coach: Jeff Jones (7th season)
- Assistant coaches: Chris Kovensky; John Richardson; Bryant Stith
- Home arena: Chartway Arena (Note: Ted Constant Convocation Center's interior was renamed Chartway Arena on June 20, 2019.)

2019–20 Conference USA men's basketball standings
	Conf.				Overall
Team	W		L	PCT	W		L	PCT
North Texas	14	–	4	.778	20	–	11	.645
Western Kentucky	13	–	5	.722	20	–	10	.667
Louisiana Tech	13	–	5	.722	22	–	8	.733
Charlotte	10	–	8	.556	16	–	13	.552
FIU	9	–	9	.500	19	–	13	.594
Marshall	10	–	8	.556	17	–	15	.531
UAB	9	–	9	.500	19	–	13	.594
Old Dominion	9	–	9	.500	13	–	19	.406
Florida Atlantic	8	–	10	.444	17	–	15	.531
UTSA	7	–	11	.389	13	–	19	.406
UTEP	8	–	10	.444	17	–	15	.531
Rice	7	–	11	.389	15	–	17	.469
Southern Miss	5	–	13	.278	9	–	22	.290
Middle Tennessee	4	–	14	.222	8	–	23	.258
Note: The 2020 C-USA tournament was canceled prior to the quarterfinals due to the COVID-19 pandemic.

The 2019–20 Old Dominion Monarchs men’s basketball team represented Old Dominion University in the 2019–20 NCAA Division I men's basketball season. The Monarchs, led by 7th-year head coach Jeff Jones, played their home games at Chartway Arena in Norfolk, Virginia as members of Conference USA.

== Previous season ==
The Monarchs finished the 2018–19 season 26–9 overall, 13–5 in C-USA play to win the regular season championship. In the C-USA tournament, they defeated Louisiana Tech in the quarterfinals, UAB in the semifinals, to advance to the championship game, where they faced off against Western Kentucky, winning the game, earning the C-USA's automatic bid into the NCAA tournament. In the NCAA Tournament, they received the No. 14 seed in the South Region, where they were matched up against No. 3 seed Purdue, losing the game by a final score of 48–61.

== Roster ==
2019–20 Old Dominion Monarchs men's basketball team
Players
Coaches

Pos.	#	Name	Height	Weight	Year	Previous school	Hometown
G	1	Jason Wade	6 ft 5 in (1.96 m)	205 lb (93 kg)	So	Trinity Episcopal School	Richmond, Virginia
G	3	Malik Curry	6 ft 1 in (1.85 m)	180 lb (82 kg)	Jr	Putnam Science Academy; Palm Beach State	Wilmington, Delaware
F	4	Dimitris Karaiskos	6 ft 9 in (2.06 m)	220 lb (100 kg)	Fr	Panou Schools	Athens, Greece
G	10	Xavier Green	6 ft 6 in (1.98 m)	200 lb (91 kg)	RS Jr	Williamsburg Christian Academy	Williamsburg, Virginia
G	11	A.J. Oliver II	6 ft 5 in (1.96 m)	190 lb (86 kg)	RS So	Daniel High School; Clemson	Birmingham, Alabama
G	12	Jaylin Hunter	5 ft 11 in (1.8 m)	185 lb (84 kg)	Fr	East Catholic High School	Manchester, Connecticut
F	13	Aaron Carver	6 ft 7 in (2.01 m)	225 lb (102 kg)	RS Sr	South Kent School; Northeastern	Elizabeth City, North Carolina
F	15	Joe Reece	6 ft 8 in (2.03 m)	200 lb (91 kg)	So	East St. Louis High School	St. Louis, Missouri
G	20	Loren Brill (W)	6 ft 0 in (1.83 m)	190 lb (86 kg)	RS Jr	South Kent School; Georgetown Prep	Gaithersburg, Maryland
F	21	Alfis Pilavios	6 ft 5 in (1.96 m)	200 lb (91 kg)	RS So	Moraitis School	Athens, Greece
F	22	Kalu Ezikpe	6 ft 8 in (2.03 m)	235 lb (107 kg)	So	Discovery High School	Lawrenceville, Georgia
G	24	Quishon Harris (W)	5 ft 10 in (1.78 m)	140 lb (64 kg)	So	Hampton High School	Hampton, Virginia
F	35	Drew Lakey	6 ft 4 in (1.93 m)	225 lb (102 kg)	RS Sr	Edison High School; Virginia	Alexandria, Virginia

Head coach

- Jeff Jones (Virginia '82)

Assistant coach(es)

- Chris Kovensky (Old Dominion '11)
- John Richardson (Elizabeth City State '95)
- Bryant Stith (Virginia '92)

Legend

- (C) Team captain
- (S) Suspended
- (I) Ineligible
- (W) Walk-on
- Injured
- Current redshirt

Roster
Last update: January 17, 2020

== Schedule and results ==
Date time, TV	Rank^{#}	Opponent^{#}	Result	Record	Site (attendance) city, state
Non-conference regular season
November 5, 2019*; 8:00 pm		at Northern Iowa	L 53–58	0–1	McLeod Center (3,705); Cedar Falls, IA
November 10, 2019*; 2:00 pm, CUSA.tv		Saint Joseph's	W 82–69	1–1	Chartway Arena (6,086); Norfolk, VA
November 13, 2019*; 7:00 pm, CUSA.tv		Loyola (MD)	W 62–53	2–1	Chartway Arena (5,863); Norfolk, VA
November 16, 2019*; 1:00 pm, FloHoops		at Northeastern	W 76–69	3–1	Matthews Arena (2,209); Boston, MA
November 20, 2019*; 7:00 pm, WGNT/ESPN3		James Madison; Rivalry	L 78–80	3–2	Chartway Arena (7,001); Norfolk, VA
November 25, 2019*; 5:00 pm, FloHoops		vs. George Mason; Cayman Islands Classic Quarterfinals	L 53–60	3–3	John Gray Gymnasium (714); George Town, Cayman Islands
November 26, 2019*; 5:00 pm, FloHoops		vs. Washington State; Cayman Islands Classic Consolation 2nd Round	L 50–66	3–4	John Gray Gymnasium (406); George Town, Cayman Islands
November 27, 2019*; 11:00 am, FloHoops		vs. Loyola–Chicago; Cayman Islands Classic 7th Place Game	L 61–68	3–5	John Gray Gymnasium (1,235); George Town, Cayman Islands
December 3, 2019*; 7:00 pm, FloHoops/Cox Yurview VA		at William & Mary; Rivalry	L 46–63	3–6	Kaplan Arena (3,371); Williamsburg, VA
December 7, 2019*; 8:00 pm, MASN/WGNT/WTVR/ESPN+		at VCU; Rivalry	L 57–69	3–7	Siegel Center (7,637); Richmond, VA
December 14, 2019*; 6:00 pm, BTN		at Illinois	L 55–69	3–8	State Farm Center (13,267); Champaign, IL
December 18, 2019*; 7:00 pm, WGNT/ESPN3/WTVR		Richmond	L 59–62	3–9	Chartway Arena (6,219); Norfolk, VA
December 22, 2019*; 2:00 pm, CUSA.tv		Maryland Eastern Shore	W 76–52	4–9	Chartway Arena (5,376); Norfolk, VA
Conference USA regular season
January 2, 2020; 7:00 pm, ESPN+		Middle Tennessee	W 70–60	5–9 (1–0)	Chartway Arena (5,541); Norfolk, VA
January 4, 2020; 7:00 pm, ESPN+		UAB	W 58–52	6–9 (2–0)	Chartway Arena (6,494); Norfolk, VA
January 11, 2020; 4:00 pm, ESPN+		at Charlotte	L 47–53	6–10 (2–1)	Dale F. Halton Arena (4,524); Charlotte, NC
January 16, 2020; 8:00 pm, CBSSN		at Western Kentucky	L 69–71	6–11 (2–2)	E. A. Diddle Arena (3,816); Bowling Green, KY
January 18, 2020; 7:00 pm, ESPN+		at Marshall	L 67–68	6–12 (2–3)	Cam Henderson Center (6,445); Huntington, WV
January 20, 2020; 4:00 pm, ESPN+		Charlotte	W 66–62	7–12 (3–3)	Chartway Arena (5,490); Norfolk, VA
January 23, 2020; 7:00 pm, ESPNU		FIU	L 80–83	7–13 (3–4)	Chartway Arena (5,443); Norfolk, VA
January 25, 2020; 7:00 pm, ESPN+		Florida Atlantic	W 65–55	8–13 (4–4)	Chartway Arena (7,618); Norfolk, VA
January 30, 2020; 8:00 pm, ESPN+		at Southern Miss	W 68–58	9–13 (5–4)	Reed Green Coliseum (2,889); Hattiesburg, MS
February 1, 2020; 5:00 pm, ESPN+		at Louisiana Tech	L 73–76	9–14 (5–5)	Thomas Assembly Center (3,763); Ruston, LA
February 6, 2020; 7:00 pm, ESPN+		UTSA	L 81–85 ^{OT}	9–15 (5–6)	Chartway Arena (5,264); Norfolk, VA
February 8, 2020; 7:00 pm, ESPN+		UTEP	W 72–53	10–15 (6–6)	Chartway Arena (6,820); Norfolk, VA
February 13, 2020; 8:00 pm, ESPN+		at Rice	W 73–70	11–15 (7–6)	Tudor Fieldhouse (1,387); Houston, TX
February 15, 2020; 2:00 pm, ESPN+		at North Texas	L 47–64	11–16 (7–7)	The Super Pit (5,282); Denton, TX
February 22, 2020; 7:00 pm, ESPN3		at Marshall	L 66–74	11–17 (7–8)	Cam Henderson Center (5,916); Huntington, WV
March 1, 2020; 2:00 pm, ESPN3		Florida Atlantic	W 85–80 ^{OT}	12–17 (8–8)	Chartway Arena (5,031); Norfolk, VA
March 4, 2020; 7:00 pm, ESPN3		UTSA	W 84–59	13–17 (9–8)	Chartway Arena (4,969); Norfolk, VA
March 7, 2020; 8:00 pm, CUSA.tv		at UAB	L 63–72	13–18 (9–9)	Bartow Arena; Birmingham, AL
Conference USA tournament
March 11, 2020; 7:00 pm, ESPN+	(8)	vs. (9) Florida Atlantic; First round	L 56–66	13–19	Ford Center at The Star; Frisco, TX
*Non-conference game. ^{#}Rankings from AP Poll. (#) Tournament seedings in parentheses. All times are in Eastern.
