= 2019–20 Southern Miss Golden Eagles basketball team =

American college basketball season

2019–20 Southern Miss Golden Eagles basketball
- Conference: Conference USA
- Record: 9–22 (5–13 C-USA)
- Head coach: Jay Ladner (1st season)
- Assistant coaches: Kyle Roane; Dalonte Hill; Clarence Weatherspoon
- Home arena: Reed Green Coliseum

2019–20 Conference USA men's basketball standings
| | Conf. | | | | Overall |
| Team | W | | L | PCT | W | | L | PCT |
|---|---|---|---|---|---|---|---|---|
| North Texas | 14 | – | 4 | .778 | 20 | – | 11 | .645 |
| Western Kentucky | 13 | – | 5 | .722 | 20 | – | 10 | .667 |
| Louisiana Tech | 13 | – | 5 | .722 | 22 | – | 8 | .733 |
| Charlotte | 10 | – | 8 | .556 | 16 | – | 13 | .552 |
| FIU | 9 | – | 9 | .500 | 19 | – | 13 | .594 |
| Marshall | 10 | – | 8 | .556 | 17 | – | 15 | .531 |
| UAB | 9 | – | 9 | .500 | 19 | – | 13 | .594 |
| Old Dominion | 9 | – | 9 | .500 | 13 | – | 19 | .406 |
| Florida Atlantic | 8 | – | 10 | .444 | 17 | – | 15 | .531 |
| UTSA | 7 | – | 11 | .389 | 13 | – | 19 | .406 |
| UTEP | 8 | – | 10 | .444 | 17 | – | 15 | .531 |
| Rice | 7 | – | 11 | .389 | 15 | – | 17 | .469 |
| Southern Miss | 5 | – | 13 | .278 | 9 | – | 22 | .290 |
| Middle Tennessee | 4 | – | 14 | .222 | 8 | – | 23 | .258 |
Note: The 2020 C-USA tournament was canceled prior to the quarterfinals due to the COVID-19 pandemic.

The 2019–20 Southern Miss Golden Eagles men's basketball team represented the University of Southern Mississippi during the 2019–20 NCAA Division I men's basketball season. The Golden Eagles, led by first-year head coach Jay Ladner, played their home games at Reed Green Coliseum in Hattiesburg, Mississippi as members of Conference USA.

== Previous season ==
The Golden Eagles finished the 2018–19 season 20–13, 11–7 in C-USA play to finish in a tie for third place. They defeated Marshall in the quarterfinals before losing to Western Kentucky in the semifinals of the C-USA tournament. They were invited to the College Basketball Invitational where they lost to Longwood in the first round.

Doc Sadler resigned on April 11 after 5 seasons at Southern Miss. Under Sadler, the Golden Eagles went 56–94 overall, but this season was their best under Sadler, in which the team went 20–13 overall and finished tied for 2nd in conference play. The following day, new Nebraska head coach Fred Hoiberg announced he had hired Sadler, a former Cornhuskers head coach who had spent a season on Hoiberg's staff at Iowa State, as an assistant. The school hired Southeastern Louisiana head coach and fellow alumnus Jay Ladner as their new head coach on April 17.

== Departures ==
| Name | Number | Pos. | Height | Weight | Year | Hometown | Reason for departure |
|---|---|---|---|---|---|---|---|
| Dominic Magee | 0 | G | 6'4" | 190 | RS Senior | Harvey, LA | Graduated |
| Cortez Edwards | 1 | G | 6'2" | 180 | Senior | Kissimmee, FL | Graduated |
| Shakur Daniel | 2 | G | 6'5" | 175 | Freshman | Toronto, ON | Transferred to Ranger College |
| Christian Clark | 4 | G | 6'0" | 175 | RS Junior | Hattiesburg, MS | Walk-on; left the team for personal reasons |
| Tim Rowe | 12 | F | 6'11" | 220 | Senior | Lilburn, GA | Graduated |
| Kevin Holland | 20 | G | 6'1" | 187 | RS Senior | Tuscaloosa, AL | Graduated |
| Anfernee Hampton | 21 | G | 6'5" | 170 | RS Senior | Jackson, MS | Walk-on; graduated |
| LaDarius Marshall | 23 | F | 6'5" | 205 | Freshman | Jackson, MS | Transferred to Hinds CC |
| Tyree Griffin | 55 | G | 5'10" | 175 | RS Senior | New Orleans, LA | Graduated |

=== Incoming transfers ===
| Name | Number | Pos. | Height | Weight | Year | Hometown | Previous School |
|---|---|---|---|---|---|---|---|
| Denijay Harris | 1 | G/F | 6'7" | 195 | Freshman | Columbus, MS | Junior college transferred from Southwest Mississippi CC |
| David McCoy | 4 | G | 6'0" | | Sophomore | Meridian, MS | Junior college transferred from Jones County JC. Will join the team as a walk-on. |
| Jay Malone | 10 | G | 6'1" | 175 | RS Sophomore | Meridian, MS | Junior college transferred from Southwest Mississippi CC |
| Bill Muse | 22 | G | 6'2" | 185 | RS Senior | Muskogee, OK | Transferred from Coastal Carolina. Will be eligible to play immediately since Muse graduated from Coastal Carolina. Will join the team as a walk-on. |
| Jarrod Rigby | 25 | G | 6'0" | 160 | RS Senior | Bay St. Louis, MS | Transferred from Southeastern Louisiana. Will be eligible to play immediately since Rigby graduated from Southeastern Louisiana. Will join the team as a walk-on. |
| Isaiah Jones | 44 | F | 6'8" | | RS Junior | Phoenix, AZ | Junior college transferred from Connors State College |

== Recruiting class of 2019 ==
College recruiting information
| Name | Hometown | School | Height | Weight | Commit date |
|---|---|---|---|---|---|
| Angel Smith; SG | Fort Lauderdale, FL | Northeast High School | 6 ft 5 in (1.96 m) | 180 lb (82 kg) | Jul 19, 2019 |
| Angel Smith; SG | Recruit ratings: Scout: Rivals: 247Sports: (NR) | | | | |
| Jeffery Armstrong; PG | Rainsville, AL | Massanutten Military Academy | 6 ft 2 in (1.88 m) | 125 lb (57 kg) | Jun 12, 2019 |
| Jeffery Armstrong; PG | Recruit ratings: Scout: Rivals: 247Sports: (NR) | | | | |
| Auston Leslie; SG | Huntsville, AL | Westminster Christian Academy | 6 ft 4 in (1.93 m) | 165 lb (75 kg) | Jun 12, 2019 |
| Auston Leslie; SG | Recruit ratings: Scout: Rivals: 247Sports: (NR) | | | | |
| Hunter Dean; C | Mandeville, LA | Lakeshore High School | 6 ft 9 in (2.06 m) | 210 lb (95 kg) | Apr 29, 2019 |
| Hunter Dean; C | Recruit ratings: Scout: Rivals: 247Sports: (NR) | | | | |
| Artur Konontsuk; PF | Pärnu, Estonia | Get Better Academy | 6 ft 6 in (1.98 m) | 215 lb (98 kg) | Aug 8, 2019 |
| Artur Konontsuk; PF | Recruit ratings: Scout: Rivals: 247Sports: (NR) | | | | |
Overall recruit ranking:
Note: In many cases, Scout, Rivals, 247Sports, On3, and ESPN may conflict in their listings of height and weight.; In these cases, the average was taken. ESPN grades are on a 100-point scale.; Sources: "2019 Team Ranking". Rivals.

== Roster ==
2019–20 Southern Miss Golden Eagles men's basketball team
Players
Coaches

| Pos. | # | Name | Height | Weight | Year | Previous school | Hometown |
|---|---|---|---|---|---|---|---|
| G | 0 | Gabe Watson | 6 ft 2 in (1.88 m) | 192 lb (87 kg) | So | St. Joseph Catholic School | Jackson, Mississippi |
| F | 1 | Denijay Harris | 6 ft 7 in (2.01 m) | 203 lb (92 kg) | RS Fr | Southwest Mississippi Community College | Columbus, Mississippi |
| F | 2 | Jeffery Armstrong | 6 ft 0 in (1.83 m) | 175 lb (79 kg) | Fr | Massanutten Military Academy | Rainsville, Alabama |
| G | 3 | Angel Smith | 6 ft 5 in (1.96 m) | 185 lb (84 kg) | Fr | Northeast High School | Fort Lauderdale, Florida |
| G | 4 | David McCoy (W) | 6 ft 1 in (1.85 m) | 171 lb (78 kg) | Jr | Jones County Junior College | Meridian, Mississippi |
| F | 5 | Artur Konontsuk | 6 ft 7 in (2.01 m) | 215 lb (98 kg) | Fr | Get Better Academy | Pärnu, Estonia |
| G | 10 | Jay Malone | 6 ft 0 in (1.83 m) | 167 lb (76 kg) | RS So | Southwest Mississippi Community College | Meridian, Mississippi |
| G | 11 | LaDavius Draine | 6 ft 4 in (1.93 m) | 212 lb (96 kg) | Jr | Calhoun City High School | Calhoun City, Mississippi |
| F | 13 | Boban Jacdonmi | 6 ft 9 in (2.06 m) | 256 lb (116 kg) | RS Sr | Chattanooga State Community College | London, England |
| F | 14 | Tyler Stevenson (W) | 6 ft 8 in (2.03 m) | 207 lb (94 kg) | So | New Hope High School | Columbus, Mississippi |
| G | 15 | Clay Weatherspoon (W) | 6 ft 2 in (1.88 m) | 212 lb (96 kg) | RS Jr | Ridgeland High School (MS) | Jackson, Mississippi |
| F | 20 | Hunter Dean | 6 ft 10 in (2.08 m) | 232 lb (105 kg) | Fr | Lakeshore High School | Mandeville, Louisiana |
| G | 21 | Auston Leslie | 6 ft 4 in (1.93 m) | 166 lb (75 kg) | Fr | Westminster Christian Academy | Huntsville, Alabama |
| G | 22 | Bill Muse Jr. (W) | 6 ft 2 in (1.88 m) | 190 lb (86 kg) | RS Sr | Coastal Carolina | Muskogee, Oklahoma |
| G | 25 | Jerrod Rigby (W) | 6 ft 0 in (1.83 m) | 160 lb (73 kg) | RS Sr | Southeastern Louisiana | Bay St. Louis, Mississippi |
| F | 32 | Leonard Harper-Baker | 6 ft 5 in (1.96 m) | 208 lb (94 kg) | RS Sr | Moberly Area Community College | Detroit, Michigan |
| F | 44 | Isaiah Jones | 6 ft 7 in (2.01 m) | 234 lb (106 kg) | RS Sr | Connors State College | Phoenix, Arizona |

Head coach

- Jay Ladner (Southern Miss)

Assistant coach(es)

- Kyle Roane (Southern Miss)
- Dalonte Hill (UNC Charlotte)
- Clarence Weatherspoon (Southern Miss)

Legend

- (C) Team captain
- (S) Suspended
- (I) Ineligible
- (W) Walk-on
- Injured
- Current redshirt

Roster

== Schedule and results ==
| Date time, TV | Opponent | Result | Record | Site (attendance) city, state |
Exhibition
| October 29, 2019*; 7:00 pm | Mississippi College | W 73–68 | | Reed Green Coliseum; Hattiesburg, MS |
Non-conference regular season
| November 5, 2019*; 7:00 pm | Delta State | W 90–71 | 1–0 | Reed Green Coliseum (2,824); Hattiesburg, MS |
| November 9, 2019*; 7:00 pm, ESPN+ | at South Alabama | L 69–75 | 1–1 | Mitchell Center (1,893); Mobile, AL |
| November 14, 2019*; 6:00 pm, ESPN+ | at North Florida | L 63–66 | 1–2 | UNF Arena (2,058); Jacksonville, FL |
| November 19, 2019*; 7:00 pm | at Iowa State; Battle 4 Atlantis campus-site game | L 45–73 | 1–3 | Hilton Coliseum (13,810); Ames, IA |
| November 24, 2019*; 2:00 pm | William Carey | W 83–64 | 2–3 | Reed Green Coliseum (2,635); Hattiesburg, MS |
| November 27, 2019*; 6:00 pm, ESPNU | vs. No. 8 Gonzaga; Battle 4 Atlantis quarterfinals | L 69–94 | 2–4 | Imperial Arena (1,459); Nassau, Bahamas |
| November 28, 2019*; 8:00 pm, ESPN2 | vs. No. 13 Seton Hall; Battle 4 Atlantis consolation 2nd round | L 56–81 | 2–5 | Imperial Arena (1,204); Nassau, Bahamas |
| November 30, 2019*; 8:00 pm, ESPNU | vs. Alabama; Battle 4 Atlantis 7th place game | L 68–83 | 2–6 | Imperial Arena (1,159); Nassau, Bahamas |
| December 4, 2019*; 7:00 pm | Tulane | L 56–61 | 2–7 | Reed Green Coliseum (3,668); Hattiesburg, MS |
| December 7, 2019*; 2:00 pm | Southern Illinois | W 72–69 | 3–7 | Reed Green Coliseum (2,009); Hattiesburg, MS |
| December 14, 2019*; 2:00 pm | North Florida | L 69–72 | 3–8 | Reed Green Coliseum (2,380); Hattiesburg, MS |
| December 16, 2019*; 6:00 pm, ESPN2 | at No. 24 Texas Tech | L 65–71 | 3–9 | United Supermarkets Arena (12,290); Lubbock, TX |
| December 21, 2019*; 2:00 pm | Tougaloo | W 96–77 | 4–9 | Reed Green Coliseum (2,408); Hattiesburg, MS |
Conference USA regular season
| December 30, 2019; 7:00 pm, ESPN+ | Louisiana Tech | L 49–80 | 4–10 (0–1) | Reed Green Coliseum (3,005); Hattiesburg, MS |
| January 4, 2020; 4:00 pm, ESPN+ | at Louisiana Tech | L 50–78 | 4–11 (0–2) | Thomas Assembly Center (2,341); Ruston, LA |
| January 9, 2020; 8:00 pm, ESPN+ | at UTEP | L 64–76 | 4–12 (0–3) | Don Haskins Center (4,622); El Paso, TX |
| January 11, 2020; 3:00 pm, ESPN3 | at UTSA | L 70–80 | 4–13 (0–4) | Convocation Center (1,095); San Antonio, TX |
| January 16, 2020; 7:00 pm, ESPN+ | North Texas | L 52–72 | 4–14 (0–5) | Reed Green Coliseum; Hattiesburg, MS |
| January 18, 2020; 2:00 pm, ESPN+ | Rice | W 81–68 | 5–14 (1–5) | Reed Green Coliseum (3,571); Hattiesburg, MS |
| January 23, 2020; 7:00 pm, ESPN+ | at UAB | W 84–77 | 6–14 (2–5) | Bartow Arena (2,705); Birmingham, AL |
| January 25, 2020; 5:00 pm | at Middle Tennessee | L 63–65 | 6–15 (2–6) | Murphy Center (3,523); Murfreesboro, TN |
| January 30, 2020; 7:00 pm, ESPN+ | Old Dominion | L 58–68 | 6–16 (2–7) | Reed Green Coliseum (2,889); Hattiesburg, MS |
| February 1, 2020; 2:00 pm, ESPN+ | Charlotte | W 74–68 ^{OT} | 7–16 (3–7) | Reed Green Coliseum (3,840); Hattiesburg, MS |
| February 6, 2020; 6:00 pm, ESPN+ | at Marshall | L 58–72 | 7–17 (3–8) | Cam Henderson Center (5,528); Huntington, WV |
| February 8, 2020; 6:30 pm, Stadium | at Western Kentucky | L 72–75 | 7–18 (3–9) | E. A. Diddle Arena (6,170); Bowling Green, KY |
| February 13, 2020; 7:00 pm, ESPN+ | Florida Atlantic | W 68–66 | 8–18 (4–9) | Reed Green Coliseum; Hattiesburg, MS |
| February 15, 2020; 2:00 pm, ESPN+ | FIU | W 75–67 | 9–18 (5–9) | Reed Green Coliseum (4,059); Hattiesburg, MS |
| February 22, 2020; 12:00 pm, ESPN3 | Middle Tennessee | L 53–61 | 9–19 (5–10) | Reed Green Coliseum (3,203); Hattiesburg, MS |
| March 1, 2020; 3:00 pm, CUSA.tv | at UTEP | L 56–75 | 9–20 (5–11) | Don Haskins Center (4,975); El Paso, TX |
| March 4, 2020; 7:00 pm, ESPN3 | Rice | L 57–72 | 9–21 (5–12) | Reed Green Coliseum (3,065); Hattiesburg, MS |
| March 7, 2020; 5:00 pm, ESPN3 | at Middle Tennessee | L 62-65 ^{OT} | 9-22 (5-13) | Murphy Center; Murfreesboro, TN |
*Non-conference game. ^{#}Rankings from AP Poll. (#) Tournament seedings in parentheses. All times are in Central Time Source.
