= 2019–20 UTSA Roadrunners men's basketball team =

American college basketball season

2019–20 UTSA Roadrunners men's basketball
- Conference: Conference USA
- Record: 13–19 (7–11 C-USA)
- Head coach: Steve Henson (4th season)
- Associate head coach: Mike Peck
- Assistant coaches: Scott Thompson; Adam Hood
- Home arena: Convocation Center

2019–20 Conference USA men's basketball standings
	Conf.				Overall
Team	W		L	PCT	W		L	PCT
North Texas	14	–	4	.778	20	–	11	.645
Western Kentucky	13	–	5	.722	20	–	10	.667
Louisiana Tech	13	–	5	.722	22	–	8	.733
Charlotte	10	–	8	.556	16	–	13	.552
FIU	9	–	9	.500	19	–	13	.594
Marshall	10	–	8	.556	17	–	15	.531
UAB	9	–	9	.500	19	–	13	.594
Old Dominion	9	–	9	.500	13	–	19	.406
Florida Atlantic	8	–	10	.444	17	–	15	.531
UTSA	7	–	11	.389	13	–	19	.406
UTEP	8	–	10	.444	17	–	15	.531
Rice	7	–	11	.389	15	–	17	.469
Southern Miss	5	–	13	.278	9	–	22	.290
Middle Tennessee	4	–	14	.222	8	–	23	.258
Note: The 2020 C-USA tournament was canceled prior to the quarterfinals due to the COVID-19 pandemic.

The 2019–20 UTSA Roadrunners men's basketball team represent the University of Texas at San Antonio in the 2019–20 NCAA Division I men's basketball season. The Roadrunners, led by 4th-year head coach Steve Henson, play their home games at the Convocation Center in San Antonio, Texas as members of Conference USA.

== Previous season ==
The Roadrunners finished the 2018–19 season 17–15 overall, 11–7 in C-USA play to finish in three-way tie for 2nd place. In the C-USA tournament, they were defeated by UAB in the quarterfinals.

== Roster ==
2019–20 UTSA Roadrunners men's basketball team
Players
Coaches

Pos.	#	Name	Height	Weight	Year	Previous school	Hometown
G	2	Jhivvan Jackson	6 ft 0 in (1.83 m)	170 lb (77 kg)	Jr	Trinity HS	Bayamón, Puerto Rico
F	3	Byron Frohnen	6 ft 6 in (1.98 m)	230 lb (104 kg)	Sr	Bishop Gorman HS	Las Vegas, Nevada
G	5	Makani Whiteside	6 ft 4 in (1.93 m)	190 lb (86 kg)	Fr	Liberty HS (Madera)	Madera, California
G	10	Erik Czumbel	6 ft 3 in (1.91 m)	185 lb (84 kg)	Fr	Aquila Basket Trento	Verona, Italy
G	11	Adokiye Iyaye	6 ft 3 in (1.91 m)	180 lb (82 kg)	So	Putnam City North HS	Oklahoma City, Oklahoma
F	12	Phoenix Ford	6 ft 8 in (2.03 m)	230 lb (104 kg)	RS So	Richmond; Mississippi Gulf Coast	St. Petersburg, Florida
G/F	20	Eric Parrish	6 ft 6 in (1.98 m)	195 lb (88 kg)	Jr	Bossier Parish CC; Nevada	Cypress, Texas
G	21	Knox Hellums	6 ft 5 in (1.96 m)	205 lb (93 kg)	RS Jr	Concordia Lutheran HS; Pepperdine	Tomball, Texas
G	22	Keaton Wallace	6 ft 3 in (1.91 m)	185 lb (84 kg)	Jr	Richardson HS	Dallas, Texas
F	23	Atem Bior	6 ft 7 in (2.01 m)	225 lb (102 kg)	Sr	New Mexico Highlands; New Mexico Military Institute	Brisbane, Australia
C	24	Jacob Germany	6 ft 11 in (2.11 m)	220 lb (100 kg)	Fr	Kingston HS	Kingston, Oklahoma
F	25	Adrian Rodriguez	6 ft 7 in (2.01 m)	245 lb (111 kg)	RS So	Union HS	Tulsa, Oklahoma
F	32	Austin Timperman (W)	6 ft 9 in (2.06 m)	190 lb (86 kg)	RS Fr	The Woodlands HS	The Woodlands, Texas
F	44	Luka Barisic	6 ft 10 in (2.08 m)	240 lb (109 kg)	Jr	Highland CC (IL)	Osijek, Croatia

Head coach

- Steve Henson (Kansas State)

Assistant coach(es)

- Mike Peck (Northwood)
- Scott Thompson (Mississippi)
- Adam Hood (Air Force)

Legend

- (C) Team captain
- (S) Suspended
- (I) Ineligible
- (W) Walk-on
- Injured
- Current redshirt

Roster
Last update: January 18, 2020

== Schedule and results ==
Date time, TV	Rank^{#}	Opponent^{#}	Result	Record	Site (attendance) city, state
Exhibition
October 30, 2019*; 7:00 pm, CUSA.tv		Texas A&M International	W 89–60		Convocation Center (538); San Antonio, TX
Non-conference regular season
November 5, 2019*; 7:00 pm, SoonerSports.TV		at Oklahoma	L 67–85	0–1	Lloyd Noble Center (7,202); Norman, OK
November 8, 2019*; 6:30 pm, FloHoops		vs. Southern Illinois; Sunshine Slam	L 60–72	0–2	Silver Spurs Arena (556); Kissimmee, FL
November 9, 2019*; 4:30 pm, FloHoops		vs. Oakland; Sunshine Slam	L 62–75	0–3	Silver Spurs Arena (564); Kissimmee, FL
November 10, 2019*; 2:30 pm, FloHoops		vs. Delaware; Sunshine Slam	L 79–91	0–4	Silver Spurs Arena (539); Kissimmee, FL
November 18, 2019*; 8:00 pm, Stadium on Facebook		at No. 15 Utah State	L 50–82	0–5	Smith Spectrum (8,667); Logan, UT
November 22, 2019*; 7:00 pm, CUSA.tv		Wiley	W 90–68	1–5	Convocation Center (917); San Antonio, TX
November 30, 2019*; 7:00 pm, CUSA.tv		Prairie View A&M	L 72–79	1–6	Convocation Center (888); San Antonio, TX
December 3, 2019*; 7:00 pm, CUSA.tv		Texas A&M–Corpus Christi	W 89–67	2–6	Convocation Center (939); San Antonio, TX
December 7, 2019*; 4:00 pm, ESPN+		at Texas State; I-35 Rivalry	W 77–71	3–6	Strahan Arena (2,463); San Marcos, TX
December 15, 2019*; 3:00 pm, CUSA.tv		UT Permian Basin	W 98–55	4–6	Convocation Center (708); San Antonio, TX
December 18, 2019*; 4:30 pm, ESPN3		vs. Oregon State; Battleground 2K19	L 78–88	4–7	Toyota Center (712); Houston, TX
December 21, 2019*; 3:00 pm, CUSA.tv		Illinois State	W 89–70	5–7	Convocation Center (853); San Antonio, TX
December 28, 2019*; 3:00 pm, CUSA.tv		Our Lady of the Lake	W 99–64	6–7	Convocation Center (1,087); San Antonio, TX
Conference USA regular season
January 2, 2020; 6:00 pm, ESPN+		at Florida Atlantic	L 64–79	6–8 (0–1)	RoofClaim.com Arena (747); Boca Raton, FL
January 4, 2020; 6:00 pm, ESPN+		at FIU	L 83–90 ^{OT}	6–9 (0–2)	Ocean Bank Convocation Center (543); Miami, FL
January 9, 2020; 6:00 pm, ESPNU		Louisiana Tech	W 89–73	7–9 (1–2)	Convocation Center (4,524); San Antonio, TX
January 11, 2020; 3:00 pm, ESPN3		Southern Miss	W 80–70	8–9 (2–2)	Convocation Center (1,095); San Antonio, TX
January 15, 2020; 8:00 pm, ESPN+		at UTEP	L 77–80	8–10 (2–3)	Don Haskins Center (4,442); El Paso, TX
January 18, 2020; 3:00 pm, ESPN3		UTEP	W 86–70	9–10 (3–3)	Convocation Center (1,684); San Antonio, TX
January 23, 2020; 7:00 pm, Stadium on Facebook		at North Texas	L 78–98	9–11 (3–4)	The Super Pit (3,186); Denton, TX
January 25, 2020; 7:00 pm, ESPN+		Rice	W 90–88	10–11 (4–4)	Tudor Fieldhouse (2,339); Houston, TX
January 30, 2020; 7:00 pm, Stadium		UAB	L 68–76	10–12 (4–5)	Convocation Center (1,389); San Antonio, TX
February 1, 2020; 3:00 pm, ESPN+		Middle Tennessee	L 80–83	10–13 (4–6)	Convocation Center (1,389); San Antonio, TX
February 6, 2020; 6:00 pm, ESPN+		at Old Dominion	W 85–81 ^{OT}	11–13 (5–6)	Chartway Arena (5,264); Norfolk, VA
February 8, 2020; 3:00 pm, ESPN+		at Charlotte	L 84–91	11–14 (5–7)	Dale F. Halton Arena (4,679); Charlotte, NC
February 13, 2020; 8:00 pm, CBSSN		Marshall	W 72–63	12–14 (6–7)	Convocation Center (1,282); San Antonio, TX
February 15, 2020; 2:00 pm, CBSSN on Facebook		Western Kentucky	L 73–77 ^{OT}	12–15 (6–8)	Convocation Center (1,576); San Antonio, TX
February 27, 2020; 6:00 pm, CUSA.tv		at Florida Atlantic	L 71–80	12–16 (6–9)	RoofClaim.com Arena (1,164); Boca Raton, FL
March 1, 2020; 2:00 pm, CUSA.tv		UAB	W 66–59	13–16 (7–9)	Convocation Center (1,165); San Antonio, TX
March 4, 2020; 6:00 pm, ESPN3		at Old Dominion	L 59–84	13–17 (7–10)	Chartway Arena (4,969); Norfolk, VA
March 7, 2020; 3:00 pm, Stadium		Marshall	L 77-82	13-18 (7-11)	Convocation Center (402); San Antonio, TX
Conference USA tournament
March 11, 2020; 8:30 pm, ESPN+	(10)	vs. (7) UAB; First round	L 69–74	13–19	Ford Center at The Star; Frisco, TX
*Non-conference game. ^{#}Rankings from AP Poll. (#) Tournament seedings in parentheses. All times are in Central.
