= 2019–20 Charlotte 49ers men's basketball team =

American college basketball season

2019–20 Charlotte 49ers men's basketball
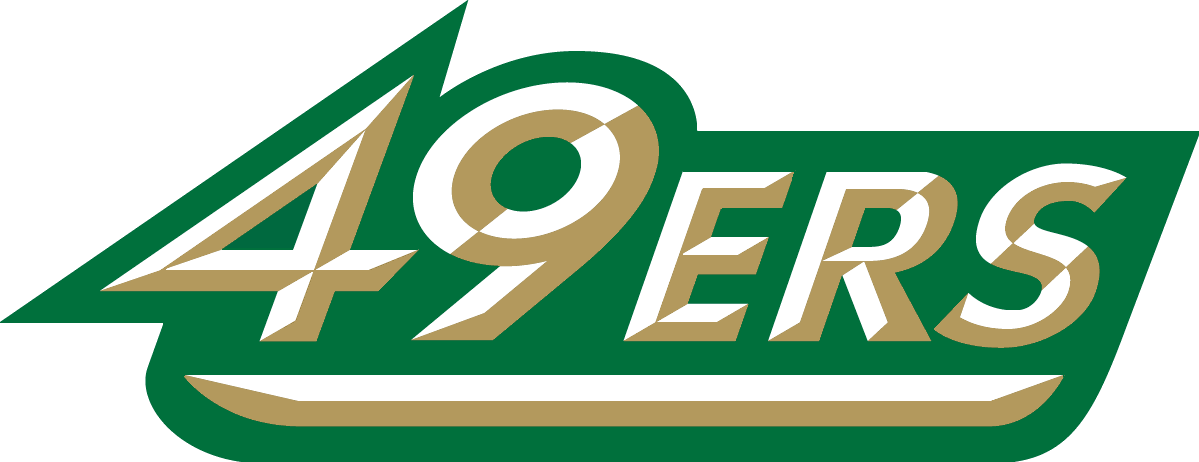
- Conference: Conference USA
- Record: 16–13 (10–8 C-USA)
- Head coach: Ron Sanchez (2nd season)
- Assistant coaches: Aaron Fearne; Kotie Kimble; Vic Sfera
- Home arena: Dale F. Halton Arena

2019–20 Conference USA men's basketball standings
	Conf.				Overall
Team	W		L	PCT	W		L	PCT
North Texas	14	–	4	.778	20	–	11	.645
Western Kentucky	13	–	5	.722	20	–	10	.667
Louisiana Tech	13	–	5	.722	22	–	8	.733
Charlotte	10	–	8	.556	16	–	13	.552
FIU	9	–	9	.500	19	–	13	.594
Marshall	10	–	8	.556	17	–	15	.531
UAB	9	–	9	.500	19	–	13	.594
Old Dominion	9	–	9	.500	13	–	19	.406
Florida Atlantic	8	–	10	.444	17	–	15	.531
UTSA	7	–	11	.389	13	–	19	.406
UTEP	8	–	10	.444	17	–	15	.531
Rice	7	–	11	.389	15	–	17	.469
Southern Miss	5	–	13	.278	9	–	22	.290
Middle Tennessee	4	–	14	.222	8	–	23	.258
Note: The 2020 C-USA tournament was canceled prior to the quarterfinals due to the COVID-19 pandemic.

The 2019–20 Charlotte 49ers men's basketball team represented the University of North Carolina at Charlotte in the 2019–20 NCAA Division I men's basketball season. The 49ers, led by second-year head coach Ron Sanchez, played their home games at the Dale F. Halton Arena in Charlotte, North Carolina as members of Conference USA (C-USA). They finished the season 16–13, 10–8 in C-USA play, to finish in fourth place. They were set to be the No. 4 seed in the C-USA tournament; however, it was canceled amid the COVID-19 pandemic.

== Previous season ==
The 49ers finished the 2018–19 season 8–21 overall, 5–13 in C-USA play, to finish in 13th place. Since only the top 12 teams are eligible, they failed to qualify for the C-USA tournament.

== Offseason ==
=== Departures ===
Name	Number	Pos.	Height	Weight	Year	Hometown	Reason for departure
Jalian Haslem	0	C	6' 10"	260	Senior	Warner Robins, GA	Graduated
Najee Garvin	1	F	6' 7"	220	Junior	Lexington, SC	Dismissed from the team due to a misdemeanor assault; transferred to Nicholls
Jaylen McGill	3	G	6' 2"	200	Sophomore	Charlotte, NC	Transferred to Carson–Newman
Jon Davis	3	G	6' 3"	200	Senior	Upper Marlboro, MD	Graduated
Dravon Mangum	20	F	6' 9"	200	Freshman	Roxboro, NC	Transferred to Radford
Bryant Thomas	30	F	6' 9"	210	Sophomore	Charlotte, NC	Dismissed from the team due to team exceptions; transferred to Carson–Newman

=== Incoming transfers ===
Name	Number	Pos.	Height	Weight	Year	Hometown	Previous
Amidou Bamba	15	F	6' 9"	255	Graduate student	Toronto, ON	Transferred from Coastal Carolina. Will be eligible to play immediately since Bamba graduated from Coastal Carolina.
Drew Edwards	25	G	6' 4"	185	Graduate student	Perry Hall, MD	Transferred from Providence. Will be eligible to play immediately since Edwards graduated from Providence.

=== 2019 recruiting class ===
College recruiting information
Name	Hometown	School	Height	Weight	Commit date
Jahmir Young; PG	Upper Marlboro, MD	DeMatha Catholic High School	6 ft 0 in (1.83 m)	160 lb (73 kg)	Oct 26, 2018
Jahmir Young; PG	Recruit ratings: Scout: Rivals: 247Sports: (NR)				
Anzac Rissetto; C	Auckland, New Zealand		6 ft 10 in (2.08 m)	N/A	Nov 16, 2018
Anzac Rissetto; C	Recruit ratings: Scout: Rivals: 247Sports: (NR)				
Caleb Stone-Carrawell; SF	Concord, NC	Cox Mill High School	6 ft 6 in (1.98 m)	195 lb (88 kg)	Oct 29, 2018
Caleb Stone-Carrawell; SF	Recruit ratings: Scout: Rivals: 247Sports: (NR)				
Brice Williams; SF	Huntersville, NC	Hopewell High School	6 ft 7 in (2.01 m)	190 lb (86 kg)	Nov 16, 2018
Brice Williams; SF	Recruit ratings: Scout: Rivals: 247Sports: (NR)				
Overall recruit ranking:
Note: In many cases, Scout, Rivals, 247Sports, On3, and ESPN may conflict in their listings of height and weight.; In these cases, the average was taken. ESPN grades are on a 100-point scale.; Sources: "2019 Team Ranking". Rivals.

=== 2020 recruiting class ===
College recruiting information (2020)
Name	Hometown	School	Height	Weight	Commit date
			N/A	N/A	
Recruit ratings: No ratings found
Overall recruit ranking:
Note: In many cases, Scout, Rivals, 247Sports, On3, and ESPN may conflict in their listings of height and weight.; In these cases, the average was taken. ESPN grades are on a 100-point scale.; Sources: "2020 Team Ranking". Rivals.

== Roster ==
2019–20 Charlotte 49ers men's basketball team
Players
Coaches

Pos.	#	Name	Height	Weight	Year	Previous school	Hometown
G	0	Caleb Stone-Carrawell	6 ft 7 in (2.01 m)	215 lb (98 kg)	Fr	Cox Mill High School	Concord, NC
G	1	Jahmir Young	6 ft 1 in (1.85 m)	185 lb (84 kg)	Fr	DeMatha Catholic High School	Upper Marlboro, MD
G	2	Seth Bennett (W)	6 ft 3 in (1.91 m)	185 lb (84 kg)	Fr	Charlotte Christian School	Charlotte, NC
G	3	Brice Williams	6 ft 7 in (2.01 m)	215 lb (98 kg)	Fr	Hopewell High School	Huntersville, NC
F	5	Milos Supica	6 ft 9 in (2.06 m)	230 lb (104 kg)	Jr	Freedom Christian Academy	Belgrade, Serbia
G	10	Cooper Robb	6 ft 1 in (1.85 m)	190 lb (86 kg)	So	Scott County High School	Georgetown, KY
F	11	Bo Blight (W)	6 ft 8 in (2.03 m)	210 lb (95 kg)	RS Jr	South Mecklenburg High School	Charlotte, NC
G	12	Malik Martin	6 ft 6 in (1.98 m)	210 lb (95 kg)	So	Curtis High School	Staten Island, NY
G	13	Jordan Shepherd	6 ft 4 in (1.93 m)	185 lb (84 kg)	RS Jr	Asheville Christian Academy; Oklahoma	Asheville, NC
F	15	Amidou Bamba	6 ft 9 in (2.06 m)	255 lb (116 kg)	GS	High Point Christian Academy; Coastal Carolina	Toronto, ON
G	22	Brandon Younger	6 ft 7 in (2.01 m)	185 lb (84 kg)	So	Wheeler High School	Marietta, GA
G	25	Drew Edwards	6 ft 4 in (1.93 m)	185 lb (84 kg)	GS	Calvert Hall High School; Providence	Perry Hall, MD
G	30	Tyler Bertram	6 ft 3 in (1.91 m)	185 lb (84 kg)	RS Fr	Vermont Academy	Cooperstown, NY
F/C	31	Anzac Rissetto	6 ft 10 in (2.08 m)	265 lb (120 kg)	Fr	Auckland Grammar School	Auckland, New Zealand
G	35	Luka Vasic	6 ft 8 in (2.03 m)	205 lb (93 kg)	RS So	Avon Old Farms	Pirot, Serbia

Head coach

- Ron Sanchez (SUNY Oneonta)

Assistant coach(es)

- Aaron Fearne (Mayville State)
- Kotie Kimble (Coastal Carolina)
- Vic Sfera (Memphis)

Legend

- (C) Team captain
- (S) Suspended
- (I) Ineligible
- (W) Walk-on
- Injured
- Current redshirt

Roster
Last update: January 16, 2020

== Schedule and results ==
Date time, TV	Rank^{#}	Opponent^{#}	Result	Record	Site (attendance) city, state
Exhibition
October 25, 2019*; 7:00 p.m., UNC Charlotte TV		Georgia; Benefit Exhibition Game	L 69–77		Dale F. Halton Arena (2,117); Charlotte, NC
Non-conference regular season
November 6, 2019*; 7:30 p.m., FloHoops		at James Madison	L 74–79	0–1	JMU Convocation Center (3,083); Harrisonburg, VA
November 12, 2019*; 7:00 p.m., UNC Charlotte TV		Davidson	W 71–58	1–1	Dale F. Halton Arena (4,341); Charlotte, NC
November 17, 2019*; 6:00 p.m., ESPNU		Wake Forest	W 67–65	2–1	Dale F. Halton Arena (4,819); Charlotte, NC
November 21, 2019*; 7:00 p.m., ESPN+		at Appalachian State	L 55–64	2–2	Holmes Center (2,203); Boone, NC
November 27, 2019*; 2:00 p.m., ESPN+		at Georgia State	L 78–81 ^{OT}	2–3	GSU Sports Arena (1,468); Atlanta, GA
November 30, 2019*; 4:00 p.m., CUSA.tv		USC Upstate	W 83–47	3–3	Dale F. Halton Arena (2,593); Charlotte, NC
December 3, 2019*; 7:00 p.m., UNC Charlotte TV		UNC Asheville	L 75–83	3–4	Dale F. Halton Arena (3,324); Charlotte, NC
December 7, 2019*; 2:00 p.m., FloHoops		at UNC Wilmington	W 76–57	4–4	Trask Coliseum (3,121); Wilmington, NC
December 16, 2019*; 7:00 p.m., CUSA.tv		Valparaiso	W 67–57	5–4	Dale F. Halton Arena (2,740); Charlotte, NC
December 19, 2019*; 7:00 p.m., CUSA.tv		Maryland Eastern Shore	W 66–44	6–4	Dale F. Halton Arena (2,580); Charlotte, NC
December 22, 2019*; 4:00 p.m., ESPN3		at East Carolina	L 56–60	6–5	Williams Arena (3,626); Greenville, NC
Conference USA regular season
January 2, 2020; 7:00 p.m., ESPN+		UAB	W 51–44	7–5 (1–0)	Dale F. Halton Arena (3,015); Charlotte, NC
January 4, 2020; 4:00 p.m., ESPN+		Middle Tennessee	W 68–62	8–5 (2–0)	Dale F. Halton Arena (3,538); Charlotte, NC
January 11, 2020; 4:00 p.m., ESPN+		Old Dominion	W 53–47	9–5 (3–0)	Dale F. Halton Arena (4,524); Charlotte, NC
January 16, 2020; 7:00 p.m., ESPN+		at Marshall	W 77–75	10–5 (4–0)	Cam Henderson Center (5,462); Huntington, WV
January 18, 2020; 5:00 p.m., ESPN3		at Western Kentucky	L 63–80	10–6 (4–1)	E. A. Diddle Arena (4,677); Bowling Green, KY
January 20, 2020; 4:00 p.m., ESPN+		at Old Dominion	L 62–66	10–7 (4–2)	Chartway Arena (5,490); Norfolk, VA
January 23, 2020; 7:00 p.m., ESPN+		Florida Atlantic	W 70–68	11–7 (5–2)	Dale F. Halton Arena (3,752); Charlotte, NC
January 25, 2020; 4:00 p.m., ESPN+		FIU	W 75–49	12–7 (6–2)	Dale F. Halton Arena (4,616); Charlotte, NC
January 30, 2020; 7:30 p.m., ESPN+		at Louisiana Tech	L 59–72	12–8 (6–3)	Thomas Assembly Center (2,930); Ruston, LA
February 1, 2020; 3:00 p.m., ESPN+		at Southern Miss	L 68–74 ^{OT}	12–9 (6–4)	Reed Green Coliseum (3,840); Hattiesburg, MS
February 6, 2020; 7:00 p.m., ESPN+		UTEP	W 68–64	13–9 (7–4)	Dale F. Halton Arena (2,828); Charlotte, NC
February 8, 2020; 4:00 p.m., ESPN+		UTSA	W 91–84	14–9 (8–4)	Dale F. Halton Arena (4,679); Charlotte, NC
February 13, 2020; 8:00 p.m., CUSA.tv		at North Texas	L 72–81	14–10 (8–5)	The Super Pit (4,086); Denton, TX
February 15, 2020; 3:00 p.m., ESPN+		at Rice	L 54–70	14–11 (8–6)	Tudor Fieldhouse (2,872); Houston, TX
February 22, 2020; 7:00 p.m., CBSSN on Facebook		at Western Kentucky	W 72–70	15–11 (9–6)	E. A. Diddle Arena (5,391); Bowling Green, KY
March 1, 2020; 2:00 p.m., Stadium		FIU	L 52–67	15–12 (9–7)	Dale F. Halton Arena (3,116); Charlotte, NC
March 4, 2020; 7:00 p.m., CBSSN on Facebook		North Texas	W 56–43	16–12 (10–7)	Dale F. Halton Arena (2,811); Charlotte, NC
March 7, 2020; 7:00 p.m., CUSA.tv		at Louisiana Tech	L 43–66	16–13 (10–8)	Thomas Assembly Center (3,359); Ruston, LA
Conference USA tournament
March 12, 2020; 7:30 p.m., Facebook	(4)	vs. (5) FIU; Quarterfinals	Tournament canceled		Ford Center at The Star; Frisco, TX
*Non-conference game. ^{#}Rankings from AP poll. (#) Tournament seedings in parentheses. All times are in Eastern.
