= 2019–20 FIU Panthers men's basketball team =

American college basketball season

2019–20 FIU Panthers men's basketball
- Conference: Conference USA
- Record: 19–13 (9–9 C-USA)
- Head coach: Jeremy Ballard (2nd season)
- Associate head coach: David Cason
- Assistant coaches: Jesse Bopp; Joey Rodriguez
- Home arena: Ocean Bank Convocation Center

2019–20 Conference USA men's basketball standings
	Conf.				Overall
Team	W		L	PCT	W		L	PCT
North Texas	14	–	4	.778	20	–	11	.645
Western Kentucky	13	–	5	.722	20	–	10	.667
Louisiana Tech	13	–	5	.722	22	–	8	.733
Charlotte	10	–	8	.556	16	–	13	.552
FIU	9	–	9	.500	19	–	13	.594
Marshall	10	–	8	.556	17	–	15	.531
UAB	9	–	9	.500	19	–	13	.594
Old Dominion	9	–	9	.500	13	–	19	.406
Florida Atlantic	8	–	10	.444	17	–	15	.531
UTSA	7	–	11	.389	13	–	19	.406
UTEP	8	–	10	.444	17	–	15	.531
Rice	7	–	11	.389	15	–	17	.469
Southern Miss	5	–	13	.278	9	–	22	.290
Middle Tennessee	4	–	14	.222	8	–	23	.258
Note: The 2020 C-USA tournament was canceled prior to the quarterfinals due to the COVID-19 pandemic.

The 2019–20 FIU Panthers men's basketball team represented Florida International University in the 2019–20 NCAA Division I men's basketball season. The Panthers, led by second-year head coach Jeremy Ballard, played their home games at Ocean Bank Convocation Center in Miami, Florida as members of Conference USA. They finished the season 19–13, 9–9 in CUSA play to finish in fifth place. They defeated Rice in the first round of the C-USA tournament and were set to face Charlotte in the quarterfinals before the remainder of the tournament was canceled amid the COVID-19 pandemic.

== Previous season ==
The Panthers finished the 2018–19 season 20–14 overall, 10–8 in C-USA play to finish in 7th place. In the C-USA tournament, they were defeated by North Texas in the first round. They were invited to the CIT, where they defeated Texas State in the first round before falling to Green Bay in the second round.

== Roster ==
2019–20 FIU Panthers men's basketball team
Players
Coaches

Pos.	#	Name	Height	Weight	Year	Previous school	Hometown
F	0	Dimon Carrigan	6 ft 9 in (2.06 m)	215 lb (98 kg)	Jr	Odessa College	Boston, Massachusetts
G	1	Isaiah Banks	6 ft 5 in (1.96 m)	180 lb (82 kg)	Jr	Heritage	Conyers, Georgia
G	2	Blake Furcron	6 ft 4 in (1.93 m)	175 lb (79 kg)	RS Jr	Pratt CC	Romulus, Michigan
G	3	Trejon Jacob	6 ft 5 in (1.96 m)	175 lb (79 kg)	Sr	Seminole State College	Raleigh, North Carolina
G/F	4	Eric Lovett	6 ft 5 in (1.96 m)	200 lb (91 kg)	Jr	Missouri State–West Plains	Jonesboro, Georgia
G	5	Antonio Daye, Jr.	6 ft 1 in (1.85 m)	188 lb (85 kg)	So	Fort Lauderdale HS	Durham, North Carolina
F	10	Sedee Keita	6 ft 9 in (2.06 m)	235 lb (107 kg)	RS Jr	St. John's	Philadelphia, Pennsylvania
G	11	Tevin Brewer	5 ft 8 in (1.73 m)	160 lb (73 kg)	Jr	Coffeyville CC	Fort Smith, Arkansas
G/F	12	Dante Wilcox	6 ft 6 in (1.98 m)	220 lb (100 kg)	Fr	Oxbridge Academy	West Palm Beach, Florida
F	15	James Ametepe	6 ft 5 in (1.96 m)	210 lb (95 kg)	So	Westwood Christian School	Accra, Ghana
G	21	Jonathan Nunez	5 ft 11 in (1.8 m)	180 lb (82 kg)	Fr	Doral Academy Prep	Miami, Florida
F	34	Osasumwen Osaghae	6 ft 9 in (2.06 m)	250 lb (113 kg)	Sr	Robert Morgan	Miami, Florida
F	50	Devon Andrews	6 ft 6 in (1.98 m)	190 lb (86 kg)	RS Sr	Pratt CC; Kent State	Lorain, Ohio
G	55	Cameron Corcoran	6 ft 1 in (1.85 m)	170 lb (77 kg)	RS So	Little Rock	Orlando, Florida

Head coach

- Jeremy Ballard (Colgate)

Assistant coach(es)

- David Cason (Illinois State)
- Jesse Bopp (Plymouth State)
- Joey Rodriguez (VCU)

Legend

- (C) Team captain
- (S) Suspended
- (I) Ineligible
- (W) Walk-on
- Injured
- Current redshirt

Roster
Last update: January 14, 2020

== Schedule and results ==
Date time, TV	Rank^{#}	Opponent^{#}	Result	Record	Site (attendance) city, state
Non-conference regular season
November 5, 2019*; 8:00 pm, SECN+		at Mississippi State	L 69–77	0–1	Humphrey Coliseum (6,230); Starkville, MS
November 8, 2019*; 8:30 pm		Ave Maria	W 101–59	1–1	Ocean Bank Convocation Center (984); Miami, FL
November 13, 2019*; 9:00 pm, ACCNX		at NC State	L 77–86	1–2	PNC Arena (14,024); Raleigh, NC
November 19, 2019*; 7:00 pm, ESPN+		at Cleveland State; Battle for the Capital	W 107–61	2–2	Wolstein Center (1,524); Cleveland, OH
November 22, 2019*; 3:30 pm, FloHoops		vs. Eastern Kentucky; Battle for the Capital	W 89–70	3–2	Entertainment and Sports Arena (512); Washington, D.C.
November 23, 2019*; 1:00 pm, FloHoops		vs. UNC Wilmington; Battle for the Capital	L 63–66	3–3	Entertainment and Sports Arena (739); Washington, D.C.
November 26, 2019*; 7:00 pm, CUSA.tv		Keiser	W 96–82	4–3	Ocean Bank Convocation Center (1,051); Miami, FL
November 30, 2019*; 7:00 pm, CUSA.tv		New Hampshire	W 70–69	5–3	Ocean Bank Convocation Center (653); Miami, FL
December 4, 2019*; 7:00 pm, CUSA.tv		Florida Gulf Coast	W 71–53	6–3	Ocean Bank Convocation Center (1,408); Miami, FL
December 7, 2019*; 1:00 pm, ESPN+		at Kennesaw State	W 84–81	7–3	KSU Convocation Center (1,202); Kennesaw, GA
December 19, 2019*; 5:00 pm, CUSA.tv		Florida Memorial	W 99–74	8–3	Ocean Bank Convocation Center; Miami, FL
December 22, 2019*; 2:00 pm, ESPN+		at Stetson	W 83–67	9–3	Edmunds Center (363); DeLand, FL
December 28, 2019*; 4:00 pm, BTN		at Minnesota	L 62–89	9–4	Williams Arena (10,546); Minneapolis, MN
Conference USA regular season
January 2, 2020; 12:00 pm, ESPN+		UTEP	W 69–67	10–4 (1–0)	Ocean Bank Convocation Center (525); Miami, FL
January 4, 2020; 7:00 pm, ESPN+		UTSA	W 90–83 ^{OT}	11–4 (2–0)	Ocean Bank Convocation Center (543); Miami, FL
January 9, 2020; 8:00 pm, ESPN+		at North Texas	L 56–74	11–5 (2–1)	The Super Pit (2,262); Denton, TX
January 11, 2020; 3:00 pm, ESPN+		at Rice	L 78–92	11–6 (2–2)	Tudor Fieldhouse (1,490); Houston, TX
January 16, 2020; 7:00 pm, ESPN+		UAB	W 93–68	12–6 (3–2)	Ocean Bank Convocation Center (915); Miami, FL
January 18, 2020; 7:00 pm, ESPN+		Middle Tennessee	W 83–68	13–6 (4–2)	Ocean Bank Convocation Center (2,179); Miami, FL
January 23, 2020; 7:00 pm, ESPNU		at Old Dominion	W 83–80	14–6 (5–2)	Chartway Arena (5,443); Norfolk, VA
January 25, 2020; 4:00 pm, ESPN+		at Charlotte	L 49–75	14–7 (5–3)	Dale F. Halton Arena (4,616); Charlotte, NC
January 30, 2020; 7:00 pm, ESPN+		Marshall	L 74–84	14–8 (5–4)	Ocean Bank Convocation Center (1,117); Miami, FL
February 1, 2020; 12:00 pm, Stadium Facebook		Western Kentucky	W 81–76	15–8 (6–4)	Ocean Bank Convocation Center (695); Miami, FL
February 5, 2020; 7:00 pm, ESPN+		Florida Atlantic	W 69–50	16–8 (7–4)	Ocean Bank Convocation Center (2,734); Miami, FL
February 8, 2020; 4:00 pm, ESPN+		at Florida Atlantic	W 66–59	17–8 (8–4)	RoofClaim.com Arena (1,943); Boca Raton, FL
February 13, 2020; 7:30 pm, ESPN+		at Louisiana Tech	L 57–60	17–9 (8–5)	Thomas Assembly Center (2,951); Ruston, LA
February 15, 2020; 3:00 pm, ESPN+		at Southern Miss	L 67–75	17–10 (8–6)	Reed Green Coliseum (4,059); Hattiesburg, MS
February 27, 2020; 7:00 pm, Stadium		North Texas	L 59–78	17–11 (8–7)	Ocean Bank Convocation Center (644); Miami, FL
March 1, 2020; 2:00 pm, Stadium		at Charlotte	W 67–52	18–11 (9–7)	Dale F. Halton Arena (3,116); Charlotte, NC
March 4, 2020; 7:30 pm, CUSA.tv		at Louisiana Tech	L 73–76	18–12 (9–8)	Thomas Assembly Center (2,631); Ruston, LA
March 7, 2020; 7:00 pm, CBSSN on Facebook		Western Kentucky	L 85–91	18–13 (9–9)	Ocean Bank Convocation Center; Miami, FL
Conference USA tournament
March 11, 2020; 6:30 pm, ESPN+	(5)	vs. (12) Rice; First round	W 85–76	19–13	Ford Center at The Star; Frisco, TX
March 12, 2020; 7:30 pm, Facebook	(5)	vs. (4) Charlotte; Quarterfinals	C-USA Tournament Canceled		Ford Center at The Star; Frisco, TX
*Non-conference game. ^{#}Rankings from AP Poll. (#) Tournament seedings in parentheses. All times are in Eastern.
