= 2019–20 Florida Atlantic Owls men's basketball team =

American college basketball season

2019–20 Florida Atlantic Owls men's basketball
- Conference: Conference USA
- Record: 17–15 (8–10 C-USA)
- Head coach: Dusty May (2nd season)
- Assistant coaches: Akeem Miskdeen; Kyle Church; Todd Abernethy
- Home arena: FAU Arena

2019–20 Conference USA men's basketball standings
	Conf.				Overall
Team	W		L	PCT	W		L	PCT
North Texas	14	–	4	.778	20	–	11	.645
Western Kentucky	13	–	5	.722	20	–	10	.667
Louisiana Tech	13	–	5	.722	22	–	8	.733
Charlotte	10	–	8	.556	16	–	13	.552
FIU	9	–	9	.500	19	–	13	.594
Marshall	10	–	8	.556	17	–	15	.531
UAB	9	–	9	.500	19	–	13	.594
Old Dominion	9	–	9	.500	13	–	19	.406
Florida Atlantic	8	–	10	.444	17	–	15	.531
UTSA	7	–	11	.389	13	–	19	.406
UTEP	8	–	10	.444	17	–	15	.531
Rice	7	–	11	.389	15	–	17	.469
Southern Miss	5	–	13	.278	9	–	22	.290
Middle Tennessee	4	–	14	.222	8	–	23	.258
Note: The 2020 C-USA tournament was canceled prior to the quarterfinals due to the COVID-19 pandemic.

The 2019–20 Florida Atlantic Owls men's basketball team represented Florida Atlantic University in the 2019–20 NCAA Division I men's basketball season. The Owls, led by 2nd-year head coach Dusty May, played their home games at FAU Arena in Boca Raton, Florida as members of Conference USA. They finished the season 17–15, 8–10 in C-USA play to finish in ninth place. They defeated Old Dominion in the first round of the C-USA tournament and were set to take on North Texas in the quarterfinals. However, the remainder of the tournament was canceled amid the COVID-19 pandemic.

== Previous season ==
The Owls finished the 2018–19 season 17–16 overall, 8–10 in C-USA play to finish in a four-way tie for 9th place. In the C-USA tournament, they were defeated by Louisiana Tech in the first round. They were invited to the CIT, where they lost to Charleston Southern in the first round.

== Roster ==
2019–20 Florida Atlantic Owls men's basketball team
Players
Coaches

Pos.	#	Name	Height	Weight	Year	Previous school	Hometown
G	0	Cornelius Taylor	6 ft 0 in (1.83 m)	180 lb (82 kg)	GS	Claxton HS; Lincoln Memorial	Claxton, Georgia
F	1	Madiaw Niang	6 ft 9 in (2.06 m)	210 lb (95 kg)	So	DME Academy	Dakar, Senegal
G	2	Everett Winchester	6 ft 7 in (2.01 m)	215 lb (98 kg)	RS Jr	Gilman School; Wright State	Baltimore, Maryland
F	3	Jaylen Sebree	6 ft 7 in (2.01 m)	190 lb (86 kg)	So	Christian County HS; IMG Academy	Hopkinsville, Kentucky
G	4	D.J. Robertson	6 ft 1 in (1.85 m)	160 lb (73 kg)	Fr	Athens Drive HS	Raleigh, North Carolina
G	5	Carrington McCaskill	6 ft 7 in (2.01 m)	190 lb (86 kg)	Fr	Renaissance HS	Detroit, Michigan
G	11	Michael Forrest	6 ft 0 in (1.83 m)	170 lb (77 kg)	So	Blanche Ely HS	Lauderhill, Florida
F/C	12	Aleksandar Zecevic	6 ft 10 in (2.08 m)	245 lb (111 kg)	Sr	Scotland Performance Institute; San Jacinto College	Novi Sad, Serbia
G	13	Kenan Blackshear	6 ft 6 in (1.98 m)	215 lb (98 kg)	Fr	Jones HS	Orlando, Florida
F	15	Jailyn Ingram	6 ft 7 in (2.01 m)	215 lb (98 kg)	Jr	Morgan County HS	Madison, Georgia
G	21	Alejandro Ralat	5 ft 11 in (1.8 m)	160 lb (73 kg)	Fr	Saint Andrew's School	San Juan, Puerto Rico
G	23	Richardson Maitre	6 ft 3 in (1.91 m)	180 lb (82 kg)	Jr	West Oaks Academy; Indian Hills CC	Montreal, Canada
F/C	25	Karlis Silins	6 ft 11 in (2.11 m)	240 lb (109 kg)	RS So	BK VEF Rīga; Ole Miss	Riga, Latvia
F	32	Brant Ulmer	6 ft 7 in (2.01 m)	195 lb (88 kg)	Fr	Suwannee HS	Live Oak, Florida
F/C	35	Dardan Kapiti	6 ft 10 in (2.08 m)	210 lb (95 kg)	Fr	The Rock School	Prishtina, Kosovo

Head coach

- Dusty May (Indiana)

Assistant coach(es)

- Akeem Miskdeen (Queens (NC))
- Kyle Church (Charlotte)
- Todd Abernethy (Mississippi)

Legend

- (C) Team captain
- (S) Suspended
- (I) Ineligible
- (W) Walk-on
- Injured
- Current redshirt

Roster
Last update: January 15, 2020

== Schedule and results ==
Date time, TV	Rank^{#}	Opponent^{#}	Result	Record	Site (attendance) city, state
Exhibition
October 25, 2019*; 7:00 pm		Lynn	W 92–75		FAU Arena; Boca Raton, FL
Non-conference regular season
November 5, 2019*; 7:00 pm, CUSA.tv		Flagler	W 92–81	1–0	FAU Arena (1,112); Boca Raton, FL
November 8, 2019*; 7:00 pm, Fox Sports Florida		at Miami (FL)	L 60–74	1–1	Watsco Center (5,168); Coral Gables, FL
November 11, 2019*; 9:00 pm, SECN+		at Alabama	L 59–78	1–2	Coleman Coliseum (9,117); Tuscaloosa, AL
November 16, 2019*; 4:00 pm, CUSA.tv		Palm Beach Atlantic	W 84–79	2–2	FAU Arena; Boca Raton, FL
November 20, 2019*; 7:30 pm, ESPN+		at Florida Gulf Coast	L 70–72 ^{OT}	2–3	Alico Arena (3,076); Fort Myers, FL
November 29, 2019*; 7:00 pm, CUSA.tv		Holy Cross; Boca Raton Beach Classic	W 87–69	3–3	FAU Arena (1,036); Boca Raton, FL
December 1, 2019*; 6:00 pm, CUSA.tv		UIC; Boca Raton Beach Classic	W 71–70	4–3	FAU Arena; Boca Raton, FL
December 2, 2019*; 8:00 pm, CUSA.tv		St. Bonaventure; Boca Raton Beach Classic	L 64–71	4–4	FAU Arena (1,122); Boca Raton, FL
December 4, 2019*; 7:00 pm, CUSA.tv		Canisius; Boca Raton Beach Classic	W 62–59	5–4	FAU Arena (987); Boca Raton, FL
December 14, 2019*; 4:00 pm, CUSA.tv		High Point	W 81–64	6–4	FAU Arena (1,350); Boca Raton, FL
December 19, 2019*; 7:00 pm, CUSA.tv		Tampa	W 84–35	7–4	FAU Arena (627); Boca Raton, FL
December 22, 2019*; 6:00 pm, ESPN+		at Mercer	W 65–50	8–4	Hawkins Arena (1,932); Macon, GA
December 29, 2019*; 5:00 pm, ESPN3		at South Florida	L 58–60	8–5	Yuengling Center (2,707); Tampa, FL
Conference USA regular season
January 2, 2020; 7:00 pm, ESPN+		UTSA	W 79–64	9–5 (1–0)	RoofClaim.com Arena (Note: On December 20, the team's arena, formerly known as FAU Arena, was renamed RoofClaim.com Arena, after RoofClaim.com became the arena's sponsor.) (747); Boca Raton, FL
January 4, 2020; 4:00 pm, ESPN+		UTEP	W 59–56	10–5 (2–0)	RoofClaim.com Arena (830); Boca Raton, FL
January 9, 2020; 8:00 pm, ESPN+		at Rice	W 81–76	11–5 (3–0)	Tudor Fieldhouse (1,170); Houston, TX
January 11, 2020; 4:00 pm, ESPN+		at North Texas	L 58–81	11–6 (3–1)	The Super Pit (2,305); Denton, TX
January 16, 2020; 7:00 pm, ESPN+		Middle Tennessee	W 97–94	12–6 (4–1)	RoofClaim.com Arena (2,002); Boca Raton, FL
January 18, 2020; 4:00 pm, ESPN+		UAB	L 65–68	12–7 (4–2)	RoofClaim.com Arena (1,314); Boca Raton, FL
January 23, 2020; 7:00 pm, ESPN+		at Charlotte	L 68–70	12–8 (4–3)	Dale F. Halton Arena (3,752); Charlotte, NC
January 25, 2020; 7:00 pm, ESPN+		at Old Dominion	L 55–65	12–9 (4–4)	Chartway Arena (7,618); Norfolk, VA
January 30, 2020; 7:00 pm, Stadium Facebook		Western Kentucky	W 69–65	13–9 (5–4)	RoofClaim.com Arena (1,253); Boca Raton, FL
February 1, 2020; 4:00 pm, ESPN+		Marshall	W 91–73	14–9 (6–4)	RoofClaim.com Arena (1,514); Boca Raton, FL
February 5, 2020; 7:00 pm, ESPN+		at FIU	L 50–69	14–10 (6–5)	Ocean Bank Convocation Center (2,734); Miami, FL
February 8, 2020; 4:00 pm, ESPN+		FIU	L 59–66	14–11 (6–6)	FAU Arena (1,943); Boca Raton, FL
February 13, 2020; 8:00 pm, ESPN+		at Southern Miss	L 66–68	14–12 (6–7)	Reed Green Coliseum; Hattiesburg, MS
February 15, 2020; 3:00 pm, ESPN+		at Louisiana Tech	L 68–81	14–13 (6–8)	Thomas Assembly Center (4,186); Ruston, LA
February 22, 2020; 7:00 pm, CUSA.tv		UAB	W 65–58	15–13 (7–8)	FAU Arena (914); Boca Raton, FL
February 27, 2020; 7:00 pm, ESPN+		UTSA	W 80–71	16–13 (8–8)	FAU Arena (1,164); Boca Raton, FL
March 1, 2020; 2:00 pm, ESPN3		at Old Dominion	L 80–85 ^{OT}	16–14 (8–9)	Chartway Arena (5,031); Norfolk, VA
March 4, 2020; 7:00 pm, Stadium		at Marshall	L 82–94	16–15 (8–10)	Cam Henderson Center (5,426); Huntington, WV
Conference USA tournament
March 11, 2020; 7:00 pm, ESPN+	(9)	vs. (8) Old Dominion; First round	W 66–56	17–15	Ford Center at The Star; Frisco, TX
March 12, 2020; 6:00 pm, Stadium	(9)	vs. (1) North Texas; Quarterfinals	C-USA Tournament Canceled		Ford Center at The Star; Frisco, TX
*Non-conference game. ^{#}Rankings from AP Poll. (#) Tournament seedings in parentheses. All times are in Eastern.
