= Jay Ladner =

American basketball coach (born 1965)

Current position
- Title: Head coach
- Team: Southern Miss
- Conference: Sun Belt
- Record: 95–127 (.428)

Biographical details
- Born: December 8, 1965 (age 60); Hattiesburg, Mississippi, U.S.

Playing career
- 1984–1988: Southern Miss

Coaching career (HC unless noted)
- 1992–2011: St. Stanislaus HS (MS)
- 2011–2012: Oak Grove HS (MS)
- 2012–2014: Jones County JC
- 2014–2019: Southeastern Louisiana
- 2019–present: Southern Miss

Head coaching record
- Overall: 170–215 (.442) (college); 511–189 (.730) (high school); 45–13 (.776) (junior college)
- Tournaments: 0–2 (NIT)

Accomplishments and honors

Championships
- Southland regular season (2018); Sun Belt regular season (2023)

Awards
- Sun Belt Coach of the Year (2023)

Jay Ladner (born December 8, 1965) is an American basketball coach. He is the head men's basketball coach of the Southern Miss Golden Eagles men's basketball team.

== Playing career ==
Ladner played college basketball at Southern Miss where he was part of the Golden Eagles' 1987 NIT Championship team.

== Coaching career ==
In 1992, Ladner began coaching in the high school ranks, first at St. Stanislaus HS, where he guided the team to 10 state tournament appearances from 1992–2011 before moving on to his high school alma mater Oak Grove HS. His overall high school coaching record was 511–189 Ladner would move into the junior college ranks as the head coach at Jones County Junior College where in 2014 he led the Bobcats to the NJCAA Division I National Championship, becoming the lowest seed to ever win the national championship.

In 2014, Ladner was named the head coach at Southeastern Louisiana where he guided the team to a 76–88 record and a Southland Conference regular season title and the program's first NIT appearance in 2018. On April 18, 2019 Ladner was named the head men's basketball coach at his alma mater, Southern Miss, replacing Doc Sadler.

On February 6, 2024, Ladner suffered a heart attack and need defibrillators to restore his heart rhythm. He did not Coach for the remainder of the regular season and returned for the Sun Belt tourney.

== Head coaching record ==
=== NJCAA ===
Record table
Season	Team	Overall	Conference	Standing	Postseason
Jones County JC (MACJC) (2012–2014)
2012–13	Jones County JC	17–8	N/A		
2013–14	Jones County JC	28–5	N/A		NJCAA Division I Champion
Jones County JC:		45–13 (.776)			
Total:		45–13 (.776)			
National champion Postseason invitational champion Conference regular season champion Conference regular season and conference tournament champion Division regular season champion Division regular season and conference tournament champion Conference tournament champion

=== NCAA DI ===
Record table
Season	Team	Overall	Conference	Standing	Postseason
Southeastern Louisiana Lions (Southland Conference) (2014–2019)
2014–15	Southeastern Louisiana	9–23	6–12	T–10th	
2015–16	Southeastern Louisiana	12–21	9–9	6th	
2016–17	Southeastern Louisiana	16–16	9–9	7th	
2017–18	Southeastern Louisiana	22–12	15–3	T–1st	NIT First Round
2018–19	Southeastern Louisiana	17–16	12–6	T–3rd	
Southeastern Louisiana:		76–88 (.463)	51–39 (.567)		
Southern Miss Golden Eagles (Conference USA) (2019–2022)
2019–20	Southern Miss	9–22	5–13	13th	
2020–21	Southern Miss	8–17	4–13	7th (West)	
2021–22	Southern Miss	7–26	1–17	7th (West)	
Southern Miss Golden Eagles (Sun Belt Conference) (2022–present)
2022–23	Southern Miss	25–8	14–4	1st	NIT First Round
2023–24	Southern Miss	16–16	9–9	6th	
2024–25	Southern Miss	11–22	5–13	12th	
2025–26	Southern Miss	19–16	9–9	T–8th	
2026–27	Southern Miss	0–0	0–0		
Southern Miss:		95–127 (.428)	47–78 (.376)		
Total:		171–215 (.443)			
National champion Postseason invitational champion Conference regular season champion Conference regular season and conference tournament champion Division regular season champion Division regular season and conference tournament champion Conference tournament champion
