= Baylor Bears men's basketball statistical leaders =

The Baylor Bears men's basketball statistical leaders are individual statistical leaders of the Baylor Bears men's basketball program in various categories, including points, rebounds, assists, steals, and blocks. Within those areas, the lists identify single-game, single-season, and career leaders. The Bears represent Baylor University in the NCAA Division I Big 12 Conference.

Baylor began competing in intercollegiate basketball in 1907. However, the school's record book does not generally list records from before the 1950s, as records from before this period are often incomplete and inconsistent. Since scoring was much lower in this era, and teams played much fewer games during a typical season, it is likely that few or no players from this era would appear on these lists anyway.

The NCAA has recorded scoring statistics throughout the "modern era" of basketball, which it defines as starting with the 1937–38 season, the first after the center jump after each made field goal was abolished. Individual rebounding was first recorded in 1950–51, as were individual assists. While rebounding has been recorded in every subsequent season, the NCAA stopped recording individual assists after the 1951–52 season. Assists were not reinstated as an official statistic in Division I until the 1983–84 season. Blocks and steals were first recorded in D-I in 1988–89. Baylor's record books include players in all named statistics, regardless of whether they were officially recorded by the NCAA or any other national governing body.

These lists are updated through the end of the 2020–21 season.

== Scoring ==
Career
Rk	Player	Points	Seasons
1	LaceDarius Dunn	2,285	2007-08 2008-09 2009-10 2010-11
2	Terry Teagle	2,189	1978-79 1979-80 1980-81 1981-82
3	Micheal Williams	1,854	1984-85 1985-86 1986-87 1987-88
4	Curtis Jerrells	1,820	2005-06 2006-07 2007-08 2008-09
5	Brian Skinner	1,702	1994-95 1995-96 1996-97 1997-98
6	Darryl Middleton	1,677	1984-85 1985-86 1986-87 1987-88
7	Aundre Branch	1,666	1991-92 1992-93 1993-94 1994-95
8	Tweety Carter	1,447	2006-07 2007-08 2008-09 2009-10
9	Kevin Rogers	1,371	2005-06 2006-07 2007-08 2008-09
10	Darrell Hardy	1,360	1964-65 1965-66 1966-67
	Quincy Acy	1,360	2008-09 2009-10 2010-11 2011-12

Season
Rk	Player	Points	Season
1	Pierre Jackson	712	2012-13
2	LaceDarius Dunn	704	2009-10
3	Darryl Middleton	666	1987-88
4	Vinnie Johnson	656	1978-79
5	Cameron Carr	642	2025-26
6	Curtis Jerrells	635	2008-09
7	Micheal Williams	625	1987-88
8	Terry Teagle	622	1981-82
9	Terry Teagle	620	1979-80
10	LaceDarius Dunn	614	2008-09

Single game
Rk	Player	Points	Season	Opponent
1	Vinnie Johnson	50	1978-79	TCU
2	Vinnie Johnson	43	1977-78	San Francisco
	LaceDarius Dunn	43	2010-11	Morgan State
4	William Chatmon	41	1970-71	Midwestern State
	Carlos Briggs	41	1984-85	Rice
6	Darrell Hardy	40	1965-66	Texas
	Makai Mason	40	2018-19	TCU
8	Darryl Middleton	38	1987-88	Rice
	LaceDarius Dunn	38	2007-08	Texas Tech
10	Roy Thomas	37	1971-72	SMU
	Vinnie Johnson	37	1977-78	TCU
	Terry Teagle	37	1981-82	TCU
	David Wesley	37	1991-92	SMU
	Tounde Yessoufou	37	2025-26	BYU

== Rebounds ==
Career
Rk	Player	Rebounds	Seasons
1	Rico Gathers	1,134	2012-13 2013-14 2014-15 2015-16
2	Brian Skinner	915	1994-95 1995-96 1996-97 1997-98
3	Jerry Mallett	877	1954-55 1955-56 1956-57
4	Kevin Rogers	865	2005-06 2006-07 2007-08 2008-09
5	Darrell Hardy	836	1964-65 1965-66 1966-67
6	Quincy Acy	828	2008-09 2009-10 2010-11 2011-12
7	Mark Vital	810	2017–18 2018–19 2019–20 2020–21
8	Terry Teagle	805	1978-79 1979-80 1980-81 1981-82
9	Darryl Middleton	730	1984-85 1985-86 1986-87 1987-88
10	Doug Brandt	726	1993-94 1994-95 1995-96 1996-97

Season
Rk	Player	Rebounds	Season
1	Rico Gathers	394	2014-15
2	Norchad Omier	379	2024-25
3	Charles McKinney	375	1973-74
4	William Chatmon	369	1970-71
5	Jerome Lambert	355	1993-94
6	Ekpe Udoh	351	2009-10
7	Jerry Mallett	345	1956-57
8	Johnathan Motley	335	2016-17
9	Jerry Mallett	314	1954-55
10	Darrell Hardy	312	1965-66
	Cory Jefferson	312	2013-14

Single game
Rk	Player	Rebounds	Season	Opponent
1	Rico Gathers	28	2014-15	Huston-Tillotson
2	Jerry Mallett	27	1954-55	North Texas
3	William Chatmon	26	1969-70	Louisiana-Lafayette
	Jerome Lambert	26	1993-94	SMU
5	Jerome Lambert	25	1993-94	Houston
	Darrell Hardy	25	1965-66	Texas
	Jerry Mallett	25	1956-57	Rice
8	Joey Fatta	24	1988-89	North Texas
	William Chatmon	24	1970-71	Texas
	Norchad Omier	24	2024-25	Arlington Baptist

== Assists ==
Career
Rk	Player	Assists	Seasons
1	Nelson Haggerty	699	1991-92 1992-93 1993-94 1994-95
2	Curtis Jerrells	487	2005-06 2006-07 2007-08 2008-09
3	Pierre Jackson	478	2011-12 2012-13
4	Tweety Carter	474	2006-07 2007-08 2008-09 2009-10
5	Micheal Williams	464	1984-85 1985-86 1986-87 1987-88
6	A.J. Walton	452	2009-10 2010-11 2011-12 2012-13
7	Jared Butler	331	2018–19 2019–20 2020–21
8	Lester Medford	328	2014-15 2015-16
9	Aaron Bruce	320	2004-05 2005-06 2006-07 2007-08
10	David Wesley	316	1989-90 1990-91 1991-92

Season
Rk	Player	Assists	Season
1	Nelson Haggerty	284	1994-95
2	Pierre Jackson	255	2012-13
3	RayJ Dennis	236	2023-24
4	Pierre Jackson	223	2011-12
5	Lester Medford	222	2015-16
6	Curtis Jerrells	192	2008-09
7	Nelson Haggerty	189	1992-93
8	Tweety Carter	188	2009-10
9	James Akinjo	185	2021-22
10	Micheal Williams	182	1987-88

Single game
Rk	Player	Assists	Season	Opponent
1	Nelson Haggerty	19	1992-93	Oral Roberts
2	Nelson Haggerty	18	1993-94	Louisiana-Lafayette
	Nelson Haggerty	18	1994-95	TCU
4	Vinnie Johnson	17	1977-78	Long Beach State
5	Nelson Haggerty	16	1994-95	UMKC
	Pierre Jackson	16	2012-13	Arizona State
7	Pierre Jackson	15	2011-12	Missouri
8	Nelson Haggerty	14	1994-95	Louisiana-Lafayette
9	David Wesley	13	1991-92	North Texas
	Nelson Haggerty	13	1994-95	Northwestern
	Nelson Haggerty	13	1994-95	Texas
	Nelson Haggerty	13	1994-95	Texas Tech
	Pierre Jackson	13	2012-13	Providence
	Lester Medford	13	2015-16	Kansas State
	Lester Medford	13	2015-16	Hardin-Simmons
	Jared Butler	13	2020-21	Kansas State
	Robert Wright III	13	2024-25	Norfolk State

== Steals ==
Career
Rk	Player	Steals	Seasons
1	Micheal Williams	282	1984-85 1985-86 1986-87 1987-88
2	A.J. Walton	224	2009-10 2010-11 2011-12 2012-13
3	Curtis Jerrells	159	2005-06 2006-07 2007-08 2008-09
4	LaceDarius Dunn	158	2007-08 2008-09 2009-10 2010-11
5	Tweety Carter	153	2006-07 2007-08 2008-09 2009-10
	Terry Black	153	1999-00 2000-01
7	Henry Dugat	152	2005-06 2006-07 2007-08 2008-09
8	Wendell Greenleaf	151	1999-00 2000-01 2001-02
9	David Wesley	145	1989-90 1990-91 1991-92
10	Mark Vital	144	2017–18 2018–19 2019–20 2020–21

Season
Rk	Player	Steals	Season
1	Micheal Williams	93	1986-87
2	Micheal Williams	84	1987-88
3	Terry Black	77	1999-00
4	Terry Black	76	2000-01
5	A.J. Walton	68	2010-11
	Pierre Jackson	68	2011-12
	V. J. Edgecombe	68	2024-25
8	Tounde Yessoufou	67	2025-26
9	Wendell Greenleaf	65	2001-02
	James Akinjo	65	2021-22

Single game
Rk	Player	Steals	Season	Opponent
1	Vinnie Johnson	8	1978-79	Austin College
	Micheal Williams	8	1984-85	Prairie View A&M
	Joey Fatta	8	1990-91	Iowa State
4	Russ Oliver	7	1977-78	Rice
	Micheal Williams	7	1986-87	Tulsa
	Terry Black	7	1999-00	Creighton
	Terry Black	7	1999-00	Kansas
	Wendell Greenleaf	7	2001-02	UT Pan
	Wendell Greenleaf	7	2001-02	Missouri
	Kenny Taylor	7	2002-03	Kansas State
	Rico Gathers	7	2014-15	New Mexico State
	Lester Medford	7	2015-16	Savannah State

== Blocks ==
Career
Rk	Player	Blocks	Seasons
1	Brian Skinner	346	1994-95 1995-96 1996-97 1997-98
2	Quincy Acy	177	2008-09 2009-10 2010-11 2011-12
	Isaiah Austin	177	2012-13 2013-14
4	Cory Jefferson	166	2009-10 2011-12 2012-13 2013-14
5	Jo Lual-Acuil Jr.	151	2016-17 2017-18
6	Mamadou Diene	145	2005-06 2006-07 2007-08 2008-09
7	Ekpe Udoh	133	2009-10
8	Johnathan Motley	122	2014-15 2015-16 2016-17
9	Willie Sublett	106	1990-91 1991-92 1992-93 1993-94
10	Joey Fatta	101	1988-89 1989-90 1990-91 1991-92

Season
Rk	Player	Blocks	Season
1	Ekpe Udoh	133	2009-10
2	Isaiah Austin	119	2013-14
3	Brian Skinner	98	1997-98
4	Brian Skinner	97	1996-97
5	Jo Lual-Acuil Jr.	87	2016-17
6	Brian Skinner	82	1995-96
7	Cory Jefferson	71	2012-13
8	Quincy Acy	70	2011-12
9	Brian Skinner	69	1994-95
10	Freddie Gillespie	66	2019-20

Single game
Rk	Player	Blocks	Season	Opponent
1	Ekpe Udoh	10	2009-10	Morgan State
	Brian Skinner	10	1995-96	Louisiana Tech
	Brian Skinner	10	1997-98	Eastern Washington
4	Ekpe Udoh	9	2009-10	UT Arlington
	Ekpe Udoh	9	2009-10	Texas Tech
	Isaiah Austin	9	2013-14	Kansas State
7	John Flippen	8	1999-00	Nebraska
	Ekpe Udoh	8	2009-10	Arkansas
	Isaiah Austin	8	2013-14	Louisiana-Lafayette
10	Brian Skinner	7	1994-95	Texas A&M
	Ekpe Udoh	7	2009-10	Oklahoma
	Ekpe Udoh	7	2009-10	UMass
	Ekpe Udoh	7	2009-10	Oklahoma
	Cory Jefferson	7	2011-12	UT Arlington
	Isaiah Austin	7	2013-14	Charleston Southern
	Isaiah Austin	7	2013-14	West Virginia
	Isaiah Austin	7	2013-14	Texas
	Jo Lual-Acuil Jr.	7	2016-17	Oregon
	Jo Lual-Acuil Jr.	7	2016-17	Oklahoma
