= 2019–20 North Texas Mean Green men's basketball team =

American college basketball season

2019–20 North Texas Mean Green men's basketball
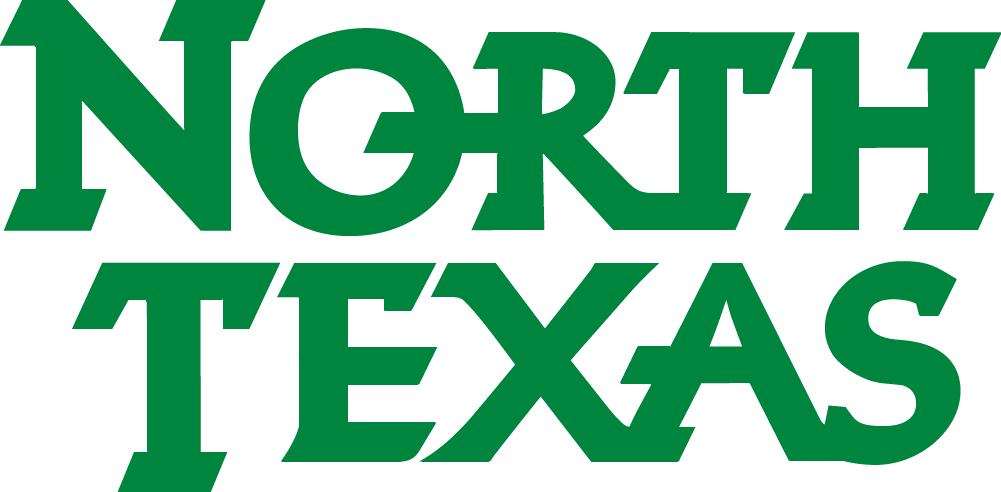

Conference USA regular-season champions
- Conference: Conference USA
- Record: 20–11 (14–4 C-USA)
- Head coach: Grant McCasland (3rd season)
- Assistant coaches: Ross Hodge; Jareem Dowling; Matt Braeuer; Nelson Haggerty
- Home arena: The Super Pit

2019–20 Conference USA men's basketball standings
	Conf.				Overall
Team	W		L	PCT	W		L	PCT
North Texas	14	–	4	.778	20	–	11	.645
Western Kentucky	13	–	5	.722	20	–	10	.667
Louisiana Tech	13	–	5	.722	22	–	8	.733
Charlotte	10	–	8	.556	16	–	13	.552
FIU	9	–	9	.500	19	–	13	.594
Marshall	10	–	8	.556	17	–	15	.531
UAB	9	–	9	.500	19	–	13	.594
Old Dominion	9	–	9	.500	13	–	19	.406
Florida Atlantic	8	–	10	.444	17	–	15	.531
UTSA	7	–	11	.389	13	–	19	.406
UTEP	8	–	10	.444	17	–	15	.531
Rice	7	–	11	.389	15	–	17	.469
Southern Miss	5	–	13	.278	9	–	22	.290
Middle Tennessee	4	–	14	.222	8	–	23	.258
Note: The 2020 C-USA tournament was canceled prior to the quarterfinals due to the COVID-19 pandemic.

The 2019–20 North Texas Mean Green men's basketball team represented the University of North Texas during the 2019–20 NCAA Division I men's basketball season. The Mean Green, led by third-year head coach Grant McCasland, played their home games at UNT Coliseum, nicknamed The Super Pit, in Denton, Texas, as members of Conference USA (C-USA). They finished the season 20–12, 14–4 in C-USA play, to finish as C-USA regular-season champions. They were set to be the No. 1 seed in the C-USA tournament. However, the C-USA tournament was canceled amid the COVID-19 pandemic.

== Previous season ==
The Mean Green finished the 2018–19 season 21–12, 8–10 in C-USA play, to finish in a tie for ninth place. They lost in the quarterfinals of the C-USA tournament to Western Kentucky. They were not invited participate in postseason play.

== Departures ==
Name	Number	Pos.	Height	Weight	Year	Hometown	Reason for departure
Ryan Woolridge	0	G	6' 3"	175	Junior	Mansfield, TX	Transferred to Gonzaga
Jorden Duffy	2	G	6' 1"	170	Junior	Salisbury, MD	Graduated
Mark Tikhonenko	13	F	6' 10"	210	RS Freshman	Moscow, Russia	Transferred to Sam Houston State
John Weger	15	G	6' 3"	260	Freshman	Muenster, TX	Walk-on; transferred to Midwestern State
Tope Arikawe	20	F	6' 8"	220	Senior	Lagos, Nigeria	Graduated
Michael Miller	23	G	6' 3"	185	Senior	Michigan City, IN	Graduated

=== Incoming transfers ===
Name	Number	Pos.	Height	Weight	Year	Hometown	Previous school
James Reese	0	G	6' 4"	169	Junior	Eastover, SC	Junior college transferred from Odessa College
Javion Hamlet	3	G	6' 4"	191	RS Junior	Memphis, TN	Junior college transferred from Northwest Florida State College
Thomas Bell	13	F	6' 6"	186	RS Junior	East St. Louis, IL	Junior college transferred from Kaskaskia College
Deng Geu	23	F	6' 8"	201	Graduate student	Sioux Falls, SD	Graduate transfer from North Dakota State

== Recruiting class of 2019 ==
College recruiting
Name	Hometown	School	Height	Weight	Commit date
Jalen Jackson; PG	San Antonio, TX	Karen Wagner High School	5 ft 10 in (1.78 m)	155 lb (70 kg)	May 7, 2018
Jalen Jackson; PG	Recruit ratings: Scout: Rivals: 247Sports: (0)				
Karston Miller; G	Buford, Georgia	Buford High School	6 ft 3 in (1.91 m)	215 lb (98 kg)	
Karston Miller; G	Recruit ratings: Scout: Rivals: (0)				
Overall recruit ranking:
Note: In many cases, Scout, Rivals, 247Sports, On3, and ESPN may conflict in their listings of height and weight.; In these cases, the average was taken. ESPN grades are on a 100-point scale.; Sources: "2019 Team Ranking". Rivals.

=== Recruiting class of 2020 ===
College recruiting (2019)
Name	Hometown	School	Height	Weight	Commit date
Rubin Jones; SG	Houston, TX	Yates High School	6 ft 4 in (1.93 m)	180 lb (82 kg)	Aug 31, 2019
Rubin Jones; SG	Recruit ratings: Scout: Rivals: 247Sports: (0)				
Overall recruit ranking:
Note: In many cases, Scout, Rivals, 247Sports, On3, and ESPN may conflict in their listings of height and weight.; In these cases, the average was taken. ESPN grades are on a 100-point scale.; Sources: "2020 Team Ranking". Rivals.

== Roster ==
2019–20 North Texas Mean Green men's basketball team
Players
Coaches

Pos.	#	Name	Height	Weight	Year	Previous school	Hometown
G	0	James Reese	6 ft 4 in (1.93 m)	169 lb (77 kg)	Jr	AC Flora HS; Odessa College	Eastover, SC
G	1	Umoja Gibson	6 ft 1 in (1.85 m)	168 lb (76 kg)	RS So	University HS	Waco, TX
G	2	Roosevelt Smart	6 ft 3 in (1.91 m)	184 lb (83 kg)	Sr	Sunrise Christian Academy; New Mexico JC	Chicago, IL
G	3	Javion Hamlet	6 ft 4 in (1.93 m)	191 lb (87 kg)	RS Jr	Whitehaven HS; Northwest Florida State College	Memphis, TN
G	4	Jalen Jackson	5 ft 11 in (1.8 m)	175 lb (79 kg)	Fr	Wagner HS	San Antonio, TX
G	5	Abdul Mohamed	6 ft 7 in (2.01 m)	190 lb (86 kg)	RS Jr	Bell HS; Gillette College	Ottawa, ON
F	10	Jahmiah Simmons	6 ft 4 in (1.93 m)	210 lb (95 kg)	RS Jr	Pace HS; Arkansas State	St. Thomas, USVI
G	11	J. J. Murray (W)	6 ft 1 in (1.85 m)	175 lb (79 kg)	RS Jr	Rowlett HS; Eastfield College	Rowlett, TX
F	13	Thomas Bell	6 ft 6 in (1.98 m)	186 lb (84 kg)	Jr	Cahokia HS; Kaskaskia College	East St. Louis, IL
G	20	Karston Miller (redshirt)	6 ft 3 in (1.91 m)	215 lb (98 kg)	Fr	Buford High School	Buford, GA
G	22	Larry Wise	6 ft 5 in (1.96 m)	194 lb (88 kg)	RS Fr	Waxahachie HS	Waxahachie, TX
F	23	Deng Geu	6 ft 8 in (2.03 m)	201 lb (91 kg)	RS Sr	Sioux Falls Washington HS; North Dakota State	Sioux Falls, SD
F	24	Zachary Simmons	6 ft 10 in (2.08 m)	235 lb (107 kg)	Jr	Cedar Hill HS	Abilene, TX
F	35	Shakeem Alcindor	6 ft 8 in (2.03 m)	228 lb (103 kg)	So	Link Year Prep	St. Croix, USVI
G	55	D. J. Draper (W)	6 ft 0 in (1.83 m)	172 lb (78 kg)	RS Sr	Birdville HS	Bedford, TX

Head coach

- Grant McCasland (Baylor)

Assistant coach(es)

- Ross Hodge (East Texas A&M)
- Jareem Dowling (Maryland Eastern Shore)
- Matt Braeuer (Wichita State)
- Nelson Haggerty (Baylor)

Legend

- (C) Team captain
- (S) Suspended
- (I) Ineligible
- (W) Walk-on
- Injured
- Current redshirt

Roster
Last update: March 8, 2025

== Schedule and results ==
Date time, TV	Rank^{#}	Opponent^{#}	Result	Record	Site (attendance) city, state
Non-conference regular season
November 5, 2019*; 7:00 p.m.		Oklahoma Christian	W 79–40	1–0	The Super Pit (2,831); Denton, TX
November 8, 2019*; 6:00 p.m., ESPN+		at No. 25 VCU	L 56–59	1–1	Siegel Center (7,637); Richmond, VA
November 12, 2019*; 7:00 p.m., SECN+		at Arkansas	L 73–78	1–2	Bud Walton Arena (12,001); Fayetteville, AR
November 16, 2019*; 3:00 p.m.		Eastern Michigan; Jamaica Classic campus game	L 51–56	1–3	The Super Pit (2,380); Denton, TX
November 19, 2019*; 7:00 p.m., CUSA.tv		North Carolina A&T	W 80–60	2–3	The Super Pit (2,129); Denton, TX
November 22, 2019*; 3:30 p.m., CBSSN		vs. Rhode Island; Jamaica Classic	L 47–60	2–4	Montego Bay Convention Centre; Montego Bay, Jamaica
November 24, 2019*; 5:30 p.m., CBSSN		vs. No. 15 Utah State; Jamaica Classic	L 59–68	2–5	Montego Bay Convention Centre; Montego Bay, Jamaica
December 2, 2019*; 7:00 p.m., ESPN+		at UT Arlington	W 77–66	3–5	College Park Center (1,764); Arlington, TX
December 5, 2019*; 7:00 p.m., CBSSN		Oklahoma	L 80–82	3–6	The Super Pit (5,637); Denton, TX
December 7, 2019*; 5:00 p.m., CUSA.tv		Little Rock	W 76–53	4–6	The Super Pit (2,136); Denton, TX
December 17, 2019*; 6:00 p.m., ESPN+		at No. 13 Dayton	L 58–71	4–7	UD Arena (13,129); Dayton, OH
December 21, 2019*; 5:00 p.m., CUSA.TV		Arkansas–Pine Bluff	W 86–53	5–7	The Super Pit (2,057); Denton, TX
December 28, 2019*; 5:00 p.m., CUSA.TV		Texas Wesleyan	W 102–64	6–7	The Super Pit (2,035); Denton, TX
Conference USA regular season
January 2, 2020; 2:00 p.m., ESPNU		at Western Kentucky	L 84–93	6–8 (0–1)	E. A. Diddle Arena (3,716); Bowling Green, KY
January 4, 2020; 1:00 p.m., ESPN+		Marshall	W 67–64	7–8 (1–1)	Cam Henderson Center (5,489); Huntington, WV
January 9, 2020; 7:00 p.m., ESPN+		FIU	W 74–56	8–8 (2–1)	The Super Pit (2,262); Denton, TX
January 11, 2020; 3:00 p.m., ESPN+		Florida Atlantic	W 81–58	9–8 (3–1)	The Super Pit (2,035); Denton, TX
January 16, 2020; 7:00 p.m., ESPN+		at Southern Miss	W 72–52	10–8 (4–1)	Reed Green Coliseum; Hattiesburg, MS
January 18, 2020; 4:00 p.m., ESPN+		at Louisiana Tech	W 51–50	11–8 (5–1)	Thomas Assembly Center (3,213); Ruston, LA
January 20, 2020; 7:00 p.m., ESPN+		Rice	W 79–59	12–8 (6–1)	The Super Pit (2,729); Denton, TX
January 23, 2020; 7:00 p.m., Stadium		UTSA	W 98–78	13–8 (7–1)	The Super Pit (3,186); Denton, TX
January 25, 2020; 5:00 p.m., ESPN+		UTEP	W 67–57	14–8 (8–1)	The Super Pit (4,092); Denton, TX
February 1, 2020; 2:00 p.m., ESPN+		at Rice	L 75–84	14–9 (8–2)	Tudor Fieldhouse (2,580); Houston, TX
February 6, 2020; 6:30 p.m., ESPN+		at Middle Tennessee	W 75–70	15–9 (9–2)	Murphy Center (3,209); Murfreesboro, TN
February 8, 2020; 1:00 p.m., ESPN+		at UAB	W 71–64	16–9 (10–2)	Bartow Arena (2,925); Birmingham, AL
February 13, 2020; 7:00 p.m., CUSA.TV		Charlotte	W 81–72	17–9 (11–2)	The Super Pit (4,086); Denton, TX
February 15, 2020; 1:00 p.m., ESPNU		Old Dominion	W 64–47	18–9 (12–2)	The Super Pit (5,282); Denton, TX
February 22, 2020; 1:00 p.m., Stadium		Louisiana Tech	L 71–73	18–10 (12–3)	The Super Pit (4,277); Denton, TX
February 27, 2020; 7:00 p.m., Stadium		at FIU	W 78–59	19–10 (13–3)	Ocean Bank Convocation Center (644); Miami, FL
March 1, 2020; 1:00 p.m., CBSSN		Western Kentucky	W 78–72 ^{OT}	20–10 (14–3)	The Super Pit (4,471); Denton, TX
March 4, 2020; 7:00 p.m., CBSSN		at Charlotte	L 43–56	20–11 (14–4)	Dale F. Halton Arena (2,811); Charlotte, NC
Conference USA tournament
March 12, 2020; 6:00 p.m., Stadium	(1)	vs. (9) Florida Atlantic; Quarterfinals	C-USA tournament canceled		Ford Center at The Star; Frisco, TX
*Non-conference game. ^{#}Rankings from AP poll. (#) Tournament seedings in parentheses. All times are in Central.

== See also ==
- 2019–20 North Texas Mean Green women's basketball team
