= 2019–20 Rice Owls men's basketball team =

American college basketball season

2019–20 Rice Owls men's basketball
- Conference: Conference USA
- Record: 15–17 (7–11 C-USA)
- Head coach: Scott Pera (3rd season)
- Assistant coaches: Vince Alexander; Mark Linebaugh; Van Green
- Home arena: Tudor Fieldhouse

2019–20 Conference USA men's basketball standings
	Conf.				Overall
Team	W		L	PCT	W		L	PCT
North Texas	14	–	4	.778	20	–	11	.645
Western Kentucky	13	–	5	.722	20	–	10	.667
Louisiana Tech	13	–	5	.722	22	–	8	.733
Charlotte	10	–	8	.556	16	–	13	.552
FIU	9	–	9	.500	19	–	13	.594
Marshall	10	–	8	.556	17	–	15	.531
UAB	9	–	9	.500	19	–	13	.594
Old Dominion	9	–	9	.500	13	–	19	.406
Florida Atlantic	8	–	10	.444	17	–	15	.531
UTSA	7	–	11	.389	13	–	19	.406
UTEP	8	–	10	.444	17	–	15	.531
Rice	7	–	11	.389	15	–	17	.469
Southern Miss	5	–	13	.278	9	–	22	.290
Middle Tennessee	4	–	14	.222	8	–	23	.258
Note: The 2020 C-USA tournament was canceled prior to the quarterfinals due to the COVID-19 pandemic.

The 2019–20 Rice Owls men's basketball team represented Rice University in the 2019–20 NCAA Division I men's basketball season. The Owls, led by third-year head coach Scott Pera, played their home games at Tudor Fieldhouse in Houston, Texas as members of Conference USA. They finished the season 15–17, 7–11 in C-USA play to finish in 12th place. They lost in the first round of the C-USA tournament to FIU.

== Previous season ==
The Owls finished the 2018–19 season 13–19 overall, 8–10 in C-USA play to finish in four-way tie for 9th place. In the C-USA tournament, they were defeated by Marshall in the first round.

== Offseason ==
=== Departures ===
Name	Number	Pos.	Height	Weight	Year	Hometown	Reason for departure
Dylan Jones	4	F	6'8"	215	RS Senior	Houston, TX	Graduated
Oliver Xu	30	G	6'2"	170	RS Senior	Hong Kong	Walk-on; graduated
Jack Williams	32	F	6'8"	220	RS Senior	Porter Ranch, CA	Graduated
Quentin Millora-Brown	42	F	6'9"	205	Freshman	Lorton, VA	Transferred to Vanderbilt

=== Incoming transfers ===
Name	Number	Pos.	Height	Weight	Year	Hometown	Previous School
Tommy McCarthy	13	G	6'0"	175	GS Senior	Ranch Santa Fe, CA	Transferred from Harvard. Will be eligible to play immediately since McCarthy graduated from Harvard.
Malik Ondigo		F	6'10"	215	Junior	St. Louis, MO	Transferred from Texas Tech. Under NCAA transfer rules, Ondigo will have to sit out the 2019–20 season. Will have two years of remaining eligibility.

=== 2019 recruiting class ===
College recruiting information
Name	Hometown	School	Height	Weight	Commit date
Max Fiedler; C	Melbourne, FL	Melbourne High School	6 ft 10 in (2.08 m)	230 lb (100 kg)	Sep 16, 2018
Max Fiedler; C	Recruit ratings: Scout: Rivals: 247Sports: (NR)				
Zach Crisler; PF	Glenside, PA	La Salle College High School	6 ft 9 in (2.06 m)	210 lb (95 kg)	Sep 14, 2018
Zach Crisler; PF	Recruit ratings: Scout: Rivals: 247Sports: (NR)				
Quincy Olivari; PG	Atlanta, GA	Westlake High School	6 ft 0 in (1.83 m)	165 lb (75 kg)	Sep 17, 2018
Quincy Olivari; PG	Recruit ratings: Scout: Rivals: 247Sports: (NR)				
Overall recruit ranking:
Note: In many cases, Scout, Rivals, 247Sports, On3, and ESPN may conflict in their listings of height and weight.; In these cases, the average was taken. ESPN grades are on a 100-point scale.; Sources: "2019 Team Ranking". Rivals.

=== 2020 recruiting class ===
College recruiting information (2020)
Name	Hometown	School	Height	Weight	Commit date
Mylyjael Poteat; C	Reidsville, NC	The Burlington School	6 ft 9 in (2.06 m)	260 lb (120 kg)	Jan 13, 2020
Mylyjael Poteat; C	Recruit ratings: Scout: Rivals: 247Sports: (0)				
Cameron Sheffield; SF	Alpharetta, GA	Chattahoochee High School	6 ft 5 in (1.96 m)	165 lb (75 kg)	Sep 27, 2018
Cameron Sheffield; SF	Recruit ratings: Scout: Rivals: 247Sports: (0)				
Overall recruit ranking:
Note: In many cases, Scout, Rivals, 247Sports, On3, and ESPN may conflict in their listings of height and weight.; In these cases, the average was taken. ESPN grades are on a 100-point scale.; Sources: "2020 Team Ranking". Rivals.

== Roster ==
2019–20 Rice Owls men's basketball team
Players
Coaches

Pos.	#	Name	Height	Weight	Year	Previous school	Hometown
G	0	Payton Moore	6 ft 4 in (1.93 m)	205 lb (93 kg)	So	Santa Monica High School	Los Angeles, California
G	1	Josh Parrish	6 ft 4 in (1.93 m)	215 lb (98 kg)	RS Jr	Seguin High School; TCU	Arlington, Texas
G	2	Trey Murphy III	6 ft 8 in (2.03 m)	200 lb (91 kg)	So	Cary Academy	Durham, North Carolina
G	3	Ako Adams	6 ft 3 in (1.91 m)	175 lb (79 kg)	Sr	Bishop O'Connell High School	Washington, D.C.
G	4	Quincy Olivari	6 ft 2 in (1.88 m)	190 lb (86 kg)	Fr	Westlake High School	Atlanta, Georgia
G	5	Addison Owen (W)	6 ft 5 in (1.96 m)	195 lb (88 kg)	Sr	The Paideia School	Atlanta, Georgia
F	10	Robert Martin	6 ft 6 in (1.98 m)	220 lb (100 kg)	Sr	Tilton School	Pittsburgh, Pennsylvania
F	12	Ben Moffat (W)	6 ft 8 in (2.03 m)	225 lb (102 kg)	Fr	Rider High School	Wichita Falls, Texas
G	13	Tommy McCarthy	6 ft 1 in (1.85 m)	175 lb (79 kg)	GS	La Costa Canyon High School; Harvard	Rancho Santa Fe, California
G	14	Reed Myers (W)	6 ft 0 in (1.83 m)	180 lb (82 kg)	Fr	Scottsdale Christian Academy	Phoenix, Arizona
F	15	Max Fiedler	6 ft 10 in (2.08 m)	235 lb (107 kg)	Fr	Melbourne High School	Indialantic, Florida
F	20	Zach Crisler	6 ft 9 in (2.06 m)	215 lb (98 kg)	Fr	La Salle High School	North Wales, Pennsylvania
G/F	23	Drew Peterson	6 ft 8 in (2.03 m)	185 lb (84 kg)	So	Libertyville High School	Libertyville, Illinois
G	24	Chris Mullins	6 ft 3 in (1.91 m)	190 lb (86 kg)	So	Mansfield Timberview High School	Grand Prairie, Texas
F	35	Tim Harrison	6 ft 8 in (2.03 m)	220 lb (100 kg)	Sr	Francis Parker School	San Diego, California
F		Malik Ondigo (redshirt)	6 ft 10 in (2.08 m)	215 lb (98 kg)	Jr	Putnam Science Academy; Texas Tech	El Mirage, Arizona

Head coach

- Scott Pera (Penn State)

Assistant coach(es)

- Vince Alexander (Oklahoma Baptist)
- Mark Linebaugh (Colgate)
- Van Green (Rice)

Legend

- (C) Team captain
- (S) Suspended
- (I) Ineligible
- (W) Walk-on
- Injured
- Current redshirt

Roster
Last update: January 18, 2020

== Schedule and results ==
Date time, TV	Rank^{#}	Opponent^{#}	Result	Record	Site (attendance) city, state
Exhibition
October 31, 2019*; 7:00 pm		St. Edward's	L 83–89		Tudor Fieldhouse; Houston, TX
Non-conference regular season
November 5, 2019*; 7:00 pm, SECN+		at Arkansas	L 43–91	0–1	Bud Walton Arena (17,274); Fayetteville, AR
November 9, 2019*; 3:30 pm, CUSA.tv		Penn	W 80–61	1–1	Tudor Fieldhouse (1,557); Houston, TX
November 10, 2019*; 4:00 pm, CUSA.tv		Wayland Baptist	W 65–40	2–1	Tudor Fieldhouse (1,222); Houston, TX
November 12, 2019*; 6:30 pm, DemonTV		at Northwestern State	W 80–74	3–1	Prather Coliseum (1,606); Natchitoches, LA
November 16, 2019*; 4:00 pm, BigWest.tv		at UC Santa Barbara	W 82–81	4–1	The Thunderdome (1,503); Santa Barbara, CA
November 19, 2019*; 7:00 pm, Facebook		Houston; Rivalry	L 89–97	4–2	Tudor Fieldhouse (2,513); Houston, TX
November 22, 2019*; 1:00 pm, FloHoops		vs. Milwaukee; Islands of the Bahamas Showcase First Round	W 75–69	5–2	Baha Mar Convention Center (300); Nassau, Bahamas
November 23, 2019*; 4:00 pm, FloHoops		vs. Liberty; Islands of the Bahamas Showcase Semifinals	L 59–71	5–3	Baha Mar Convention Center (300); Nassau, Bahamas
November 24, 2019*; 4:00 pm, FloHoops		vs. East Carolina; Islands of the Bahamas Showcase 3rd Place Game	W 77–69	6–3	Baha Mar Convention Center (300); Nassau, Bahamas
December 7, 2019*; 2:00 pm, ESPN+		at Lamar	L 60–73	6–4	Montagne Center (1,807); Beaumont, TX
December 14, 2019*; 7:00 pm, CUSA.tv		Houston Baptist	W 96–84	7–4	Tudor Fieldhouse (1,725); Houston, TX
December 19, 2019*; 11:15 am, CUSA.tv		St. Thomas (TX)	W 103–70	8–4	Tudor Fieldhouse (4,325); Houston, TX
December 29, 2019*; 2:00 pm, CUSA.tv		Sam Houston State	L 61–75	8–5	Tudor Fieldhouse (1,763); Houston, TX
Conference USA regular season
January 2, 2020; 6:00 pm, ESPN+		at Marshall	L 69–89	8–6 (0–1)	Cam Henderson Center (5,311); Huntington, WV
January 4, 2020; 4:00 pm, ESPN3		at Western Kentucky	L 61–68	8–7 (0–2)	E. A. Diddle Arena (4,619); Bowling Green, KY
January 9, 2020; 7:00 pm, ESPN+		Florida Atlantic	L 76–81	8–8 (0–3)	Tudor Fieldhouse (1,170); Houston, TX
January 11, 2020; 2:00 pm, ESPN+		FIU	W 92–78	9–8 (1–3)	Tudor Fieldhouse (1,490); Houston, TX
January 16, 2020; 6:30 pm, ESPN+		at Louisiana Tech	L 56–72	9–9 (1–4)	Thomas Assembly Center (2,467); Ruston, LA
January 18, 2020; 2:00 pm, ESPN+		at Southern Miss	L 68–81	9–10 (1–5)	Reed Green Coliseum (3,571); Hattiesburg, MS
January 20, 2020; 7:00 pm, ESPN+		at North Texas	L 59–79	9–11 (1–6)	The Super Pit (2,729); Denton, TX
January 23, 2020; 7:00 pm, ESPN+		UTEP	L 64–72	9–12 (1–7)	Tudor Fieldhouse (1,518); Houston, TX
January 25, 2020; 7:00 pm, ESPN+		UTSA	L 88–90	9–13 (1–8)	Tudor Fieldhouse (2,239); Houston, TX
February 1, 2020; 2:00 pm, ESPN+		North Texas	W 84–75	10–13 (2–8)	Tudor Fieldhouse (2,580); Houston, TX
February 6, 2020; 7:00 pm, ESPN+		at UAB	W 86–72	11–13 (3–8)	Bartow Arena (3,032); Birmingham, AL
February 8, 2020; 5:00 pm, CUSA.tv		at Middle Tennessee	W 91–83	12–13 (4–8)	Murphy Center (3,912); Murfreesboro, TN
February 13, 2020; 7:00 pm, ESPN+		Old Dominion	L 70–73	12–14 (4–9)	Tudor Fieldhouse (1,387); Houston, TX
February 15, 2020; 2:00 pm, ESPN+		Charlotte	W 70–54	13–14 (5–9)	Tudor Fieldhouse (2,872); Houston, TX
February 22, 2020; 6:00 pm, CUSA.tv		at UTEP	L 62–68	13–15 (5–10)	Don Haskins Center (4,139); El Paso, TX
March 1, 2020; 2:00 pm, CUSA.tv		Middle Tennessee	W 77–66	14–15 (6–10)	Tudor Fieldhouse (1,677); Houston, TX
March 4, 2020; 7:00 pm, ESPN3		at Southern Miss	W 72–57	15–15 (7–10)	Reed Green Coliseum (3,065); Hattiesburg, MS
March 7, 2020; 5:00 pm, CUSA.tv		UTEP	L 72-77	15-16 (7-11)	Tudor Fieldhouse (1,608); Houston, TX
Conference USA tournament
March 11, 2020; 6:30 pm, ESPN+	(12)	vs. (5) FIU; First round	L 76–85	15–17	Ford Center at The Star; Frisco, TX
*Non-conference game. ^{#}Rankings from AP Poll. (#) Tournament seedings in parentheses. All times are in Central.
