= 1977–78 Arkansas Razorbacks men's basketball team =

American college basketball season

1977–78 Arkansas Razorbacks men's basketball

NCAA Tournament Third-Place Game winner NCAA Tournament West Region champions Southwest Conference champions

NCAA tournament, Final Four
- Conference: Southwest Conference

Ranking
- Coaches: No. 6
- AP: No. 5
- Record: 32–4 (14–2 SWC)
- Head coach: Eddie Sutton (4th season)
- Home arena: Barnhill Arena

1977–78 Southwest Conference men's basketball standings
| | Conf. | | | | Overall |
| Team | W | | L | PCT | W | | L | PCT |
|---|---|---|---|---|---|---|---|---|
| No. 5 Arkansas | 14 | – | 2 | .875 | 32 | – | 4 | .889 |
| No. 17 Texas | 14 | – | 2 | .875 | 26 | – | 5 | .839 |
| Houston † | 11 | – | 5 | .688 | 25 | – | 8 | .758 |
| Texas Tech | 10 | – | 6 | .625 | 19 | – | 10 | .655 |
| Baylor | 8 | – | 8 | .500 | 14 | – | 13 | .519 |
| SMU | 6 | – | 10 | .375 | 10 | – | 18 | .357 |
| Texas A&M | 5 | – | 11 | .313 | 12 | – | 15 | .444 |
| Rice | 2 | – | 14 | .125 | 4 | – | 22 | .154 |
| TCU | 2 | – | 14 | .125 | 4 | – | 22 | .154 |
† 1978 SWC tournament winner Rankings from AP Poll

The 1977–78 Arkansas Razorbacks men's basketball team represented the University of Arkansas. The head coach was Eddie Sutton. He coached the Razorbacks from the 1974–75 season until the 1984–85 season. During his tenure as head coach, the Razorbacks ended the season either first or tied for first in the Southwest Conference five times. Under Sutton, the Razorbacks were invited to the NCAA tournament nine times. Sutton's most successful season was 1977–78 when the team reached the Final Four. The Razorbacks lost in the semifinals to the Kentucky Wildcats 64–59 at the Checkerdome arena in St. Louis, Missouri. Arkansas defeated Notre Dame 71–69 in the Third-Place game.

== Roster ==
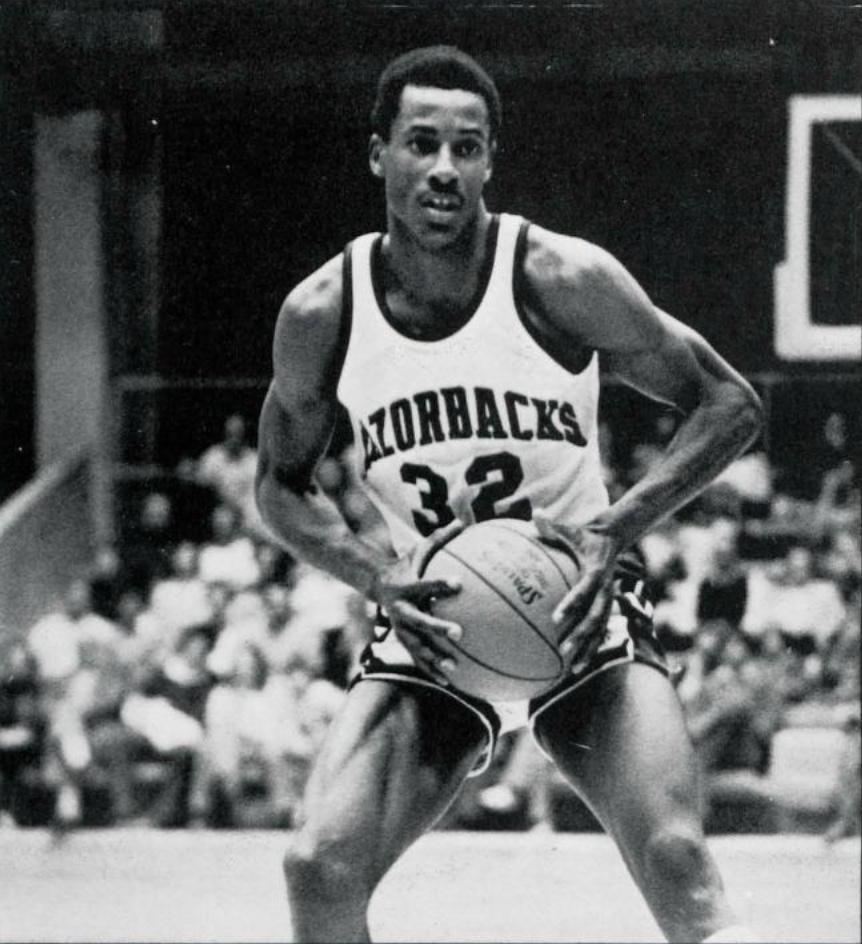
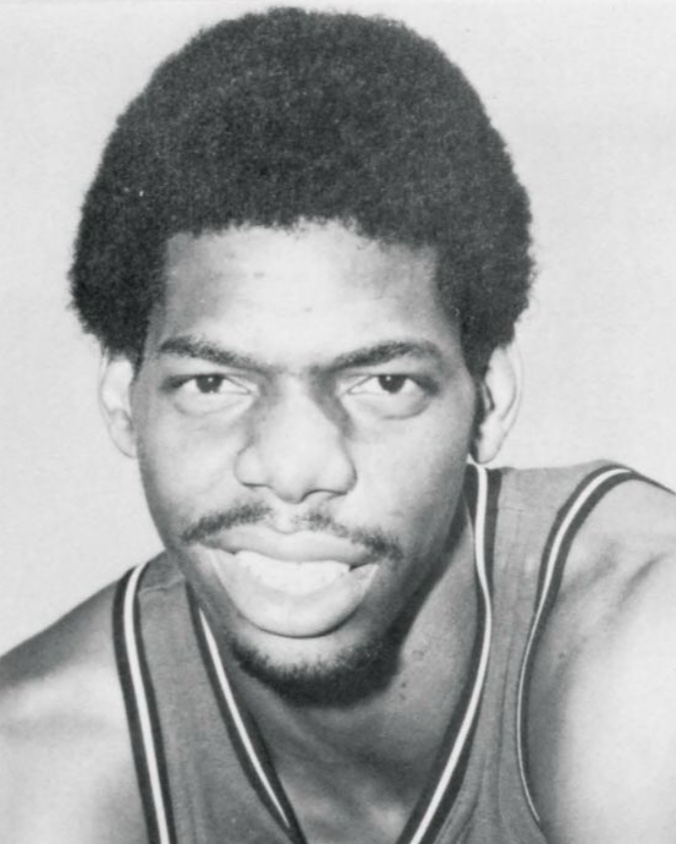
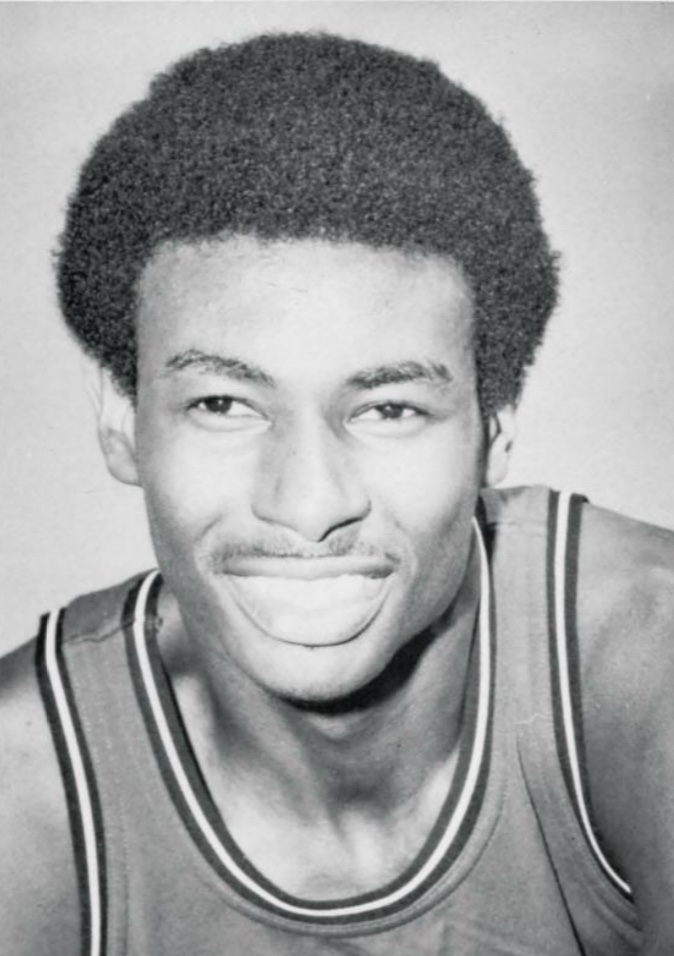
Junior Sidney Moncrief and seniors Ron Brewer and Marvin Delph were the “triplets” who led the Razorbacks to the Final Four.

1977-78 Razorbacks' Roster
| POS | Height | Weight | # | Name | Class | Previous School | Hometown |
|---|---|---|---|---|---|---|---|
| G | 6-4 | 180 | 10 | Ron Brewer | Sr | Northside | Fort Smith, AR |
| G | 6-4 | 190 | 32 | Sidney Moncrief | Jr | Hall | Little Rock, AR |
| G | 6-4 | 180 | 44 | Marvin Delph | Sr | Conway | Conway, AR |
| C | 6-10 | 220 | 30 | Steve Schall | Jr | South | Raytown, MO |
| F | 6-7 | 196 | 42 | Jim Counce | Sr | White Station | Memphis, TN |
| G | 6-2 | 175 | 24 | U.S Reed | Fr | Pine Bluff | Pine Bluff, AR |
| C | 6-9 | 220 | 50 | James Crocket | Fr | West Helena | West Helena, AR |
| G | 6-4 | 180 | 11 | Michael Watley | Fr | Dunbar | Fort Worth, TX |
| C | 6-10 | | | Steve Bates | Fr | Wayne | Fort Wayne, IN |
| G | 6-5 | 190 | 14 | Chris Bennett | So | Little Rock Catholic | Little Rock, AR |
| F | 6-7 | 200 | 20 | Alan Zahn | So | Manzano | Albuquerque, NM |
| G | 6-4 | 185 | 34 | Mike Young | Fr | Central Noble | Wolflake, IN |

== Schedule and results ==
| Date time, TV | Rank^{#} | Opponent^{#} | Result | Record | Site (attendance) city, state |
Regular season
| November 26, 1977* | No. 7 | Southwest Missouri State | W 65–47 | 1-0 | Barnhill Arena; Fayetteville, Arkansas |
| November 28, 1977* | No. 7 | Mississippi State | W 94-61 | 2-0 | Barton Coliseum; Little Rock, Arkansas |
| December 1, 1977* | No. 7 | at Hawaii | W 79-60 | 3-0 | Neal S. Blaisdell Center; Honolulu, Hawaii |
| December 2, 1977* | No. 7 | at Hawaii | W 78-53 | 4-0 | Neal S. Blaisdell Center; Honolulu, Hawaii |
| December 8, 1977* | No. 6 | Rockhurst | W 99-63 | 5-0 | Barnhill Arena; Fayetteville, Arkansas |
| December 10, 1977* | No. 6 | at Oklahoma | W 64–53 | 6-0 | Lloyd Noble Center; Norman, Oklahoma |
| December 19, 1977* | No. 4 | Hardin–Simmons | W 86-55 | 7-0 | Barnhill Arena; Fayetteville, Arkansas |
| December 22, 1977* | No. 4 | No. 16 Kansas | W 78-72 | 8-0 | Barton Coliseum (7,284); Little Rock, Arkansas |
| December 29, 1977* | No. 3 | at LSU | W 67-62 | 9-0 | Maravich Assembly Center; Baton Rouge, Louisiana |
| December 31, 1977*; KATV | No. 3 | at Memphis State | W 95-70 | 10-0 | Mid-South Coliseum; Memphis, Tennessee |
| January 4, 1978* | No. 3 | Hofstra | W 95-70 | 11-0 | Convention Center; Pine Bluff, Arkansas |
| January 8, 1978 | No. 3 | Houston | W 84-65 | 12-0 | Barnhill Arena; Fayetteville, Arkansas |
| January 9, 1978* | No. 3 | Missouri–St. Louis | W 87-65 | 13-0 | Barnhill Arena; Fayetteville, Arkansas |
| January 12, 1978 | No. 3 | at Rice | W 69-60 | 14-0 | Tudor Fieldhouse; Houston, Texas |
| January 14, 1978 | No. 3 | at Texas | L 69-75 | 14-1 | Frank Erwin Center; Austin, Texas |
| January 17, 1978 | No. 6 | Texas A&M | W 84-68 | 15-1 | Barnhill Arena; Fayetteville, Arkansas |
| January 21, 1978 | No. 6 | TCU | W 43-35 | 16-1 | Barton Coliseum; Little Rock, Arkansas |
| January 23, 1978 | No. 6 | at Baylor | W 56-55 | 17-1 | Heart O' Texas Coliseum; Waco, Texas |
| January 25, 1978 | No. 4 | SMU | W 72-65 | 18-1 | Barnhill Arena; Fayetteville, Arkansas |
| January 28, 1978 | No. 4 | at Texas Tech | W 54-49 | 19-1 | Lubbock Municipal Coliseum; Lubbock, Texas |
| February 1, 1978 | No. 2 | No. 12 Texas | W 75-71 | 20-1 | Barnhill Arena; Fayetteville, Arkansas |
| February 4, 1978 | No. 2 | Rice | W 69-48 | 21-1 | Barnhill Arena; Fayetteville, Arkansas |
| February 7, 1978 | No. 2 | at Texas A&M | W 80-79 | 22-1 | G. Rollie White Coliseum; College Station, Texas |
| February 11, 1978 | No. 2 | at TCU | W 77-57 | 23-1 | Daniel–Meyer Coliseum; Fort Worth, Texas |
| February 13, 1978 | No. 1 | Baylor | W 82-56 | 24-1 | Barnhill Arena; Fayetteville, Arkansas |
| February 16, 1978 | No. 1 | at SMU | W 86-75 | 25-1 | Moody Coliseum; University Park, Texas |
| February 18, 1978 | No. 1 | at Houston | L 75-84 | 25-2 | Hofheinz Pavilion; Houston, Texas |
| February 21, 1978 | No. 4 | Texas Tech | W 58-49 | 26-2 | Barnhill Arena; Fayetteville, Arkansas |
SWC tournament
| February 25, 1978* | (2) No. 4 | (9) TCU; First round | W 84-42 | 27-2 | Barnhill Arena; Fayetteville, Arkansas |
| March 2, 1978* | (2) No. 4 | vs. (6) SMU; Quarterfinals | W 94-73 | 28-2 | The Summit; Houston, Texas |
| March 4, 1978* | (2) No. 4 | vs. (3) Houston; Semifinals | L 69-70 | 28-3 | The Summit; Houston, Texas |
NCAA tournament
| March 11, 1978*; 1:10 p.m. | (W 2L) No. 5 | vs. (W 4Q) Weber State; First Round | W 73-52 | 29-3 | McArthur Court (9,141); Eugene, Oregon |
| March 16, 1978* | (W 2L) No. 5 | vs. (W 1Q) No. 2 UCLA; West Regional Semifinal – Sweet Sixteen | W 74-70 | 30-3 | University Arena (17,750); Albuquerque, New Mexico |
| March 18, 1978* | (W 2L) No. 5 | vs. (W 4L) Cal State Fullerton; West Regional Final – Elite Eight | W 61-58 | 31-3 | University Arena (18,144); Albuquerque, New Mexico |
| March 25, 1978* | (W 2L) No. 5 | vs. (ME 2Q) No. 1 Kentucky; National semifinal – Final Four | L 59-64 | 31-4 | Checkerdome; St. Louis, Missouri |
| March 27, 1978* | (W 2L) No. 5 | vs. (MW 2L) No. 6 Notre Dame; National consolation – Third-place game | W 71-69 | 32-4 | Checkerdome; St. Louis, Missouri |
*Non-conference game. ^{#}Rankings from AP Poll. (#) Tournament seedings in parentheses. W=West.

== Achievements ==
Sutton left as head coach after the 1984–85 season with a Conference record of 139-35 (79.9%). He would go on to coach three more schools (Kentucky, Oklahoma State, and San Francisco) and retire in 2008. He was inducted into the College Basketball Hall of Fame in 2011.

Ron Brewer was the Southwest Conference Men's Basketball Player of the Year. He became the 7th overall pick by the Portland Trail Blazers in the 1978 NBA draft.

Sidney Moncrief was drafted the following year by the Milwaukee Bucks 5th overall in the 1979 NBA draft, and became a five time NBA All-Star and was awarded a spot on the All-NBA First Team in 1983. His jersey was retired by the Bucks.

Marvin Delph was drafted the same year as Brewer but in the 3rd round (65th overall) by the Buffalo Braves and then drafted again the next year by the Boston Celtics in the 6th round of the 1979 NBA draft along with Moncrief but never played in the NBA.

U. S. Reed was drafted in the 5th round (104th overall pick) in the 1981 NBA draft by the Kansas City Kings, but never played in the NBA.
