= 1978 Southwest Conference men's basketball tournament =

- Classification: Division I
- Season: 1977–78
- Teams: 9
- Site: The Summit; Houston, Texas
- Champions: Houston (1st title)
- Winning coach: Guy Lewis (1st title)
- MVP: Mike Schultz (Houston)

1977–78 Southwest Conference men's basketball standings
	Conf.				Overall
Team	W		L	PCT	W		L	PCT
No. 5 Arkansas	14	–	2	.875	32	–	4	.889
No. 17 Texas	14	–	2	.875	26	–	5	.839
Houston †	11	–	5	.688	25	–	8	.758
Texas Tech	10	–	6	.625	19	–	10	.655
Baylor	8	–	8	.500	14	–	13	.519
SMU	6	–	10	.375	10	–	18	.357
Texas A&M	5	–	11	.313	12	–	15	.444
Rice	2	–	14	.125	4	–	22	.154
TCU	2	–	14	.125	4	–	22	.154
† 1978 SWC tournament winner Rankings from AP Poll

The 1978 Southwest Conference men's basketball tournament was held March 2–4, 1978, at The Summit in Houston, Texas. The first round took place on February 25 at the higher-seeded campus sites.

Number 3 seed Houston defeated 1 seed Texas 92–90 to win their 1st championship and receive the conference's automatic bid to the 1978 NCAA tournament.

== Format and seeding ==
The tournament consisted of 9 teams, seeds 2-8 played in an 8 team single-elimination tournament with the winner playing the top seeded team in the tournament final.

Place	Seed	Team	Conference			Overall		
Place	Seed	Team	W	L	%	W	L	%
1	1	Texas	14	2	.875	26	5	.839
1	2	Arkansas	14	2	.875	32	4	.889
3	3	Houston	11	5	.688	25	8	.758
4	4	Texas Tech	10	6	.625	19	10	.655
5	5	Baylor	8	8	.500	14	13	.519
6	6	SMU	6	10	.375	10	18	.357
7	7	Texas A&M	5	11	.313	12	15	.444
8	8	Rice	2	14	.125	4	22	.154
8	9	TCU	2	14	.125	4	22	.154

== Tournament ==
First round Saturday, February 25
2	#4 Arkansas	84
9	TCU	42
5	Baylor	68
6	SMU	73
4	Texas Tech	85
7	Texas A&M	78
3	Houston	108
8	Rice	67

Quarterfinals; Thursday, March 2
2	#4 Arkansas	94
6	SMU	73
4	Texas Tech	82
3	Houston	93

Semifinals; Friday, March 3
2	#4 Arkansas	69
3	Houston	70

=== Final ===
Finals; Saturday, March 4
1	#12 Texas	90
3	Houston	92
