= 1977–78 Texas Longhorns men's basketball team =

American college basketball season

1977–78 Texas Longhorns men's basketball

SWC Regular Season Co-Champions

National Invitation Tournament, Champions
- Conference: Southwest Conference

Ranking
- Coaches: No. 19
- AP: No. 17
- Record: 26–5 (14–2 SWC)
- Head coach: Abe Lemons (2nd season)
- Assistant coaches: Barry Dowd; Steve Moeller
- Home arena: Special Events Center

1977–78 Southwest Conference men's basketball standings
	Conf.				Overall
Team	W		L	PCT	W		L	PCT
No. 5 Arkansas	14	–	2	.875	32	–	4	.889
No. 17 Texas	14	–	2	.875	26	–	5	.839
Houston †	11	–	5	.688	25	–	8	.758
Texas Tech	10	–	6	.625	19	–	10	.655
Baylor	8	–	8	.500	14	–	13	.519
SMU	6	–	10	.375	10	–	18	.357
Texas A&M	5	–	11	.313	12	–	15	.444
Rice	2	–	14	.125	4	–	22	.154
TCU	2	–	14	.125	4	–	22	.154
† 1978 SWC tournament winner Rankings from AP Poll

The 1977–78 Texas Longhorns men's basketball team represented the University of Texas at Austin in the 1977–78 NCAA Division I men's basketball season as a member of the Southwest Conference. They finished the season 26-5 overall, tied for the SWC regular season title with a 14–2 record and won the 1978 National Invitation Tournament. They were coached by Abe Lemons in his second season as head coach of the Longhorns. They played their home games at the Special Events Center in Austin, Texas.

== Roster ==
Name	#	Position	Height	Weight	Year	Home Town	High School
Ron Baxter	12	Guard-Forward	6–4	205	Sophomore	Los Angeles	Dorsey
Brent Boyd	4	Guard	6–3	185	Sophomore	Baton Rouge, Louisiana	Catholic University
Tyrone Branyan	31	Forward	6–7	220	Junior	Placentia, California	El Dorado
Rob Cunningham	35	Forward-Center	6–8	215	Freshman	Westport, Connecticut	Staples
John Danks	32	Forward	6–6	190	Sophomore	Beaver Dam, Kentucky	Ohio County
Ovie Dotson	15	Guard	6–5	200	Junior	San Antonio, Texas	Sam Houston
Gary Goodner	42	Forward	6–7	220	Senior	Denton, Texas	Denton
Henry Johnson	33	Forward	6–6	190	Freshman	Los Angeles	Manual Arts
Jim Krivacs	11	Guard	6–1	160	Junior	Indianapolis	Southport
John Moore	00	Guard	6–1	170	Junior	Altoona, Pennsylvania	Altoona
Mike Murphy	41	Forward	6–8	215	Senior	Austin, Texas	Crockett
Tom Nichols	55	Center	6–10	230	Senior	Houston, Texas	Sharpstown
Dave Shepard	44	Guard	6–4	205	Freshman	Los Angeles	Manual Arts
Keith Stephens	52	Forward	6–8	210	Freshman	Pasadena, California	Pasadena
Phillip Stroud	30	Forward	6–7	220	Junior	Houston, Texas	Wheatley

== Schedule ==
Date time, TV	Rank^{#}	Opponent^{#}	Result	Record	Site city, state
Regular season
November 26, 1977*		at USC	L 64–65	0–1	Los Angeles Memorial Sports Arena; Los Angeles, CA
November 29, 1977*		Oklahoma	W 83–76	1–1	Special Events Center; Austin, TX
December 3, 1977*		Mississippi State	W 81–69	2–1	Special Events Center; Austin, TX
December 5, 1977*		LSU	W 82–66	3–1	Special Events Center; Austin, TX
December 7, 1977*		at Oklahoma State	W 108–87	4–1	Gallagher Hall; Stillwater, OK
December 10, 1977*		Alaska Anchorage	W 87–65	5–1	Special Events Center; Austin, Texas
December 17, 1977*		at Centenary	W 87–65	6–1	Gold Dome; Shreveport, LA
December 20, 1977*		Oklahoma City	W 88–71	7–1	Special Events Center; Austin, Texas
December 26, 1977*		vs. Army; Milwaukee Classic	W 74–73	8–1	MECCA Arena; Milwaukee, WI
December 27, 1977*		at No. 5 Marquette; Milwaukee Classic	L 56–65	8–2	MECCA Arena; Milwaukee, WI
January 5, 1978		at TCU	W 90–41	9–2 (1–0)	Daniel–Meyer Coliseum; Fort Worth, TX
January 7, 1978		Texas Tech	W 90–41	10–2 (2–0)	Special Events Center; Austin, TX
January 10, 1978		at Houston	W 100–89	11–2 (3–0)	Hofheinz Pavilion; Houston, TX
January 14, 1978		No. 3 Arkansas	W 75–69	12–2 (4–0)	Special Events Center; Austin, TX
January 17, 1978	No. 15	Rice	W 78–64	13–2 (5–0)	Special Events Center; Austin, TX
January 23, 1978	No. 15	at Texas A&M	W 79–77 ^{OT}	14–2 (6–0)	G. Rollie White Coliseum; College Station, TX
January 25, 1978	No. 15	Baylor	W 78–76	15–2 (7–0)	Special Events Center; Austin, TX
January 28, 1978	No. 15	at SMU	W 85–80	16–2 (8–0)	Moody Coliseum; University Park, TX
January 30, 1978	No. 15	Houston	W 73–72	17–2 (9–0)	Special Events Center; Austin, TX
February 1, 1978	No. 12	at No. 2 Arkansas	L 71–75	17–3 (9–1)	Barnhill Arena; Fayetteville, AR
February 4, 1978	No. 12	TCU	W 87–60	18–3 (10–1)	Special Events Center; Austin, TX
February 7, 1978	No. 12	at Rice	W 102–86	19–3 (11–1)	Rice Gymnasium; Houston, TX
February 13, 1978	No. 12	Texas A&M	W 90–66	20–3 (12–1)	Special Events Center; Austin, TX
February 15, 1978	No. 12	at Baylor	L 77–79	20–4 (12–2)	Heart O' Texas Fair Complex; Waco, TX
February 18, 1978	No. 12	at Texas Tech	W 78–63	21–4 (13–2)	Lubbock Municipal Coliseum; Lubbock, TX
February 21, 1978	No. 14	SMU	W 82–74	22–4 (14–2)	Special Events Center; Austin, TX
SWC tournament
March 4, 1978	(1) No. 12	vs. (3) Houston; Final	L 90–92	22–5	The Summit; Houston, TX
NIT
March 10, 1978	No. 16	Temple; First Round	W 72–58	23–5	Special Events Center; Austin, TX
March 15, 1978	No. 17	Nebraska; Quarterfinal	W 67–48	24–5	Special Events Center; Austin, TX
March 19, 1978	No. 17	vs. Rutgers; Semifinal	W 96–76	25–5	Madison Square Garden; New York, NY
March 21, 1978	No. 17	vs. NC State; Final	W 101–93	26–5	Madison Square Garden; Houston, TX
*Non-conference game. ^{#}Rankings from AP Poll. (#) Tournament seedings in parentheses. All times are in Central Time.
