= 1977–78 Houston Cougars men's basketball team =

American college basketball season

1977–78 Houston Cougars men's basketball
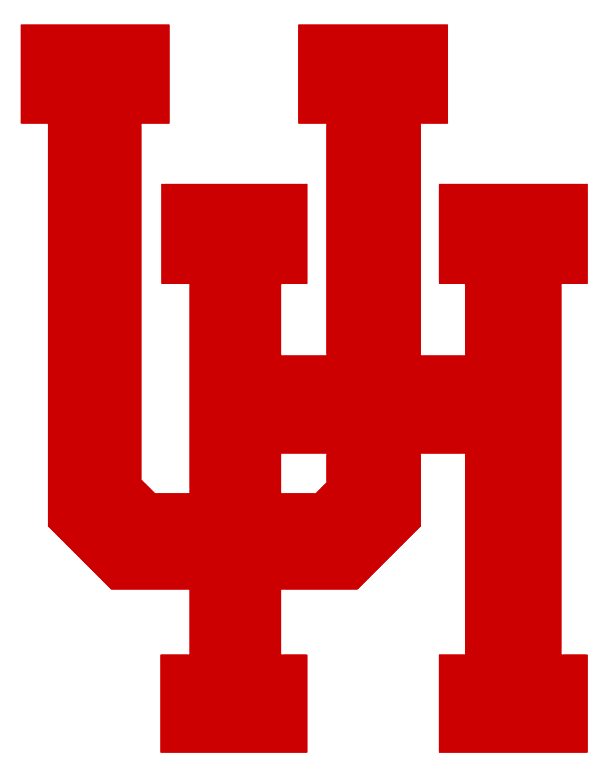

SWC tournament champions

NCAA tournament, First Round
- Conference: Southwest Conference

Ranking
- Coaches: No. 16
- Record: 25–8 (11–5 SWC)
- Head coach: Guy Lewis (22nd season)
- Assistant coaches: Harvey Pate; Don Schverak
- Home arena: Hofheinz Pavilion

1977–78 Southwest Conference men's basketball standings
| | Conf. | | | | Overall |
| Team | W | | L | PCT | W | | L | PCT |
|---|---|---|---|---|---|---|---|---|
| No. 5 Arkansas | 14 | – | 2 | .875 | 32 | – | 4 | .889 |
| No. 17 Texas | 14 | – | 2 | .875 | 26 | – | 5 | .839 |
| Houston † | 11 | – | 5 | .688 | 25 | – | 8 | .758 |
| Texas Tech | 10 | – | 6 | .625 | 19 | – | 10 | .655 |
| Baylor | 8 | – | 8 | .500 | 14 | – | 13 | .519 |
| SMU | 6 | – | 10 | .375 | 10 | – | 18 | .357 |
| Texas A&M | 5 | – | 11 | .313 | 12 | – | 15 | .444 |
| Rice | 2 | – | 14 | .125 | 4 | – | 22 | .154 |
| TCU | 2 | – | 14 | .125 | 4 | – | 22 | .154 |
† 1978 SWC tournament winner Rankings from AP Poll

The 1977–78 Houston Cougars men's basketball team represented the University of Houston in NCAA Division I competition in the 1977–78 season.

Houston, coached by Guy Lewis, played its home games in the Hofheinz Pavilion in Houston, Texas, and was then a member of the Southwest Conference.

== Roster ==
1977–78 Houston Cougars men's basketball team
Players
Coaches

| Pos. | # | Name | Height | Weight | Year | Previous school | Hometown |
|---|---|---|---|---|---|---|---|
| G | 00 | Cecile Rose | 6 ft 6 in (1.98 m) | 189 lb (86 kg) | Sr | | Nassau, The Bahamas |
| G | 14 | Ken Ciolli | 6 ft 0 in (1.83 m) | — | Jr |
| C | 30 | Mike Schultz | 6 ft 9 in (2.06 m) | — | Sr |
| F | 40 | Cedric Fears | 6 ft 6 in (1.98 m) | — | Jr |
| F | 44 | Charles Thompson | 6 ft 7 in (2.01 m) | 230 lb (104 kg) | Sr |

Head coach

- Guy Lewis (Houston)

Assistant coach(es)

- Harvey Pate (Oklahoma State)
- Don Schverak (Houston)

Legend

- (C) Team captain
- (S) Suspended
- (I) Ineligible
- (W) Walk-on
- Injured
- Current redshirt

Roster

== Schedule and results ==
| Date time, TV | Rank^{#} | Opponent^{#} | Result | Record | Site city, state |
Regular season
| Nov 28, 1977* | | Pan American | W 85–81 | 1–0 | Hofheinz Pavilion; Houston, Texas |
| Dec 1, 1977* | | at Auburn | W 88–87 | 2–0 | Memorial Coliseum; Auburn, Alabama |
| Dec 3, 1977* | | Southwestern Louisiana | W 96–72 | 3–0 | Hofheinz Pavilion; Houston, Texas |
| Dec 7, 1977* | | Texas Lutheran | W 118–69 | 4–0 | Hofheinz Pavilion; Houston, Texas |
| Dec 9, 1977* | | at Arizona | L 80–81 | 4–1 | McKale Center; Tucson, Arizona |
| Dec 10, 1977* | | at Arizona State | L 78–79 | 4–2 | ASU Activity Center; Tempe, Arizona |
| Dec 12, 1977* | | Southwestern | W 133–98 | 5–2 | Hofheinz Pavilion; Houston, Texas |
| Dec 16, 1977* | | Xavier; Bluebonnet Classic | W 100–75 | 6–2 | Hofheinz Pavilion; Houston, Texas |
| Dec 17, 1977* | | North Texas State; Bluebonnet Classic | W 137–94 | 7–2 | Hofheinz Pavilion; Houston, Texas |
| Dec 21, 1977* | | at Hawaii | W 104–68 | 8–2 | Neal S. Blaisdell Center; Honolulu, Hawaii |
| Dec 23, 1977* | | at Hawaii–Hilo | W 110–83 | 9–2 | Hilo Civic Auditorium; Hilo, Hawaii |
| Jan 5, 1978* | | Houston Baptist | W 103–51 | 10–2 | Hofheinz Pavilion; Houston, Texas |
| Jan 8, 1978 | | at No. 3 Arkansas | L 65–84 | 10–3 (0–1) | Barnhill Arena; Fayetteville, Arkansas |
| Jan 10, 1978 | | Texas | L 89–100 | 10–4 (0–2) | Hofheinz Pavilion; Houston, Texas |
| Jan 12, 1978 | | at Texas A&M | W 80–73 | 11–4 (1–2) | G. Rollie White Coliseum; College Station, Texas |
| Jan 14, 1978 | | at TCU | W 79–63 | 12–4 (2–2) | Daniel-Meyer Coliseum; Fort Worth, Texas |
| Jan 17, 1978 | | Baylor | W 100–89 | 13–4 (3–2) | Hofheinz Pavilion; Houston, Texas |
| Jan 21, 1978 | | Rice | W 96–74 | 14–4 (4–2) | Hofheinz Pavilion; Houston, Texas |
| Jan 23, 1978 | | at SMU | L 75–76 | 14–5 (4–3) | Moody Coliseum; University Park, Texas |
| Jan 25, 1978 | | Texas Tech | W 84–71 | 15–5 (5–3) | Hofheinz Pavilion; Houston, Texas |
| Jan 30, 1978 | | at No. 15 Texas | L 72–73 | 15–6 (5–4) | Special Events Center; Austin, Texas |
| Feb 1, 1978 | | TCU | W 93–55 | 16–6 (6–4) | Hofheinz Pavilion; Houston, Texas |
| Feb 4, 1978 | | Texas A&M | W 94–89 | 17–6 (7–4) | Hofheinz Pavilion; Houston, Texas |
| Feb 7, 1978 | | at Baylor | L 69–70 | 17–7 (7–5) | Heart O' Texas Coliseum; Waco, Texas |
| Feb 11, 1978 | | at Rice | W 87–62 | 18–7 (8–5) | Rice Gymnasium; Houston, Texas |
| Feb 13, 1978 | | SMU | W 95–55 | 19–7 (9–5) | Hofheinz Pavilion; Houston, Texas |
| Feb 15, 1978 | | at Texas Tech | W 81–77 | 20–7 (10–5) | Lubbock Municipal Coliseum; Lubbock, Texas |
| Feb 18, 1978 | | No. 1 Arkansas | W 84–75 | 21–7 (11–5) | Hofheinz Pavilion; Houston, Texas |
SWC tournament
| Feb 25, 1978* | (3) | (8) Rice; First round | W 108–67 | 22–7 | Hofheinz Pavilion; Houston, Texas |
| Mar 2, 1978* | (3) | vs. (4) Texas Tech; Quarterfinals | W 93–82 | 23–7 | The Summit; Houston, Texas |
| Mar 3, 1978* | (3) | vs. (2) No. 4 Arkansas; Semifinals | W 70–69 | 24–7 | The Summit; Houston, Texas |
| Mar 4, 1978* | (3) | vs. (1) No. 12 Texas; Championship | W 92–90 | 25–7 | The Summit; Houston, Texas |
NCAA tournament
| Mar 12, 1978* | | vs. No. 6 Notre Dame; First round | L 77–100 | 25–8 | Mabee Center; Tulsa, Oklahoma |
*Non-conference game. ^{#}Rankings from AP Poll. (#) Tournament seedings in parentheses. MW=Midwest. All times are in Central Time.

== Rankings ==
Ranking movements Legend: ██ Increase in ranking ██ Decrease in ranking — = Not ranked
| | Week | | | | | | | | | | | | | | | | |
| Poll | Pre | 1 | 2 | 3 | 4 | 5 | 6 | 7 | 8 | 9 | 10 | 11 | 12 | 13 | 14 | 15 | Final |
|---|---|---|---|---|---|---|---|---|---|---|---|---|---|---|---|---|---|
| AP | — | — | — | — | — | — | — | — | — | — | — | — | — | — | — | 14 | — |
| Coaches | — | — | — | — | — | — | — | — | — | — | — | — | — | — | — | — | 16 |
