= Jerome Lambert =

American basketball player (1971–2007)

Personal information
- Born: May 29, 1971 Arkadelphia, Arkansas, US
- Died: August 11, 2007 (aged 36) Rosston, Arkansas, US
- Listed height: 6 ft 8 in (2.03 m)
- Listed weight: 215 lb (98 kg)

Career information
- High school: Arkadelphia (Arkadelphia, Arkansas)
- College: Arkansas–Fort Smith (1991–1993); Baylor (1993–1994); Oklahoma State (1995–1996)
- NBA draft: 1996: undrafted
- Position: Power forward
- Number: 32

Career highlights
- NCAA rebounding leader (1994); First Team All-SWC (1994); SWC Newcomer of the Year (1994)

Joseph Jerome Lambert (May 29, 1971 – August 11, 2007) was an American professional basketball player who is best known for leading NCAA Division I in rebounding in 1993–94 while playing for Baylor. A 6 ft 8 in (2.03 m), 215 pound power forward, Lambert accomplished the feat as a junior in his first season of Division I basketball. He had previously played for Westark Community College before enrolling at Baylor.

During Lambert's recruitment to Baylor, then-assistant coach Gary Thomas had committed a major recruiting violation to acquire him. Thomas had faxed a term paper to Westark assistant basketball coach Troy Drummond on April 5, 1993, which was a slight re-write of an article that had previously appeared in a women's magazine. Lambert then handed the faxed paper in to an English class to pass it off as his own. He ultimately chose to play at Baylor, with Drummond "coincidentally" becoming a new assistant coach at that school, and news of this violation did not come out until after the 1993–94 season, the season in which Lambert's 14.8 rebounds per game led the NCAA. He also garnered many accolades that season, including First Team All-Southwest Conference (SWC), SWC Newcomer of the Year, SWC All-Newcomer Team, one-time SWC Player of the Week and a three-time SWC Newcomer of the Week.

Due to the scandal, Lambert transferred to Oklahoma State, but because of NCAA transfer rules he had to sit out one full year before becoming eligible to play his final season. In his lone season with the Cowboys, he averaged 13.0 points and 6.6 rebounds per game. He then went on to play professionally in Israel before coming home to work for Danfoss and serve as a firefighter.

Lambert died at age 36 in Nevada County, Arkansas. He and his wife, Tracey L. Green, were both shot to death as a result of a verbal altercation between Lambert and another man. The man who shot Lambert and his wife, Kelvin Box, was sentenced to two life sentences without a chance of parole the following year.

== See also ==
- List of NCAA Division I men's basketball season rebounding leaders
