= Jerry Mallett =

American baseball player (born 1935)

- Center fielder
- Born: September 18, 1935 (age 91); Bonne Terre, Missouri, U.S.
- Batted: Right Threw: Right

MLB debut
- September 19, 1959, for the Boston Red Sox

Last MLB appearance
- September 27, 1959, for the Boston Red Sox

MLB statistics
- Batting average: .267
- Home runs: 0
- Runs batted in: 1
- Stats at Baseball Reference

Teams
- Boston Red Sox (1959)

Gerald Gordon Mallett (born September 18, 1935) is an American former center fielder in Major League Baseball who played briefly for the Boston Red Sox during the 1959 season. Listed at 6 feet 5 inches (1.96 m), 208 pounds (94 kg), he batted and threw right-handed.

A two-sport star at Baylor University, Mallett also played basketball and was a Syracuse Nationals' fourth-round pick in the 1957 NBA draft. Instead, he opted for baseball and signed as a free agent with Boston in the same year.

In a four game-career, Mallett was a .267 hitter (4-for-15) with a scored run and an RBI. He batted .244 over six minor league seasons, spending much of his career at the Double-A level.
