= Darrell Hardy =

American basketball player (born 1944)

Personal information
- Born: 1944 (age 81–82)
- Listed height: 6 ft 7 in (2.01 m)
- Listed weight: 220 lb (100 kg)

Career information
- High school: Jefferson Davis (Houston, Texas)
- College: Baylor (1964–1967)
- NBA draft: 1967: 3rd round, 21st overall pick
- Drafted by: Detroit Pistons
- Playing career: 1967–1968
- Position: Forward
- Number: 44

Career history
- 1967–1968: Houston Mavericks

Career highlights
- Third-team Parade All-American (1962)
- Stats at Basketball Reference

Darrell Gene Hardy (born 1944) is an American retired basketball player. Hardy played college basketball for Baylor University and professionally from 1967 to 1968 with the Houston Mavericks of the ABA.

== College career ==
Hardy played college basketball at Baylor University.

== Professional career ==
He was selected in the third round of the 1967 NBA draft by the Detroit Pistons and in the 1967 ABA draft by the Anaheim Amigos.

Hardy played for the ABA's Houston Mavericks during the 1967–68 season, averaging 5.2 points per game and 3.3 rebounds per game.
