= Kenny Taylor (basketball) =

American basketball player (born 1982)

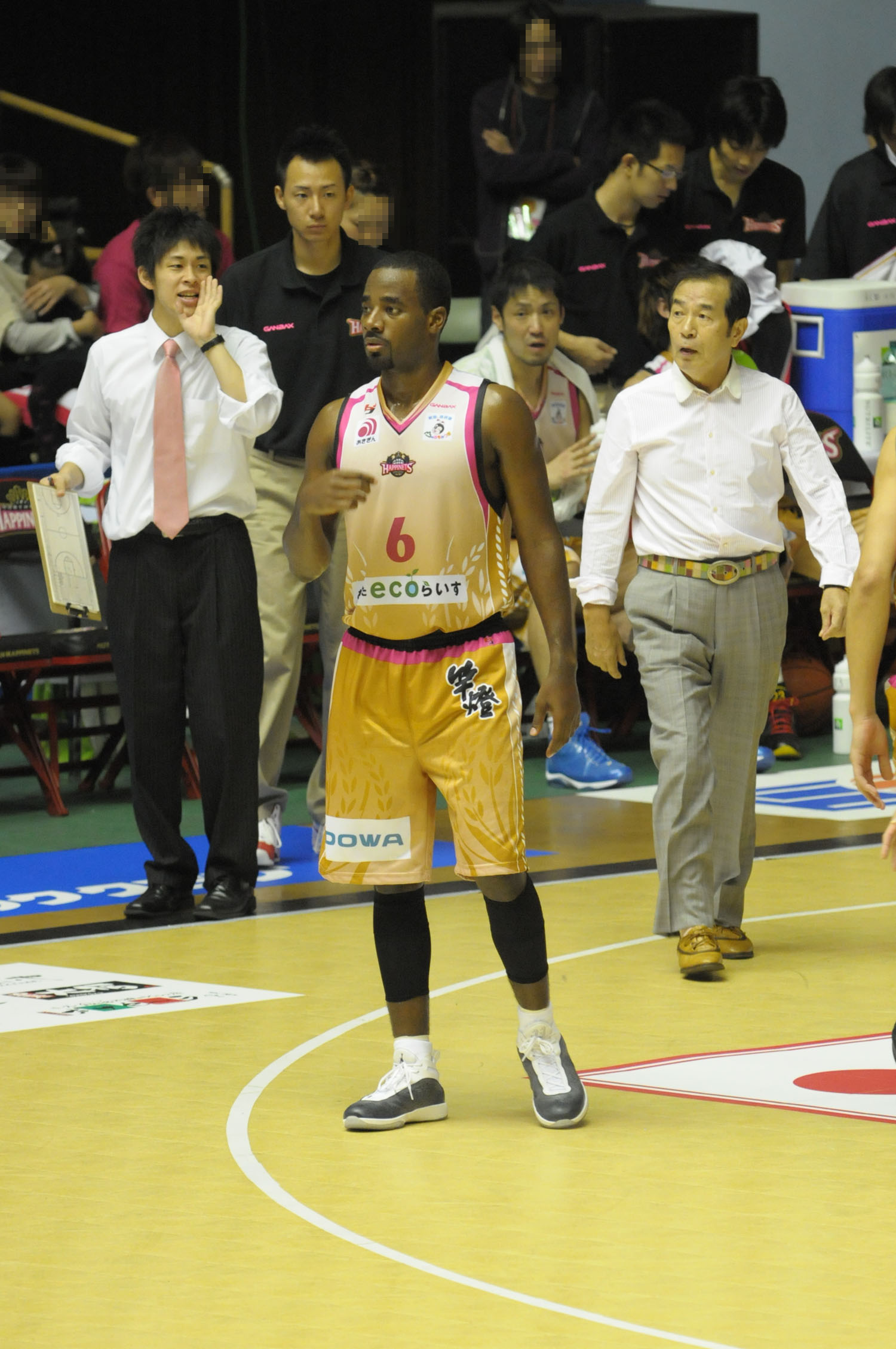
- Taylor at Akita Prefectural Gymnasium

Personal information
- Born: December 6, 1982 (age 43) Missouri City, Texas, U.S.
- Listed height: 192 cm (6 ft 4 in)
- Listed weight: 88 kg (194 lb)

Career information
- High school: Willowridge (Houston, Texas)
- College: Baylor University (2001–2003); University of Texas(2003–2005)
- NBA draft: 2005: undrafted
- Playing career: 2005–2014
- Position: Shooting guard
- Number: 6

Career history
- 2005–2006: KK Zagreb
- 2006: Aris Thessaloniki
- 2006–2007: UB La Palma
- 2007: KK Zagreb
- 2007: Correcaminos UAT Victoria
- 2007: Rio Grande Valley Vipers
- 2008: AO Kolossos Rodou
- 2008: Keravnos Strovolou
- 2008–2009: BC Igokea Partizan Aleksandrovac
- 2010: Marinos de Anzoategui
- 2010: Trotamundos de Carabobo
- 2010–2011: Bakersfield Jam
- 2011: Iowa Energy
- 2011: Akita Northern Happinets
- 2013–2014: South Houston Assault

Kenny Bernard Taylor (born December 6, 1982) is an American former professional basketball player for the Akita Northern Happinets of the Japanese bj league. He played college basketball for Baylor University and University of Texas.

== College statistics ==
Year	Team	GP	GS	MPG	FG%	3P%	FT%	RPG	APG	SPG	BPG	PPG
2001–02	Baylor	21	0	7.1	.450	.391	.750	0.7	0.2	0.2	0.0	3.9
2002–03	Baylor	28	28	26.7	.405	.390	.733	2.1	1.5	1.4	0.1	11.8
2003–04	Texas	33	2	19.0	.363	.358	.813	1.8	1.2	0.8	0.1	7.3
2004–05	Texas	31	21	28.6	.401	.361	.625	3.8	2.6	1.0	0.1	10.6
Career		113	51	21.3	.396	.373	.719	2.2	1.5	0.9	0.1	8.7

=== NCAA Awards & Honors ===
Big 12 All-Improved Team (Media) – 2003

== Career statistics ==
Legend
GP	Games played	GS	Games started	MPG	Minutes per game
FG%	Field goal percentage	3P%	3-point field goal percentage	FT%	Free throw percentage
RPG	Rebounds per game	APG	Assists per game	SPG	Steals per game
BPG	Blocks per game	PPG	Points per game	**Bold**	Career high

=== Regular season ===
Year	Team	GP	GS	MPG	FG%	3P%	FT%	RPG	APG	SPG	BPG	PPG
2005–06	Zagreb	16		35.1	.434	.355	.685	2.8	3.3	1.3	0.1	15.4
2005–06	Aris	6	0	7.3	.222	.000	.750	0.67	0.17	0.00	0.17	1.17
2006–07	Palma	18		24.1	.342	.325	.700	2.4	2.7	0.8	0.1	8.3
2006–07	Zagreb	8		35.3	.395	.386	.750	3.8	3.1	1.3	0.1	12.4
2007–08	Kolossos	14		30.7	.412	.373	.700	2.6	2.3	1.1	0.1	10.0
2007–08	RGV	14	12	34.9	.437	.462	.818	4.21	2.71	0.71	0.07	15.43
2010–11	BAK/IWA	45	2	19.1	.354	.360	.828	1.93	1.11	0.60	0.07	7.76
2011–12	Akita	8	2	14.8	.309	.267	.750	3.1	1.4	0.9	0.0	7.5

=== Playoffs ===
Year	Team	GP	GS	MPG	FG%	3P%	FT%	RPG	APG	SPG	BPG	PPG
2010–11	IWA	8	0	22.5	.404	.393	.571	2.25	0.75	0.88	0.12	6.62
