= 1977–78 Baylor Bears basketball team =

American college basketball season

1977–78 Baylor Bears men's basketball
- Conference: Southwest Conference
- Record: 14–13 (8–8 SWC)
- Head coach: Jim Haller
- Home arena: Heart O' Texas Coliseum

1977–78 Southwest Conference men's basketball standings
	Conf.				Overall
Team	W		L	PCT	W		L	PCT
No. 5 Arkansas	14	–	2	.875	32	–	4	.889
No. 17 Texas	14	–	2	.875	26	–	5	.839
Houston †	11	–	5	.688	25	–	8	.758
Texas Tech	10	–	6	.625	19	–	10	.655
Baylor	8	–	8	.500	14	–	13	.519
SMU	6	–	10	.375	10	–	18	.357
Texas A&M	5	–	11	.313	12	–	15	.444
Rice	2	–	14	.125	4	–	22	.154
TCU	2	–	14	.125	4	–	22	.154
† 1978 SWC tournament winner Rankings from AP Poll

The 1977–78 Baylor Bears men's basketball team represented the Baylor University in the 1977–78 NCAA Division I men's basketball season.

== Roster ==
1977–78 Baylor Bears men's basketball team
Players
Coaches

Pos.	#	Name	Height	Weight	Year	Hometown
G	12	Maurice Callis	6 ft 3 in (1.91 m)	170 lb (77 kg)	Sr	Victoria, Texas
C	45	Authur Edwards	6 ft 6 in (1.98 m)	230 lb (104 kg)	Sr	San Antonio, Texas
G	10	Barry Hankins	5 ft 11 in (1.8 m)	160 lb (73 kg)	Jr	Flint, Michigan
G	15	Vinnie Johnson	6 ft 1 in (1.85 m)	185 lb (84 kg)	Jr	Brooklyn, New York
F	22	Russell Oliver	6 ft 5 in (1.96 m)	195 lb (88 kg)	Sr	Urbana, Illinois
F	44	Chuck Stanley	6 ft 6 in (1.98 m)	187 lb (85 kg)	Fr	San Antonio, Texas
F	32	Jim Vaszauskas	6 ft 5 in (1.96 m)	200 lb (91 kg)	Jr	Lamesa, Texas
F	25	Marty Zeller	6 ft 6 in (1.98 m)	220 lb (100 kg)	Jr	McHenry, Illinois

Head coach

- Jim Haller

Assistant coach(es)

Legend

- (C) Team captain
- (S) Suspended
- (I) Ineligible
- (W) Walk-on
- Injured
- Current redshirt

== Schedule ==
Date time, TV	Rank^{#}	Opponent^{#}	Result	Record	Site city, state
Regular season
November 25*		McMurry	W 78–52	1–0	Heart O' Texas Coliseum; Waco, Texas
November 30*		at No. 3 Notre Dame	L 57–98	1–1	Joyce Center; South Bend, Indiana
December 3*		North Texas	W 104–74	2–1	Heart O' Texas Coliseum; Waco, Texas
December 6*		at Oklahoma	W 75–69	3–1	Lloyd Noble Center; Norman, Oklahoma
December 10*		Memphis	W 106–87	4–1	Heart O' Texas Coliseum; Waco, Texas
December 13*		Long Beach State	L 84–85	4–2	Heart O' Texas Coliseum; Waco, Texas
December 16*		vs. Pacific; Golden Gate Invitational	W 88–87	5–2	Cow Palace; San Francisco, California
December 17*		at No. 11 San Francisco; Golden Gate Invitational	L 93–98	5–3	Cow Palace; San Francisco, California
December 27*		at Drake	W 97–87	6–3	Veterans Memorial Auditorium; Des Moines, Iowa
January 3*		at Texas-Rio Grande Valley	L 80–86	6–4	UTPA Fieldhouse; Edinburg, Texas
January 7		at Rice	L 80–86	6–5 (0–1)	Tudor Fieldhouse; Houston, Texas
January 9		Texas A&M	W 77–61	7–5 (1–1)	Heart O' Texas Coliseum; Waco, Texas
January 12		Texas Tech	L 61–71	7–6 (1–2)	Heart O' Texas Coliseum; Waco, Texas
January 17		at Houston	L 89–100	7–7 (1–3)	Hofheinz Pavilion; Houston, Texas
January 21		at SMU	W 75–73	8–7 (2–3)	Moody Coliseum; University Park, Texas
January 23		No. 6 Arkansas	L 55–56	8–8 (2–4)	Heart O' Texas Coliseum; Waco, Texas
January 25		at No. 15 Texas	L 76–78	8–9 (2–5)	Frank Erwin Center; Austin, Texas
January 28		TCU	W 77–53	9–9 (3–5)	Heart O' Texas Coliseum; Waco, Texas
January 30		at Texas A&M	L 56–58	9–10 (3–6)	G. Rollie White Coliseum; College Station, Texas
February 4		at Texas Tech	L 62–78	9–11 (3–7)	Lubbock Municipal Coliseum; Lubbock, Texas
February 7		Houston	W 70–69	10–11 (4–7)	Heart O' Texas Coliseum; Waco, Texas
February 11		SMU	W 80–71	11–11 (5–7)	Heart O' Texas Coliseum; Waco, Texas
February 13		at No. 1 Arkansas	L 56–82	11–12 (6–8)	Barnhill Arena; Fayetteville, Arkansas
February 15		No. 12 Texas	W 79–77	12–11 (7–8)	Heart O' Texas Coliseum; Waco, Texas
February 18		Rice	W 75–65	13–11 (8–8)	Heart O' Texas Coliseum; Waco, Texas
February 21		at TCU	W 60–52	14–11 (9–8)	Daniel-Meyer Coliseum; Fort Worth, Texas
SWC tournament
February 25	(5)	(6) SMU; First round	L 68–73	14–12	Heart O' Texas Coliseum; Waco, Texas
*Non-conference game. ^{#}Rankings from AP Poll. (#) Tournament seedings in parentheses. All times are in Central Time.
