= Nelson Haggerty =

American former basketball coach and player (1973–2021)

Personal information
- Born: September 16, 1973 Houston, Texas, U.S.
- Died: April 16, 2021 (aged 47) Wise County, Texas, U.S.
- Listed height: 6 ft 0 in (1.83 m)
- Listed weight: 160 lb (73 kg)

Career information
- High school: Willowridge (Houston, Texas)
- College: Baylor (1991–1995)
- NBA draft: 1995: undrafted
- Position: Point guard
- Coaching career: 1997–2021

Career history

Coaching
- 1997–1999: Hutchinson CC (assistant)
- 2000–2002: North Shore Senior HS (assistant)
- 2003–2006: Pittsburg State (graduate assistant)
- 2007–2009: Central Missouri (assistant)
- 2009–2011: Midwestern State (assistant)
- 2011–2019: Midwestern State
- 2019–2021: North Texas (assistant)

Career highlights
- As player: NCAA assists leader (1995); As coach: 2× Lone Star Conference Coach of the Year (2012, 2016)

Nelson D. Haggerty (September 16, 1973 – April 16, 2021) was an American basketball coach and college basketball player. He had been serving as an assistant coach for the North Texas Mean Green at the time of his death. He played for the Baylor Bears, staying four years; in 1994–95 he led the NCAA Division I in assists, averaging 10.1 per game. He is the all-time leader for career assists for Baylor with 699.

== College career ==
Haggerty was born in Houston, Texas, where he attended Willowridge High School. In 1991 he signed to play for Baylor, and in his freshman season he started 15 of 22 games, playing 23.3 minutes per game and averaging 2.8 points, 2 rebounds and 3 assists: he ranked second on his team in assists per game behind David Wesley. After Wesley's graduation, Haggerty became the starting point guard for the Bears, and in his sophomore year he started 25 of 26 games, and improved his averages to 6.3 points, 3.2 rebounds and a team and Southwest Conference-leading 7.3 assists per game. On February 27, 1993, in a game against Oral Roberts, Haggerty recorded 19 assists, a career high and the Baylor all-time record for most assists in a single game.

Haggerty's junior season saw him playing 22 games (19 starts) averaging 6.1 points, 2.1 rebounds and 7.3 assists per game, which ranked him second in the SWC behind David Edwards of Texas A&M. On December 20, 1993, he posted 18 assists against Southwestern Louisiana, the second best mark in his career; this performance was tied for most assists in a single game in the 1993–94 NCAA Division I season. Haggerty also led his team in free throw percentage with a career-best 78.8%. In Haggerty's senior season he played a career-high 36.2 minutes per game, starting all of his 28 games, and recorded career highs in points per game (7.3), rebounds per game (3.9) and steals per game (1.2). His 10.1 assists per game (284 in 28 games) led the nation in the 1994–95 season, and were a Baylor all-time record for most assists in a season. Throughout the season he had several games with 13 or more assists, including 14 against Southwestern Louisiana on December 22, 1994, 16 against UMKC on February 1, 1995, and 18 against TCU on February 14. That year he was a second-team All-SWC selection by the Associated Press, the Houston Post and the Waco Tribune-Herald. His 699 career assists are a Baylor record as of 2019.

=== College statistics ===
*	Led NCAA Division I

Year	Team	GP	GS	MPG	FG%	3P%	FT%	RPG	APG	SPG	BPG	PPG
1991–92	Baylor	22	15	23.2	.261	.286	.667	2.0	3.0	0.5	0.0	2.8
1992–93	Baylor	26	25	35.3	.315	.349	.741	3.2	7.3	1.0	0.0	6.3
1993–94	Baylor	22	19	31.1	.319	.327	.788	2.1	7.3	0.9	0.1	6.1
1994–95	Baylor	28	28	36.2	.302	.225	.757	3.9	10.1	1.2	0.0	7.3
Career		98	87	31.9	.304	.294	.750	2.9	7.1	0.9	0.0	5.8

== Coaching career ==
After finishing his 4-year career at Baylor, Haggerty took up the assistant coach position at Hutchinson Community College in Hutchinson, Kansas, where he stayed two seasons from 1997 to 1999 under Tim Jankovich, obtaining a 50–14 record. He then served two years as an assistant coach at North Shore Senior High School in his hometown of Houston before moving to Pittsburg, Kansas where he was hired as a graduate assistant for the Pittsburg State Gorillas, joining head coach Gene Iba. In 2007 he joined Kim Anderson at Central Missouri, spending three seasons as an assistant coach.

In 2009 Haggerty entered the Midwestern State staff as an assistant to head coach Grant McCasland. After two years in the position, Haggerty was named head coach after McCasland took up an assistant coach job at Baylor. In his first season as a head coach, Haggerty had a 29–4 record (15–3 in conference play), won the conference tournament, and advanced to the NCAA Division II national quarterfinals. This performance earned him the Lone Star Conference Coach of the Year award. The following season he had a 22–9 record, reaching the conference tournament finals and advancing to the South Central regional semifinals. In 2013–14 his team advanced to the South Central Regional finals. In 2015–16 Haggerty again won the Lone Star Conference tournament after a 24–6 overall record (10–4 in conference play), and was named the Lone Star Conference Coach of the Year for the second time in his career.

In 2019 Haggerty left the head coach position at Midwestern State after eight seasons, and joined Grant McCasland's staff at North Texas as an assistant.

== Personal life ==
Haggerty died in a car accident on April 16, 2021, less than a month after the Mean Green played in the NCAA tournament.

He had a wife, Krissie, and four children (one son and three daughters).
