= 2022–23 Temple Owls men's basketball team =

American college basketball season

2022–23 Temple Owls men's basketball

Philadelphia Big 5 co-champions
- Conference: American Athletic Conference
- Record: 16–16 (10–8 AAC)
- Head coach: Aaron McKie (4th season)
- Associate head coach: Monté Ross
- Assistant coaches: Chris Clark; Jimmy Fenerty
- Home arena: Liacouras Center

2022–23 American Athletic Conference men's basketball standings
	Conf.				Overall
Team	W		L	PCT	W		L	PCT
No. 2 Houston	17	–	1	.944	33	–	4	.892
No. 24 Memphis †	13	–	5	.722	26	–	9	.743
Tulane	12	–	6	.667	20	–	11	.645
Cincinnati	11	–	7	.611	23	–	13	.639
Temple	10	–	8	.556	16	–	16	.500
Wichita State	9	–	9	.500	17	–	15	.531
UCF	8	–	10	.444	19	–	15	.559
South Florida	7	–	11	.389	14	–	18	.438
East Carolina	6	–	12	.333	16	–	17	.485
SMU	5	–	13	.278	10	–	22	.313
Tulsa	1	–	17	.056	5	–	25	.167
† 2023 AAC tournament winner Rankings from AP poll

The 2022–23 Temple Owls men's basketball team represented Temple University during the 2022–23 NCAA Division I men's basketball season. The Owls, led by fourth-year head coach Aaron McKie, played their home games at the Liacouras Center in Philadelphia, Pennsylvania as a member of the American Athletic Conference. They finished the season 16–16, 10–8 in AAC Play, to finish in 5th place. They lost in the quarterfinals of the AAC Tournament to Cincinnati.

== Previous season ==
The Owls finished the 2021–22 season 17–12, 10–7 in AAC Play to finish in fourth place. They lost in the quarterfinals of the AAC tournament to Tulane.

== Offseason ==
=== Departures ===
Name	Number	Pos.	Height	Weight	Year	Hometown	Reason for departure
Sage Tolbert III	3	F	6'8"	210	RS junior	New Orleans, LA	Transferred to San Jose State
Jake Forrester	10	F	6'9"	225	Senior	Harrisburg, PA	Graduated transferred to Saint Louis
Tai Stickland	13	G	6'2"	180	RS junior	Tampa, FL	Transferred to Georgia Southern
Arashma Parks	14	F	6'9"	230	RS junior	Cleveland, OH	Transferred to Detroit Mercy
Quincy Ademokoya	23	G	6'6"	185	Sophomore	Bloomington, IL	Transferred to Kennesaw State
Jeremiah Williams	25	G	6'5"	185	Sophomore	Chicago, IL	Transferred to Iowa State
Colin Daly	33	G	6'4"	185	GS senior	Havertown, PA	Walk-on; graduated

=== Incoming transfers ===
Name	Num	Pos.	Height	Weight	Year	Hometown	Previous school
Jamille Reynolds	4	F	6'10"	285	Sophomore	St. Petersburg, FL	UCF
Taj Thweatt	10	F	6'7"	210	Sophomore	Wildwood, NJ	West Virginia
Kur Jongkuch	15	F	6'9"	220	GS senior	Juba, South Sudan	Northern Colorado
Shane Dezonie	55	G	6'5"	215	Sophomore	Tobyhanna, PA	Vanderbilt

=== Recruiting classes ===
==== 2022 recruiting class ====
College recruiting
Name	Hometown	School	Height	Weight	Commit date
Deuce Roberts; SF	Lee's Summit, MO	St. Michael the Archangel Catholic	6 ft 7 in (2.01 m)	185 lb (84 kg)	Jun 4, 2022
Deuce Roberts; SF	Recruit ratings: Rivals: 247Sports: (0)				
Overall recruit ranking: 247Sports: 80
Note: In many cases, Scout, Rivals, 247Sports, On3, and ESPN may conflict in their listings of height and weight.; In these cases, the average was taken. ESPN grades are on a 100-point scale.; Sources: "2022 Team Ranking". Rivals.

==== 2023 recruiting class ====
College recruiting (2023)
Name	Hometown	School	Height	Weight	Commit date
Zion Stanford; SF	Philadelphia, PA	West Catholic Prep High School	6 ft 5 in (1.96 m)	195 lb (88 kg)	Sep 19, 2022
Zion Stanford; SF	Recruit ratings: Rivals: 247Sports: (0)				
Overall recruit ranking: 247Sports: 80
Note: In many cases, Scout, Rivals, 247Sports, On3, and ESPN may conflict in their listings of height and weight.; In these cases, the average was taken. ESPN grades are on a 100-point scale.; Sources: "2023 Team Ranking". Rivals.

== Roster ==
2022–23 Temple Owls men's basketball team
Players
Coaches

Pos.	#	Name	Height	Weight	Year	Previous school	Hometown
G	0	Khalif Battle	6 ft 5 in (1.96 m)	175 lb (79 kg)	RS Jr	Trenton Catholic Academy; Butler	Hillside, New Jersey
G	1	Damian Dunn	6 ft 5 in (1.96 m)	195 lb (88 kg)	RS Jr	Meadowcreek High School	Kinston, North Carolina
G	2	Jahlil White	6 ft 7 in (2.01 m)	205 lb (93 kg)	RS So	Wildwood Catholic High School	Whitesboro, New Jersey
G	3	Hysier Miller	6 ft 1 in (1.85 m)	170 lb (77 kg)	So	Neumann Goretti High School	Philadelphia, Pennsylvania
F	4	Jamille Reynolds	6 ft 10 in (2.08 m)	285 lb (129 kg)	So	Lakewood Senior High School; UCF	St. Petersburg, Florida
F	10	Taj Thweatt	6 ft 7 in (2.01 m)	210 lb (95 kg)	So	Wildwood Catholic Academy; Coastal Carolina	Wildwood, New Jersey
F	11	Nick Jourdain	6 ft 8 in (2.03 m)	205 lb (93 kg)	So	Covenant College Prep	Clifton, New Jersey
F	15	Kur Jongkuch	6 ft 9 in (2.06 m)	220 lb (100 kg)	Sr	St. Andre Bessette Catholic; Northern Colorado	Ontario, Canada
C	21	Emmanuel Okpomo	6 ft 10 in (2.08 m)	225 lb (102 kg)	So	Oak Hill Academy; Wake Forest	Delta State, Nigeria
G	22	Deuce Roberts	6 ft 6 in (1.98 m)	200 lb (91 kg)	Fr	Saint Michael the Archangel Catholic	Kansas City, Missouri
F	24	Zach Hicks	6 ft 8 in (2.03 m)	195 lb (88 kg)	So	Camden Catholic High School	Camden, New Jersey
G	32	Ryan Sayers (W)	6 ft 1 in (1.85 m)	175 lb (79 kg)	Sr	Owen J. Roberts High School	Pottstown, Pennsylvania
G	55	Shane Dezonie (redshirt)	6 ft 5 in (1.96 m)	215 lb (98 kg)	So	Brewster Academy; Vanderbilt	Tobyhanna, Pennsylvania

Head coach

- Aaron McKie (Temple)

Assistant coach(es)

- Monté Ross (Winston-Salem State)
- Chris Clark (Temple)
- Jimmy Fenerty (Dickinson)

Legend

- (C) Team captain
- (S) Suspended
- (I) Ineligible
- (W) Walk-on
- Injured
- Current redshirt

Roster

== Schedule and results ==
Date time, TV	Rank^{#}	Opponent^{#}	Result	Record	High points	High rebounds	High assists	Site (attendance) city, state
Non-conference regular season
November 7, 2022*; 7:00 p.m., ESPN+		Wagner	L 73–76 ^{OT}	0–1	29 – Dunn	7 – Jourdain	3 – Dunn	Liacouras Center (4,707); Philadelphia, PA
November 11, 2022*; 7:00 p.m., ESPNU		No. 16 Villanova; Philadelphia Big 5	W 68–64	1–1	22 – Dunn	12 – Reynolds	3 – Miller	Liacouras Center (8,646); Philadelphia, PA
November 15, 2022*; 7:00 p.m., ESPN+		Vanderbilt	L 87–89 ^{OT}	1–2	38 – Dunn	8 – Hicks	6 – Tied	Liacouras Center (4,491); Philadelphia, PA
November 18, 2022*; 5:00 p.m., ESPNU		vs. Rutgers; Basketball Hall of Fame Showcase	W 72–66	2–2	24 – Battle	9 – Reynolds	10 – Miller	Mohegan Sun Arena; Uncasville, CT
November 21, 2022*; 9:30 p.m., ESPNU		vs. St. John's; Empire Classic semifinals	L 72–78	2–3	21 – Reynolds	8 – Reynolds	5 – Hicks	Barclays Center (6,755); Brooklyn, NY
November 22, 2022*; 7:00 p.m., ESPN2		vs. Richmond; Empire Classic consolation	L 49–61	2–4	26 – Battle	7 – Miller	6 – Miller	Barclays Center (5,901); Brooklyn, NY
November 27, 2022*; 2:00 p.m., ESPN+		Drexel; City 6	W 73–61	3–4	25 – Battle	7 – Battle	4 – Miller	Liacouras Center (4,102); Philadelphia, PA
November 30, 2022*; 6:00 p.m., ESPN+		vs. La Salle; Philadelphia Big 5	W 67–51	4–4	22 – Battle	8 – Reynolds	6 – Dunn	Palestra (3,246); Philadelphia, PA
December 3, 2022*; 1:00 p.m., ESPNU		VCU	W 83–73	5–4	27 – Battle	6 – Battle	4 – Tied	Liacouras Center (4,094); Philadelphia, PA
December 6, 2022*; 7:00 p.m., ESPNU		Saint Joseph's; Rivalry	W 70–60	6–4	20 – Battle	10 – Hicks	6 – Dunn	Liacouras Center (4,402); Philadelphia, PA
December 10, 2022*; 1:00 p.m., NBCSP		at Penn; Philadelphia Big 5	L 57–77	6–5	14 – Battle	9 – Reynolds	4 – Dunn	Palestra (3,252); Philadelphia, PA
December 17, 2022*; 5:00 p.m., SECN		at Ole Miss	L 55–63	6–6	16 – Dunn	7 – Hicks	5 – Miller	SJB Pavilion (6,154); Oxford, MS
December 20, 2022*; 1:00 p.m., ESPN+		Maryland Eastern Shore	L 78–86	6–7	15 – Tied	8 – Battle	6 – Battle	Liacouras Center (3,546); Philadelphia, PA
AAC Regular Season
December 28, 2022; 7:00 p.m., ESPN+		at East Carolina	W 59–57	7–7 (1–0)	18 – Battle	9 – Jongkuch	3 – Miller	Williams Arena (4,352); Greenville, NC
January 1, 2023; 3:00 p.m., ESPN		Cincinnati	W 70–61	8–7 (2–0)	14 – tied	16 – White	7 – Miller	Liacouras Center (3,224); Philadelphia, PA
January 4, 2023; 7:00 p.m., ESPN+		at South Florida	W 68–64	9–7 (3–0)	19 – Dunn	7 – Tied	3 – White	Yuengling Center (2,327); Tampa, FL
January 7, 2023; 2:00 p.m., ESPN+		Tulane	L 76–87	9–8 (3–1)	21 – Battle	7 – Jourdain	4 – Battle	Liacouras Center (4,502); Philadelphia, PA
January 10, 2023; 8:00 p.m., ESPN+		at Tulsa	W 76–72	10–8 (4–1)	14 – Hicks	9 – Jongkuch	3 – Tied	Reynolds Center (3,053); Tulsa, OK
January 15, 2023; 3:00 p.m., ESPN2		Memphis	L 59–61	10–9 (4–2)	23 – Dunn	11 – White	2 – Tied	Liacouras Center (4,816); Philadelphia, PA
January 18, 2023; 7:00 p.m., ESPN+		East Carolina	W 73–58	11–9 (5–2)	22 – Dunn	7 – Battle	4 – Tied	Liacouras Center (4,007); Philadelphia, PA
January 22, 2023; 3:00 p.m., ESPN		at No. 1 Houston	W 56–55	12–9 (6–2)	16 – Dunn	10 – White	3 – Dunn	Fertitta Center (7,484); Houston, TX
January 25, 2023; 7:00 p.m., ESPN+		South Florida	W 79–76 ^{OT}	13–9 (7–2)	25 – Battle	7 – Tied	4 – Miller	Liacouras Center (4,971); Philadelphia, PA
January 28, 2023; 12:00 p.m., ESPNU		at UCF	W 77–70 ^{OT}	14–9 (8–2)	26 – Battle	7 – Battle	4 – Tied	Addition Financial Arena (4,594); Orlando, FL
February 5, 2023; 6:00 p.m., ESPN2		No. 3 Houston	L 65–81	14–10 (8–3)	24 – Battle	6 – Tied	4 – Tied	Liacouras Center (10,206); Philadelphia, PA
February 8, 2023; 8:00 p.m., ESPN+		at SMU	L 71–72	14–11 (8–4)	27 – Battle	11 – Hicks	6 – Dunn	Moody Coliseum (4,476); University Park, TX
February 12, 2023; 12:00 p.m., ESPN2		at Memphis	L 77–85	14–12 (8–5)	25 – Battle	6 – Tied	8 – Dunn	FedExForum (10,836); Memphis, TN
February 16, 2023; 7:00 p.m., ESPN+		Wichita State	L 65–79	14–13 (8–6)	17 – Miller	7 – Jourdain	4 – Tied	Liacouras Center (4,390); Philadelphia, PA
February 19, 2023; 2:00 p.m., ESPNU		Tulsa	W 76–53	15–13 (9–6)	24 – Dunn	6 – 4 Tied	9 – Miller	Liacouras Center (6,937); Philadelphia, PA
February 22, 2023; 7:00 p.m., ESPN2		at Cincinnati	L 83–88	15–14 (9–7)	34 – Dunn	7 – Hicks	6 – Miller	Fifth Third Arena (10,059); Cincinnati, OH
March 2, 2023; 7:00 p.m., ESPNU		UCF	W 57–55	16–14 (10–7)	11 – Dunn	9 – Jourdain	4 – Dunn	Liacouras Center (4,664); Philadelphia, PA
March 5, 2023; 2:00 p.m., ESPN+		at Tulane	L 82–83	16–15 (10–8)	21 – Dunn	8 – Jourdain	5 – Miller	Devlin Fieldhouse; New Orleans, LA
AAC Tournament
March 10, 2023; 3:00 p.m., ESPN2	(5)	vs. (4) Cincinnati; Quarterfinals	L 54–84	16–16	12 – Tied	8 – Hicks	5 – Miller	Dickies Arena; Fort Worth, TX
*Non-conference game. ^{#}Rankings from AP Poll. (#) Tournament seedings in parentheses. All times are in Eastern Time.
