= 2022–23 Memphis Tigers men's basketball team =

2022–23 Memphis Tigers men's basketball

AAC tournament champions

NCAA tournament, First Round
- Conference: American Athletic Conference

Ranking
- AP: No. 24
- Record: 26–9 (13–5 AAC)
- Head coach: Penny Hardaway (5th season)
- Assistant coaches: Frank Haith; Faragi Phillips; Andy Borman
- Home arena: FedExForum (Capacity: 18,119)

2022–23 American Athletic Conference men's basketball standings
	Conf.				Overall
Team	W		L	PCT	W		L	PCT
No. 2 Houston	17	–	1	.944	33	–	4	.892
No. 24 Memphis †	13	–	5	.722	26	–	9	.743
Tulane	12	–	6	.667	20	–	11	.645
Cincinnati	11	–	7	.611	23	–	13	.639
Temple	10	–	8	.556	16	–	16	.500
Wichita State	9	–	9	.500	17	–	15	.531
UCF	8	–	10	.444	19	–	15	.559
South Florida	7	–	11	.389	14	–	18	.438
East Carolina	6	–	12	.333	16	–	17	.485
SMU	5	–	13	.278	10	–	22	.313
Tulsa	1	–	17	.056	5	–	25	.167
† 2023 AAC tournament winner Rankings from AP poll

The 2022–23 Memphis Tigers men's basketball team represented the University of Memphis in the 2022–23 NCAA Division I men's basketball season. The Tigers were led by fifth-year head coach Penny Hardaway. The team played their home games at FedExForum as members of the American Athletic Conference. They finished the season 23–8, 13–5 in AAC Play to finish in second place. They defeated UCF and Tulane to advance to the championship game of the AAC tournament where they upset No. 1-ranked Houston to claim their first-ever AAC tournament championship. As a result, they received the conference's automatic bid to the NCAA tournament as the No. 8 seed in the East Region. There they were defeated by Florida Atlantic in the first round.

== Previous season ==
The Tigers finished the 2021–22 season 22–11, 13–5 in AAC Play to finish in third place. They defeated UCF and SMU to advance to the championship game of the AAC tournament where they lost to Houston. They received an at-large bid to the NCAA Tournament as the No. 9 seed in the West Region. There they defeated Boise State in the first round before losing to Gonzaga.

== Offseason ==
=== Departing players ===
Name	Number	Pos.	Height	Weight	Year	Hometown	Reason for departure
Earl Timberlake	0	G	6'6"	220	Sophomore	Washington, D.C.	Transferred to Bryant
Emoni Bates	1	F	6'9"	190	Freshman	Ypsilanti, MI	Transferred to Eastern Michigan
Jalen Duren	2	C	6'11"	250	Freshman	New Castle, DE	Declare for 2022 NBA draft; selected 13th overall by Charlotte Hornets
Landers Nolley II	3	G	6'7"	208	RS Junior	Fairburn, GA	Transferred to Cincinnati
Lester Quiñones	11	G	6'5"	208	Junior	Brentwood, NY	Declare for 2022 NBA draft; undrafted/signed with Golden State Warriors
Tyler Harris	14	G	5'9"	148	Senior	Memphis, TN	Walk-on; graduate transferred to South Florida
John Camden	15	F	6'8"	208	Freshman	Downingtown, PA	Transferred to Virginia Tech
Josh Minott	20	F	6'8"	205	Freshman	Boca Raton, FL	Declare for 2022 NBA draft; selected 45th overall by Charlotte Hornets
Sam Onu	55	C	6'11"	270	Freshman	Malvern, PA	Transferred to Florida Gulf Coast

=== Incoming transfers ===
Name	Number	Pos.	Height	Weight	Year	Hometown	Previous school
Elijah McCadden	0	G	6'4"	205	GS Senior	Rocky Mount, NC	Georgia Southern
Keonte Kennedy	1	G	6'5"	185	RS Senior	Austin, TX	UTEP
Kendric Davis	3	G	6'0"	180	GS Senior	Houston, TX	SMU
Kaodirichi Akobundu-Ehiogu	5	F	6'9"	202	RS Junior	Lagos, Nigeria	UT Arlington
Jahmar Young Jr.	10	F	6'9"	215	RS Senior	Oak Cliff, TX	SMU
James DeJesus	20	G	6'1"		Junior	Memphis, TN	Southwest Tennessee CC
Damaria Franklin	55	G	6'3"	205	GS Senior	Chicago, IL	UIC

=== 2022 recruiting class ===
College recruiting information
Name	Hometown	School	Height	Weight	Commit date
Ian Granja; F	Spain	Get Better Academy	6 ft 7 in (2.01 m)	N/A	Aug 6, 2022
Ian Granja; F	Recruit ratings: No ratings found				
Overall recruit ranking: Rivals: 1 247Sports: 1
Note: In many cases, Scout, Rivals, 247Sports, On3, and ESPN may conflict in their listings of height and weight.; In these cases, the average was taken. ESPN grades are on a 100-point scale.; Sources: "Memphis 2022 Basketball Commitments". Rivals.; "2022 Memphis Tigers Recruiting Class". ESPN.; "2022 Team Ranking". Rivals.; "2022 Memphis Tigers Basketball 24/7 Sports Commits". 247Sports.

== Roster ==
2022–23 Memphis Tigers men's basketball team
Players
Coaches

Pos.	#	Name	Height	Weight	Year	Previous school	Hometown
G	0	Elijah McCadden	6 ft 5 in (1.96 m)	195 lb (88 kg)	Sr	Georgia Southern	Rocky Mount, NC
G	1	Keonte Kennedy	6 ft 5 in (1.96 m)	180 lb (82 kg)	RS Sr	UTEP	Austin, TX
G	2	Alex Lomax	6 ft 0 in (1.83 m)	190 lb (86 kg)	GS	East HS	Memphis, TN
G	3	Kendric Davis	6 ft 0 in (1.83 m)	177 lb (80 kg)	GS	SMU	Houston, TX
F	4	Chandler Lawson	6 ft 7 in (2.01 m)	215 lb (98 kg)	Sr	Oregon	Memphis, TN
F	5	Kaodirichi Akobundu-Ehiogu	6 ft 10 in (2.08 m)	210 lb (95 kg)	RS Jr	UT Arlington	Lagos, Nigeria
F	10	Jahmar Young Jr.	6 ft 10 in (2.08 m)	223 lb (101 kg)	RS Sr	SMU	Oak Cliff, TX
G	11	Johnathan Lawson	6 ft 6 in (1.98 m)	190 lb (86 kg)	So	Wooddale HS	Memphis, TN
F	12	DeAndre Williams	6 ft 9 in (2.06 m)	205 lb (93 kg)	GS	Evansville	Houston, TX
F	14	Ian Granja	6 ft 7 in (2.01 m)	188 lb (85 kg)	Fr	GBA Sojky Pelhrimov	Barcelona, Spain
G	20	James DeJesus (W)	6 ft 0 in (1.83 m)	160 lb (73 kg)	Jr	Southwest Tennessee CC	Memphis, TN
F	23	Malcolm Dandridge	6 ft 9 in (2.06 m)	260 lb (118 kg)	Sr	East HS	Memphis, TN
G	25	Jayden Hardaway (W)	6 ft 5 in (1.96 m)	207 lb (94 kg)	RS Sr	IMG Academy	Memphis, TN
G	30	Conor Glennon (W)	5 ft 10 in (1.78 m)	177 lb (80 kg)	Jr	Brother Rice HS	Chicago, IL
G	31	Tadarius Jacobs (W)	6 ft 1 in (1.85 m)	170 lb (77 kg)	So	Bartlett HS	Memphis, TN
G	55	Damaria Franklin	6 ft 3 in (1.91 m)	200 lb (91 kg)	RS Sr	UIC	Chicago, IL

Head coach

- Penny Hardaway (Memphis)

Assistant coach(es)

- Frank Haith (Elon)
- Faragi Phillips (Mississippi Valley State)
- Andy Borman (Duke)

Legend

- (C) Team captain
- (S) Suspended
- (I) Ineligible
- (W) Walk-on
- Injured
- Current redshirt

Roster

== Schedule and results ==
Date time, TV	Rank^{#}	Opponent^{#}	Result	Record	High points	High rebounds	High assists	Site (attendance) city, state
Exhibition
October 23, 2022*; 4:00 p.m.		Christian Brothers	W 69–60	–	22 – Davis	9 – Williams	6 – Davis	FedExForum (8,839); Memphis, TN
October 30, 2022*; 1:00 p.m.		Lane College	W 96–62	–	22 – Williams	15 – C. Lawson	6 – Williams	FedExForum (8,672); Memphis, TN
Non-conference regular season
November 7, 2022*; 7:00 p.m., SECN+		at Vanderbilt	W 76–67	1–0	17 – Williams	10 – Lomax	6 – Davis	Memorial Gymnasium (10,380); Nashville, TN
November 15, 2022*; 8:00 p.m., CBSSN		at Saint Louis	L 84–90	1–1	21 – Williams	12 – Williams	6 – Lomax	Chaifetz Arena (7,925); St. Louis, MO
November 20, 2022*; 4:00 p.m., ESPN+		VCU	W 62–47	2–1	26 – Davis	10 – Williams	7 – Davis	FedEx Forum (10,653); Memphis, TN
November 24, 2022*; 6:30 p.m., ESPNews		vs. Seton Hall; ESPN Events Invitational Quarterfinals	L 69–70	2–2	22 – Davis	8 – C. Lawson	6 – Davis	State Farm Field House (1,621); Orlando, FL
November 25, 2022*; 4:30 p.m., ESPNews		vs. Nebraska; ESPN Events Invitational Consolation 2nd round	W 73–61	3–2	21 – Davis	7 – Williams	7 – Davis	State Farm Field House; Orlando, FL
November 27, 2022*; 10:00 a.m., ESPNU		vs. Stanford; ESPN Events Invitational 5th Place game	W 56–48	4–2	14 – Davis	8 – C. Lawson	6 – Williams	State Farm Field House; Orlando, FL
November 30, 2022*; 7:00 p.m., ESPN+		North Alabama	W 87–68	5–2	18 – Davis	6 – Lomax	8 – Lomax	FedEx Forum (9,473); Memphis, TN
December 3, 2022*; 6:30 p.m., ESPN2		Ole Miss	W 68–57	6–2	17 – Williams	14 – Williams	7 – Williams	FedEx Forum (13,264); Memphis, TN
December 6, 2022*; 7:00 p.m., ESPN+		Little Rock	W 87–71	7–2	17 – Williams	7 – Dandridge	5 – Williams	FedEx Forum (9,259); Memphis, TN
December 10, 2022*; 4:00 p.m., ESPN2		vs. No. 11 Auburn; Holiday Hoopsgiving	W 82–73	8–2	27 – Davis	11 – Williams	6 – Davis	State Farm Arena (7,795); Atlanta, GA
December 13, 2022*; 8:00 p.m., ESPN2		at No. 4 Alabama	L 88–91	8–3	30 – Davis	9 – Williams	5 – Davis	Coleman Coliseum (9,195); Tuscaloosa, AL
December 17, 2022*; 6:00 p.m., ESPNU		Texas A&M	W 83–79	9–3	23 – Davis	6 – Franklin	9 – Davis	FedExForum (11,544); Memphis, TN
December 21, 2022*; 7:00 p.m., ESPN+		Alabama State	W 83–61	10–3	25 – Williams	8 – McCadden	12 – Davis	FedExForum (10,193); Memphis, TN
AAC regular season
December 29, 2022; 7:00 p.m., ESPN+		South Florida	W 93–86	11–3 (1–0)	24 – Davis	7 – Williams	9 – Davis	FedExForum (10,786); Memphis, TN
January 1, 2023; 4:00 p.m., ESPN		at Tulane	L 89–96	11–4 (1–1)	31 – Davis	12 – Williams	7 – Davis	Devlin Fieldhouse (1,548); New Orleans, LA
January 7, 2023; 1:00 p.m., ESPN+		East Carolina	W 69–59	12–4 (2–1)	19 – Williams	4 – Tied	6 – Tied	FedExForum (11,328); Memphis, TN
January 11, 2023; 6:00 p.m., ESPN+		at UCF	L 104–107 ^{2OT}	12–5 (2–2)	42 – Davis	7 – McFadden	4 – Tied	Addition Financial Arena (6,812); Orlando, FL
January 15, 2023; 2:00 p.m., ESPN2		at Temple	W 61–59	13–5 (3–2)	20 – Tied	9 – Williams	4 – Kennedy	Liacouras Center (4,816); Philadelphia, PA
January 19, 2023; 6:00 p.m., ESPNU		Wichita State	W 88–78	14–5 (4–2)	29 – Williams	15 – Williams	5 – Davis	FedExForum (11,238); Memphis, TN
January 22, 2023; 12:00 p.m., ESPN2		at Cincinnati; Rivalry	W 75–68	15–5 (5–2)	26 – Williams	8 – Williams	6 – Davis	Fifth Third Arena (8,622); Cincinnati, OH
January 26, 2023; 6:00 p.m., ESPN2		SMU	W 99–84	16–5 (6–2)	25 – Davis	9 – Lawson	11 – Davis	FedExForum (10,489); Memphis, TN
January 29, 2023; 4:00 p.m., ESPN2		at Tulsa	W 80–68	17–5 (7–2)	26 – Davis	11 – Williams	5 – Tied	Reynolds Center (3,602); Tulsa, OK
February 4, 2023; 1:00 p.m., ESPNU		Tulane	L 89–90 ^{OT}	17–6 (7–3)	26 – Davis	17 – Williams	7 – Davis	FedExForum (11,802); Memphis, TN
February 8, 2023; 6:00 p.m., ESPN+		at South Florida	W 99–81	18–6 (8–3)	26 – Williams	5 – Tied	8 – Davis	Yuengling Center (3,384); Tampa, FL
February 12, 2023; 11:00 a.m., ESPN2		Temple	W 86–77	19–6 (9–3)	26 – Williams	12 – Williams	6 – Williams	FedExForum (10,836); Memphis, TN
February 16, 2023; 7:00 p.m., ESPN+		UCF	W 64–63	20–6 (10–3)	16 – McCadden	7 – C. Lawson	2 – Tied	FedExForum (10,150); Memphis, TN
February 19, 2023; 2:00 p.m., ESPN		at No. 2 Houston	L 64–72	20–7 (10–4)	20 – McCadden	7 – Lomax	3 – Tied	Fertitta Center (7,730); Houston, TX
February 23, 2023; 6:00 p.m., ESPN2		at Wichita State	W 83–78	21–7 (11–4)	19 – Davis	9 – Williams	5 – Williams	Charles Koch Arena (6,966); Wichita, KS
February 26, 2023; 1:00 p.m., ESPN2		Cincinnati; Rivalry	W 76–73	22–7 (12–4)	22 – Davis	7 – Williams	3 – Davis	FedExForum (12,211); Memphis, TN
March 2, 2023; 8:00 p.m., ESPN2		at SMU	W 81–62	23–7 (13–4)	23 – Davis	12 – C. Lawson	10 – Davis	Moody Coliseum (4,332); University Park, TX
March 5, 2023; 11:00 a.m., CBS		No. 1 Houston	L 65–67	23–8 (13–5)	26 – Davis	7 – Dandridge	6 – Williams	FedExForum (18,437); Memphis, TN
AAC tournament
March 10, 2023; 6:00 p.m., ESPNU	(2)	vs. (7) UCF; Quarterfinals	W 81–76	24–8	35 – Williams	13 – Williams	7 – Davis	Dickies Arena; Fort Worth, TX
March 11, 2023; 4:00 p.m., ESPN2	(2)	vs. (3) Tulane; Semifinals	W 94–54	25–8	27 – Williams	11 – Williams	6 – Davis	Dickies Arena (6,943); Fort Worth, TX
March 12, 2023; 2:15 p.m., ESPN	(2)	vs. (1) No. 1 Houston; Championship	W 75–65	26–8	31 – Davis	13 – Williams	4 – Lomax	Dickies Arena; Fort Worth, TX
NCAA tournament
March 17, 2023*; 8:20 p.m., TNT	(8 E) No. 24	vs. (9 E) No. 25 Florida Atlantic; First Round	L 65–66	26–9	16 – Davis	13 – Williams	4 – Williams	Nationwide Arena (19,564); Columbus, OH
*Non-conference game. ^{#}Rankings from AP Poll. (#) Tournament seedings in parentheses. E=East. All times are in Central Time.

== Rankings ==
Ranking movements Legend: ██ Increase in ranking ██ Decrease in ranking — = Not ranked RV = Received votes
	Week																				
Poll	Pre	1	2	3	4	5	6	7	8	9	10	11	12	13	14	15	16	17	18	19	Final
AP	RV	RV	—	—	RV	RV														24	Not released
Coaches	—	—	—	—	RV	RV														RV	RV

*AP does not release post-NCAA Tournament rankings
