= 2022–23 East Carolina Pirates men's basketball team =

American college basketball season

2022–23 East Carolina Pirates men's basketball
- Conference: American Athletic Conference
- Record: 16–17 (6–12 AAC)
- Head coach: Michael Schwartz (1st season)
- Assistant coaches: Jake Morton; Riley Davis; Nick Matson
- Home arena: Williams Arena

2022–23 American Athletic Conference men's basketball standings
	Conf.				Overall
Team	W		L	PCT	W		L	PCT
No. 2 Houston	17	–	1	.944	33	–	4	.892
No. 24 Memphis †	13	–	5	.722	26	–	9	.743
Tulane	12	–	6	.667	20	–	11	.645
Cincinnati	11	–	7	.611	23	–	13	.639
Temple	10	–	8	.556	16	–	16	.500
Wichita State	9	–	9	.500	17	–	15	.531
UCF	8	–	10	.444	19	–	15	.559
South Florida	7	–	11	.389	14	–	18	.438
East Carolina	6	–	12	.333	16	–	17	.485
SMU	5	–	13	.278	10	–	22	.313
Tulsa	1	–	17	.056	5	–	25	.167
† 2023 AAC tournament winner Rankings from AP poll

The 2022–23 East Carolina Pirates men's basketball team represented East Carolina University during the 2022–23 NCAA Division I men's basketball season. The Pirates were led by first year head coach Michael Schwartz, and played their home games at Williams Arena at Minges Coliseum as ninth-year members of the American Athletic Conference. They finished the season 15–16, 6–12 in AAC Play to finish in ninth place. They defeated South Florida in the first round of the AAC tournament before falling to Houston in the quarterfinals.

== Previous season ==
The Pirates finished the 2021–22 season 15–15, 6–11 in AAC play to finish in ninth place. They lost in the first round of the AAC tournament to Cincinnati.

On March 11, 2022, ECU fired Dooley after four seasons. On March 16, 2022, the Pirates hired former Tennessee assistant Michael Schwartz as their next head coach.

== Offseason ==
=== Departures ===
Name	Number	Pos.	Height	Weight	Year	Hometown	Reason for departure
Alexis Reyes	0	G/F	6'7"	195	Freshman	Roxbury, MA	Transferred to Quinnipiac
Tristen Newton	2	G	6'5"	190	Junior	El Paso, TX	Transferred to UConn
Brandon Suggs	4	G/F	6'6"	185	Junior	Powder Springs, GA	Transferred to UCF
J. J. Miles	11	G	6'7"	215	GS Senior	Garysburg, NC	Graduated
Tremont Robinson-White	12	G	6'1"	170	Senior	Little Rock, AR	Left the team for personal reasons
Vance Jackson	13	F	6'9"	230	GS Senior	Pasadena, CA	Graduated
Tay Mosher	15	F	6'7"	215	Freshman	The Colony, TX	Transferred to Bryant
Alanzo Frink	20	F	6'8"	270	RS Junior	Jersey City, NJ	Turn pro
Marlon Lestin	25	F	6'9"	200	Freshman	Montreal, QC	Transferred to Murray State
Brenden Kelly	44	G	5'9"	165	Sophomore	Clark, NJ	Walk-on; transferred

=== Incoming transfers ===
Name	Num	Pos.	Height	Weight	Year	Hometown	Previous school
Quetin Diboundje	4	G	6'5"	217	Sophomore	Montpellier, France	Tennessee
Benjamin Bayela	5	G	6'6"		RS Junior	France	South Plains College
Jaden Walker	21	G	6'5"	200	Junior	Lawrenceville, GA	Iowa State

=== 2022 recruiting class ===
College recruiting information
Name	Hometown	School	Height	Weight	Commit date
Saxby Sunderland; PG	Oakton, VA	Flint Hill School	6 ft 3 in (1.91 m)	170 lb (77 kg)	Apr 28, 2022
Saxby Sunderland; PG	Recruit ratings: No ratings found				
Elijah Jones; PF	Baltimore, MD	Mt. Zion Prep	6 ft 8 in (2.03 m)	210 lb (95 kg)	Apr 28, 2022
Elijah Jones; PF	Recruit ratings: No ratings found				
Kalib LaCount; PG	Los Angeles, CA	King Drew Medical Magnet	5 ft 8 in (1.73 m)	150 lb (68 kg)	Apr 28, 2022
Kalib LaCount; PG	Recruit ratings: No ratings found				
Ezra Ausar; PF	Charlotte, NC	Liberty Heights Athletic Institute	6 ft 8 in (2.03 m)	230 lb (100 kg)	Apr 28, 2022
Ezra Ausar; PF	Recruit ratings: No ratings found				
Valentino Pinedo; PF	Spain	Sunrise Christian School	6 ft 7 in (2.01 m)	225 lb (102 kg)	May 18, 2022
Valentino Pinedo; PF	Recruit ratings: No ratings found				
Overall recruit ranking:
Note: In many cases, Scout, Rivals, 247Sports, On3, and ESPN may conflict in their listings of height and weight.; In these cases, the average was taken. ESPN grades are on a 100-point scale.; Sources: "East Carolina 2022 Basketball Commitments". Rivals.; "2022 East Carolina Pirates Recruiting Class". ESPN.; "2022 Team Ranking". Rivals.; "2022 East Carolina Pirates Basketball 24/7 Sports Commits". 247Sports.

=== 2023 recruiting class ===
College recruiting information (2023)
Name	Hometown	School	Height	Weight	Commit date
Cyr Malonga #65 C	Louisville, KY	Evangel Christian School	6 ft 10 in (2.08 m)	220 lb (100 kg)	Sep 12, 2022
Cyr Malonga #65 C	Recruit ratings: 247Sports: ESPN: (79)				
Overall recruit ranking:
Note: In many cases, Scout, Rivals, 247Sports, On3, and ESPN may conflict in their listings of height and weight.; In these cases, the average was taken. ESPN grades are on a 100-point scale.; Sources: "East Carolina 2023 Basketball Commitments". Rivals.; "2023 East Carolina Pirates Recruiting Class". ESPN.; "2023 Team Ranking". Rivals.; "2023 East Carolina Pirates Basketball 24/7 Sports Commits". 247Sports.

== Roster ==
2022–23 East Carolina Pirates men's basketball team
Players
Coaches

Pos.	#	Name	Height	Weight	Year	Previous school	Hometown
G	0	Saxby Sunderland	6 ft 3 in (1.91 m)	170 lb (77 kg)	Fr	Flint Hill School	Arlington, VA
G	1	Kalib LaCount	5 ft 8 in (1.73 m)	150 lb (68 kg)	Fr	King/Drew	Los Angeles, CA
F	2	Ezra Ausar	6 ft 9 in (2.06 m)	240 lb (109 kg)	Fr	Liberty Heights Athletic Institute	Atlanta, GA
G	3	RJ Felton	6 ft 3 in (1.91 m)	200 lb (91 kg)	So	Aiken	Aiken, SC
G	4	Quetin Diboundje	6 ft 5 in (1.96 m)	217 lb (98 kg)	So	Tennessee	Montpellier, France
G	10	Wynston Tabbs	6 ft 2 in (1.88 m)	195 lb (88 kg)	RS Sr	Boston College	Suitland, MD
F	11	Valentino Pinedo	6 ft 7 in (2.01 m)	225 lb (102 kg)	Fr	Sunrise Christian Academy	Madrid, Spain
G	12	Javon Small	6 ft 2 in (1.88 m)	180 lb (82 kg)	So	AZ Compass Prep	South Bend, IN
G	15	David Kasanganay (W)	6 ft 2 in (1.88 m)	180 lb (82 kg)	RS Sr	Navy	Charlotte, NC
G	20	Colin McKenzie (W)	6 ft 6 in (1.98 m)	—	Fr	First Baptist School (SC)	Charleston, SC
G	21	Jaden Walker	6 ft 5 in (1.96 m)	200 lb (91 kg)	Jr	Iowa State	Lawrenceville, GA
F	22	Jaxon Ellingsworth (W)	6 ft 9 in (2.06 m)	205 lb (93 kg)	Fr	West Carteret	Morehead City, NC
F	23	Brandon Johnson	6 ft 8 in (2.03 m)	210 lb (95 kg)	Jr	Brunswick CC	Raleigh, NC
C	24	Ludgy Debaut	7 ft 0 in (2.13 m)	245 lb (111 kg)	RS Sr	NW Florida State College	Les Abymes, Guadeloupe
F	33	Elijah Jones	6 ft 8 in (2.03 m)	210 lb (95 kg)	Fr	Mt. Zion Prep	Pleasantville, NJ

Head coach

- Michael Schwartz (Texas)

Assistant coach(es)

- Jake Morton (Miami (FL))
- Nick Matson (VMI)
- Riley Davis (Howard)

Legend

- (C) Team captain
- (S) Suspended
- (I) Ineligible
- (W) Walk-on
- Injured
- Current redshirt

Roster

== Schedule and results ==
Date time, TV	Rank^{#}	Opponent^{#}	Result	Record	High points	High rebounds	High assists	Site (attendance) city, state
Non-conference regular season
November 8, 2022*; 7:00 p.m., ESPN+		Mercer	W 77–75	1–0	24 – Johnson	7 – Johnson	5 – Small	Williams Arena (4,610); Greenville, NC
November 12, 2022*; 4:00 p.m., ESPN+		Presbyterian	W 77–57	2–0	23 – Felton	7 – Bayela	7 – Small	Williams Arena (3,726); Greenville, NC
November 16, 2022*; 7:00 p.m., ESPN+		Hampton	W 82–73	3–0	17 – Tied	12 – Johnson	6 – Small	Williams Arena (4,054); Greenville, NC
November 21, 2022*; 2:30 p.m., FloHoops		vs. Indiana State; Gulf Coast Showcase quarterfinals	L 75–79	3–1	27 – Small	13 – Johnson	2 – Tied	Hertz Arena (516); Estero, FL
November 22, 2022*; 11:00 a.m., FloHoops		vs. Toledo; Gulf Coast Showcase consolation 2nd round	W 86–75	4–2	24 – Small	10 – Johnson	7 – Small	Hertz Arena (213); Estero, FL
November 23, 2022*; 1:30 p.m., FloHoops		vs. UT Arlington; Gulf Coast Showcase 5th place game	W 79–65	5–1	18 – Small	13 – Felton	6 – Small	Hertz Arena (198); Estero, FL
November 26, 2022*; 7:00 p.m., ESPN+		at Old Dominion	L 50–71	5–2	13 – Small	6 – Johnson	3 – Tied	Chartway Arena (4,898); Norfolk, VA
November 29, 2022*; 7:00 p.m., ESPN+		South Carolina State	L 68–73	5–3	18 – Ausar	7 – Ausar	7 – Small	Williams Arena (3,850); Greenville, NC
December 2, 2022*; 7:00 p.m., ESPN+		Campbell	W 79–69	6–3	25 – Felton	10 – Johnson	11 – Small	Williams Arena (3,833); Greenville, NC
December 6, 2022*; 7:00 p.m., FloHoops		at UNC Wilmington	L 61–74	6–4	19 – Small	9 – Johnson	3 – LaCount	Trask Coliseum (5,221); Wilmington, NC
December 11, 2022*; 2:00 p.m., ESPN+		Coppin State	W 84–75	7–4	21 – Small	10 – Johnson	10 – Small	Williams Arena (3,247); Greenville, NC
December 17, 2022*; 2:00 p.m., ESPN+		vs. South Carolina; Greenville Classic	W 64–56	8–4	21 – Felton	7 – Walker	6 – Small	Bon Secours Wellness Arena; Greenville, SC
December 21, 2022*; 6:00 p.m., ESPN+		High Point	W 60–49	9–4	16 – Johnson	15 – Johnson	8 – Small	Williams Arena (3,618); Greenville, NC
AAC Regular Season
December 28, 2022; 7:00 p.m., ESPN+		Temple	L 57–59	9–5 (0–1)	11 – Tied	18 – Johnson	4 – Johnson	Williams Arena (4,352); Greenville, NC
December 31, 2022; 4:00 p.m., ESPN+		at Wichita State	W 79–69	10–5 (1–1)	17 – Johnson	8 – Tied	7 – Walker	Charles Koch Arena (7,039); Wichita, KS
January 4, 2023; 7:00 p.m., ESPN+		UCF	L 61–64	10–6 (1–2)	16 – Tied	7 – Small	8 – Small	Williams Arena (3,675); Greenville, NC
January 7, 2023; 2:00 p.m., ESPN+		at Memphis	L 59–69	10–7 (1–3)	15 – Johnson	6 – Walker	4 – Small	FedExForum (11,328); Memphis, TN
January 11, 2023; 9:00 p.m., ESPNU		at Cincinnati	L 55–83	10–8 (1–4)	23 – Small	8 – Ausar	5 – Small	Fifth Third Arena (9,118); Cincinnati, OH
January 15, 2023; 1:00 p.m., ESPNU		South Florida	L 70–81	10–9 (1–5)	18 – Diboundje	12 – Johnson	6 – Walker	Williams Arena (3,969); Greenville, NC
January 18, 2023; 7:00 p.m., ESPN+		at Temple	L 58–73	10–10 (1–6)	14 – Diboundje	11 – Johnson	5 – Walker	Liacouras Center (4,007); Philadelphia, PA
January 24, 2023; 7:00 p.m., ESPN+		Tulsa	W 76–66	11–10 (2–6)	24 – Johnson	8 – Tied	4 – Tied	Williams Arena (3,886); Greenville, NC
January 29, 2023; 12:00 p.m., ESPNU		Wichita State	L 72–85	11–11 (2–7)	22 – Felton	9 – Debaut	3 – Tied	Williams Arena (4,191); Greenville, NC
February 1, 2023; 7:00 p.m., ESPNU		at South Florida	L 63–71	11–12 (2–8)	18 – Felton	8 – Ausar	5 – LaCount	Yuengling Center (2,516); Tampa, FL
February 4, 2023; 4:00 p.m., ESPN+		SMU	W 77–72	12–12 (3–8)	27 – Johnson	13 – Ausar	8 – Walker	Williams Arena (4,365); Greenville, NC
February 15, 2023; 7:00 p.m., ESPN+		Cincinnati	W 75–71	13–12 (4–8)	16 – Johnson	14 – Ausar	6 – Felton	Williams Arena (4,065); Greenville, NC
February 19, 2023; 3:00 p.m., ESPN+		at SMU	L 70–86	13–13 (4–9)	27 – Felton	6 – Johnson	10 – Walker	Moody Coliseum (4,561); University Park, TX
February 21, 2023; 8:00 p.m., ESPN+		at Tulsa	W 62–60	14–13 (5–9)	24 – Walker	9 – Tied	3 – Walker	Reynolds Center (3,002); Tulsa, OK
February 25, 2023; 8:00 p.m., ESPN2		No. 1 Houston	L 57–76	14–14 (5–10)	15 – Ausar	8 – Ausar	4 – Felton	Williams Arena (7,589); Greenville, NC
March 1, 2023; 9:00 p.m., ESPNU		Tulane	W 83–68	15–14 (6–10)	19 – Johnson	12 – Johnson	5 – Walker	Williams Arena (3,817); Greenville, NC
March 3, 2023; 7:00 p.m., ESPN+		at Tulane; Rescheduled from Feb. 11	L 78–81	15–15 (6–11)	23 – Felton	13 – Johnson	5 – Tied	Devlin Fieldhouse; New Orleans, LA
March 5, 2023; 2:00 p.m., ESPN+		at UCF	L 58–84	15–16 (6–12)	14 – Ausar	6 – Tied	2 – Walker	Addition Financial Arena (5,204); Orlando, FL
AAC tournament
March 9, 2023; 12:30 p.m., ESPNU	(9)	vs. (8) South Florida; First round	W 73–58	16–16	22 – Tied	7 – Felton	10 – Walker	Dickies Arena; Fort Worth, TX
March 10, 2023; 1:00 p.m., ESPN2	(9)	vs. (1) No. 1 Houston; Quarterfinals	L 46–60	16–17	18 – Ausar	19 – Ausar	6 – Walker	Dickies Arena; Fort Worth, TX
*Non-conference game. ^{#}Rankings from AP Poll. (#) Tournament seedings in parentheses. All times are in Eastern Time.
