= Eric Konkol =

American basketball player and coach (born 1976)

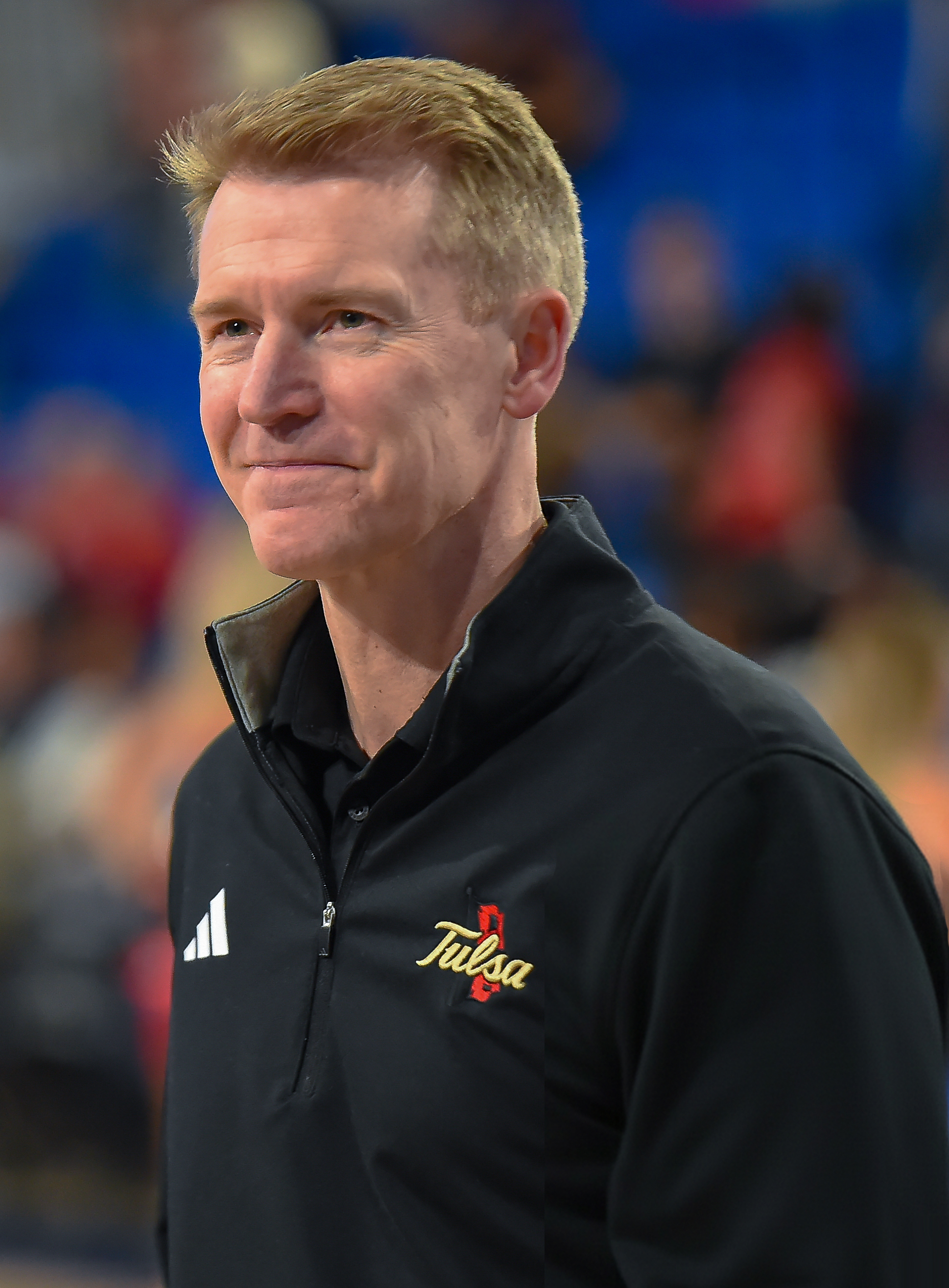
- Konkol coaching Tulsa in 2026

Current position
- Title: Head coach
- Team: Tulsa
- Conference: American
- Record: 64–68 (.485)

Biographical details
- Born: November 24, 1976 (age 49); Amherst, Wisconsin, U.S.

Playing career
- 1995–1997: Wisconsin–Platteville
- 1997–2000: Wisconsin–Eau Claire

Coaching career (HC unless noted)
- 2000–2001: Tulsa (student asst.)
- 2001–2002: Tennessee (GA)
- 2002–2005: George Mason (assistant)
- 2005–2007: Hopkins HS (assistant)
- 2007–2011: George Mason (assistant)
- 2011–2015: Miami (FL) (assistant)
- 2015–2022: Louisiana Tech
- 2022–present: Tulsa

Head coaching record
- Overall: 217–143 (.603)
- Tournaments: 7–2 (NIT); 0–1 (Vegas 16)

Accomplishments and honors

Championships
- C-USA West division (2021)

Awards
- C-USA Coach of the Year (2021)

Eric Konkol (born November 24, 1976) is an American college basketball coach and former player. He is the current head coach of the Tulsa Golden Hurricane men's basketball program.

== Coaching career ==
On May 18, 2015, Konkol was named by Louisiana Tech as the 18th head coach of the Bulldogs basketball team. He replaced former head coach Mike White, who accepted the head coaching position at the University of Florida.

Through seven seasons as head coach, Konkol had six seasons of more than 20 wins which is the most in Louisiana Tech men's basketball history. He was the fastest to 50 wins in school history and is currently 3rd on the all-time wins list. On March 21, 2022, Konkol was hired as head coach at Tulsa.

== Head coaching record ==
Record table
Season	Team	Overall	Conference	Standing	Postseason
Louisiana Tech Bulldogs (Conference USA) (2015–2022)
2015–16	Louisiana Tech	23–10	12–6	T–3rd	Vegas 16 Quarterfinal
2016–17	Louisiana Tech	23–10	14–4	2nd	
2017–18	Louisiana Tech	17–16	7–11	T–9th	
2018–19	Louisiana Tech	20–13	9–9	8th	
2019–20	Louisiana Tech	22–8	13–5	T–2nd	No postseason held
2020–21	Louisiana Tech	24–8	12–4	1st (West)	NIT 3rd Place
2021–22	Louisiana Tech	24–10	12–6	3rd (West)	
Louisiana Tech:		153–75 (.671)	79–45 (.637)		
Tulsa Golden Hurricane (American Athletic/American Conference) (2022–present)
2022–23	Tulsa	5–25	1–17	11th	
2023–24	Tulsa	16–15	7–11	T–8th	
2024–25	Tulsa	13–20	6–12	T–9th	
2025–26	Tulsa	30–8	13–5	T–2nd	NIT Runner-Up
2026–27	Tulsa	0–0	0–0		
Tulsa:		64–68 (.485)	27–45 (.375)		
Total:		217–143 (.603)			

1.Cancelled due to the Coronavirus Pandemic

== Personal life ==
Konkol grew up in Amherst, Wisconsin. His brother, Brian, is the President of Valparaiso University.
