= 2022–23 UCF Knights men's basketball team =

American college basketball season

2022–23 UCF Knights men's basketball

Bahamas Championship champions

NIT, Second Round
- Conference: American Athletic Conference
- Record: 19–15 (8–10 AAC)
- Head coach: Johnny Dawkins (7th season)
- Assistant coaches: Kevin Norris (7th season); Robbie Laing (7th season); Mamadou N'Diaye (2nd season)
- Home arena: Addition Financial Arena

2022–23 American Athletic Conference men's basketball standings
	Conf.				Overall
Team	W		L	PCT	W		L	PCT
No. 2 Houston	17	–	1	.944	33	–	4	.892
No. 24 Memphis †	13	–	5	.722	26	–	9	.743
Tulane	12	–	6	.667	20	–	11	.645
Cincinnati	11	–	7	.611	23	–	13	.639
Temple	10	–	8	.556	16	–	16	.500
Wichita State	9	–	9	.500	17	–	15	.531
UCF	8	–	10	.444	19	–	15	.559
South Florida	7	–	11	.389	14	–	18	.438
East Carolina	6	–	12	.333	16	–	17	.485
SMU	5	–	13	.278	10	–	22	.313
Tulsa	1	–	17	.056	5	–	25	.167
† 2023 AAC tournament winner Rankings from AP poll

The 2022–23 UCF Knights men's basketball team represented the University of Central Florida during the 2022–23 NCAA Division I men's basketball season. The Knights compete as members of the American Athletic Conference. The Knights, in the program's 54th season of basketball, were led by seventh-year head coach Johnny Dawkins and played their home games at the Addition Financial Arena on the university's main campus in Orlando, Florida. They finished the season 18–14, 8–10 in AAC Play to finish in 7th place. They defeated SMU in the first round of the AAC Tournament before losing in the quarterfinals to Memphis. The Knights received an at-large bid to the NIT, where they defeated Florida in the first round before losing in the second round to Oregon.

This was also the last season UCF played in the American Athletic Conference before moving to the Big 12 Conference.

== Previous season ==
The Knights finished the 2021–22 season 18–12 overall and 9–9 in AAC play to finish in sixth place.They defeated South Florida in the first round of the AAC tournament before losing to Memphis in the quarterfinals.

== Offseason ==
=== Departures ===
Name	Number	Pos.	Height	Weight	Year	Hometown	Reason for departure
Tony Johnson Jr.	1	G	6'3"	185	Junior	Eufaula, AL	Transferred
Darius Perry	2	G	6'2"	185	GS senior	Marietta, GA	Graduated
Isaiah Adams	3	F	6'6"	210	Freshman	Jacksonville, FL	Transferred to Buffalo
Jamille Reynolds	4	F	6'10"	285	Sophomore	St. Petersburg, FL	Transferred to Temple
Levy Renaud	10	G	6'2"	185	Senior	Fort Lauderdale, FL	Walk-on; left the team for personal reasons
Ed'Xavior Rhodes	12	F	6'9"	210	Freshman	Dallas, TX	Transferred
Brandon Mahan	13	G	6'5"	205	GS senior	Birmingham, AL	Graduated
Sean Mobley	20	F	6'8"	235	RS senior	Orlando, FL	Walk-on; left team for personal reasons
Darin Green Jr.	22	G	6'5"	190	Junior	Charlotte, NC	Transferred to Florida State
Dre Fuller Jr.	24	G	6'5"	215	RS junior	Fayetteville, NC	Transferred to Florida Atlantic
Ryan Anders	25	F	6'6"	235	Senior	Tampa, FL	Walk-on; left the team for personal reasons
Cheika Mbacke Diong	34	F	6'11"	235	RS senior	Dakar, Senegal	Graduated

=== Incoming transfers ===
Name	Num	Pos.	Height	Weight	Year	Hometown	Previous school
Lahat Thioune	0	C	6'10"	228	RS senior	Dakar, Senegal	Utah
Jayhlon Young	1	G	6'2"	168	RS sophomore	Dallas, TX	Baton Rouge CC
Michael Durr	2	C	7'0"	250	RS senior	Atlanta, GA	Indiana
Brandon Suggs	4	G/F	6'6"	185	Senior	Powder Springs, GA	East Carolina
Ithiel Horton	12	G	6'3"	200	RS senior	Vauxhall, NJ	Pittsburgh

=== 2022 recruiting class ===
College recruiting
Name	Hometown	School	Height	Weight	Commit date
Taylor Hendricks #17 C	Fort Lauderdale, FL	Calvary Christian Academy	6 ft 9 in (2.06 m)	210 lb (95 kg)	Mar 21, 2021
Taylor Hendricks #17 C	Recruit ratings: Scout: Rivals: 247Sports: ESPN: (85)				
Tyler Hendricks #59 SG	Fort Lauderdale, FL	Calvary Christian Academy	6 ft 4 in (1.93 m)	185 lb (84 kg)	Mar 21, 2021
Tyler Hendricks #59 SG	Recruit ratings: Scout: Rivals: 247Sports: ESPN: (79)				
Overall recruit ranking:
Note: In many cases, Scout, Rivals, 247Sports, On3, and ESPN may conflict in their listings of height and weight.; In these cases, the average was taken. ESPN grades are on a 100-point scale.; Sources: "2022 Team Ranking". Rivals.

=== 2023 recruiting class ===
College recruiting (2023)
Name	Hometown	School	Height	Weight	Commit date
Comeh Emuobor #80 SF	Raleigh, NC	Brewster Academy	6 ft 9 in (2.06 m)	210 lb (95 kg)	Sep 29, 2022
Comeh Emuobor #80 SF	Recruit ratings: Scout: Rivals: 247Sports: ESPN: (78)				
Joey Hart; SG	Linton, IN	Linton Stockton High School	6 ft 5 in (1.96 m)	180 lb (82 kg)	Aug 11, 2022
Joey Hart; SG	Recruit ratings: Scout: Rivals: 247Sports: ESPN: (NR)				
Overall recruit ranking:
Note: In many cases, Scout, Rivals, 247Sports, On3, and ESPN may conflict in their listings of height and weight.; In these cases, the average was taken. ESPN grades are on a 100-point scale.; Sources: "2023 Team Ranking". Rivals.

== Roster ==
2022–23 UCF Knights men's basketball team
Players
Coaches

Pos.	#	Name	Height	Weight	Year	Previous school	Hometown
C	0	Lahat Thioune	6 ft 10 in (2.08 m)	225 lb (102 kg)	RS Sr	Utah	Dakar, Senegal
G	1	Jayhlon Young	6 ft 2 in (1.88 m)	175 lb (79 kg)	RS So	Baton Rouge CC	Dallas, Texas
F	2	Michael Durr	7 ft 0 in (2.13 m)	250 lb (113 kg)	RS Sr	Indiana	Atlanta, Georgia
G	3	Darius Johnson	6 ft 1 in (1.85 m)	190 lb (86 kg)	So	Episcopal High School	Boyds, Maryland
G/F	4	Brandon Suggs	6 ft 6 in (1.98 m)	185 lb (84 kg)	Sr	East Carolina	Powder Springs, Georgia
G	5	P. J. Edwards	6 ft 4 in (1.93 m)	200 lb (91 kg)	So	Liberty Heights Athletic Institute	Springfield, Illinois
G	11	Tyem Freeman	6 ft 6 in (1.98 m)	210 lb (95 kg)	RS Jr	Indian Hills CC	Springfield, Missouri
G	12	Ithiel Horton	6 ft 3 in (1.91 m)	200 lb (91 kg)	RS Sr	Pittsburgh	Vauxhall, New Jersey
G	15	Tyler Hendricks	6 ft 5 in (1.96 m)	175 lb (79 kg)	Fr	Calvary Christian Academy	Fort Lauderdale, Florida
F	21	C. J. Walker	6 ft 8 in (2.03 m)	205 lb (93 kg)	Sr	Oregon	Sanford, Florida
F	25	Taylor Hendricks	6 ft 9 in (2.06 m)	210 lb (95 kg)	Fr	Calvary Christian Academy	Fort Lauderdale, Florida

Head coach

- Johnny Dawkins (Duke)

Assistant coach(es)

- Kevin Norris (Miami (FL))
- Robbie Laing (Troy)
- Mamadou N'Diaye (Auburn)

Legend

- (C) Team captain
- (S) Suspended
- (I) Ineligible
- (W) Walk-on
- Injured
- Current redshirt

Roster

== Schedule and results ==
Date time, TV	Rank^{#}	Opponent^{#}	Result	Record	High points	High rebounds	High assists	Site (attendance) city, state
Non-conference regular season
November 7, 2022*; 8:00 p.m., ESPN+		UNC Asheville	L 95–98 ^{2OT}	0–1	23 – Hendricks	9 – Horton	3 – Tied	Addition Financial Arena (4,603); Orlando, FL
November 11, 2022*; 7:00 p.m., ESPN+		Florida State	W 68–54	1–1	17 – Young	12 – Hendricks	4 – Young	Addition Financial Arena (6,485); Orlando, FL
November 14, 2022*; 7:00 p.m., ESPN+		Western Illinois	W 70–37	2–1	17 – Kelly	7 – Durr	2 – Tied	Addition Financial Arena (3,940); Orlando, FL
November 18, 2022*; 7:00 p.m., CBSSN		vs. Oklahoma State; Bahamas Championship semifinals	W 60–56 ^{OT}	3–1	18 – Kelly	12 – Hendricks	5 – Young	Baha Mar Convention Center; Nassau, BAH
November 20, 2022*; 7:00 p.m., CBSSN		vs. Santa Clara; Bahamas Championship Finals	W 57–50	4–1	19 – Hendricks	7 – Freeman	6 – Young	Baha Mar Convention Center (714); Nassau, BAH
November 23, 2022*; 7:00 p.m., ESPN+		Evansville	W 76–56	5–1	18 – Horton	8 – Hendricks	6 – Young	Addition Financial Arena (3,751); Orlando, FL
November 27, 2022*; 5:00 p.m., ESPNU		Miami (FL)	L 64–66	5–2	24 – Johnson	7 – Hendricks	2 – Tied	Addition Financial Arena (5,354); Orlando, FL
December 4, 2022*; 2:00 p.m., ESPN+		Samford	W 80–77 ^{OT}	6–2	21 – Hendricks	7 – Durr	5 – Johnson	Addition Financial Arena (4,052); Orlando, FL
December 11, 2022*; 12:00 p.m., ESPN+		Tarleton State	W 75–49	7–2	16 – Hendricks	9 – Hendricks	5 – Tied	Addition Financial Arena (3,880); Orlando, FL
December 14, 2022*; 7:30 p.m., SECN+		at Ole Miss	W 72–61	8–2	20 – Kelly	9 – Kelly	4 – Johnson	SJB Pavilion (5,215); Oxford, MS
December 17, 2022*; 12:00 p.m., BSFL		vs. Missouri; Orange Bowl Basketball Classic	L 66–68	8–3	19 – Horton	4 – Tied	6 – Johnson	FLA Live Arena; Sunrise, FL
December 21, 2022*; 7:00 p.m., ESPN+		Stetson	W 73–58	9–3	16 – Tied	10 – Hendricks	10 – Johnson	Addition Financial Arena (4,124); Orlando, FL
AAC regular season
December 28, 2022; 7:00 p.m., ESPN+		Wichita State	W 52–45	10–3 (1–0)	15 – Johnson	7 – Kelly	4 – Durr	Addition Financial Arena (4,225); Orlando, FL
December 31, 2022; 2:00 p.m., ESPN+		at No. 3 Houston	L 65–71	10–4 (1–1)	17 – Johnson	8 – Tied	4 – Johnson	Fertitta Center (7,457); Houston, TX
January 4, 2023; 7:00 p.m., ESPN+		at East Carolina	W 64–61	11–4 (2–1)	30 – Kelly	8 – Horton	3 – Tied	Williams Arena (3,675); Greenville, NC
January 8, 2023; 2:00 p.m., ESPNU		SMU	W 85–53	12–4 (3–1)	21 – Horton	10 – Young	6 – Young	Addition Financial Arena (4,576); Orlando, FL
January 11, 2023; 7:00 p.m., ESPN+		Memphis	W 107–104 ^{2OT}	13–4 (4–1)	30 – Horton	6 – Tied	7 – Kelly	Addition Financial Arena (6,812); Orlando, FL
January 14, 2023; 2:00 p.m., ESPN+		at Tulane	L 69–77	13–5 (4–2)	22 – Freeman	11 – Hendricks	4 – Tied	Devlin Fieldhouse (1,634); New Orleans, LA
January 21, 2023; 12:00 p.m., ESPNU		at South Florida; War on I-4	L 72–85	13–6 (4–3)	18 – Kelly	9 – Hendricks	4 – Kelly	Yuengling Center (5,715); Tampa, FL
January 25, 2023; 7:00 p.m., ESPN+		No. 3 Houston	L 71–82	13–7 (4–4)	18 – Horton	7 – Hendricks	5 – Kelly	Addition Financial Arena (9,383); Orlando, FL
January 28, 2023; 12:00 p.m., ESPNU		Temple	L 70–77 ^{OT}	13–8 (4–5)	13 – Tied	11 – Hendricks	4 – Johnson	Addition Financial Arena (4,594); Orlando, FL
February 4, 2023; 12:00 p.m., ESPNU		at Cincinnati	L 64–73	13–9 (4–6)	21 – Hendricks	8 – Hendricks	3 – Tied	Fifth Third Arena (10,351); Cincinnati, OH
February 8, 2023; 8:00 p.m., ESPN+		at Wichita State	W 72–67	14–9 (5–6)	23 – Hendricks	7 – Tied	5 – Horton	Charles Koch Arena (6,929); Wichita, KS
February 11, 2023; 7:00 p.m., ESPN+		Tulsa	W 96–52	15–9 (6–6)	20 – Horton	7 – Thione	10 – Johnson	Addition Financial Arena (6,731); Orlando, FL
February 16, 2023; 8:00 p.m., ESPN+		at Memphis	L 63–64	15–10 (6–7)	17 – Hendricks	6 – Tied	8 – Johnson	FedExForum (10,150); Memphis, TN
February 19, 2023; 12:00 p.m., ESPNU		Cincinnati	L 71–73	15–11 (6–8)	15 – Durr	5 – Durr	3 – Tied	Addition Financial Arena (5,213); Orlando, FL
February 22, 2023; 7:00 p.m., ESPNU		South Florida; War on I-4	L 75–82	15–12 (6–9)	28 – Horton	5 – Johnson	4 – Young	Addition Financial Arena (6,736); Orlando, FL
February 26, 2023; 5:00 p.m., ESPNU		at Tulsa	W 68–49	16–12 (7–9)	25 – Hendricks	8 – Tied	5 – Johnson	Reynolds Center (4,059); Tulsa, OK
March 2, 2023; 7:00 p.m., ESPNU		at Temple	L 55–57	16–13 (7–10)	19 – Kelly	7 – Hendricks	3 – Tied	Liacouras Center (4,664); Philadelphia, PA
March 5, 2023; 2:00 p.m., ESPN+		East Carolina	W 84–58	17–13 (8–10)	25 – Hendricks	10 – Hendricks	4 – Tied	Addition Financial Arena (5,204); Orlando, FL
AAC tournament
March 9, 2023; 2:30 p.m., ESPNU	(7)	vs. (10) SMU; First Round	W 76–70	18–13	21 – Kelly	8 – Hendricks	5 – Johnson	Dickies Arena (5,986); Fort Worth, TX
March 10, 2023; 7:00 p.m., ESPNU	(7)	vs. (2) Memphis; Quarterfinals	L 76–81	18–14	28 – Kelly	9 – Hendricks	4 – Johnson	Dickies Arena; Fort Worth, TX
NIT
March 15, 2023*; 7:00 p.m., ESPN2		at (4) Florida; First Round – Oregon Bracket	W 67–49	19–14	21 – Kelly	10 – Thioune	3 – Johnson	O'Connell Center (3,023); Gainesville, FL
March 19, 2023*; 7:30 p.m., ESPNU		at (1) Oregon; Second Round – Oregon Bracket	L 54–68	19–15	13 – Kelly	9 – Hendricks	2 – Tied	Matthew Knight Arena (3,019); Eugene, OR
*Non-conference game. ^{#}Rankings from AP Poll. (#) Tournament seedings in parentheses. All times are in Eastern Time.
