= 2022–23 Tulsa Golden Hurricane men's basketball team =

American college basketball season

2022–23 Tulsa Golden Hurricane men's basketball
- Conference: American Athletic Conference
- Record: 5–25 (1–17 AAC)
- Head coach: Eric Konkol (1st season)
- Assistant coaches: Duffy Conroy; Desmond Haymon; Yaphett King
- Home arena: Reynolds Center

2022–23 American Athletic Conference men's basketball standings
	Conf.				Overall
Team	W		L	PCT	W		L	PCT
No. 2 Houston	17	–	1	.944	33	–	4	.892
No. 24 Memphis †	13	–	5	.722	26	–	9	.743
Tulane	12	–	6	.667	20	–	11	.645
Cincinnati	11	–	7	.611	23	–	13	.639
Temple	10	–	8	.556	16	–	16	.500
Wichita State	9	–	9	.500	17	–	15	.531
UCF	8	–	10	.444	19	–	15	.559
South Florida	7	–	11	.389	14	–	18	.438
East Carolina	6	–	12	.333	16	–	17	.485
SMU	5	–	13	.278	10	–	22	.313
Tulsa	1	–	17	.056	5	–	25	.167
† 2023 AAC tournament winner Rankings from AP poll

The 2022–23 Tulsa Golden Hurricane men's basketball team represented the University of Tulsa during the 2022–23 NCAA Division I men's basketball season. The Golden Hurricane, led by first-year head coach Eric Konkol, played their home games at the Reynolds Center in Tulsa, Oklahoma as members of the American Athletic Conference (AAC). They finished the season 5–24, 1–17 in AAC play, to finish in 11th (last) place. They were defeated by Wichita State in the first round of the AAC tournament.

== Previous season ==
The Golden Hurricane finished the 2021–22 season 11–20, 4–14 in AAC play, to finish in tenth place. They defeated Wichita State in the first round of the AAC tournament before losing to SMU in the second round.

== Offseason ==
On March 12, 2022, head coach Frank Haith resigned. On March 21, the school named Louisiana Tech head coach Eric Konkol the team's new head coach.

=== Departures ===
Name	Number	Pos.	Height	Weight	Year	Hometown	Reason for departure
Curtis Haywood II	0	G	6' 5"	198	RS Senior	Oklahoma City, OK	Graduate transferred to Central Oklahoma
Gavyn Elkamil	4	G	6' 5"	190	Freshman	Pittsburg, KS	Transferred to Southeast Missouri State
Darien Jackson	11	G	6' 3"	203	GS Senior	Overland Park, KS	Graduated
Josh Earley	15	F	6' 7"	242	Junior	Shawnee Mission, KS	Transferred to Southeast Missouri State
Rey Idowu	25	F	6' 9"	243	Senior	Melbourne, Australia	Left team for personal reasons
LaDavis Draine	31	G	6' 4"	210	GS Senior	Calhoun City, MS	Graduated
Jeriah Horne	41	F	6' 7"	205	GS Senior	Overland Park, KS	Graduated

=== Incoming transfers ===
Name	Num	Pos.	Height	Weight	Year	Hometown	Previous school
Brandon Betson	11	G	6' 1"	180	Junior	Hercules, CA	Chicago State
Bryant Selebangue	33	F	6' 9"	215	RS Sophomore	LaSalle, QC	Florida SouthWestern State College

=== Recruiting classes ===
==== 2022 recruiting class ====
College recruiting information
Name	Hometown	School	Height	Weight	Commit date
Charles Chukwu #41 C	Katy, TX	Patricia E. Paetow High School	6 ft 10 in (2.08 m)	240 lb (110 kg)	Sep 6, 2021
Charles Chukwu #41 C	Recruit ratings: Scout: Rivals: 247Sports: ESPN: (79)				
Jesaiah McWright; SF	Houston, TX	Cy Falls High School	6 ft 4 in (1.93 m)	180 lb (82 kg)	Apr 6, 2022
Jesaiah McWright; SF	Recruit ratings: Scout: Rivals: 247Sports: ESPN: (0)				
BB Knight; SG	Katy, TX	Tompkins High School	6 ft 5 in (1.96 m)	190 lb (86 kg)	Apr 5, 2022
BB Knight; SG	Recruit ratings: Scout: Rivals: 247Sports: ESPN: (0)				
Overall recruit ranking:
Note: In many cases, Scout, Rivals, 247Sports, On3, and ESPN may conflict in their listings of height and weight.; In these cases, the average was taken. ESPN grades are on a 100-point scale.; Sources: "Tulsa 2022 Basketball Commitments". Rivals.; "2022 Team Ranking". Rivals.; "2022 Tulsa Golden Hurricane Basketball 24/7 Sports Commits". 247Sports.

== Roster ==
2022–23 Tulsa Golden Hurricane men's basketball team
Players
Coaches

Pos.	#	Name	Height	Weight	Year	Previous school	Hometown
G	0	Jesaiah McWright	6 ft 5 in (1.96 m)	180 lb (82 kg)	Fr	Cypress Falls HS	Houston, TX
G	1	Sam Griffin	6 ft 4 in (1.93 m)	180 lb (82 kg)	RS Jr	Westminster HS; UT Arlington	Miami, FL
G	2	Keyshawn Embery-Simpson	6 ft 3 in (1.91 m)	193 lb (88 kg)	RS Sr	Midwest City HS; Arkansas	Midwest City, OK
G	3	Sterling Gaston-Chapman	6 ft 5 in (1.96 m)	210 lb (95 kg)	So	Campus HS	Wichita, KS
G	4	BB Knight	6 ft 6 in (1.98 m)	160 lb (73 kg)	Fr	Tompkins HS	Katy, TX
G	5	Peyton Urbancic	6 ft 6 in (1.98 m)	199 lb (90 kg)	Jr	First Baptist Academy	Naples, FL
F	10	Tim Dalger	6 ft 7 in (2.01 m)	218 lb (99 kg)	RS Jr	Calvary Christian HS; Independence CC	Fort Lauderdale, FL
G	11	Brandon Betson	6 ft 1 in (1.85 m)	180 lb (82 kg)	Jr	Salesian College Prep; Chicago State	Hercules, CA
F	12	Nikita Konstantynovskyi	6 ft 10 in (2.08 m)	237 lb (108 kg)	Jr	Secondary School No. 163; Northeastern Oklahoma A&M College	Kyiv, Ukraine
G	14	Anthony Pritchard	6 ft 3 in (1.91 m)	170 lb (77 kg)	So	Webster HS	Tulsa, OK
F	15	Charles Chukwu	6 ft 8 in (2.03 m)	210 lb (95 kg)	Fr	Paetow HS	Katy, TX
G	23	Ari Seals (W)	6 ft 3 in (1.91 m)	171 lb (78 kg)	Jr	Frisco HS	Frisco, TX
F	33	Bryant Selebangue	6 ft 9 in (2.06 m)	215 lb (98 kg)	RS So	Rise Prep at TRC Academy; Florida SouthWestern State College	LaSalle, QC

Head coach

- Eric Konkol (UW–Eau Claire)

Assistant coach(es)

- Duffy Conroy (St. Ambrose)
- Desmond Haymon (Stephen F. Austin)
- Yaphett King (Cal State Fullerton)

Legend

- (C) Team captain
- (S) Suspended
- (I) Ineligible
- (W) Walk-on
- Injured
- Current redshirt

Roster
Last update: May 1, 2025

== Schedule and results ==
Date time, TV	Rank^{#}	Opponent^{#}	Result	Record	High points	High rebounds	High assists	Site (attendance) city, state
Non-conference regular season
November 7, 2022*; 11:00 p.m., P12N		at Oregon State	L 70–73	0–1	29 – Griffin	9 – Selebangue	2 – tied	Gill Coliseum (3,320); Corvallis, OR
November 12, 2022*; 2:00 p.m., ESPN+		Jackson State	W 85–79	1–1	20 – Embery-Simpson	10 – Selebangue	6 – Embery-Simpson	Reynolds Center (6,859); Tulsa, OK
November 17, 2022*; 8:30 p.m., ESPNU		vs. Loyola–Chicago; Myrtle Beach Invitational quarterfinals	W 85–66	2–1	20 – Griffin	10 – Selebangue	4 – Betson	HTC Center (1,143); Conway, SC
November 18, 2022*; 6:00 p.m., ESPNU		vs. Charlotte; Myrtle Beach Invitational semifinals	L 65–68	2–2	21 – Griffin	5 – tied	4 – Pritchard	HTC Center (1,305); Conway, SC
November 20, 2022*; 9:30 a.m., ESPNU		vs. Murray State; Myrtle Beach Invitational 3rd-place game	L 60–77	2–3	14 – Selebangue	11 – Selebangue	6 – Pritchard	HTC Center (1,335); Conway, SC
November 25, 2022*; 7:00 p.m., ESPN+		at Oklahoma State	L 56–82	2–4	10 – Embery-Simpson	5 – tied	5 – Betson	Gallagher-Iba Arena (9,856); Stillwater, OK
December 3, 2022*; 7:00 p.m., ESPN+		Oral Roberts; Rivalry	L 66–77	2–5	15 – Selebangue	12 – Selebangue	4 – Griffin	Reynolds Center (4,662); Tulsa, OK
December 7, 2022*; 7:00 p.m., ESPN+		Detroit Mercy	L 72–76	2–6	20 – Griffin	10 – Selebangue	6 – Pritchard	Reynolds Center (3,012); Tulsa, OK
December 10, 2022*; 2:00 p.m., ESPN+		Central Michigan	W 70–63	3–6	13 – tied	5 – tied	4 – Dalger	Reynolds Center (2,654); Tulsa, OK
December 16, 2022*; 7:00 p.m., ESPN+		Mississippi Valley State	W 66–51	4–6	15 – Betson	6 – Gaston-Chapman	4 – Pritchard	Reynolds Center (3,004); Tulsa, OK
December 21, 2022*; 9:00 p.m., WCC Network		at Loyola Marymount	L 64–76	4–7	13 – Griffin	7 – tied	5 – Pritchard	Gersten Pavilion (652); Los Angeles, CA
AAC regular season
December 28, 2022; 8:00 p.m., ESPNU		No. 3 Houston	L 50–89	4–8 (0–1)	13 – Selebangue	9 – Selebangue	4 – tied	Reynolds Center (4,807); Tulsa, OK
January 1, 2023; 2:00 p.m., ESPNU		at SMU	L 67–92	4–9 (0–2)	22 – Griffin	9 – Selebangue	5 – Pritchard	Moody Coliseum (3,385); University Park, TX
January 4, 2023; 6:00 p.m., ESPN+		at Tulane	L 77–93	4–10 (0–3)	22 – Selebangue	13 – Selebangue	7 – Pritchard	Devlin Fieldhouse (973); New Orleans, LA
January 10, 2023; 7:00 p.m., ESPN+		Temple	L 72–76	4–11 (0–4)	19 – Selebangue	12 – Selebangue	4 – Pritchard	Reynolds Center (3,053); Tulsa, OK
January 14, 2023; 3:00 p.m., ESPN+		at Wichita State; Rivalry	L 69–73	4–12 (0–5)	25 – Griffin	10 – Selebangue	3 – Embery-Simpson	Charles Koch Arena (7,157); Wichita, KS
January 18, 2023; 7:00 p.m., ESPN+		SMU	L 76–79 ^{OT}	4–13 (0–6)	24 – Selebangue	14 – Selebangue	5 – Pritchard	Reynolds Center (3,047); Tulsa, OK
January 21, 2023; 7:00 p.m., ESPN+		Tulane	W 81–79 ^{OT}	5–13 (1–6)	23 – Griffin	13 – Dalger	9 – Pritchard	Reynolds Center (7,071); Tulsa, OK
January 24, 2023; 6:00 p.m., ESPN+		at East Carolina	L 66–76	5–14 (1–7)	18 – Selebangue	10 – Selebangue	7 – Pritchard	Williams Arena (3,886); Greenville, NC
January 29, 2023; 4:00 p.m., ESPN2		Memphis	L 68–80	5–15 (1–8)	17 – Dalger	9 – Selebangue	5 – Pritchard	Reynolds Center (3,602); Tulsa, OK
February 1, 2023; 6:00 p.m., ESPN+		at Cincinnati	L 55–81	5–16 (1–9)	15 – Griffin	15 – Selebangue	2 – tied	Fifth Third Arena (9,334); Cincinnati, OH
February 5, 2023; 2:00 p.m., ESPN+		Wichita State; Rivalry	L 75–86	5–17 (1–10)	24 – Dalger	11 – Selebangue	4 – Betson	Reynolds Center (3,754); Tulsa, OK
February 8, 2023; 7:00 p.m., ESPN+		at No. 2 Houston	L 42–80	5–18 (1–11)	13 – Dalger	6 – Selebangue	3 – tied	Fertitta Center (7,369); Houston, TX
February 11, 2023; 6:00 p.m., ESPN+		at UCF	L 52–96	5–19 (1–12)	11 – Selebangue	10 – Selebangue	3 – Selebangue	Addition Financial Arena (6,731); Orlando, FL
February 15, 2023; 7:00 p.m., ESPN+		South Florida	L 69–96	5–20 (1–13)	21 – Selebangue	10 – Selebangue	3 – Betson	Reynolds Center (3,019); Tulsa, OK
February 19, 2023; 1:00 p.m., ESPNU		at Temple	L 53–76	5–21 (1–14)	15 – Dalger	7 – Dalger	4 – Betson	Liacouras Center (6,937); Philadelphia, PA
February 21, 2023; 7:00 p.m., ESPN+		East Carolina	L 60–62	5–22 (1–15)	20 – Betson	8 – Dalger	3 – Betson	Reynolds Center (3,002); Tulsa, OK
February 26, 2023; 4:00 p.m., ESPNU		UCF	L 49–68	5–23 (1–16)	12 – Selebangue	11 – Selebangue	3 – Betson	Reynolds Center (4,059); Tulsa, OK
March 1, 2023; 6:00 p.m., ESPN+		at South Florida	L 56–72	5–24 (1–17)	16 – Dalger	10 – Selebangue	5 – Betson	Yuengling Center (3,358); Tampa, FL
AAC tournament
March 9, 2023; 6:00 p.m., ESPNU	(11)	vs. (6) Wichita State; First round	L 63–81	5–25	21 – Dalger	7 – Selebangue	7 – Betson	Dickies Arena; Fort Worth, TX
*Non-conference game. ^{#}Rankings from AP poll. (#) Tournament seedings in parentheses. All times are in Central.
