= 2022–23 South Florida Bulls men's basketball team =

American college basketball season

2022–23 South Florida Bulls men's basketball
- Conference: American Athletic Conference
- Record: 14–18 (7–11 AAC)
- Head coach: Brian Gregory (6th season)
- Assistant coaches: Larry Dixon; Louis Rowe; Jason Slay
- Home arena: Yuengling Center

2022–23 American Athletic Conference men's basketball standings
	Conf.				Overall
Team	W		L	PCT	W		L	PCT
No. 2 Houston	17	–	1	.944	33	–	4	.892
No. 24 Memphis †	13	–	5	.722	26	–	9	.743
Tulane	12	–	6	.667	20	–	11	.645
Cincinnati	11	–	7	.611	23	–	13	.639
Temple	10	–	8	.556	16	–	16	.500
Wichita State	9	–	9	.500	17	–	15	.531
UCF	8	–	10	.444	19	–	15	.559
South Florida	7	–	11	.389	14	–	18	.438
East Carolina	6	–	12	.333	16	–	17	.485
SMU	5	–	13	.278	10	–	22	.313
Tulsa	1	–	17	.056	5	–	25	.167
† 2023 AAC tournament winner Rankings from AP poll

The 2022–23 South Florida Bulls men's basketball team represented the University of South Florida during the 2022–23 NCAA Division I men's basketball season. The season marked the 51st basketball season for USF, the tenth as a member of the American Athletic Conference, and the sixth season under head coach Brian Gregory. The Bulls played their home games at Yuengling Center on the university's Tampa, Florida campus. They finished the season 14–18, 7–11 in AAC play to finish in eighth place. They lost in the first round of the AAC tournament to East Carolina.

On March 10, 2023, the school fired head coach Brian Gregory after six seasons. On March 29, the school named Kennesaw State head coach Amir Abdur-Rahim the team's new head coach.

== Previous season ==
The Bulls finished the 2021–22 season 8–22, 3–15 in AAC play to finish in last place. They lost in the first round to UCF in the first round of the AAC tournament.

== Offseason ==
=== Departures ===
Name	Number	Pos.	Height	Weight	Year	Hometown	Reason for departure
Javon Greene	1	G	6'4"	195	GS senior	McDonough, GA	Graduated
Jalyn McCreary	4	F	6'8"	225	Junior	Marietta, GA	Transferred to Mercer
Bayron Matos	14	F	6'9"	260	RS Sophomore	Santo Domingo, DR	Left the team for personal reasons
Caleb Murphy	23	G	6'4"	185	Sophomore	Youngstown, OH	Transferred to DePaul
Lamont Evans IV	33	G	6'0"	155	Freshman	Hollywood, FL	Walk-on; transferred to Saint Louis

=== Incoming transfers ===
Name	Num	Pos.	Height	Weight	Year	Hometown	Previous school
Selton Miguel	1	G	6'4"	210	Sophomore	Luanda, Angola	Kansas State
Tyler Harris	2	G	5'9"	148	GS senior	Memphis, TN	Memphis
Keyshawn Bryant	23	F	6'6"	187	GS senior	Winter Haven, FL	South Carolina

=== Recruiting classes ===
==== 2022 recruiting class ====
College recruiting
Name	Hometown	School	Height	Weight	Commit date
Ryan Conwell; CG	Indianapolis, IN	Pike High School	6 ft 3 in (1.91 m)	190 lb (86 kg)	Jul 25, 2021
Ryan Conwell; CG	Recruit ratings: No ratings found				
Dok Muordar; C	Huntington, WV	Huntington Prep	6 ft 11 in (2.11 m)	200 lb (91 kg)	Apr 11, 2022
Dok Muordar; C	Recruit ratings: No ratings found				
Overall recruit ranking:
Note: In many cases, Scout, Rivals, 247Sports, On3, and ESPN may conflict in their listings of height and weight.; In these cases, the average was taken. ESPN grades are on a 100-point scale.; Sources: "2022 Team Ranking". Rivals.

==== 2023 recruiting class ====
College recruiting (2023)
Name	Hometown	School	Height	Weight	Commit date
Anthony Robinson; C	Arden, NC	Christ School	6 ft 10 in (2.08 m)	225 lb (102 kg)	Sep 30, 2022
Anthony Robinson; C	Recruit ratings: No ratings found				
Overall recruit ranking:
Note: In many cases, Scout, Rivals, 247Sports, On3, and ESPN may conflict in their listings of height and weight.; In these cases, the average was taken. ESPN grades are on a 100-point scale.; Sources: "2023 Team Ranking". Rivals.

== Roster ==
2022–23 South Florida Bulls men's basketball team
Players
Coaches

Pos.	#	Name	Height	Weight	Year	Previous school	Hometown
G	0	Ryan Conwell	6 ft 4 in (1.93 m)	195 lb (88 kg)	Fr	Pike High School	Indianapolis, Indiana
G/F	1	Selton Miguel	6 ft 4 in (1.93 m)	210 lb (95 kg)	So	Kansas State	Luanda, Angola
G	2	Tyler Harris	5 ft 9 in (1.75 m)	150 lb (68 kg)	GS	Memphis	Memphis, Tennessee
F	3	DJ Patrick	6 ft 6 in (1.98 m)	200 lb (91 kg)	So	Triton College	Powder Springs, Georgia
F	4	Dok Muordar	6 ft 11 in (2.11 m)	200 lb (91 kg)	Fr	Huntington Prep	Rumbek, South Sudan
F	5	Jake Boggs	6 ft 7 in (2.01 m)	200 lb (91 kg)	Jr	UNC Wilmington	Charlotte, North Carolina
G	10	Serrel Smith Jr.	6 ft 4 in (1.93 m)	175 lb (79 kg)	Sr	East Tennessee State	St. Petersburg, Florida
G	11	Trey Moss	6 ft 3 in (1.91 m)	180 lb (82 kg)	So	Windermere High School	Orlando, Florida
G	13	Mark Calleja (W)	6 ft 2 in (1.88 m)	185 lb (84 kg)	Sr	Hudson High School	Hudson, Florida
F	15	Corey Walker Jr.	6 ft 8 in (2.03 m)	215 lb (98 kg)	RS So	Tennessee	Jacksonville, Florida
F	20	Sam Hines Jr.	6 ft 6 in (1.98 m)	215 lb (98 kg)	So	Denver	Marietta, Georgia
G/F	22	Kenu Louissaint (W)	6 ft 3 in (1.91 m)	205 lb (93 kg)	Sr	Tampa Bay Technical High School	Port-au-Prince, Haiti
F	23	Keyshawn Bryant	6 ft 6 in (1.98 m)	190 lb (86 kg)	GS	South Carolina	Winter Haven, Florida
G	24	Jamir Chaplin	6 ft 5 in (1.96 m)	200 lb (91 kg)	Jr	Meadowcreek High School	Norcross, Georgia
C	54	Russel Tchewa	7 ft 0 in (2.13 m)	280 lb (127 kg)	Jr	Texas Tech	Douala, Cameroon

Head coach

- Brian Gregory (Oakland)

Assistant coach(es)

- Larry Dixon (Johnson C. Smith)
- Louis Rowe (James Madison)
- Jason Slay (West Virginia State)

Legend

- (C) Team captain
- (S) Suspended
- (I) Ineligible
- (W) Walk-on
- Injured
- Current redshirt

Roster

== Schedule and results ==
Date time, TV	Rank^{#}	Opponent^{#}	Result	Record	High points	High rebounds	High assists	Site (attendance) city, state
Exhibition
November 1, 2022*; 7:00 p.m.		Tampa	W 66–61		16 – Tied	11 – Tchewa	4 – Harris	Yuengling Center (1,216); Tampa, FL
Non-conference regular season
November 7, 2022*; 8:00 p.m., ESPN+		Southeast Missouri State	L 61–64	0–1	19 – Bryant	9 – Tchewa	2 – Chaplin	Yuengling Center (4,046); Tampa, FL
November 11, 2022*; 8:00 p.m., SECN+/ESPN+		at No. 15 Auburn	L 59–67	0–2	13 – Miguel	10 – Hines Jr.	3 – Harris	Neville Arena (9,121); Auburn, AL
November 14, 2022*; 7:00 p.m., ESPN+		Stetson	L 67–68	0–3	15 – Tied	7 – Tied	4 – Tied	Yuengling Center (2,369); Tampa, FL
November 17, 2022*; 7:00 p.m., ESPN+		Austin Peay; Sunshine Slam campus site game	L 60–62	0–4	14 – Harris	7 – Tchewa	4 – Tied	Yuengling Center (1,910); Tampa, FL
November 21, 2022*; 6:00 p.m., CBSSN		vs. UAB; Sunshine Slam semifinals	L 65–80	0–5	22 – Harris	7 – Walker Jr.	5 – Miguel	Ocean Center; Daytona Beach, FL
November 22, 2022*; 6:30 p.m., FloSports		vs. Saint Joseph's; Sunshine Slam Consolation Game	W 75–62	1–5	19 – Miguel	8 – Tchewa	6 – Miguel	Ocean Center; Daytona Beach, FL
November 25, 2022*; 2:00 p.m., ESPN+		St. Francis Brooklyn	W 75–60	2–5	18 – Tied	6 – Tied	6 – Miguel	Yuengling Center (2,241); Tampa, FL
November 29, 2022*; 7:00 p.m., ESPN+		UMass	L 67–73	2–6	15 – Harris	8 – Tchewa	6 – Miguel	Yuengling Center (2,723); Tampa, FL
December 2, 2022*; 7:00 p.m., ESPN+		Charleston Southern	W 79–59	3–6	15 – Harris	6 – Tied	8 – Conwell	Yuengling Center (2,292); Tampa, FL
December 12, 2022*; 8:00 p.m., ESPN+		at Northern Iowa	W 72–69	4–6	18 – Harris	8 – Tchewa	3 – Harris	McLeod Center (2,750); Cedar Falls, IA
December 16, 2022*; 7:00 p.m., ESPN+		Dartmouth	W 59–55	5–6	11 – Tchewa	8 – Tied	4 – Harris	Yuengling Center (2,606); Tampa, FL
December 19, 2022*; 7:00 p.m., ESPN+		Hofstra	W 77–70	6–6	19 – Harris	8 – Tied	4 – Harris	Yuengling Center (2,239); Tampa, FL
December 22, 2022*; 7:00 p.m., ESPN+		NJIT	W 92–73	7–6	23 – Miguel	12 – Tchewa	6 – Harris	Yuengling Center (2,026); Tampa, FL
AAC regular season
December 29, 2022; 8:00 p.m., ESPN+		at Memphis	L 86–93	7–7 (0–1)	21 – Smith Jr.	11 – Tchewa	5 – Conwell	FedExForum (10,786); Memphis, TN
January 4, 2023; 7:00 p.m., ESPN+		Temple	L 64–68	7–8 (0–2)	20 – Tchewa	12 – Tchewa	2 – Tied	Yuengling Center (2,327); Tampa, FL
January 8, 2023; 1:00 p.m., ESPN+		Wichita State	L 66–70	7–9 (0–3)	19 – Tchewa	10 – Tied	4 – Harris	Yuengling Center (2,572); Tampa, FL
January 11, 2023; 8:00 p.m., ESPN+		at No. 1 Houston	L 77–83	7–10 (0–4)	31 – Harris	8 – Tchewa	5 – Tied	Fertitta Center (7,473); Houston, TX
January 15, 2023; 1:00 p.m., ESPNU		East Carolina	W 81–70	8–10 (1–4)	24 – Harris	11 – Hines Jr.	4 – Tied	Williams Arena (3,969); Greenville, NC
January 18, 2023; 7:00 p.m., ESPN+		Cincinnati	L 69–85	8–11 (1–5)	15 – Miguel	6 – Hines	2 – Tied	Yuengling Center (3,359); Tampa, FL
January 21, 2023; 12:00 p.m., ESPNU		UCF; War on I-4	W 85–72	9–11 (2–5)	33 – Harris	12 – Tchewa	7 – Harris	Yuengling Center (5,715); Tampa, FL
January 25, 2023; 7:00 p.m., ESPN+		at Temple	L 76–79 ^{OT}	9–12 (2–6)	21 – Bryant	8 – Walker Jr.	6 – Harris	Liacouras Center (4,971); Philadelphia, PA
January 29, 2023; 4:00 p.m., ESPNU		SMU	L 80–82	9–13 (2–7)	23 – Harris	10 – Tchewa	4 – Conwell	Moody Coliseum (3,608); University Park, TX
February 1, 2023; 7:00 p.m., ESPNU		East Carolina	W 71–63	10–13 (3–7)	21 – Harris	11 – Tchewa	6 – Miguel	Yuengling Center (2,516); Tampa, FL
February 8, 2023; 7:00 p.m., ESPN+		Memphis	L 81–99	10–14 (3–8)	28 – Harris	12 – Tchewa	3 – Harris	Yuengling Center (10,411); Tampa, FL
February 11, 2023; 7:00 p.m., ESPN+		at Cincinnati	L 65–84	10–15 (3–9)	25 – Walker Jr.	7 – Conwell	6 – Harris	Fifth Third Arena (11,046); Cincinnati, OH
February 15, 2023; 8:00 p.m., ESPN+		at Tulsa	W 96–69	11–15 (4–9)	21 – Tchewa	8 – Tchewa	11 – Harris	Reynolds Center (3,019); Tulsa, OK
February 18, 2023; 8:00 p.m., ESPNU		Tulane	L 66–84	11–16 (4–10)	20 – Conwell	15 – Tchewa	3 – Miguel	Yuengling Center (7,014); Tampa, FL
February 22, 2023; 7:00 p.m., ESPNU		at UCF; War on I-4	W 82–75	12–16 (5–10)	14 – Tied	13 – Tchewa	5 – Miguel	Addition Financial Arena (6,736); Orlando, FL
February 25, 2023; 7:00 p.m., ESPN+		SMU	W 71–67	13–16 (6–10)	30 – Harris	9 – Tchewa	2 – Tied	Yuengling Center (3,862); Tampa, FL
March 1, 2023; 7:00 p.m., ESPN+		Tulsa	W 72–56	14–16 (7–10)	30 – Bryant	12 – Walker Jr.	4 – Harris	Yuengling Center (3,358); Tampa, FL
March 5, 2023; 3:00 p.m., ESPN+		at Wichita State	L 49–69	14–17 (7–11)	11 – Smith Jr.	9 – Hines Jr.	3 – Conwell	Charles Koch Arena (7,532); Wichita, KS
AAC tournament
March 9, 2023; 12:30 p.m., ESPNU	(8)	vs. (9) East Carolina; First round	L 58–73	14–18	26 – Harris	11 – Tchewa	3 – Tchewa	Dickies Arena; Fort Worth, TX
*Non-conference game. ^{#}Rankings from AP Poll. (#) Tournament seedings in parentheses. All times are in Eastern Time.
