= 2022–23 Wichita State Shockers men's basketball team =

American college basketball season

2022–23 Wichita State Shockers men's basketball
- Conference: American Athletic Conference
- Record: 17–15 (9–9 AAC)
- Head coach: Isaac Brown (3rd season)
- Assistant coaches: Butch Pierre; Tyson Waterman; Billy Kennedy
- Home arena: Charles Koch Arena

2022–23 American Athletic Conference men's basketball standings
	Conf.				Overall
Team	W		L	PCT	W		L	PCT
No. 2 Houston	17	–	1	.944	33	–	4	.892
No. 24 Memphis †	13	–	5	.722	26	–	9	.743
Tulane	12	–	6	.667	20	–	11	.645
Cincinnati	11	–	7	.611	23	–	13	.639
Temple	10	–	8	.556	16	–	16	.500
Wichita State	9	–	9	.500	17	–	15	.531
UCF	8	–	10	.444	19	–	15	.559
South Florida	7	–	11	.389	14	–	18	.438
East Carolina	6	–	12	.333	16	–	17	.485
SMU	5	–	13	.278	10	–	22	.313
Tulsa	1	–	17	.056	5	–	25	.167
† 2023 AAC tournament winner Rankings from AP poll

The 2022–23 Wichita State Shockers men's basketball team represented Wichita State University in the 2022–23 NCAA Division I men's basketball season. The Shockers, led by third year head coach Isaac Brown, played their home games at Charles Koch Arena in Wichita, Kansas as members of the American Athletic Conference. They finished the season 16–14, 9–9 in AAC Play to finish in sixth place. They defeated Tulsa in the first round of the AAC tournament before losing in the second round to Tulane.

On March 12, 2023, the school fired head coach Isaac Brown. On March 22, the school named Oral Roberts head coach Paul Mills the team's new head coach.

== Previous season ==
The Shockers finished the 2021–22 season 15–13, 6–9 in AAC play to finish in seventh place. They lost in the first round of the AAC tournament to Tulsa.

== Offseason ==
=== Departures ===
Departures
Name	Number	Pos.	Height	Weight	Year	Hometown	Reason for departure
Dexter Dennis	0	G	6'5"	210	Senior	Baker, LA	Graduate transferred to Texas A&M
Tyson Etienne	1	G	6'2"	203	Junior	Englewood, NJ	Declare for 2022 NBA draft
Chaunce Jenkins	2	G	6'4"	175	Sophomore	Newport News, VA	Transferred to Old Dominion
Ricky Council IV	4	G	6'6"	204	Sophomore	Durham, NC	Transferred to Arkansas
Clarence Jackson	5	F	6'7"	223	Junior	Dublin, GA	Transferred to Jacksonville State
Steele Gaston-Chapman	12	G	6'1"	185	Sophomore	Wichita, KS	Walk-on; transferred to Hutchinson CC
Qua Grant	22	G	6'1"	195	Senior	DeSoto, TX	Graduate transferred to Sam Houston State
Morris Udeze	24	F	6'8"	245	Senior	Houston, TX	Graduate transferred to New Mexico
Joe Pleasant	32	F	6'7"	231	Senior	Overland Park, KS	Transferred to Abilene Christian

=== Incoming transfers ===
Incoming transfers
Name	Number	Pos.	Height	Weight	Year	Hometown	Previous school
Xavier Bell	0	G	6'3"	185	Sophomore	Wichita, KS	Drexel
Colby Rogers	4	G	6'4"	184	Junior	Covington, GA	Siena
Jaron Pierre Jr.	5	G	6'5"	182	Sophomore	New Orleans, LA	Southern Miss
Jaykwon Walton	10	G	6'7"		(redshirt) Junior	Columbus, OH	Shelton State CC
Melvion Flanagan	12	G	5'10"	170	Sophomore	Alexandria	Walk-on; Mississippi Gulf Coast CC
Quincy Ballard	15	C	7'0"	240	Sophomore	Syracuse, NY	Florida State
Shammah Scott	22	G	6'2"	180	Sophomore	Cleveland, OH	Northwest Florida State College
Gus Okafor	23	G/F	6'6"	230	Senior	Baltimore, MD	Southeastern Louisiana
James Rojas	33	F	6'8"	220	(redshirt) Senior	Jamestown, NY	Alabama
Isaiah Poor Bear-Chandler	44	F	6'9"	250	(redshirt) Senior	Omaha, NE	Omaha

=== Recruiting classes ===
==== 2022 recruiting class ====
There were no incoming recruits for the class of 2022.

==== 2023 recruiting class ====
College recruiting information (2023)
Name	Hometown	School	Height	Weight	Commit date
Makhi Myles; SF	Starkville, MS	Starkville High School	6 ft 6 in (1.98 m)	195 lb (88 kg)	Aug 29, 2022
Makhi Myles; SF	Recruit ratings: Rivals: 247Sports: ESPN: (0)				
Overall recruit ranking:
Note: In many cases, Scout, Rivals, 247Sports, On3, and ESPN may conflict in their listings of height and weight.; In these cases, the average was taken. ESPN grades are on a 100-point scale.; Sources: "2023 Team Ranking". Rivals.

== Roster ==
2022–23 Wichita State Shockers men's basketball team
Players
Coaches

Pos.	#	Name	Height	Weight	Year	Previous school	Hometown
G	0	Xavier Bell	6 ft 3 in (1.91 m)	193 lb (88 kg)	So	Drexel	Wichita, Kansas
G	2	Jalen Ricks	6 ft 7 in (2.01 m)	188 lb (85 kg)	RS Fr	Oak Hill Academy	Sherwood, Arkansas
G	3	Craig Porter Jr.	6 ft 2 in (1.88 m)	186 lb (84 kg)	Sr	Vincennes University	Terre Haute, Indiana
G	4	Colby Rogers	6 ft 4 in (1.93 m)	188 lb (85 kg)	Jr	Siena	Covington, Georgia
G	5	Jaron Pierre Jr.	6 ft 5 in (1.96 m)	188 lb (85 kg)	Fr	Southern Miss	New Orleans, Louisiana
G	10	Jaykwon Walton	6 ft 7 in (2.01 m)	206 lb (93 kg)	RS Jr	Shelton State CC	Columbus, Georgia
F	11	Kenny Pohto	6 ft 11 in (2.11 m)	235 lb (107 kg)	So	Sunrise Christian Academy	Stockholm, Sweden
G	12	Melvion Flanagan (W)	5 ft 10 in (1.78 m)	152 lb (69 kg)	So	Mississippi Gulf Coast CC	Alexandria, Louisiana
G	14	Trevor McBride (W)	6 ft 1 in (1.85 m)	150 lb (68 kg)	Fr	Basehor-Linwood HS	Basehor, Kansas
C	15	Quincy Ballard	7 ft 0 in (2.13 m)	244 lb (111 kg)	So	Florida State	Syracuse, New York
F	21	Henry Thengvall (W)	6 ft 6 in (1.98 m)	183 lb (83 kg)	Fr	Kapaun Mt. Carmel Catholic HS	Wichita, Kansas
G	22	Shammah Scott	6 ft 2 in (1.88 m)	180 lb (82 kg)	RS So	Northwest Florida State College	Cleveland, Ohio
F	23	Gus Okafor	6 ft 6 in (1.98 m)	236 lb (107 kg)	Sr	Southeastern Louisiana	Baltimore, Maryland
F	24	Isaac Abidde	6 ft 9 in (2.06 m)	213 lb (97 kg)	RS Fr	Westover HS	Albany, Georgia
F	33	James Rojas	6 ft 8 in (2.03 m)	223 lb (101 kg)	RS Sr	Alabama	Jamestown, New York
F	44	Isaiah Poor Bear-Chandler (W)	6 ft 9 in (2.06 m)	250 lb (113 kg)	RS Sr	Omaha	Omaha, Nebraska

Head coach

- Isaac Brown (Louisiana–Monroe)

Assistant coach(es)

- Butch Pierre (Mississippi State)
- Tyson Waterman (Winthrop)
- Billy Kennedy (Southeastern Louisiana)

Legend

- (C) Team captain
- (S) Suspended
- (I) Ineligible
- (W) Walk-on
- Injured
- Current redshirt

Roster

== Schedule and results ==
Date time, TV	Rank^{#}	Opponent^{#}	Result	Record	High points	High rebounds	High assists	Site (attendance) city, state
Exhibition
November 2, 2022*; 7:00 p.m.		Newman	W 83–52		13 – Porter Jr.	7 – Ballard	5 – Scott	Charles Koch Arena (7,055); Wichita, KS
Non-conference regular season
November 7, 2022*; 7:00 p.m., ESPN+		Central Arkansas	W 79–55	1–0	22 – Porter Jr.	7 – Pierre Jr.	4 – Porter Jr.	Charles Koch Arena (6,954); Wichita, KS
November 12, 2022*; 3:00 p.m., ESPN+		Alcorn State	L 57–66	1–1	13 – Pohto	9 – Porter Jr.	3 – Tied	Charles Koch Arena (8,515); Wichita, KS
November 17, 2022*; 6:00 p.m., ESPN+		at Richmond	W 56–53	2–1	20 – Walton	9 – Porter Jr.	3 – Porter Jr.	Robins Center (5,896); Richmond, VA
November 21, 2022*; 2:00 p.m., CBSSN		vs. Grand Canyon; Hall of Fame Classic semifinals	W 55–43	3–1	14 – Tied	10 – Porter Jr.	3 – Porter Jr.	T-Mobile Center (425); Kansas City, MO
November 22, 2022*; 1:00 p.m., CBSSN		vs. San Francisco; Hall of Fame Classic	L 63–67	3–2	21 – Walton	10 – Walton	6 – Porter Jr.	T-Mobile Center (512); Kansas City, MO
November 26, 2022*; 3:00 p.m., ESPN+		Tarleton State	W 83–71	4–2	27 – Okafor	8 – Pohto	4 – Porter Jr.	Charles Koch Arena (7,299); Wichita, KS
November 29, 2022*; 7:00 p.m., ESPN+		Missouri	L 84–88 ^{OT}	4–3	14 – Tied	10 – Walton	5 – Tied	Charles Koch Arena (7,401); Wichita, KS
December 3, 2022*; 8:00 p.m., ESPNU		at Kansas State	L 50–55	4–4	11 – Porter Jr.	9 – Walton	2 – Okafor	Bramlage Coliseum (8,957); Manhattan, KS
December 10, 2022*; 3:00 p.m., ESPN+		Longwood	W 81–63	5–4	20 – Pierre Jr.	8 – Walton	7 – Porter Jr.	Charles Koch Arena (7,073); Wichita, KS
December 13, 2022*; 7:00 p.m., ESPN+		Mississippi Valley State	W 71–48	6–4	15 – Pierre Jr.	6 – Walton	9 – Porter Jr.	Charles Koch Arena (7,056); Wichita, KS
December 17, 2022*; 8:00 p.m., ESPNU		Oklahoma State	L 49–59	6–5	14 – Porter Jr.	7 – Porter Jr.	1 – Tied	Intrust Bank Arena (7,783); Wichita, KS
December 22, 2022*; 7:00 p.m., ESPN+		Texas Southern	W 65–56	7–5	18 – Pierre Jr.	10 – Walton	3 – Rojas	Charles Koch Arena (6,468); Wichita, KS
AAC Regular Season
December 28, 2022; 6:00 p.m., ESPN+		at UCF	L 45–52	7–6 (0–1)	11 – Flanagan	8 – Walton	3 – Pohto	Addition Financial Arena (4,225); Orlando, FL
December 31, 2022; 3:00 p.m., ESPN+		East Carolina	L 69–79	7–7 (0–2)	21 – Pohto	11 – Pohto	5 – Walton	Charles Koch Arena (7,039); Wichita, KS
January 5, 2023; 8:00 p.m., ESPNU		Cincinnati	L 61–70	7–8 (0–3)	19 – Porter Jr.	7 – Tied	2 – Pohto	Charles Koch Arena (6,876); Wichita, KS
January 8, 2023; 12:00 p.m., ESPN+		at South Florida	W 70–66	8–8 (1–3)	16 – Flanagan	11 – Pohto	5 – Tied	Yuengling Center (2,572); Tampa, FL
January 14, 2023; 3:00 p.m., ESPN+		Tulsa; Rivalry	W 73–69	9–8 (2–3)	19 – Walton	10 – Rojas	5 – Rojas	Charles Koch Arena (7,157); Wichita, KS
January 19, 2023; 6:00 p.m., ESPNU		at Memphis	L 78–88	9–9 (2–4)	19 – Rojas	6 – Porter	5 – Porter	FedExForum (11,238); Memphis, TN
January 22, 2023; 2:00 p.m., ESPN+		at SMU	W 71–69	10–9 (3–4)	18 – Walton	10 – Rojas	3 – Tied	Moody Coliseum (4,308); University Park, TX
January 25, 2023; 8:00 p.m., ESPNU		Tulane	L 90–95 ^{OT}	10–10 (3–5)	24 – Walton	11 – Porter Jr.	8 – Porter Jr.	Charles Koch Arena (7,003); Wichita, KS
January 29, 2023; 11:00 a.m., ESPNU		at East Carolina	W 85–72	11–10 (4–5)	20 – Porter Jr.	8 – Porter Jr.	4 – Tied	Williams Arena (4,191); Greenville, NC
February 2, 2023; 8:00 p.m., ESPN2		No. 3 Houston	L 61–70	11–11 (4–6)	24 – Walton	12 – Pohto	2 – Tied	Charles Koch Arena (7,274); Wichita, KS
February 5, 2023; 2:00 p.m., ESPN+		at Tulsa; Rivalry	W 86–75	12–11 (5–6)	19 – Pierre Jr.	10 – Porter Jr.	7 – Porter Jr.	Reynolds Center (3,754); Tulsa, OK
February 8, 2023; 7:00 p.m., ESPN+		UCF	L 67–72	12–12 (5–7)	19 – Porter Jr.	8 – Pierre Jr.	7 – Porter Jr.	Charles Koch Arena (6,929); Wichita, KS
February 12, 2023; 3:00 p.m., ESPN		SMU	W 91–89 ^{2OT}	13–12 (6–7)	28 – Pohto	8 – Pohto	6 – Porter Jr.	Charles Koch Arena (6,657); Wichita, KS
February 16, 2023; 6:00 p.m., ESPN+		at Temple	W 79–65	14–12 (7–7)	21 – Walton	11 – Rojas	6 – Porter Jr.	Liacouras Center (4,390); Philadelphia, PA
February 23, 2023; 6:00 p.m., ESPN2		Memphis	L 78–83	14–13 (7–8)	19 – Rojas	7 – Porter Jr.	7 – Porter Jr.	Charles Koch Arena (6,966); Wichita, KS
February 26, 2023; 2:00 p.m., ESPNU		at Tulane	W 83–76	15–13 (8–8)	28 – Pierre Jr.	10 – Porter Jr.	10 – Porter Jr.	Devlin Fieldhouse (2,143); New Orleans, LA
March 2, 2023; 6:00 p.m., ESPN2		at No. 1 Houston	L 66–83	15–14 (8–9)	17 – Porter Jr.	7 – Porter Jr.	3 – Tied	Fertitta Center (7,879); Houston, TX
March 5, 2023; 2:00 p.m., ESPN+		South Florida	W 69–49	16–14 (9–9)	24 – Porter Jr.	10 – Pohto	5 – Porter Jr.	Charles Koch Arena (7,532); Wichita, KS
AAC tournament
March 9, 2023; 6:00 p.m., ESPNU	(6)	vs. (11) Tulsa; First round	W 81–63	17–14	13 – Tied	7 – Rojas	11 – Porter Jr.	Dickies Arena; Fort Worth, TX
March 10, 2023; 8:00 p.m., ESPNU	(6)	vs. (3) Tulane; Quarterfinals	L 76–82	17–15	22 – Porter Jr.	9 – Pohto	11 – Porter Jr.	Dickies Arena (6,111); Fort Worth, TX
*Non-conference game. ^{#}Rankings from AP Poll. (#) Tournament seedings in parentheses. All times are in Central Time.
