= 2022–23 Tulane Green Wave men's basketball team =

American college basketball season

2022–23 Tulane Green Wave men's basketball
- Conference: American Athletic Conference
- Record: 20–11 (12–6 AAC)
- Head coach: Ron Hunter (4th season)
- Associate head coach: Ray McCallum
- Assistant coaches: Claude Pardue; Kevin Johnson
- Home arena: Devlin Fieldhouse

2022–23 American Athletic Conference men's basketball standings
	Conf.				Overall
Team	W		L	PCT	W		L	PCT
No. 2 Houston	17	–	1	.944	33	–	4	.892
No. 24 Memphis †	13	–	5	.722	26	–	9	.743
Tulane	12	–	6	.667	20	–	11	.645
Cincinnati	11	–	7	.611	23	–	13	.639
Temple	10	–	8	.556	16	–	16	.500
Wichita State	9	–	9	.500	17	–	15	.531
UCF	8	–	10	.444	19	–	15	.559
South Florida	7	–	11	.389	14	–	18	.438
East Carolina	6	–	12	.333	16	–	17	.485
SMU	5	–	13	.278	10	–	22	.313
Tulsa	1	–	17	.056	5	–	25	.167
† 2023 AAC tournament winner Rankings from AP poll

The 2022–23 Tulane Green Wave men's basketball team represented Tulane University during the 2022–23 NCAA Division I men's basketball season. The Green Wave, led by fourth-year head coach Ron Hunter, played their home games at Devlin Fieldhouse in New Orleans, Louisiana as members of the American Athletic Conference. They finished the season with a record of 20–11, including 12–6 in AAC Play, which placed them 3rd. They defeated Wichita State in the quarterfinals of the AAC tournament before losing in the semifinals to Memphis.

== Previous season ==
The Green Wave went 14–15, 10–8 in AAC Play to finish in 5th place. They defeated Temple in the quarterfinals of the AAC tournament before losing in the semifinals to Houston.

== Offseason ==
=== Departures ===
Name	Number	Pos.	Height	Weight	Year	Hometown	Reason for departure
Sandy Ryan	11	G	6'3"	180	Senior	Los Angeles, CA	Walk-on; graduated
DeVon Baker	20	G	6'2"	190	Senior	Dayton, OH	Graduate transferred to Ohio
Scott Spencer	22	G	6'6"	210	GS senior	Suffolk, VA	Graduated

=== Incoming transfers ===
Name	Num	Pos.	Height	Weight	Year	Hometown	Previous school
Tre' Williams	13	G	6'6"	200	Junior	Dallas, TX	Oregon State

=== 2022 recruiting class ===
College recruiting
Name	Hometown	School	Height	Weight	Commit date
Percy Daniels #67 C	Baton Rouge, LA	Madison Prep Academy	6 ft 9 in (2.06 m)	215 lb (98 kg)	Apr 18, 2022
Percy Daniels #67 C	Recruit ratings: Scout: Rivals: 247Sports: ESPN: (78)				
Overall recruit ranking:
Note: In many cases, Scout, Rivals, 247Sports, On3, and ESPN may conflict in their listings of height and weight.; In these cases, the average was taken. ESPN grades are on a 100-point scale.; Sources: "2022 Team Ranking". Rivals.

=== 2023 recruiting class ===
College recruiting (2023)
Name	Hometown	School	Height	Weight	Commit date
Spencer Elliott; C	Atlanta, GA	St. Pius X High School	6 ft 9 in (2.06 m)	205 lb (93 kg)	Aug 4, 2022
Spencer Elliott; C	Recruit ratings: Scout: Rivals: 247Sports: ESPN: (0)				
Overall recruit ranking:
Note: In many cases, Scout, Rivals, 247Sports, On3, and ESPN may conflict in their listings of height and weight.; In these cases, the average was taken. ESPN grades are on a 100-point scale.; Sources: "2023 Team Ranking". Rivals.

== Roster ==
2022–23 Tulane Green Wave men's basketball team
Players
Coaches

Pos.	#	Name	Height	Weight	Year	Previous school	Hometown
G/F	0	Braelee Albert (W)	6 ft 5 in (1.96 m)	220 lb (100 kg)	Jr	Brentwood School; Vanderbilt	Los Angeles, CA
G	1	Sion James	6 ft 5 in (1.96 m)	205 lb (93 kg)	So	Lanier	Sugar Hill, GA
G	2	Jadan Coleman	6 ft 4 in (1.93 m)	170 lb (77 kg)	So	Bob Jones	Madison, AL
G	3	Jalen Cook	6 ft 0 in (1.83 m)	205 lb (93 kg)	So	Walker; LSU	Walker, LA
F	4	Nobal Days	6 ft 9 in (2.06 m)	220 lb (100 kg)	Jr	Racine Park	Racine, WI
F	10	Oton Jankovic	6 ft 10 in (2.08 m)	215 lb (98 kg)	Jr	Montverde Academy; Vanderbilt	Zagreb, Croatia
C	11	Percy Daniels	6 ft 9 in (2.06 m)	235 lb (107 kg)	Fr	Madison Prep Academy	Baton Rouge, LA
G	13	Tre' Williams	6 ft 6 in (1.98 m)	200 lb (91 kg)	Jr	Wasatch Academy; Oregon State	Dallas, Texas
G	14	Max Bowman (W)	6 ft 0 in (1.83 m)	175 lb (79 kg)	So	JSerra Catholic	Newport Beach, CA
F	15	Quentin Scott	6 ft 7 in (2.01 m)	215 lb (98 kg)	GS	Ellender Memorial; Texas State	Houma, LA
G	23	R. J. McGee	6 ft 5 in (1.96 m)	200 lb (91 kg)	Jr	TaylorMade Academy	Chicago, IL
F	24	Kevin Cross Jr.	6 ft 8 in (2.03 m)	240 lb (109 kg)	Jr	Mills HS; Nebraska	Little Rock, AR
G	25	Jaylen Forbes	6 ft 5 in (1.96 m)	185 lb (84 kg)	Jr	Florence HS; Alabama	Florence, MS
F	33	Tylan Pope	6 ft 6 in (1.98 m)	220 lb (100 kg)	RS So	Franklinton	Franklinton, LA
G	34	Jake Shapiro (W)	6 ft 1 in (1.85 m)	—	Fr	Windward School	Los Angeles, CA

Head coach

- Ron Hunter (Miami (OH))

Assistant coach(es)

- Ray McCallum (Ball State)
- Claude Pardue (Emory)
- Kevin Johnson (Texas–Pan American)

Legend

- (C) Team captain
- (S) Suspended
- (I) Ineligible
- (W) Walk-on
- Injured
- Current redshirt

Roster

== Schedule and results ==
Date time, TV	Rank^{#}	Opponent^{#}	Result	Record	High points	High rebounds	High assists	Site (attendance) city, state
Exhibition
November 2, 2022*; 6:00 p.m.		Spring Hill	W 81–53		23 – Forbes	6 – Tied	5 – Cross	Devlin Fieldhouse (607); New Orleans, LA
Non-conference regular season
November 7, 2022*; 7:30 p.m., ESPN+		UMBC	W 89–67	1–0	21 – Tied	8 – McGee	4 – Tied	Devlin Fieldhouse (885); New Orleans, LA
November 11, 2022*; 6:00 p.m., ESPN+		McNeese State	W 75–58	2–0	25 – Holloway	7 – Cross	6 – James	Devlin Fieldhouse (1,363); New Orleans, LA
November 16, 2022*; 6:00 p.m., ESPN+		Charleston Southern	W 99–79	3–0	23 – Cook	10 – Cross	7 – James	Devlin Fieldhouse; New Orleans, LA
November 21, 2022*; 4:00 p.m., FloSports		vs. Nevada; Cayman Islands Classic quarterfinals	L 66–75	3–1	24 – Forbes	7 – Forbes	6 – James	John Gray Gymnasium; George Town, Cayman Islands
November 22, 2022*; 4:00 p.m., FloSports		vs. Rhode Island; Cayman Islands Classic consolation 2nd round	W 78–75	4–1	22 – Cross	6 – Holloway	7 – Cross	John Gray Gymnasium; George Town, Cayman Islands
November 23, 2022*; 12:30 p.m., FloSports		vs. Western Kentucky; Cayman Islands Classic 5th place game	L 65–71	4–2	17 – Cross	6 – Cross	6 – Cross	John Gray Gymnasium; George Town, Cayman Islands
November 28, 2022*; 6:00 p.m., ESPN+		Louisiana–Monroe	W 75–60	5–2	26 – Forbes	9 – Cross	8 – Cook	Devlin Fieldhouse; New Orleans, LA
December 3, 2022*; 10:30 a.m., ESPN+		Fordham	L 90–95	5–3	25 – Tied	9 – Cross	6 – James	Devlin Fieldhouse (1,383); New Orleans, LA
December 6, 2022*; 6:00 p.m., ESPN+		Bryant	Postponed due to health and safety protocols					Devlin Fieldhouse; New Orleans, LA
December 10, 2022*; 10:30 a.m.		vs. Buffalo; Holiday Hoopsgiving	W 88–63	6–3	21 – Cook	8 – James	7 – Cook	State Farm Arena; Atlanta, GA
December 17, 2022*; 2:30 p.m.		vs. George Mason; Legends of Basketball Showcase	L 56–62	6–4	12 – Forbes	7 – Cross	6 – Cook	United Center; Chicago, IL
December 21, 2022*; 7:00 p.m., ESPN+		Mississippi Valley State	W 84–63	7–4	27 – Cook	7 – Pope	2 – Tied	Devlin Fieldhouse; New Orleans, LA
AAC Regular Season
December 29, 2022; 8:00 p.m., ESPN2		at Cincinnati	L 77–88	7–5 (0–1)	22 – Cross	8 – Cross	5 – Cross	Fifth Third Arena (9,484); Cincinnati, OH
January 1, 2023; 4:00 p.m., ESPN		Memphis	W 96–89	8–5 (1–1)	30 – James	6 – Tied	7 – James	Devlin Fieldhouse (1,548); New Orleans, LA
January 4, 2023; 6:00 p.m., ESPN+		Tulsa	W 93–77	9–5 (2–1)	24 – Cook	5 – Tied	7 – Cook	Devlin Fieldhouse (973); New Orleans, LA
January 7, 2023; 1:00 p.m., ESPN+		at Temple	W 87–76	10–5 (3–1)	25 – Forbes	10 – Cross	5 – Cross	Liacouras Center (4,502); Philadelphia, PA
January 11, 2023; 7:00 p.m., ESPN+		at SMU	W 97–88	11–5 (4–1)	31 – Forbes	8 – James	8 – Cook	Moody Coliseum (3,291); University Park, TX
January 14, 2023; 1:00 p.m., ESPN+		UCF	W 77–69	12–5 (5–1)	27 – Forbes	8 – Cross	7 – Cross	Devlin Fieldhouse (1,634); New Orleans, LA
January 17, 2023; 6:00 p.m., ESPN+		No. 1 Houston	L 60–80	12–6 (5–2)	23 – Forbes	9 – James	3 – Cross	Devlin Fieldhouse (3,621); New Orleans, LA
January 21, 2023; 7:00 p.m., ESPN+		at Tulsa	L 79–81 ^{OT}	12–7 (5–3)	23 – Cook	9 – James	6 – Cook	Reynolds Center (7,071); Tulsa, OK
January 25, 2023; 8:00 p.m., ESPNU		at Wichita State	W 95–90 ^{OT}	13–7 (6–3)	25 – Forbes	9 – Cook	6 – Cook	Charles Koch Arena (7,003); Wichita, KS
February 1, 2023; 8:00 p.m., ESPNU		SMU	W 74–52	14–7 (7–3)	22 – Cook	8 – Forbes	5 – Cook	Devlin Fieldhouse (1,937); New Orleans, LA
February 4, 2023; 1:00 p.m., ESPNU		at Memphis	W 90–89 ^{OT}	15–7 (8–3)	25 – Cook	7 – Forbes	5 – Cross	FedExForum (11,802); Memphis, TN
February 7, 2023; 6:00 p.m., ESPN+		Cincinnati	W 101–94 ^{OT}	16–7 (9–3)	27 – Tied	15 – Cross	14 – Cook	Devlin Fieldhouse (2,328); New Orleans, LA
February 18, 2023; 7:00 p.m., ESPNU		at South Florida	W 84–66	17–7 (10–3)	30 – Cook	13 – Cross	7 – Cook	Yuengling Center (7,014); Tampa, FL
February 22, 2023; 8:00 p.m., ESPNU		at No. 1 Houston	L 59–89	17–8 (10–4)	23 – Cook	8 – Pope	3 – Cook	Fertitta Center (7,763); Houston, TX
February 26, 2023; 2:00 p.m., ESPNU		Wichita State	L 76–83	17–9 (10–5)	30 – Cook	7 – Forbes	6 – Cross	Devlin Fieldhouse (2,143); New Orleans, LA
March 1, 2023; 8:00 p.m., ESPNU		at East Carolina	L 68–83	17–10 (10–6)	23 – Forbes	10 – Holloway	4 – James	Williams Arena (3,817); Greenville, NC
March 3, 2023; 7:00 p.m., ESPN+		East Carolina; Rescheduled from Feb. 11	W 81–78	18–10 (11–6)	25 – Forbes	8 – Cross	8 – Cook	Devlin Fieldhouse; New Orleans, LA
March 5, 2023; 1:00 p.m., ESPN+		Temple	W 83–82	19–10 (12–6)	24 – Cook	9 – Cross	6 – Cross	Devlin Fieldhouse; New Orleans, LA
AAC tournament
March 10, 2023; 8:00 p.m., ESPNU	(3)	vs. (6) Wichita State; Quarterfinals	W 82–76	20–10	24 – Cross	13 – Cross	8 – James	Dickies Arena (6,111); Fort Worth, TX
March 11, 2023; 4:00 p.m., ESPN2	(3)	vs. (2) Memphis; Semifinals	L 54–94	20–11	15 – Cook	13 – Pope	5 – Cross	Dickies Arena (6,943); Fort Worth, TX
*Non-conference game. ^{#}Rankings from AP Poll. (#) Tournament seedings in parentheses. All times are in Central Time.
