= 2022–23 SMU Mustangs men's basketball team =

American college basketball season

2022–23 SMU Mustangs men's basketball
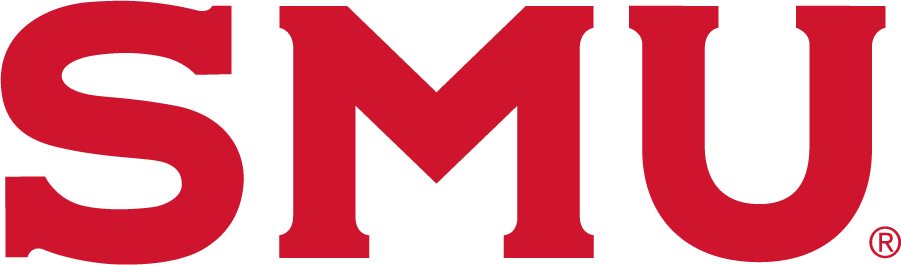
- Conference: American Athletic Conference
- Record: 10–22 (5–13 AAC)
- Head coach: Rob Lanier (1st season)
- Assistant coaches: Chris Kreider; Cliff Warren; Josten Crow
- Home arena: Moody Coliseum

2022–23 American Athletic Conference men's basketball standings
	Conf.				Overall
Team	W		L	PCT	W		L	PCT
No. 2 Houston	17	–	1	.944	33	–	4	.892
No. 24 Memphis †	13	–	5	.722	26	–	9	.743
Tulane	12	–	6	.667	20	–	11	.645
Cincinnati	11	–	7	.611	23	–	13	.639
Temple	10	–	8	.556	16	–	16	.500
Wichita State	9	–	9	.500	17	–	15	.531
UCF	8	–	10	.444	19	–	15	.559
South Florida	7	–	11	.389	14	–	18	.438
East Carolina	6	–	12	.333	16	–	17	.485
SMU	5	–	13	.278	10	–	22	.313
Tulsa	1	–	17	.056	5	–	25	.167
† 2023 AAC tournament winner Rankings from AP poll

The 2022–23 SMU Mustangs men's basketball team represented Southern Methodist University during the 2022–23 NCAA Division I men's basketball season. The Mustangs were led by first-year head coach Rob Lanier and played their home games at Moody Coliseum on their campus in University Park, Texas as members of the American Athletic Conference. They finished the season 10–21, 5–13 in AAC play to finish in tenth place. They were defeated by UCF in the first round of the AAC tournament.

== Previous season ==
The Mustangs finished the 2021–22 season 24–9, 13–4 in AAC play to finish in second place. They defeated Tulsa in the quarterfinals of the AAC tournament before losing to Memphis in the semifinals. They received an at-large bid to the National Invitation Tournament as a No. 1 seed. They defeated Nichols in the first round before losing to Washington State in the second round.

On March 22, 2022, head coach Tim Jankovich announced his retirement from coaching. On March 27, the school named Georgia State head coach Rob Lanier the team's new head coach.

== Offseason ==
=== Departures ===
Name	Number	Pos.	Height	Weight	Year	Hometown	Reason for departure
Kendric Davis	3	G	6'0"	180	Senior	Houston, TX	Graduate transferred to Memphis
Tyler Lundblade	4	G	6'5"	185	Freshman	Dallas, TX	Transferred to TCU
Emmanuel Bandoumel	5	G	6'4"	180	Senior	Quebec City, QC	Graduate transferred to Nebraska
Jahmar Young Jr.	21	F	6'9"	215	RS Junior	Oak Cliff, TX	Transferred to Memphis
Isiah Jasey	22	F	6'10"	250	GS Senior	Killeen, TX	Graduated
Michael Weathers	23	G	6'3"	175	RS Senior	Roeland Park, KS	Graduated
Tristan Clark	25	F	6'10"	245	Senior	San Antonio, TX	Graduated
Marcus Weathers	50	F	6'5"	215	GS Senior	Roeland Park, KS	Graduated

=== Incoming transfers ===
Name	Num	Pos.	Height	Weight	Year	Hometown	Previous school
Jefferson Koulibaly	0	G	6'3"	185	RS Sophomore	Montreal, QC	Washington State
Samuell Williamson	11	F	6'7"	210	Senior	Rockwall, TX	Louisville
Mo Njie	13	C	6'10"	245	Sophomore	Centerville, OH	Eastern Michigan
Xavier Foster	20	C	7'0"	228	Sophomore	Oskaloosa, IA	Iowa State
Keon Ambrose-Hylton	22	F	6'8"	215	Junior	Toronto, ON	Alabama
Efe Odigie	23	F	6'9"	240	Senior	Houston, TX	Troy
Emory Lanuier	24	G	6'3"	180	Junior	Atlanta, GA	Walk-on; Davidson
Jackson Young	32	G	6'2"	190	RS Sophomore	Kerrville, TX	Walk-on; Hawaii Pacific

=== 2022 Recruiting class ===
There were no incoming recruits for the class of 2022.

== Roster ==
2022–23 SMU Mustangs men's basketball team
Players
Coaches

Pos.	#	Name	Height	Weight	Year	Previous school	Hometown
G	0	Jefferson Koulibaly	6 ft 3 in (1.91 m)	185 lb (84 kg)	RS So	Washington State	Montreal, Quebec
G	1	Zhuric Phelps	6 ft 3 in (1.91 m)	175 lb (79 kg)	So	Duncanville High School	Midland, Texas
G	2	Jalen Smith	6 ft 4 in (1.93 m)	175 lb (79 kg)	So	Oak Ridge High School	Orlando, Florida
F	3	Stefan Todorović	6 ft 8 in (2.03 m)	190 lb (86 kg)	So	Prolific Prep	Belgrade, Serbia
G	5	Ricardo Wright	6 ft 4 in (1.93 m)	185 lb (84 kg)	Jr	Marist	Eustis, Florida
G	10	Zach Nutall	6 ft 3 in (1.91 m)	185 lb (84 kg)	Sr	Sam Houston State	Bryan, Texas
F	11	Samuell Williamson	6 ft 7 in (2.01 m)	210 lb (95 kg)	Sr	Louisville	Rockwall, Texas
C	13	Mo Njie	6 ft 10 in (2.08 m)	245 lb (111 kg)	So	Eastern Michigan	Centerville, Ohio
G	15	Darius McBride	6 ft 4 in (1.93 m)	190 lb (86 kg)	RS Jr	Westlake High School	Cedar Park, Texas
F	20	Xavier Foster	7 ft 0 in (2.13 m)	230 lb (104 kg)	So	Iowa State	Oskaloosa, Iowa
F	22	Keon Ambrose-Hylton	6 ft 8 in (2.03 m)	215 lb (98 kg)	Jr	Alabama	Toronto, Ontario
F	23	Efe Odigie	6 ft 9 in (2.06 m)	240 lb (109 kg)	Sr	Troy	Houston, Texas
G	24	Emory Lanier (W)	6 ft 3 in (1.91 m)	180 lb (82 kg)	Jr	Davidson	Atlanta, Georgia
G	31	Trey Utter (W)	5 ft 6 in (1.68 m)	160 lb (73 kg)	Fr	Argyle High School	Argyle, Texas
G	32	Jackson Young (W)	5 ft 2 in (1.57 m)	190 lb (86 kg)	So	Hawaii Pacific	Kerrville, Texas
F	33	Franklin Agunanne	6 ft 9 in (2.06 m)	245 lb (111 kg)	RS Sr	Loyola–Chicago	Abuja, Nigeria

Head coach

- Rob Lanier (St. Bonaventure)

Assistant coach(es)

- Chris Kreider (Lebanon Valley)
- Cliff Warren (Mount St. Mary's)
- Josten Crow (Sam Houston State)

Legend

- (C) Team captain
- (S) Suspended
- (I) Ineligible
- (W) Walk-on
- Injured
- Current redshirt

Roster

== Schedule and results ==
Date time, TV	Rank^{#}	Opponent^{#}	Result	Record	High points	High rebounds	High assists	Site (attendance) city, state
Exhibition
October 29, 2022*; 7:00 p.m.		Paul Quinn	W 80–66		27 – Phelps	10 – Phelps	5 – Phelps	Moody Coliseum (2,522); University Park, TX
Non-conference regular season
November 7, 2022*; 7:00 p.m., ESPN+		Texas A&M–Commerce	W 77–60	1–0	28 – Phelps	11 – Williamson	3 – Tied	Moody Coliseum (3,276); University Park, TX
November 11, 2022*; 6:00 p.m., ESPN+/BSOH		at No. 24 Dayton	L 62–74	1–1	20 – Nutall	11 – Odigie	3 – Odigie	UD Arena (13,407); Dayton, OH
November 15, 2022*; 7:00 p.m., ESPN+		New Mexico	L 63–84	1–2	16 – Phelps	9 – Odigie	3 – Tied	Moody Coliseum (3,662); University Park, TX
November 19, 2022*; 2:00 p.m., ESPN+		Evansville	W 55–47	2–2	15 – Phelps	11 – Odigie	3 – Nutall	Moody Coliseum (3,397); University Park, TX
November 22, 2022*; 7:30 p.m., ESPN+		Louisiana	L 72–76 ^{OT}	2–3	21 – Phelps	12 – Williamson	5 – Phelps	Moody Coliseum (3,194); University Park, TX
November 27, 2022*; 2:00 p.m., ESPN+		Lamar	W 75–50	3–3	19 – Phelps	7 – Todorović	7 – Nutall	Moody Coliseum (2,884); University Park, TX
November 30, 2022*; 7:00 p.m., SECN+/ESPN+		at Texas A&M	L 64–83	3–4	23 – Phelps	9 – Odigie	3 – Williamson	Reed Arena (6,956); College Station, TX
December 3, 2022*; 8:00 p.m., ESPN+		Jackson State	L 68–69	3–5	23 – Phelps	8 – Odigie	7 – Williamson	Moody Coliseum (3,632); University Park, TX
December 7, 2022*; 8:00 p.m., ESPNU		Arizona State	L 57–75	3–6	19 – Phelps	12 – Williamson	2 – Tied	Moody Coliseum (4,556); University Park, TX
December 10, 2022*; 9:00 p.m., ESPN2		vs. No. 24 TCU	L 75–83	3–7	20 – Nutall	11 – Odigie	3 – Phelps	Dickies Arena (5,439); Fort Worth, TX
December 22, 2022*; 2:00 p.m., ESPNU		vs. Iona; Diamond Head Classic Quarterfinals	W 85–81	4–7	24 – Nutall	8 – Williamson	4 – Nutall	Stan Sheriff Center; Honolulu, HI
December 23, 2022*; 6:00 p.m., ESPN2		vs. Utah State; Diamond Head Classic Semifinals	W 77–74	5–7	19 – Phelps	8 – Phelps	4 – Phelps	Stan Sheriff Center (4,070); Honolulu, HI
December 25, 2022*; 7:30 p.m., ESPN2		at Hawai'i; Diamond Head Classic Championship Game	L 57–58	5–8	20 – Phelps	10 – Williamson	4 – Nutall	Stan Sheriff Center (5,279); Honolulu, HI
AAC regular season
January 1, 2023; 2:00 p.m., ESPNU		Tulsa	W 92–67	6–8 (1–0)	17 – Tied	7 – Williamson	7 – Smith	Moody Coliseum (3,385); University Park, TX
January 5, 2023; 6:00 p.m., ESPN2		at No. 2 Houston; Rivalry	L 53–87	6–9 (1–1)	14 – Odigie	5 – Tied	3 – Koulibaly	Fertitta Center (7,478); Houston, TX
January 8, 2023; 1:00 p.m., ESPNU		at UCF	L 53–85	6–10 (1–2)	13 – Wright	4 – Ambrose-Hylton	2 – Tied	Addition Financial Arena (4,576); Orlando, FL
January 11, 2023; 7:00 p.m., ESPN+		Tulane	L 88–97	6–11 (1–3)	27 – Todorović	11 – Williamson	8 – Tied	Moody Coliseum (3,291); University Park, TX
January 14, 2023; 3:00 p.m., ESPNU		Cincinnati	L 52–54	6–12 (1–4)	13 – Nutall	13 – Williamson	3 – Tied	Moody Coliseum (3,817); University Park, TX
January 18, 2023; 7:00 p.m., ESPN+		at Tulsa	W 79–76 ^{OT}	7–12 (2–4)	22 – Odigie	11 – Williamson	5 – Nutall	Reynolds Center (3,047); Tulsa, OK
January 22, 2023; 2:00 p.m., ESPN+		Wichita State	L 69–71	7–13 (2–5)	17 – Nutall	11 – Odigie	5 – Tied	Moody Coliseum (4,308); University Park, TX
January 26, 2023; 6:00 p.m., ESPN2		at Memphis	L 84–99	7–14 (2–6)	20 – Phelps	9 – Odigie	5 – Smith	FedExForum (10,489); Memphis, TN
January 29, 2023; 3:00 p.m., ESPNU		South Florida	W 82–80	8–14 (3–6)	17 – Phelps	11 – Williamson	7 – Phelps	Moody Coliseum (3,608); University Park, TX
February 1, 2023; 8:00 p.m., ESPNU		at Tulane	L 52–74	8–15 (3–7)	23 – Nutall	6 – Tied	5 – Tied	Devlin Fieldhouse (1,937); New Orleans, LA
February 4, 2023; 3:00 p.m., ESPN+		at East Carolina	L 72–77	8–16 (3–8)	23 – Phelps	9 – Odigie	3 – Tied	Williams Arena (4,365); Greenville, NC
February 8, 2023; 7:00 p.m., ESPN+		Temple	W 72–71	9–16 (4–8)	19 – Phelps	11 – Odigie	5 – Phelps	Moody Coliseum (4,476); University Park, TX
February 12, 2023; 3:00 p.m., ESPN		at Wichita State	L 89–91 ^{2OT}	9–17 (4–9)	26 – Phelps	10 – Williamson	5 – Tied	Charles Koch Arena (6,657); Wichita, KS
February 16, 2023; 6:00 p.m., ESPN2		No. 2 Houston; Rivalry	L 65–80	9–18 (4–10)	22 – Phelps	6 – Phelps	5 – Phelps	Moody Coliseum (6,278); University Park, TX
February 19, 2023; 2:00 p.m., ESPN+		East Carolina	W 86–70	10–18 (5–10)	20 – Williamson	9 – Tied	10 – Phelps	Moody Coliseum (4,561); University Park, TX
February 25, 2023; 6:00 p.m., ESPN+		at South Florida	L 67–71	10–19 (5–11)	22 – Phelps	10 – Odigie	3 – Odigie	Yuengling Center (3,862); Tampa, FL
March 2, 2023; 8:00 p.m., ESPN2		Memphis	L 62–81	10–20 (5–12)	15 – Nutall	11 – Williamson	3 – Smith	Moody Coliseum (4,332); University Park, TX
March 5, 2023; 1:00 p.m., ESPN+		at Cincinnati	L 74–97	10–21 (5–13)	17 – Phelps	6 – Njie	3 – Smith	Fifth Third Arena (11,068); Cincinnati, OH
AAC tournament
March 9, 2023; 1:30 p.m., ESPNU	(10)	vs. (7) UCF; First round	L 70–76	10–22	21 – Phelps	11 – Williamson	7 – Phelps	Dickies Arena (5,986); Fort Worth, TX
*Non-conference game. ^{#}Rankings from AP Poll. (#) Tournament seedings in parentheses. All times are in Central Time.
