= 2023 American Athletic Conference men's basketball tournament =

U.S. college basketball tournament

- Classification: Division I
- Season: 2022–23
- Teams: 11
- Site: Dickies Arena; Fort Worth, Texas
- Champions: Memphis (1st title)
- Winning coach: Penny Hardaway (1st title)
- MVP: Kendric Davis (Memphis)
- Television: ESPN, ESPN2, ESPNU

2022–23 American Athletic Conference men's basketball standings
	Conf.				Overall
Team	W		L	PCT	W		L	PCT
No. 2 Houston	17	–	1	.944	33	–	4	.892
No. 24 Memphis †	13	–	5	.722	26	–	9	.743
Tulane	12	–	6	.667	20	–	11	.645
Cincinnati	11	–	7	.611	23	–	13	.639
Temple	10	–	8	.556	16	–	16	.500
Wichita State	9	–	9	.500	17	–	15	.531
UCF	8	–	10	.444	19	–	15	.559
South Florida	7	–	11	.389	14	–	18	.438
East Carolina	6	–	12	.333	16	–	17	.485
SMU	5	–	13	.278	10	–	22	.313
Tulsa	1	–	17	.056	5	–	25	.167
† 2023 AAC tournament winner Rankings from AP poll

The 2023 American Athletic Conference men's basketball tournament was held March 9–12, 2023, at Dickies Arena in Fort Worth, Texas. All games of the tournament were televised by ESPN Inc. The winner of the tournament, the Memphis Tigers, received the conference's automatic bid to the 2023 NCAA tournament.

== Seeds ==
Teams were seeded by conference record. The top five teams received byes to the quarterfinals.

Tiebreakers were applied as needed to properly seed the teams.

Seed	School	Conference Record	Tiebreaker
1	Houston	17–1	
2	Memphis	13–5	
3	Tulane	12–6	
4	Cincinnati	11–7	
5	Temple	10–8	
6	Wichita State	9–9	
7	UCF	8–10	
8	South Florida	7–11	
9	East Carolina	6–12	
10	SMU	5–13	
11	Tulsa	1–17	

== Schedule ==
Game	Time	Matchup	Score	Television	Attendance
First Round – March 9, 2023
1	11:30 AM	No. 8 South Florida vs. No. 9 East Carolina	58–73	ESPNU	
2	1:30 PM	No. 7 UCF vs. No. 10 SMU	76–70	ESPNU	5,986
3	6:00 PM	No. 6 Wichita State vs. No. 11 Tulsa	81–63	ESPNU	
Quarterfinals – March 10, 2023
4	12:00 PM	No. 1 Houston vs. No. 9 East Carolina	60–46	ESPN2	
5	2:00 PM	No. 4 Cincinnati vs. No. 5 Temple	84–54	ESPN2	
6	6:00 PM	No. 2 Memphis vs. No. 7 UCF	81–76	ESPNU	
7	8:00 PM	No. 3 Tulane vs. No. 6 Wichita State	82–76	ESPNU	6,111
Semifinals – March 11, 2023
8	2:00 PM	No. 1 Houston vs. No. 4 Cincinnati	69–48	ESPN2	
9	4:00 PM	No. 2 Memphis vs. No. 3 Tulane	94–54	ESPN2	6,943
Championship – March 12, 2023
10	2:15 PM	No. 1 Houston vs. No. 2 Memphis	65–75	ESPN	
*Game times in CT. ()-Rankings denote tournament seeding.

== Bracket ==
* – Denotes overtime period

First round Thursday, March 9
8	South Florida	58
9	East Carolina	73
7	UCF	76
10	SMU	70
6	Wichita State	81
11	Tulsa	63

Quarterfinals; Friday, March 10
1	Houston	60
9	East Carolina	46
4	Cincinnati	84
5	Temple	54
2	Memphis	81
7	UCF	76
3	Tulane	82
6	Wichita State	76

Semifinals; Saturday, March 11
1	Houston	69
4	Cincinnati	48
2	Memphis	94
3	Tulane	54

Championship; Sunday, March 12
1	Houston	65
2	Memphis	75

== Game summaries ==
=== First round ===
ESPNU

March 9, 2023
11:30 AM

Report

No. 8 South Florida 58, No. 9 East Carolina 73
Scoring by half: 33–41, 25–32
Pts: Harris (26); Rebs: Tchewa (11); Asts: Tchewa (3)	Pts: Tied (22); Rebs: Felton (6); Asts: Walker (10)

Dickies Arena
Ft. Worth, Texas
Referees: Jason Baker, Garrick Shannon, Josue Nieves

ESPNU

March 9, 2023
1:30 PM

Report

No. 7 UCF 76, No. 10 SMU 70
Scoring by half: 28–36, 48–34
Pts: Kelly (21); Rebs: Hendricks (8); Asts: Johnson (5)	Pts: Phelps (21); Rebs: Williamson (11); Asts: Phelps (7)

Dickies Arena
Ft. Worth, Texas
Attendance: 5,986
Referees: Anthony Jordan, Robert Felder, Jim Rife

ESPNU

March 9, 2023
6:00 PM

Report

No. 6 Wichita State 81, No. 11 Tulsa 63
Scoring by half: 30–25, 51–38
Pts: Tied (13); Rebs: Rojas (7); Asts: Porter Jr. (11)	Pts: Dalger (21); Rebs: Selebangue (7); Asts: Betson (7)

Dickies Arena
Ft. Worth, Texas
Referees: Patrick Evans, Sean Casady, Bill Jacobson

=== Quarterfinals ===
ESPN2

March 10, 2023
12:00 PM

Report

No. 1 Houston 60, No. 9 East Carolina 46
Scoring by half: 23–21, 37–25
Pts: Sasser (30); Rebs: Roberts (12); Asts: Tied (4)	Pts: Ausar (18); Rebs: Ausar (19); Asts: Walker (6)

Dickies Arena
Ft. Worth, Texas
Referees: Tony Greene, Patrick Evans, Garrick Shannon

ESPN2

March 10, 2023
2:00 PM

Report

No. 4 Cincinnati 84, No. 5 Temple 54
Scoring by half: 37–27, 47–27
Pts: Nolley II (22); Rebs: Oguama (12); Asts: Adams-Woods (5)	Pts: Tied (12); Rebs: Hicks (8); Asts: Miller (5)

Dickies Arena
Ft. Worth, Texas
Referees: Mike Nance, Jason Baker, Landon Brandes

ESPNU

March 10, 2023
6:00 PM

Report

No. 2 Memphis 81, No. 7 UCF 76
Scoring by half: 40–30, 41–46
Pts: Williams (35); Rebs: Williams (13); Asts: Davis (7)	Pts: Kelly (28); Rebs: Hendricks (9); Asts: Johnson (4)

Dickies Arena
Ft. Worth, Texas
Referees: Anthony Jordan, Wil Howard, Josue Nieves

ESPNU

March 10, 2023
8:00 PM

Report

No. 3 Tulane 82, No. 6 Wichita State 76
Scoring by half: 46–40, 36–36
Pts: Cross (24); Rebs: Cross (13); Asts: James (8)	Pts: Porter Jr. (22); Rebs: Pohto (9); Asts: Porter Jr. (11)

Dickies Arena
Ft. Worth, Texas
Attendance: 6,111
Referees: Chuck Jones, Rob Rorke, Robert Felder

=== Semifinals ===
ESPN2

March 11, 2023
2:00 PM

Report

No. 1 Houston 69, No. 4 Cincinnati 48
Scoring by half: 38–23, 31–25
Pts: Tied (16); Rebs: Tied (8); Asts: Shead (9)	Pts: Nolley II (14); Rebs: Oguama (9); Asts: DeJulius (5)

Dickies Arena
Ft. Worth, Texas
Referees: Wil Howard, Mike Nance, Owen Shortt

ESPN2

March 11, 2023
4:00 PM

Report

No. 2 Memphis 94, No. 3 Tulane 54
Scoring by half: 42–17, 52–37
Pts: Williams (27); Rebs: Williams (11); Asts: Davis (6)	Pts: Cook (15); Rebs: Pope (13); Asts: Cross (5)

Dickies Arena
Ft. Worth, Texas
Attendance: 6,943
Referees: Chuck Jones, Olandis Poole, Todd Austin

=== Championship game ===
ESPN

March 12, 2023
2:15 PM

Report

No. 1 Houston 65, No. 2 Memphis 75
Scoring by half: 31–46, 34–29
Pts: Shead (16); Rebs: Roberts (20); Asts: Shead (4)	Pts: Davis (31); Rebs: Williams (13); Asts: Lomax (4)

Dickies Arena
Ft. Worth, Texas
Referees: Doug Shows, Joe Lindsay, Pat Adams

*Game times: CT

== See also ==
- 2023 American Athletic Conference women's basketball tournament
- American Athletic Conference men's basketball tournament
- American Athletic Conference
