= 2023–24 Cincinnati Bearcats men's basketball team =

American college basketball season

2023–24 Cincinnati Bearcats men's basketball

NIT, Quarterfinals
- Conference: Big 12 Conference
- Record: 22–15 (7–11 Big 12)
- Head coach: Wes Miller (3rd season)
- Associate head coach: Chad Dollar (3rd season)
- Assistant coaches: Andre Morgan (3rd season); Drew Adams (1st season); Josh Loeffler (1st season); Jake Thelen (1st season)
- Home arena: Fifth Third Arena

2023–24 Big 12 men's basketball standings
	Conf.				Overall
Team	W		L	PCT	W		L	PCT
No. 3т Houston	15	–	3	.833	32	–	5	.865
No. 8 Iowa State †	13	–	5	.722	29	–	8	.784
No. 16 Baylor	11	–	7	.611	24	–	11	.686
Texas Tech	11	–	7	.611	23	–	11	.676
BYU	10	–	8	.556	23	–	11	.676
No. 19 Kansas	10	–	8	.556	23	–	11	.676
Texas	9	–	9	.500	21	–	13	.618
TCU	9	–	9	.500	21	–	13	.618
Oklahoma	8	–	10	.444	20	–	12	.625
Kansas State	8	–	10	.444	19	–	15	.559
Cincinnati	7	–	11	.389	22	–	15	.595
UCF	7	–	11	.389	17	–	16	.515
Oklahoma State	4	–	14	.222	12	–	20	.375
West Virginia	4	–	14	.222	9	–	23	.281
† 2024 Big 12 tournament winner Rankings from AP poll

The 2023–24 Cincinnati Bearcats men's basketball team represented the University of Cincinnati in the 2023–24 NCAA Division I men's basketball season. They were led by third-year head coach Wes Miller. The team played their home games at Fifth Third Arena as first-year members of the Big 12 Conference. They finished the season 22–15, 7–11 in Big 12 play to finish in a tie for 11th place. As the No 12 seed in the Big 12 tournament, they defeated West Virginia and Kansas before losing to Baylor in the quarterfinals. They received an at-large bid to the National Invitation Tournament. As a No. 2 seed, they defeated San Francisco and Bradley before losing to Indiana State in the quarterfinals.

The season was the first for the Bearcats in the Big 12, as they had left the American Athletic Conference to join the Big 12 in July 2023.

== Previous season ==
The Bearcats finished the 2022–23 season 23–13, 11–7 in AAC play to finish in fourth place. They defeated Temple before losing to Houston in the quarterfinals of the AAC tournament. The Bearcats received an at-large bid to the NIT, where they defeated Virginia Tech and Hofstra before falling to Utah Valley in the quarterfinals.

== Offseason ==
=== Player departures ===
Cincinnati departing players
Name	Pos.	Height	Weight	Year	Hometown	Reason
Kalu Ezikpe	F	6' 8"	240	Graduate student	Lawrenceville, GA	Completed college eligibility (Note: Ezikpe and Phinese both were graduate transfers in the 2022–23 season, with Ezikpe having graduated from Old Dominion and Phinese from Indiana.)
Landers Nolley II	G	6' 7"	208	Graduate student	Atlanta, GA	Play professionally
Mika Adams-Woods	G	6' 3"	180	Graduate student	Syracuse, NY	Transferred to St. Bonaventure
David DeJulius	G	6' 0"	200	Graduate student	Detroit, MI	Completed college eligibility
Rob Phinisee	G	6' 1"	187	Graduate student	Lafayette, IN	Completed college eligibility
Jeremiah Davenport	G	6' 7"	215	Graduate student	Cincinnati, OH	Transferred to Arkansas
Jarrett Hensley	F	6' 8"	220	Junior	Merriam, KS	Transferred to Southern Illinois

=== Incoming transfers ===
Cincinnati incoming transfers
Name	Pos.	Height	Weight	Year	Hometown	Previous school	Remaining eligibility
DaVeon Thomas	G	6' 0"	190	Junior	Columbia, SC	Kilgore College	Two years
Jamille Reynolds	F	6' 10"	285	Senior	Saint Petersburg, FL	Temple	Two years
CJ Fredrick	G	6' 3"	185	Graduate student	Cincinnati, OH	Kentucky	Two years
Simas Lukošius	G	6' 8"	225	Junior	Kaunas, Lithuania	Butler	Two years
Aziz Bandaogo	F	7' 0"	230	Senior	Dakar, Senegal	Utah Valley	Two years

=== Class of 2023 ===
College recruiting
Name	Hometown	School	Height	Weight	Commit date
Rayvon Griffith; SG	Cincinnati, OH	AZ Compass Prep	6 ft 7 in (2.01 m)	180 lb (82 kg)	May 1, 2022
Rayvon Griffith; SG	Recruit ratings: Rivals: 247Sports: ESPN: (83)				
Jizzle James; PG	Orlando, FL	Olympia High School	6 ft 1 in (1.85 m)	180 lb (82 kg)	October 4, 2022
Jizzle James; PG	Recruit ratings: Rivals: 247Sports: ESPN: (84)				
Overall recruit ranking:
Note: In many cases, Scout, Rivals, 247Sports, On3, and ESPN may conflict in their listings of height and weight.; In these cases, the average was taken. ESPN grades are on a 100-point scale.; Sources: "Cincinnati 2023 Basketball Commitments". Rivals.; "2023 Cincinnati Basketball Commits". ESPN.; "2023 Team Ranking". Rivals.; "Cincinnati 2023 Basketball Commits". 247Sports.

== Roster ==
2023–24 Cincinnati Bearcats men's basketball team
Players
Coaches

Pos.	#	Name	Height	Weight	Year	Previous school	Hometown
G	0	Daniel Skillings	6 ft 6 in (1.98 m)	215 lb (98 kg)	So	Roman Catholic High School	Philadelphia, PA
G	1	Day Day Thomas	6 ft 0 in (1.83 m)	185 lb (84 kg)	Jr	Kilgore College	Columbia, SC
G	2	Jizzle James	6 ft 1 in (1.85 m)	195 lb (88 kg)	Fr	Olympia High School	Orlando, FL
G/F	3	Rayvon Griffith (redshirt)	6 ft 7 in (2.01 m)	205 lb (93 kg)	Fr	AZ Compass Prep	Cincinnati, OH
G	5	CJ Fredrick	6 ft 3 in (1.91 m)	190 lb (86 kg)	GS	Kentucky	Cincinnati, OH
G	10	Josh Reed	6 ft 7 in (2.01 m)	220 lb (100 kg)	So	Pace Academy	Atlanta, GA
G	11	CJ Anthony (W)	6 ft 0 in (1.83 m)	190 lb (86 kg)	Jr	Putnam Science Academy	Columbus, OH
F	13	Jamille Reynolds	6 ft 11 in (2.11 m)	275 lb (125 kg)	Sr	Temple	Saint Petersburg, FL
G	14	Landon Lang (W)	5 ft 11 in (1.8 m)	185 lb (84 kg)	GS	Ohio Northern	Mason, OH
G/F	15	John Newman III	6 ft 5 in (1.96 m)	215 lb (98 kg)	GS	Clemson	Greensboro, NC
G	21	Chase Kirkwood (W)	6 ft 1 in (1.85 m)	190 lb (86 kg)	Jr	Arkansas	Phoenix, MD
F	30	Viktor Lakhin	6 ft 11 in (2.11 m)	240 lb (109 kg)	RS Jr	CSKA–2	Anapa, Russia
F	33	Ody Oguama	6 ft 9 in (2.06 m)	230 lb (104 kg)	Sr	Wake Forest	Raleigh, NC
G/F	41	Simas Lukošius	6 ft 8 in (2.03 m)	225 lb (102 kg)	Jr	Butler	Kaunas, Lithuania
C	44	Sage Tolentino	7 ft 1 in (2.16 m)	240 lb (109 kg)	RS Fr	Hamilton High School	Kane'ohe, HI
C	55	Aziz Bandaogo	7 ft 0 in (2.13 m)	235 lb (107 kg)	Sr	Utah Valley	Dakar, Senegal

Head coach

- Wes Miller (North Carolina)

Assistant coach(es)

- Chad Dollar (South Florida)
- Andre Morgan (North Georgia)
- Drew Adams (Iowa)
- Josh Loeffler (Swarthmore)
- Jake Thelen (Bellarmine)

Legend

- (C) Team captain
- (S) Suspended
- (I) Ineligible
- (W) Walk-on
- Injured
- Current redshirt

Roster
Last update: November 1, 2023

== Schedule and results ==
Date time, TV	Rank^{#}	Opponent^{#}	Result	Record	High points	High rebounds	High assists	Site (attendance) city, state
Regular season
November 6, 2023*; 9:00 p.m., ESPN+		UIC	W 69–58	1–0	15 – Thomas	8 – Tied	3 – Thomas	Fifth Third Arena (9,936); Cincinnati, OH
November 10, 2023*; 7:00 p.m., ESPN+		Detroit Mercy	W 93–61	2–0	14 – Fredrick	12 – Reed	5 – Lukošius	Fifth Third Arena (4,267); Cincinnati, OH
November 12, 2023*; 12:00 p.m., ESPN+		Eastern Washington	W 85–73	3–0	26 – Lahkin	11 – Lahkin	5 – Thomas	Fifth Third Arena (3,063); Cincinnati, OH
November 19, 2023*; 2:00 p.m., ESPN+		Northern Kentucky	W 90–66	4–0	25 – Skillings	14 – Lahkin	7 – Lukošius	Fifth Third Arena (10,018); Cincinnati, OH
November 22, 2023*; 7:00 p.m., ESPN+		Georgia Tech	W 89–54	5–0	15 – Lahkin	9 – Bandaogo	4 – Tied	Fifth Third Arena (11,756); Cincinnati, OH
November 28, 2023*; 7:00 p.m., ESPN+		at Howard	W 86–81 ^{OT}	6–0	19 – Lahkin	6 – Tied	4 – Thomas	Burr Gymnasium (1,324); Washington, D.C.
December 3, 2023*; 1:00 p.m., ESPN+		Florida Gulf Coast	W 99–62	7–0	19 – Tied	12 – Skillings	6 – Lahkin	Fifth Third Arena (9,812); Cincinnati, OH
December 9, 2023*; 6:30 p.m., FS1		at Xavier; Crosstown Shootout	L 79–84	7–1	19 – James	10 – Bandaogo	3 – Tied	Cintas Center (10,724); Cincinnati, OH
December 12, 2023*; 7:00 p.m., ESPN+		Bryant	W 85–53	8–1	14 – Fredrick	17 – Bandaogo	3 – James	Fifth Third Arena (9,303); Cincinnati, OH
December 16, 2023*; 7:00 p.m., ESPN+		vs. Dayton; Hoops Classic	L 68–82	8–2	14 – Lukošius	14 – Bandaogo	2 – Tied	Heritage Bank Center (12,547); Cincinnati, OH
December 19, 2023*; 7:00 p.m., ESPN+		Merrimack	W 65–49	9–2	18 – Lahkin	11 – Reynolds	4 – Thomas	Fifth Third Arena (9,477); Cincinnati, OH
December 22, 2023*; 7:00 p.m., ESPN+		Stetson	W 83–75	10–2	29 – Skillings	10 – Skillings	7 – Fredrick	Fifth Third Arena (9,762); Cincinnati, OH
December 29, 2023*; 7:00 p.m., ESPN+		Evansville	W 76–58	11–2	16 – Newman III	9 – Lakhin	7 – Thomas	Fifth Third Arena (10,977); Cincinnati, OH
Big 12 regular season
January 6, 2024; 10:00 p.m., ESPN2		at No. 12 BYU	W 71–60	12–2 (1–0)	17 – Lakhin	10 – Bandaogo	3 – Lukošius	Marriott Center (16,879); Provo, UT
January 9, 2024; 7:00 p.m., ESPN+		No. 25 Texas	L 73–74	12–3 (1–1)	19 – Lukošius	6 – Newman III	4 – Lukošius	Fifth Third Arena (11,014); Cincinnati, OH
January 13, 2024; 8:00 p.m., ESPN2		at No. 14 Baylor	L 59–62	12–4 (1–2)	24 – Skillings	7 – Newman III	5 – Lukošius	Foster Pavilion (7,500); Waco, TX
January 16, 2024; 7:00 p.m., ESPN+		No. 19 TCU	W 81–77 ^{OT}	13–4 (2–2)	21 – Thomas	7 – Newman III	6 – Thomas	Fifth Third Arena (10,314); Cincinnati, OH
January 20, 2024; 1:00 p.m., ESPN+		No. 15 Oklahoma	L 65–69	13–5 (2–3)	17 – Lukošius	7 – Tied	6 – Thomas	Fifth Third Arena (12,406); Cincinnati, OH
January 22, 2024; 9:00 p.m., ESPN		at No. 7 Kansas	L 69–74	13–6 (2–4)	16 – Skillings	11 – Bandaogo	3 – Thomas	Allen Fieldhouse (16,300); Lawrence, KS
January 27, 2024; 7:00 p.m., ESPN+		UCF	W 68–57	14–6 (3–4)	21 – Skillings	7 – Tied	6 – Lukošius	Fifth Third Arena (12,112); Cincinnati, OH
January 31, 2024; 7:00 p.m., ESPN+		at West Virginia rivalry	L 65–69	14–7 (3–5)	15 – Skillings	9 – Bandaogo	4 – Thomas	WVU Coliseum (10,349); Morgantown, WV
February 3, 2024; 6:00 p.m., ESPN+		at No. 15 Texas Tech	W 75–72	15–7 (4–5)	16 – Lukošius	10 – Bandaogo	4 – Thomas	United Supermarkets Arena (15,098); Lubbock, TX
February 10, 2024; 4:00 p.m., ESPN2		No. 5 Houston	L 62–67	15–8 (4–6)	13 – Skillings	10 – Newman III	3 – Newman III	Fifth Third Arena (12,715); Cincinnati, OH
February 13, 2024; 7:00 p.m., ESPN2		No. 10 Iowa State	L 59–68	15–9 (4–7)	16 – James	11 – Skillings	3 – Tied	Fifth Third Arena (11,819); Cincinnati, OH
February 17, 2024; 4:00 p.m., ESPN+		at UCF	W 76–74	16–9 (5–7)	15 – Skillings Jr.	9 – Reynolds	3 – Thomas	Addition Financial Arena (8,624); Orlando, FL
February 21, 2024; 7:00 p.m., ESPN+		Oklahoma State	L 76–80	16–10 (5–8)	17 – Lukošius	10 – Skillings Jr.	4 – Lukošius	Fifth Third Arena (11,029); Cincinnati, OH
February 24, 2024; 3:00 p.m., ESPN+		at TCU	L 57–75	16–11 (5–9)	13 – Thomas	9 – Bandaogo	4 – Lukošius	Schollmaier Arena (6,090); Fort Worth, TX
February 27, 2024; 7:00 p.m., ESPN2		at No. 1 Houston	L 59–67	16–12 (5–10)	11 – Tied	9 – Lakhin	6 – Thomas	Fertitta Center (7,352); Houston, TX
March 2, 2024; 7:00 p.m., ESPN+		Kansas State	W 74–72	17–12 (6–10)	18 – Newman III	8 – Bandaogo	5 – Thomas	Fifth Third Arena (11,974); Cincinnati, OH
March 5, 2024; 8:00 p.m., ESPN+		at Oklahoma	L 71–74 ^{OT}	17–13 (6–11)	16 – James	9 – Skillings Jr.	3 – Thomas	Lloyd Noble Center (6,124); Norman, OK
March 9, 2024; 2:00 p.m., ESPN+		West Virginia rivalry	W 92–56	18–13 (7–11)	17 – Skillings Jr.	7 – Bandaogo	7 – Thomas	Fifth Third Arena (11,914); Cincinnati, OH
Big 12 Tournament
March 12, 2024; 3:00 p.m., ESPN+	(11)	vs. (14) West Virginia; First Round/rivalry	W 90–85	19–13	31 – Lukošius	13 – Bandaogo	4 – Tied	T-Mobile Center; Kansas City, MO
March 13, 2024; 9:30 p.m., ESPN2	(11)	vs. (6) No. 16 Kansas; Second Round	W 72–52	20–13	25 – Skillings Jr.	10 – Newman III	3 – Lukosius	T-Mobile Center (18,261); Kansas City, MO
March 14, 2024; 9:30 p.m., ESPN2	(11)	vs. (3) No. 14 Baylor; Quarterfinals	L 56–68	20–14	15 – Skillings Jr.	6 – Newman III	4 – Lukosius	T-Mobile Center (19,135); Kansas City, MO
NIT
March 20, 2024; 9:00 p.m., ESPN+	(2)	San Francisco; First Round - Indiana State Bracket	W 73–72 ^{OT}	21–14	28 – Lukosius	9 – Newman III	7 – Thomas	Fifth Third Arena (3,899); Cincinnati, OH
March 23, 2024; 2:00 p.m., ESPN+	(2)	(3) Bradley; Second Round - Indiana State Bracket	W 74–57	22–14	25 – James	9 – Newman III	4 – Newman III	Fifth Third Arena (4,732); Cincinnati, OH
March 26, 2024; 9:00 p.m., ESPN	(2)	at (1) Indiana State; Quarterfinals - Indiana State Bracket	L 81–85	22–15	26 – Lukosius	12 – Skillings Jr.	5 – James	Hulman Center (8,057); Terre Haute, IN
*Non-conference game. ^{#}Rankings from AP Poll. (#) Tournament seedings in parentheses. All times are in Eastern Time.
