= 2022–23 American Athletic Conference men's basketball season =

- League: NCAA Division I
- Sport: Basketball
- Duration: November 2022 through March 2023
- Teams: 11
- TV partner(s): CBS, ESPN, ESPN+

Regular season
- Season champions: Houston
- Season MVP: Marcus Sasser, Houston

Tournament
- Champions: Memphis
- Runners-up: Houston

American Athletic Conference men's basketball seasons
- ← 2021–22 2023–24 →

2022–23 American Athletic Conference men's basketball standings
	Conf.				Overall
Team	W		L	PCT	W		L	PCT
No. 2 Houston	17	–	1	.944	33	–	4	.892
No. 24 Memphis †	13	–	5	.722	26	–	9	.743
Tulane	12	–	6	.667	20	–	11	.645
Cincinnati	11	–	7	.611	23	–	13	.639
Temple	10	–	8	.556	16	–	16	.500
Wichita State	9	–	9	.500	17	–	15	.531
UCF	8	–	10	.444	19	–	15	.559
South Florida	7	–	11	.389	14	–	18	.438
East Carolina	6	–	12	.333	16	–	17	.485
SMU	5	–	13	.278	10	–	22	.313
Tulsa	1	–	17	.056	5	–	25	.167
† 2023 AAC tournament winner Rankings from AP poll

The 2022–23 American Athletic Conference men's basketball season began with practices in October 2022, followed by the start of the 2022–23 NCAA Division I men's basketball season on November 7, 2022. Conference play began December 27, 2022, and concluded with the 2023 American Athletic Conference men's basketball tournament, held March 9–12, 2023, at Dickies Arena in Fort Worth, Texas.

Scheduling stayed in the current format: an 18-game schedule in which every team in The American played eight of its 10 conference opponents twice and the other two opponents once—one at home and one on the road.

== Previous season ==
Houston won the regular season championship. The 2022 American Athletic Conference men's basketball tournament was held at Dickies Arena in Fort Worth, Texas, where it was also won by Houston. Houston and Memphis received bids to the NCAA tournament. Memphis lost in the second round to Gonzaga, while Houston advanced to the Elite Eight before losing to Villanova. The conference finished 4–2 overall. SMU received a bid to the 2022 National Invitation Tournament. SMU lost to Washington State in the second round. The conference went 1–1 overall in the NIT.

Kendric Davis from SMU was named the AAC Player of the Year. Houston's Kelvin Sampson was named Coach of the Year.

== Coaches ==
=== Coaching changes ===
Coach	School	Reason	Replacement
Joe Dooley	East Carolina	East Carolina fired Dooley after 4 seasons on March 11, 2022. It was his second stint with the program, having previously been the head coach from 1995–1999.	Michael Schwartz.
Frank Haith	Tulsa	On March 12, 2022, Haith announced that he was resigning after 8 seasons.	Eric Konkol.
Tim Jankovich	SMU	Jankovich announced his retirement after 6 seasons on March 22, 2022.	Rob Lanier.

=== Head coaches ===
Note: Stats are through the beginning of the season. All stats and records are from time at current school only.

Team	Head coach	Previous job	Years at school	Overall record	AAC record	AAC titles	NCAA tournaments*	NCAA Final Fours	NCAA Championships
Cincinnati	Wes Miller	UNC Greensboro	1	18–15	7–11	0	0	0	0
East Carolina	Michael Schwartz	Tennessee (asst.)	0	0–0	0–0	0	0	0	0
Houston	Kelvin Sampson	Houston Rockets (asst.)	8	199–70	100–43	3	4	1	0
Memphis	Penny Hardaway	East HS	4	85–43	45–24	0	1	0	0
SMU	Rob Lanier	Georgia State	0	0–0	0–0	0	0	0	0
South Florida	Brian Gregory	Michigan State (advisor)	5	65–89	26–61	0	0	0	0
Temple	Aaron McKie	Temple (asst.)	3	36–40	20–29	0	0	0	0
Tulane	Ron Hunter	Georgia State	3	36–46	18–34	0	0	0	0
Tulsa	Eric Konkol	Louisiana Tech	0	0–0	0–0	0	0	0	0
UCF	Johnny Dawkins	Stanford	6	112–72	57–51	0	1	0	0
Wichita State	Isaac Brown	Wichita State (asst.)	2	31–19	17–11	1	1	0	0

Notes:

- Overall and AAC records are from time at current school and are through the end of 2021–22 season. NCAA records include time at current school only.
- AAC records only, prior conference records not included.
- *In current job

== Preseason ==
=== Recruiting classes ===
2022 Recruiting classes rankings
Team	ESPN	Rivals	247 Sports	Signees
Cincinnati	-	No. 39	No. 35	3
East Carolina	-	-	No. 139	6
Houston	-	No. 16	No. 30	3
Memphis	-	-	-	-
SMU	-	-	-	-
South Florida	-	No. 73	No. 138	2
Temple	-	No. 97	No. 134	1
Tulane	-	-	No. 110	1
Tulsa	-	No. 58	No. 115	3
UCF	-	No. 52	No. 60	2
Wichita State	-	-	-	-

=== Preseason watchlists ===
Below is a table of notable preseason watch lists.

	Wooden	Naismith	Cousy	West	Erving	Malone	NABC	Abdul-Jabbar
Kendric Davis, Memphis	✓	✓	✓				✓	
Marcus Sasser, Houston	✓	✓		✓			✓	
Jarace Walker, Houston						✓		
DeAndre Williams, Memphis						✓		

=== Preseason media poll ===
On October 12, The American released the preseason Poll and other preseason awards.

Coaches Poll
Predicted finish	Team	Votes (1st place)
1	Houston	100 (10)
2	Memphis	87 (1)
3	Cincinnati	82
4	Tulane	74
5	Temple	66
6	UCF	51
7	SMU	43
8	Wichita State	35
9	South Florida	33
10	Tulsa	21
11	East Carolina	13

=== Preseason All-AAC ===
Honor	Recipient
Preseason Player of the Year	Marcus Sasser, Houston
Preseason Rookie of the Year	Jarace Walker, Houston*
Preseason All-AAC First Team
Preseason All-AAC First Team	Marcus Sasser, Houston*
Preseason All-AAC First Team	Kendric Davis, Memphis*
Preseason All-AAC First Team	DeAndre Williams, Memphis
Preseason All-AAC First Team	Damian Dunn, Temple
Preseason All-AAC First Team	Jalen Cook, Tulane*
Preseason All-AAC Second Team
Preseason All-AAC Second Team	David DeJulius, Cincinnati
Preseason All-AAC Second Team	Jamal Shead, Houston
Preseason All-AAC Second Team	Khalif Battle, Temple
Preseason All-AAC Second Team	Kevin Cross, Tulane
Preseason All-AAC Second Team	Jaylen Forbes, Tulane
*Unanimous selections

== Regular season ==
=== Conference matrix ===
This table summarizes the head-to-head results between teams in conference play.

	Cincinnati	East Carolina	Houston	Memphis	SMU	South Florida	Temple	Tulane	Tulsa	UCF	Wichita State
vs. Cincinnati	–	1–1	2–0	2–0	0–2	0–2	1–1	1–1	0–1	0–2	0–1
vs. East Carolina	1–1	–	1–0	1–0	1–1	2–0	2–0	1–1	0–2	2–0	1–1
vs. Houston	0–2	0–1	–	0–2	0–2	0–1	1–1	0–2	0–2	0–2	0–2
vs. Memphis	0–2	0–1	2–0	–	0–2	0–2	0–2	2–0	0–1	1–1	0–2
vs. SMU	2–0	1–1	2–0	2–0	–	1–1	0–1	2–0	0–2	1–0	2–0
vs. South Florida	2–0	0–2	1–0	2–0	1–1	–	2–0	1–0	0–2	0–2	2–0
vs. Temple	1–1	0–2	1–1	2–0	1–0	0–2	–	2–0	0–2	0–2	1–0
vs. Tulane	1–1	1–1	2–0	0–2	0–2	0–1	0–2	–	1–1	0–1	1–1
vs. Tulsa	1–0	2–0	2–0	1–0	2–0	2–0	2–0	1–1	–	2–0	2–0
vs. UCF	2–0	0–2	2–0	1–1	0–1	2–0	2–0	1–0	0–2	–	0–2
vs. Wichita State	1–0	1–1	2–0	2–0	0–2	0–2	0–1	1–1	0–2	2–0	–
Total	11–7	6–12	17–1	13–5	5–13	7–11	10–8	12–6	1–17	8–10	9–9

=== Player of the week ===
Throughout the regular season, the American Athletic Conference named a player and rookie of the week.

Week	Player of the week	Freshman of the week	Ref.
Week 1 – Nov 14	David DeJulius, Cincinnati	Jarace Walker, Houston	
Week 2 – Nov 21	Marcus Sasser, Houston	Taylor Hendricks, UCF	
Week 3 – Nov 28	Kendric Davis, Memphis	Taylor Hendricks (2), UCF	
Week 4 – Dec 5	Khalif Battle, Temple	Taylor Hendricks (3), UCF	
Week 5 – Dec 12	Kendric Davis (2), Memphis	Taylor Hendricks (4), UCF	
Week 6 – Dec 19	Kendric Davis (3), Memphis	Jarace Walker (2), Houston	
Week 7 – Dec 26	Zhuric Phelps, SMU	Emanuel Sharp, Houston	
Week 8 – Jan 2	Kendric Davis (4), Memphis	Taylor Hendricks (5), UCF	
Week 9 – Jan 9	Jaylen Forbes, Tulane	Jarace Walker (3), Houston	
Week 10 – Jan 16	Kendric Davis (5), Memphis; Jaylen Forbes (2), Tulane	Taylor Hendricks (6), UCF	
Week 11 – Jan 23	DeAndre Williams, Memphis	Jarace Walker (4), Houston	
Week 12 – Jan 30	Kendric Davis (6), Memphis; Khalif Battle (2), Temple	Jarace Walker (5), Houston	
Week 13 – Feb 6	Jalen Cook, Tulane	Jarace Walker (6), Houston	
Week 14 – Feb 13	DeAndre Williams (2), Memphis	Taylor Hendricks (7), UCF	
Week 15 – Feb 20	Jalen Cook (2), Tulane	Ezra Ausar, East Carolina	
Week 16 – Feb 27	DeAndre Williams (3), Memphis	Taylor Hendricks (8), UCF	
Week 17 – Mar 6	Jamal Shead, Houston	Taylor Hendricks (9), UCF	

=== All-AAC Awards and teams ===
Honor	Recipient
Player of the Year	Marcus Sasser, Houston
Coach of the Year	Kelvin Sampson, Houston
Freshman of the Year	Jarace Walker, Houston
Defensive Player of the Year	Jamal Shead, Houston
Most Improved Player	J'Wan Roberts, Houston
Sixth Man of the Year	Reggie Chaney, Houston
Sportsmanship Award	Ludgy Debaut, East Carolina; Sion James, Tulane
All-AAC First Team
All-AAC First Team	Landers Nolley II, Cincinnati
All-AAC First Team	Marcus Sasser, Houston*
All-AAC First Team	Kendric Davis, Memphis*
All-AAC First Team	DeAndre Williams, Memphis
All-AAC First Team	Jalen Cook, Tulane
All-AAC Second Team
All-AAC Second Team	Taylor Hendricks, UCF
All-AAC Second Team	Jamal Shead, Houston
All-AAC Second Team	J'Wan Roberts, Houston
All-AAC Second Team	Jarace Walker, Houston
All-AAC Second Team	Jaylen Forbes, Tulane
All-AAC Third Team
All-AAC Third Team	David DeJulius, Cincinnati
All-AAC Third Team	Tyler Harris, South Florida
All-AAC Third Team	Damian Dunn, Temple
All-AAC Third Team	Kevin Cross, Tulane
All-AAC Third Team	Craig Porter Jr., Wichita State
All-Freshman Team
All-Freshman Team	Taylor Hendricks, UCF*
All-Freshman Team	Ezra Ausar, East Carolina*
All-Freshman Team	Jarace Walker, Houston*
All-Freshman Team	Terrance Arceneaux, Houston
All-Freshman Team	Emanuel Sharp, Houston
*Unanimous selections

== Postseason ==
=== American Athletic Conference tournament ===
* – Denotes overtime period

First round Thursday, March 9
8	South Florida	58
9	East Carolina	73
7	UCF	76
10	SMU	70
6	Wichita State	81
11	Tulsa	63

Quarterfinals; Friday, March 10
1	Houston	60
9	East Carolina	46
4	Cincinnati	84
5	Temple	54
2	Memphis	81
7	UCF	76
3	Tulane	82
6	Wichita State	76

Semifinals; Saturday, March 11
1	Houston	69
4	Cincinnati	48
2	Memphis	94
3	Tulane	54

Championship; Sunday, March 12
1	Houston	65
2	Memphis	75

=== NCAA tournament ===
Seed	Region	School	First Four	First Round	Second Round	Sweet Sixteen	Elite Eight	Final Four	Championship
1	Midwest	Houston	N/A	defeated (16) Northern Kentucky, 63–52	defeated (9) Auburn, 81–64	eliminated by (5) Miami (FL), 75–89	–	–	–
8	East	Memphis	N/A	eliminated by (9) Florida Atlantic, 65–66	–	–	–	–	–
		W–L (%):	0–0 (–)	1–1 (.500)	1–0 (1.000)	0–1 (.000)	0–0 (–)	0–0 (–)	0–0 (–) Total: 2–2 (.500)

=== National Invitation tournament ===
Seed	Bracket	School	First Round	Second Round	Quarterfinals	Semifinals	Finals
4	Rutgers	Cincinnati	defeated Virginia Tech, 81–72	defeated Hofstra, 79–65	eliminated by Utah Valley, 68–74	–	–
–	Oregon	UCF	defeated (4) Florida, 67–49	eliminated by (1) Oregon, 54–68	–	–	–
		W–L (%):	2–0 (1.000)	1–1 (.500)	0–1 (.000)	0–0 (–)	0–0 (–) Total: 3–2 (.600)

== NBA draft ==
The following list includes all AAC players who were drafted in the 2023 NBA draft.

Player	Position	School	Round	Pick	Team
Jarace Walker	PF	Houston	1	8	Washington Wizards
Taylor Hendricks	PF	UCF	1	9	Utah Jazz
Marcus Sasser	SG/PG	Houston	1	25	Memphis Grizzlies
