= David DeJulius =

American basketball player (born 1999)

- DeJulius with Beşiktaş in 2026

No. 5 – Beşiktaş Fuzul
- Position: Point guard
- League: BSL; EuroLeague

Personal information
- Born: August 9, 1999 (age 27) Detroit, Michigan, U.S.
- Listed height: 6 ft 0 in (1.83 m)
- Listed weight: 200 lb (91 kg)

Career information
- High school: Edison Public School Academy (Detroit, Michigan); East English Village Preparatory Academy (Detroit, Michigan)
- College: Michigan (2018–2020); Cincinnati (2020–2023)
- NBA draft: 2023: undrafted
- Playing career: 2023–present

Career history
- 2023–2024: Lavrio
- 2024: Göttingen
- 2024: Aris Thessaloniki
- 2024–2025: Maccabi Tel Aviv
- 2025: →Bursaspor
- 2025–present: UCAM Murcia
- 2026–present: →Beşiktaş

Career highlights
- All-Liga ACB First Team (2026); 2× Third-team All-AAC (2022, 2023)

David Michael DeJulius (born August 9, 1999) is an American-born naturalized Slovak professional basketball player for Beşiktaş of the Basketbol Süper Ligi (BSL) and the EuroLeague, on loan from UCAM Murcia. He previously played college basketball for the Cincinnati Bearcats, where he was a two-time Third-team All-AAC performer, as well as for the Michigan Wolverines. He attended Edison Public School Academy for two years before transferring to East English Village Preparatory Academy, where he finished 3rd in the 2018 Mr. Basketball of Michigan and was 2018 Mr. PSL for his play in the Detroit Public School League.

== Early life ==
DeJulius was born August 9, 1999, in Detroit, Michigan to Latrice Halthon and Ladell DeJulius. He has a brother, Terrell Thornton, and three sisters, Aaliyah DeJulius, Cerisse DeJulius and Latriece DeJulius.

== High school ==
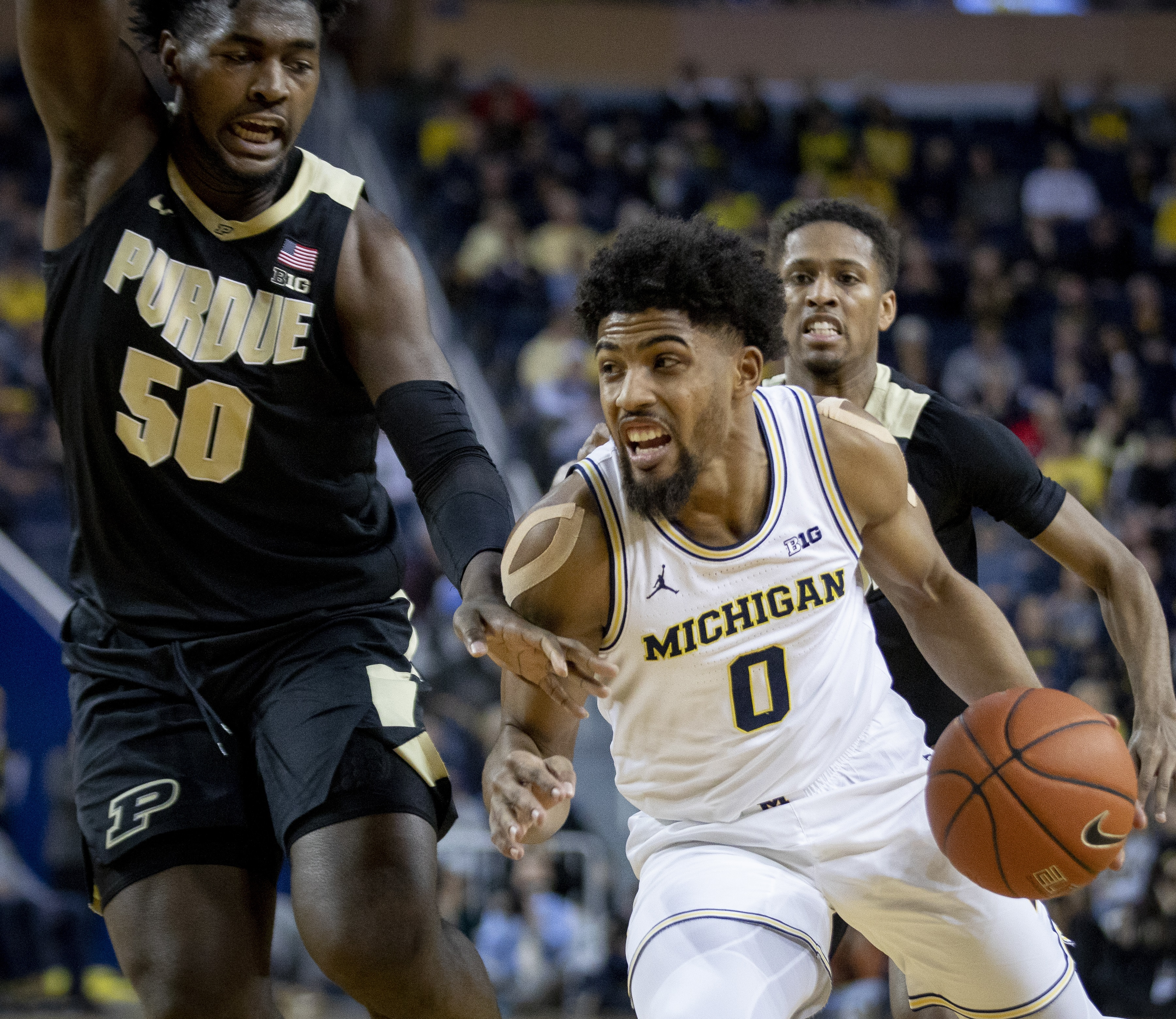
DeJulius driving against Trevion Williams in January 2020

DeJulius attended Edison Public School Academy for his freshman and sophomore seasons. As a freshman, he was selected to the 2015 Class C All-State team (2nd team, The Detroit News; 4th team Detroit Free Press). As a sophomore, he was again selected to the 2016 Class C All-State team (2nd team, The Detroit News; 3rd team Detroit Free Press; honorable mention Associated Press).

DeJulius transferred to East English Village Preparatory Academy for his junior and senior seasons. As a junior, he visited the University of Michigan a few times (including September 17, 2016, and October 25, 2016). He scored 46 points with 7 rebounds and 5 assists against Dakota High School and Michigan State Spartans men's basketball signee Thomas Kithier in front of head coach John Beilein and the entire coaching staff on December 17, 2016. DeJulius got an offer and gave a verbal commitment on December 22. At the time, he was the 172nd ranked player in the national class of 2018 and the 32nd ranked point guard. DeJulius was a 2017 Class A All-state honoree (1st team Associated Press).

On November 10, 2017, DeJulius tendered his National Letter of Intent as part of a five-man recruiting class that included Ignas Brazdeikis, Colin Castleton, Brandon Johns, and Adrien Nunez. DeJulius also had offers from Michigan State and DePaul. DeJulius earned 2018 Mr. PSL for his play in the Detroit Public School League. In January 2018, DeJulius scored 49 points in a 92–82 victory against Chicago's Orr Academy High School with 13-of-19 shooting from the field, including 9-of-11 3-point shooting. Orr was the defending 2017 Illinois High School Association Class 2A state champion and would repeat in 2018.

With 2,542 points, DeJulius finished 3rd behind Michigan State signee Foster Loyer (3,691) and Michigan signee Brandon Johns (2,792) in the 2018 Mr. Basketball of Michigan voting. In his only head-to-head meeting with Loyer, DeJulius scored 42 points in an 80–71 comeback to give Clarkston High School its only regular season loss against 21 points, 12 assists, and eight rebounds from Loyer. East English had trailed in the battle of the state's two best point guards 49–31 at halftime and 63–53 after three quarters. Then, DeJulius had 25 points in the second half, including 17 in the fourth quarter, against the defending 2017 Michigan High School Athletic Association Class A state champions, who would repeat in 2018. DeJulius was a 2018 All-class first team All-state selection by The Detroit News.

College recruiting
Name	Hometown	School	Height	Weight	Commit date
David DeJulius; PG	Detroit, MI	East English Village Preparatory Academy (MI)	6 ft 0.5 in (1.84 m)	190 lb (86 kg)	Dec 22, 2016
David DeJulius; PG	Recruit ratings: Rivals: 247Sports: ESPN:				
Overall recruit ranking: Scout: 107, 19 (PG), 5 (MI) Rivals: 97, 19 (PG) ESPN: 94, 21 (PG), 5 (MI)
Note: In many cases, Scout, Rivals, 247Sports, On3, and ESPN may conflict in their listings of height and weight.; In these cases, the average was taken. ESPN grades are on a 100-point scale.; Sources: "Michigan 2018 Basketball Commitments". Rivals.; "2018 Michigan Basketball Commits". Scout.; "ESPN Recruiting Nation Basketball". ESPN.; "Scout.com Team Recruiting Rankings". Scout.; "2018 Team Ranking". Rivals.

== College ==
=== Michigan ===
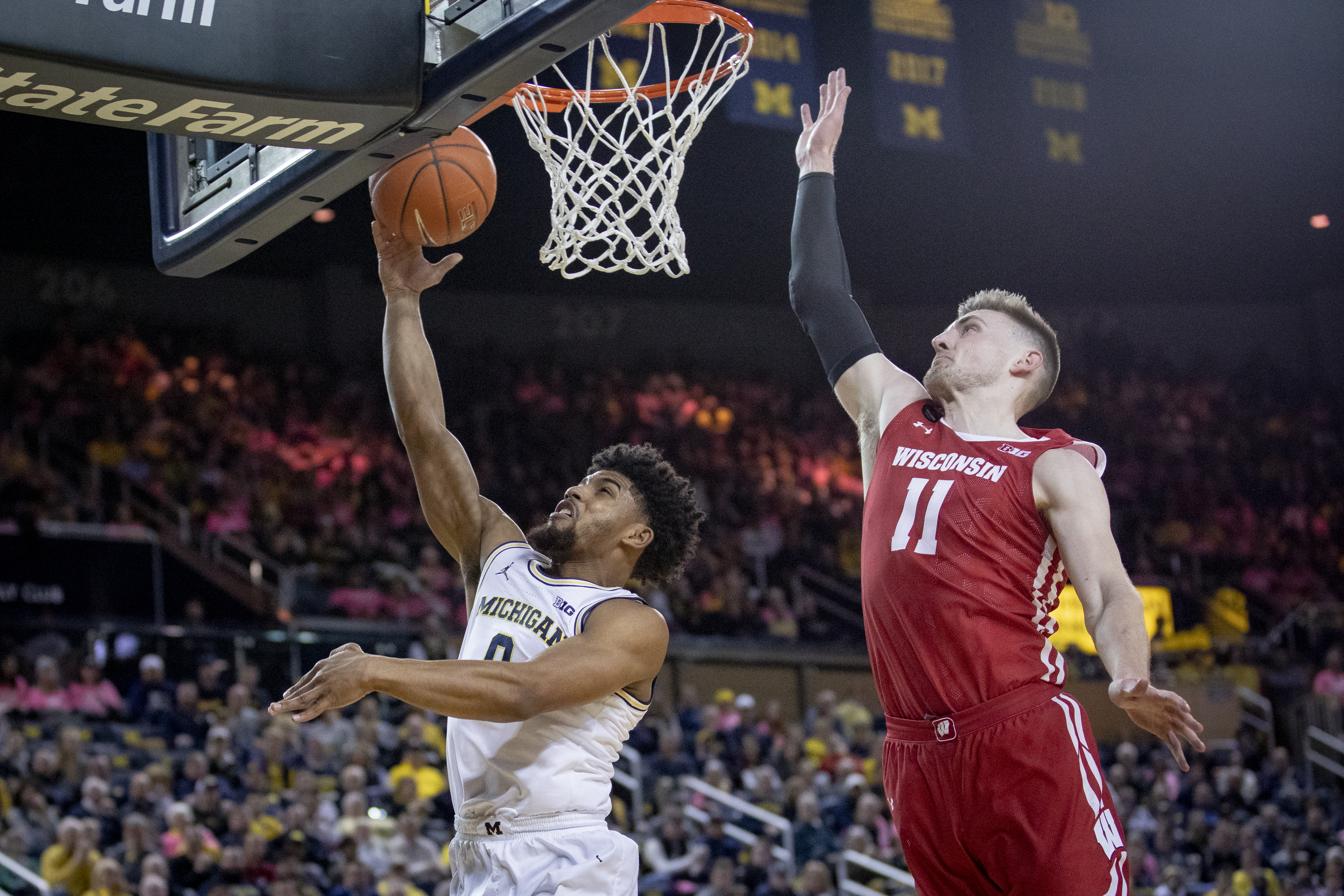
DeJulius gets past Micah Potter in February 2020

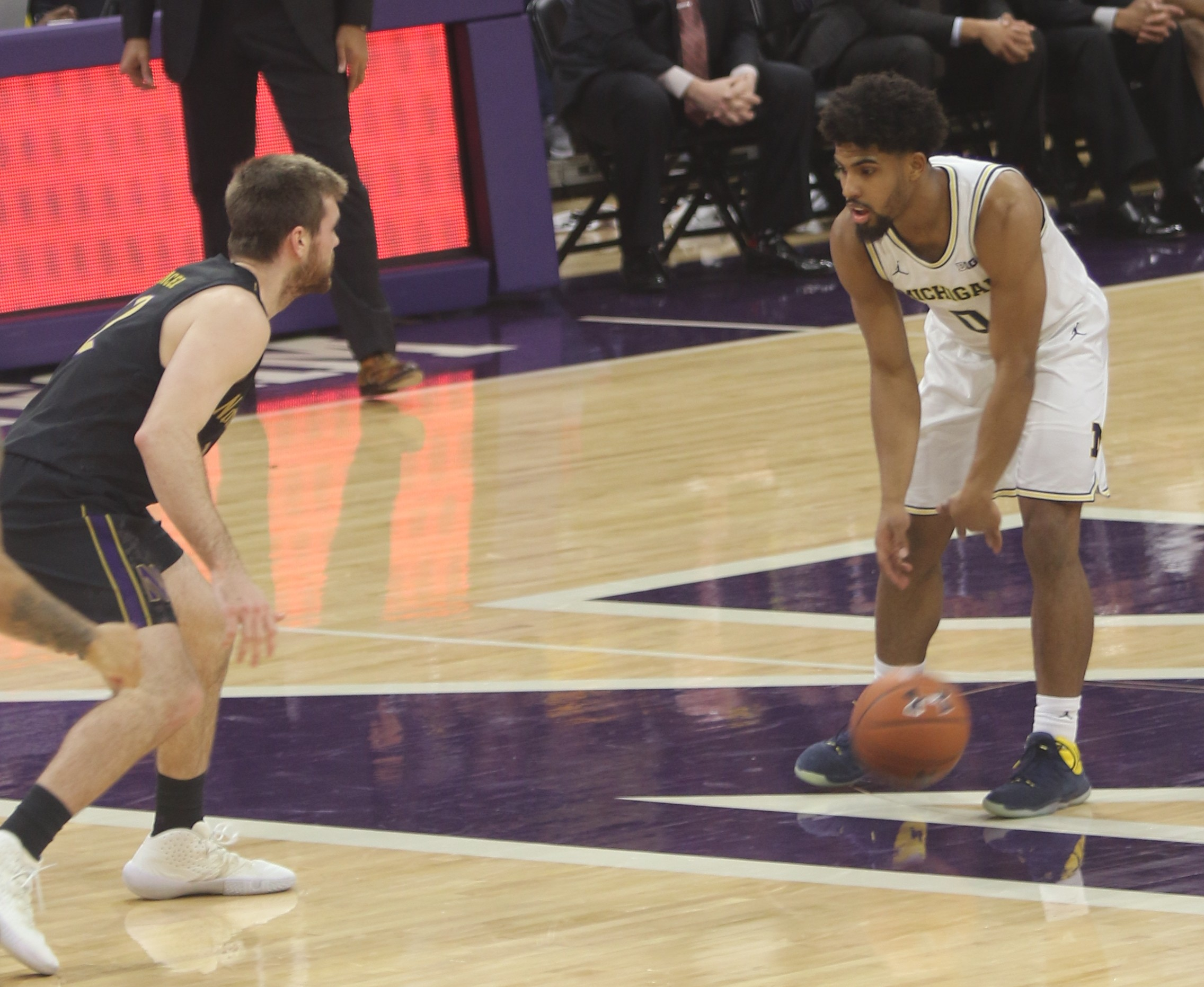
DeJulius against Pat Spencer in February 2020

==== Freshman season ====
The 2017–18 Michigan team was the national runner-up in the 2018 NCAA Division I men's basketball tournament. The 2018–19 team was expected to be ranked by ESPN (17) and CBS Sports (21). Of the incoming class, Brazdeikis had the highest expectations from Yahoo! Sports and ESPN. USA Today expected Johns to be the brightest newcomer. DeJulius played 25 games as a freshman for the 2018–19 Wolverines. By the end of the season, DeJulius was behind Zavier Simpson and his backup Eli Brooks on the depth chart for head coach John Beilein. The team lost the last game of the regular season to Loyer's Michigan State Spartans, finishing one game behind the Spartans and Purdue for the Big Ten regular season championship. The team was unable to defend its Big Ten Tournament championship in the championship game of the 2019 Big Ten men's basketball tournament against Michigan State, who swept three rivalry games from Michigan that season. The Wolverines finished the season with a 30–7 record, for its second consecutive 30-win season, losing in the Sweet Sixteen round of the 2019 NCAA tournament to (#9/#10) Texas Tech.

==== Sophomore season ====
On May 22, 2019, Juwan Howard signed a five-year contract as the head coach of the Michigan Wolverines men's basketball team. Brazdeikis, Charles Matthews and Jordan Poole declared for the 2019 NBA draft. During the Michigan Wolverines' 2019–20 season, DeJulius played as a sophomore alongside starting guards Simpson and Brooks as well as Franz Wagner. Serving in a sixth man role, he averaged 7.0 points, 2.4 rebounds, and 1.5 assists in 20.9 minutes per game coming off the bench.

On November 15, Michigan defeated Elon 70–50 DeJulius added 10 points and eight assists, which were both career highs at the time. On November 27, Michigan defeated Iowa State 83–76 in the quarterfinals of the Battle 4 Atlantis tournament. DeJulius added a career-high 14 points. On January 28, with Simpson suspended and Isaiah Livers sidelined, DeJulius started against Nebraska and played 34 minutes. On March 8, Michigan lost to (#9/#9) Maryland 70–83 in their final game of the regular season. Michigan was led by DeJulius with a career-high 20 points. Michigan was scheduled to play Rutgers in the Big Ten tournament on March 12. However, the tournament and the remainder of the college basketball season was cancelled due to the coronavirus pandemic.

DeJulius entered the NCAA transfer portal in April 2020 even though Simpson had completed his eligibility and Brooks would be a senior. In the portal, he received interest from Maryland, Missouri, Marquette, Cincinnati, Iowa State, DePaul, Rhode Island, Creighton and Arizona State. With over 20 schools expressing interest, DeJulius announced four finalists by April 10: Iowa State, Cincinnati, Marquette and Missouri. During his sophomore year with the Wolverines, DeJulius scored 10 or more points in eleven games. There was speculation that he might secure the starting point guard position if he continued with the team. However, Michigan had been pursuing point guards Bryce Aiken and Mike Smith in the transfer portal and recruiting Josh Christopher prior to DeJulius's announcement that he would transfer.

=== Cincinnati ===
==== Junior season ====
In August 2020, he was granted a waiver to play immediately as a transfer. On February 25, 2021, he became the fifth member of the 2020–21 Cincinnati Bearcats to opt out of the rest of the 2020–21 NCAA Division I men's basketball season due to the mental impact of COVID-19. Within two days after the March 14, 2021 American Athletic Conference men's basketball tournament championship game loss to Houston, the Bearcats saw six players enter the transfer portal. On March 26, the Athletic Director John Cunningham announced an investigation against the basketball program. On April 3, Cincinnati head coach John Brannen was placed on indefinite leave. On April 9, Cincinnati fired Brannen. On April 14, 2021, Cincinnati hired Wes Miller to become their next head coach, replacing Brannen.

==== Senior season ====
On January 30, 2022, he scored the go-ahead basket with 3.7 seconds left against East Carolina. DeJulius posted 3 consecutive 20-point games on February 6 (25, #6 Houston), February 9 (24, South Florida), and February 12 (23, Tulsa), marking the first such streak by a Bearcat since Jarron Cumberland did so for the 2018–19 Bearcats over 3 years before. On February 24, 2022, he announced that he would not partake in Senior Night fanfare, in part because he was eligible to return with another year due to special COVID-19 waiver. DeJulius earned third-team All-American Athletic Conference as a true senior for the 2021–22 Cincinnati Bearcats men's basketball team. He averaged a team-leading 14.5 points per game, was the team's only All-AAC performer and decided to exercise his option to return.

==== COVID Redshirt 5th year season ====
DeJulius earned 2022–23 Preseason All-Conference Second Team recognition for his redshirt senior season. Before the season, he announced that he would donate his student athlete compensation proceeds from his team-licensed jersey sales to provide books to inner city youth in Detroit and Cincinnati. He began the season by leading the 2022–23 Cincinnati Bearcats to three victories, averaging 21.3 points and 3.7 assists while shooting 56.1% from the field, including 7-of-9 on three-point shots, and earning American Athletic Conference player of the week honors. When DeJulius was honored on March 5, 2023 Senior Night, along with Kalu Ezikpe and Rob Phinisee prior to the game against SMU, he posted a career-high 30 points with 6 assists. He repeated as an All-American Athletic Conference third-team honoree. DeJulius entered the 2023 American Athletic Conference men's basketball tournament with the nation's longest streak of five or more assists (16 games). In the 2023 National Invitation Tournament first round victory over Virginia Tech, DeJulius had 21 points, 6 rebounds and 7 assists. After three years at Cincinnati, DeJulius posted 1187 points and ended his final season with 192 assists, which is third in school history behind two Oscar Robertson totals on the school list for single-season assists.

== Professional career ==
On August 3, 2023, DeJulius signed his first professional contract overseas with Greek club Lavrio. He averaged 14.4 points, 2.9 rebounds and 2.2 assists per game in the Greek Basket League.

On January 13, 2024, his contract was bought out by German club BG Göttingen, where he averaged 13.6 points and 5.1 assists per game.

On June 22, 2024, DeJulius returned to Greece, signing with Aris Thessaloniki.

On November 4, 2024, DeJulius moved to EuroLeague mainstays Maccabi Tel Aviv, signing a two-year contract. Aris received a 200.000€ buyout for the completion of the transfer.

On February 21, 2025, DeJulius was loaned to Bursaspor of the Turkish Basketbol Süper Ligi (BSL) for the rest of the season.

On June 30, 2025, he signed with UCAM Murcia in the Spanish Liga ACB.

== Career statistics ==
Legend
GP	Games played	GS	Games started	MPG	Minutes per game
FG%	Field goal percentage	3P%	3-point field goal percentage	FT%	Free throw percentage
RPG	Rebounds per game	APG	Assists per game	SPG	Steals per game
BPG	Blocks per game	PPG	Points per game	**Bold**	Career high

=== College ===
Year	Team	GP	GS	MPG	FG%	3P%	FT%	RPG	APG	SPG	BPG	PPG
2018–19	Michigan	25	0	3.8	.200	.067	.167	0.5	0.2	0.2	0.0	0.6
2019–20	Michigan	31	1	20.9	.417	**.361**	.725	2.4	1.5	0.4	0.0	7.0
2020–21	Cincinnati	19	16	29.5	.360	.203	.775	**4.5**	4.2	0.8	**0.1**	9.1
2021–22	Cincinnati	33	33	28.6	.409	.297	.824	2.8	2.6	0.7	0.0	14.5
2022–23	Cincinnati	**36**	**36**	**32.5**	**.419**	.335	**.856**	2.3	**5.3**	**1.1**	0.0	**14.8**
**Career**		144	86	23.8	.402	.299	.801	2.4	2.8	0.7	0.0	9.8

== Personal life ==
In February 2026, DeJulius obtained a Slovak citizenship to be able to play for the national team.

== See also ==
- Cincinnati Bearcats men's basketball statistical leaders
