= Cincinnati Bearcats men's basketball statistical leaders =

The Cincinnati Bearcats men's basketball statistical leaders are individual statistical leaders of the Cincinnati Bearcats men's basketball program in various categories, including points, rebounds, assists, steals, and blocks. Within those areas, the lists identify single-game, single-season, and career leaders. The Bearcats represent the University of Cincinnati in the NCAA Division I Big 12 Conference.

Cincinnati began competing in intercollegiate basketball in 1901. However, the school's record book does not generally list records from before the 1950s, as records from before this period are often incomplete and inconsistent. Since scoring was much lower in this era, and teams played much fewer games during a typical season, it is likely that few or no players from this era would appear on these lists anyway.

The NCAA did not officially record assists as a stat until the 1983–84 season, and blocks and steals until the 1985–86 season, but Cincinnati's record books includes players in these stats before these seasons. These lists are updated through the end of the 2020–21 season.

== Scoring ==
Career
| Rk | Player | Points | Seasons |
|---|---|---|---|
| 1 | Oscar Robertson | 2973 | 1957–58 1958–59 1959–60 |
| 2 | Sean Kilpatrick | 2145 | 2010–11 2011–12 2012–13 2013–14 |
| 3 | Steve Logan | 1985 | 1998–99 1999–2000 2000–01 2001–02 |
| 4 | Deonta Vaughn | 1885 | 2006–07 2007–08 2008–09 2009–10 |
| 5 | Danny Fortson | 1881 | 1994–95 1995–96 1996–97 |
| 6 | Roger McClendon | 1789 | 1984–85 1985–86 1986–87 1987–88 |
| 7 | Jarron Cumberland | 1782 | 2016–17 2017–18 2018–19 2019–20 |
| 8 | Pat Cummings | 1762 | 1974–75 1975–76 1977–78 1978–79 |
| 9 | Ron Bonham | 1666 | 1961–62 1962–63 1963–64 |
| 10 | Louis Banks | 1644 | 1987–88 1988–89 1989–90 1990–91 |

Season
| Rk | Player | Points | Season |
|---|---|---|---|
| 1 | Oscar Robertson | 1011 | 1959–60 |
| 2 | Oscar Robertson | 984 | 1957–58 |
| 3 | Oscar Robertson | 978 | 1958–59 |
| 4 | Steve Logan | 770 | 2001–02 |
| 5 | Jack Twyman | 712 | 1954–55 |
| 6 | Danny Fortson | 703 | 1996–97 |
| 7 | Sean Kilpatrick | 701 | 2013–14 |
| 8 | Danny Fortson | 664 | 1995–96 |
| 9 | Pat Cummings | 661 | 1978–79 |
| 10 | Jarron Cumberland | 657 | 2018–19 |

Single game
| Rk | Player | Points | Season | Opponent |
|---|---|---|---|---|
| 1 | Oscar Robertson | 62 | 1959–60 | North Texas State |
| 2 | Oscar Robertson | 56 | 1957–58 | Seton Hall |
| | Oscar Robertson | 56 | 1957–58 | Arkansas |
| 4 | Oscar Robertson | 50 | 1957–58 | St. Louis |
| | Oscar Robertson | 50 | 1957–58 | Wichita State |
| | Oscar Robertson | 50 | 1959–60 | Iowa |

== Rebounds ==
Career
| Rk | Player | Rebounds | Seasons |
|---|---|---|---|
| 1 | Oscar Robertson | 1338 | 1957–58 1958–59 1959–60 |
| 2 | Jack Twyman | 1242 | 1951–52 1952–53 1953–54 1954–55 |
| 3 | Gary Clark | 1132 | 2014–15 2015–16 2016–17 2017–18 |
| 4 | Paul Hogue | 1088 | 1959–60 1960–61 1961–62 |
| 5 | Robert Miller | 1060 | 1974–75 1975–76 1976–77 1977–78 |
| 6 | Dwight Jones | 983 | 1979–80 1980–81 1981–82 1982–83 |

Season
| Rk | Player | Rebounds | Season |
|---|---|---|---|
| 1 | Oscar Robertson | 489 | 1958–59 |
| 2 | Jack Twyman | 478 | 1954–55 |
| 3 | Connie Dierking | 433 | 1956–57 |
| 4 | Oscar Robertson | 425 | 1957–58 |
| 5 | Oscar Robertson | 424 | 1959–60 |

Single game
| Rk | Player | Rebounds | Season | Opponent |
|---|---|---|---|---|
| 1 | Connie Dierking | 33 | 1956–57 | Loyola (La.) |
| 2 | Connie Dierking | 31 | 1957–58 | North Texas State |
| 3 | Jack Twyman | 30 | 1954–55 | Miami (Ohio) |
| | Connie Dierking | 30 | 1955–56 | Geo. Washington |

== Assists ==
Career
| Rk | Player | Assists | Seasons |
|---|---|---|---|
| 1 | Troy Caupain | 515 | 2013–14 2014–15 2015–16 2016–17 |
| 2 | Deonta Vaughn | 511 | 2006–07 2007–08 2008–09 2009–10 |
| 3 | Eddie Lee | 500 | 1976–77 1977–78 1978–79 1979–80 |
| 4 | Cashmere Wright | 482 | 2009–10 2010–11 2011–12 2012–13 |
| 5 | Steve Logan | 456 | 1998–99 1999–2000 2000–01 2001–02 |
| 6 | Oscar Robertson | 425 | 1957–58 1958–59 1959–60 |
| 7 | Jarron Cumberland | 415 | 2016–17 2017–18 2018–19 2019–20 |
| 8 | Damon Flint | 407 | 1993–94 1994–95 1995–96 1996–97 |

Season
| Rk | Player | Assists | Season |
|---|---|---|---|
| 1 | Oscar Robertson | 219 | 1959–60 |
| 2 | Oscar Robertson | 206 | 1958–59 |
| 3 | David DeJulius | 192 | 2022–23 |
| 4 | Keith LeGree | 189 | 1995–96 |
| 5 | Steve Logan | 187 | 2001–02 |
| 6 | Eddie Lee | 180 | 1978–79 |

Single game
| Rk | Player | Assists | Season | Opponent |
|---|---|---|---|---|
| 1 | Steve Logan | 16 | 2001–02 | Coppin State |
| 2 | Eddie Lee | 15 | 1978–79 | Seton Hall |
| 3 | Oscar Robertson | 13 | 1958–59 | Kansas State |
| 4 | Oscar Robertson | 12 | 1958–59 | Pacific |
| | Oscar Robertson | 12 | 1959–60 | DePaul |
| | Dean Foster | 12 | 1965–66 | Wichita State |
| | Eddie Lee | 12 | 1978–79 | West Virginia |
| | Eddie Lee | 12 | 1978–79 | Florida State |
| | Eddie Lee | 12 | 1979–80 | North Carolina |
| | Elnardo Givens | 12 | 1987–88 | South Florida |
| | David DeJulius | 12 | 2020–21 | SMU |
| | David DeJulius | 12 | 2022–23 | ECU |

== Steals ==
Career
| Rk | Player | Steals | Seasons |
|---|---|---|---|
| 1 | Cashmere Wright | 198 | 2009–10 2010–11 2011–12 2012–13 |
| 2 | David Kennedy | 189 | 1977–78 1978–79 1979–80 1980–81 |
| 3 | Darnell Burton | 184 | 1993–94 1994–95 1995–96 1996–97 |
| 4 | Deonta Vaughn | 172 | 2006–07 2007–08 2008–09 2009–10 |
| 5 | Sean Kilpatrick | 166 | 2010–11 2011–12 2012–13 2013–14 |
| 6 | Eddie Lee | 163 | 1976–77 1977–78 1978–79 1979–80 |
| | Gary Clark | 163 | 2014–15 2015–16 2016–17 2017–18 |
| 8 | Louis Banks | 153 | 1987–88 1988–89 1989–90 1990–91 |

Season
| Rk | Player | Steals | Season |
|---|---|---|---|
| 1 | Cashmere Wright | 74 | 2011–12 |
| 2 | Brian Williams | 66 | 1976–77 |
| | David Kennedy | 66 | 1978–79 |
| 4 | Devan Downey | 65 | 2005–06 |

Single game
| Rk | Player | Steals | Season | Opponent |
|---|---|---|---|---|
| 1 | Dick Dallmer | 8 | 1948–49 | Xavier |
| | Tony Bobbitt | 8 | 2003–04 | Coppin State |
| 3 | Michael Horton | 7 | 1997–98 | Louisville |
| | Cashmere Wright | 7 | 2011–12 | Villanova |
| | Day Day Thomas | 7 | 2024–25 | DePaul |
| 6 | Brian Williams | 6 | 1976–77 | Kent State |
| | Brian Williams | 6 | 1976–77 | St. Joseph's (Ind.) |
| | Eddie Lee | 6 | 1976–77 | Rutgers |
| | Bobby Austin | 6 | 1978–79 | Tulane |
| | Kenneth Henry | 6 | 1985–86 | East. Kentucky |
| | Ronnie Ellison | 6 | 1987–88 | North. Kentucky |
| | Ronnie Ellison | 6 | 1987–88 | Virginia Tech |
| | Allen Jackson | 6 | 1991–92 | Saint Louis |
| | Terry Nelson | 6 | 1992–93 | Georgia Southern |
| | Erik Martin | 6 | 1992–93 | Xavier |
| | Charles Williams | 6 | 1996–97 | Howard |
| | Kenyon Martin | 6 | 1998–99 | Nicholls State |
| | Deonta Vaughn | 6 | 2006–07 | NC State |
| | Cashmere Wright | 6 | 2011–12 | Villanova |
| | Sean Kilpatrick | 6 | 2011–12 | Ark.-Pine Bluff |
| | Day Day Thomas | 6 | 2024–25 | Oklahoma State |

== Blocks ==
Career
| Rk | Player | Blocks | Seasons |
|---|---|---|---|
| 1 | Kenyon Martin | 292 | 1996–97 1997–98 1998–99 1999–2000 |
| 2 | Eric Hicks | 256 | 2002–03 2003–04 2004–05 2005–06 |
| 3 | Jason Maxiell | 252 | 2001–02 2002–03 2003–04 2004–05 |
| 4 | Justin Jackson | 219 | 2010–11 2011–12 2012–13 2013–14 |
| 5 | Gary Clark | 180 | 2014–15 2015–16 2016–17 2017–18 |
| 6 | Donald Little | 153 | 1998–99 1999–2000 2000–01 2001–02 |
| 7 | Rick Roberson | 146 | 1966–67 1967–68 1968–69 |

Season
| Rk | Player | Blocks | Season |
|---|---|---|---|
| 1 | Eric Hicks | 113 | 2005–06 |
| 2 | Kenyon Martin | 107 | 1999–2000 |
| 3 | Justin Jackson | 99 | 2013–14 |
| 4 | Jason Maxiell | 91 | 2004–05 |
| 5 | Cheikh Mbodj | 90 | 2012–13 |
| 6 | Kenyon Martin | 83 | 1997–98 |
| 7 | Kenyon Martin | 78 | 1998–99 |

Single game
| Rk | Player | Blocks | Season | Opponent |
|---|---|---|---|---|
| 1 | Rick Roberson | 10 | 1966–67 | Bradley |
| | Jim Ard | 10 | 1968–69 | Miami (Ohio) |
| | Kenyon Martin | 10 | 1997–98 | DePaul |
| | Kenyon Martin | 10 | 1999–2000 | Memphis |
| | Eric Hicks | 10 | 2005–06 | Marquette |
| 6 | George Wilson | 8 | 1963–64 | Dayton |
| | Kenyon Martin | 8 | 1997–98 | Louisville |
| | Eric Hicks | 8 | 2003–04 | Xavier |
| | Jason Maxiell | 8 | 2004–05 | Houston |
