= John Newman III =

American basketball player

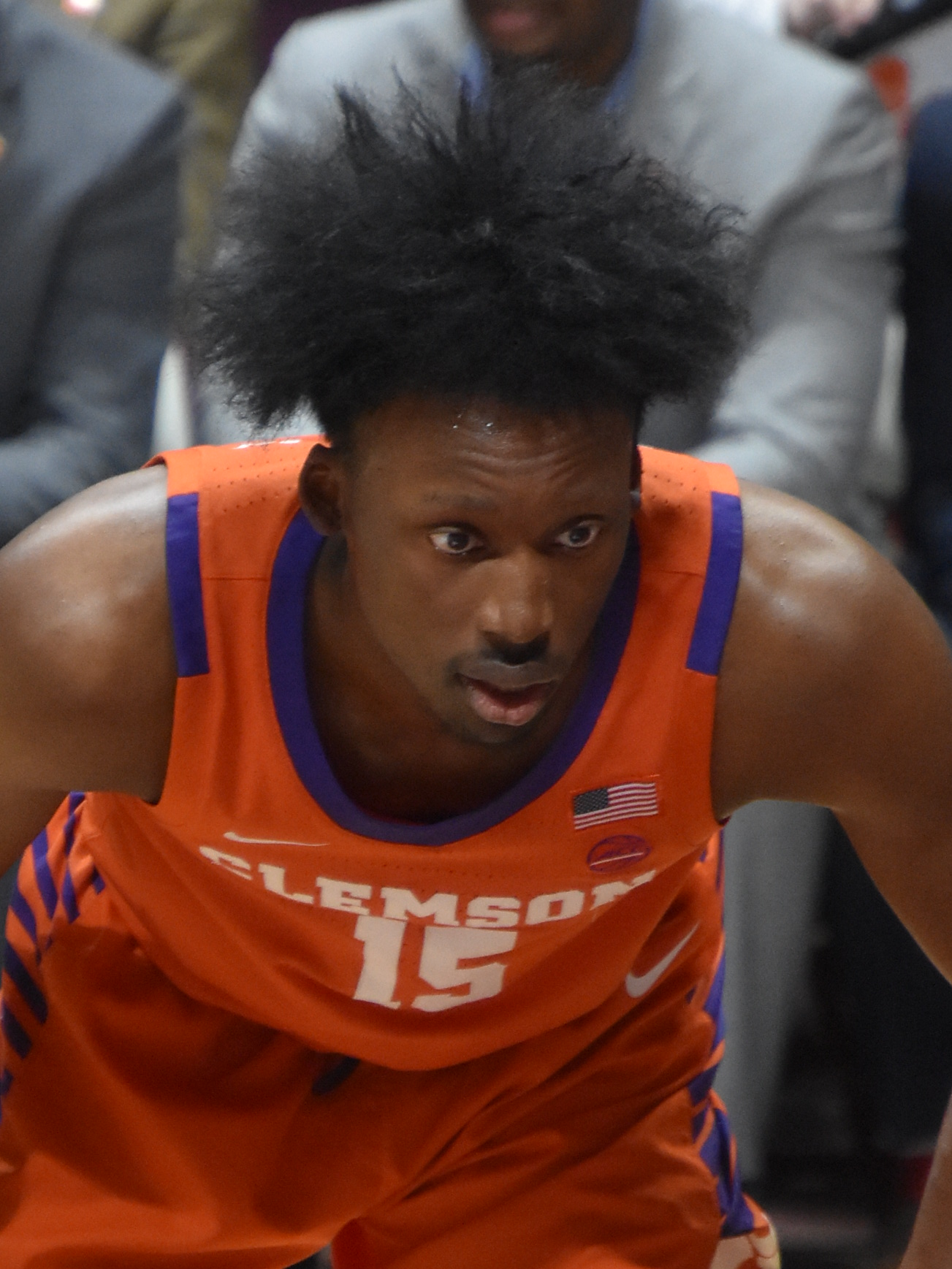
- Newman with Clemson in 2020

Free Agent
- Position: Shooting guard / small forward

Personal information
- Born: August 2, 1999 (age 27)
- Listed height: 6 ft 5 in (1.96 m)
- Listed weight: 205 lb (93 kg)

Career information
- High school: Greensboro Day School (Greensboro, North Carolina)
- College: Clemson (2018–2021); Cincinnati (2021–2024)
- NBA draft: 2024: undrafted
- Playing career: 2024–present

Career history
- 2024–2025: Kortrijk Spurs
- 2025–2026: Niners Chemnitz

Career highlights
- Big 12 All-Defensive team (2024)
Medals
Men's basketball
Representing United States
Summer Universiade
| Gold medal – first place | 2019 Italy | Team |

John Edward Newman III (born August 2, 1999) is an American professional basketball player who last played for Niners Chemnitz of the Basketball Bundesliga. He previously played for the Cincinnati Bearcats.

== Early life and high school career ==
Newman attended Greensboro Day School. He helped the team win three state titles, scoring 24 points and was named MVP of the NCISAA 3A State Championship game. As a senior, Newman averaged 14.7 points, 5.0 rebounds and 3.2 assists per game. He was named to the Associated Press North Carolina All-State Team and finished his high school career with 1,400 points, 500 rebounds, 200 assists, and 100 steals. In June 2017, he committed to Clemson. Newman also had offers from Boston College, Charlotte, Cincinnati, James Madison, Old Dominion, Providence and Wake Forest.

== College career ==
Newman averaged 2.1 points and 1.8 rebounds per game as a freshman. In Clemson's first-ever win at North Carolina on January 11, 2020, he posted 17 points, six rebounds, four assists and two steals. On February 15, Newman scored a career-high 23 points in a 77–62 win against Louisville. As a sophomore, Newman averaged 9.5 points and 3.9 rebounds per game. He received less playing time as a junior, averaging 3.7 points and two rebounds per game. This was partially due to his suffering from knee problems.

After his junior season, Newman announced he intended to transferred to UNC Greensboro. On April 20, 2021 Newman announced he was decomitting from UNC Greensboro and would be transferring to Cincinnati, following Wes Miller who had recently been named as the new head coach for the Bearcats. Newman averaged 6.9 points, 4.2 rebounds, and one steal in the 2021-22 season. He suffered a damaged meniscus early in his graduate season, forcing him to take a redshirt. In his final season Newman averaged 9.2 points and 5.4 rebounds per game.

== Professional career ==
After going undrafted in the 2024 NBA draft, on July 5, 2024, he signed with Kortrijk Spurs of the BNXT League.

On June 26, 2025, he signed with Niners Chemnitz of the Basketball Bundesliga (BBL).

== National team career ==
Newman was a part of the Clemson team chosen to represent the United States in the 2019 Summer Universiade in Italy. The U.S. received a gold medal after defeating Ukraine in the title game behind 20 points and seven rebounds from Newman. He averaged 13.3 points and 5.7 rebounds per game.

== Career statistics ==
Legend
| GP | Games played | GS | Games started | MPG | Minutes per game |
| FG% | Field goal percentage | 3P% | 3-point field goal percentage | FT% | Free throw percentage |
| RPG | Rebounds per game | APG | Assists per game | SPG | Steals per game |
| BPG | Blocks per game | PPG | Points per game | **Bold** | Career high |

=== College ===
| Year | Team | GP | GS | MPG | FG% | 3P% | FT% | RPG | APG | SPG | BPG | PPG |
|---|---|---|---|---|---|---|---|---|---|---|---|---|
| 2018–19 | Clemson | 34 | 1 | 12.0 | .384 | .321 | .545 | 1.8 | 0.4 | 0.4 | 0.1 | 2.1 |
| 2019–20 | Clemson | 31 | 31 | **31.6** | .440 | .303 | .726 | 3.9 | **2.2** | 1.0 | **0.5** | **9.5** |
| 2020–21 | Clemson | 22 | 8 | 15.6 | .341 | .250 | **.923** | 2.0 | 1.1 | 0.5 | 0.1 | 3.7 |
| 2021–22 | Cincinnati | 32 | **31** | 25.9 | .405 | .333 | .558 | 4.2 | 1.7 | 1.0 | 0.2 | 6.9 |
| 2022–23 | Cincinnati | 1 | 0 | 11.0 | – | – | – | 2.0 | 0.0 | 1.0 | 0.0 | 0.0 |
| 2023–24 | Cincinnati | **37** | **37** | 29.2 | **.485** | **.351** | .722 | **5.4** | 1.8 | **1.2** | 0.2 | 9.2 |
| Career | | 157 | 108 | 23.3 | .430 | .321 | .690 | 3.6 | 1.4 | 0.8 | 0.2 | 6.4 |

== Personal life ==
His father, John Newman II, played basketball at James Madison in the 1980s. A distant cousin, Johnny Newman, played at Richmond before embarking on a professional career.
