= List of Cincinnati Bearcats men's basketball head coaches =

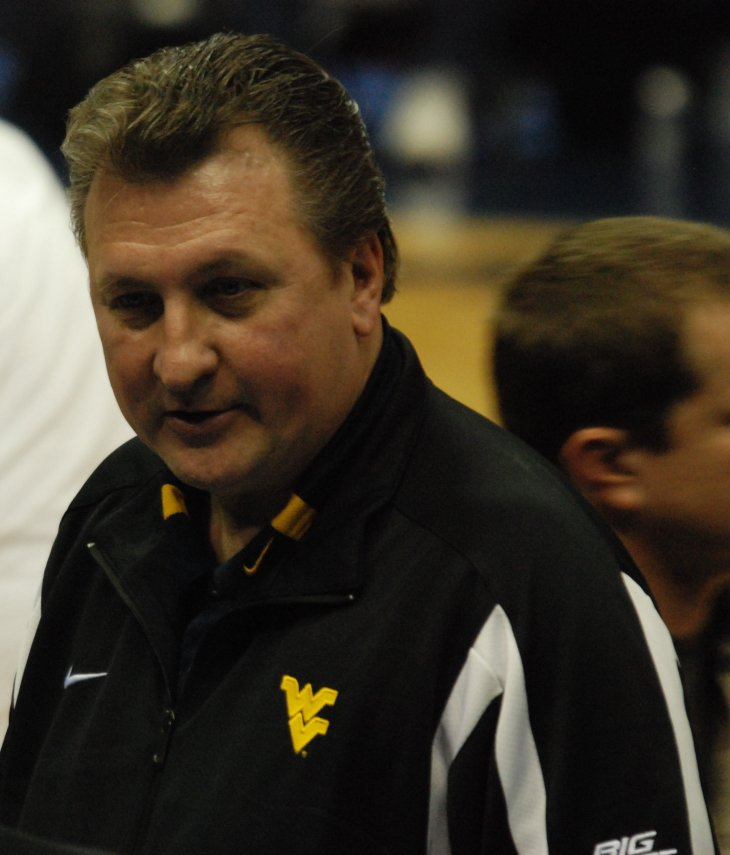
Bob Huggins, the winningest head coach in Bearcats men's basketball history.

The following is a list of Cincinnati Bearcats men's basketball head coaches. There have been 29 head coaches of the Bearcats in their 125-season history.

Cincinnati's current head coach is Jerrod Calhoun. He was hired as the Bearcats' head coach in March 2026, replacing Wes Miller, who the school announced would not return after the 2025–26 season.

No.	Tenure	Coach	Years	Record	Pct.
1	1901–1902	Henry S. Pratt	1	5–4	.556
2	1902–1904	Anthony Chez	2	12–10	.545
3	1904–1909	Amos Foster	5	30–10	.750
4	1909–1910	C. A. Shroetter	1	3–2	.600
5	1910–1914	Russ Easton	4	11–30	.268
6	1914–1916	George Little	2	4–17	.190
7	1916–1917	Ion Cortright	1	3–8	.273
8	1917–1918	Whitelaw Morrison	1	2–6	.250
9	1918–1928	Boyd Chambers	10	106–81	.567
10	1928–1932	Frank E. Rice	4	33–34	.493
11	1932–1933	John Halliday	1	9–9	.500
12	1933–1937	Tay Brown	4	47–27	.635
13	1937–1939	Rip Van Winkle	2	18–16	.529
14	1939–1942	Clark Ballard	3	24–31	.436
15	1942–1944	Bob Reuss	2	15–15	.500
16	1944–1946	Ray Farnham	2	16–22	.421
17	1946–1952	John Wiethe	6	106–47	.693
18	1952–1960	George Smith	8	154–56	.733
19	1960–1965	Ed Jucker	5	113–28	.801
20	1965–1972	Tay Baker	7	125–60	.676
21	1972–1978	Gale Catlett	6	126–44	.741
22	1978–1983	Ed Badger	5	68–71	.489
23	1983–1989	Tony Yates	6	70–100	.412
24	1989–2005	Bob Huggins	16	399–127	.759
25	2005–2006* (Note: Kennedy was named interim head coach for the 2005-06 season after Huggins left Cincinnati, and was hired as the head coach at Ole Miss while still serving as interim coach.)	Andy Kennedy	1	21–13	.618
26	2006–2019	Mick Cronin	13	296–147	.668
27	2019–2021	John Brannen	2	32–21	.604
28	2021–2026	Wes Miller	5	100–74	.575
29	2026–present	Jerrod Calhoun	1	0–0	–
Totals		29 coaches	125 seasons	1,948–1,110	.637
Records updated through end of 2025–26 season * - Denotes interim head coach. Source
