= DeAndre Williams =

American basketball player (born 1996)

No. 2 – San Diego Clippers
- Position: Power forward
- League: NBA G League

Personal information
- Born: October 4, 1996 (age 30) Houston, Texas, U.S.
- Listed height: 6 ft 9 in (2.06 m)
- Listed weight: 205 lb (93 kg)

Career information
- High school: Klein Forest (Klein, Texas); Nation Wide Academy (Oklahoma City, Oklahoma)
- College: Evansville (2019–2020); Memphis (2020–2023)
- NBA draft: 2023: undrafted
- Playing career: 2024–present

Career history
- 2024: NLEX Road Warriors
- 2024: Taiwan Beer Leopards
- 2024–2025: Sabah
- 2025–2026: Delaware Blue Coats
- 2026: Ironi Kiryat Ata
- 2026: Gigantes de Carolina
- 2026–present: San Diego Clippers

Career highlights
- T1 League champion (2024); NIT champion (2021); First-team All-AAC (2023); Second-team All-AAC (2022)
- Stats at Basketball Reference

DeAndre Williams-Baldwin (born October 4, 1996) is an American professional basketball player for the San Diego Clippers of the NBA G League. He played college basketball for the Memphis Tigers and the Evansville Purple Aces.

== High school career ==
Williams played basketball for Klein Forest High School in Klein, Texas. After his junior season, he enrolled at the Sports Association of Texas for Christian Homeschoolers, with whom he completed online courses and improved academically in hopes of qualifying for an NCAA Division I scholarship. He started training under the guidance of former NBA coach John Lucas II. He played a postgraduate season at Nation Wide Academy, a new program in Oklahoma City, Oklahoma. He averaged 24 points and 11 rebounds per game.

== College career ==
Williams was ruled ineligible by the National Collegiate Athletic Association for his 2018–19 season at Evansville. He was designated as an academic non-qualifier but was allowed to keep his athletic scholarship and practice with the team after Evansville submitted a waiver. On November 12, 2019, in his second career game, he helped his team achieve a 67–64 upset win over No. 1 Kentucky in Rupp Arena. On December 7, he recorded a career-high 37 points and 10 rebounds, shooting 17-of-18 from the field, in a 101–87 win against Miami (Ohio). Williams missed 14 of Evansville's final 17 games with a back injury. As a freshman, he averaged 15.2 points, 6.9 rebounds and 2.7 assists per game while shooting 64.8 percent from the floor. Williams was a four-time Missouri Valley Conference Newcomer of the Week honoree. After the season, he entered the transfer portal and declared for the 2020 NBA draft while maintaining his college eligibility.

For his sophomore season, Williams transferred to Memphis, choosing the Tigers over Kentucky, Arkansas and Baylor. He became eligible about three weeks into the season, after the NCAA approved a blanket waiver for Division I transfers due to the COVID-19 pandemic. Williams helped Memphis win the 2021 National Invitation Tournament, posting a season-high 21 points, nine rebounds, six assists and four steals in a 90–67 semifinal win over Colorado State. As a sophomore, he averaged 11.7 points, 5.8 rebounds, 3.4 assists and 2.2 steals per game. Williams was named to the Second Team All-AAC as a junior.

== Professional career ==
On January 9, 2024, Williams signed with the NLEX Road Warriors of the Philippine Basketball Association (PBA) to replace Stokley Chaffee Jr. as the team's import for the 2023–24 PBA Commissioner's Cup. On March 16, Williams signed with the Taiwan Beer Leopards of the T1 League.

On July 25, 2024, Williams signed with the Sabah of the Azerbaijan Basketball League on a two-year contract. On January 9, 2025, Sabah parted ways with Williams.

== Career statistics ==
Legend
GP	Games played	GS	Games started	MPG	Minutes per game
FG%	Field goal percentage	3P%	3-point field goal percentage	FT%	Free throw percentage
RPG	Rebounds per game	APG	Assists per game	SPG	Steals per game
BPG	Blocks per game	PPG	Points per game	**Bold**	Career high

=== College ===
Year	Team	GP	GS	MPG	FG%	3P%	FT%	RPG	APG	SPG	BPG	PPG
2019–20	Evansville	18	15	27.1	**.648**	**.455**	**.800**	6.9	2.7	.9	**1.0**	15.2
2020–21	Memphis	21	20	26.1	.497	**.455**	.692	5.8	**3.4**	**2.2**	.5	11.7
2021–22	Memphis	26	25	25.0	.564	.300	.693	5.8	1.7	1.3	.7	11.1
2022–23	Memphis	**35**	**35**	**31.0**	.532	.403	.732	**8.2**	2.9	1.5	.9	**17.7**
Career		100	95	27.7	.551	.405	.728	6.8	2.7	1.5	.8	14.3
