= 2022–23 Cincinnati Bearcats men's basketball team =

American college basketball season

2022–23 Cincinnati Bearcats men's basketball

NIT, Quarterfinals
- Conference: American Athletic Conference
- Record: 23–13 (11–7 AAC)
- Head coach: Wes Miller (2nd season)
- Associate head coach: Chad Dollar (2nd season)
- Assistant coaches: Andre Morgan (2nd season); Mike Roberts (2nd season)
- Home arena: Fifth Third Arena

2022–23 American Athletic Conference men's basketball standings
| | Conf. | | | | Overall |
| Team | W | | L | PCT | W | | L | PCT |
|---|---|---|---|---|---|---|---|---|
| No. 2 Houston | 17 | – | 1 | .944 | 33 | – | 4 | .892 |
| No. 24 Memphis † | 13 | – | 5 | .722 | 26 | – | 9 | .743 |
| Tulane | 12 | – | 6 | .667 | 20 | – | 11 | .645 |
| Cincinnati | 11 | – | 7 | .611 | 23 | – | 13 | .639 |
| Temple | 10 | – | 8 | .556 | 16 | – | 16 | .500 |
| Wichita State | 9 | – | 9 | .500 | 17 | – | 15 | .531 |
| UCF | 8 | – | 10 | .444 | 19 | – | 15 | .559 |
| South Florida | 7 | – | 11 | .389 | 14 | – | 18 | .438 |
| East Carolina | 6 | – | 12 | .333 | 16 | – | 17 | .485 |
| SMU | 5 | – | 13 | .278 | 10 | – | 22 | .313 |
| Tulsa | 1 | – | 17 | .056 | 5 | – | 25 | .167 |
† 2023 AAC tournament winner Rankings from AP poll

The 2022–23 Cincinnati Bearcats men's basketball team represented the University of Cincinnati in the 2022–23 NCAA Division I men's basketball season. The Bearcats were led by second-year head coach Wes Miller. The team played their home games at Fifth Third Arena as members of the American Athletic Conference. They finished the season 23–13, 11–7 in AAC play to finish in fourth place. They defeated Temple in the quarterfinals of the AAC tournament, before losing to Houston in the semifinals. They received an at-large bid to the National Invitation Tournament. There they defeated Virginia Tech and Hofstra before losing to Utah Valley in the quarterfinals.

In September 2021, Cincinnati and fellow conference members Houston and UCF accepted invitations to join the Big 12 Conference. The schools had been contractually required to remain with The American through 2024, but all reached a separation agreement that will allow them to join the Big 12 in 2023. Accordingly, the 2022–23 season was the program's last season as a member of The American.

== Previous season ==
The Bearcats finished the 2021–22 season 17–14, 7–11 in AAC play to finish seventh place. They defeated East Carolina in the AAC tournament before losing to Houston in the quarterfinals.

== Offseason ==
=== Player departures ===
Cincinnati Departing Players
| Name | Number | Pos. | Height | Weight | Year | Hometown | Notes |
|---|---|---|---|---|---|---|---|
| Abdul Ado | 00 | F | 6' 11" | 225 | Graduate Student | Lagos, Nigeria | Completed college eligibility (Note: Ado and Koval were both graduate transfers in the 2021–22 season, with Ado having graduated from Mississippi State and Koval from UNC Greensboro.) |
| A.J. McGinnis | 2 | G | 6' 3" | 180 | Sophomore | Huntsville, AL | Transferred to Lipscomb |
| Mike Saunders Jr. | 3 | G | 6' 0" | 185 | Sophomore | Indianapolis, IN | Transferred to Utah |
| Hayden Koval | 25 | C | 7' 1" | 225 | Graduate Student | Prosper, TX | Completed college eligibility |
| Sam Martin | 31 | G | 5' 10" | 180 | Graduate Student | Cincinnati, OH | Walk–on; completed college eligibility |
| Rob Banks | 43 | F | 6' 5" | 210 | Junior | Bracknell, England | Walk-on; transferred to Texas A&M-Commerce |
| Mason Madsen | 45 | G | 6' 4" | 200 | Sophomore | Rochester, MN | Transferred to Boston College |

=== Incoming transfers ===
Cincinnati incoming transfers
| Name | Number | Pos. | Height | Weight | Year | Hometown | Notes |
|---|---|---|---|---|---|---|---|
| Kalu Ezikpe | 1 | F | 6' 8" | 240 | Graduate Student | Lawrenceville, GA | Transferred from Old Dominion after graduating. Will have one year of remaining eligibility. |
| Landers Nolley II | 2 | G | 6' 7" | 208 | Graduate Student | Atlanta, GA | Transferred from Memphis after graduating. Will have two years of remaining eligibility. |
| Rob Phinisee | 10 | G | 6' 1" | 187 | Graduate Student | Lafayette, IN | Transferred from Indiana after graduating. Will have one year of remaining eligibility. |

=== Class of 2022 ===
Cincinnati signed a three-man class consisting of Sage Tolentino, Josh Reed and Daniel Skillings.

College recruiting information
| Name | Hometown | School | Height | Weight | Commit date |
|---|---|---|---|---|---|
| Sage Tolentino; C | Honolulu, HI | Hamilton High School (OH) | 7 ft 0 in (2.13 m) | 210 lb (95 kg) | Jul 15, 2021 |
| Sage Tolentino; C | Recruit ratings: Rivals: 247Sports: ESPN: (80) | | | | |
| Daniel Skillings; SG | Philadelphia, PA | Roman Catholic High School | 6 ft 5 in (1.96 m) | 180 lb (82 kg) | Sep 23, 2021 |
| Daniel Skillings; SG | Recruit ratings: Rivals: 247Sports: ESPN: (82) | | | | |
| Josh Reed; SF | Atlanta, GA | Pace Academy | 6 ft 6 in (1.98 m) | 195 lb (88 kg) | Oct 1, 2021 |
| Josh Reed; SF | Recruit ratings: Rivals: 247Sports: ESPN: (79) | | | | |
Overall recruit ranking: Rivals: 36 247Sports: 32
Note: In many cases, Scout, Rivals, 247Sports, On3, and ESPN may conflict in their listings of height and weight.; In these cases, the average was taken. ESPN grades are on a 100-point scale.; Sources: "Cincinnati 2022 Basketball Commitments". Rivals.; "2022 Cincinnati Bearcats Recruiting Class". ESPN.; "2022 Team Ranking". Rivals.

=== Class of 2023 ===
College recruiting information (2023)
| Name | Hometown | School | Height | Weight | Commit date |
|---|---|---|---|---|---|
| Rayvon Griffith; SG | Cincinnati, OH | AZ Compass Prep | 6 ft 7 in (2.01 m) | 180 lb (82 kg) | May 1, 2022 |
| Rayvon Griffith; SG | Recruit ratings: Rivals: 247Sports: ESPN: (83) | | | | |
| Jizzle James; PG | Orlando, FL | Olympia High School | 6 ft 1 in (1.85 m) | 180 lb (82 kg) | October 4, 2022 |
| Jizzle James; PG | Recruit ratings: Rivals: 247Sports: ESPN: (84) | | | | |
Overall recruit ranking:
Note: In many cases, Scout, Rivals, 247Sports, On3, and ESPN may conflict in their listings of height and weight.; In these cases, the average was taken. ESPN grades are on a 100-point scale.; Sources: "Cincinnati 2023 Basketball Commitments". Rivals.; "2023 Cincinnati Basketball Commits". ESPN.; "2023 Team Ranking". Rivals.; "Cincinnati 2023 Basketball Commits". 247Sports.

== Preseason ==
=== AAC preseason media poll ===
On October 12, The American released the preseason Poll and other preseason awards

Coaches Poll
| Predicted finish | Team | Votes (1st place) |
| 1 | Houston | 100 (10) |
| 2 | Memphis | 87 (1) |
| 3 | Cincinnati | 82 |
| 4 | Tulane | 74 |
| 5 | Temple | 66 |
| 6 | UCF | 51 |
| 7 | SMU | 43 |
| 8 | Wichita State | 35 |
| 9 | South Florida | 33 |
| 10 | Tulsa | 21 |
| 11 | East Carolina | 13 |

=== Preseason Awards ===
- AAC Preseason All-Conference Second Team - David DeJulius

== Roster ==
2022–23 Cincinnati Bearcats men's basketball team
Players
Coaches

| Pos. | # | Name | Height | Weight | Year | Previous school | Hometown |
|---|---|---|---|---|---|---|---|
| G | 0 | Daniel Skillings | 6 ft 6 in (1.98 m) | 205 lb (93 kg) | Fr | Roman Catholic High School | Philadelphia, PA |
| F | 1 | Kalu Ezikpe | 6 ft 8 in (2.03 m) | 235 lb (107 kg) | GS | Old Dominion | Lawrenceville, GA |
| G | 2 | Landers Nolley II | 6 ft 7 in (2.01 m) | 220 lb (100 kg) | RS Sr | Memphis | Atlanta, GA |
| G | 3 | Mika Adams-Woods | 6 ft 3 in (1.91 m) | 180 lb (82 kg) | Sr | New Hampton School | Syracuse, NY |
| G | 5 | David DeJulius | 6 ft 0 in (1.83 m) | 200 lb (91 kg) | GS | Michigan | Detroit, MI |
| G | 10 | Rob Phinisee (injured) | 6 ft 1 in (1.85 m) | 190 lb (86 kg) | GS | Indiana | Lafayette, IN |
| G | 11 | CJ Anthony (W) | 6 ft 0 in (1.83 m) | 195 lb (88 kg) | So | Putnam Science Academy | Columbus, OH |
| G | 13 | Josh Reed | 6 ft 7 in (2.01 m) | 220 lb (100 kg) | Fr | Pace Academy | Atlanta, GA |
| G/F | 15 | John Newman III (injured) | 6 ft 5 in (1.96 m) | 205 lb (93 kg) | GS | Clemson | Greensboro, NC |
| G | 21 | Chase Kirkwood (W) | 6 ft 1 in (1.85 m) | 195 lb (88 kg) | So | Arkansas | Phoenix, MD |
| G | 24 | Jeremiah Davenport | 6 ft 7 in (2.01 m) | 215 lb (98 kg) | Sr | Hargrave Military Academy | Cincinnati, OH |
| F | 30 | Viktor Lakhin | 6 ft 11 in (2.11 m) | 240 lb (109 kg) | RS So | CSKA–2 | Anapa, Russia |
| F | 32 | Jarrett Hensley | 6 ft 8 in (2.03 m) | 220 lb (100 kg) | So | UNC Greensboro | Merriam, KS |
| F | 33 | Ody Oguama | 6 ft 9 in (2.06 m) | 225 lb (102 kg) | Jr | Wake Forest | Raleigh, NC |
| C | 44 | Sage Tolentino (injured) (redshirt) | 7 ft 1 in (2.16 m) | 230 lb (104 kg) | Fr | Hamilton High School | Kane'ohe, HI |

Head coach

- Wes Miller (North Carolina)

Assistant coach(es)

- Andre Morgan (North Georgia)
- Mike Roberts (Indiana)
- Chad Dollar (South Florida)

Legend

- (C) Team captain
- (S) Suspended
- (I) Ineligible
- (W) Walk-on
- Injured
- Current redshirt

Roster
Last update: 6 Oct 2022

- November 15, 2022: John Newman III injured his knee, leading to him missing the rest of the season.

== Schedule and results ==
| Date time, TV | Rank^{#} | Opponent^{#} | Result | Record | High points | High rebounds | High assists | Site (attendance) city, state |
Regular Season
| November 7, 2022*; 7:00 p.m., ESPN+ | | Chaminade | W 98–55 | 1–0 | 24 – DeJulius | 6 – Tied | 8 – Phinisee | Fifth Third Arena (9,043); Cincinnati, OH |
| November 10, 2022*; 8:00 p.m., ESPN+ | | Cleveland State | W 69–58 | 2–0 | 18 – DeJulius | 12 – Lakhin | 6 – DeJulius | Fifth Third Arena (9,227); Cincinnati, OH |
| November 13, 2022*; 12:00 p.m., ESPN+ | | Eastern Kentucky | W 87–69 | 3–0 | 22 – DeJulius | 12 – Ogauma | 4 – Adams-Woods | Fifth Third Arena (9,103); Cincinnati, OH |
| November 16, 2022*; 7:00 p.m., ESPN+ | | at Northern Kentucky | L 51–64 | 3–1 | 9 – Tied | 9 – Lakhin | 4 – Phinisee | Truist Arena (8,503); Highland Heights, KY |
| November 21, 2022*; 11:30 p.m., ESPN2 | | vs. No. 14 Arizona; Maui Invitational Tournament quarterfinals | L 93–101 | 3–2 | 33 – Nolley II | 5 – Tied | 5 – DeJulius | Lahaina Civic Center (2,400); Lahaina, HI |
| November 22, 2022*; 5:00 p.m., ESPN2 | | vs. Ohio State; Maui Invitational Tournament consolation round | L 53–81 | 3–3 | 12 – Lakhin | 4 – Tied | 1 – Tied | Lahaina Civic Center (2,400); Lahaina, HI |
| November 23, 2022*; 7:30 p.m., ESPNU | | vs. Louisville; Maui Invitational Tournament 7th–place game | W 81–62 | 4–3 | 26 – DeJulius | 6 – Tied | 6 – Davenport | Lahaina Civic Center (2,400); Lahaina, HI |
| November 30, 2022*; 7:00 p.m., ESPN+ | | NJIT | W 86–60 | 5–3 | 22 – DeJulius | 10 – Lakhin | 2 – Tied | Fifth Third Arena (8,769); Cincinnati, OH |
| December 4, 2022*; 12:00 p.m., ESPN+ | | Bryant | W 97–71 | 6–3 | 16 – Lakhin | 13 – Tied | 7 – DeJulius | Fifth Third Arena (9,273); Cincinnati, OH |
| December 10, 2022*; 3:00 p.m., ESPN2 | | Xavier; Crosstown Shootout | L 77–80 | 6–4 | 22 – DeJulius | 8 – Lakhin | 6 – Adams-Woods | Fifth Third Arena (12,012); Cincinnati, OH |
| December 14, 2022*; 7:00 p.m., ESPN+ | | Miami (OH) | W 103–76 | 7–4 | 22 – DeJulius | 4 – Tied | 6 – Adams-Woods | Fifth Third Arena (8,976); Cincinnati, OH |
| December 17, 2022*; 4:00 p.m., ESPN+ | | La Salle | W 78–60 | 8–4 | 17 – Tied | 8 – Davenport | 6 – Nolley II | Fifth Third Arena (8,869); Cincinnati, OH |
| December 21, 2022*; 7:00 p.m., ESPN+ | | Detroit Mercy | W 72–54 | 9–4 | 18 – Lakhin | 15 – Lakhin | 5 – Davenport | Fifth Third Arena (9,519); Cincinnati, OH |
AAC Regular Season
| December 29, 2022; 9:00 p.m., ESPN2 | | Tulane | W 88–77 | 10–4 (1–0) | 23 – Nolley II | 13 – Lakhin | 6 – Adams-Woods | Fifth Third Arena (9,484); Cincinnati, OH |
| January 1, 2023; 3:00 p.m., ESPN | | at Temple | L 61–70 | 10–5 (1–1) | 15 – Nolley II | 5 – Oguama | 3 – Nolley II | Liacouras Center (3,224); Philadelphia, PA |
| January 5, 2023; 9:00 p.m., ESPNU | | at Wichita State | W 70–61 | 11–5 (2–1) | 22 – Davenport | 11 – Nolley II | 6 – DeJulius | Charles Koch Arena (6,876); Wichita, KS |
| January 8, 2023; 3:00 p.m., ESPN | | No. 2 Houston | L 59–72 | 11–6 (2–2) | 19 – Adams-Woods | 6 – Tied | 5 – DeJulius | Fifth Third Arena (10,264); Cincinnati, OH |
| January 11, 2023; 9:00 p.m., ESPNU | | East Carolina | W 83–55 | 12–6 (3–2) | 20 – Nolley II | 10 – Nolley II | 12 – DeJulius | Fifth Third Arena (9,118); Cincinnati, OH |
| January 14, 2023; 4:00 p.m., ESPNU | | at SMU | W 54–52 | 13–6 (4–2) | 16 – Tied | 12 – Nolley II | 5 – DeJulius | Moody Coliseum (3,817); University Park, TX |
| January 18, 2023; 7:00 p.m., ESPN+ | | at South Florida | W 85–69 | 14–6 (5–2) | 21 – Tied | 9 – Nolley II | 7 – DeJulius | Yuengling Center (3,359); Tampa, FL |
| January 22, 2023; 1:00 p.m., ESPN2 | | Memphis; Rivalry | L 68–75 | 14–7 (5–3) | 22 – Lakhin | 10 – Lakhin | 6 – DeJulius | Fifth Third Arena (8,622); Cincinnati, OH |
| January 28, 2023; 2:15 p.m., CBS | | at No. 3 Houston | L 69–75 | 14–8 (5–4) | 24 – Nolley II | 6 – Tied | 9 – DeJulius | Fertitta Center (7,477); Houston, TX |
| February 1, 2023; 7:00 p.m., ESPN+ | | Tulsa | W 81–55 | 15–8 (6–4) | 20 – Davenport | 13 – Nolley II | 9 – DeJulius | Fifth Third Arena (9,334); Cincinnati, OH |
| February 4, 2023; 12:00 p.m., ESPNU | | UCF | W 73–64 | 16–8 (7–4) | 20 – Lakhin | 8 – Lakhin | 7 – DeJulius | Fifth Third Arena (10,351); Cincinnati, OH |
| February 7, 2023; 7:00 p.m., ESPN+ | | at Tulane | L 94–101 ^{OT} | 16–9 (7–5) | 26 – Nolley II | 13 – Oguama | 8 – DeJulius | Devlin Fieldhouse (2,328); New Orleans, LA |
| February 11, 2023; 7:00 p.m., ESPN+ | | South Florida | W 84–65 | 17–9 (8–5) | 18 – Tied | 10 – Nolley II | 5 – Davenport | Fifth Third Arena (11,046); Cincinnati, OH |
| February 15, 2023; 7:00 p.m., ESPN+ | | at East Carolina | L 71–75 | 17–10 (8–6) | 19 – Tied | 9 – Oguama | 5 – DeJulius | Williams Arena (4,065); Greenville, NC |
| February 19, 2023; 12:00 p.m., ESPNU | | at UCF | W 73–71 | 18–10 (9–6) | 18 – Nolley II | 6 – Tied | 8 – DeJulius | Addition Financial Arena (5,213); Orlando, FL |
| February 22, 2023; 7:00 p.m., ESPN2 | | Temple | W 88–83 ^{OT} | 19–10 (10–6) | 20 – 2 tied | 6 – 2 tied | 7 – DeJulius | Fifth Third Arena (10,059); Cincinnati, OH |
| February 26, 2023; 2:00 p.m., ESPN2 | | at Memphis; Rivalry | L 73–76 | 19–11 (10–7) | 16 – DeJulius | 9 – Lakhin | 8 – Adams-Woods | FedExForum (12,211); Memphis, TN |
| March 5, 2023; 2:00 p.m., ESPN+ | | SMU | W 97–74 | 20–11 (11–7) | 30 – DeJulius | 6 – Lakhin | 6 – 2 tied | Fifth Third Arena (11,068); Cincinnati, OH |
AAC Tournament
| March 10, 2023; 3:00 p.m., ESPN2 | (4) | vs. (5) Temple; Quarterfinals | W 84–54 | 21–11 | 22 – Nolley II | 12 – Oguama | 5 – Adams-Woods | Dickies Arena; Fort Worth, TX |
| March 11, 2023; 3:00 p.m., ESPN2 | (4) | vs. (1) No. 1 Houston; Semifinals | L 48–69 | 21–12 | 14 – Nolley II | 9 – Oguama | 5 – DeJulius | Dickies Arena; Fort Worth, TX |
NIT
| March 15, 2023; 9:00 p.m., ESPN2 | (4) | Virginia Tech; First Round – Rutgers Bracket | W 81–72 | 22–12 | 21 – DeJulius | 12 – Nolley II | 7 – DeJulius | Fifth Third Arena (3,995); Cincinnati, OH |
| March 18, 2023; 2:00 p.m., ESPN+ | (4) | at Hofstra; Second Round – Rutgers Bracket | W 79–65 | 23–12 | 20 – Nolley II | 11 – Oguama | 9 – DeJulius | Mack Sports Complex (2,228); Hampstead, NY |
| March 22, 2023; 9:00 p.m., ESPN2 | (4) | at Utah Valley; Quarterfinals – Rutgers Bracket | L 68–74 | 23–13 | 23 – Nolley II | 10 – Lakhin | 4 – 2 tied | UCCU Center (5,289); Orem, UT |
*Non-conference game. ^{#}Rankings from AP Poll. (#) Tournament seedings in parentheses. All times are in Eastern Time.

== Awards and honors ==
=== American Athletic Conference honors ===
==== All-AAC First Team ====
- Landers Nolley II

==== All-AAC Third Team ====
- David DeJulius

==== Player of the Week ====
- Week 1: David DeJulius

==== Weekly Honor Roll ====
- Week 4: Viktor Lakhin
- Week 5: David DeJulius
- Week 6: David DeJulius
- Week 9: Viktor Lakhin
- Week 10: Landers Nolley II
- Week 11: Landers Nolley II
- Week 12: Landers Nolley II
- Week 13: David DeJulius
- Week 15: David DeJulius
- Week 17: David DeJulius

==== AAC All-Tournament Team ====
- Landers Nolley II
