= Rob Phinisee =

American basketball player (born 1999)

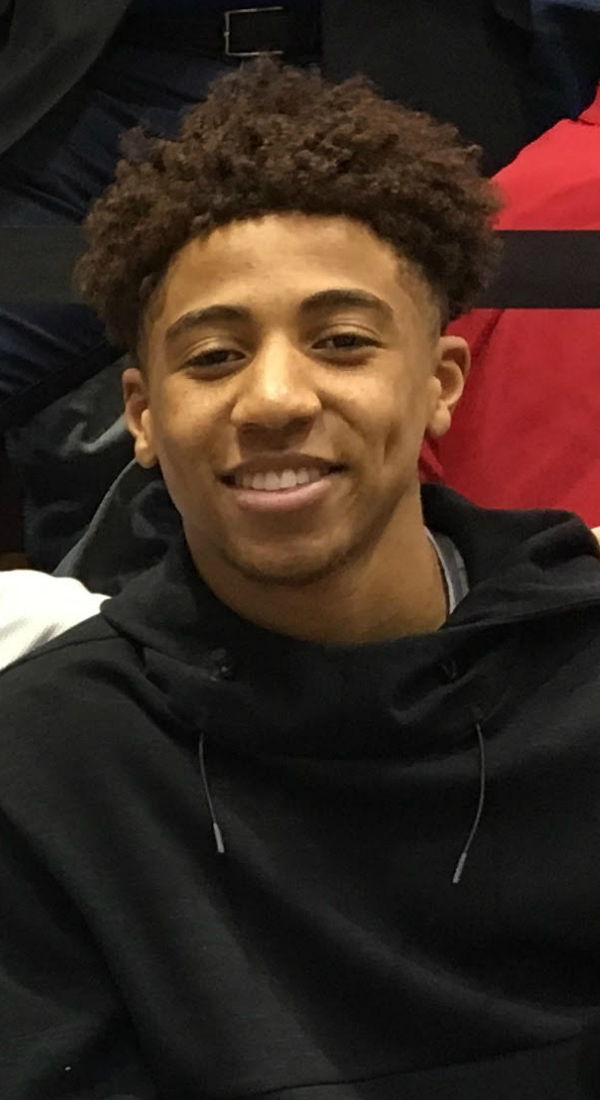

No. 10 – Cincinnati Bearcats
- Position: Point guard
- League: American Athletic Conference

Personal information
- Born: October 13, 1999 (age 26) Lafayette, Indiana, U.S.
- Listed height: 6 ft 1 in (1.85 m)
- Listed weight: 190 lb (86 kg)

Career information
- High school: McCutcheon (Lafayette, Indiana)
- College: Indiana (2018–2022); Cincinnati (2022–2023); Logansport (2025-present)

Robert Phinisee (born October 13, 1999) is an American college basketball player for Cincinnati of the American Athletic Conference. He previously played for Indiana. He attended McCutcheon High School and was ranked as one of the highest prospects in the state of Indiana.

== High school career ==
Phinisee attended McCutcheon High School. As a freshman, Phinisee averaged 6.6 points, 1.8 rebounds, and 2.5 assists. In his sophomore year, he averaged 19.0 points, 4.3 rebounds, and 6.2 assists per game helping the Mavericks to a 28–4 overall record and an undefeated 8–0 conference record. The team advanced to the Class 4A state championship game, where they lost 59–62 to New Albany. In his junior year, he averaged 21.7 points, 5.9 rebounds, and 6.8 assists per game. The season ended with a state regional loss 61–68 to Carmel, resulting in a 23–3 overall record. As part of his dominant senior journey, Phinisee was able to tie the all-time scoring record at McCutcheon (set in 2002 by Avery Sheets who went on to play at Butler University) when he hit a 3-pointer at the buzzer to end the first quarter in the game against Harrison on December 15, 2017. He went on to score a total of 50 points that game to make the record his own. On February 16, 2018, Phinisee and his teammates clinched the North Central Conference title (eventually going 9–0). Phinisee scored 34 points against Muncie Central, despite a broken nose. The season came to an early close with a loss against Zionsville's Eagles, 50–60, leaving the Mavericks with an overall record of 20–5. Phinisee scored 33 points, bringing his total to 2,023. He averaged 29.3 points, 6.8 rebounds, and 5.9 assists per game.

=== Recruiting ===
Phinisee was recruited in high school by numerous high-profile schools, including scholarship offers from in-state schools Indiana University, Purdue University, and Butler University, and out-of-state schools Georgetown University, University of Virginia, and Xavier University. On August 19, 2017, Phinisee announced his commitment to Indiana.

College recruiting
Name	Hometown	School	Height	Weight	Commit date
Rob Phinisee; PG	Lafayette, Indiana	McCutcheon (Indiana)	5 ft 11 in (1.80 m)	165 lb (75 kg)	Aug 19, 2017
Rob Phinisee; PG	Recruit ratings: Rivals: 247Sports: ESPN: (81)				
Overall recruit ranking: Rivals: 103 247Sports: 118 ESPN: —
Note: In many cases, Scout, Rivals, 247Sports, On3, and ESPN may conflict in their listings of height and weight.; In these cases, the average was taken. ESPN grades are on a 100-point scale.; Sources: "Indiana 2018 Basketball Commitments". Rivals.; "2018 Indiana Hoosiers Recruiting Class". ESPN.; "2018 Team Ranking". Rivals.

== College career ==
Phinisee suffered a concussion at the end of December 2018, missing three games. He averaged 6.9 points, 3.3 rebounds and 2.9 assists per game as a freshman. He suffered an ankle injury in December 2019. Phinisee averaged 7.3 points, 3.4 assists, and 2.5 rebounds per game as a sophomore. As a junior, Phinisee averaged 7.1 points, 2.9 assists, and 2.3 rebounds per game. On January 20, 2022, he scored a career-high 20 points including the go-ahead 3-pointer with 16.5 seconds left in a 68–65 victory over Purdue. On January 28, Phinisee was ruled out due to plantar fasciitis.

On April 20, 2022, Phinisee announced he was transferring to Cincinnati.

== Career statistics ==
Legend
GP	Games played	GS	Games started	MPG	Minutes per game
FG%	Field goal percentage	3P%	3-point field goal percentage	FT%	Free throw percentage
RPG	Rebounds per game	APG	Assists per game	SPG	Steals per game
BPG	Blocks per game	PPG	Points per game	**Bold**	Career high

=== College ===
Year	Team	GP	GS	MPG	FG%	3P%	FT%	RPG	APG	SPG	BPG	PPG
2018–19	Indiana	**32**	**29**	**27.3**	.361	.310	.660	**3.3**	2.9	**1.1**	0.1	6.8
2019–20	Indiana	27	16	23.2	**.374**	**.333**	.725	2.5	**3.4**	1.0	0.2	**7.3**
2020–21	Indiana	27	24	27.1	.347	.260	.638	2.3	2.9	0.8	**0.4**	7.1
2021–22	Indiana	25	0	18.3	.312	.264	.412	2.1	1.7	0.8	0.2	4.5
2022–23	Cincinnati	12	0	16.3	.226	.211	**1.000**	1.8	1.8	0.9	0.2	1.7
Career		123	69	23.4	.346	.286	.653	2.5	2.7	0.9	0.2	6.0

== Personal life ==
Rob is the son of Tanika Phinisee and has three brothers, Alantae, Charles, and Joe. According to his brothers, who also played at McCutcheon High School, his potential began to be recognized when he played alongside Charles in the AAU. His skills and abilities led him to a spot on Indiana Elite's AAU team.
