= Landers Nolley II =

American basketball player

- Nolley with in 2026

No. 3 – AEK Athens
- Position: Small forward / shooting guard
- League: Greek Basketball League

Personal information
- Born: March 5, 2000 (age 26) Atlanta, Georgia, U.S.
- Listed height: 6 ft 7 in (2.01 m)
- Listed weight: 208 lb (94 kg)

Career information
- High school: Curie (Chicago, Illinois); Langston Hughes (Fairburn, Georgia)
- College: Virginia Tech (2019–2020); Memphis (2020–2022); Cincinnati (2022–2023)
- NBA draft: 2023: undrafted
- Playing career: 2023–present

Career history
- 2023–2024: Birmingham Squadron
- 2024: Marinos de Oriente
- 2024–2025: Aris Thessaloniki
- 2025: Hsinchu Toplus Lioneers
- 2025: Homenetmen Beirut
- 2025–2026: SLUC Nancy
- 2026: Brampton Honey Badgers
- 2026: Al-Ittihad SC
- 2026–present: AEK Athens

Career highlights
- All-LNB Élite First Team (2026); NIT champion (2021); NIT MVP (2021); 2× First-team All-AAC (2021, 2023); ACC All-Freshman Team (2020)
- Stats at NBA.com
- Stats at Basketball Reference

Landers Sanchez Nolley II (born March 5, 2000) is an American professional basketball player for AEK Athens of the Greek Basketball League. He played college basketball for the Virginia Tech Hokies, the Memphis Tigers and the Cincinnati Bearcats.

== Early life and high school career ==
Nolley learned to play basketball from his father, also named Landers Nolley, who played college basketball for LSU. He trained with his father every day. In his sophomore season, Nolley averaged 17 points per game for Curie Metropolitan High School in Chicago and helped his team win a Class 4A state championship. As a junior, he transferred to Langston Hughes High School in Fairburn, Georgia. Nolley averaged 25 points and seven rebounds per game in his first year with his team. He scored 26 points to lead Langston Hughes to its first Georgia 6A state title.

In his senior season, Nolley averaged 31 points, eight rebounds, and three assists per game, helping his team defend the Georgia 6A championship. He posted 34 points, 10 rebounds, and six assists in the finals. Nolley was named Atlanta Journal-Constitution Player of the Year and USA Today Georgia Player of the Year. He also earned All-State honors and left as his school's all-time leading scorer. Nolley was a consensus four-star recruit and top-100 prospect in the 2018 class. On October 15, 2017, one week after committing to play college basketball for Georgia, he switched his commitment to Virginia Tech.

== College career ==
=== Virginia Tech ===
Nolley was forced to sit out his freshman season due to the NCAA reviewing his academic eligibility. While he sat on the bench, Virginia Tech finished 26–9 and reached the Sweet 16 of the NCAA Tournament. After the season, the Hokies' top five scorers and coach Buzz Williams departed, but Nolley announced he was staying at Virginia Tech and had no intention of transferring. Nolley scored 30 points including four three-pointers in his debut for the Hokies, a 67–60 win over Clemson. After scoring 27 points against Lehigh and 23 points against USC Upstate, Nolley was named Atlantic Coast Conference freshman of the week on November 18, 2019. He had 22 points in a 71–66 upset of number 3-ranked Michigan State on November 25, hitting a crucial three-pointer with under a minute to go. At the conclusion of the regular season, Nolley was selected to the ACC All-Freshman Team and was Honorable Mention All-Conference. He averaged 15.5 points and 5.8 rebounds per game. After the season, he announced he was transferring from Virginia Tech.

=== Memphis ===
On April 20, 2020, Nolley announced on Twitter that he would continue his career at Memphis, choosing the Tigers over Georgia and Ole Miss. Nolley was granted a waiver for immediate eligibility on August 27, 2020. He averaged 13.1 points, 4.1 rebounds and 1.8 assists per game as a redshirt sophomore. Nolley was named MVP of the NIT, helping the Tigers win the championship.

The following year, Nolley was fourth for the Tigers in scoring, averaging 9.8 PPG, and helped lead the team to their first NCAA appearance since 2014. After the season, Nolley entered the transfer portal.

=== Cincinnati ===
After having visits to NC State and Texas A&M, Nolley committed to Cincinnati on April 27, 2022. Nolley lead the Bearcats in scoring during the 2022-23 season, averaging 16.8 PPG and 5.8 RPG. Nolley was a key contributor to the Bearcats season, earning First-Team All-AAC honors, and would help lead the Bearcats to the Quarterfinals of the 2023 National Invitation Tournament.

== Professional career ==
=== Birmingham Squadron (2023–2024) ===
After going undrafted in the 2023 NBA draft, Nolley signed with the New Orleans Pelicans on September 30, 2023, but was waived on October 16. On October 29, he signed with the Birmingham Squadron.

=== Marinos de Oriente (2024) ===
On March 7, 2024, Nolley signed with the Marinos de Oriente of the Superliga Profesional de Baloncesto.

=== Aris Thessaloniki (2024–2025) ===
On July 9, 2024, Nolley signed with Aris of the Greek Basketball League.

=== Hsinchu Toplus Lioneers (2025) ===
On January 15, 2025, Nolley signed with the Hsinchu Toplus Lioneers of the Taiwan Professional Basketball League (TPBL). On January 19, 2025, he set both the new single-game and single-half scoring record in the Taiwan Professional Basketball League, with 26 points scored in the first half and ended with 44 points including 5 three pointers. Nolley also grabbed 9 rebounds and made 8 assists, but his team, Hsinchu Toplus Lioneers lost the game to New Taipei Kings, by a score of 114:106.

=== SLUC Nancy (2025–2026) ===
On July 14, 2025, he signed with SLUC Nancy Basket of the LNB Pro A.

=== AEK Athens (2026–present) ===
On August 6, 2026, he signed with AEK Athens of the Greek Basketball League.

== Career statistics ==
Legend
GP	Games played	GS	Games started	MPG	Minutes per game
FG%	Field goal percentage	3P%	3-point field goal percentage	FT%	Free throw percentage
RPG	Rebounds per game	APG	Assists per game	SPG	Steals per game
BPG	Blocks per game	PPG	Points per game	**Bold**	Career high

=== College ===
Year	Team	GP	GS	MPG	FG%	3P%	FT%	RPG	APG	SPG	BPG	PPG
2018–19	Virginia Tech	Redshirt										
2019–20	Virginia Tech	32	29	30.2	.370	.316	.780	5.8	2.4	0.8	0.3	15.5
2020–21	Memphis	28	25	27.4	.415	.387	**.803**	4.1	1.8	**1.1**	0.2	13.1
2021–22	Memphis	29	18	26.6	.380	.336	.795	3.9	**2.8**	0.9	0.3	9.8
2022–23	Cincinnati	**36**	**36**	**32.1**	**.447**	**.417**	.750	5.8	2.6	1.0	**0.5**	**16.8**
**Career**		125	108	29.3	.406	.368	.777	5.0	2.4	0.9	0.3	14.0
