= 2022–23 Virginia Tech Hokies men's basketball team =

American college basketball season

2022–23 Virginia Tech Hokies men's basketball

NIT, First Round
- Conference: Atlantic Coast Conference
- Record: 19–15 (8–12 ACC)
- Head coach: Mike Young (4th season)
- Associate head coach: Mike Jones
- Assistant coaches: Christian Webster; Kevin Giltner
- Home arena: Cassell Coliseum

2022–23 ACC men's basketball standings
	Conf.				Overall
Team	W		L	PCT	W		L	PCT
No. 16 Miami (FL)	15	–	5	.750	29	–	8	.784
No. 14 Virginia	15	–	5	.750	25	–	8	.758
Clemson	14	–	6	.700	23	–	11	.676
No. 12 Duke †	14	–	6	.700	27	–	9	.750
Pittsburgh	14	–	6	.700	24	–	12	.667
NC State	12	–	8	.600	23	–	11	.676
North Carolina	11	–	9	.550	20	–	13	.606
Wake Forest	10	–	10	.500	19	–	14	.576
Syracuse	10	–	10	.500	17	–	15	.531
Boston College	9	–	11	.450	16	–	17	.485
Virginia Tech	8	–	12	.400	19	–	15	.559
Florida State	7	–	13	.350	9	–	23	.281
Georgia Tech	6	–	14	.300	15	–	18	.455
Notre Dame	3	–	17	.150	11	–	21	.344
Louisville	2	–	18	.100	4	–	28	.125
† 2023 ACC tournament winner Rankings from AP poll

The 2022–23 Virginia Tech Hokies men's basketball team represented Virginia Polytechnic Institute and State University during the 2022–23 NCAA Division I men's basketball season. The Hokies were led by fourth-year head coach Mike Young and played their home games at Cassell Coliseum in Blacksburg, Virginia, as members of the Atlantic Coast Conference. They finished the season 19–15, 8–12 in ACC play to finish in 11th place. In the ACC tournament, they defeated Notre Dame before losing to NC State in the second round. They received an at-large bid to the National Invitation Tournament, where they lost to Cincinnati in the first round.

== Previous season ==
The Hokies finished the 2020–21 season 23–13, 11–9 in ACC play, to finish in seventh place. They defeated Clemson, Notre Dame, and North Carolina to advance to the ACC tournament championship. There, they defeated Duke to win the tournament championship. As a result, they received the conference's automatic bid to the NCAA Tournament as the No. 11 seed in the East region, where they lost in the first round to Texas.

== Offseason ==
=== Departures ===
Departures
Name	Number	Pos.	Height	Weight	Year	Hometown	Reason for departure
David N'Guessan	1	F	6'9"	205	Sophomore	De Lier, Netherlands	Transferred to Kansas State
Nahiem Alleyne	4	G	6'4"	195	Junior	Buford, GA	Transferred to UConn
Storm Murphy	5	G	6'0"	185	GS senior	Middleton, WI	Graduated
Jalen Haynes	11	F	6'8"	250	Freshman	Fort Lauderdale, FL	Transferred to East Tennessee State
Ben Varga	14	G	5'10"	170	Freshman	Louisville, KY	Walk-on; not on roster
John Ojiako	21	C	6'10"	245	Junior	Lagos, Nigeria	Transferred to George Mason
Keve Aluma	22	F	6'9"	235	RS senior	Berlin, MD	Graduated/went undrafted in 2022 NBA draft

=== Incoming transfers ===
Incoming transfers
Name	Number	Pos.	Height	Weight	Year	Hometown	Previous school
John Camden	11	F	6'8"	208	Sophomore	Downingtown, PA	Memphis
Grant Baslie	21	F	6'9"	225	RS senior	Pewaukee, WI	Wright State
Mylyjael Poteat	34	F	6'9"	260	Junior	Reidsville, NC	Rice

=== 2022 recruiting class ===
College recruiting
Name	Hometown	School	Height	Weight	Commit date
Rodney Rice #8 SG	Clinton, MD	DeMatha Catholic High School	6 ft 3 in (1.91 m)	185 lb (84 kg)	Oct 3, 2021
Rodney Rice #8 SG	Recruit ratings: Scout: Rivals: 247Sports: ESPN: (87)				
M. J. Collins #34 SG	Clover, SC	Westminster Catawba Christian	6 ft 3 in (1.91 m)	175 lb (79 kg)	Jul 4, 2021
M. J. Collins #34 SG	Recruit ratings: Scout: Rivals: 247Sports: ESPN: (82)				
Pat Wessler #61 C	Charlotte, NC	Combine Academy	7 ft 0 in (2.13 m)	225 lb (102 kg)	Sep 19, 2021
Pat Wessler #61 C	Recruit ratings: Scout: Rivals: 247Sports: ESPN: (79)				
Darren Buchanan #53 SF	Washington, DC	Woodrow Wilson High School	6 ft 7 in (2.01 m)	225 lb (102 kg)	Mar 5, 2022
Darren Buchanan #53 SF	Recruit ratings: Scout: Rivals: 247Sports: ESPN: (79)				
Overall recruit ranking:
Note: In many cases, Scout, Rivals, 247Sports, On3, and ESPN may conflict in their listings of height and weight.; In these cases, the average was taken. ESPN grades are on a 100-point scale.; Sources: "Virginia Tech Hokies". ESPN.; "2022 Team Ranking". Rivals.

=== 2023 recruiting class ===
College recruiting (2023)
Name	Hometown	School	Height	Weight	Commit date
Jaydon Young #57 SG	Clover, SC	Westminster Catawba Christian	6 ft 3 in (1.91 m)	180 lb (82 kg)	Jul 29, 2022
Jaydon Young #57 SG	Recruit ratings: Scout: Rivals: 247Sports: ESPN: (79)				
Brandon Rechsteiner; PG	Woodstock, GA	Etowah High School	6 ft 1 in (1.85 m)	185 lb (84 kg)	Jul 15, 2022
Brandon Rechsteiner; PG	Recruit ratings: Scout: Rivals: 247Sports: ESPN: (NR)				
Overall recruit ranking:
Note: In many cases, Scout, Rivals, 247Sports, On3, and ESPN may conflict in their listings of height and weight.; In these cases, the average was taken. ESPN grades are on a 100-point scale.; Sources: "Virginia Tech Hokies". ESPN.; "2021 Team Ranking". Rivals.

== Roster ==
2022–23 Virginia Tech Hokies men's basketball team
Players
Coaches

Pos.	#	Name	Height	Weight	Year	Previous school	Hometown
G	0	Hunter Cattoor	6 ft 3 in (1.91 m)	200 lb (91 kg)	Sr	Bishop Moore	Orlando, FL
G	1	Rodney Rice	6 ft 4 in (1.93 m)	195 lb (88 kg)	Fr	DeMatha Catholic	Clinton, SC
G	2	Michael Collins Jr.	6 ft 4 in (1.93 m)	190 lb (86 kg)	Fr	Combine Academy	Clover, SC
G	3	Sean Pedulla	6 ft 1 in (1.85 m)	195 lb (88 kg)	So	Edmond Memorial	Edmond, OK
F	4	Darren Buchanan Jr.	6 ft 7 in (2.01 m)	235 lb (107 kg)	Fr	Woodrow Wilson	Washington, D.C.
C	5	Patrick Wessler	7 ft 0 in (2.13 m)	245 lb (111 kg)	Fr	Combine Academy	Matthews, NC
G	10	Camden Johnson (W)	6 ft 1 in (1.85 m)	185 lb (84 kg)	So	Metrolina Christian Academy	Waxhaw, NC
F	11	John Camden	6 ft 8 in (2.03 m)	215 lb (98 kg)	So	Memphis	Downingtown, PA
G	13	Dairus Maddox	6 ft 5 in (1.96 m)	180 lb (82 kg)	Jr	Oak Hill Academy	Bowie, MD
G	14	Owyn Dawyot (W)	6 ft 2 in (1.88 m)	190 lb (86 kg)	Fr	Cave Spring	Roanoke, VA
C	15	Lynn Kidd	6 ft 10 in (2.08 m)	235 lb (107 kg)	Jr	Clemson	Gainesvlle, FL
F	21	Grant Basile	6 ft 9 in (2.06 m)	225 lb (102 kg)	RS Sr	Wright State	Pewaukee, WI
F	25	Justyn Mutts	6 ft 7 in (2.01 m)	220 lb (100 kg)	GS	Delaware	Millville, NJ
G	33	Michael Ward (W)	6 ft 2 in (1.88 m)	175 lb (79 kg)	Fr	Walt Whitman	Bethesda, MD
F	34	Mylyjael Poteat	6 ft 9 in (2.06 m)	265 lb (120 kg)	Jr	Rice	Reidsville, NC

Head coach

- Mike Young (Emory & Henry)

Assistant coach(es)

- Mike Jones (Old Dominion)
- Christian Webster (Harvard)
- Kevin Giltner (Wofford)

Legend

- (C) Team captain
- (S) Suspended
- (I) Ineligible
- (W) Walk-on
- Injured
- Current redshirt

Roster

== Schedule and results ==
Date time, TV	Rank^{#}	Opponent^{#}	Result	Record	High points	High rebounds	High assists	Site (attendance) city, state
Regular season
November 7, 2022*; 7:00 p.m., ACCNX/ESPN+		Delaware State	W 95–57	1–0	30 – Basile	10 – Tied	8 – Pedulla	Cassell Coliseum (7,899); Blacksburg, VA
November 10, 2022*; 6:00 p.m., ACCN		Lehigh	W 78–52	2–0	20 – Pedulla	11 – Mutts	5 – Mutts	Cassell Coliseum (7,541); Blacksburg, VA
November 13, 2022*; 6:00 p.m., ACCRSN		William & Mary	W 94–77	3–0	22 – Tied	4 – 4 tied	6 – Mutts	Cassell Coliseum (7,936); Blacksburg, VA
November 17, 2022*; 2:00 p.m., ESPN2		vs. Old Dominion; Charleston Classic Quarterfinals	W 75–71	4–0	18 – Pedulla	10 – Mutts	7 – Pedulla	TD Arena (2,155); Charleston, SC
November 18, 2022*; 12:00 p.m., ESPN2		vs. Penn State; Charleston Classic Semifinals	W 61–59	5–0	17 – Basile	12 – Mutts	5 – Mutts	TD Arena; Charleston, SC
November 20, 2022*; 3:30 p.m., ESPN2		at College of Charleston; Charleston Classic Championship	L 75–77	5–1	17 – Catoor	9 – Mutts	4 – Basile	TD Arena; Charleston, SC
November 25, 2022*; 8:00 p.m., ACCN		Charleston Southern	W 69–64	6–1	17 – Mutts	9 – Mutts	5 – Mutts	Cassell Coliseum (8,925); Blacksburg, VA
November 28, 2022*; 7:00 p.m., ESPN2		Minnesota; ACC–Big Ten Challenge	W 67–57	7–1	17 – Pedulla	9 – Mutts	3 – Basile	Cassell Coliseum (7,870); Blacksburg, VA
December 4, 2022; 3:00 p.m., ACCN		No. 18 North Carolina	W 80–72	8–1 (1–0)	27 – Mutts	11 – Mutts	4 – Tied	Cassell Coliseum (8,925); Blacksburg, VA
December 7, 2022*; 8:00 p.m., ACCN		Dayton	W 77–49	9–1	23 – Basile	10 – Basile	3 – Tied	Cassell Coliseum (7,702); Blacksburg, VA
December 11, 2022*; 2:00 p.m., ESPN2		vs. Oklahoma State; Basketball Hall of Fame Invitational	W 70–65	10–1	16 – Pedulla	6 – Tied	4 – Tied	Barclays Center; Brooklyn, NY
December 17, 2022*; 4:00 p.m., ACCRSN	No. 24	Grambling State	W 74–48	11–1	21 – Pedulla	5 – Tied	6 – Pedulla	Cassell Coliseum (7,587); Blacksburg, VA
December 21, 2022; 6:30 p.m., ACCN	No. 21	at Boston College	L 65–70 ^{OT}	11–2 (1–1)	18 – Tied	8 – Tied	5 – Pedulla	Conte Forum (4,012); Chestnut Hill, MA
December 31, 2022; 12:00 p.m., ACCRSN		at Wake Forest	L 75–77	11–3 (1–2)	18 – Tied	11 – Mutts	7 – Pedulla	LJVM Coliseum (8,709); Winston-Salem, NC
January 4, 2023; 9:00 p.m., ESPNU		Clemson	L 65–68	11–4 (1–3)	17 – Basile	9 – Tied	4 – Tied	Cassell Coliseum (7,539); Blacksburg, VA
January 7, 2023; 7:30 p.m., ACCRSN		NC State	L 69–73	11–5 (1–4)	19 – Pedulla	8 – Mutts	4 – Pedulla	Cassell Coliseum (8,925); Blacksburg, VA
January 11, 2023; 7:30 p.m., ACCRSN		at Syracuse	L 72–82	11–6 (1–5)	26 – Basile	10 – Basile	9 – Mutts	JMA Wireless Dome (16,158); Syracuse, NY
January 18, 2023; 7:00 p.m., ESPNU		at No. 10 Virginia; Rivalry	L 68–78	11–7 (1–6)	13 – Maddox	6 – Tied	7 – Mutts	John Paul Jones Arena (14,629); Charlottesville, VA
January 21, 2023; 6:00 p.m., ESPN2		at No. 19 Clemson	L 50–51	11–8 (1–7)	13 – Basile	8 – Basile	7 – Mutts	Littlejohn Coliseum (9,000); Clemson, SC
January 23, 2023; 7:00 p.m., ESPN		Duke	W 78–75	12–8 (2–7)	24 – Basile	8 – Basile	6 – Mutts	Cassell Coliseum (8,925); Blacksburg, VA
January 28, 2023; 7:00 p.m., ACCN		Syracuse	W 85–70	13–8 (3–7)	25 – Basile	12 – Mutts	8 – Tied	Cassell Coliseum (8,925); Blacksburg, VA
January 31, 2023; 7:00 p.m., ESPNU		at No. 23 Miami (FL)	L 83–92	13–9 (3–8)	20 – Tied	7 – Basile	4 – Cattoor	Watsco Center (5,834); Coral Gables, FL
February 4, 2023; 12:00 p.m., ESPN2		No. 6 Virginia; Rivalry	W 74–68	14–9 (4–8)	22 – Pedulla	5 – Tied	8 – Mutts	Cassell Coliseum (8,925); Blacksburg, VA
February 8, 2023; 7:00 p.m., ACCN		Boston College	L 76–82	14–10 (4–9)	33 – Basile	6 – Tied	4 – Tied	Cassell Coliseum (8,925); Blacksburg, VA
February 11, 2023; 2:00 p.m., ACCRSN		at Notre Dame	W 93–87	15–10 (5–9)	33 – Basile	8 – Mutts	9 – Mutts	Joyce Center (6,632); South Bend, IN
February 15, 2023; 7:00 p.m., ACCN		at Georgia Tech	L 70–77	15–11 (5–10)	21 – Basile	11 – Mutts	9 – Mutts	McCamish Pavilion (4,565); Atlanta, GA
February 18, 2023; 5:00 p.m., ACCN		Pittsburgh	W 79–72	16–11 (6–10)	22 – Basile	6 – Tied	5 – Pedulla	Cassell Coliseum (8,925); Blacksburg, VA
February 21, 2023; 7:00 p.m., ESPNU		No. 13 Miami (FL)	L 70–76	16–12 (6–11)	17 – Pedulla	7 – Mutts	5 – Mutts	Cassell Coliseum (8,925); Blacksburg, VA
February 25, 2023; 6:00 p.m., ESPN		at Duke	L 65–81	16–13 (6–12)	15 – Basile	5 – Tied	3 – Basile	Cameron Indoor Stadium (9,314); Durham, NC
February 28, 2023; 9:00 p.m., ACCN		at Louisville	W 71–54	17–13 (7–12)	18 – Basile	12 – Mutts	5 – Pedulla	KFC Yum! Center (11,879); Louisville, KY
March 4, 2023; 4:00 p.m., ESPN2		Florida State	W 82–60	18–13 (8–12)	25 – Pedulla	8 – Basile	6 – Mutts	Cassell Coliseum (8,925); Blacksburg, VA
ACC tournament
March 7, 2023; 7:00 p.m., ACCN	(11)	vs. (14) Notre Dame; First round	W 67–64	19–13	20 – Basile	13 – Mutts	4 – Mutts	Greensboro Coliseum (7,231); Greensboro, NC
March 8, 2023; 9:30 p.m., ESPN2	(11)	vs. (6) NC State; Second round	L 77–97	19–14	17 – Rice	5 – Mutts	4 – Pedulla	Greensboro Coliseum (17,685); Greensboro, NC
NIT
March 15, 2023; 9:00 p.m., ESPN2		at (4) Cincinnati; First round	L 72–81	19–15	19 – Mutts	7 – Basile	5 – Pedulla	Fifth Third Arena (3,995); Cincinnati, OH
*Non-conference game. ^{#}Rankings from AP Poll. (#) Tournament seedings in parentheses. All times are in Eastern Time.

== Rankings ==
Ranking movements Legend: ██ Increase in ranking ██ Decrease in ranking — = Not ranked RV = Received votes т = Tied with team above or below
	Week																			
Poll	Pre	1	2	3	4	5	6	7	8	9	10	11	12	13	14	15	16	17	18	Final
AP	RV	RV	RV	RV	RV	24	21	RV	RV	—	—	—	—	—	—	—	—	—	—	Not released
Coaches	RV	RV	RV	—	RV	23т	20	RV	RV	—	—	—	—	—	—	—	—	RV	RV	—

*AP does not release post-NCAA tournament rankings
