= Wes Miller =

American basketball player and coach

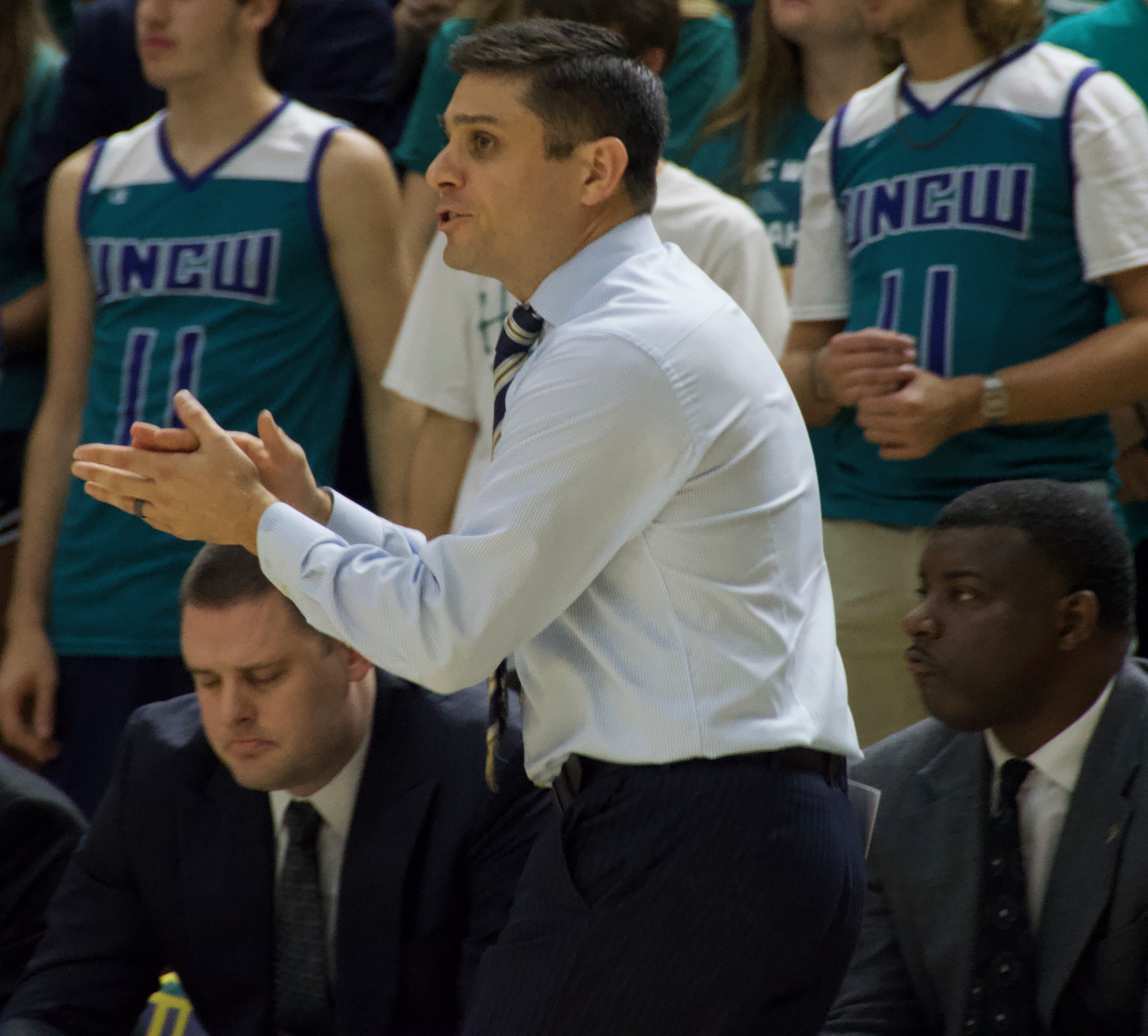
- Miller with UNC Greensboro in 2018

Current position
- Title: Head coach
- Team: Charlotte
- Conference: American
- Record: 0-0

Biographical details
- Born: January 28, 1983 (age 43); Greensboro, North Carolina, U.S.

Playing career
- 2002–2003: James Madison
- 2004–2007: North Carolina
- 2007–2008: London Capital
- Position: Point guard

Coaching career (HC unless noted)
- 2008–2009: Elon (assistant)
- 2009–2010: High Point (assistant)
- 2010–2011: UNC Greensboro (assistant)
- 2011–2021: UNC Greensboro
- 2021–2026: Cincinnati
- 2026–present: Charlotte

Head coaching record
- Overall: 285–209 (.577)
- Tournaments: 0–2 (NCAA Division I); 5–4 (NIT); 1–1 (CBI)

Accomplishments and honors

Championships
- As player: NCAA champion (2005); As coach: 2 SoCon tournament (2018, 2021); 3 SoCon regular season (2017, 2018, 2021); SoCon North Division (2012)

Awards
- 2× SoCon Coach of the Year (2012, 2018)

Warren Weston Miller (born January 28, 1983) is an American basketball coach and former player, currently the head coach of Charlotte 49ers men's basketball team. Born in Greensboro, North Carolina, he played at the collegiate level for James Madison University and the University of North Carolina–Chapel Hill, where he graduated in 2007. Professionally, Miller played for London Capital of the British Basketball League. He was previously head coach at Cincinnati, UNC Greensboro, and served stints as an assistant coach at Elon University and High Point University.

== Playing career ==
A native of Greensboro, North Carolina, Miller attended New Hampton Prep in New Hampton, New Hampshire. Miller played one year at James Madison before transferring to North Carolina to play for Roy Williams, where he successfully walked on to the basketball team. He was redshirted for the 2003–2004 season. Miller played on the Tar Heel team that won the 2005 National Championship. He graduated in 2007 with a bachelor's degree in political science, and after graduation he wrote a book titled The Road to Blue Heaven about his road to the University of North Carolina and his years playing there. After graduation, Miller played one season for London Capital of the British Basketball League.

== Coaching career ==
=== Early career ===
After playing professionally in England for a year, Miller was hired as an assistant coach at Elon University to join the staff of head coach Ernie Nestor. Elon had a record of 12–19 in the 2008–2009 season and Nestor stepped down as head coach at the end of the year. Miller was hired at High Point University and joined the staff of their new head coach, Scott Cherry, the next season.

=== UNC Greensboro ===
For the 2010–11 basketball season, Miller became an assistant coach at the University of North Carolina at Greensboro under Mike Dement. That team finished the season 7–24, in fifth place in the Southern Conference.

The next year Dement retired mid-season and Miller became interim head coach. At the time, the Spartans had a record of 2–8 and were in the midst of an eleven-game losing streak. Under Miller, the team finished Southern Conference play with a 10–8 record, 13–19 overall, winning first place in the Southern Conference North Division. Miller was named the 2012 Southern Conference Coach of the Year and was hired officially as head coach.

Miller spent the following ten seasons as the UNCG men's basketball coach. During his tenure UNCG saw an unprecedented run of success, reaching 25 wins for three successive seasons between 2016 and 2019, winning three Southern Conference championships, reaching the NCAA tournament in 2018 and 2021, and recording the program's first postseason victory in 2019. Miller is the winningest coach in UNC Greensboro history, with 185 victories.

=== Cincinnati ===
On April 14, 2021 Cincinnati hired Miller to become their next head coach, replacing John Brannen. He finished his first season leading the Bearcats to a 18–15 record, while going 7–11 in conference play. They placed 8th in the American Athletic Conference.

On March 19, 2026, it was announced that he and Cincinnati had agreed to a separation. Miller's Bearcats went 100–74 in his five seasons coaching the team, with no appearances in the NCAA tournament.

=== UNC Charlotte ===
On March 23, 2026, Miller was named the head coach of UNC Charlotte.

== Personal life ==
Miller's father, Kenneth D. Miller, is a prominent alumnus and trustee of Wake Forest University. Wes's younger brother Walker Miller also played basketball for North Carolina before transferring to Monmouth for his final year of eligibility. Wes was married to the former Ashley Love of Wilmington in 2011.

== College statistics ==
Legend
GP	Games played	GS	Games started	MPG	Minutes per game
FG%	Field goal percentage	3P%	3-point field goal percentage	FT%	Free throw percentage
RPG	Rebounds per game	APG	Assists per game	SPG	Steals per game
BPG	Blocks per game	PPG	Points per game	**Bold**	Career high

Year	Team	GP	GS	MPG	FG%	3P%	FT%	RPG	APG	SPG	BPG	PPG
2002–03	James Madison	30	0	17.2	.350	.320	.600	1.0	1.3	0.5	0.0	4.1
2003–04	North Carolina	Redshirt										
2004–05	North Carolina	24	0	3.8	.300	.313	.692	0.2	0.5	0.0	0.0	1.1
2005–06	North Carolina	31	16	**22.9**	**.438**	**.441**	.720	**1.4**	**1.9**	**1.1**	0.0	**7.2**
2006–07	North Carolina	38	1	10.6	.322	.333	**.733**	0.5	1.1	0.3	0.0	2.5
Career		123	17	14.0	.377	.373	.698	0.8	1.3	0.5	0.0	3.8

== Head coaching record ==
Record table
Season	Team	Overall	Conference	Standing	Postseason
**UNC Greensboro Spartans** (Southern Conference) (2011–2021)
2011–12	UNC Greensboro	11–11	10–5	1st (North)	
2012–13	UNC Greensboro	9–22	6–12	6th (North)	
2013–14	UNC Greensboro	14–18	7–9	6th	
2014–15	UNC Greensboro	11–22	6–12	T–7th	
2015–16	UNC Greensboro	15–19	10–8	T–5th	CBI Quarterfinals
2016–17	UNC Greensboro	25–10	14–4	T–1st	NIT first round
2017–18	UNC Greensboro	27–8	15–3	1st	NCAA Division I Round of 64
2018–19	UNC Greensboro	29–7	15–3	2nd	NIT second round
2019–20	UNC Greensboro	23–9	13–5	3rd	
2020–21	UNC Greensboro	21–9	13–5	1st	NCAA Division I Round of 64
UNC Greensboro:		185–135 (.578)	109–66 (.623)		
**Cincinnati Bearcats** (American Athletic Conference) (2021–2023)
2021–22	Cincinnati	18–15	7–11	8th	
2022–23	Cincinnati	23–13	11–7	4th	NIT Quarterfinals
**Cincinnati Bearcats** (Big 12 Conference) (2023–2026)
2023–24	Cincinnati	22–15	7–11	T–11th	NIT Quarterfinals
2024–25	Cincinnati	19–16	7–13	T–12th	CBC Quarterfinals
2025–26	Cincinnati	18–15	9–9	T–7th	
Cincinnati:		100–74 (.575)	41–51 (.446)		
**Charlotte 49ers** (American) (2026–present)
2026–27	Charlotte	0–0	0–0		
Charlotte:		0–0 (–)	0–0 (–)		
Total:		285–209 (.577)			
National champion Postseason invitational champion Conference regular season champion Conference regular season and conference tournament champion Division regular season champion Division regular season and conference tournament champion Conference tournament champion
